= List of tallest buildings in Milwaukee =

Skyline of Milwaukee
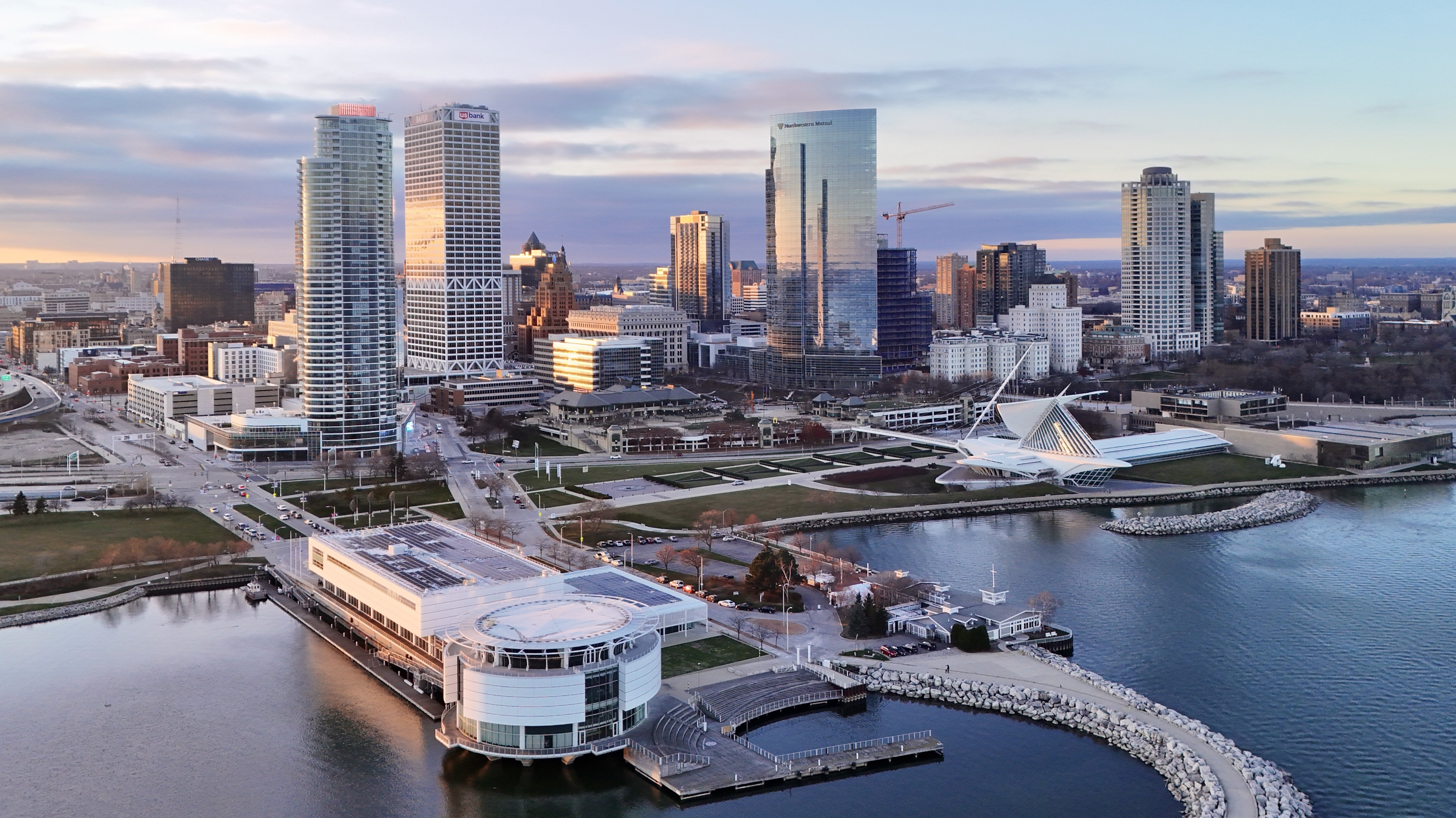
- Downtown Milwaukee in 2024
- Tallest building: U.S. Bank Center (1973)
- Tallest building height: 601 ft (183.2 m)
- First 150 m+ building: U.S. Bank Center

Number of tall buildings (2026)
- Taller than 75 m (246 ft): 38
- Taller than 100 m (328 ft): 14
- Taller than 150 m (492 ft): 4

Number of tall buildings — feet
- Taller than 200 ft (61.0 m): 53
- Taller than 300 ft (91.4 m): 15

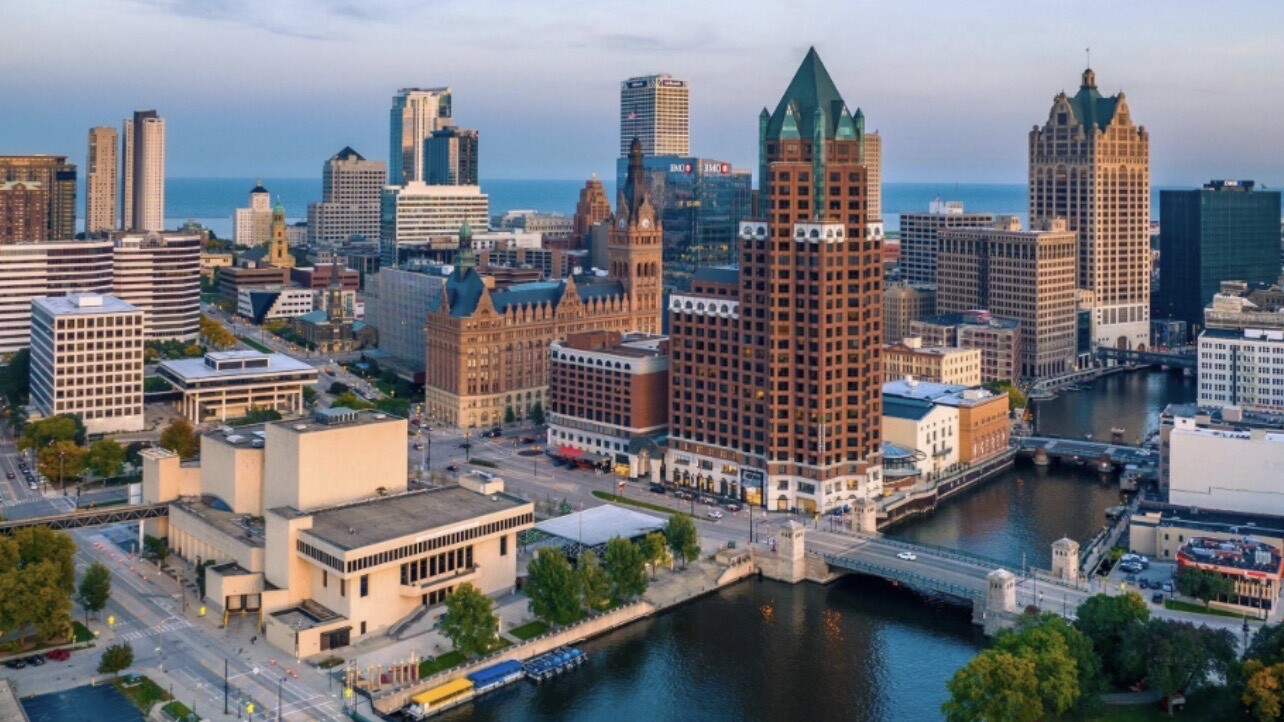
Aerial view of downtown above the Milwaukee River in 2025

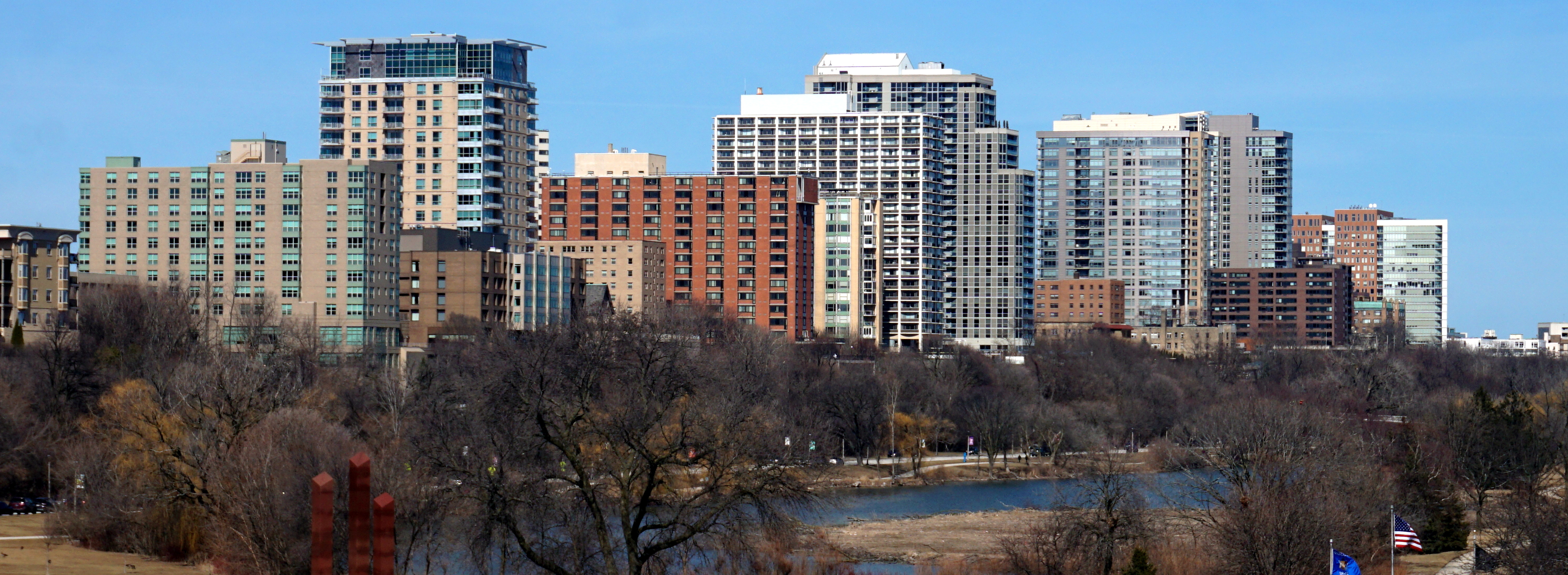
Residential buildings on North Prospect Avenue

Milwaukee is the largest city in the U.S. state of Wisconsin, with a metropolitan area of over 1.5 million residents. It is home to over 120 high-rise buildings, 53 of which stand 200 feet (61 m) or taller as of 2026. Milwaukee has the largest skyline in Wisconsin and the second largest on the shores of Lake Michigan, after Chicago. Four of the city's buildings are skyscrapers greater than 492 feet (150 m). The tallest building in Milwaukee and Wisconsin is the 42-story, 601 ft (183 m) tall U.S. Bank Center, which was completed in 1973.

The history of skyscrapers in Milwaukee began with the completion of the Pabst Building in 1891. Standing 235 ft (72 m) tall, it was Milwaukee's first high-rise, and the tallest building in the city until the Milwaukee City Hall was completed four years later. At the time of its completion, the city hall was the tallest habitable building in the United States; it dominated Milwaukee's skyline for nearly eighty years, despite a construction boom during the Roaring Twenties. Following this, there was little high-rise construction until the 1960s, when a boom took place until the early 1970s which saw the U.S. Bank Center dethrone the city hall as Milwaukee's tallest building. Another boom occurred in the late 1980s, which brought about the 548 ft (167 m) 100 East Wisconsin, currently the city's third tallest. By the end of the boom in 1992, six of the eight tallest buildings in Milwaukee had been built after 1985.

Following a lull in the 1990s, skyscraper development has continued into the 21st century. Of the 15 buildings taller than 300 ft (91 m) in Milwaukee, eight were built after 2000. Significant additions include residential buildings such as the Moderne, the tallest building in the city west of the Milwaukee River, in 2005, and University Club Tower in 2007. Northwestern Mutual, a local financial services company, demolished their 16-story headquarters to make way for Northwestern Mutual Tower and Commons. Built in 2017 at 554 ft (169 m), it is the city's second tallest building. The Couture became the tallest residential tower in Wisconsin upon completion in 2024. Milwaukee's skyline has recently become notable for mass timber high-rises. Ascent MKE, the world's tallest timber building, opened in 2022; work on The Edison, an even taller 32-story mass-timber structure, started in 2025.

The majority of Milwaukee's tallest buildings are located downtown, north of Interstate 794, south of East Juneau Avenue, east of Interstate 43, and west of Lake Michigan. The Milwaukee River runs through the skyline, separating it into a more built-up eastern half and a less dense western half. The downtown skyline has begun to expand south of Interstate 794, with the completion of 333 North Water in 2024. Extending the skyline northeast of downtown is a line of residential high-rises running along North Prospect Avenue, facing Lake Park and Veterans Park to their southeast. This grouping of towers in the Lower East Side and Northpoint neighborhoods of Milwaukee's East Side has seen recent growth with the St. Johns on the Lake and Park Lafayette twin complexes.

== History ==
Number of high-rise buildings by height in Milwaukee by the end of each year, based on the list below. This takes into account three demolished buildings. Click on the legend to toggle a specific height on or off. View chart definition.

In 2023, Northwestern Mutual announced it would undertake renovation on its 18-story North Tower to match the appearance of its recently built Northwestern Mutual Tower and Commons. The $500 million renovation is expected to be completed in 2027.

In 2025, The Edison broke ground, and is expected to become the world's tallest mass-timber building. It will be located south of Interstate 794, joining the recently completed 333 North Water in marking a southward expansion of the skyline. Work on The Edison was halted later that year, with the developer citing increased costs due to tariffs imposed during the second Trump administration.

== Cityscape ==
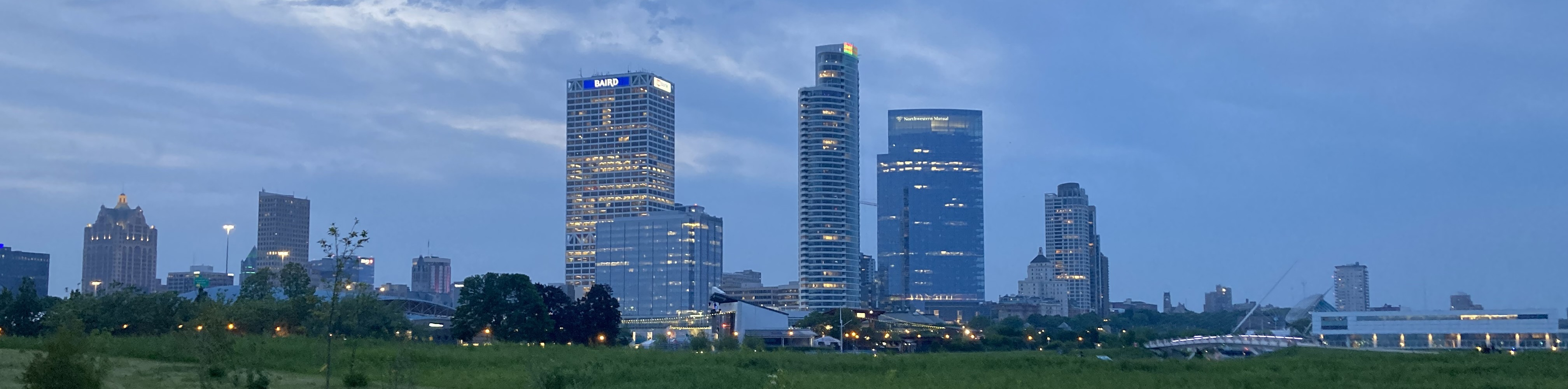
Skyline of Milwaukee from Lakeshore State Park in 2025 (Click or hover over image to identify buildings)

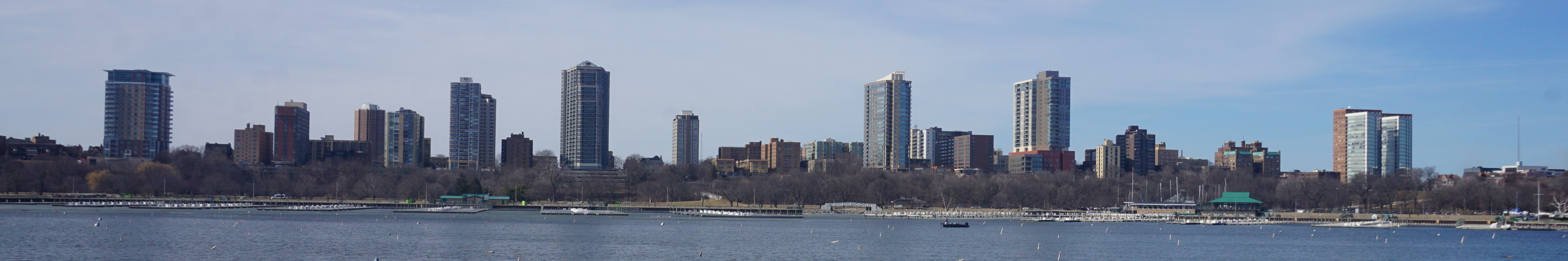
Skyline of Milwaukee's "Gold Coast" in the Northpoint neighborhood in East Side. The skyline hugs Lake Michigan northeast of downtown.

== Map of tallest buildings ==
The maps below show the location of buildings taller than 200 ft (61 m) in Downtown Milwaukee, where the majority of such buildings are. Each marker is numbered by the building's height rank, and colored by the decade of its completion.

Buildings taller than 200 ft (61 m) in Milwaukee. An asterisk (*) next to the building's name indicates it is located outside the map.
- 1950s and before
- 1960s
- 1970s
- 1980s
- 1990s
- 2000s
- 2010s
- 2020s
1 U.S. Bank Center
2 Northwestern Mutual Tower and Commons
3 100 East Wisconsin
4 The Couture
5 University Club Tower
6 Associated Bank River Center
7 411 East Wisconsin Center
8 7Seventy7
9 Kilbourn Tower
10 Milwaukee City Hall
11 Northwestern Mutual North Tower
12 The Moderne
13 333 North Water
14 BMO Tower
15 AT&T Building
16 1000 North Water Street
17 Chase Tower
18 Ascent MKE
19 Allen-Bradley Clock Tower*
20 Wisconsin Tower
21 BMO Harris Bank Building
22 Bay View Terrace*
23 St. Johns on the Lake - North Tower*
24 Hilton Milwaukee City Center
25 Regency House
26 Juneau Village
27 The Potawatomi Casino Hotel*
28 Yankee Hill Apartments 1
29 The BreakWater
30 833 East Michigan
31 633 Building
32 Basilica of St. Josaphat*
33 Wisconsin Gas Building
34 The Pfister Hotel
35 Arlington Court Apartments*
36 Locust Court Apartments*
37 St. Johns on the Lake - South Tower*
38 Landmark on the Lake*
39 Cathedral Place
40 Sandburg Hall North*
41 Riverview Apartments*
42 Yankee Hill Apartments 2
43 Diamond Tower*
44 Straz Tower
45 Two-Fifty
46 Hyatt Regency Milwaukee
47 Cudahy Tower
48 Prospect Tower*
49 CityCenter at 735
50 Park Lafayette North Tower*
51 Park Lafayette South Tower*
52 Wells Building
53 Catholic Financial Life Building

== Tallest buildings ==
This list ranks completed skyscrapers and high-rises in Milwaukee that stand at least 200 ft (61 m) tall as of 2026 based on standard height measurement. This includes spires and architectural details but does not include antenna masts. The “Year” column indicates the year of completion. Buildings tied in height are sorted by year of completion, and then alphabetically.

Was the tallest building in Milwaukee upon completion

Rank	Name	Image	Location	Height ft (m)	Floors	Year	Purpose	Notes
1	U.S. Bank Center		43°02′18″N 87°54′08″W	601 (183.2)	42	1973	Office	Tallest building in the state; previously called the First Wisconsin Center (1973–92) and the Firstar Center (1992–2002). The building won a Distinguished Building Award from the Chicago Chapter of the American Institute of Architects in 1974. Tallest building completed in Milwaukee in the 1970s.
2	Northwestern Mutual Tower and Commons		43°02′24″N 87°54′01″W	554 (169)	32	2017	Office	Largest building in Wisconsin by square footage, and the second-tallest in the state. Tallest building completed in Milwaukee in the 2010s.
3	100 East Wisconsin		43°02′20″N 87°54′34″W	548 (167)	37	1989	Office	Designed as a postmodern version of old German vernacular architecture and built on the site of the former 14-story Pabst skyscraper, this was the second tallest building in the state for 28 years. Tallest building completed in Milwaukee in the 1980s.
4	The Couture		43°02′14″N 87°53′58″W	537 (163.7)	47	2024	Residential	Tallest residential building in Wisconsin. Tallest building completed in Milwaukee in the 2020s.
5	University Club Tower		43°02′32″N 87°53′59″W	446 (136)	36	2007	Residential	Tallest building completed in Milwaukee in the 2000s.
6	Associated Bank River Center		43°02′30″N 87°54′42″W	426 (129.9)	28	1988	Office	Second-tallest building in Milwaukee at the time of completion. Formerly known as the Milwaukee Center until 2019. In 2016, Associated Bank, the largest Wisconsin-based bank, purchased the building for 60.5 million dollars.
7	411 East Wisconsin Center		43°02′18″N 87°54′22″W	408 (124.4)	30	1985	Office	Constructed with 1,200 eight-ton, pre-cast concrete panels in a modern architectural style. Riverview Realty Partners purchased the building in 2014. The new owners have tried to make this a Green Building. The building boasts a 5-story high lobby.
8	7Seventy7	7Seventy7 Building	43°02′26″N 87°54′12″W	387 (118)	34	2018	Residential	The residential tower includes 310 apartments, parking, retail, and a public plaza.
9	Kilbourn Tower		43°02′33″N 87°53′59″W	380 (115.8)	33	2005	Residential	Luxury condominium building. In 2018, the entire 31st floor was a single condominium which was priced at $1.8 million.
10	Milwaukee City Hall		43°02′30″N 87°54′35″W	353 (107.6)	15	1895	Government	Tallest habitable building in the world for more than four years after completion (1895–99). Tallest building in Milwaukee for nearly 80 years, until it was surpassed by U.S. Bank Center in 1973. Tallest building completed in Milwaukee in the 19th century.
11	Northwestern Mutual North Tower		43°02′27″N 87°54′03″W	349 (106.4)	19	1990	Office	Tallest building completed in Milwaukee in the 1990s. The light blue pyramid at the top is lit at night. In 2023, Northwestern Mutual announced a major renovation to the North Tower. It is under renovation as of 2025.
12	The Moderne		43°02′43″N 87°54′54″W	348 (106.1)	30	2012	Residential	Tallest building in Wisconsin west of the Milwaukee River.
13	333 North Water		43°02′05″N 87°54′33″W	347 (105.8)	31	2024	Residential	Tallest building in Milwaukee south of Interstate 794. The residential tower boasts the highest rents in Milwaukee on a per-square-foot basis.
14	BMO Tower	New BMO Tower 790 N Water St, Milwaukee, WI 53202	43°02′27″N 87°54′32″W	335 (102.1)	23	2020	Office	Bank of Montreal's new 360,000-square-foot, 25-story office tower was turned over to occupants in April 2020.
15	AT&T Building		43°02′22″N 87°54′27″W	313 (95.4)	19	1924	Office	Tallest building completed in Milwaukee in the 1920s. Tallest high-rise building in Milwaukee from 1924 to 1973.
16	1000 North Water Street		43°02′38″N 87°54′37″W	295 (90)	16	1991	Office	The light pink facade and windows give it a unique appearance in Milwaukee's skyline. The building also is home to the Milwaukee field office of the Bureau of Alcohol, Tobacco and Firearms.
17	Chase Tower		43°02′16″N 87°54′34″W	288 (87.8)	22	1961	Office	Third-tallest building in Milwaukee at the time of completion. Tallest building completed in Milwaukee in the 1960s. Once the site of the Marine Bank, it was known as Bank One Plaza before Bank One's merger with Chase. Contains 480,000 square feet of Class A office space and houses Milwaukee Public Radio.
18	Ascent MKE		43°02′36″N 87°54′11″W	284 (86.6)	25	2022	Residential	The 25-story, 493,000 square-foot structure is the world's tallest timber structure.
19	Allen-Bradley Clock Tower		43°01′07″N 87°54′47″W	283 (86.3)	17	1962	Office	Headquarters of Rockwell Automation. The world's second-largest four-sided clock sits atop this tower.
20	Wisconsin Tower		43°02′21″N 87°55′09″W	280 (85.4)	22	1930	Residential	Also known as the 606 Building. Tallest building completed in Milwaukee in the 1930s. Originally and office building, the 22 story Art-Deco tower was converted into 74 condominiums in 2006.
21	BMO Harris Bank Building		43°02′25″N 87°54′32″W	277 (84.4)	21	1969	Office	Former headquarters of M&I Bank, the largest bank based in Wisconsin, and hence formerly known as the Marshall & Ilsley Bank Building.
22	Bay View Terrace		42°59′57″N 87°53′18″W	275 (83.8)	25	1964	Residential	Tallest building on Milwaukee's south side. The north and south facades have no windows, save for the balcony doors.
23	St. Johns on the Lake - North Tower		43°03′15″N 87°53′20″W	274 (83.5) (Note: Sources do not state the exact height of this building. This figure was determined using Google Earth by subtracting the altitude of the building's lowest main pedestrian open-air entrance from its highest architectural point.)	22	2020	Residential	The new building was opened in March 2020 and includes 79 independent living units, 16 catered living units, a lecture hall/performance space and two levels of below-grade parking.
24	Hilton Milwaukee City Center		43°02′18″N 87°55′04″W	274 (83.5)	25	1927	Hotel	Third-tallest building in Milwaukee at the time of completion. The antenna on top brings the total height of the building to 630 feet (192 m). This hotel is the largest in Milwaukee when measured by the number of rooms (729).
25	Regency House		43°02′37″N 87°54′00″W	265 (80.8)	27	1969	Residential	High-rise in the "East Town" neighborhood. In 1974 the apartments were sold as condominiums.
26	Juneau Village		43°02′38″N 87°54′19″W	264 (80.5)	27	1965	Residential	The building is owned by Lore Hauck. Rent starts at $600 for a one bedroom.
27	The Potawatomi Casino Hotel		43°01′51″N 87°56′05″W	264 (80.4)	20	2014	Hotel	Contains a casino. The hotel underwent an expansion in 2019, adding a second interconnected tower and bringing it to 500 rooms.
28	Yankee Hill Apartments 1		43°02′36″N 87°54′13″W	261 (79.5)	23	1987	Residential	
29	The BreakWater		43°02′50″N 87°53′50″W	260 (79.3)	21	2009	Residential	
30	833 East Michigan		43°02′15″N 87°54′03″W	257 (78)	17	2016	Office	
31	633 Building		43°02′19″N 87°55′12″W	252 (77)	20	1964	Office	In 2017 a real estate developer (J. Jeffers & Co.) purchased the building. A 40-foot sign advertising Miller Brewing Company is situated atop the tower.
32	Basilica of St. Josaphat		43°00′09″N 87°55′09″W	250 (76.2)	1	1897	Religious	The Basilica of St. Josaphat is the tallest church in Milwaukee. The dome on this church is the world's sixth largest.
33	Wisconsin Gas Building		43°02′21″N 87°54′12″W	250 (76.2)	20	1930	Office	The light on top turns either red, blue, or gold depending on the weather forecast for the following day.
34	The Pfister Hotel		43°02′23″N 87°54′21″W	250 (76.2)	21	1965	Hotel	The hotel itself dates back to the late 19th century. Visitors have claimed it is haunted. The tower was added to the hotel in 1965.
35	Arlington Court Apartments		43°03′08″N 87°53′45″W	250 (76.2)	24	1969	Residential	This high-rise is managed by the Milwaukee Housing Authority, and contains 230 one bedroom apartments. In order to live in this building a tenant must be 50 years old or older, or be an adult with a disability.
36	Locust Court Apartments		43°04′18″N 87°53′40″W	250 (76.2)	24	1969	Residential	In 2019, the Milwaukee Housing Authority considered tearing the building down to make way for a mixed income development.
37	St. Johns on the Lake - South Tower	Saint Johns on the lake 1840 N Prospect Ave Milwaukee WI 53202	43°03′12″N 87°53′23″W	250 (76.2)	21	2011	Residential	
38	Landmark on the Lake		43°03′06″N 87°53′28″W	248 (75.6)	26	1991	Residential	The building is 248 feet tall from the Prospect Avenue entrance; the building is 350 feet tall at the rear. There are 275 condominium units in the 27 floor high rise.
39	Cathedral Place		43°02′27″N 87°54′16″W	244 (74.3)	19	2004	Mixed-use	A mixed-use tower where the 27 residential units are on the lower floors, and the 200,000 square feet of office space is on the upper floors. The building won a Distinguished Building Award from the Chicago Chapter of the American Institute of Architects in 2005.
40	Sandburg Hall North		43°04′47″N 87°52′54″W	242 (73.9)	27	1971	Residential	Part of the University of Wisconsin–Milwaukee The North Tower's height reaches 482 feet (147 m) with the antenna.
41	Riverview Apartments	Riverview Apartments 1300 E Kane Pl, Milwaukee, WI 53202	43°03′23″N 87°53′42″W	242 (73.8)	19	1964	Residential	This building is owned and managed by The Milwaukee Public Housing Authority. It is considered low income housing, and rent can be as low as $50.
42	Yankee Hill Apartments 2		43°02′39″N 87°54′13″W	242 (73.8)	23	1987	Residential	
43	Diamond Tower		43°03′05″N 87°53′33″W	238 (72.4)	21	1982	Residential	Contains 113 condos.
44	Straz Tower	Stratz building 915 W Wisconsin Ave Milwaukee WI 53233	43°02′18″N 87°55′25″W	229 (69.9)	18	1954	Office	Formerly the YMCA Building. This building is on the Marquette University Campus. Tallest building completed in Milwaukee in the 1950s.
45	Two-Fifty	250 Plazza 250 E WISCONSIN AVE Milwaukee WI 53202	43°02′21″N 87°54′29″W	229 (69.9)	18	1973	Office	Klug & Smith Co designed the 14-story office building on the site. The 19-story contemporary-style tower was designed by Perkins & Will. Formerly known as 250 Plaza.
46	Hyatt Regency Milwaukee		43°02′28″N 87°54′54″W	229 (69.8)	18	1980	Hotel	
47	Cudahy Tower		43°02′29″N 87°53′59″W	224 (68.4)	16	1928	Mixed-use	Mixed-use residential and office building.
48	Prospect Tower	Prospect Tower 1626 N Prospect Ave Milwaukee WI 53202	43°03′04″N 87°53′30″W	217 (66.1)	23	1964	Residential	
49	CityCenter at 735	City Center 735 N Water St, Milwaukee, WI 53202	43°02′22″N 87°54′35″W	216 (65.8)	16	1914	Office	Tallest building completed in Milwaukee in the 1910s. Tallest high-rise building in Milwaukee from 1914 to 1924.
50	Park Lafayette North Tower	Park Lafayette North Tower 1918 E Lafayette Place Milwaukee WI 53202	43°03′24″N 87°53′12″W	216 (65.8)	20	2009	Residential	
51	Park Lafayette South Tower	Park Lafayette South Tower 1918 E Lafayette Place Milwaukee WI 53202	43°03′22″N 87°53′13″W	216 (65.8)	20	2009	Residential	
52	Wells Building	Wells Building 324 E Wisconsin Ave Milwaukee WI 53202	43°02′20″N 87°54′25″W	212 (64.6)	15	1901	Office	Tallest building completed in Milwaukee in the 1900s. Tallest high-rise building in Milwaukee from 1901 to 1914.
53	Catholic Financial Life Building		43°02′26″N 87°55′34″W	210 (64)	18	1970	Office	

=== Tallest buildings by pinnacle height ===
This list ranks Milwaukee skyscrapers based on their pinnacle height, which includes radio masts and antennas. Standard architectural height measurements, which excludes antennas in building heights, are included for comparative purposes. The "Year" column indicates the year in which a building was completed.

Pinn. Rank	Std. Rank	Name	Pinnacle height ft (m)	Standard height ft (m)	Floors	Year
1	24	Hilton Milwaukee City Center	630 (192)	274 (83.5)	25	1927
2	1	U.S. Bank Center	601 (183.2)	601 (183.2)	42	1973
3	2	Northwestern Mutual Tower and Commons	554 (169)	554 (169)	32	2017
4	3	100 East Wisconsin	549 (167)	549 (167)	37	1989
5	4	The Couture	537 (163.7)	537 (163.7)	47	2024
6	40	Sandburg Hall North	482 (147)	242 (73.9)	27	1971
7	5	University Club Tower	446 (136)	446 (136)	35	2007
8	6	Associated Bank River Center	426 (129.9)	426 (129.9)	28	1988
9	7	411 East Wisconsin Center	408 (124.4)	408 (124.4)	30	1985
10	8	7Seventy7	387 (118)	387 (118)	34	2018

== Tallest under construction ==
There is one building under construction in Milwaukee that is planned to be at least 200 ft (61 m) tall as of 2026, based on standard height measurement.

Name	Height ft (m)	Floors	Expected year of completion	Notes
The Edison	362 (110)	32	2027	Groundbreaking started in March 2025 with completion planned for 2027. Originally planned for 15 stories, it was later updated to be 32 stories. The mass-timber residential high-rise would likely be the tallest mass timber tower in the United States when completed.

== Tallest demolished ==
There have been three demolished buildings in Milwaukee that once stood taller than 200 feet (61 m) in height.

Name	Image	Height ft (m)	Floors	Year Completed	Year Demolished	Notes
Northwestern Mutual Place		283 (86)	16	1979	2014	Demolished and replaced with the Northwestern Mutual Tower and Commons
Pabst Building		235 (72)	14	1891	1981	Tallest building in Milwaukee from 1891 to 1895.
Lake Front Depot		234 (71)	N/A	1889	1968	

== Timeline of tallest buildings ==
Name	Image	Years as tallest	Height ft (m)	Floors	Year	Notes
Pabst Building		1891–1895	235 (72)	14	1891	The Pabst Building was 14 stories, tall constructed in a neo-gothic style. Great detailing and a granite arch at the entrance. This building was Milwaukee's first skyscraper: at the time the Pabst was the tallest building in Milwaukee. The building was demolished in 1981, 100 East Wisconsin was constructed on this site eight years later.
Milwaukee City Hall		1895–1973	353 (108)	15	1895	Dominated the Milwaukee skyline for nearly eighty years and was the tallest habitable building in the world at completion.
U.S. Bank Center		1973–present	601 (183)	42	1973	Tallest building in Wisconsin since its completion. A square block was cleared to make way for The First Wisconsin building.

== See also ==
- List of tallest buildings in Madison
- List of tallest buildings in Wisconsin
