= 1000 North Water Street =

Skyscraper in Milwaukee, Wisconsin

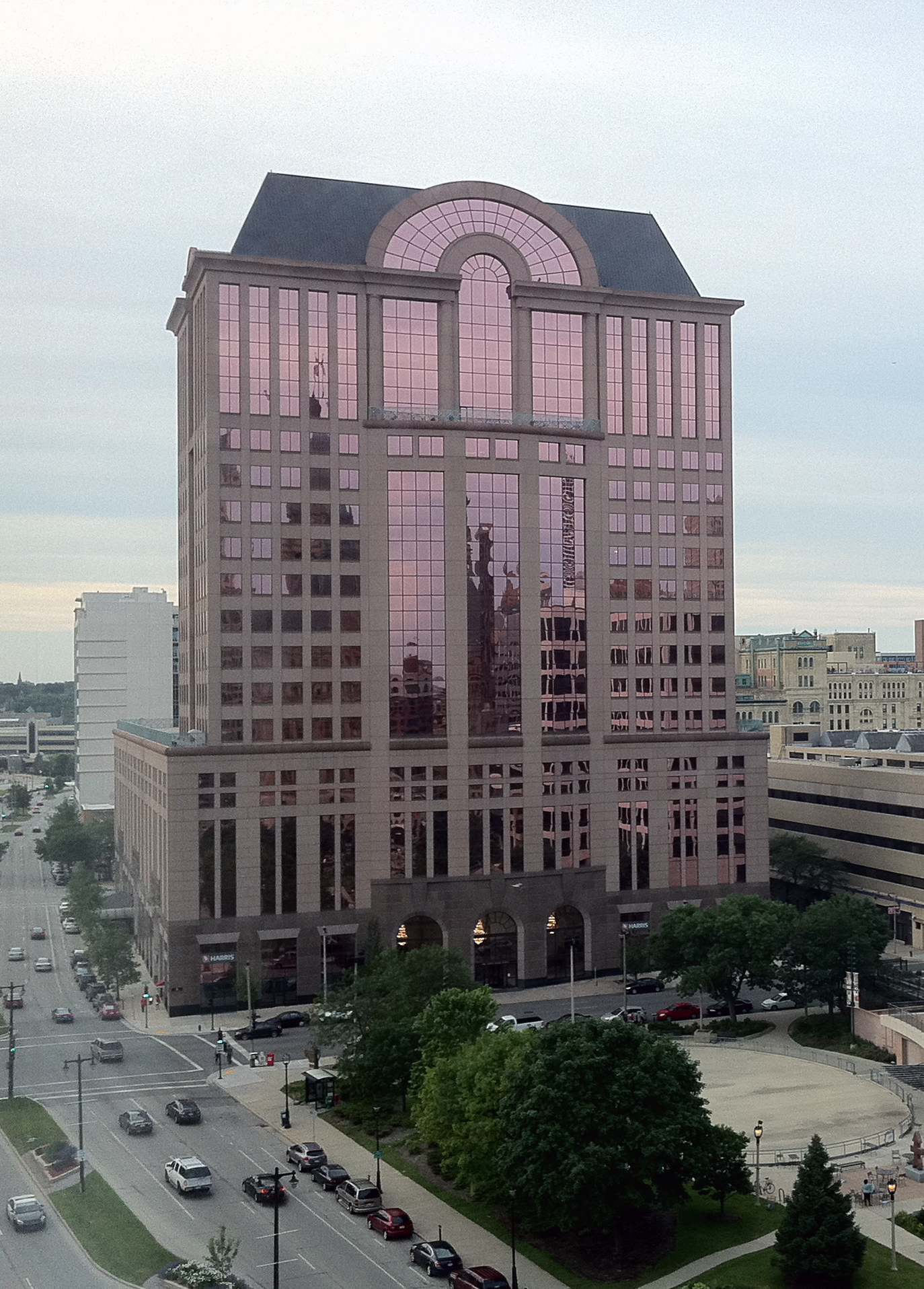
- Interactive map of the 1000 North Water Street area

General information
- Status: Completed
- Type: Class B Commercial office
- Architectural style: Postmodern
- Location: Milwaukee, Wisconsin, United States
- Coordinates: 43.0438°N 87.9102°W
- Completed: 1991

Height
- Height: 296 ft (90 m)

Technical details
- Structural system: Steel frame
- Floor count: 16

Design and construction
- Architecture firm: Harwood K. Smith & Partners

Other information
- Public transit: MCTS

1000 North Water Street is a 16-story 296-foot-tall (90 m) post-modern high-rise office building in Milwaukee, in the U.S. state of Wisconsin. It is the twelfth-tallest building in Milwaukee, and was completed in 1991, right at the tail end of a construction boom in Milwaukee that started in the late 1980s, and included 100 East Wisconsin, Northwestern Mutual Tower, and the Milwaukee Center. The facade and windows are a light pink color, giving it a unique appearance among Milwaukee's skyline.

A portion of the building is a parking garage, owned by the City of Milwaukee, with 1,542 parking stalls. The U.S. Department of Homeland Security maintains a private section in the parking garage for storage and investigations.
