= Moderne =

Moderne may refer to:

== Architectural styles ==
- Moderne architecture, 1925–1940s
- PWA Moderne, 1933–1944 United States
- Streamline Moderne, Art Deco branch around 1937

== Buildings ==
- Grand Hotel Moderne, Lourdes, France
- The Moderne, Milwaukee, Wisconsin, United States
- Moderne Cinema, Bournemouth, England

== Other uses ==
- Gibson Moderne, a 1957 electric guitar model
- Jacques Moderne (c. 1497 – c. 1560), Italian-French music publisher
- Wiener Moderne, the culture of Vienna, 1890–1910

== See also ==
- Modernisme, a Catalan version of Moderne architecture
