= The Edison (skyscraper) =

Under-construction high-rise in Milwaukee, Wisconsin

- Unfinished foundation of the Edison, as seen in September 2026

General information
- Status: On hold
- Location: 1005 North Edison Street, Milwaukee, Wisconsin
- Coordinates: 43.0436569734289°N 87.91254953947164°W
- Groundbreaking: June, 2025

Height
- Height: 362 feet (110 m)

Technical details
- Floor count: 31

Design and construction
- Architect: Thronton Tomasetti
- Developer: Neutral
- Main contractor: C.D. Smith

Other information
- Parking: 288

The Edison is a planned 31-story high-rise tower in Milwaukee, Wisconsin, US. Developed by Madison-based developer Neutral, the tower is planned to stand at a height of 362 feet (110 m), containing 378 luxury apartment units upon completion and will become the new tallest mass timber building in the world and surpassing the current record holder, the Ascent MKE. Construction of the tower first began in June 2025.

In September 2025, construction was halted due to significant cost issues and failure to pay the Fond du Lac–based general contractor C.D. Smith Construction, cited by Neutral as a result of the Trump administration's tariffs, with Milwaukee County Circuit Court Judge Glen Yamahiro defaulting the property on June 29, 2026.

== History ==
The Edison was originally proposed in 2021 by Madison-based developer Neutral as a 15-story, 220-unit building to be erected along Milwaukee's riverfront, with plans involving the demolition of the Rojahn & Malaney Co. floral warehouse located on the site. In January 2025, the company secured $133 million in additional financing from Arkansas-based Bank OZK and Chicago-based Pearlmark Real Estate for the project, with the projected cost at $203 million.

Neutral hired Chicago-based engineer firm Forefront Structural Engineers, New York–based architectural firm Thornton Tomasetti for the structure's façade and C.D. Smith Construction as the project contractor; the latter had previously worked on the current tallest mass timber tower, the Ascent MKE. The ground breaking ceremony was held in June 2025, with construction planned to be completed in 2027.

In September of 2025, construction on the tower was paused by contractor C.D. Smith Construction, with developer Neutral failing to pay $11.3 million out of the estimated $13.67 million of work that had been performed. Neutral cited the Trump administration's tariffs placed on imported and exported goods as the cause of the failure to pay, with the construction cost increasing to $230 million and the company unable to cover the additional costs. C.D. Smith file a lawsuit against Neutral in March 2025, alleging Neutral's failure to finance the work performed; Neutral failed to appear in court nor file a legally valid response by Wisconsin's statutory deadline, and thus Judge Glen Yamahiro granted default judgement to C.D. Smith. The company plans to submit a request for a foreclosure order on the property.

== Design ==
The Edison is planned to be a 31-floor, 362 feet (110 m) tall luxury apartment tower, containing 357 units in various layouts, including studios and 3-bedroom dwellings. It will contain 7,000 square feet (650 m^{2}) of ground-floor retail space, a parking garage containing 288 parking spaces for residents and visitors, and an amenity floor available to residents containing a spa, gym, pool, sauna, and health clinic available to residents, as well as a community garden on the roof. The design also features 2 public plazas placed on the side of the tower and along the Milwaukee river. Additional amenities including a spa, gym, pool, sauna, and health clinic available to residents, as well as a café, office space, and grocery store on the first floor,

Engineering of the Edison utilizes a hybrid structural system, employing cross-laminated timber panels over a concrete base to construct the building, and it is expected to use over 100,000 cubic feet of lumber. Cooling and heating will be handled via water-source heat pumps from the Milwaukee River to manage building temperatures and ventilation.

== See also ==
- Ascent MKE
- Mass timber
- List of tallest buildings in Milwaukee
