= AT&T Center (Milwaukee) =

Skyscraper in Milwaukee, Wisconsin

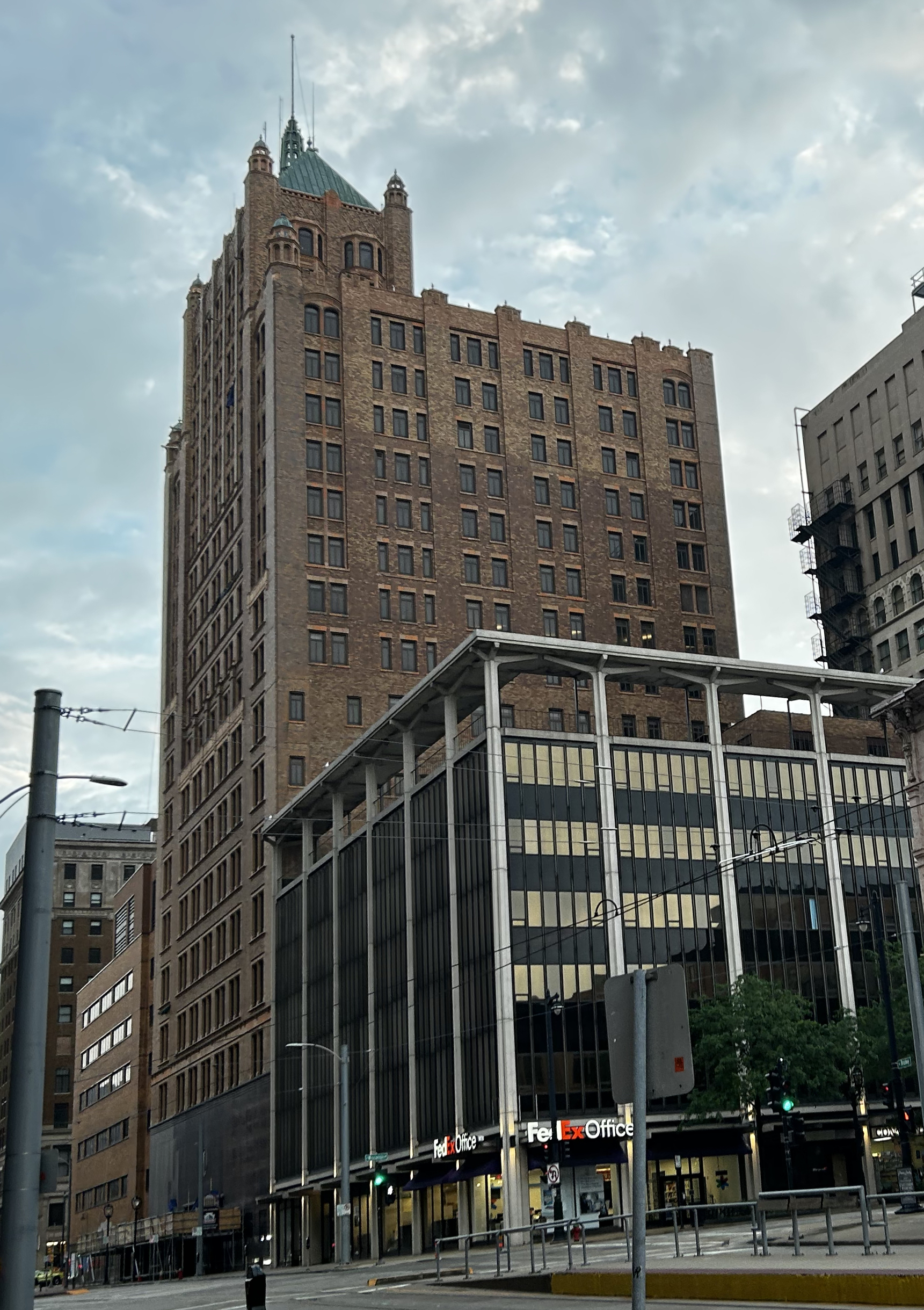
- Photographed in 2024

- Location within Wisconsin
- Alternative names: Wisconsin Telephone Building

General information
- Status: Completed
- Type: Commercial office
- Architectural style: neo-Gothic
- Location: Milwaukee, Wisconsin, United States, 722 North Broadway
- Coordinates: 43.0393°N 87.9075°W
- Construction started: 1918
- Completed: 1924
- Landlord: AT&T

Height
- Height: 313 ft (95 m)

Technical details
- Structural system: steel frame
- Floor count: 19
- Lifts/elevators: 6

Design and construction
- Architecture firm: Eschweiler & Eschweiler

Other information
- Public transit access: MCTS; The Hop

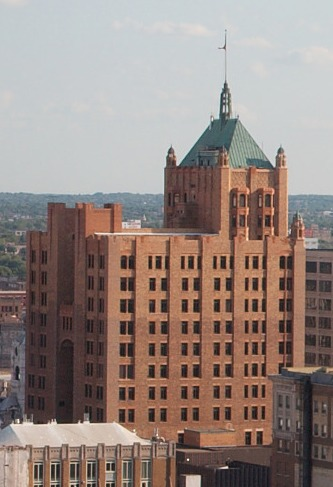
Photographed in 2010

The AT&T Center is a 19-story, 313-foot-tall neo-Gothic building in downtown Milwaukee, Wisconsin. Construction began in 1918 for Wisconsin Telephone and was completed in 1924. It houses the AT&T Wisconsin headquarters.

The Eschweiler & Eschweiler architecture firm designed the AT&T Center. Alexander C. Eschweiler opened the firm in 1892 and later his three sons would join the firm in 1924. The firm was also behind the designs of the Milwaukee Gas Light Building, The Milwaukee Arena, The Milwaukee County School of Agriculture and Domestic Economy as well as many mansions in the Historic Water Tower neighborhood.
