= 100 East Wisconsin =

Office building in Milwaukee, Wisconsin

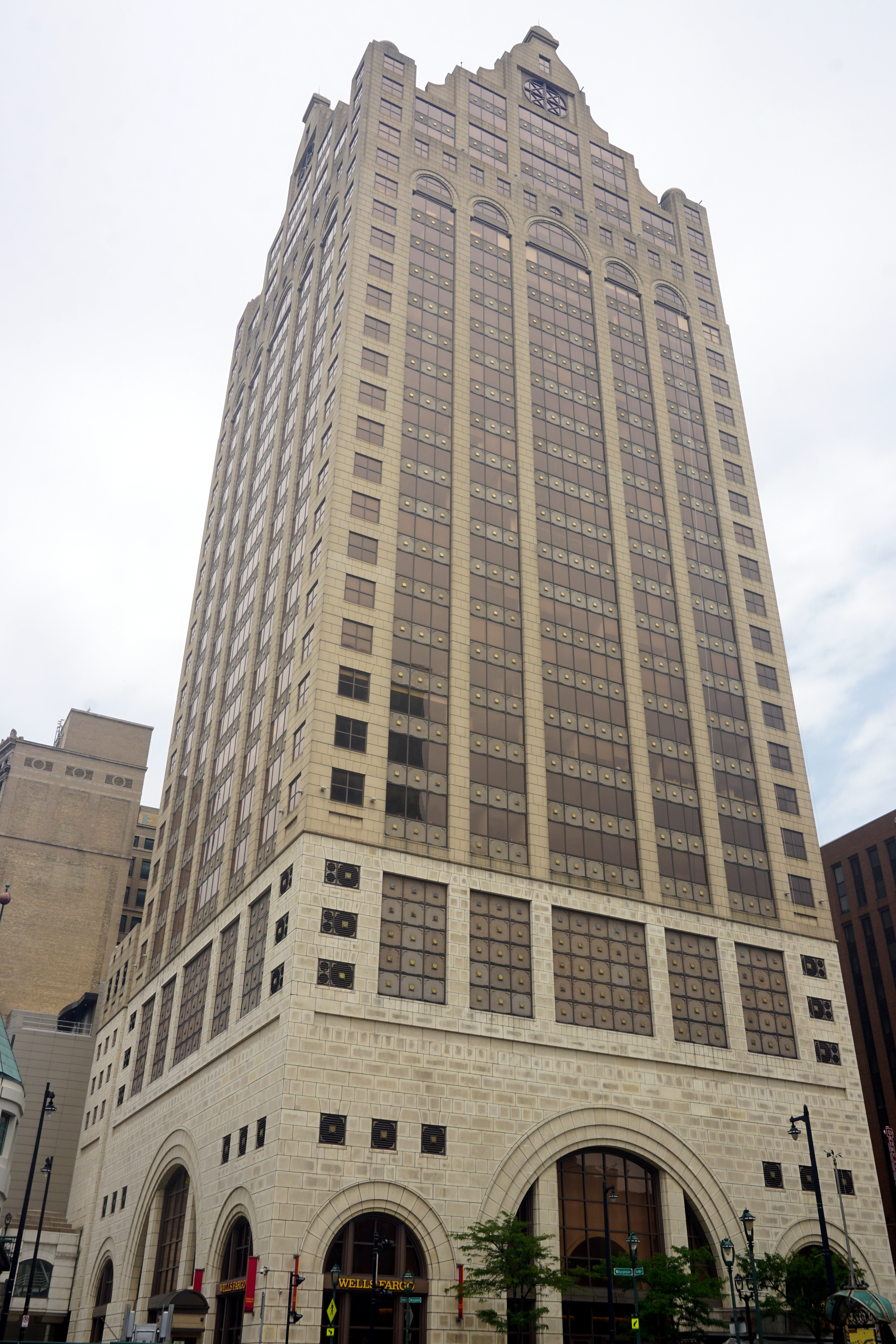
- View from the Milwaukee River

- Location within Wisconsin
- Former names: Faison Building

General information
- Type: Office
- Architectural style: Postmodern
- Location: Milwaukee, Wisconsin, US, 100 East Wisconsin Avenue
- Coordinates: 43°2′20.47″N 87°54′34.02″W
- Construction started: 1987
- Completed: 1989

Height
- Height: 549 feet (167 m)

Technical details
- Floor count: 37

Design and construction
- Architect: LS3P Associates
- Architecture firm: Clark, Tribble, Harris & Li
- Structural engineer: King Guinn Associates

Other information
- Public transit: MCTS; The Hop

U.S. National Register of Historic Places
- Designated: January 16, 2025
- Reference no.: 100011290

100 East Wisconsin or The Faison Building is a 37-story, 549 ft (167 m)-tall skyscraper located in downtown Milwaukee, Wisconsin. Erected in 1989 on the site of the old Pabst Building, its design is reflective of the German-American architecture that has been preserved in downtown Milwaukee, much like Detroit's Ally Detroit Center. The building is bordered on the west by the Milwaukee River along the Milwaukee Riverwalk. It is the fourth tallest building in Wisconsin, behind the U.S. Bank Center, The Couture (Milwaukee) and the Northwestern Mutual Tower and Commons also located in downtown Milwaukee.

== History ==
The location of 100 East Wisconsin at the northwest corner of East Wisconsin avenue and North Water Street has historically been viewed as the oldest building site within the city. This was the location of Milwaukee's first European settlement by Henry Vieau, the site of city founder Solomon Juneau's original cabin and trading post constructed in 1820 and the site of the 235-foot (72 m), 14-story Pabst Building constructed in 1891 and demolished in 1981.

After failing to develop a high-rise called River Place in the early 1980s, the owners of the property at 100 East Wisconsin sold the property to Charlotte developer Faison Associates in December 1987. Following the purchase, in January 1987 Faison released renderings of the tower designed by the Charlotte architecture firm of Clark, Tribble, Harris & Li. The tower was to rise as the second tallest building in the city, behind the U.S. Bank Center, contain 430,000 square feet (40,000 m^{2}) of office space and 410 parking spaces.

With plans in place, in March 1987 workers began deconstruct of the park in place at the location of the tower. The landscaping removed was relocated to Marquette University and the benches donated to the West End Community Center. Construction of the concrete framed structure began in mid-1987 with occupancy occurring in April 1989.

Between 2016 and 2023, several of the building's major tenants announced that they would be vacating their spaces. A number of these businesses moved up Water Street to the newly opened BMO Tower. In 2023, Klein Development and developer and investor John Vassalllo purchased the building and announced plans to convert the building into 350 luxury apartments by 2026. The buildings small floorplates make it unattractive to modern office use, but the high quality of construction, views and location make it appealing to residential conversion. As part of its plan to finance a conversion of the tower for residential uses, 100 East Wisconsin was granted a federal and state historic designation.

== Architecture ==
Designed by Clark, Tribble, Harris & Li, the tower features a rectangular footprint and is topped with a crown similar to that of the former Pabst Building and the Milwaukee City Hall. Additionally, the arches at the base were designed also to pay homage to those at the base of the Pabst Building of the Flemish Renaissance style.

The building was added to the National Register of Historic Places (NRHP) on January 16, 2025.

== See also ==
- List of tallest buildings in Milwaukee

Records
Preceded by Milwaukee Center	2nd Tallest building in Milwaukee; 1989—2017; 167m	Succeeded by Northwestern Mutual Tower and Commons
