= Ascent MKE =

High-rise building in Milwaukee, Wisconsin, US

Coordinates: 43°2′36″N 87°54′11″W

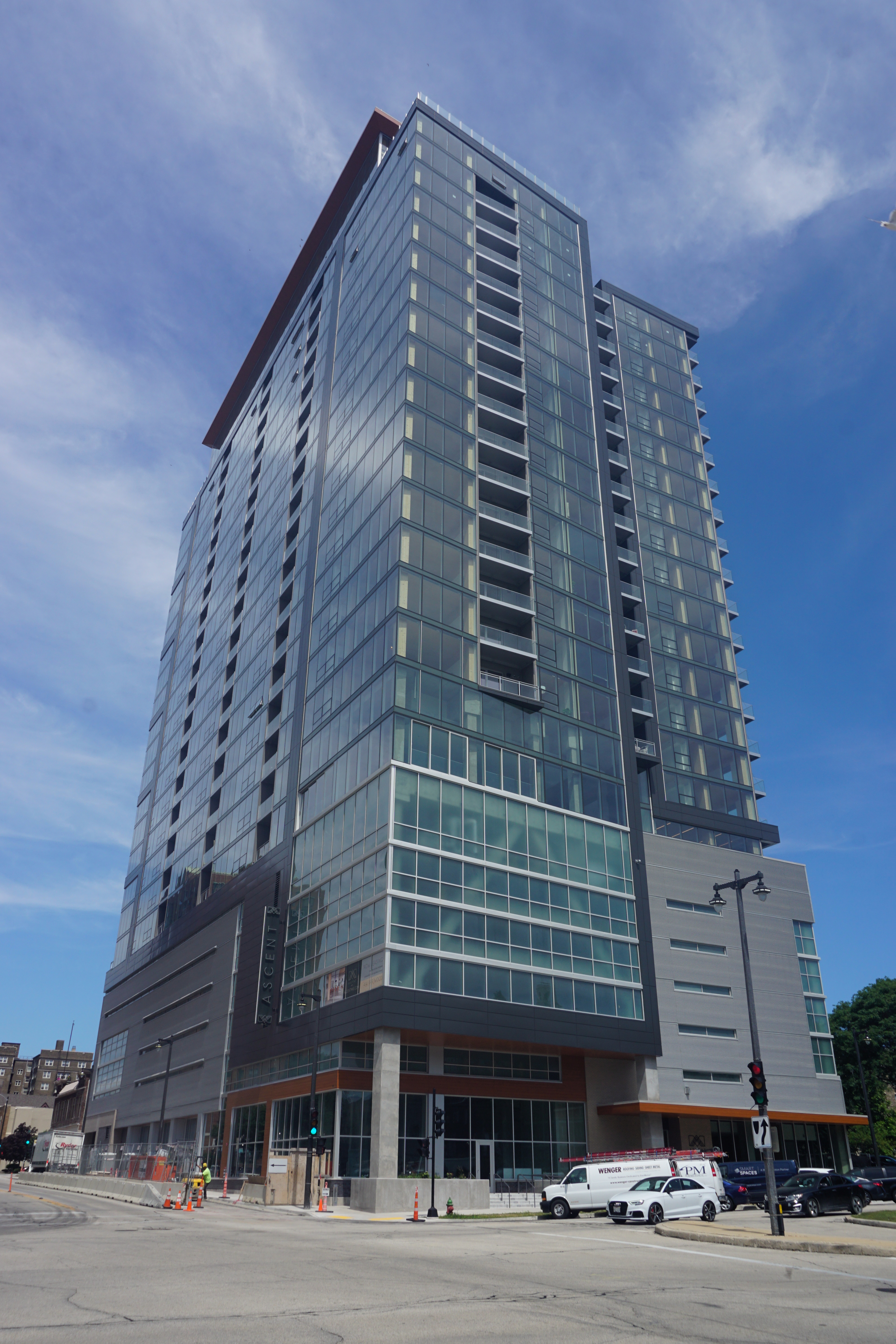
- Ascent, the world's tallest mass timber hybrid building, at completion in 2022

General information
- Status: Completed
- Type: Residential
- Location: 700 E. Kilbourn Ave. Milwaukee, Wisconsin; United States
- Construction started: 2020
- Opening: 2022

Technical details
- Floor count: 25

Design and construction
- Architect: Korb + Associates
- Developer: New Land Enterprises/ Wiechmann Enterprises

Other information
- Public transit: MCTS; The Hop

Website
- ascentmke.com

Ascent MKE is a mass timber hybrid high-rise apartment building in Milwaukee, Wisconsin. The 284-foot (87 meter), 25-story high-rise is the world's tallest mass timber tower, marginally taller than the former record holder Mjøstårnet in Brumunddal, Norway. It features 259 luxury apartments, retail space, an elevated pool with operable window walls, and a sky-deck.

== History ==
Plans for the project were first unveiled in 2018. It was later presented at the 2018 international CTBUH conference in Dubai, the 2019 international CTBUH conference in Chicago, and the 2019 International Mass Timber Conference in Portland.

In May 2019, Ascent was named a recipient of a U.S. Department of Agriculture grant awarded through the Forest Service's Wood Innovations Grant program. The federal grant assisted with the testing needed to prove mass timber's ability to perform as well as traditional building materials like concrete and steel to meet U.S. building codes.

Initially consisting of 21 floors, the design was updated with subsequent approvals, increasing the total height to 25 floors in March 2020.

Construction on Ascent began in August 2020, and the building was completed in August 2022.

== See also ==
- List of tallest wooden buildings
- List of tallest buildings in Milwaukee
- Mjøstårnet, previous record holder
- The Edison, a halted tower planned to surpass Ascent MKE
