= 833 East Michigan =

Commercial office in Milwaukee, Wisconsin

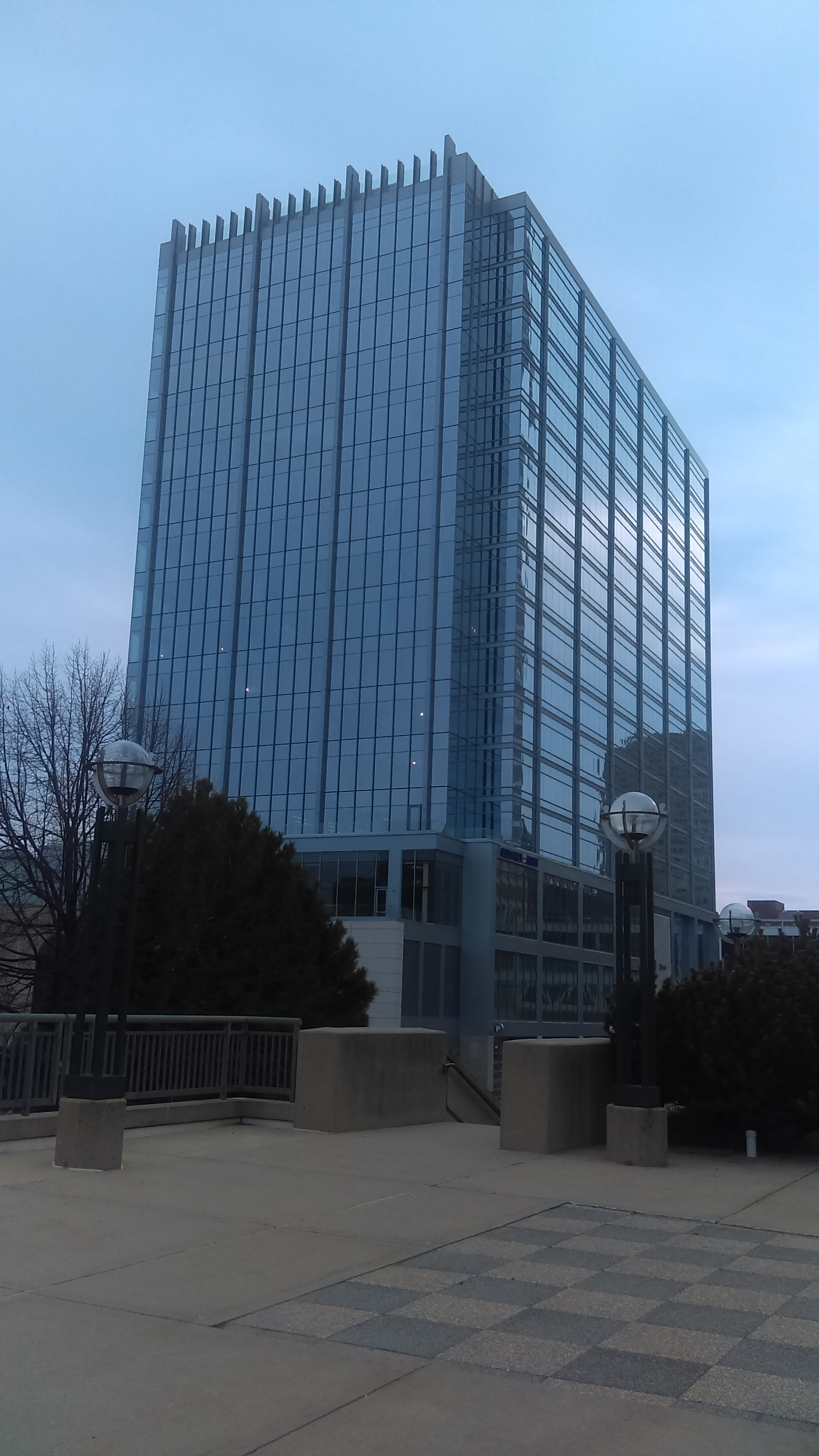
- The building from the northeast in 2016

General information
- Status: Completed
- Coordinates: 43.03749681198614°N 87.90079268650292°W
- Construction started: July 2014
- Completed: March 2016
- Owner: 833 Development Partners

Height
- Height: 258 ft (79 m)

Technical details
- Floor count: 18
- Floor area: 358,000 sq ft

Design and construction
- Architecture firm: Kahler Slater
- Developer: Irgens Partners
- Main contractor: CG Schmidt

833 East Michigan is an 18-story, 258-foot-tall (79 m) skyscraper in Milwaukee, Wisconsin. Major tenants of 833 East Michigan include Godfrey & Kahn, Adient, Irgens, and KPMG. The building is located at 833 E. Michigan Street.

== History ==
In 2013, developer Irgens Partners announced plans to build a 17-story office building in downtown Milwaukee with an estimated 357,000 square feet of space. A groundbreaking ceremony for the tower was held on June 18, 2014, with expected completion in February 2016. In 2015, it was announced that the ground floor of 833 East Michigan would feature Rare Steakhouse, a restaurant operated by Madison-based Noble Chef Hospitality. The building was opened in March 2016. Since opening, multiple major tenants have moved offices to 833 East Michigan including PwC and the Potawatomi Business Development Corporation.

== Construction ==
Construction of 833 East Michigan began in June 2014. CG Schmidt served as the general contractor for the project. The building was designed by Kahler Slater and features a 4-story lobby.

== See also ==
- List of tallest buildings in Milwaukee
