= 633 Building =

Commercial office in Milwaukee, Wisconsin

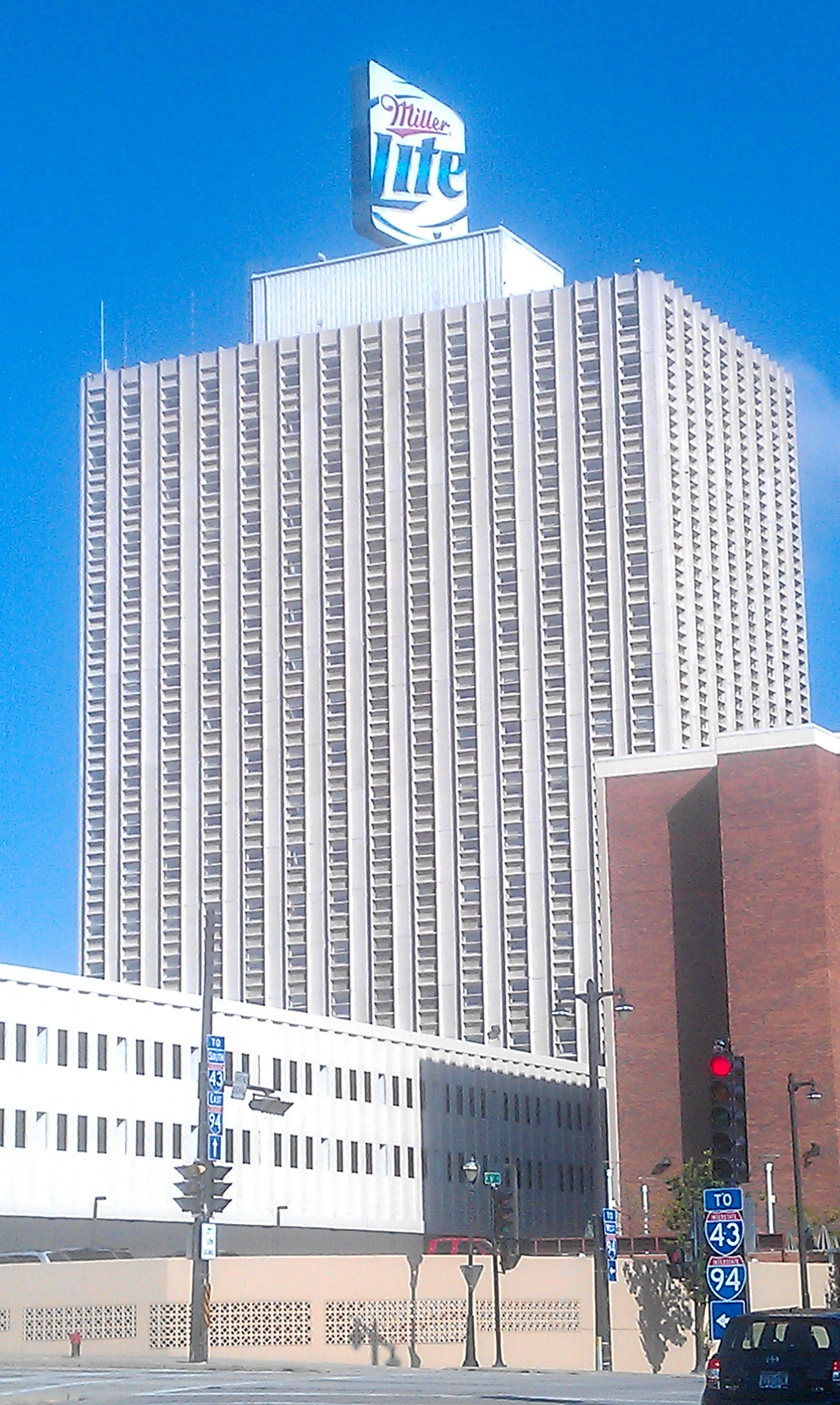
- Alternative names: Clark Building

General information
- Status: Completed
- Address: 633 W. Wisconsin Avenue
- Coordinates: 43.03818589390226°N 87.91995870826199°W
- Completed: 1964
- Height: 252 ft (77 m)

Technical details
- Floor count: 20
- Floor area: 230,500 sq ft

Design and construction
- Architect(s): Robert Lee Hall & Associates
- Main contractor: Southern Builders

633 Building, also known as the Clark Building, is a 20-story, 252-foot-tall (77 m) skyscraper in Milwaukee, Wisconsin. The tower is located at 633 W. Wisconsin Avenue.

== History ==
633 Building was constructed in 1964 and contains 230,500 square feet of office space along with 450 parking stalls in an adjoining parking garage. 633 Building was named the Clark Building in 1967 after it was sold to Clark Oil, a Milwaukee-based oil company. In 2017, the property was acquired by Milwaukee developer Josh Jeffers, who intended to redevelop the 48,000 square feet of commercial space on the southern side of the ground floor.

A 40-foot (12 m) Miller Brewing Company sign is located on top of the tower.

In January 2025, Jeffers announced plans to convert part of the building into 224 residential apartments with 180 of them qualifying as low income housing.

== Construction ==
Robert Lee Hall & Associates provided the architecture for 633 Building, while Southern Builders served as the general contractor.

== See also ==
- List of tallest buildings in Milwaukee
