= Two-Fifty =

Commercial office in Milwaukee, Wisconsin

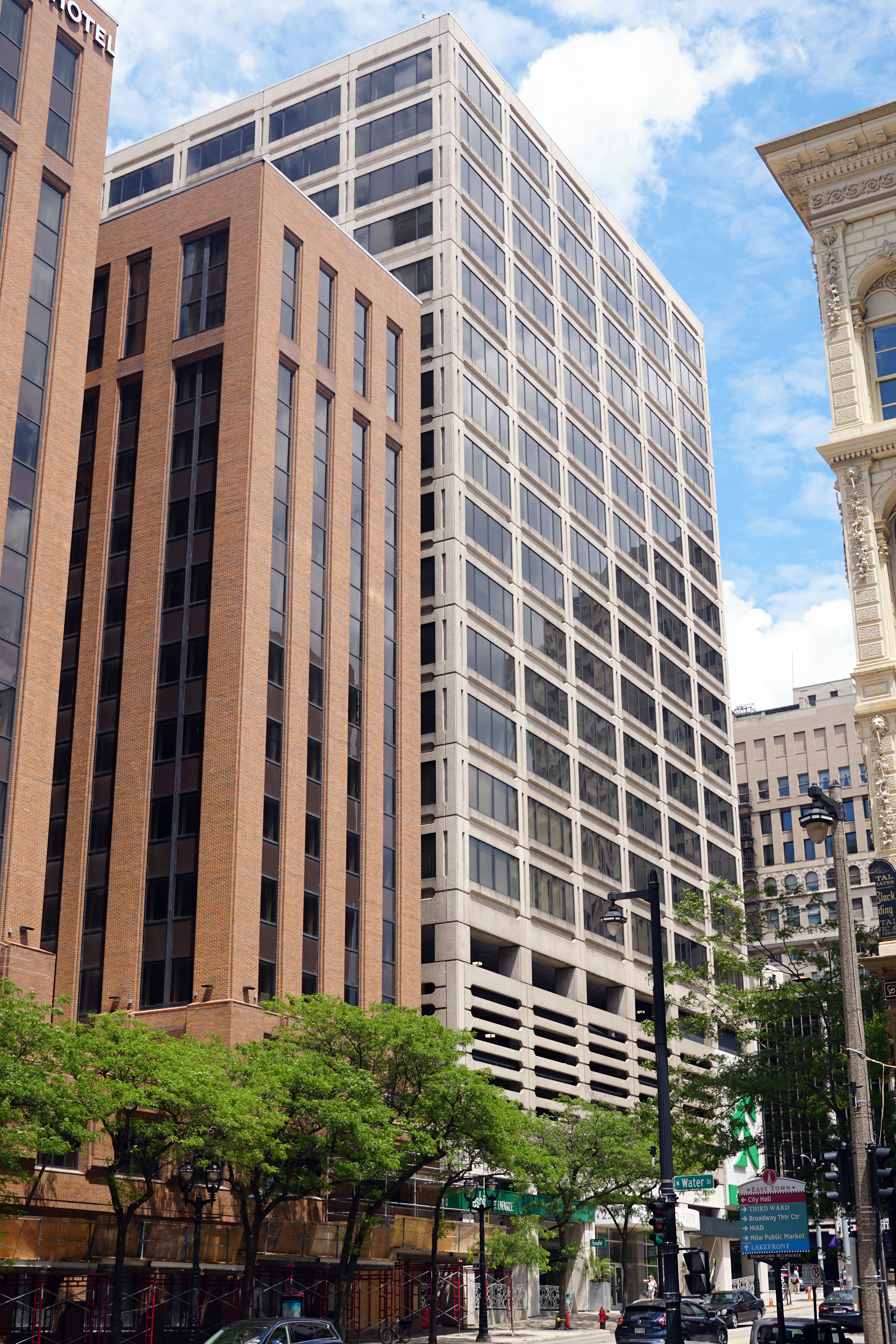
- Interactive map of the Two-Fifty area
- Former names: 250 Plaza

General information
- Status: Completed
- Location: 250 East Wisconsin Avenue
- Coordinates: 43.03898834159365°N 87.90831582395869°W
- Construction started: 1971
- Completed: 1973
- Owner: Fulcrum Asset Advisors & Millbrook Properties

Height
- Height: 229 ft (70 m)

Technical details
- Floor count: 20
- Floor area: 200,000 sq ft

Design and construction
- Architects: Perkins & Will
- Main contractor: Klug & Smith Co

Two-Fifty, formerly known as 250 Plaza, is a 20-story, 229-foot-tall (70 m) skyscraper in Milwaukee, Wisconsin. The tower contains offices, an Associated Bank branch, and ground floor commercial space. Two-Fifty is located at 250 East Wisconsin Avenue.

== History ==
Two-Fifty was originally built in 1973 as the First Savings Plaza. In 2003, anchor tenant Marcus Corp. left Two-Fifty, vacating 56,000 square feet of office space. The building would go into receivership in 2009. In August 2015, Chicago-based Fulcrum Asset Advisors and Millbrook Properties purchased Two-Fifty for $9.75 million, intending to substantially renovate the property. Since the acquisition, the owners spent around $8.5 million in improvements for Two-Fifty, including repairs to the facade and revamping of the lobby and canopy. Associated Bank announced that it would open a 2,100 square foot retail branch in Two-Fifty in 2017. As of October 2021, Two-Fifty has an 80% occupancy rate.

== Construction ==
Two-Fifty was designed by Perkins & Will, while Klug & Smith Co. served as the builder. The building began construction in 1971 and was completed in 1973.

== See also ==
- List of tallest buildings in Milwaukee
