= The Pfister Hotel =

Hotel in Milwaukee, Wisconsin, United States

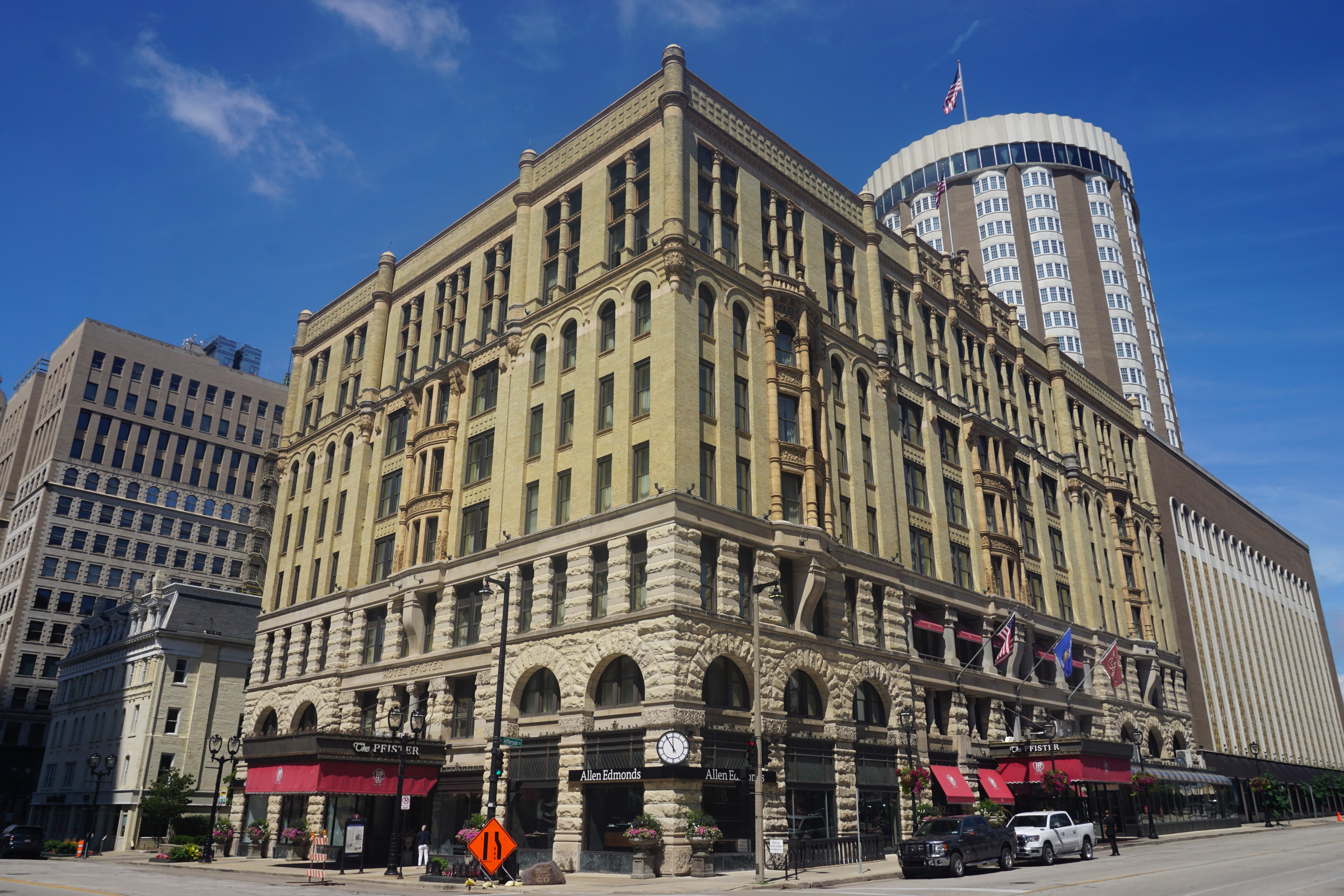
- The original Romanesque Revival building, with tower behind, in 2022

General information
- Status: Completed
- Type: Hotel
- Location: Milwaukee, United States
- Coordinates: 43.03922°N 87.90571°W
- Completed: 1893

Height
- Height: 250 ft (76 m)

Technical details
- Floor count: 23

Other information
- Public transit: MCTS; The Hop

Website
- www.thepfisterhotel.com

The Pfister Hotel is a luxury hotel in downtown Milwaukee, Wisconsin, United States. The Pfister Hotel is a member of Historic Hotels of America, the official program of the National Trust for Historic Preservation.

== History ==
Owned by Guido Pfister and his son, Charles F. Pfister, it was opened in 1893 at a cost of over $1 million ($35.8 million in 2025). Designed by architect Henry C. Koch in Romanesque Revival style, it had features uncommon in its time like fireproofing, electricity, and thermostat controls.

The hotel was purchased in 1962 by hospitality magnate Ben Marcus, who renovated the hotel and added a 23-story addition behind the building without compromising the original building itself, and continues to be owned by the Marcus Corporation. The Pfister Hotel has the largest hotel collection of Victorian art in the world. The hotel has held the AAA Four Diamond award since 1978.

It is listed on the National Register of Historic Places as part of the East Side Commercial Historic District.

The 1986 National Register nomination states:

The Pfister is the last nineteenth century grand hotel remaining in downtown Milwaukee. Local materials were used in its construction with rock-faced, Wauwatosa limestone for the first two floors and cream brick for the third through eighth floors. Indiana limestone and terra cotta were used as trim. Changes to the exterior include the removal of the massive stone portico on the Jefferson Street facade and the closing of an entrance at the southeast corner. The main lobby has been refurbished and restored to resemble its original appearance."

Some members of the Los Angeles Dodgers do not stay at the hotel with the rest of the team when they are in Milwaukee to play the Milwaukee Brewers, due to the legend the hotel is haunted. Some MLB players have claimed they have had paranormal experiences at the Pfister Hotel.

== Gallery ==
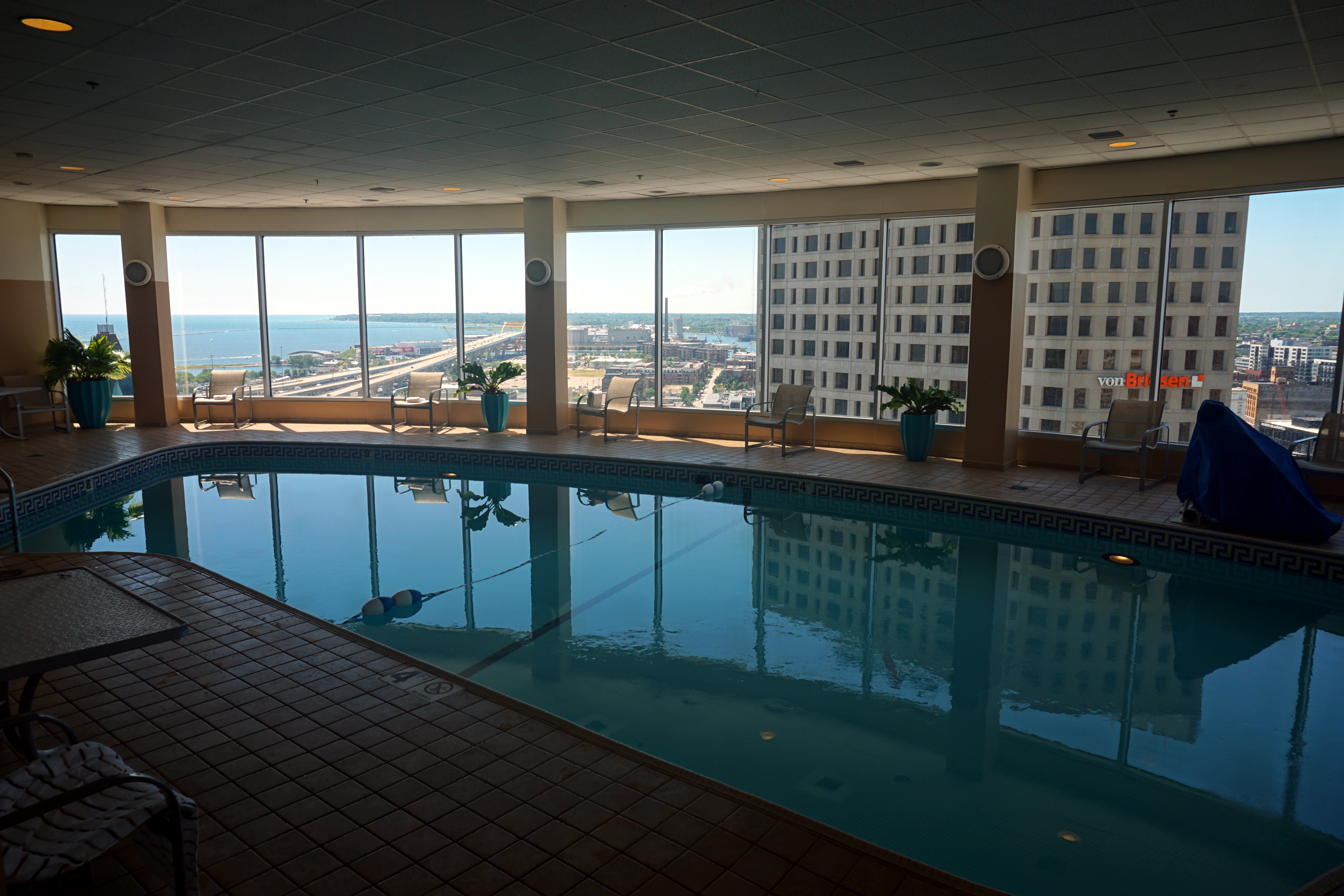
The pool at the top of the 1962 tower addition

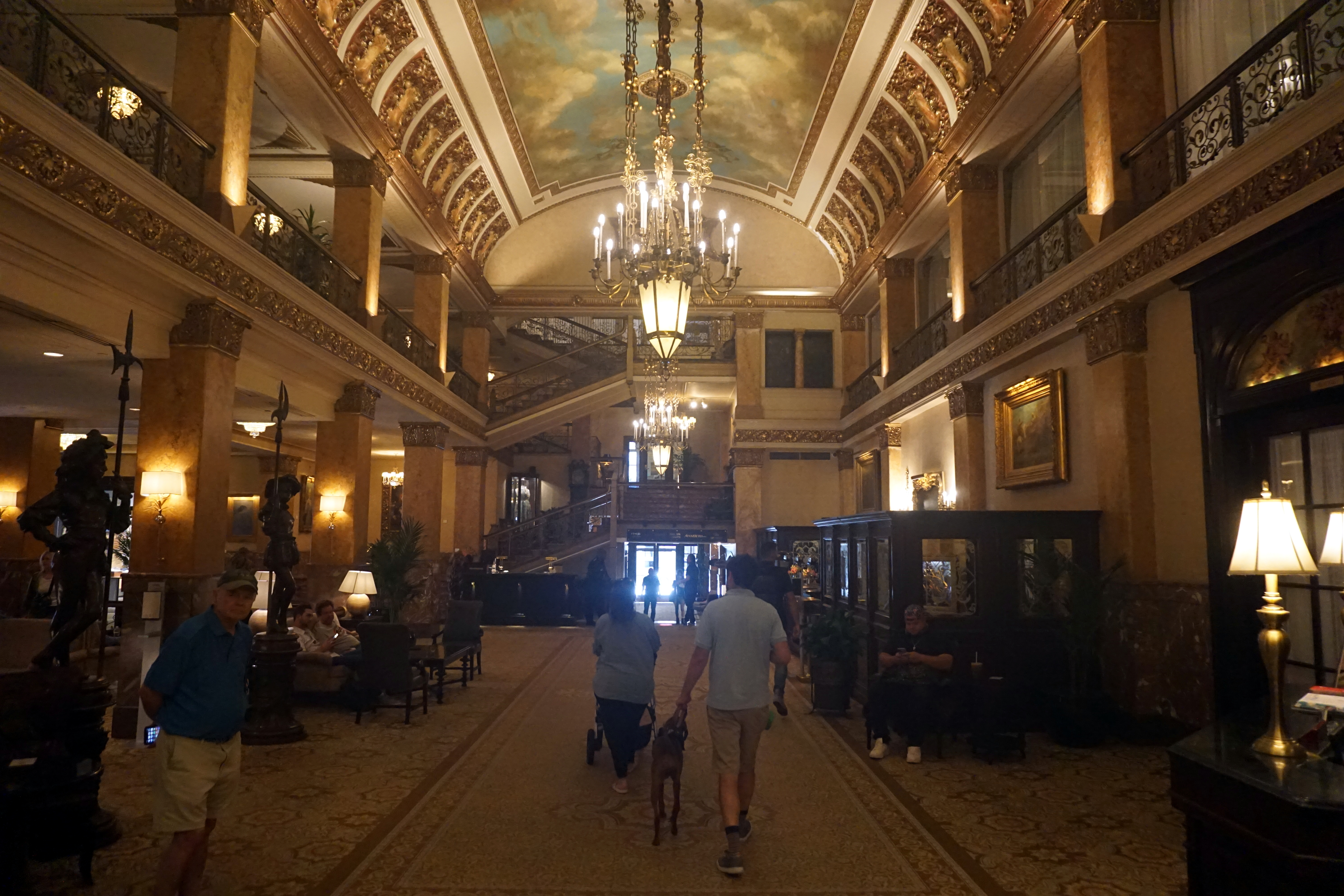
The lobby of the original building

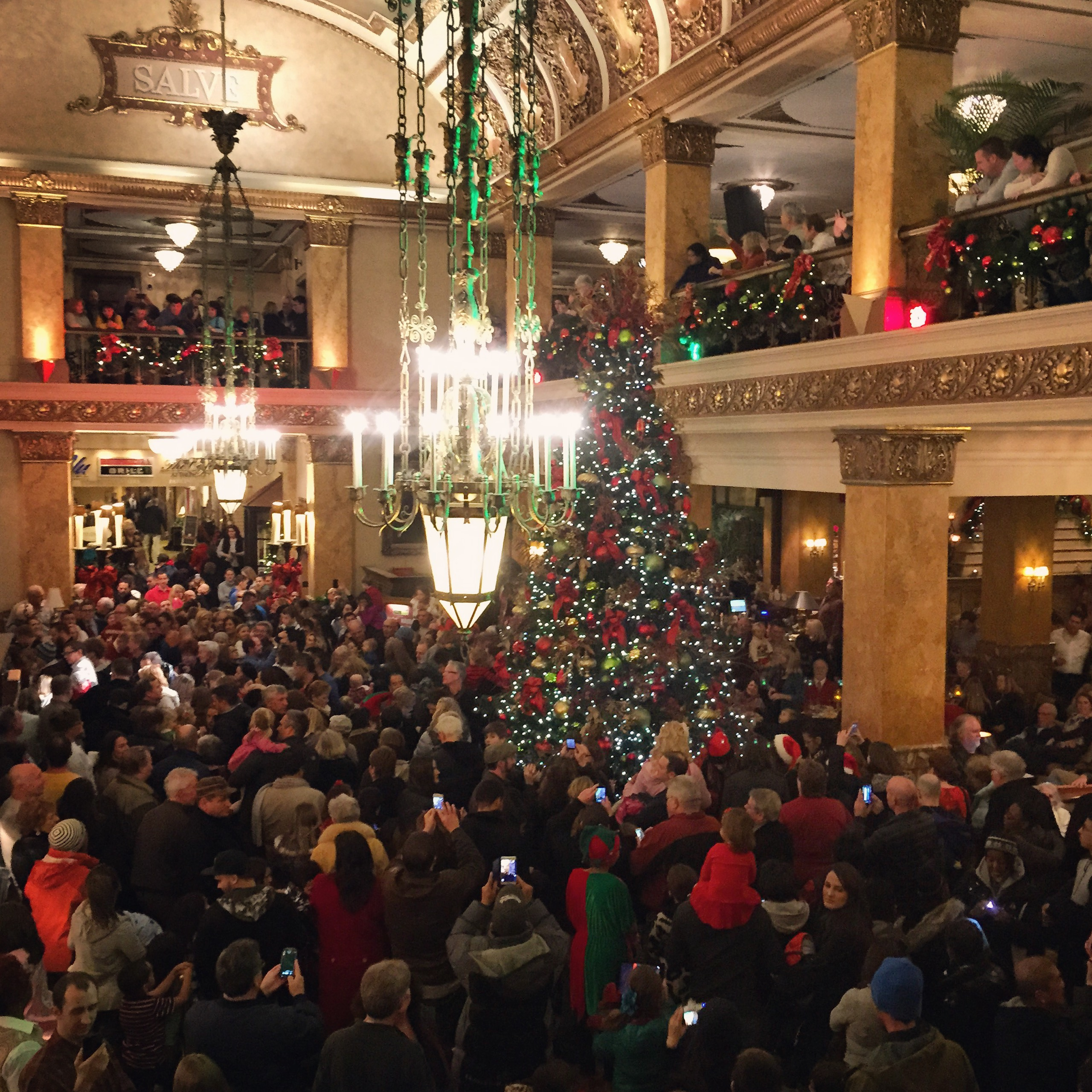
The lobby at Christmas

The hotel in 2024, photographed from across Jefferson Street. The 1964 addition is on the right. The original building is on the left. 411 East Wisconsin Center is behind the original building

== See also ==
- List of Historic Hotels of America
