= Landmark on the Lake =

Skyscraper in Milwaukee, Wisconsin

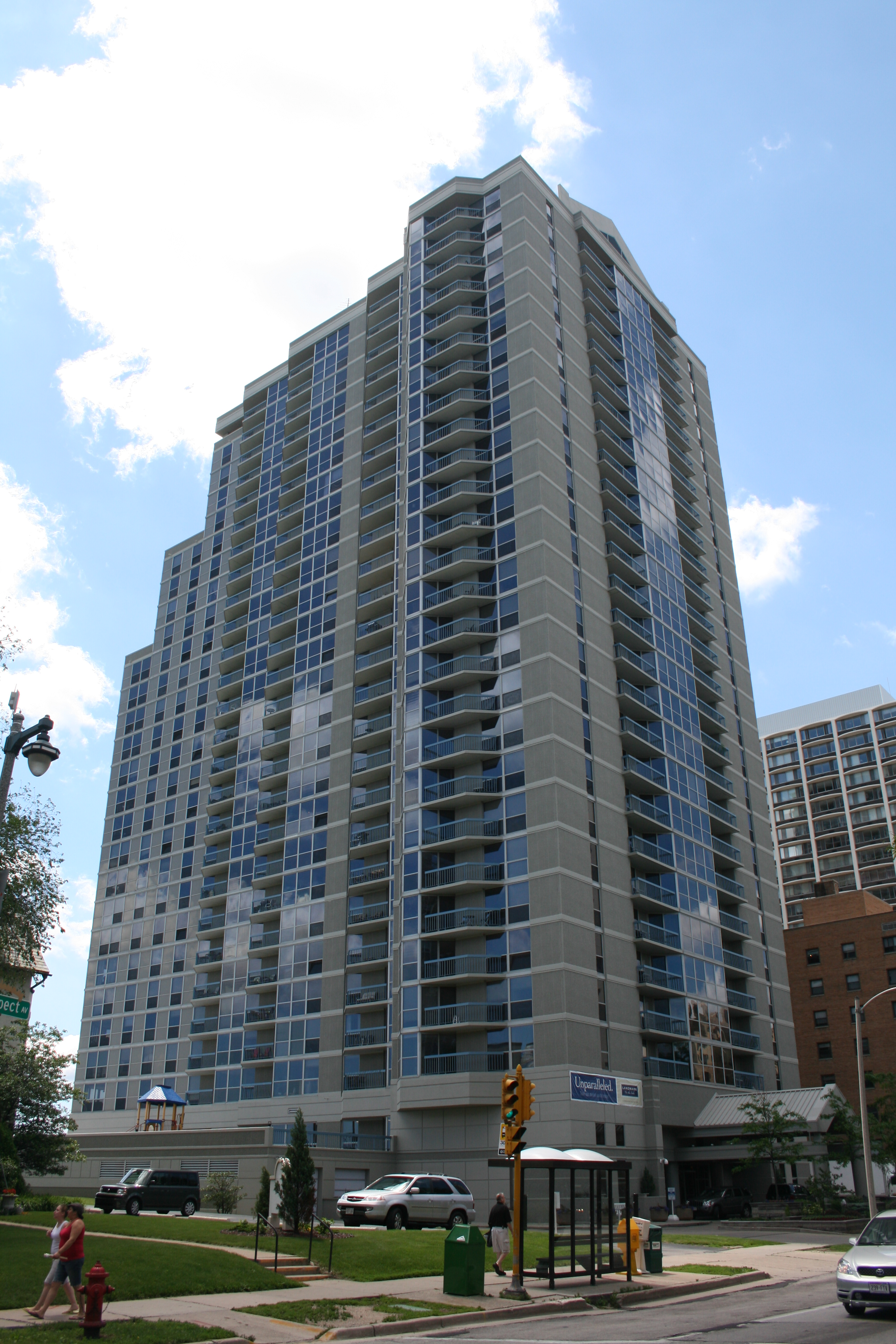
- Landmark on the Lake, Milwaukee

General information
- Status: Completed
- Architectural style: Modernism
- Classification: Residential
- Location: 1660 N Prospect Avenue, Milwaukee, Wisconsin
- Coordinates: 43.051729°N 87.891539°W
- Groundbreaking: 1989
- Opened: 1991
- Cost: $31 million

Height
- Height: 248 ft (76 m)

Technical details
- Material: Concrete
- Size: 275 condominiums
- Floor count: 28
- Lifts/elevators: 5

Design and construction
- Architect: James R. Loewenberg
- Architecture firm: Loewenberg and Fitch Architects
- Developer: Lincoln Landmark Ventures

Other information
- Parking: 433 spaces
- Public transit: MCTS

Landmark on the Lake is a high-rise residential condominium building on Prospect Avenue on the East Side of Milwaukee. Construction of the building began in 1989 and was completed in 1991. The building contains 275 condominiums on 27 floors. Landmark on the Lake is one of several large residential buildings on Prospect Avenue in Milwaukee. The building remains the tallest and most prominent on the East Side of Milwaukee at a height of 248 feet.

== History ==
Landmark on the Lake is one of several large apartment buildings constructed on Prospect Avenue between 1950 and 2010. Among them Prospect Tower, The Newport, Diamond Tower and 1522 On the Lake. The site was previously home to two older residential structures which were demolished and replaced with a parking lot. Property values on Prospect Avenue began to grow in the late 1980s and early 1990s with renovation efforts on nearby Brady Street. The growing appeal of real-estate on the East Side of Milwaukee ushered in a new era of residential development.

Landmark on the Lake was designed by the Chicago-based architectural firm Loewenberg and Fitch on behalf of the developer Lincoln Landmark Venture's. Construction was announced in 1989 and completed in 1991. The project replaced a vacant lot that was occasionally used for off-street parking. The building operated as rental apartments between its opening in 1991 and its conversion to condominium units in 2005. Former WTMJ news anchor Mike Jacobs is a resident of the building.

== Design ==
The 28 story building is 248 feet tall and contains 275 condominium units. The tower was built in a modernist style. This building is 248 feet tall from the front entrance, and 350 feet from the back facade. It sits on a steep bluff. Most units have floor to ceiling windows and balconies with views of the City of Milwaukee and neighboring Lake Michigan. The building contains an indoor pool, a workout room, a putting green, an enclosed parking garage and a two-story main lobby. The building is set on a bluff that overlooks Veterans Park and Lake Michigan.
