= 411 East Wisconsin Center =

Office building in Milwaukee, Wisconsin

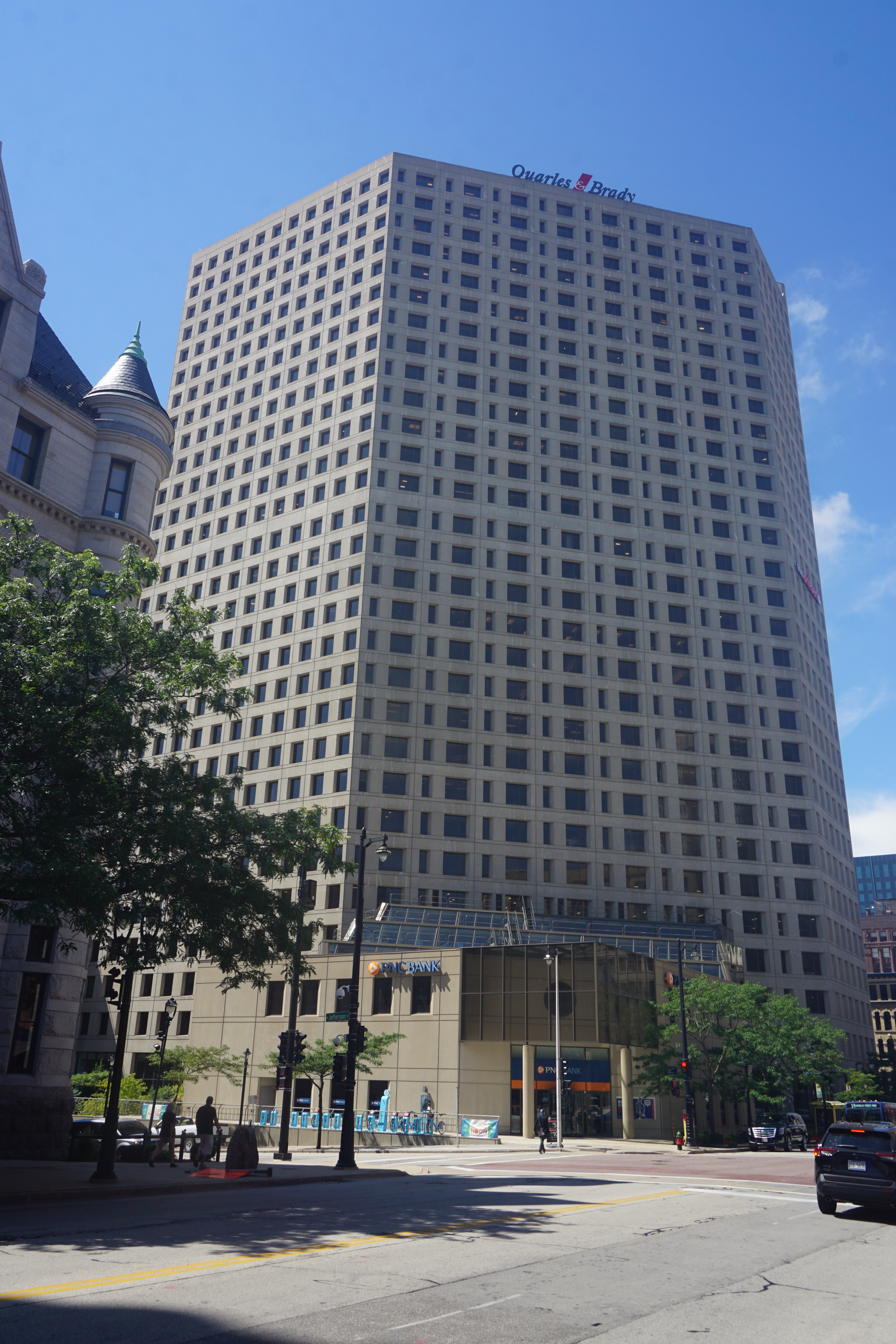
- 411 East Wisconsin Center from the east in 2022

General information
- Type: commercial office
- Location: 411 East Wisconsin Ave., Milwaukee, Wisconsin, United States
- Coordinates: 43.03816°N 87.905842°W
- Construction started: 1985
- Completed: 1985
- Opening: 1985
- Owner: Five Mile Capital Partners, Riverview Realty Partners
- Operator: Riverview Realty Partners

Height
- Roof: 124.36 m (408.0 ft)

Technical details
- Floor count: 30
- Floor area: 654,165 sq ft (60,773.9 m^{2})

Design and construction
- Architect: Harry Weese Associates

Other information
- Public transit: MCTS; The Hop

The 411 East Wisconsin Center is a high-rise located in Milwaukee, Wisconsin. Built in 1985 on the former site of the Goldsmith Building, it was designed by Chicago architect Harry Weese. It is the seventh tallest building in Milwaukee, and was the second tallest building in Milwaukee at the time of its completion, surpassed by the Milwaukee Center in 1988.

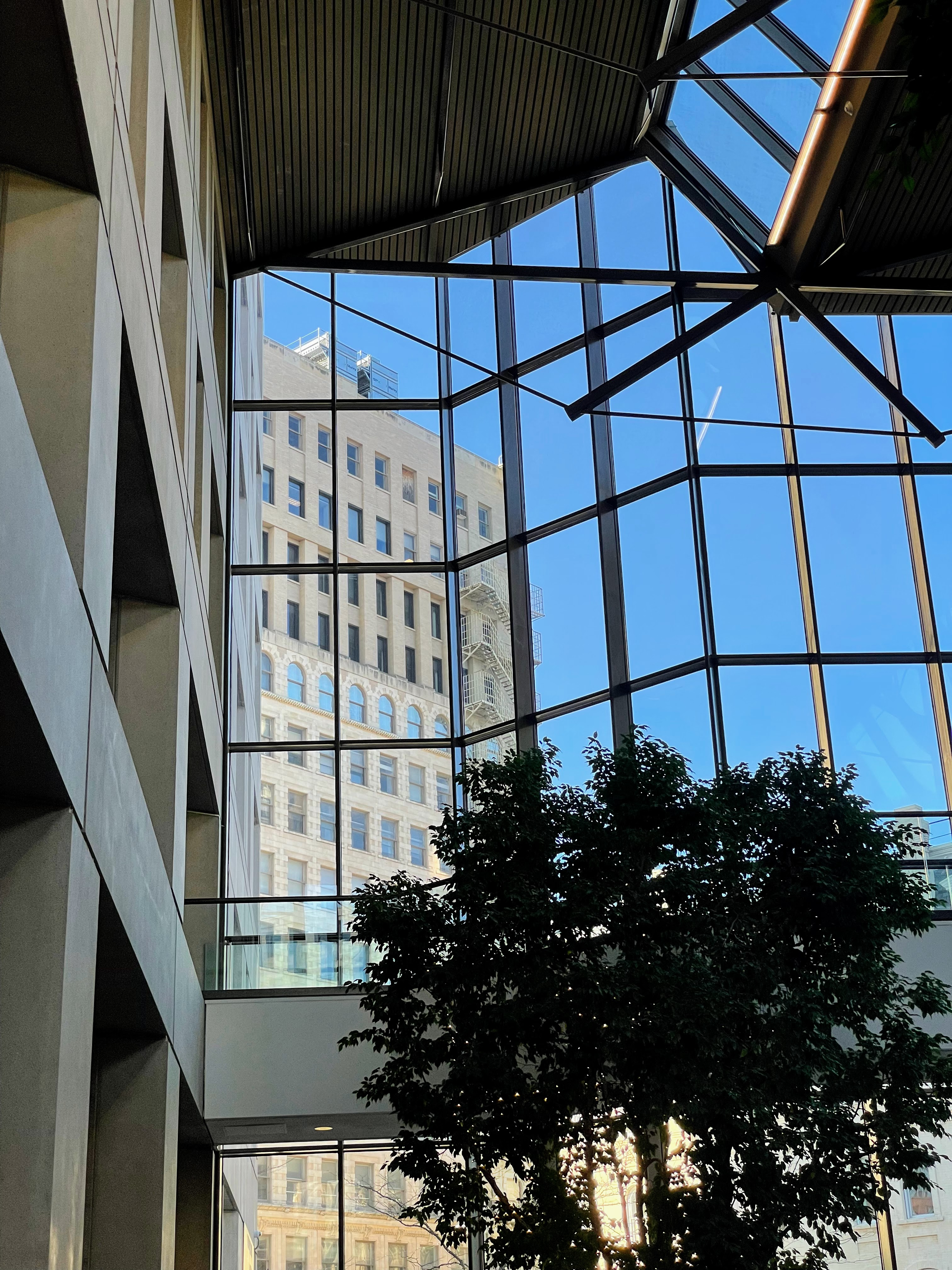
Lobby of the tower, facing north

The building has been home to the Quarles & Brady law firm since 1986 and the von Briesen & Roper law firm since 1985.

In 2005 the building was sold by TIAA-CREF to Triple Net Properties, a real estate company based in Santa Ana, California, for $95 million. It had an assessed value of $89.2 million in 2005.

In 2014, Riverview Realty Partners, an affiliate of Stamford-based Five Mile Capital Partners purchased the building for $74 million and Quarles & Brady extended their lease for another 10 years. Five Mile Capital Partners plans on undergoing $17.5 million in renovations to the building.

== See also ==
- List of tallest buildings in Milwaukee

Records
Preceded by Milwaukee City Hall	2nd Tallest building in Milwaukee; 1985—1988; 124m	Succeeded by Milwaukee Center
