= BMO Tower (Milwaukee) =

Office tower in Milwaukee, Wisconsin, United States

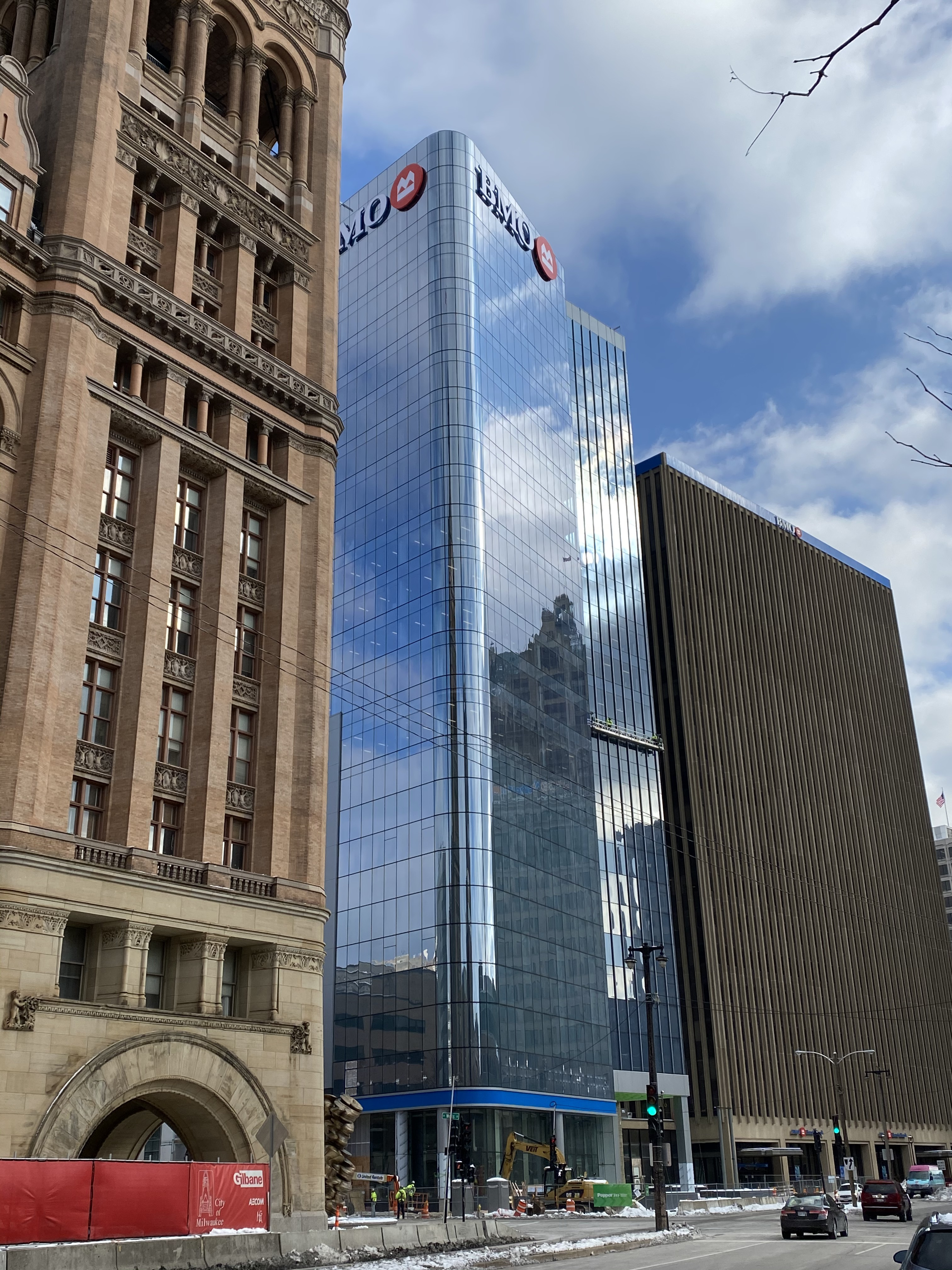
- Interactive map of the BMO Tower area
- Former names: BMO Harris Financial Center at Market Square

General information
- Status: Completed
- Type: High-rise building
- Location: Milwaukee, Wisconsin, 790 North Water Street
- Coordinates: 43°2′27.024″N 87°54′30.312″W
- Construction started: 2017
- Completed: December 2019
- Client: BMO Bank

Height
- Height: 328 feet (100 m)

Technical details
- Material: Glass and Steel
- Floor count: 25
- Floor area: 381,000 feet (116,000 m)

Design and construction
- Architect: Kahler Slater
- Developer: Irgens Development Partners

Other information
- Public transit access: MCTS; The Hop

Website
- www.bmotower.com

BMO Tower, also known as BMO Financial Center at Market Square, is a 25-story, 328-foot tower in Milwaukee, Wisconsin. The building was scheduled to be completed in December 2019, but construction delays postponed the opening until April 2020. The building is 281,000 square feet.

== History ==
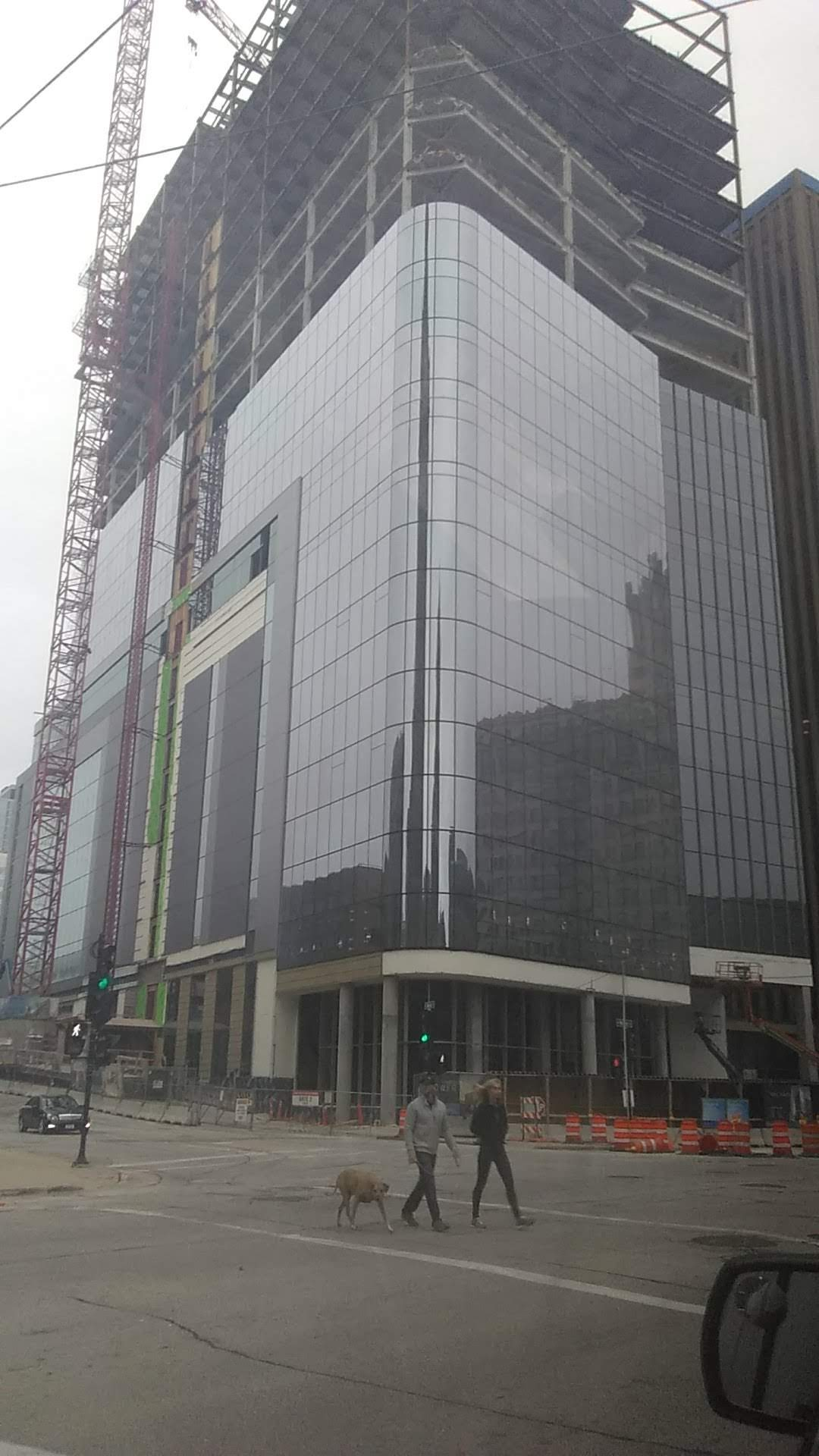
BMO Financial Center was under construction in June 2019.

The developer, Irgens Development Partners, purchased a 20-story building and a parking lot as the site for this high-rise. On November 17, 2017 demolition of the existing structures began. Construction began in December 2017. The total cost of the BMO project was $175 million. It is one of the tallest office towers in Milwaukee.

The construction encountered delays such as a water lateral break which flooded the lower floors of the building. In January 2020 The building's developer Irgens fired the general contractor J.H. Findorff & Son and hired another builder, Pepper Construction, to finish the building.

The BMO Financial Center was designed by Kahler Slater.

== Tenants ==
- BMO Bank
- Law firm Michael Best & Friedrich LLP - top three floors
- Heartland Advisors, Inc.
- Andrus Intellectual Property Law LLP
- Kahler Slater - 17th floor

== See also ==
- List of tallest buildings in Milwaukee
