= 333 Water =

Residential building in Milwaukee, Wisconsin

333 North Water
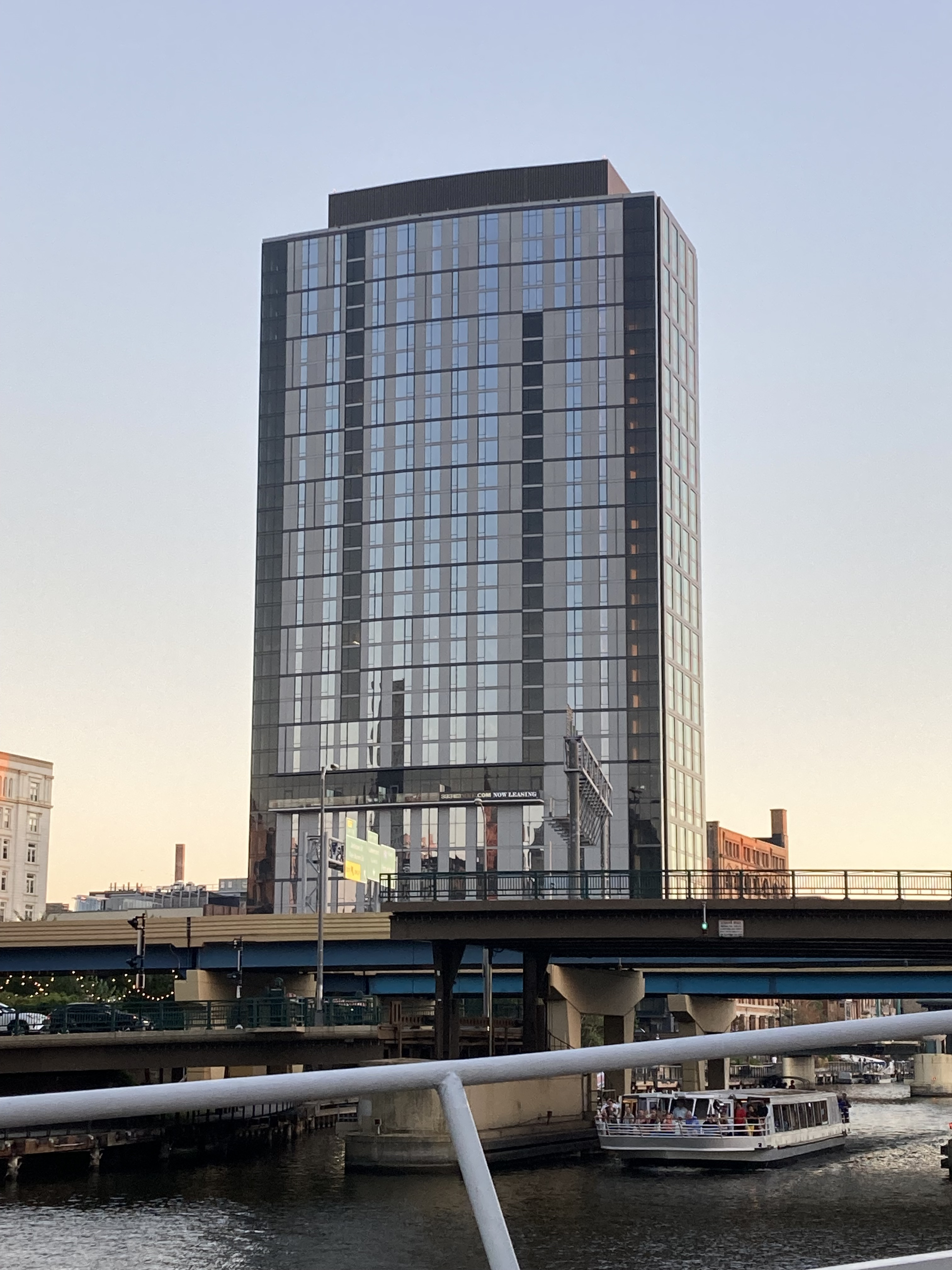
- 333 North Water in 2024
- Interactive map of the 333 North Water area

General information
- Status: Completed
- Type: Residential
- Location: 333 N. Water Street; Milwaukee, Wisconsin; United States
- Coordinates: 43°02′04″N 87°54′33″W
- Construction started: 2022
- Opening: 2024

Technical details
- Floor count: 31

Design and construction
- Architect: Solomon Cordwell Buenz
- Developer: Hines Interests Limited Partnership

Other information
- Public transit: MCTS; The Hop

Website
- www.scb.com/project/333-north-water-street/

333 Water is a high-rise apartment building in the Third Ward neighborhood of Milwaukee, Wisconsin. The 342-foot, 31-story high-rise is the state of Wisconsin's sixth tallest residential building, and it features 333 high-end apartments, 10,000 square feet of restaurant and retail space, and an adjoining 7-story parking structure with hundreds of parking spaces.

== History ==
On May 19, 2021, the developer, Hines Interests Limited Partnership, announced its intention to develop a residential apartment tower in the Historic Third Ward that would rise 32 stories (365 feet) and contain 295 units, becoming the tallest building in the neighborhood. On June 16, 2021, the project was approved by the Historic Third Ward Architectural Review Board. The developer spent 2021 and most of 2022 securing permits and finalizing design before completing the site purchase for $6 million in June 2022.

== Construction ==
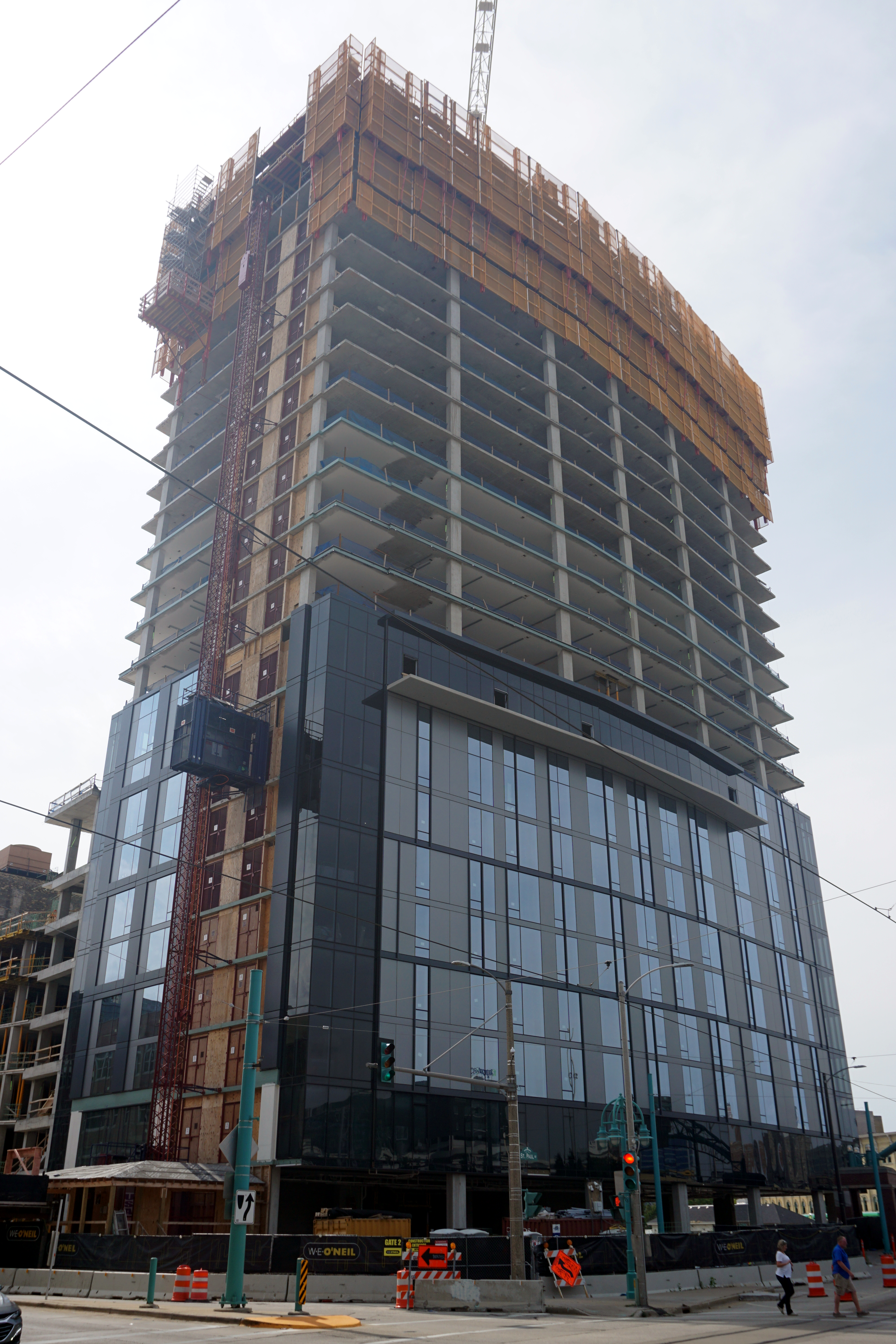
333 North Water under construction in September 2023

Construction on the tower began in September 2022 with expected completion in 2024. Chicago based Solomon Cordwell Buenz is serving as the lead architect for the project with Chicago-based W.E. O'Neil Construction serving as the General Contractor. As part of the project, the city of Milwaukee created a $903,000 in tax incremental finance assistance for a 210-linear foot connection to the Milwaukee Riverwalk system.
