= Pabst Building =

Office building in Milwaukee, Wisconsin

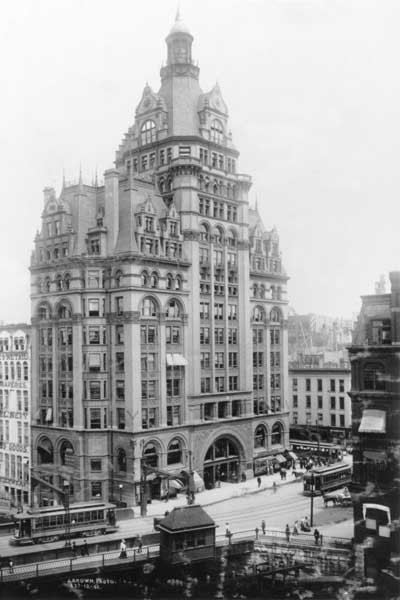
- Interactive map of the Pabst Building area

General information
- Status: Demolished
- Type: Commercial office
- Architectural style: Flemish Renaissance Revival
- Location: 108 East Wisconsin Avenue, Milwaukee, Wisconsin, United States
- Coordinates: 43°02′20″N 87°54′34″W
- Completed: 1891
- Demolished: 1981

Height
- Height: 235 ft (72 m)

Technical details
- Structural system: Steel frame
- Floor count: 14
- Lifts/elevators: 3

Design and construction
- Architecture firm: Solon Spencer Beman

The Pabst Building was a 14-story neo-gothic high-rise building in Milwaukee, Wisconsin. Built in 1891, it was Milwaukee's first skyscraper, and was the tallest building in Milwaukee until the Milwaukee City Hall was finished four years later. The Pabst Building was demolished in 1981 and the 100 East Wisconsin Building now occupies its site. Having stood at 235-foot (72 m) tall, the Pabst Building is the second tallest building ever demolished in Wisconsin.

== History and description ==
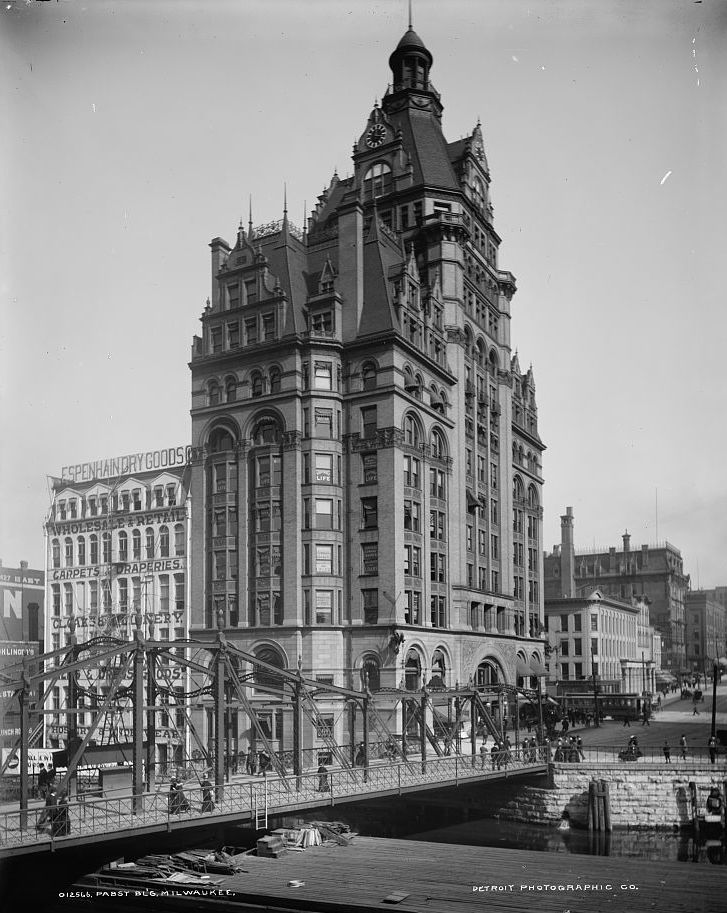
Pabst Building ca 1900

The property at the northwest corner of Water and Wisconsin Street was a prime central location of historic significance. Solomon Juneau's original cabin and trading post had stood at this spot on the Milwaukee River, considered the "starting point" of the city. In 1851 the Ludington Block building was built here. Around 1890 the property was purchased by brewer Frederick Pabst, who demolished the Ludington building and hired architect Solon Spencer Beman to design his headquarters, a magnificent symbol of his brewery empire, in its place.

The Pabst Building measured fourteen stories, about 235 feet tall from the sidewalk to the top of the copper tower. It was constructed of brown brick ornamented with terra cotta with a magnificent granite arch at its entrance. The main tower was topped with copper, featuring four large clock faces. The style has been described as "a masterpiece of Romanesque Revival" and as a "neo-gothic high-rise, with Flemish detailing." It quickly became an iconic building of Milwaukee and a popular subject for postcards. The Pabst was Milwaukee's first skyscraper, and held the title of tallest building in Milwaukee for four years, until the Milwaukee City Hall was completed.

The Pabst Building saw many alterations to its roofline over the years. In the late 1940s the copper towers were removed due to deterioration and the rooflines were squared off. In 1981 it was demolished to make way for 100 East Wisconsin. The crown of the new building was inspired by the Pabst Building's design. Demolition of the building began in late 1980, and its archway fell on April 1, 1981.

Records
Preceded by Unknown	Tallest Building in Wisconsin; 1891—1895; 72m	Succeeded by Milwaukee City Hall
Preceded by Unknown	2nd Tallest building in Milwaukee; 1895—1927; 72m	Succeeded by Hilton Milwaukee City Center
