= Associated Bank River Center =

Office building in Milwaukee, Wisconsin

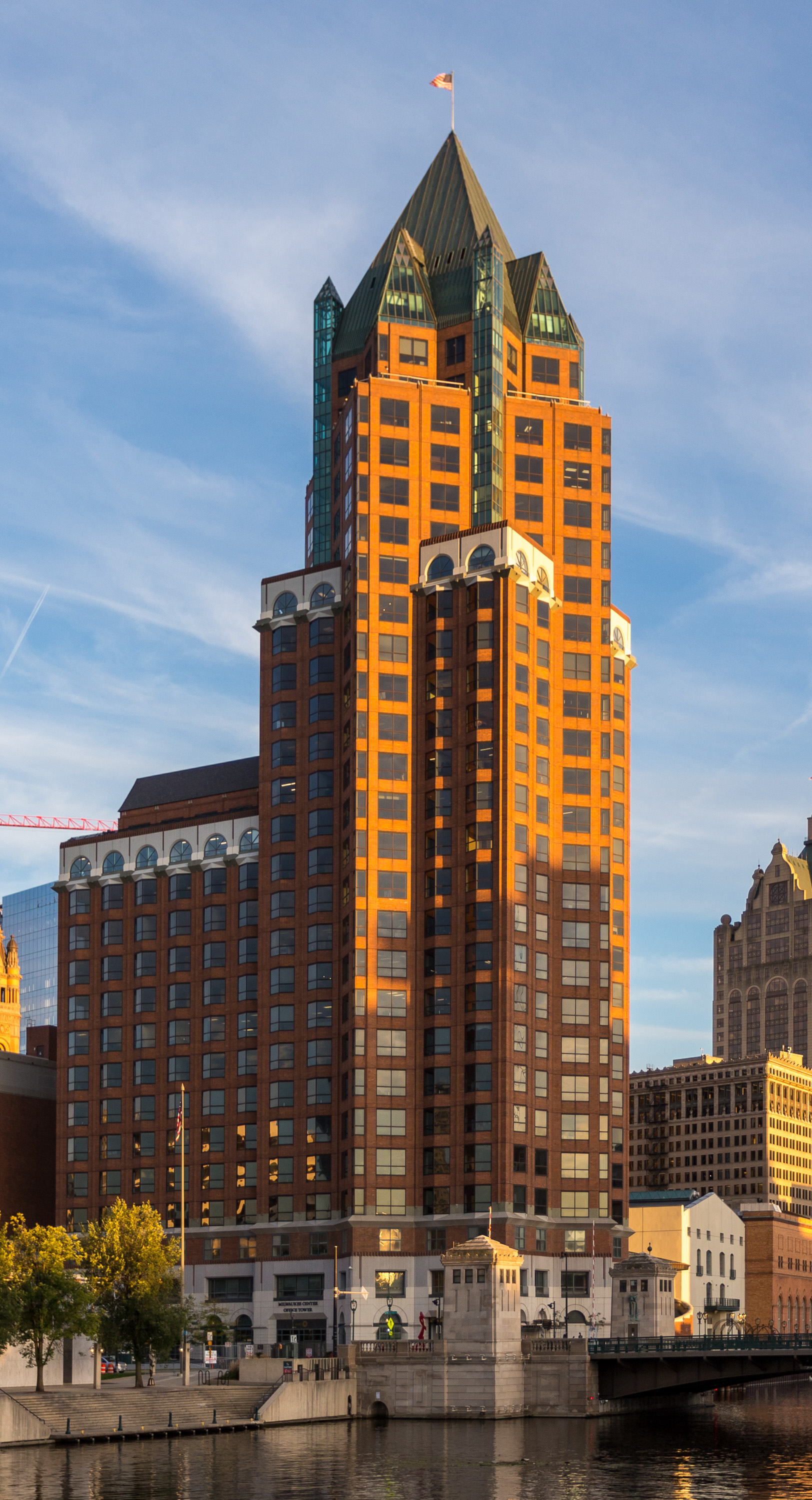

- Location within Wisconsin
- Former names: Milwaukee Center

General information
- Status: Completed
- Type: Commercial office
- Architectural style: postmodern
- Location: Milwaukee, Wisconsin, United States, 111 East Kilbourn Avenue
- Coordinates: 43°02′30″N 87°54′42″W
- Completed: 1988
- Owner: Associated Bank

Height
- Height: 426 ft (130 m)

Technical details
- Floor count: 28
- Lifts/elevators: 6

Design and construction
- Architecture firm: Skidmore, Owings & Merrill

Other information
- Public transit: MCTS; The Hop

The Associated Bank River Center is a 28-story, 426-foot-tall (130 m) postmodern high-rise building in Milwaukee, Wisconsin. The building, originally named the Milwaukee Center, was completed in 1988, during a small building boom in Milwaukee that also included 100 East Wisconsin. Until 100 East was completed, the Milwaukee Center was the second tallest building in Milwaukee. The peaked tower, red brick, and the use of green near the top pay homage to the style of the Milwaukee City Hall. The building is primarily used for offices, but has parking as well.

The Milwaukee Center's construction was spurred by the Milwaukee Repertory Theater's purchase and subsequent selling of the land surrounding the former Wisconsin Electric Powerhouse which was converted into The Rep's primary performance venue, the Quadracci Powerhouse. The Milwaukee Center's rotunda connects the office tower with the Saint Kate hotel and the historic Pabst Theater. In March 2016, Associated Bank announced it was acquiring the Milwaukee Center and on December 9, 2019 they announced the name change to the Associated Bank River Center.

== See also ==
- List of tallest buildings in Milwaukee

Records
| Preceded by 411 East Wisconsin Center | 2nd Tallest building in Milwaukee; 1988—1989; 130m | Succeeded by 100 East Wisconsin |
