= The Moderne =

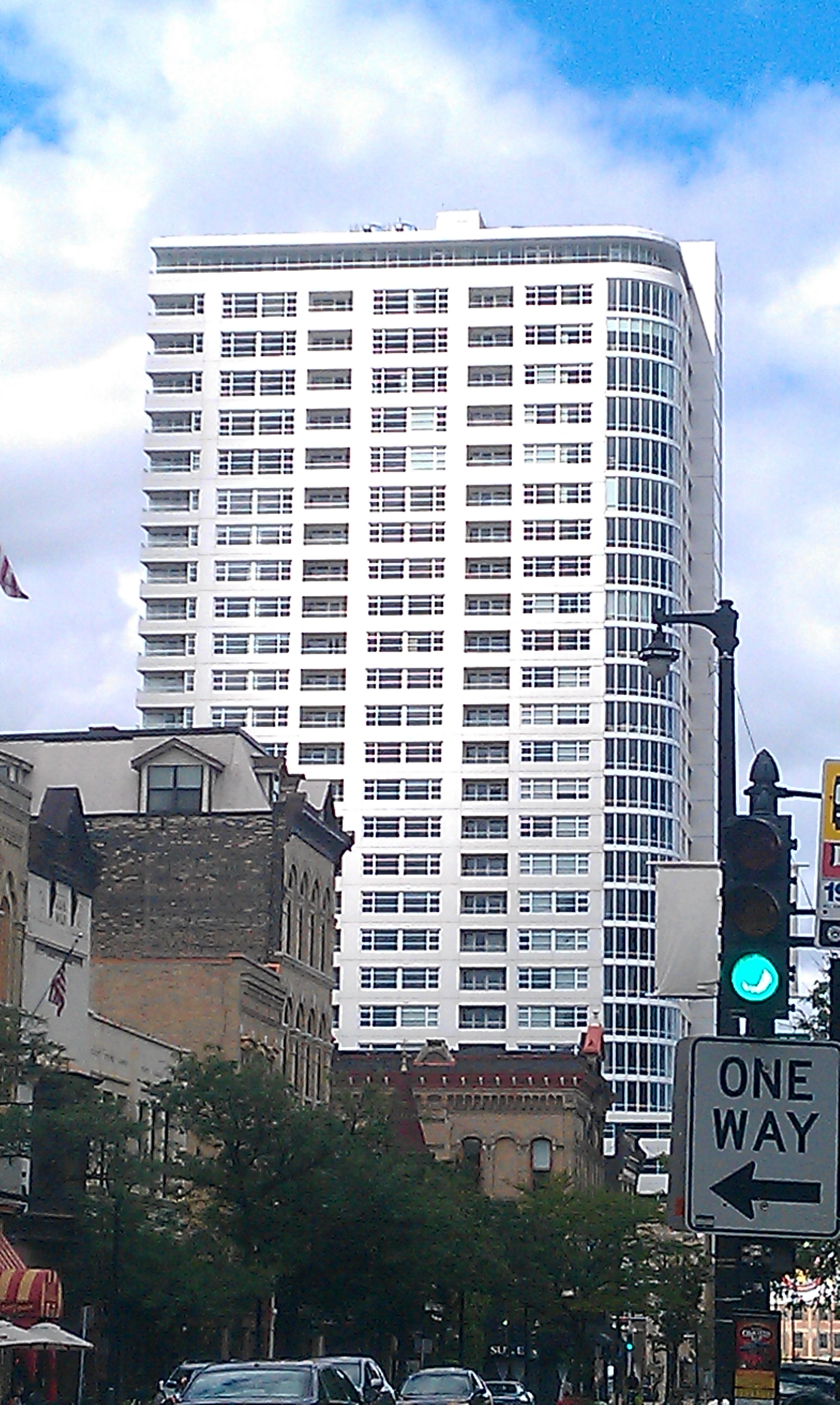
- From the south in September 2013
- Interactive map of the The Moderne area

General information
- Status: Completed
- Type: Residential, retail
- Architectural style: Postmodern
- Location: 1141 North Old World Third Street; Milwaukee, Wisconsin 53203; United States
- Coordinates: 43°02′43″N 87°54′53″W
- Groundbreaking: February 24, 2011
- Completed: 2013
- Cost: $55.2 million
- Landlord: Siegel‑Gallagher

Height
- Height: 348 ft (106 m)

Technical details
- Floor count: 30

Design and construction
- Architecture firm: RINKA
- Developer: Barrett Lo Visionary Development
- Main contractor: J. H. Findorff & Son, Inc.

Other information
- Parking: 204 above-ground spaces
- Public transit: MCTS

Website
- themoderne.net

The Moderne (/moʊˈdɛərn/ moh-DAIRN) is a 30-story apartment building in Milwaukee. It stands at 348 feet (106 meters) tall, making it the tallest building in the city west of the Milwaukee River. The tower's ground floor is occupied by Carson's Ribs, with the remaining floors used for apartments, condominiums, and parking.

== History ==
The building was started in 2011 during the Great Recession following the securing of loans from the City of Milwaukee and the United States Department of Housing and Urban Development. The Moderne remains the tallest building to have ever been constructed west of the Milwaukee River in the State of Wisconsin.

== Design and construction ==
The Moderne was developed by Barrett Lo Visionary Development with RINKA serving as lead architect and J.H. Findorff as the general contractor. Construction began in 2011 and finished in 2013. The tower is located in the Westown neighborhood of Milwaukee, Wisconsin. Due to its proximity to the now demolished Bradley Center and new Fiserv Forum, the building has been home to several members of the Milwaukee Bucks.

== See also ==
- List of tallest buildings in Milwaukee
