= Sandburg Halls =

Skyscraper in Milwaukee, Wisconsin

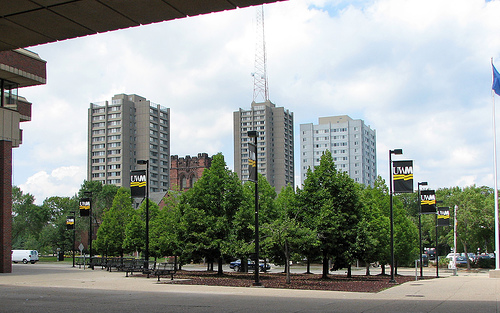
- Sandburg Residence Halls, University of Wisconsin–Milwaukee
- Interactive map of the Sandburg Halls area

General information
- Location: 3400 N Maryland Ave, Milwaukee, Wisconsin
- Coordinates: 43.078344°N 87.8817879°W

Technical details
- Floor count: West Tower 16 floors South Tower 20 floors North Tower 26 floors East Tower 17 floors
- Lifts/elevators: Approx. 13 (public access)

Other information
- Parking: 2 levels underneath Sandburg towers.
- Public transit: MCTS

Sandburg Residence Hall is a student residence hall on Maryland Ave, Milwaukee, Wisconsin on the campus of University of Wisconsin–Milwaukee. The building consists of four high rise towers and is the largest student residence hall of the school with 2,700-student housing capacity. The north and west towers were erected in 1971, the south tower in 1973 and the east tower in 2001. The four towers are connected with a 2-floor Sandburg Commons. The University Housing offices reside inside. The tallest of the buildings, the north tower, reaches 242 ft (74.0 m) tall (building), and up to 481 ft (146.8m) tall (including the antenna on the roof) (antenna has since been removed as of 2024). Sandburg Halls is named for the American writer and poet Carl Sandburg. There is a plaque outside the building explaining Sandburg's role as an organizer for the Social Democratic Party, and as personal secretary to Emil Seidel, Milwaukee's first Socialist mayor.

North, South and West Towers are identical in suite and room layout. They differ only in number of floors which are 26, 20 and 16 respectively. On floors 1-4 of all 3 towers, the configuration of the 10 and 20 suite may vary due to the connection to the commons. Every floor contains eight suites.

East Tower which is 17 stories tall contains six apartment-style suites per floor.
