= Wisconsin Gas Building =

Skyscraper in Milwaukee, Wisconsin

Coordinates: 43°02′22″N 87°54′11″W

Wisconsin Gas Building

The Wisconsin Gas Building (originally Milwaukee Gas Light Building) is a classic stepped Art Deco tower located in downtown Milwaukee, Wisconsin at 626 East Wisconsin Avenue. It was designed by architects Eschweiler & Eschweiler and completed in 1930 using differing materials on the exterior to graduate from dark to light.

== Description ==
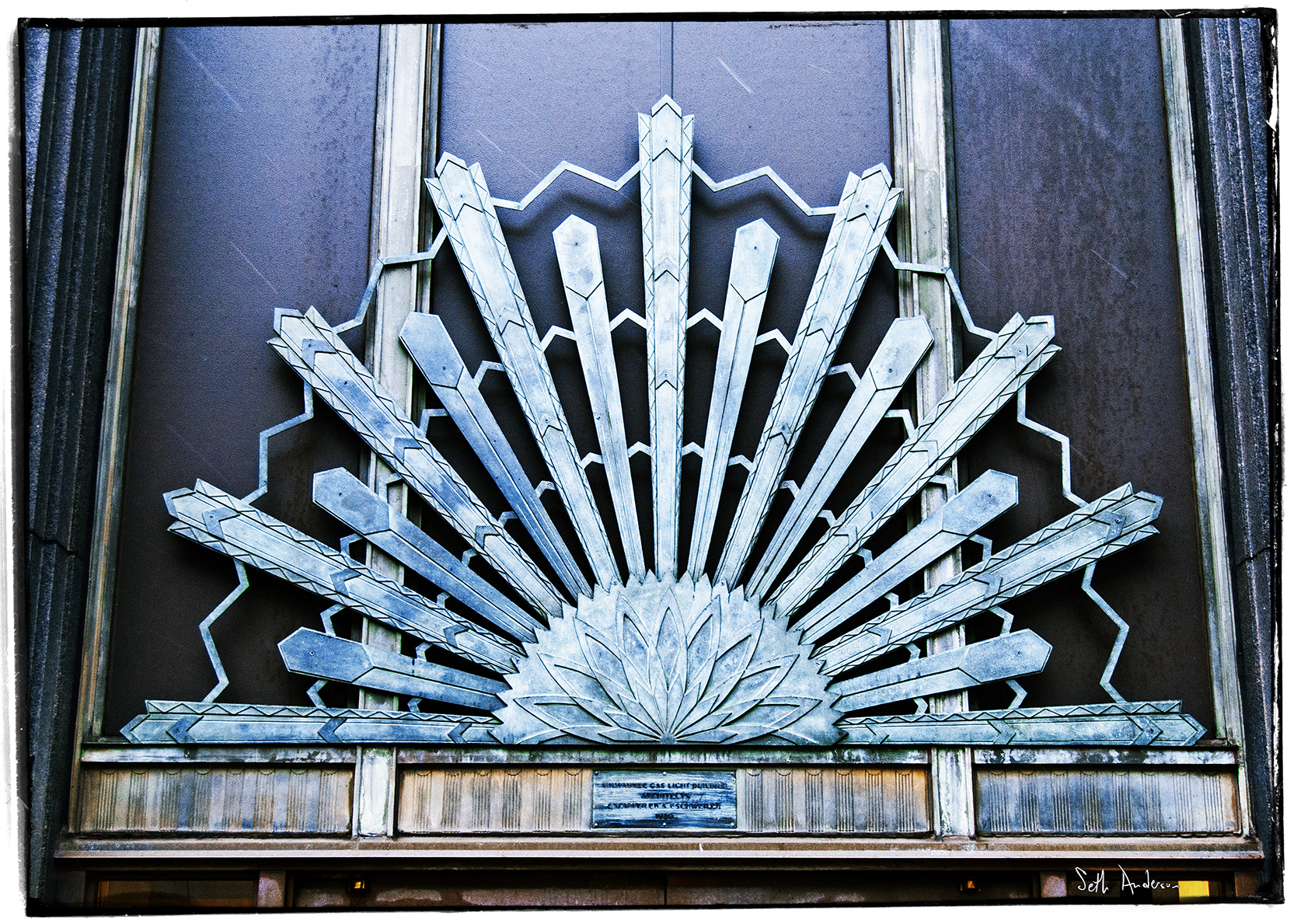
Art-deco architectural details from the 1930 Milwaukee Gas Light Building

Locally distinct light colored brick called Cream City brick crowns the high-rise. Copper panels adorn the spandrels, while organic foliage patterns and terracotta designs decorate the façade. The building stands 250 feet tall and has 20 floors. Demolished to make room for the building in 1930, a Prohibition-era speakeasy was formerly on the site.

Wisconsin Gas was purchased by Wisconsin Energy in 2001. During the consolidation of Wisconsin Gas into Wisconsin Energy's neighboring downtown corporate headquarters, the Wisconsin Gas Building was sold to a developer in 2004 who converted it into leased office space.

In 2025, the Wisconsin Gas Building went into foreclosure.

== Weather flame ==
A weather beacon shaped as a natural gas flame was added to the top of the Wisconsin Gas Building in 1956. It indicates the weather forecast by its color and flicker. The flame was turned off in 1973 because of that year's energy crisis. It was turned on again in 1985. The flame stands 21 feet tall and weighs four tons. In 2013, the neon tube lighting system was replaced with an LED lighting system. The new LED system allows millions of colors and various other lighting schemes outside the traditional red-gold-blue system, including charity efforts and sports team colors.

There is a rhyme created to help remember the colors. Most of the rhyme is consistent, with variations in the final line:

When the flame is red, it's warm weather ahead.
When the flame is gold, watch out for cold.
When the flame is blue, there's no change in view.
When there's a flickering flame, expect snow or rain!

and

When the flame is red, warm weather is ahead.
When the flame is gold, watch out for cold.
When the flame is blue, there's no change in view.
Where there's agitation, expect precipitation.

The light has been used as a harbor marker and navigation aid by mariners in Lake Michigan over the years.
