= List of tallest buildings in Wisconsin =

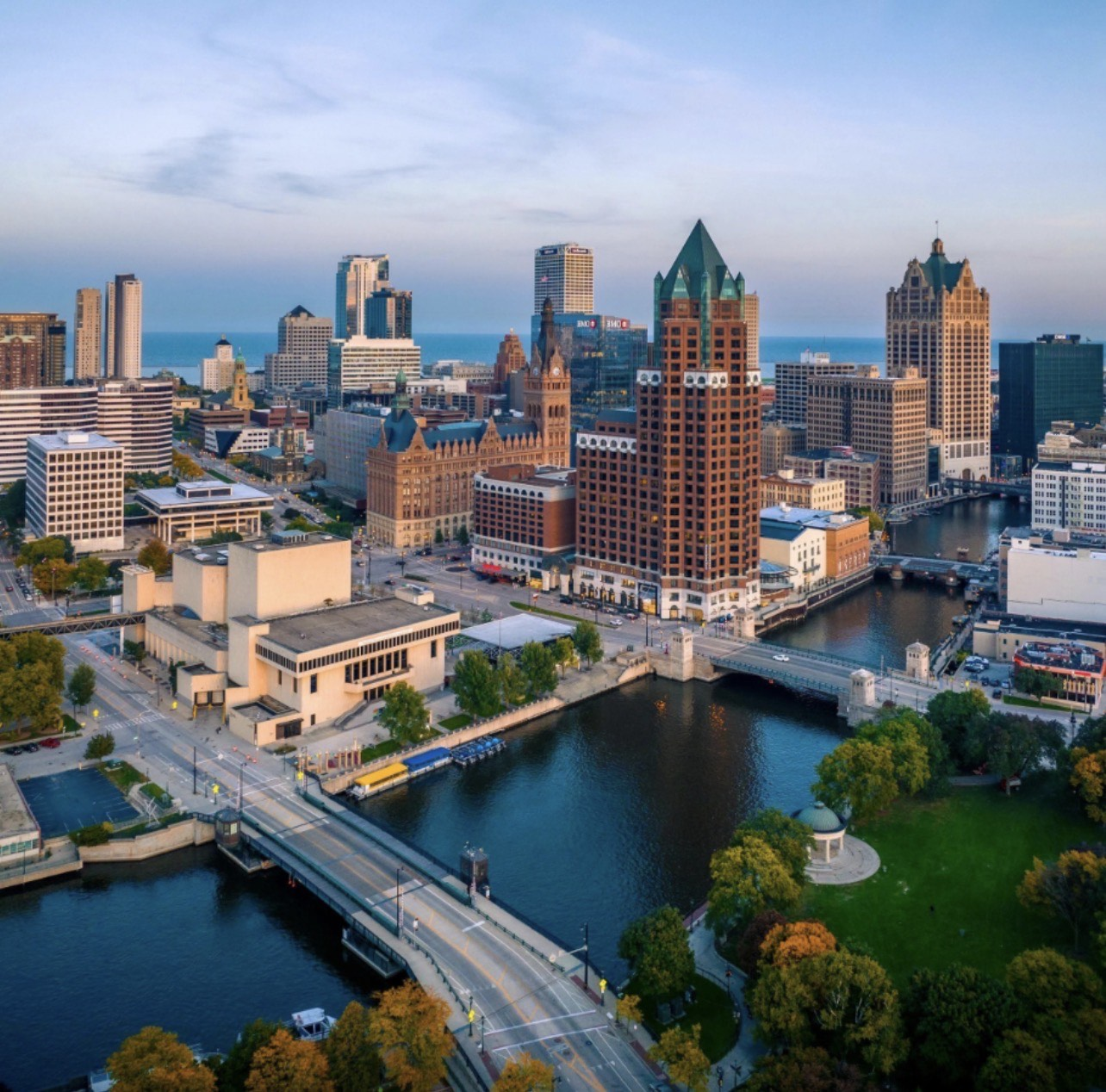
Milwaukee's Skyline as viewed from North West. The Milwaukee River is pictured in the bottom of the image. Notable buildings on this list are also pictured. From left to right: Ascent MKE, Kilbourn Tower, University Club Tower (Milwaukee), North Western Mutual North Tower, Northwestern Mutual Tower and Commons, 7Seventy7, Milwaukee City Hall, U.S. Bank Center (Milwaukee), BMO Harris Bank Building, Associated Bank River Center, 100 East Wisconsin and Chase Tower (Milwaukee).

This list of tallest buildings in Wisconsin ranks skyscrapers in the U.S. state of Wisconsin by height. The tallest 17 buildings in Wisconsin are located in Milwaukee. The tallest is the U.S. Bank Center (Milwaukee), followed by Northwestern Mutual Tower and Commons. The Couture in Milwaukee was recently completed but did not eclipse the height of the U.S. Bank Center - which is still the tallest building in the state.

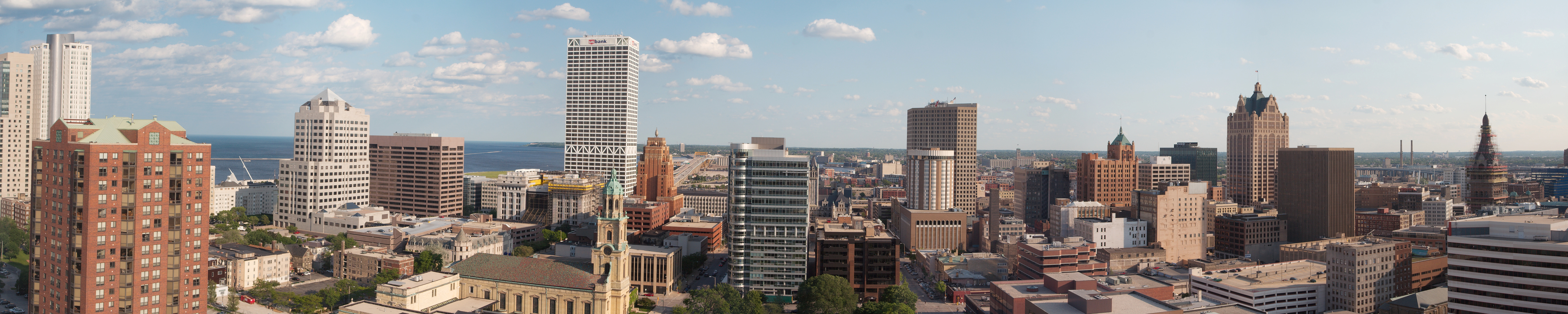
A 2008 view of downtown Milwaukee from E. State St., with the Yankee Hill Apartments near left, the Cathedral of St. John the Evangelist near left-center, The Pfister Hotel at right-center, and the scaffolded Milwaukee City Hall at the far right. Seven of the buildings listed below are not pictured, including the Northwestern Mutual Tower and Commons, which had yet to be built.

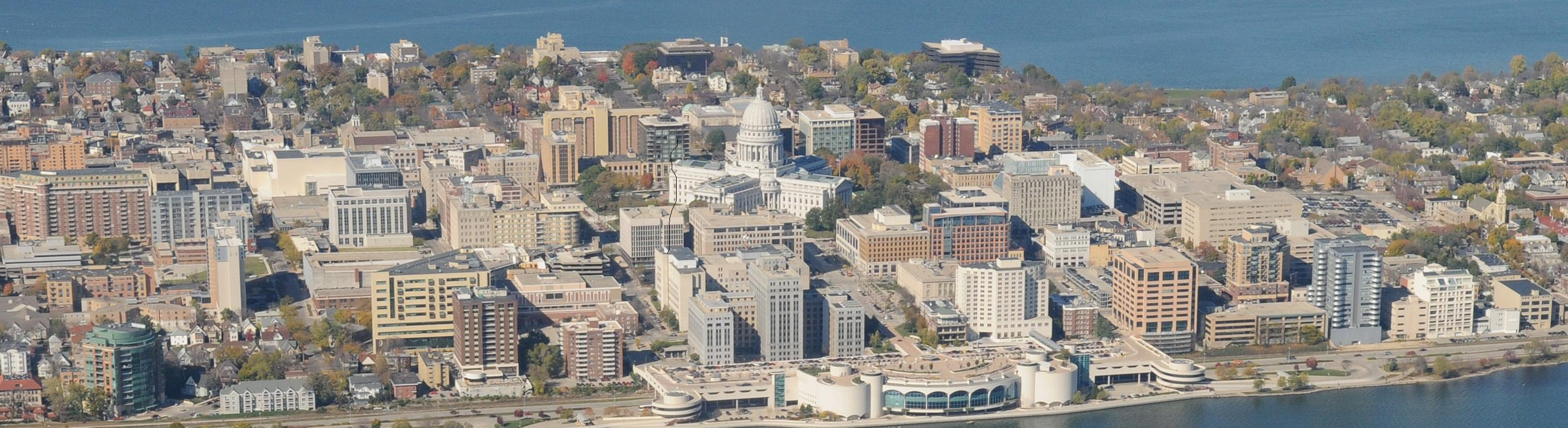
Aerial view of downtown Madison

== Tallest buildings ==
This list contains buildings in Wisconsin with a height of 280 feet (85m) or more. Of the 21 buildings, 20 are located in Milwaukee and 1 in Madison. The following list includes the rank of the building, name of the building, city the building is in, image of the building, height of the building in feet and meters, how many floors the building has, the year the building was made in, and notes.

A notable building that is not included in this list is Dudley Tower, in Wausau, WI. Standing at a height of 241 feet, it is the tallest commercial building in Wisconsin outside of Milwaukee.

Rank	Name	Image	Height ft (m)	Floors	Year	City	Notes
1	U.S. Bank Center		601 ft (183m)	42	1973	Milwaukee	Tallest building in the state; previously called the First Wisconsin Center (1973–92) and the Firstar Center (1992–2002). The building won a Distinguished Building Award from the Chicago Chapter of the American Institute of Architects in 1974.
2	Northwestern Mutual Tower and Commons		554 ft (169m)	32	2017	Milwaukee	Largest office building in Wisconsin; building mostly made out of glass. Building is located a block east across Wisconsin Ave. from the U.S. Bank Center.
3	100 East Wisconsin		549 ft (167m)	37	1989	Milwaukee	Designed as a postmodern version of old German vernacular architecture; built on the site of the former 14-story Pabst skyscraper.
4	The Couture		507 ft (155 m)	44	2024	Milwaukee	Tallest residential building in the state of Wisconsin.
5	University Club Tower		446 ft (136m)	36	2007	Milwaukee	Tallest building constructed in the state in the 21st century, until the Northwestern Mutual Tower.
6	Milwaukee Center		426 ft (130m)	28	1988	Milwaukee	Second tallest building in Milwaukee at the time it was completed.
7	411 East Wisconsin Center		408 ft (124m)	30	1985	Milwaukee	Constructed with 1,200 eight-ton pre-cast concrete panels in a modern architectural style.
8	Northwestern Mutual North Tower		395 ft (120m)	19	1990	Milwaukee	The light blue pyramid at the top is lit at night.
9	7Seventy7	7Seventy7 Building	387 ft (118m)	34	2018	Milwaukee	The residential tower includes 310 apartments, parking, retail, and a public plaza.
10	Kilbourn Tower		380 ft (116m)	33	2005	Milwaukee	
11	Milwaukee City Hall		353 ft (108m)	15	1895	Milwaukee	Tallest habitable building in the world for more than four years after completion (1895–99); tallest building in Milwaukee for nearly 80 years.
12	The Moderne		348 ft (106m)	31	2012	Milwaukee	Tallest building in Wisconsin west of the Milwaukee River.
13	333 North Water		342 ft (104 m)	31	2024	Milwaukee	The residential tower boasts the highest rents in Milwaukee on a per-square-foot basis.
14	BMO Harris Financial Center	New BMO Tower 790 N Water St, Milwaukee, WI 53202	335 ft (102m)	25	2020	Milwaukee	
15	AT&T Center (Milwaukee)		313 ft (95m)	19	1924	Milwaukee	Designed by Eschweiler & Eschweiler, completed in 1924. Height of 313 feet.
16	1000 North Water Street		296 ft (90m)	16	1991	Milwaukee	The light pink facade and windows give it a unique appearance in Milwaukee's skyline.
17	Chase Tower		288 ft (88m)	22	1961	Milwaukee	Second tallest building in Milwaukee at the time it was completed. Once the site of Marine Bank. was originally called the Marine Plaza. Later, it was known as Bank One Plaza before Bank One's merger with Chase. Contains 480,000 square feet of Class A office space and houses Milwaukee Public Radio.
18	Ascent MKE		284 ft (87 m)	25	2022	Milwaukee	The 25-story, 493,000 sq. ft. structure is the world’s tallest timber structure.
19	Wisconsin State Capitol		284 ft (86m)	15	1917	Madison	Tallest building in Madison. Tallest building in Wisconsin outside of Milwaukee.
20	Allen-Bradley Clock Tower		283 ft (86m)	17	1962	Milwaukee	The world's second-largest four-sided clock sits atop this tower.
21	Wisconsin Tower		280 ft (85m)	22	1930	Milwaukee	One of the oldest buildings in Milwaukee. Second-tallest building in Milwaukee at the time of its completion; converted into 74 condominiums in 2006.

== See also ==
- List of tallest buildings in Madison, Wisconsin
- List of tallest buildings in Milwaukee
- List of tallest buildings by U.S. state
