= Downtown Milwaukee =

Area of Milwaukee, Wisconsin, United States

- Central business district and residential area
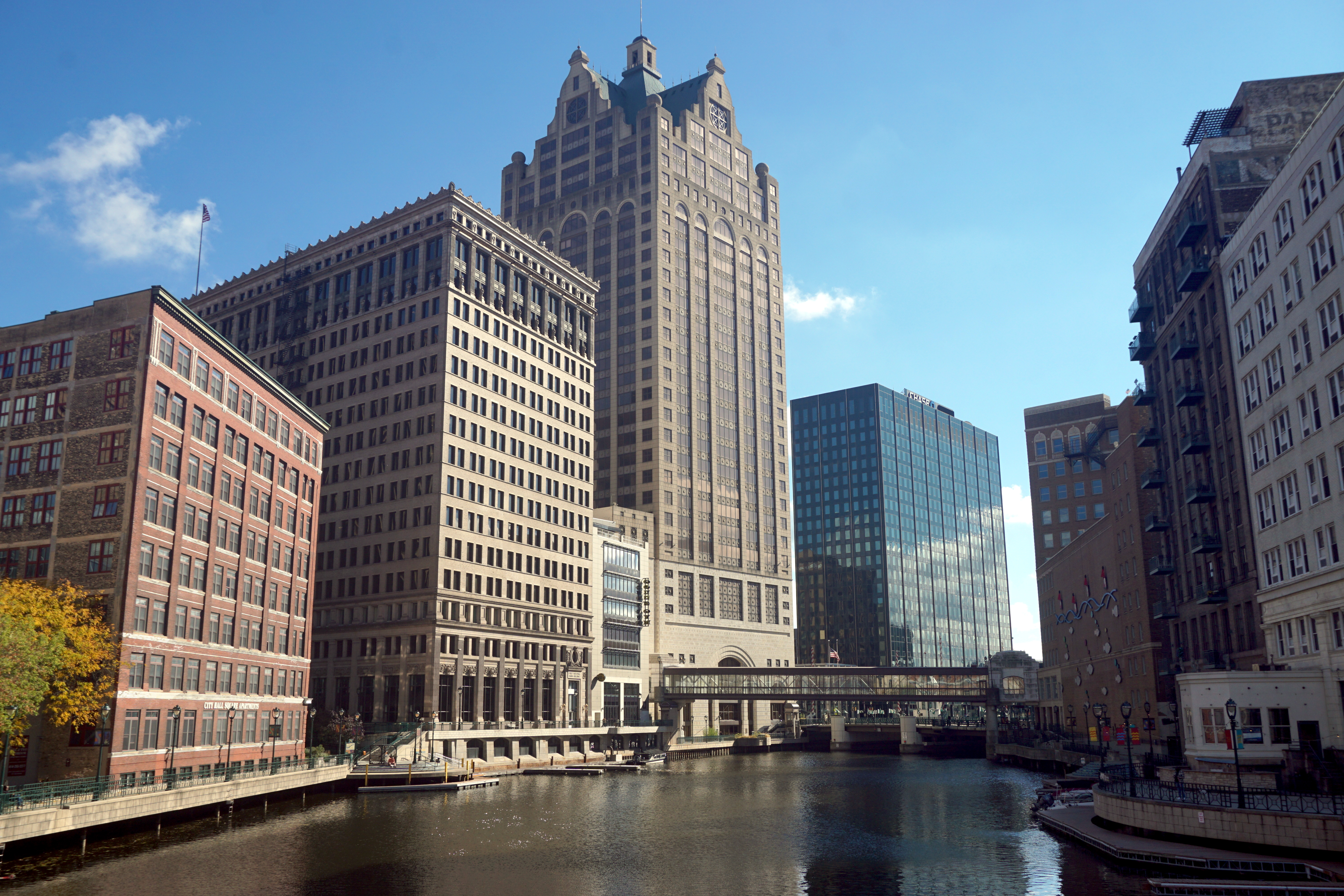
- Downtown Milwaukee from the Milwaukee River
- Interactive map of Downtown Milwaukee
- Coordinates: 43°02′30″N 87°54′40″W
- Country: United States
- State: Wisconsin

Government
  - Type: Milwaukee Common Council
  - Alderman: Robert Bauman

Area
  - Total: 2.5 sq mi (6.5 km^{2})
- Elevation: 617 ft (188 m)

Population (2020)
  - Total: 26,710
  - Density: 10,641/sq mi (4,109/km^{2})
- Time zone: UTC-6 (EST)
  - Summer (DST): UTC-5 (EDT)
- ZIP code(s): 53202, 53203
- Area code: 414
- Website: https://www.milwaukeedowntown.com/

Downtown Milwaukee is the central business district of Milwaukee, Wisconsin. The economic and symbolic center of the city and the Milwaukee metropolitan area, it is Milwaukee's oldest district and home to many of the region's cultural, financial educational and historical landmarks including Milwaukee City Hall, Fiserv Forum and the Milwaukee Art Museum. The city's modern history began in Downtown Milwaukee in 1795 when fur trader Jacques Vieau (1757–1852) built a post along a bluff on the east side, overlooking the Milwaukee and Menomonee rivers.

Downtown is bounded by Lake Michigan to the east, Interstate 43 to the west, East Brady Street Historic District to the north, and the three rivers of the confluence to the south, (Milwaukee River, Menomonee River, Kinnickinnic River). It encompasses several subdistricts, and its diverse architecture includes the Milwaukee City Hall, which was once the tallest City Hall in the world when completed in 1895. Downtown Milwaukee's residential population has grown significantly since the 2000s and especially 2010s, registering the largest population growth, by percentage, of any Milwaukee neighborhood over that time.

== History ==
The area that is now Downtown Milwaukee was once likely home to members of the Winnebago, Menominee and Potawatomi tribes. The Potawatomi was the dominant tribe in the area when French explorers first began to venture into this territory. In the years following the arrival of the French and the development of the fur trade industry, the native population rapidly declined.

French fur trader Jacques Vieau was the first European to establish a permanent structure in Milwaukee in 1795. In 1835, Native Americans ceded land to the United States, thus opening the region to further colonial settlement. By the 1840s, the area that is now Downtown Milwaukee was settled and developed by three primary actors: Solomon Juneau, Byron Kilbourn and George Walker. Their identities continue to define Downtown Milwaukee. Kilbourn is known for Kilbourntown (Westown), Juneau for East Town and Walker for what is today Walker's Point. In 1845, following the "Bridge War," the different neighborhoods merged into a jointly governed City of Milwaukee.

Through the late 19th and early 20th Centuries, Milwaukee welcomed a succession of immigrant groups from Germany, Poland, Ireland and Mexico. The population rose exponentially. Downtown Milwaukee served as the center of the region's economic engine. Ships docked along the Milwaukee and Menomonee Rivers and loaded their goods into warehouses in the Historic Third Ward and along Water Street. In 1895, Milwaukee City Hall was constructed, becoming the tallest building in the city and giving the city a prominent physical feature. Other large buildings were constructed in the early 20th century including the First National Bank Building (designed by Daniel Burnham), the 19-story AT&T Center (Milwaukee), Pabst Building, Cudahy Tower and the Wisconsin Gas Building, Milwaukee's most prominent Art Deco tower.

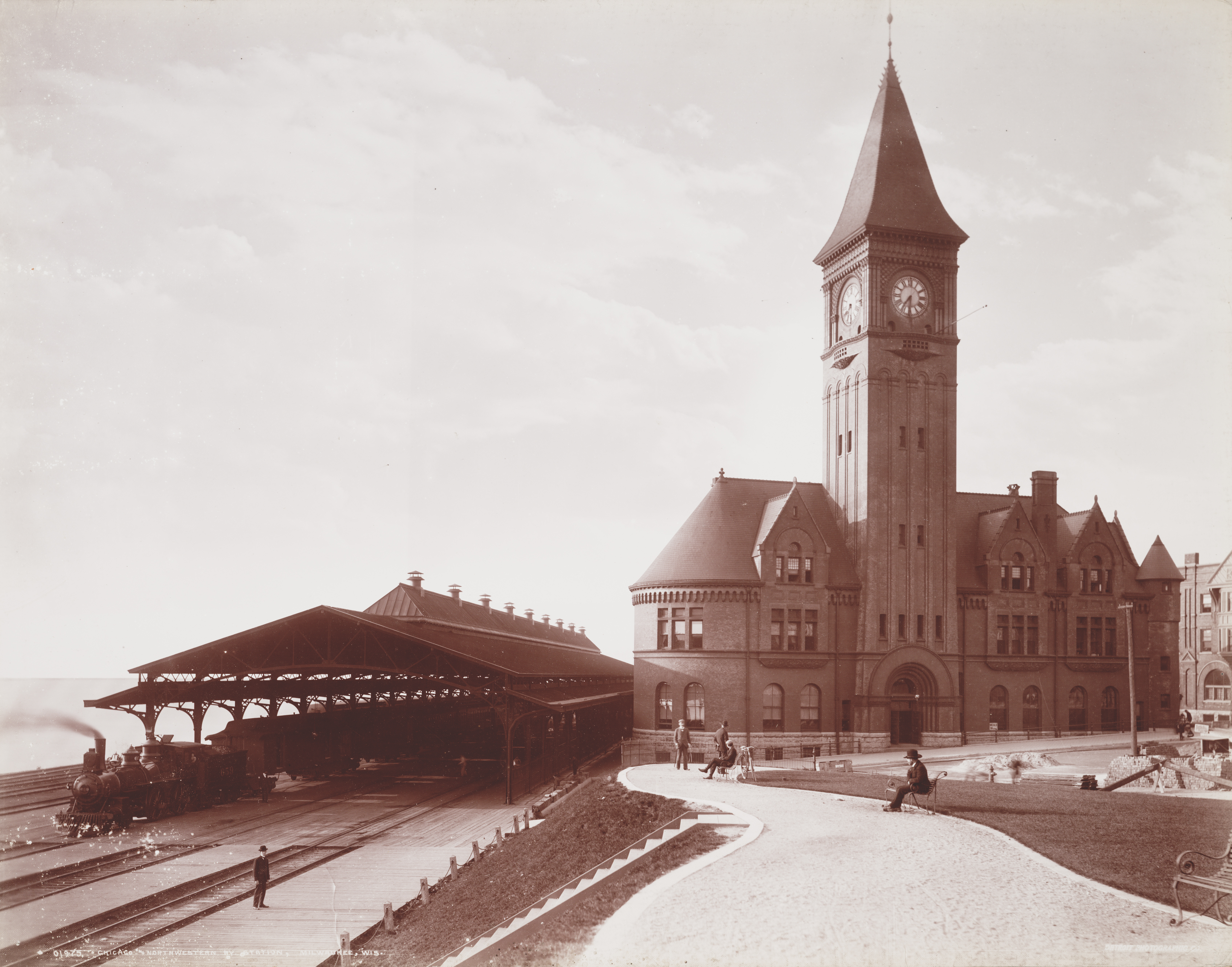
Lake Front Depot

Downtown Milwaukee declined during the rise of suburbanization and the decline of traditional downtown areas across America. In the 1950s, regional highway construction began. To make room for the highways, hundreds of structures in Downtown were demolished. The capstone of this regional Interstate Highway construction project was the completion of the Marquette Interchange in 1966. Several historic landmarks were demolished during Milwaukee's urban renewal, including the Pabst Building, Lake Front Depot, and Everett Street Depot. Mayor Henry Maier attempted to revive Downtown's economy by encouraging construction of the MECCA Arena, MECCA Great Hall, U.S. Bank Center and Henry Maier Festival Park. Maier's successor John Norquist is largely credited for beginning an ongoing renaissance in Downtown by changing urban planning policies. During his administration, Milwaukee began building the Milwaukee Riverwalk and redeveloped abandoned warehouses in the Historic Third Ward. That redevelopment continued through the 2000s and 2010s with the construction of The Hop, Wisconsin Center, Fiserv Forum, University Club Tower, the Santiago Calatrava designed wing of the Milwaukee Art Museum and Northwestern Mutual Tower and Commons. Downtown Milwaukee's residential population grew significantly in the 2000s and 2010s.

Today, Downtown Milwaukee remains the site of Wisconsin's tallest buildings, with the state's twenty tallest buildings all situated there, except for the Wisconsin State Capitol.

== Neighborhoods ==
Downtown Milwaukee covers an area of 2.5 square miles with a recorded population of 26,710 in 2020. The district includes several neighborhoods with distinctive land use patterns, architectural styles and histories. East Town, Westown, Historic Third Ward, Lower East Side, Yankee Hill are the primary neighborhoods within Downtown Milwaukee. East Town is the traditional core financial district while Westown has adopted a more transportation and cultural activity based profile. The Third Ward and Lower East Side are primarily residential and retail districts adjacent to the Downtown core.

=== East Town ===
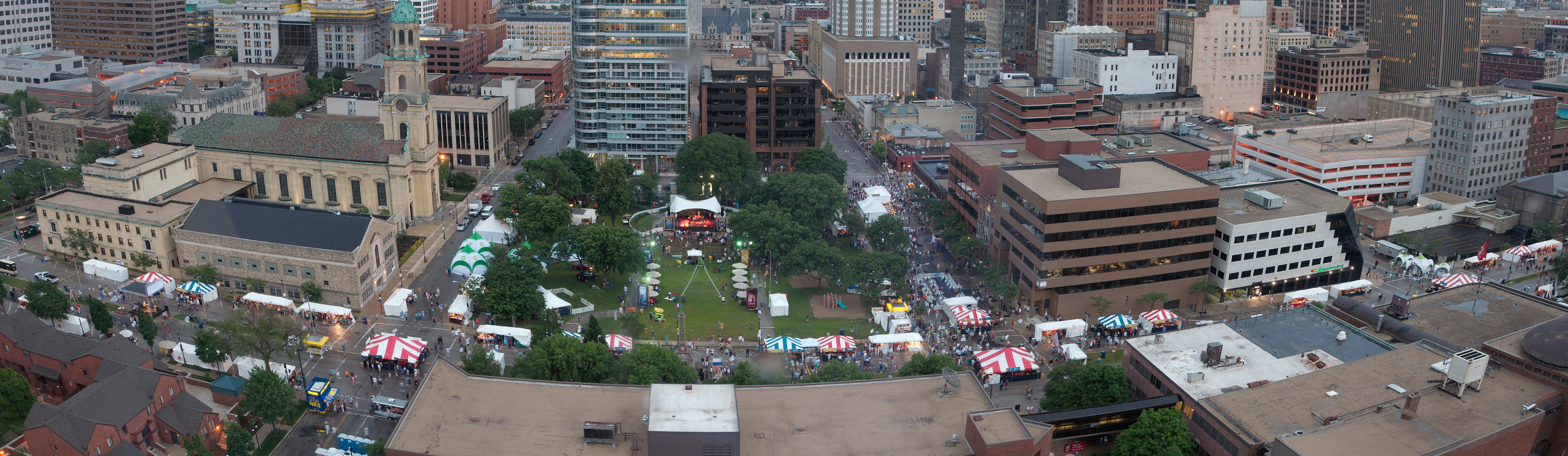
East Town during Bastille Days, facing south toward downtown; Cathedral of St. John the Evangelist on the left.

East Town is a neighborhood bounded by Lake Michigan to the east, the Milwaukee River to the west, Interstate 794 to the south and State Street to the north. was formerly known as the historic Juneau Town settlement, which had competed with the neighboring Kilbourn Town (present-day Westown) for people and resources. With the Milwaukee River as the division, these two "towns" have remarkably different feels. East Town is regarded as a more vibrant, densely populated area and one less severely impacted by the urban renewal efforts of the 1950s and 60s. Today most of Downtown Milwaukee's major office and residential developments are located in East Town. The U.S. Bank Center, Northwestern Mutual Tower and Commons, 100 East Wisconsin and University Club Tower are all located in the neighborhood. Most of the stops on The Hop are located in the East Town neighborhood.

The neighborhood also contains the Cathedral of St. John the Evangelist and Old St. Mary's Church which have survived from the early days of Milwaukee. The East Town Neighborhood Association hosts Jazz in the Park, an outdoor music concert series at Cathedral Square Park. The area has become the center of Milwaukee nightlife featuring several trendy nightclubs, and outdoor upscale eateries. In summer, East Town sponsors the Parisian festival Bastille Days and in winter the Holiday City of Lights.

=== Yankee Hill ===
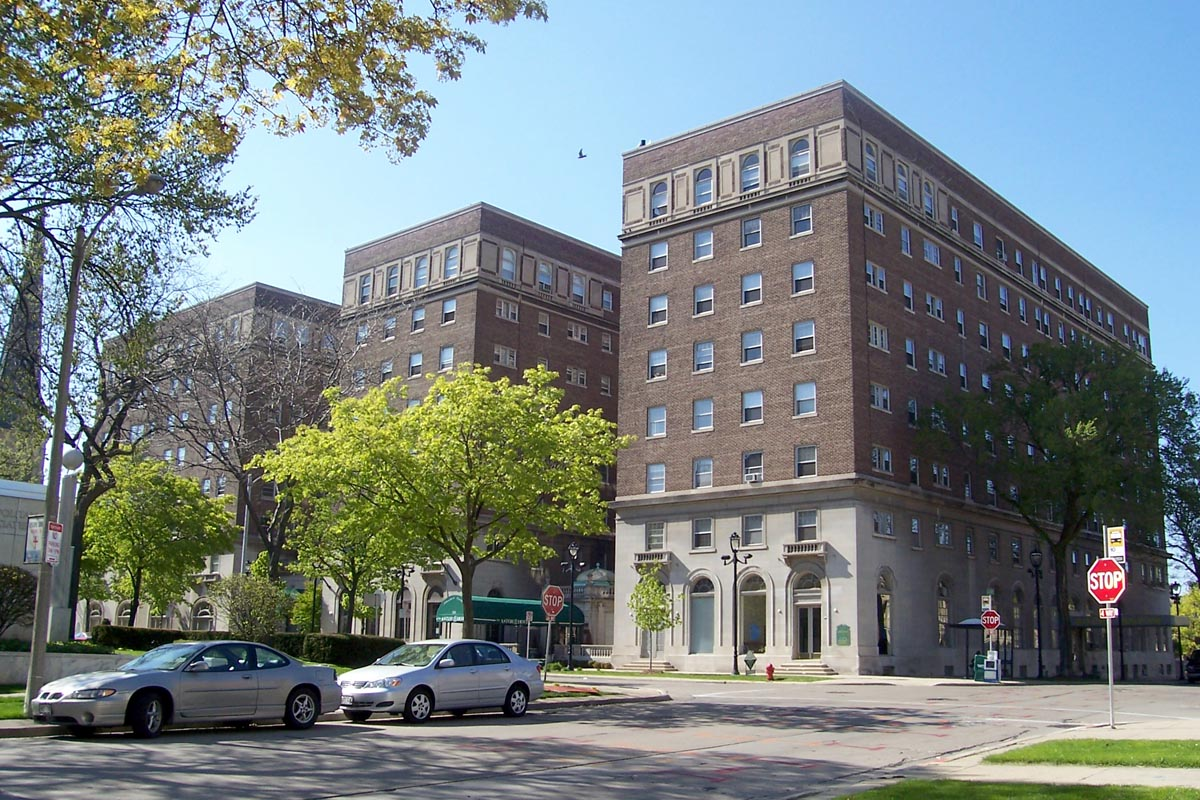
The Astor Hotel in Yankee Hill

The Yankee Hill neighborhood encompass the eastern portion of downtown Milwaukee's central business district from Jackson Avenue to the west, Lake Michigan to the east, Ogden Avenue (i.e., the lower East Side) to the north and State Street to the south.

Yankee Hill is a key part of the East Town neighborhood, situated within East Town's boundaries, but closer to the lake and north of downtown. Yankee Hill is home to the Milwaukee School of Engineering and several large residential complexes. In the 1950s, the Milwaukee Redevelopment Authority cleared 223 buildings and displaced more than 1,000 residents. Thirty city square blocks were cleared in preparation for the construction of a never built interstate highway. The area has since recovered with the construction of thousands of new apartments in major projects like Ascent MKE, Yankee Hill and Juneau Village complexes. The neighborhood saw 251% population growth between 2000 and 2020.

=== Historic Third Ward ===
Once home to Irish, and then, Italian immigrants, the Historic Third Ward, located just south of downtown, is now an upper-class mixed-use neighborhood. The Third Ward is noted for a large number of condominium and loft apartments, antique stores, boutiques and art galleries. Access to Milwaukee's Maier Festival Grounds, best known for Summerfest, can be obtained from through this neighborhood. It is home to the Milwaukee Institute of Art & Design, the Milwaukee Public Market, the Broadway Theatre Center and Milwaukee Riverwalk. The neighborhood is now home to several high-end restaurants and national retailers. The area is one of the best served by public transit in Milwaukee including the Milwaukee County Transit System and The Hop. The majority of the historic structures in the neighborhood have been redeveloped and by the 2020s the remaining surface parking lots became targeted for redevelopment by the city and developers. 333 North Water is a 31-story residential high-rise located in the northwest portion of the neighborhood across the street from the Milwaukee Public Market.

=== Westown ===
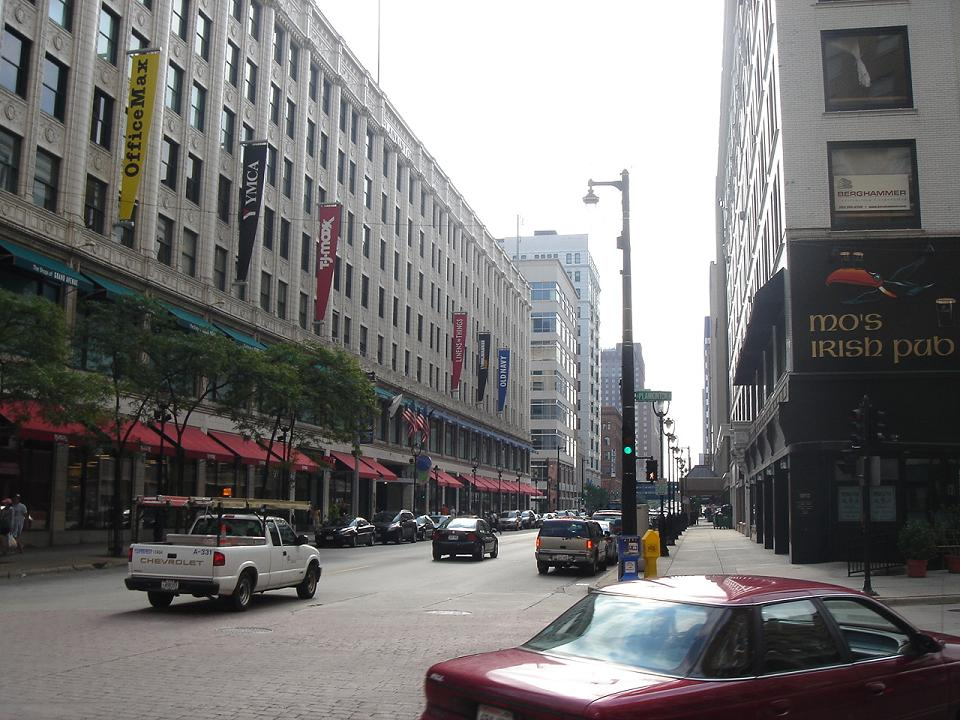
The exterior of the Shops of Grand Avenue

Westown is an area west of the Milwaukee River and downtown, bounded by Interstate 794 to the south, Marquette University to the west, McKinley Avenue to the north, and the Milwaukee River to the east. The neighborhood comprises the original Kilbourn Town in what is now downtown Milwaukee. The Shops of Grand Avenue, Wisconsin Center and Milwaukee Symphony Orchestra are located on Wisconsin Avenue, the primary east-west avenue in the city. Westown suffered heavily during Milwaukee's urban renewal period with hundreds of historic structures demolished in an attempt to revive the area. Other attractions in this neighborhood include the Milwaukee Public Museum, Pabst Brewery Complex, Fiserv Forum, the UW–Milwaukee Panther Arena, the Milwaukee County Courthouse, the Wisconsin Club and Old World Third Street. In 2013, The Moderne opened to residents, the structure is the tallest in the Westown neighborhood and the tallest in Wisconsin west of the Milwaukee River.

The Westown neighborhood has seen a substantial amount of redevelopment since the 2000s with major employers like Fiserv and Milwaukee Tool announcing high-profile office relocations to the neighborhood. The Shops of Grand Avenue underwent a major renovation project between 2019 and 2022, eventually reopening to the public in 2022 as The Avenue (Milwaukee) and anchored by a ground floor food hall with apartments and office space above. Newaukee, a local social architecture firm has hosted popular street fairs during the summer months on Wisconsin Avenue since 2014.

== Parks ==
Downtown Milwaukee has several major parks which are under the jurisdiction of the Milwaukee County Parks System. They include Veterans Park, Cathedral Square Park, Juneau Park, Catalano Square, Zeidler Union Square, MacArthur Square, Pere Marquette Park, Red Arrow Park, Burns Commons, Marshall Park, McKinley Park, Back Bay Park, Pulaski Park and Brady Street Park. Downtown Milwaukee is home to Lakefront State Park, one of two Wisconsin State Park properties in the city of Milwaukee. The area is also home to the Milwaukee Riverwalk which opened in 1993 and now extends 3.1 miles along both sides of the Milwaukee River, from the former North Avenue Dam, through Downtown and the Historic Third Ward to Lake Michigan. The Milwaukee Riverwalk is regarded as a catalyst in the redevelopment of Downtown Milwaukee and its reconnection to the Milwaukee River.

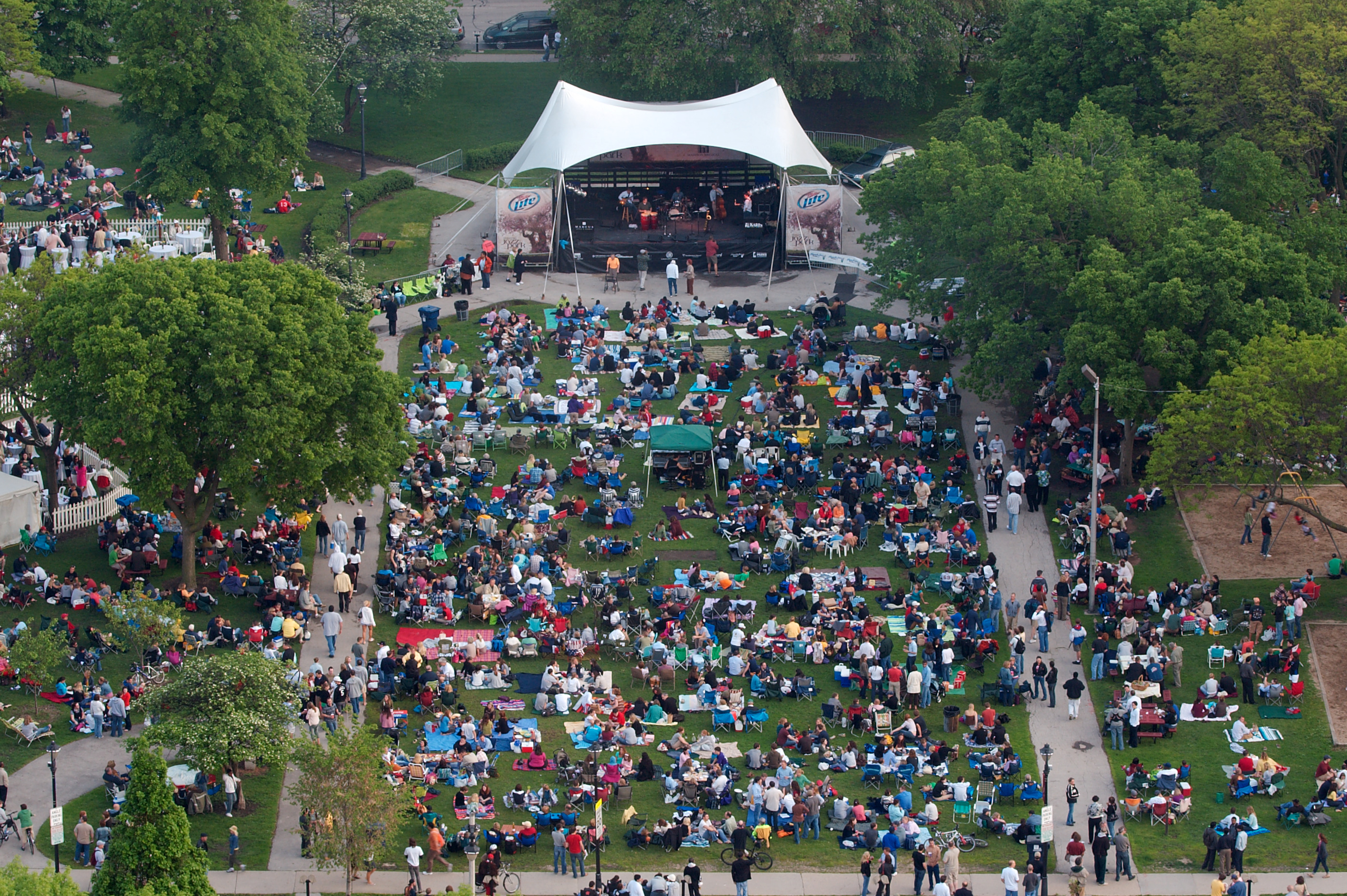
Jazz in the Park, Cathedral Square Park

Henry Maier Festival Park is located in Downtown Milwaukee along the shore of Lake Michigan and adjacent to Lakefront State Park. The 75-acre festival park is the site of the annual Summerfest musical festival and the home of the American Family Insurance Amphitheater. It also plays host to 11 other ethnic and cultural festivals as well as several run and walks for charity events. The park is set atop a closed and redeveloped army base and was opened for public use in 1970. It plays a central component in Metropolitan Milwaukee's cultural space and is a major driver for the regional tourist economy.

== Demographics ==
Downtown Milwaukee – Racial and ethnic composition Note: the US Census treats Hispanic/Latino as an ethnic category. This table excludes Latinos from the racial categories and assigns them to a separate category. Hispanics/Latinos may be of any race.
Race / Ethnicity (NH = Non-Hispanic)	Pop 2000	Pop 2010	Pop 2020	% 2000	% 2010	% 2020
White alone (NH)	5,231	7,516	9,797	69.32%	71.46%	72.27%
Black or African American alone (NH)	1,628	1,788	1,463	21.57%	17.00%	10.79%
Native American or Alaska Native alone (NH)	31	39	44	0.41%	0.37%	0.32%
Asian alone (NH)	382	559	862	5.06%	5.31%	6.36%
Native Hawaiian or Pacific Islander alone (NH)	9	7	2	0.12%	0.07%	0.01%
Other race alone (NH)	7	10	81	0.09%	0.10%	0.60%
Mixed race or Multiracial (NH)	99	158	451	1.31%	1.50%	3.33%
Hispanic or Latino (any race)	159	441	856	2.11%	4.19%	6.31%
Total	7,546	10,518	13,556	100.00%	100.00%	100.00%

== Transportation ==
Downtown Milwaukee is the hub of the Milwaukee County Transit System which is the largest transit agency in the state of Wisconsin. The majority of the system's bus lines run through downtown and there are several transit points between lines located in the neighborhood. The Hop is a 2.1 mile modern streetcar system which provides free public transportation to residents and visitors of the neighborhood. The system contains 1 line with 18 stops. There are plans to extend the system but as of 2022 they remain unfunded and service is contained within Downtown. Service on The Hop began in November, 2018.

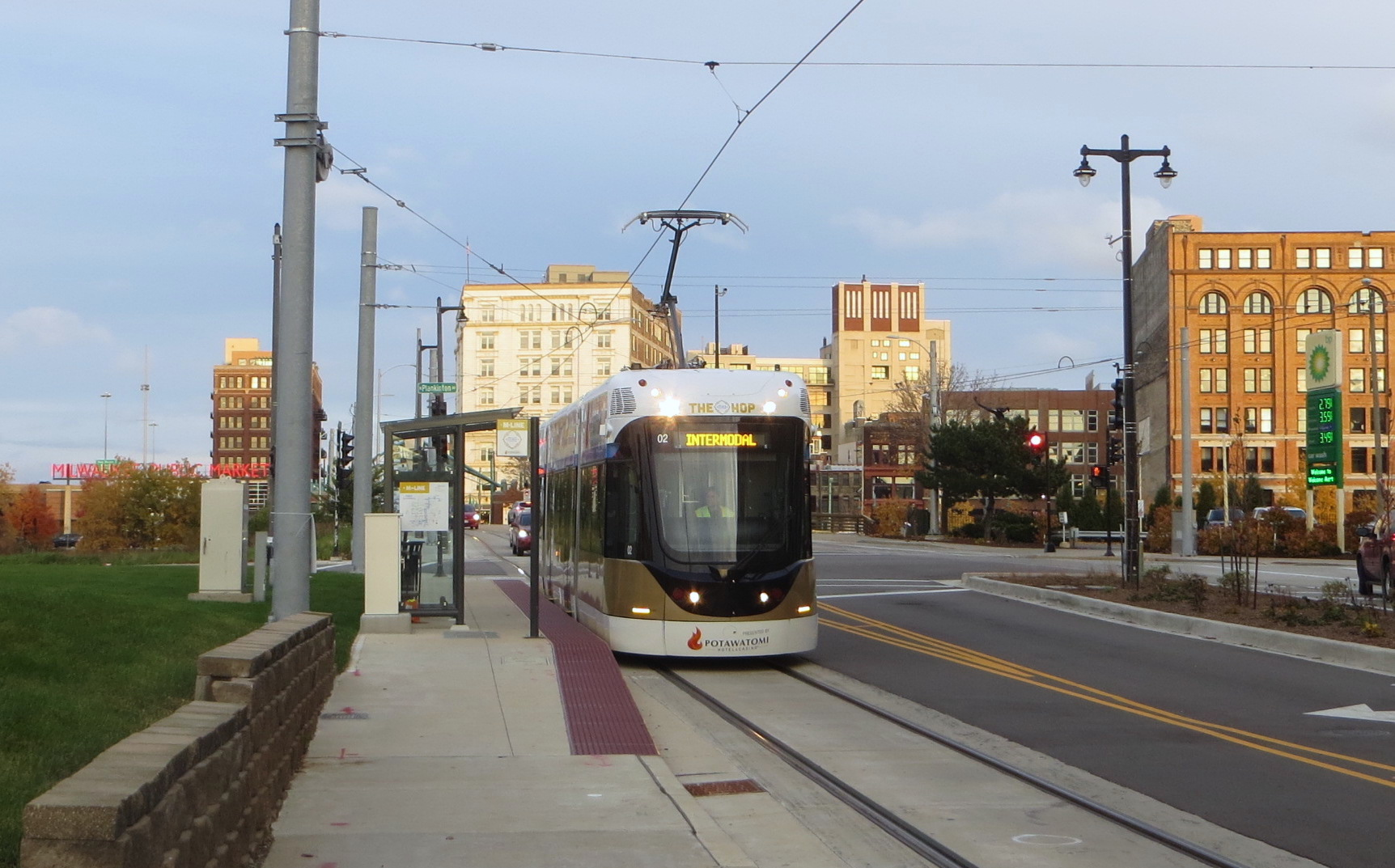
The Hop approaching St. Paul and Plankinton

The neighborhood is regionally connected by Interstate 794, Interstate 43, Interstate 94, U.S. Route 18 in Wisconsin and the Hoan Bridge. The Marquette Interchange is a prominent physical feature of Downtown Milwaukee and the regional transportation network. It is a major freeway interchange where Interstate 43, Interstate 794 and Interstate 94 meet. Originally built in the 1960s, the interchange underwent a total rebuild between 2004 and 2008, and was officially opened on August 19, 2008, after what was at the time the largest construction project in state history. It is the second busiest freeway interchange in the State of Wisconsin behind the Zoo Interchange.

== See also ==
- Neighborhoods of Milwaukee
