= List of places in California (Y) =

List of places in California - Y

This list of current:

- cities
- towns, unincorporated communities
- counties, and other recognized places in the U.S. state of California.

Information on the number and names of counties in which the place lies, and its lower and upper ZIP Code bounds, if applicable are also included.

Name of place	Number of counties	Principal county	Lower zip code	Upper zip code
Yankee Hill	1	Butte County	95965	
Yankee Hill	1	Tuolumne County		
Yankee Jims	1	Placer County	95713	
Yarmouth	1	San Joaquin County		
Yellowjacket	1	Tehama County		
Yerba Buena Island	1	San Francisco County		
Yermo	1	San Bernardino County	92398	
Yettem	1	Tulare County	93670	
Ygnacio Valley	1	Contra Costa County	94598	
Yokohl	1	Tulare County		
Yokuts Valley	1	Fresno County	93675	
Yolano	1	Solano County	95620	
Yolo	1	Yolo County	95697	
Yontocket	1	Del Norte County		
Yorba	1	Los Angeles County	91767	
Yorba Linda	1	Orange County	92885	87
York	1	Los Angeles County	90050	
Yorkville	1	Mendocino County	95494	
Yosemite Forks	1	Madera County		
Yosemite Junction	1	Tuolumne County	95389	
Yosemite Lakes	1	Madera County		
Yosemite Lakes Park	1	Madera County		
Yosemite Lodge	1	Mariposa County	95389	
Yosemite National Park	3	Madera County	95389	
Yosemite National Park	3	Mariposa County	95389	
Yosemite National Park	3	Tuolumne County	95389	
Yosemite National Park	1	Mariposa County	95389	
Yosemite Valley	1	Mariposa County		
Yosemite Village	1	Mariposa County		
You Bet	1	Nevada County		
Youngstown	1	San Joaquin County		
Yountville	1	Napa County	94599	
Yreka	1	Siskiyou County	96097	
Yreka City	1	Siskiyou County	96097	
Yuba City	1	Sutter County	95991	
Yuba City Farm Labor Center	1	Sutter County	95991	
South Yuba City	1	Sutter County	95991	
Yuba–Sutter area	2	Sutter County Yuba County		
Yucaipa	1	San Bernardino County	92399	
Yucca Grove	1	San Bernardino County		
Yucca Inn	1	San Bernardino County		
Yucca Valley	1	San Bernardino County	92284	
Yurok Indian Reservation	2	Del Norte County	95546	
Yurok Indian Reservation	2	Humboldt County	95546	
