= Yankee Hill =

Yankee Hill may refer to:

- Yankee Hill, Butte County, California
- Yankee Hill, Tuolumne County, California
- Yankee Hill, Colorado, a populated place in Colorado
- Yankee Hill, Nebraska
- Yankee Hill, Milwaukee, Wisconsin
