= Youngtown =

Youngtown may refer to:

- Youngtown, Tasmania, suburb of Launceston, Tasmania, Australia
- Youngtown, Arizona, town in Maricopa County, Arizona, United States
- Youngtown, Alabama, populated place in Lawrence County, Alabama, United States

== See also ==
- Youngstown (disambiguation)
