= WUWM =

Public radio station in Milwaukee, Wisconsin

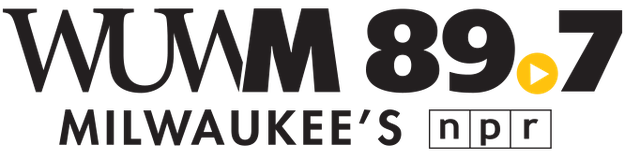
- Milwaukee, Wisconsin; United States
- Broadcast area: Greater Milwaukee
- Frequency: 89.7 MHz
- Branding: Milwaukee's NPR

Programming
- Format: Public Radio and talk
- Affiliations: NPR; Public Radio International; American Public Media; BBC World Service

Ownership
- Owner: University of Wisconsin–Milwaukee; (Board of Regents, University of Wisconsin System)

History
- First air date: September 24, 1964
- Call sign meaning: University of Wisconsin-Milwaukee

Technical information
- Licensing authority: FCC
- Facility ID: 4285
- Class: B
- ERP: 13,500 watts
- HAAT: 289 meters (948 ft)
- Transmitter coordinates: 43°05′26″N 87°53′50″W

Links
- Public license information: Public file; LMS
- Webcast: Listen live
- Website: wuwm.com

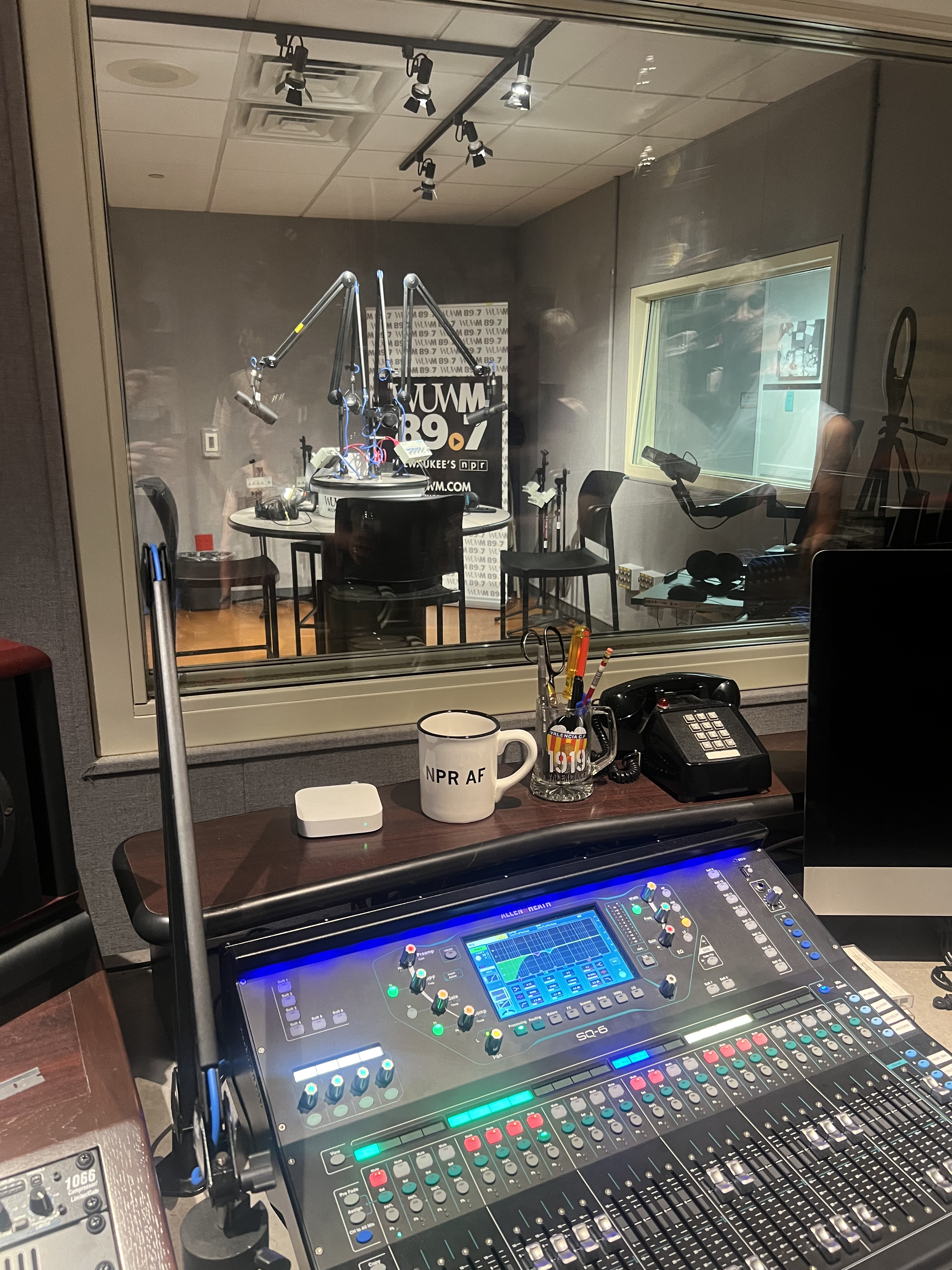
WUWM

WUWM (89.7 FM, "Milwaukee's NPR") is a non-commercial radio station in Milwaukee, Wisconsin. It is owned and operated by the University of Wisconsin–Milwaukee with the license held by the Board of Regents of the University of Wisconsin System. A unit of the UW-Milwaukee College of Letters and Science, the station's studios and offices are on the seventh floor of Chase Tower on Wisconsin Avenue near Water Street in Downtown Milwaukee.

WUWM is a Class B FM station, with an effective radiated power (ERP) of 13,500 watts. The transmitter is atop the WITI TV Tower in Shorewood.

== Programming ==
WUWM airs programs such as Morning Edition, All Things Considered, Fresh Air, 1A, On Point, Marketplace and Here and Now from National Public Radio (NPR), Public Radio International and American Public Media. It also carries the BBC World Service overnight.

WUWM is the largest NPR member in the state that is not part of the statewide Wisconsin Public Radio network. WPR operates a station in Greater Milwaukee, Delafield-licensed WHAD. For the better part of its history, WUWM has purposely avoided duplicating weekend programming with WHAD. However, in May 2024, as part of a major realignment of WPR's stations, WHAD now features the WPR Music network around the clock (with the WPR News network now exclusive to its HD Radio subchannel), leaving WUWM as the sole outlet for NPR news and talk in Milwaukee.

Each weekday, WUWM has an hour of local interviews and call-ins called Lake Effect. It is heard at noon and repeated most nights at 8 p.m. WUWM has periodic fundraisers on the air and appeals for donations on its website. WUWM also airs some weekend music shows, and until his retirement in April 2024, carried a weekly adult album alternative program hosted by longtime Milwaukee radio personality (and early WUWM staff member) Bob Reitman called It's Alright Ma, It's Only Music.

== History ==
WUWM signed on the air on September 24, 1964. Originally a place for students to train for broadcasting careers, it took on a more professional outlook with the formation of the Corporation for Public Broadcasting. It became a charter member of NPR in 1971, and remained independently operated from what was then known as the Wisconsin Educational Radio Network, even after the same year's merger of the Wisconsin State University system and the University of Wisconsin into the combined University of Wisconsin System.

However, its signal was largely limited to the area around the UW-Milwaukee campus and Milwaukee's East Side. That changed in 1978, when WITI owner Storer Broadcasting donated space on its tower for the station, allowing it to eventually have the same signal range as the area's television stations, including channel 6. It was originally limited to 1,500 watts due to a glut of stations on the lower end of the FM dial in the Chicago-Milwaukee-Madison axis. However, a change in FCC regulations gave priority to fully qualified public radio stations. It gradually increased its power to 15,500 watts, giving it a coverage area comparable to those of the major commercial FM stations in the Milwaukee market.

Its weekday schedule changed in 1988, going with all news, talk and information. That was well before most NPR stations in markets of Milwaukee's size made a similar move, replacing weekday music shows with spoken-word programming.

In January 2010, WUWM's studios moved from the Shops of Grand Avenue to facilities in the Chase Tower in Downtown Milwaukee. The Chase Tower has studios, offices and production stations for recording upcoming shows and features.

Until December 2013, the station broadcast using HD Radio technology. It operated an automated AAA station on its second HD digital subchannel, known as The Deuce. The HD transmitter broke down in December 2013, and WUWM opted not to replace it. According to the station's general manager at the time, Dave Edwards (who was also the chairman of the NPR board), the HD2 stream attracted minimal listenership over the air, and only 200 listeners per week online. With little outside of a small jump in audio quality on the main signal to justify the technology, station officials concluded it was not worth the effort to bring the HD transmitter back online.
