= Youngstown (disambiguation) =

Youngstown, Ohio is a city in the US state of Ohio and the county seat of Mahoning County.

Youngstown may also refer to:

- Youngstown (band), an American boy band
- "Youngstown" (song), 1995, by Bruce Springsteen
- Youngstown, Alberta
- Youngstown, California
- Youngstown, Florida
- Youngstown, Indiana
- Youngstown, Missouri
- Youngstown, New York
- Youngstown, Pennsylvania
- Youngstown State University, in Ohio
- Youngstown Sheet & Tube Co. v. Sawyer, a 1952 United States Supreme Court case delineating the federal executive power

== See also ==
- Britannia Youngstown, Edmonton, Alberta
