= Chase Tower (Milwaukee) =

High-rise building in Milwaukee, Wisconsin, U.S.

- The building from the intersection of Wisconsin and Water, in 2024
- Former names: Bank One Plaza; Marine National Exchange; Marine Plaza Building

General information
- Status: Completed
- Type: Commercial office
- Architectural style: International
- Location: 111 East Wisconsin Avenue, Milwaukee, Wisconsin, United States
- Coordinates: 43.0382908°N 87.9094330°W
- Opening: 1961
- Owner: Group RMC
- Operator: CBRE

Height
- Height: 288 ft (88 m)

Technical details
- Floor count: 22

Design and construction
- Architect: Harrison & Abramovitz

Other information
- Public transit: MCTS; The Hop

The Chase Tower is a 22-story, 288-foot-tall (88 m) high-rise building in downtown Milwaukee, Wisconsin, United States. Built in the International style, the building has a very dark green facade. It is located alongside the Milwaukee River, at the corner of East Wisconsin Avenue and North Water Street. The Chase Tower includes 480,000 square feet (45,000 m^{2}) of office space and a 746-space parking structure.

Presently, the building is home to a Chase Bank branch and underground vault, the studios of Milwaukee Public Radio (WUWM), a few eateries, and numerous office tenants including JPMorgan Chase, Empower Retirement, and law firm O’Neil, Cannon, Hollman, DeJong & Laing. Skywalks connect it to its parking structure to the south and the Shops of Grand Avenue across the river via the ASQ Center.

== History ==
The building was completed in 1961, and was formerly known as Bank One Plaza until their merger with Chase. Before that, it was home to Marine Bank and was known as the Marine Plaza. In 2021, the building was sold to Group RMC and is currently managed by CBRE.

Currently, it is the 18th tallest building in Milwaukee. It was the second tallest building in Milwaukee from 1961 until September 1973, when U.S. Bank Center was completed.

In June 2016, the Farbman Group acquired the building for $30.5 million from Brookfield Real Estate Opportunity Fund. They have since made significant updates to the lobbies, common areas and amenity space on the first and second floors, as well as the attached parking structure.

In November 2021, Group RMC purchased the building with plans to reposition the building as a Class A Office building. Since they purchased the building in 2021, the main lobby off of Water Street has undergone a multimillion-dollar renovation. The owner has also created new Tenant amenity spaces such as a Fitness Center, Tenant Lounge, and Tenant conference room. Several floors have also had their elevator lobby & restrooms renovated since Group RMC took over as well. Currently, Chase Tower is managed by CBRE Group, and their leasing team is Colliers International.

== See also ==
- List of tallest buildings in Milwaukee

Records
Preceded by Wisconsin Tower	2nd Tallest building in Milwaukee; 1961—1973; 88m	Succeeded by Milwaukee City Hall
