= U.S. Bank Center (Milwaukee) =

Office building in Milwaukee, Wisconsin

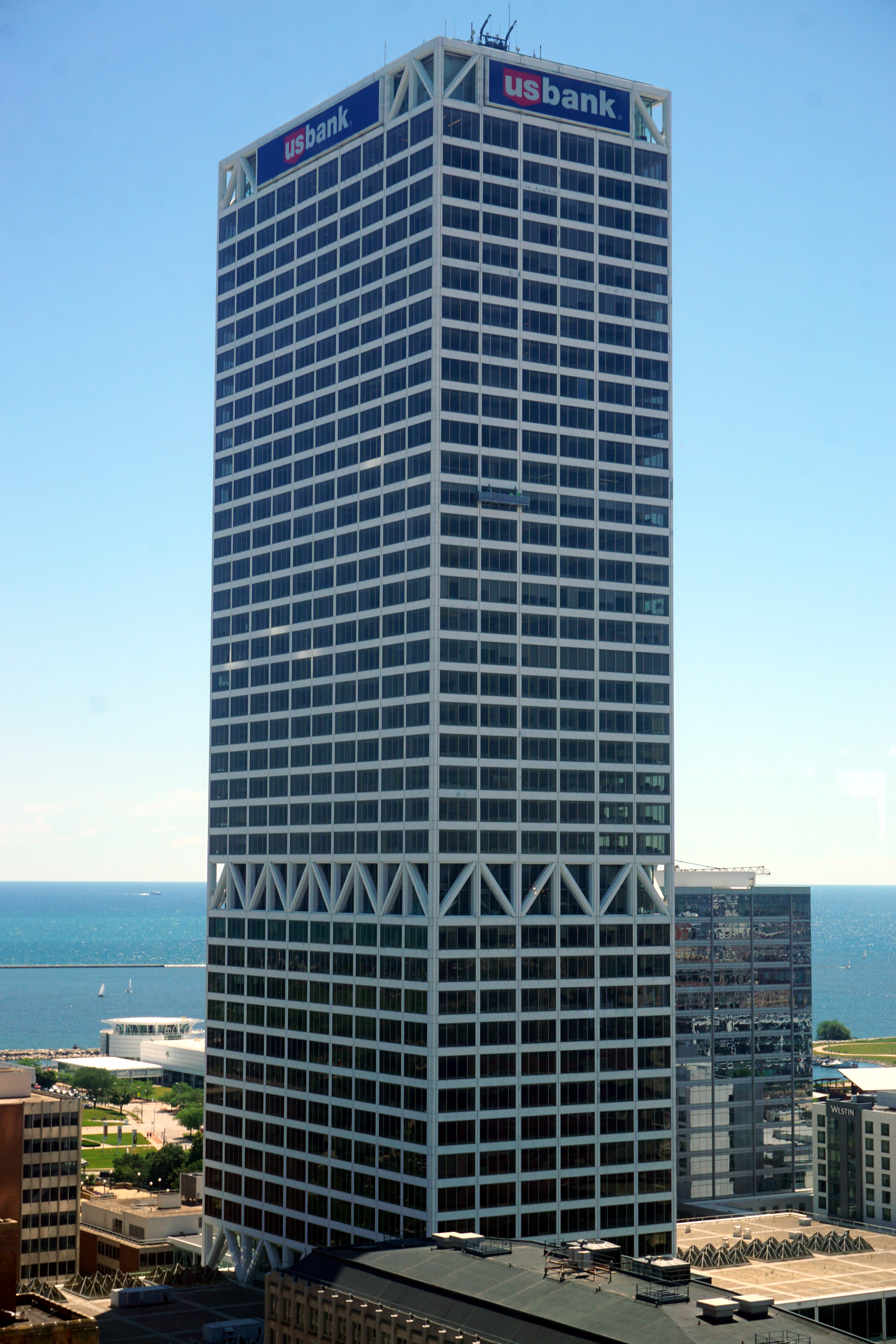
- U.S. Bank Center in 2022
- Former names: First Wisconsin Center (1973-1992); Firstar Center (1992-2002)

General information
- Type: Skyscraper
- Architectural style: International style
- Location: Milwaukee, Wisconsin, U.S., 777 East Wisconsin Avenue
- Coordinates: 43°2′17.66″N 87°54′8.13″W
- Current tenants: U.S. Bancorp
- Construction started: April 1971; 55 years ago
- Completed: September 4, 1973; 53 years ago
- Cost: $50 million
- Owner: U.S. Bank National Association

Height
- Height: 601 feet (183 m)

Technical details
- Structural system: Trussed tube
- Floor count: 42
- Floor area: 1,236,203 ft^{2} (114,847.0 m^{2})
- Lifts/elevators: 20

Design and construction
- Architects: Bruce Graham; James DeStefano
- Architecture firm: Skidmore, Owings & Merrill
- Structural engineer: Fazlur Rahman Khan
- Other designers: Fitzhugh Scott
- Main contractor: Morse Diesel International

Other information
- Public transit: MCTS

Website
- usbcmilwaukee.com

U.S. Bank Center is a skyscraper in downtown Milwaukee, Wisconsin. Standing 601 feet (183 m) and 42 stories tall, it is the tallest building in the state of Wisconsin and the tallest building between Chicago and Minneapolis. The building has a floor area of 1,236,203 ft^{2} (114,847.0 m^{2}). As of 2026, major tenants included the main headquarters of Baird, Foley & Lardner, and Sensient Technologies, as well as regional offices for U.S. Bank and Deloitte.

The building was designed by architects Bruce Graham and James DeStefano of Skidmore, Owings & Merrill, and engineered by Fazlur Rahman Khan. It was topped off on August 29, 1972, and completed in 1973. It was the headquarters for Firstar Corporation from 1973 to 2001.

== History ==
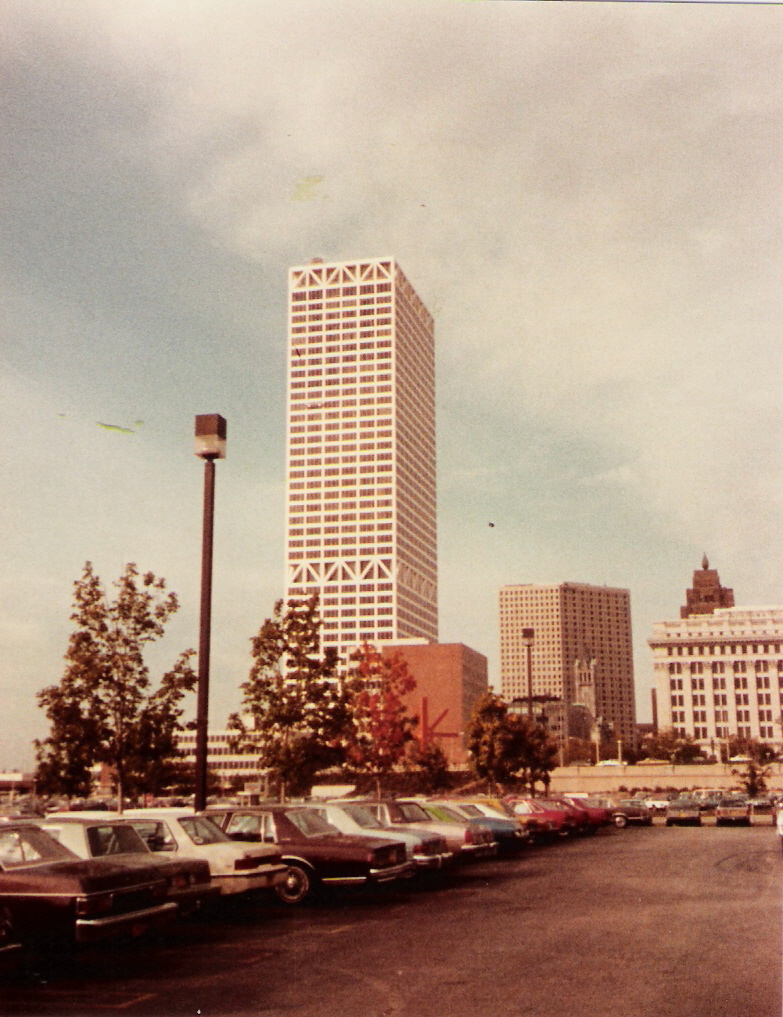
The U.S. Bank Center, then known as First Wisconsin Center, pictured in 1984 before the construction of the Milwaukee Art Museum and the addition of branded signage

Plans were initially announced by First Wisconsin National Bank to construct a new headquarters building on August 21, 1969. Although no architectural designs were complete at the time of its announcement, bank officials indicated it would rise at least 40 stories. On March 18, 1971, bank officials unveiled the final design as a 42-story, 601-foot (183 m) skyscraper, encompassing a full block fronting on East Wisconsin Avenue. Designed by James DeStefano of the Chicago office of Skidmore, Owings & Merrill, with Fitzhugh Scott Architects of Milwaukee serving as an associate planner for the project, the name of the tower was announced as the First Wisconsin Center.

The building was topped-out on August 29, 1972, with the installing of the final 20-foot (6.1 m) steel beam atop the tower. Along with bank officials, mayor Henry Maier, county executive John Doyne, and Wisconsin governor Patrick Lucey attended the ceremony.

Near the end of construction in 1973, two fatalities occurred at the work site. In May, a foreman died after being struck by a dump truck. In July, one worker died and four others were injured when a derrick used in installing a 175-pound (79 kg) aluminum panel broke free and fell 41 floors to the ground.

The building was initially occupied on September 4, 1973, and celebrated its official opening on October 6, 1973.

=== First Wisconsin Center ===
While still under construction in September 1972, a group of local developers responsible for the neighboring Juneau Square development filed suit against First Wisconsin. The $138 million suit alleged the bank acted in a "monopolistic" manner to control office development, in an effort to derail the plaintiffs proposed 25-story office tower project on a property adjacent to the First Wisconsin Center. After several years of litigation, the suit finally went to trial in May 1976. The following October, the court found First Wisconsin guilty and awarded the plaintiffs $6 million in damages that was then tripled to $18 million due to federal laws on damages awarded to antitrust suits. First Wisconsin appealed the ruling, and in August 1977, a federal court ruled the case be retried due to the complexity of the original trial, along with the plaintiffs being allowed more time and the admission of hearsay testimony. Upon appeal, in June 1978 the court ruled in favor of First Wisconsin in clearing the company of all charges.

After remaining under the ownership of First Wisconsin since its opening, in June 1987 it was announced the tower would be purchased for $195 million by the Dallas development company Trammell Crow. At the time of the announced sale, Trammell Crow unveiled plans to construct a 50-story tower southeast of the First Wisconsin Center in overtaking it as the state's tallest building. It has since remained unbuilt. The sale was completed in January 1988 with Trammell Crow paying $195 million for the complex, only to subsequently sell it to an investment partnership for $220.9 million.

=== Firstar Center ===
In December 1988, First Wisconsin changed its name to Firstar Corporation as its operations expanded beyond the state of Wisconsin. In May 1992 the First Wisconsin brand was dropped and all retail banking operations were unified under the name Firstar Bank. As a result, on September 14, 1992, the building was renamed the Firstar Center. In 1996, a $1.2 million skywalk was constructed over Van Buren Street to connect the tower with the neighboring Lewis Center. The addition was funded in part by the city of Milwaukee as an economic development project as Firstar had significant operations in both the tower and neighboring Lewis Center.

In 1998, the ownership partnership of The Equitable Life Assurance Society of the United States, the State of Wisconsin Investment Board, and the California Public Employees' Retirement System (CalPERS) decided to place the center on the market. The following November Star Banc Corporation of Cincinnati announced the re-purchase of the tower into company hands for $200 million at the time of their purchase of Firstar.

=== U.S. Bank Center ===
In October 2000, Firstar Corporation announced its purchase of U.S. Bancorp and stated the new company would take the U.S. Bank moniker. The Firstar–U.S. Bancorp merger was approved in February 2001, and on May 3, 2002, the Firstar Center became the U.S. Bank Center when the rebranding was completed in Wisconsin. In April 2008, a panel in the center's adjacent parking garage fell and crushed a car. As a result of this incident, the building owners decided to tear down the garage constructed in 1973 and replace it with a six-story, precast concrete garage. The 1,000 parking space garage opened in June 2010.

The windows on the U.S. Bank Center are sometimes used to display lighted messages, during significant events in Milwaukee. In 2003, the letters "HD", for Harley Davidson, were displayed during HarleyFest to signify their 100th anniversary. In 2005, the letters "UWM", for University of Wisconsin–Milwaukee, were displayed during their Milwaukee Panthers men's basketball team's Sweet Sixteen run in the 2005 NCAA Men's Division I Basketball Tournament. The visible trusses at the top of the building near the U.S. Bank sign are also sometimes lit in germane colors to signify events such as holidays. In the week leading up to the 2007–08 NFC Championship Game they were lit in green and yellow in tribute to the Green Bay Packers. This was done again during the week leading up to the Packers appearance against the Chicago Bears in the 2010 NFC Championship Game on January 16, 2011, in Chicago, Illinois.

In November 2023, Baird began to replace two of the four signs that previously said U.S. Bank to Baird. The two signs that said Baird are on the north and south sides, while the other signs on the east and west sides remain as U.S. Bank.

The U.S. Bank Center is professionally managed by Hines as of November 2024.

== Architecture ==
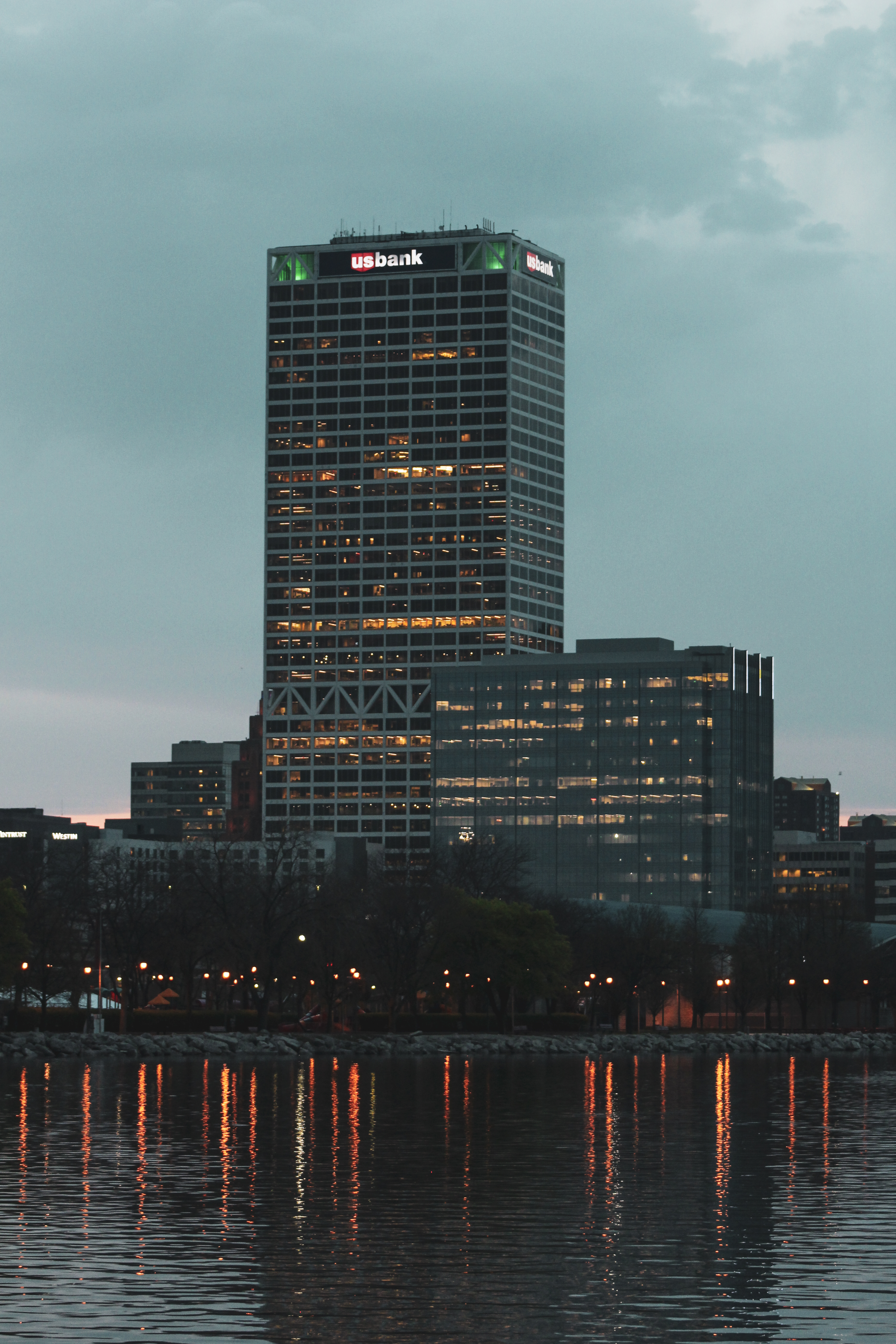
The U.S. Bank Center and 833 East Michigan pictured at dusk from Lake Michigan

Located on East Wisconsin Avenue in Downtown, Milwaukee, Wisconsin, U.S. Bank Center comprises a 42-story, 601-foot (183 m) office tower designed by Bruce Graham and James DeStefano of the Chicago office of Skidmore, Owings & Merrill. The U.S. Bank Center covers a full block, between North Cass and Van Buren Streets, and East Michigan Street and East Wisconsin Avenue. The tower features a steel frame sheathed with a white aluminum and glass facade.

Structurally, U.S. Bank Center uses a belt truss system engineered by both Graham and Fazlur Rahman Khan. Using elements similar to those used in one of Khan's prior works (the BHP House, since renamed 140 William Street, in Melbourne, Australia), the three diagonal belt trusses provide for a dramatic contrast with the vertical facade in serving both structural and aesthetic purposes.

The U.S. Bank Center's exterior was left unchanged from its completion in 1973, through the 1999 merger with Mercantile Bancorporation. At that time, Firstar announced that signs would be attached to the top of the building. Critics argued the green advertising signs on all four sides of the building's top story, in place of the original aluminum elements that were subsequently recycled, disrupted the look of the building's signature diagonal trusses. By 2002, the signs were replaced with opaque, white ones to reflect the merger with U.S. Bancorp.

In 2013, they were replaced with blue, energy-saving LED signs. In 2023 and 2024, the existing signs were replaced with new Baird signage on the north and south elevations, and U.S. Bank replaced their previously blue signs with a new, white background sign on the East and West elevations.

== Peregrine Falcons ==
In July 1987, a hacking box was installed outside the 41st floor to allow peregrine falcons to nest as part of the Wisconsin Department of Natural Resources (DNR) Peregrine Falcon Recovery Plan. The plan was initiated in an effort to reintroduce peregrines within Wisconsin as their whole population in the state were killed off due to the widespread use of DDT in agriculture following World War II. The location atop the building was chosen as it created an environment where the birds were less susceptible to disease and their natural predators. One year after the project was initiated, a pair of peregrine chicks were hatched atop the tower. The hatchlings were the first born in the wild within Wisconsin since the 1960s. Since the launch of the program in 1987, 67 falcons have fledged from the hacking box atop the tower.

== Observation deck ==
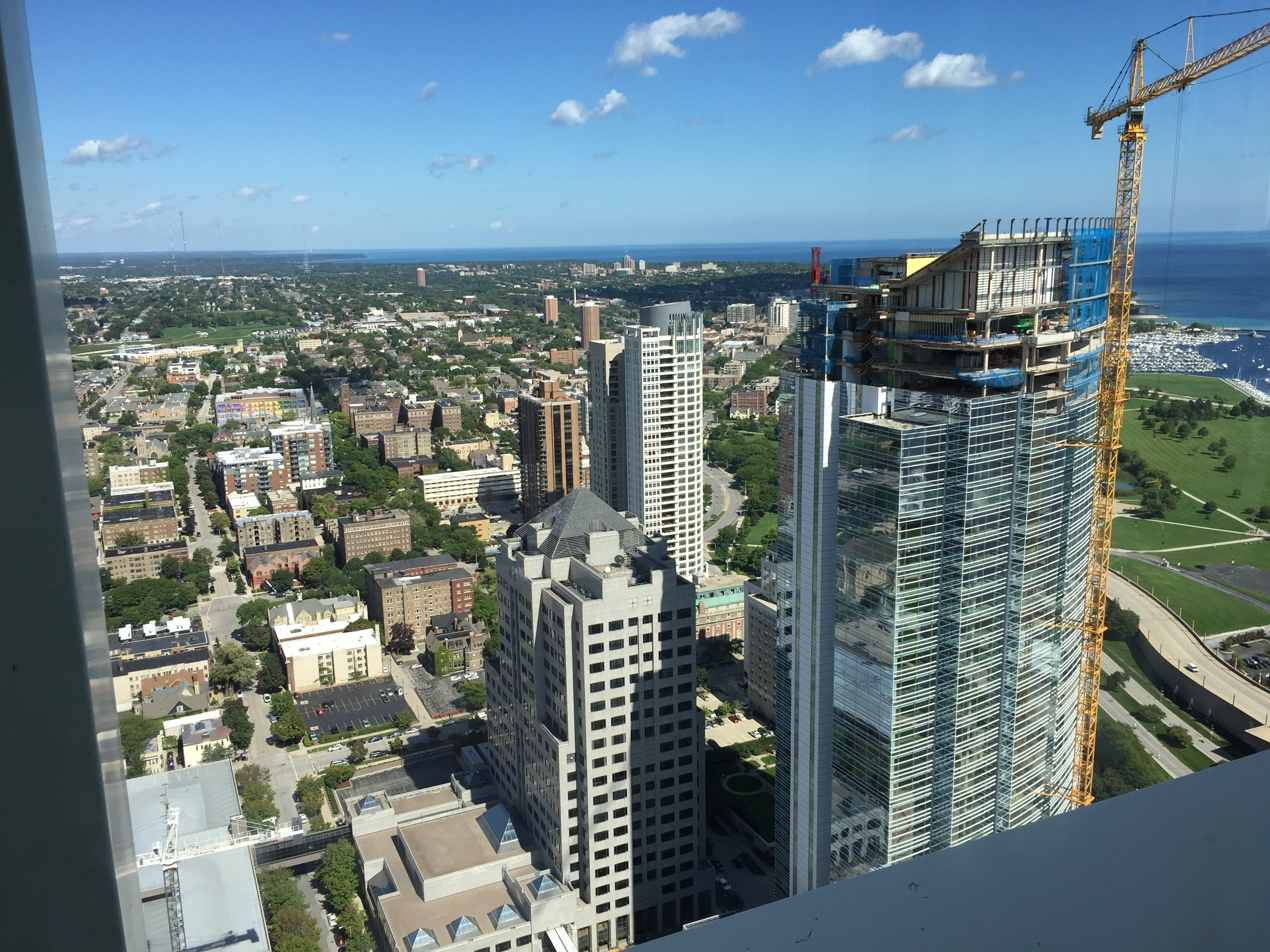
View towards the northeast from the top floor, with the Northwestern Mutual Tower and Commons under construction in 2016

The building was constructed with an observation deck on the 41st floor. Visitors were initially allowed to visit it, as it was the site for the New Year's Eve event "Firstar Eve". The observation deck was closed to the public in 1991 due to access being limited through mechanical or tenant occupied areas. In 2011, the observation deck was again opened to the public during the first Doors Open Milwaukee event.

== See also ==
- List of tallest buildings in Milwaukee
- List of tallest buildings in Wisconsin
- List of tallest buildings by U.S. state

== Bibliography ==
- Blanc, Alan; McEvoy, Michael & Plank, Roger (1993). Architecture and Construction in Steel. Taylor & Francis. ISBN 0-419-17660-8.
- Khan, Yasmin Sabina (2004). Engineering Architecture: The Vision of Fazlur R. Khan. W. W. Norton & Company. ISBN 0-393-73107-3.

Records
| Preceded by Milwaukee City Hall | Tallest Building in Wisconsin; 1973—Present; 183m | Incumbent |
