= Wisconsin Tower =

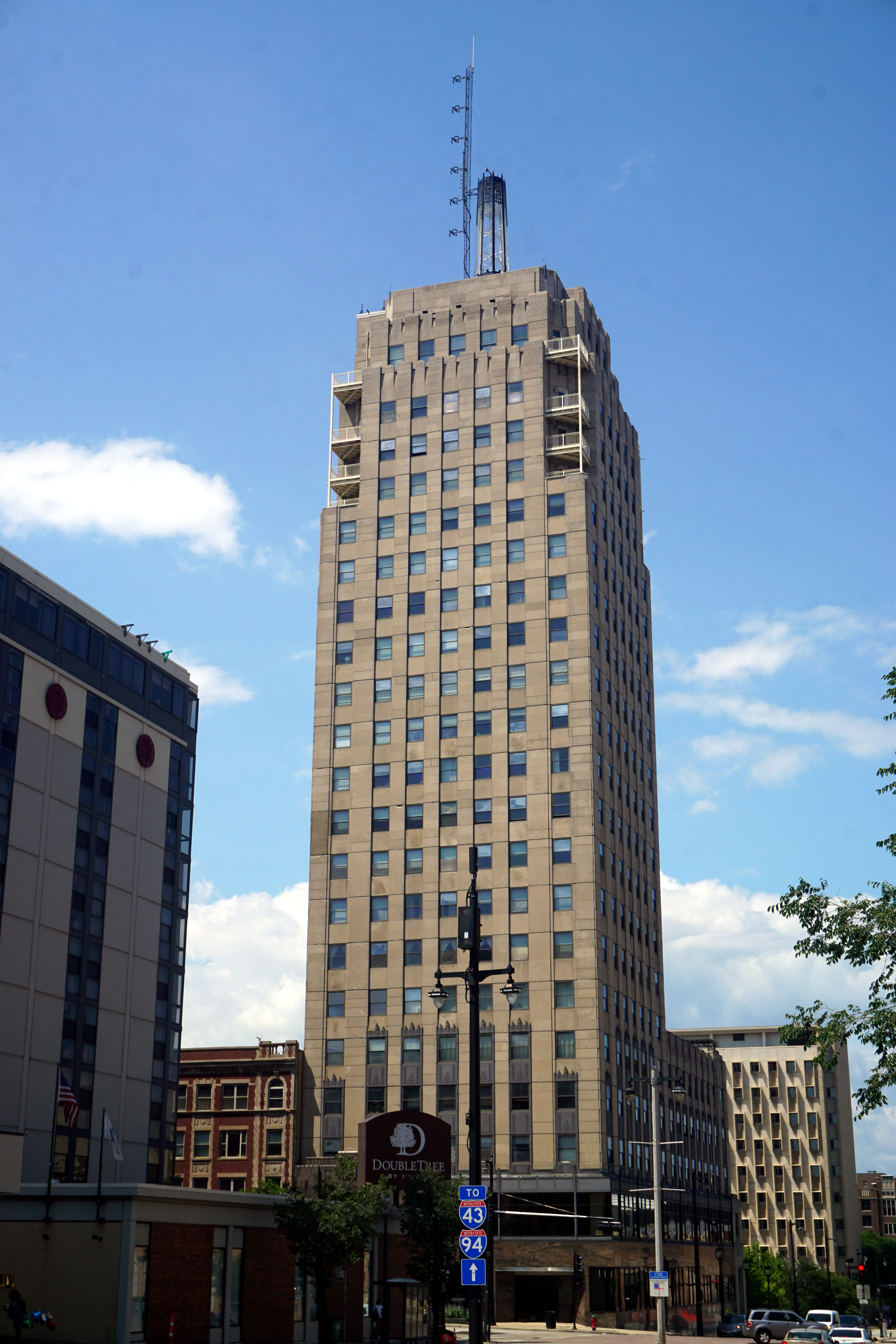
- Wisconsin Tower seen from 6th Street
- Former names: Mariner Tower

General information
- Type: Skyscraper
- Architectural style: Art Deco
- Location: Milwaukee, Wisconsin, USA, 606 West Wisconsin Avenue
- Coordinates: 43.0390656°N 87.9193448°W
- Construction started: 1929
- Completed: 1930
- Renovated: 2005 (Completed 2006)

Height
- Height: 280 feet (85 m)

Technical details
- Floor count: 22
- Lifts/elevators: 2 (Originally 4)

Design and construction
- Architecture firm: Weary & Alford Company

Other information
- Parking: 2 Floors Underground
- Public transit: MCTS

The Wisconsin Tower, or 606 Building, is a 22-story, 280-foot-tall (85 m) Art Deco high-rise building in Milwaukee, Wisconsin. It was completed in 1930, and was the second tallest building in Milwaukee at the time of its completion. It would be surpassed by the Chase Tower in 1961. Originally the building was an office tower, but it was purchased and redeveloped into 74 condominiums in 2005. The renovation was completed the following year. The tower is located at 606 West Wisconsin Avenue.

== History ==
The Wisconsin Tower is a prime example of Art Deco architecture, and was built from 1929 to 1930, in the middle of the Art Deco era. It was designed by the Chicago architectural firm of Weary & Alford Company. The firm designed several Midwest office buildings and banks during this period which had similar features–skyscrapers with Bedford stone exterior and inset upper floors.

The brown marble front entrance, surrounding a grillwork of birds and flowers, leads to a lobby, almost all of which is original. The lobby walls are Levanto Italian marble. The elevator doors, elevator signals, and directory are examples of Art Deco design. The metal grillwork continues along the south and east sides of the outside of the building. All of the grillwork was designed by Edwin Weary, one of the architects, who also designed the frieze on the Milwaukee Journal Sentinel Building located on State Street.

The Wisconsin Tower was known as the Mariner Tower until 1939. The original name came from the developer, John W. Mariner. The land upon which The Wisconsin Tower was built was originally purchased by John W. Mariner from brothers Thomas and John E. Saxe–famous Milwaukee theatre moguls. Mariner owned several businesses related to real estate, and died several months before completion of the Tower. The name change came about because another Downtown building known as the Mariner was frequently confused with the Mariner Tower.

At a height of 280 feet, and 22 floors (the 22nd floor contains equipment and the two floors below ground are used for resident parking). The Wisconsin Tower was the tallest skyscraper built in Milwaukee during the 1920s. The steel tower on the rooftop accounts for about 35 feet of the total building's height. It was originally enclosed in glass and used as an airplane beacon. Now the structure is purely decorative and is illuminated at night by LED lights. There is a second steel tower on the rooftop now, that is not included in the building's height.

Although there has been speculation that the steel tower's original purpose was for blimp landings, there is no proof. The rumor may have come about in part because of the building's resemblance to the Empire State Building, which has a similar structure that was actually built as a landing platform. As a matter of fact, there are two other buildings built by the architectural firm Weary & Alford which resemble closely the Wisconsin Tower, see First National Center (Oklahoma City).

When it was completed in late 1930, the Mariner Tower's four elevators were state of the art, and prominently mentioned in news stories. They had electronically controlled stopping and leveling mechanisms, which meant elevator operators no longer had to use finesse and guesswork to stop the car at the correct spot. Original tenants of the Tower included commercial and medical offices, stores, and a restaurant. For much of the past, medical and law offices occupied most of the space. In 1971, Mariner Realty sold the building to Towne Realty. By the early 1990s, with the downturn of the Westown neighborhood, only a third of The Wisconsin Tower's space was leased. From 1994 until 2002, Milwaukee Business Training Institute relocated to this site and leased four floors of the building. For a time, the penthouse on the 21st floor was occupied by the popular Milwaukee rock and roll radio station FM 93 WQFM, which went off the air in 1996. The Tower also housed a Milwaukee Police Station and later, the Public Service Ambassadors from their inception in 1999 until 2003. In 2004, developer Dave Leszczynski, owner of City Real Estate Development, bought the building and began the condominium renovation you see today. Building History is from: Wisconsin Tower Condominium Resident's Handbook

== See also ==
- List of tallest buildings in Milwaukee

Records
Preceded by Hilton Milwaukee City Center	2nd Tallest building in Milwaukee; 1930—1961; 85m	Succeeded by Chase Tower
