= Yucca Grove, California =

Unincorporated community in California, United States

Yucca Grove
- Unincorporated community
- Location in California Yucca Grove (the United States)
- Coordinates: 35°24′9″N 115°47′32″W
- Country: United States
- State: California
- County: San Bernardino
- Elevation: 4,131 ft (1,259 m)
- Time zone: UTC−8 (Pacific Time Zone)
  - Summer (DST): UTC−7 (PDT)
- Area codes: 442/760
- GNIS feature ID: 1661717

Yucca Grove is an unincorporated community in San Bernardino County, in the U.S. state of California.
