= Dudley Tower =

Coordinates: 44.9611°N 89.6305°W

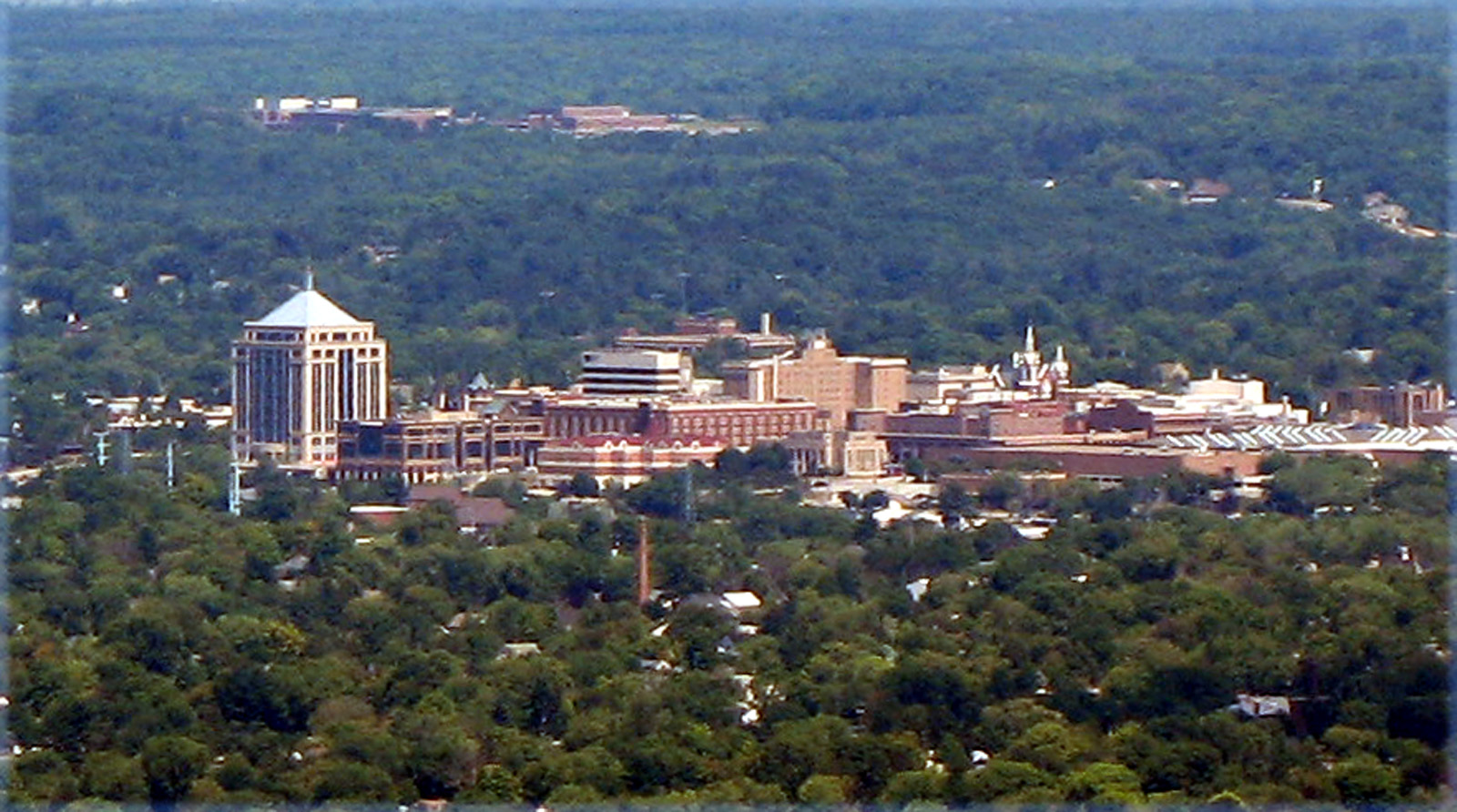
- Downtown Wausau, with Dudley Tower visible on the left
- Interactive map of the Dudley Tower area
- Alternative names: First Wausau Tower

General information
- Status: Completed
- Type: Commercial Offices
- Location: 500 1st St #3,Wausau, Wisconsin
- Construction started: Spring 2006
- Completed: July 2007
- Owner: Dudley Investments, LLC

Height
- Architectural: 241 ft (73 m)
- Roof: 199 ft (61 m)

Technical details
- Floor count: 11
- Floor area: 160,000 sq ft (14,900 m^{2})

Design and construction
- Architects: Preforma, Inc
- Main contractor: Miron Construction

Other information
- Public transit access: Metro Ride

Website
- dudleytower.com

Dudley Tower, also known as First Wausau Tower, is a high-rise building located in downtown Wausau, Wisconsin. Sitting on the left bank of the Wisconsin River, it is the most prominent building in the Wausau city skyline. First Wausau Tower is the tallest commercial building in Wisconsin outside of Milwaukee.

Currently, First Wausau Tower is occupied by Ruder Ware, WoodTrust, CGI, and Miron Construction. Architect, Performa, Inc, designed the building to be a "state-of-the-art office building features amenities that go beyond building codes, including security systems with proximity card readers; wireless, cable, or satellite communications infrastructure, an advanced heating and cooling system, and a lower level, climate-controlled executive parking facility." Dudley Tower's offices can hold, in total, about 500 employees. The building is also host to WAOW-TV's Dudley Tower Skycam.

The building has won two awards: The Daily Reporter - Top Projects in Wisconsin - 2007 and the WRMCA Concrete Design Award - 2007.

Dudley Tower's builder, Miron Construction, created a time-lapse video showing its construction phase during 2006 & 2007.
