= Northwestern Mutual Tower and Commons =

Office building in Milwaukee, Wisconsin

Northwestern Mutual Tower
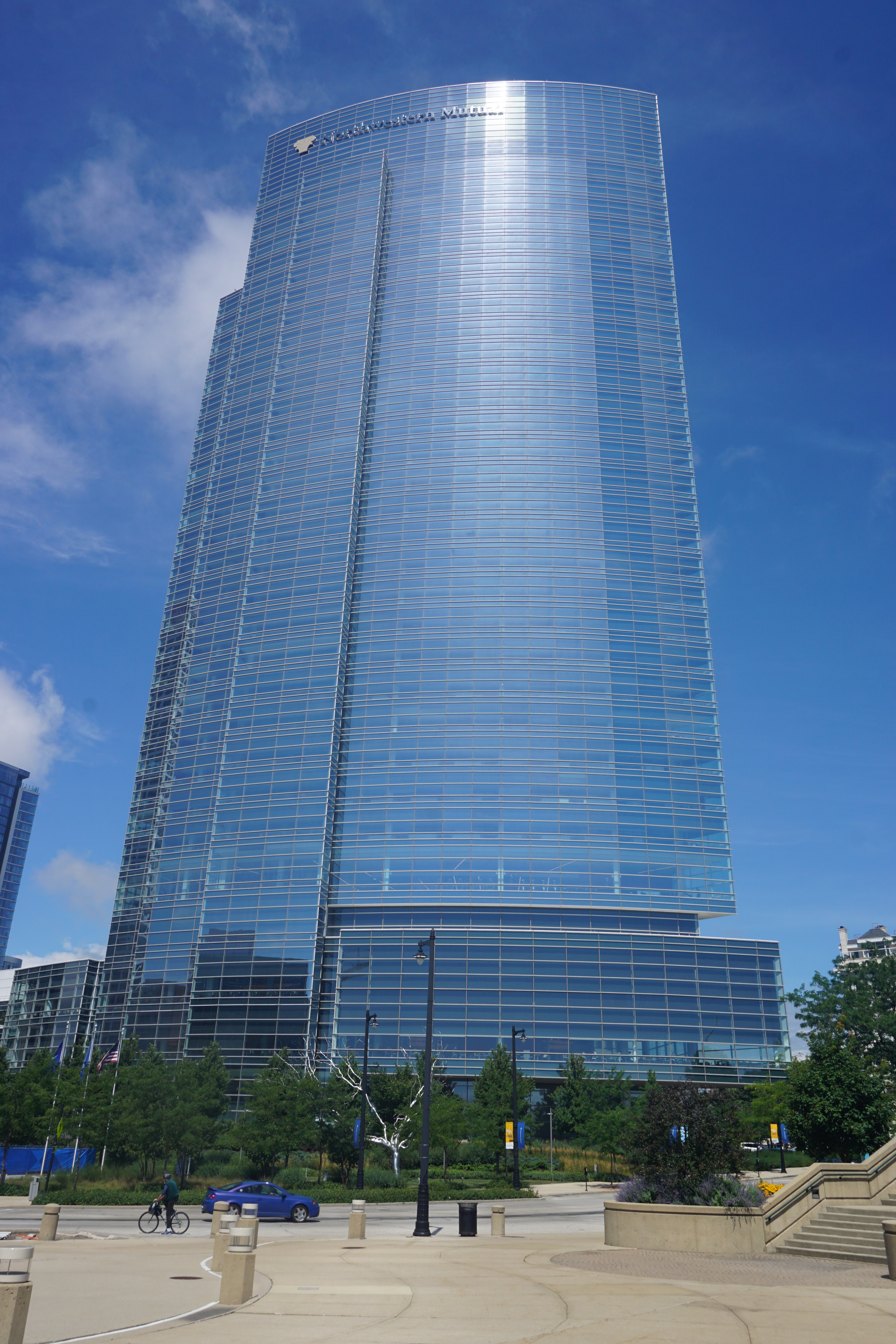

General information
- Status: Completed
- Location: Milwaukee, Wisconsin
- Coordinates: 43°02′24″N 87°54′04″W
- Groundbreaking: August 26, 2014
- Completed: August 21, 2017
- Client: Northwestern Mutual

Height
- Height: 554 feet (169 m)

Technical details
- Floor count: 32
- Floor area: 1,100,000 ft^{2} (100,000 m^{2})

Design and construction
- Architect: Pickard Chilton

Other information
- Public transit: MCTS

The Northwestern Mutual Tower and Commons is a 554-foot, 32-story skyscraper located at 805 East Mason Street in Milwaukee, Wisconsin. The building was designed by architecture firm Pickard Chilton. On September 25, 2013, Northwestern Mutual unveiled the design for its new office tower. The company's former 16-story building was demolished to make room for the new tower. The new tower was completed in 2017 at an estimated cost of $450 million. The grand opening was on August 21, 2017.

At 554 feet (169 m), the Northwestern Mutual Tower and Commons is the second-tallest building in Milwaukee.

In October 2015, Northwestern Mutual announced plans to build a 34-story residential tower with retail and parking in downtown Milwaukee. 7Seventy7 was completed in 2018.

== Gallery ==
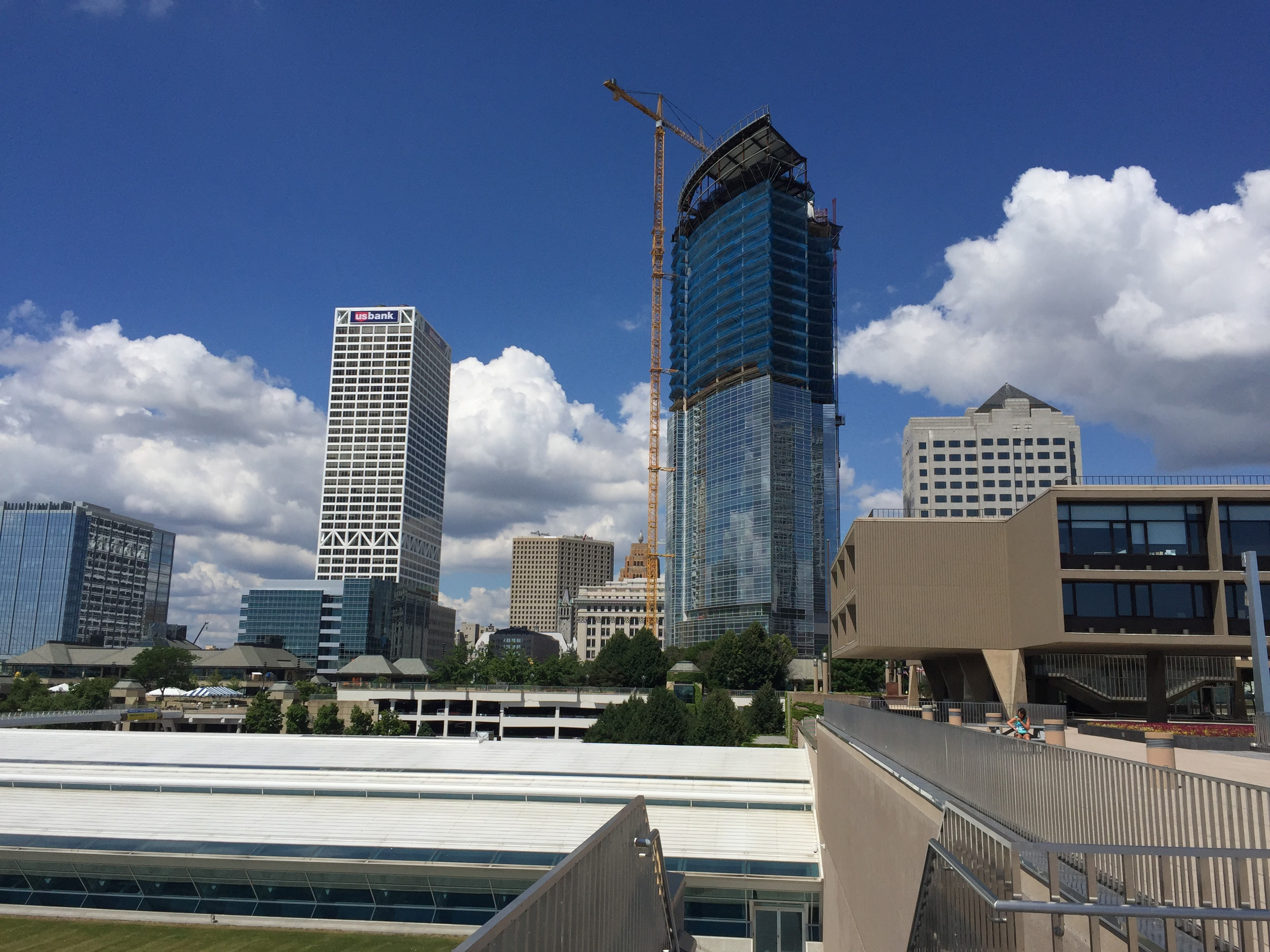
Under construction in 2016.

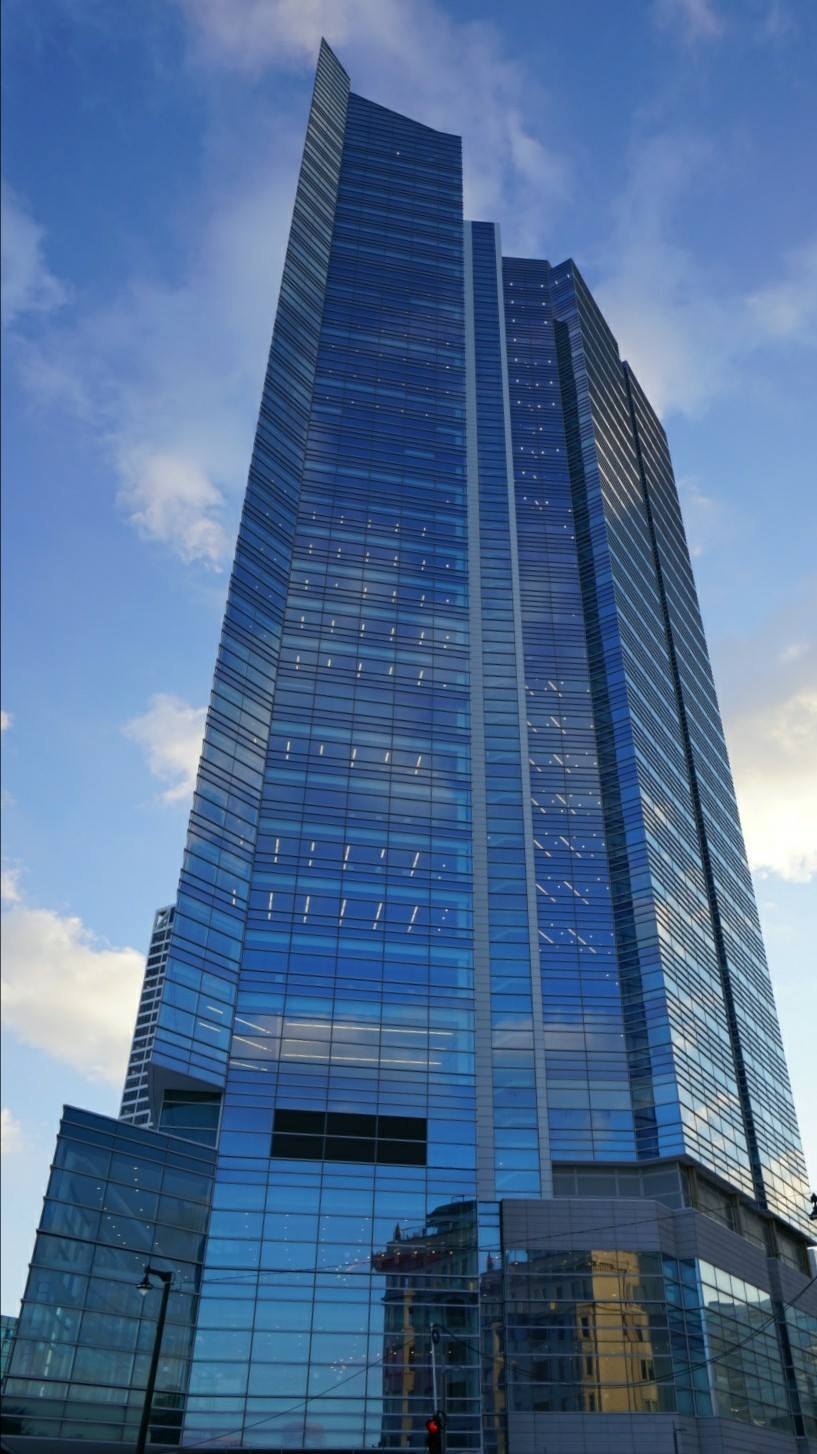
The northern face of the tower.

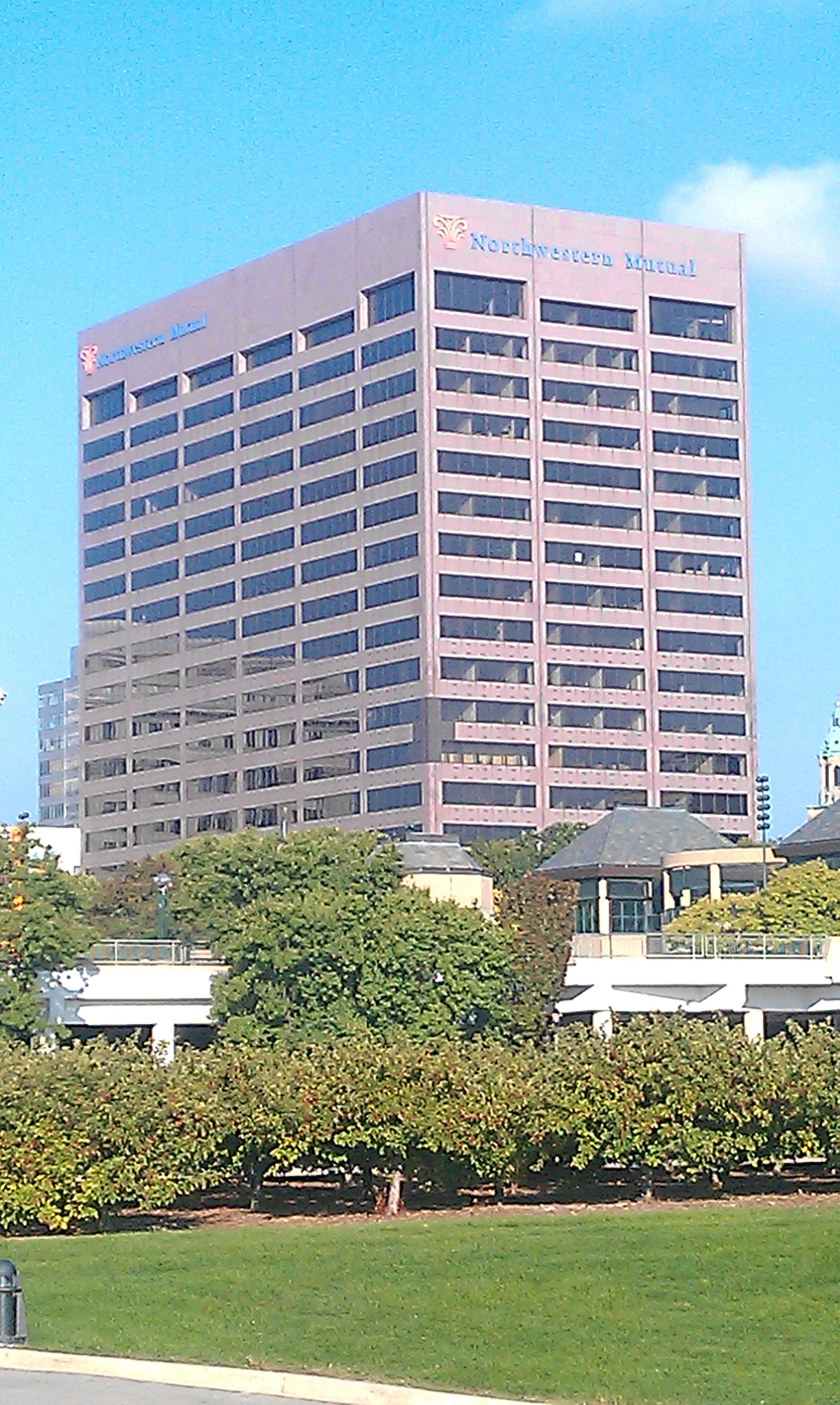
The East Tower was demolished in 2014.

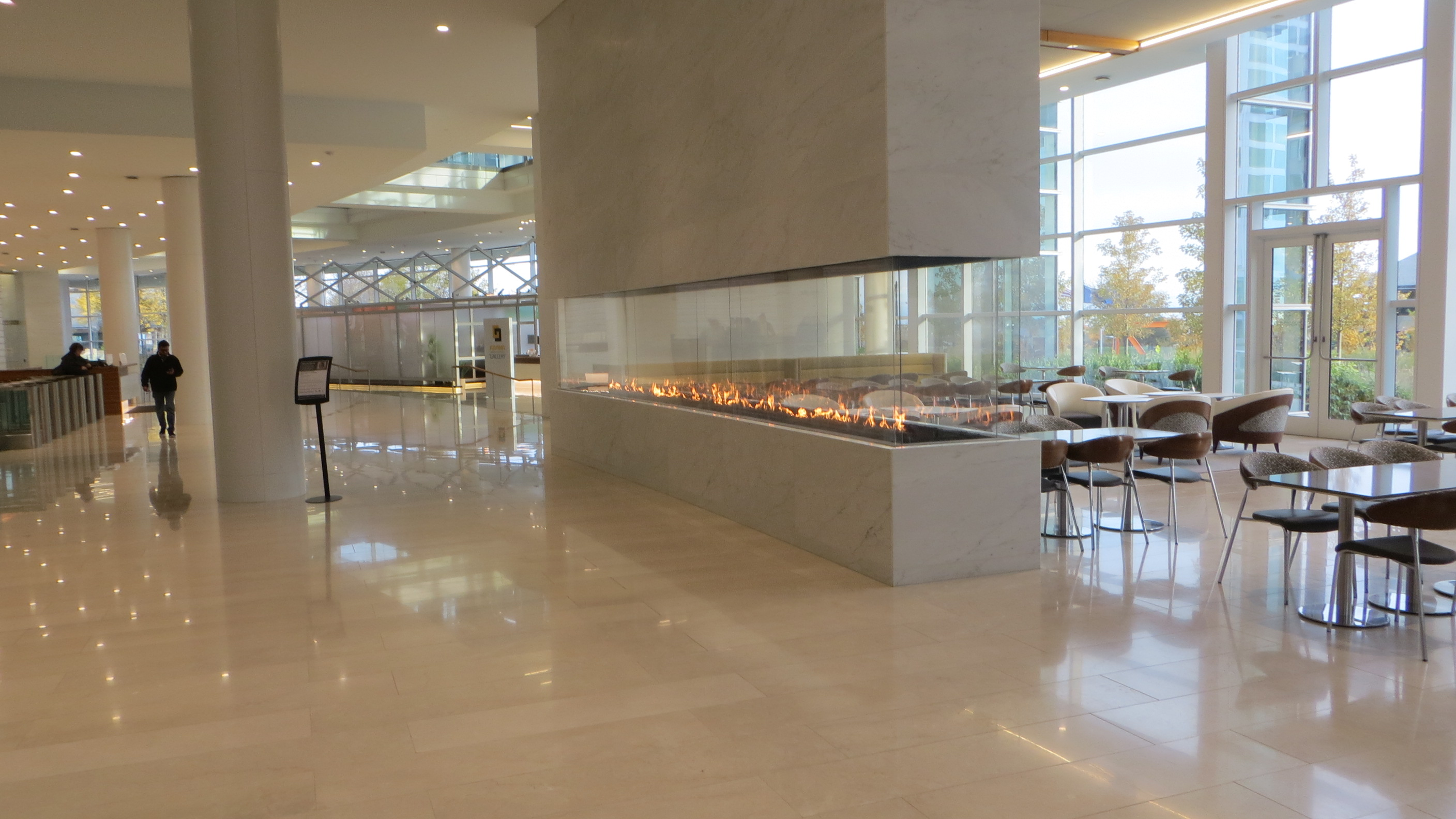
The lobby of the Tower.

== See also ==
- List of tallest buildings in Milwaukee
- List of tallest buildings in Wisconsin
- List of tallest buildings by U.S. state

Records
Preceded by 100 East Wisconsin	2nd Tallest building in Milwaukee; 2017—Present; 169m	Succeeded by Current holder
