= 7Seventy7 =

Residential high-rise in Milwaukee, Wisconsin

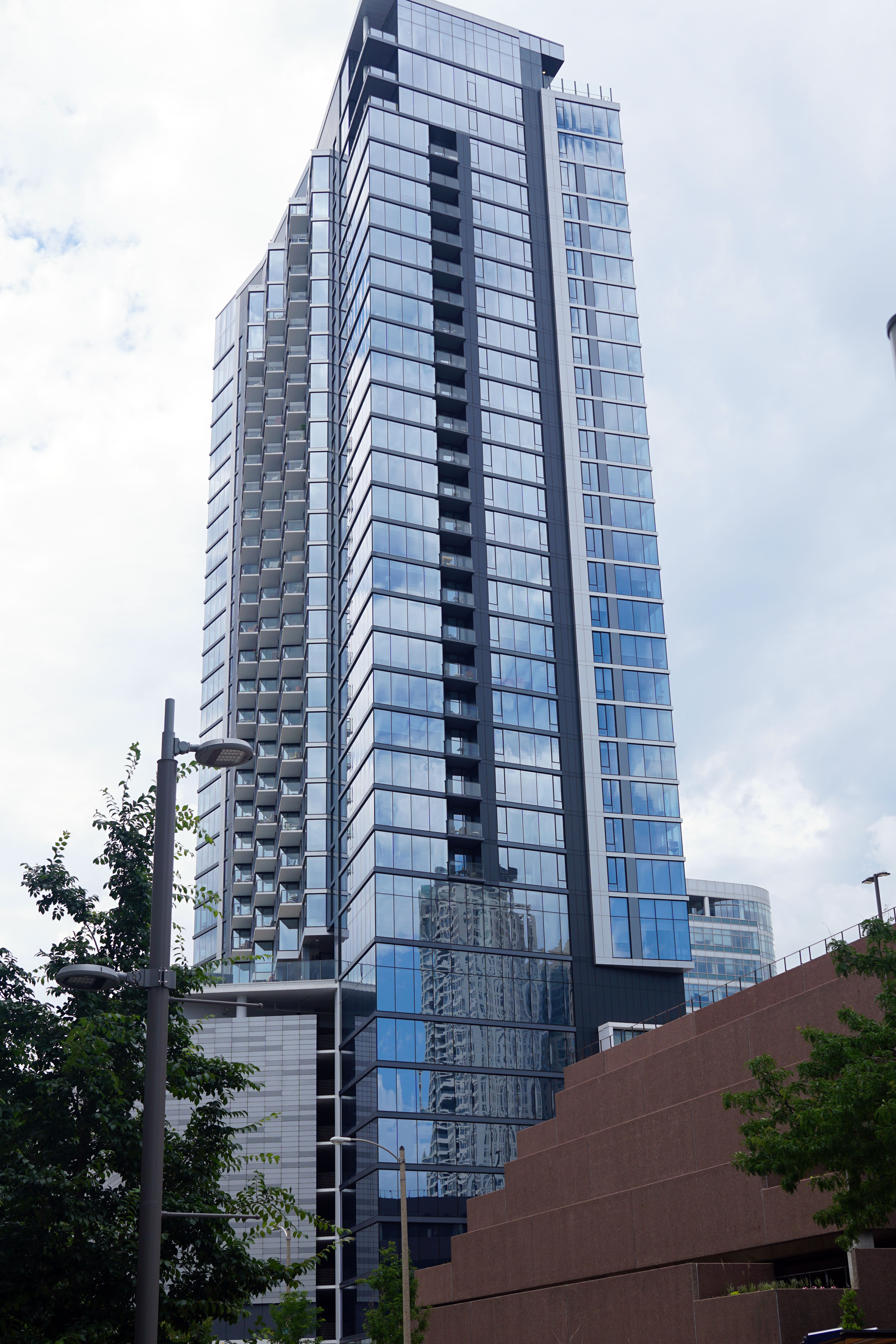
- Interactive map of the 7Seventy7 area
- Alternative names: Alternative name Northwestern Mutual Residential Tower

General information
- Status: Completed
- Architectural style: Modernism
- Location: Milwaukee, Wisconsin, 777 N Van Buren Street
- Coordinates: 43°2′26.15″N 87°54′12.91″W
- Construction started: March 2016
- Completed: August 2018
- Client: Northwestern Mutual
- Landlord: Bozzuto Management

Height
- Height: 387.00 feet (117.96 m)

Technical details
- Floor count: 35

Other information
- Number of rooms: 310 units
- Parking: 10 floors
- Public transit access: MCTS

Website
- live7seventy7.com

7Seventy7 is a 35 story apartment high rise commissioned by Milwaukee based Northwestern Mutual Life Insurance Company. The building was completed in 2018 and is located at 777 N. Van Buren St. in Milwaukee, Wisconsin.

== History ==
Northwestern Mutual Life has stated that the building will have 310 luxury apartments along with 14 penthouse apartments and more than 1300 parking spaces. In 2016 Northwestern revised their plan and added another floor to make the building 35 floors. The estimated cost of the project was 100 million dollars and the expected completion date was the spring of 2018. The goal of the company was to make an apartment building that felt more like a hotel. The 35 story building was completed in August 2018 it boasts a golf simulator, an outdoor pool, a gym. There are 24 floors of apartments and ten floors of parking.

== See also ==
- List of tallest buildings in Milwaukee
