= Milwaukee City Hall =

Building in Milwaukee, Wisconsin

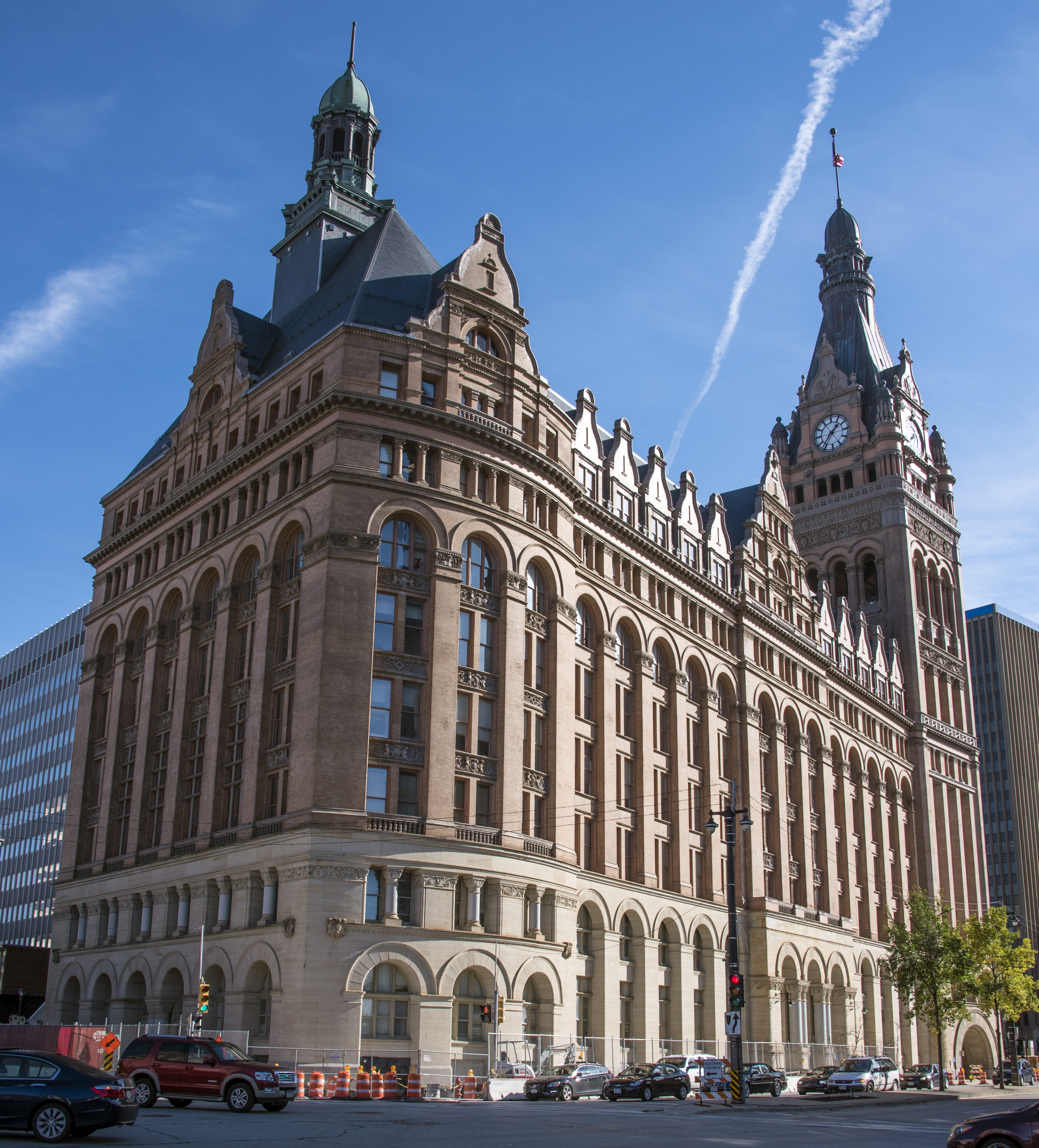
- Milwaukee City Hall in 2017

- Location within Wisconsin Location within the United States

Record height
- Tallest in Wisconsin from 1895 to 1973^{[I]}
- Preceded by: Pabst Building
- Surpassed by: U.S. Bank Center

General information
- Type: Municipal office
- Architectural style: Flemish Renaissance Revival
- Location: 200 E. Wells St. Milwaukee, United States
- Coordinates: 43.0417°N 87.9098°W
- Completed: 23 December 1895; 130 years ago

Height
- Height: 353 feet (393 including the clocktower and flagpole)

Technical details
- Floor count: 15

Other information
- Public transit: MCTS; The Hop
- Milwaukee City Hall
- U.S. National Register of Historic Places
- U.S. National Historic Landmark
- Location: 200 E. Wells St. Milwaukee, United States
- NRHP reference No.: 73000085

Significant dates
- Added to NRHP: March 14, 1973
- Designated NHL: April 5, 2005

Milwaukee City Hall is a skyscraper and town hall located in Milwaukee, Wisconsin, United States. Finished in 1895, it was at the time the tallest habitable building in the world, and it was Milwaukee's tallest building until completion of the First Wisconsin Center in 1973. It is a National Historic Landmark and is listed on the National Register of Historic Places.

== History ==
Milwaukee City Hall was designed by architect Henry C. Koch in the Flemish Renaissance Revival style, based on both German precedent and local examples, such as the Pabst Building. Due to Milwaukee's historic German immigrant population, many of the surrounding buildings mirror this design.

It stands 354 feet tall; 393 if you measure to the tip of the flagpole atop the clocktower.

City Hall was added to the National Register of Historic Places in 1973 and declared a National Historic Landmark in 2005.

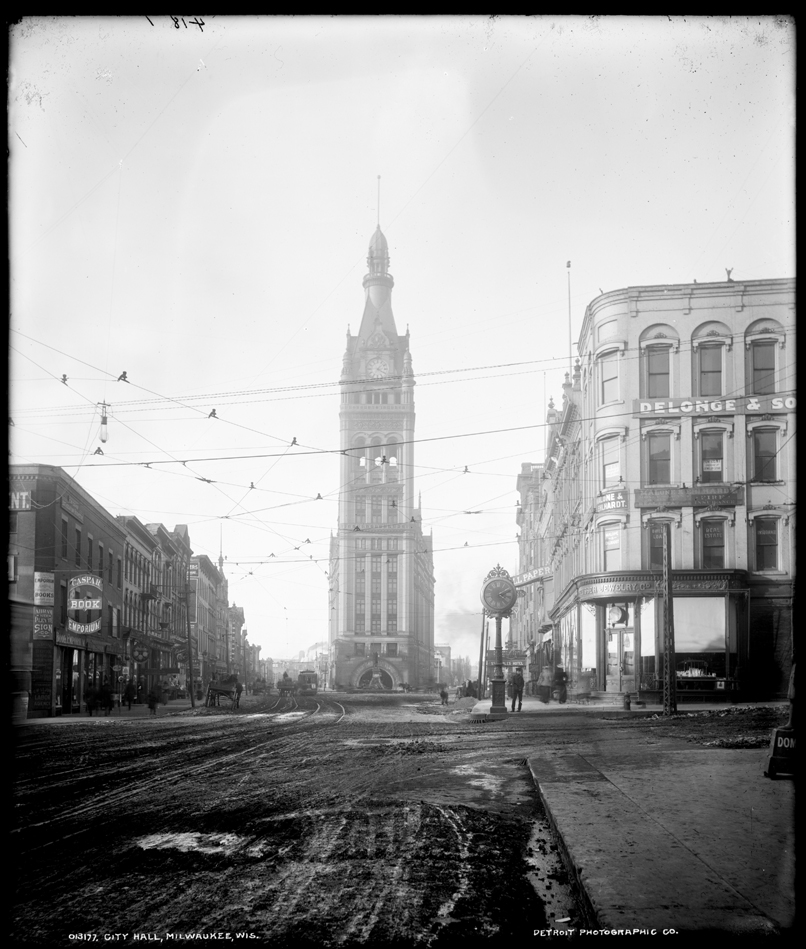
Milwaukee City Hall in 1901

=== Height record ===
When construction completed in 1895 until 1899, Milwaukee's city hall had a claim to be the tallest habitable building in the world.

Philadelphia City Hall, in operation since 1877 and fully completed in 1894, was technically taller (548 feet measured to its statued peak) throughout this time. But, its main structure topped off at 337 feet. The only other taller structure in the U.S. in 1895 was the 555-foot Washington Monument.

Milwaukee City Hall lost its record two years later, when the 367-foot Hamburg City Hall was inaugurated after 11 years of construction in Germany. By 1899, Milwaukee City Hall was no longer the tallest habitable building in the U.S., as the Park Row Building, a 391-foot New York City apartment skyscraper, became the world's tallest building upon completion in 1899.

== Description and features ==
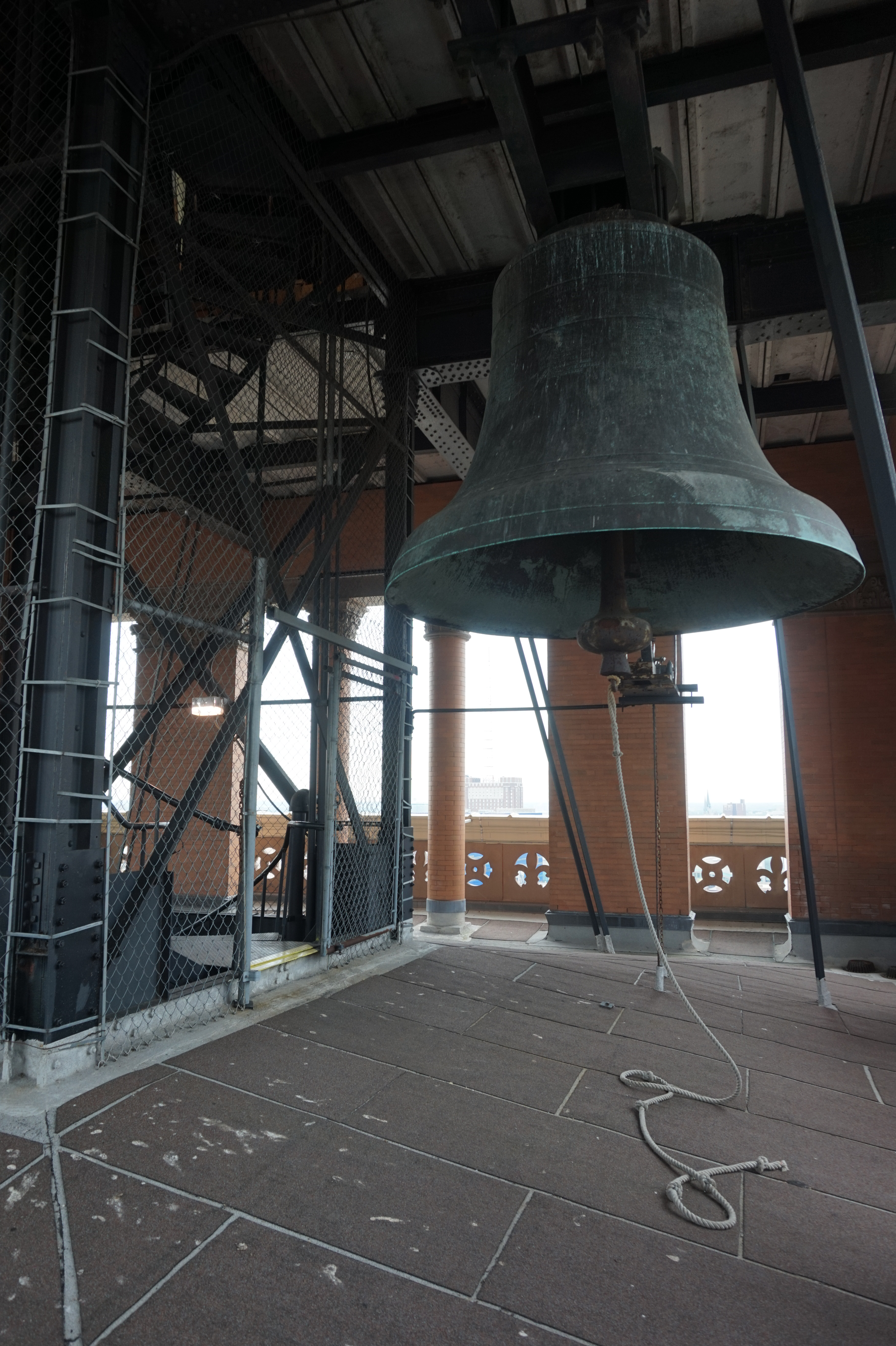
Solomon Juneau bell inside the building's tower

The foundation consists of 2,584 white pine piles that were driven into the marshy land surrounding the Milwaukee River.

From the foundation base, the main block of the building rises eight stories, with the massive tower at the end rising to 350 feet (110 m), with its clock faces flanked by four "beer stein" turrets, and topped by a copper-clad spire. The upper part of the tower was rebuilt after a fire in October 1929.

The interior features a 20-by-70-foot (6.1 m × 21.3 m) open atrium, which rises eight stories tall and is topped by a skylight.

The tower holds a single bourdon bell named after Solomon Juneau, Milwaukee's first mayor. It was designed and crafted by the Campbells, who were early pioneers in creating diving chambers and suits near the Great Lakes area during that time. The bell weighs 22,500 pounds (10,200 kg; 10.2 t) and was hoisted in the tower in 1896, first chiming on New Year's Eve.

== Renovation ==
From 2006 to 2008, the entire building was renovated, including a complete dis-assembly and reassembly of the bell tower, by J. P. Cullen & Sons, Inc., a construction manager and general contractor headquartered in Janesville, Wisconsin.

Before the restoration began, the bell was rung rarely because of seismic concerns, and in the last few years an assembly of scaffolds with protective coverings had been in place around the building to protect pedestrians from falling stone and brickwork.

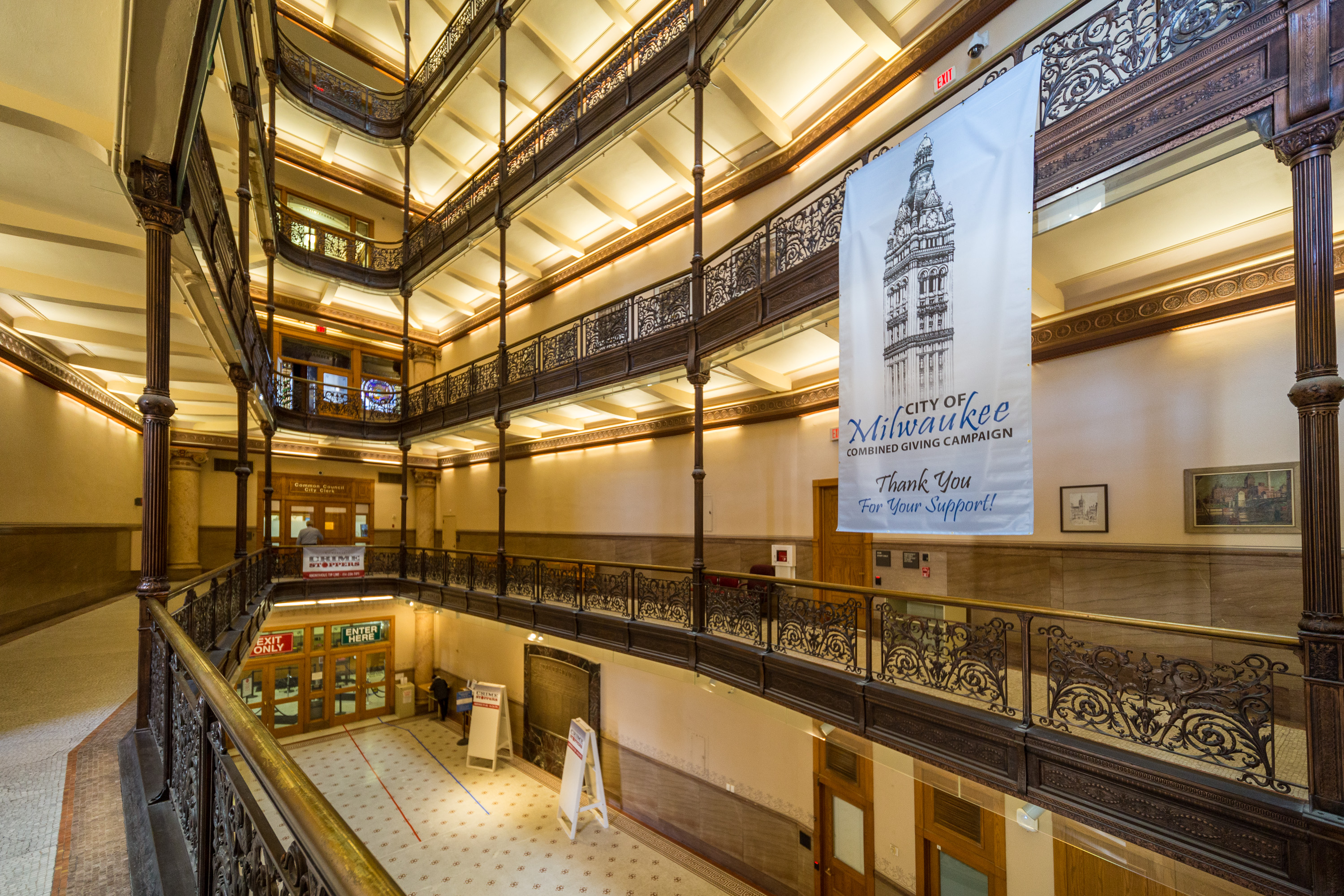
Milwaukee City Hall atrium, pictured in 2019

The quality of the US$60,000,000 restoration was the subject of a lawsuit filed by the City of Milwaukee in 2012 against various parties involved in the work.

== Transportation ==
City Hall is currently served by the Hop streetcar. Additionally, Milwaukee County Transit System routes 15, 18, and 57, as well as the GreenLine bus, serve City Hall.

Preceding station	The Hop	Following station
Wisconsin Avenue toward Intermodal Station	M-Line	Cathedral Square toward Burns Commons
Wisconsin Avenue toward Historic Third Ward	L-Line	Wisconsin Avenue One-way operation

== Promotions ==
City Hall was the marketing symbol of Milwaukee until the completion of the Calatrava wing of the Milwaukee Art Museum in 2001, but the bell tower continues to be used as a municipal icon and in some traffic and parking signs. Formerly the tower's front three sides were secondarily used as a lighted marquee, using three tiers of letters with various messages to welcome visitors, conventions and events, along with featuring messages timed to a holiday or achievement. An image of the City Hall marquee containing Welcome Milwaukee Visitors was one of the iconic images of the opening sequence for locally-set sitcom, Laverne & Shirley. The marquee was removed in 1988, and its letters were donated to the Milwaukee Institute of Art and Design in 2012.

== See also ==
- List of skyscrapers
- List of tallest buildings in Milwaukee
- List of tallest structures built before the 20th century

Records
Preceded by Pabst Building	Tallest Building in Wisconsin; 1895–1973; 108m	Succeeded by U.S. Bank Center
Preceded by Chase Tower	2nd Tallest building in Milwaukee; 1973–1985; 108m	Succeeded by 411 East Wisconsin Center
