= Youngstown, California =

Unincorporated community in California, United States

Youngstown
- Unincorporated community
- Location in California Youngstown (the United States)
- Coordinates: 38°10′26″N 121°14′35″W
- Country: United States
- State: California
- County: San Joaquin
- Elevation: 66 ft (20 m)
- Time zone: UTC−8 (Pacific Time Zone)
  - Summer (DST): UTC−7 (PDT)
- Area codes: 209
- GNIS feature ID: 1660221

Youngstown is an unincorporated community in San Joaquin County, in the U.S. state of California.
