= Yankee Hill, Tuolumne County, California =

Unincorporated community in California, United States

Yankee Hill
- Unincorporated community
- Location in California Yankee Hill (the United States)
- Coordinates: 38°2′23″N 120°22′41″W
- Country: United States
- State: California
- County: Tuolumne
- Elevation: 2,247 ft (685 m)
- Time zone: UTC−8 (Pacific Time Zone)
  - Summer (DST): UTC−7 (PDT)
- Area codes: 209
- GNIS feature ID: 269332

Yankee Hill is an unincorporated community in Tuolumne County, in the U.S. state of California.
