= University Club Tower (Milwaukee) =

Coordinates: 43.0422°N 87.8996°W

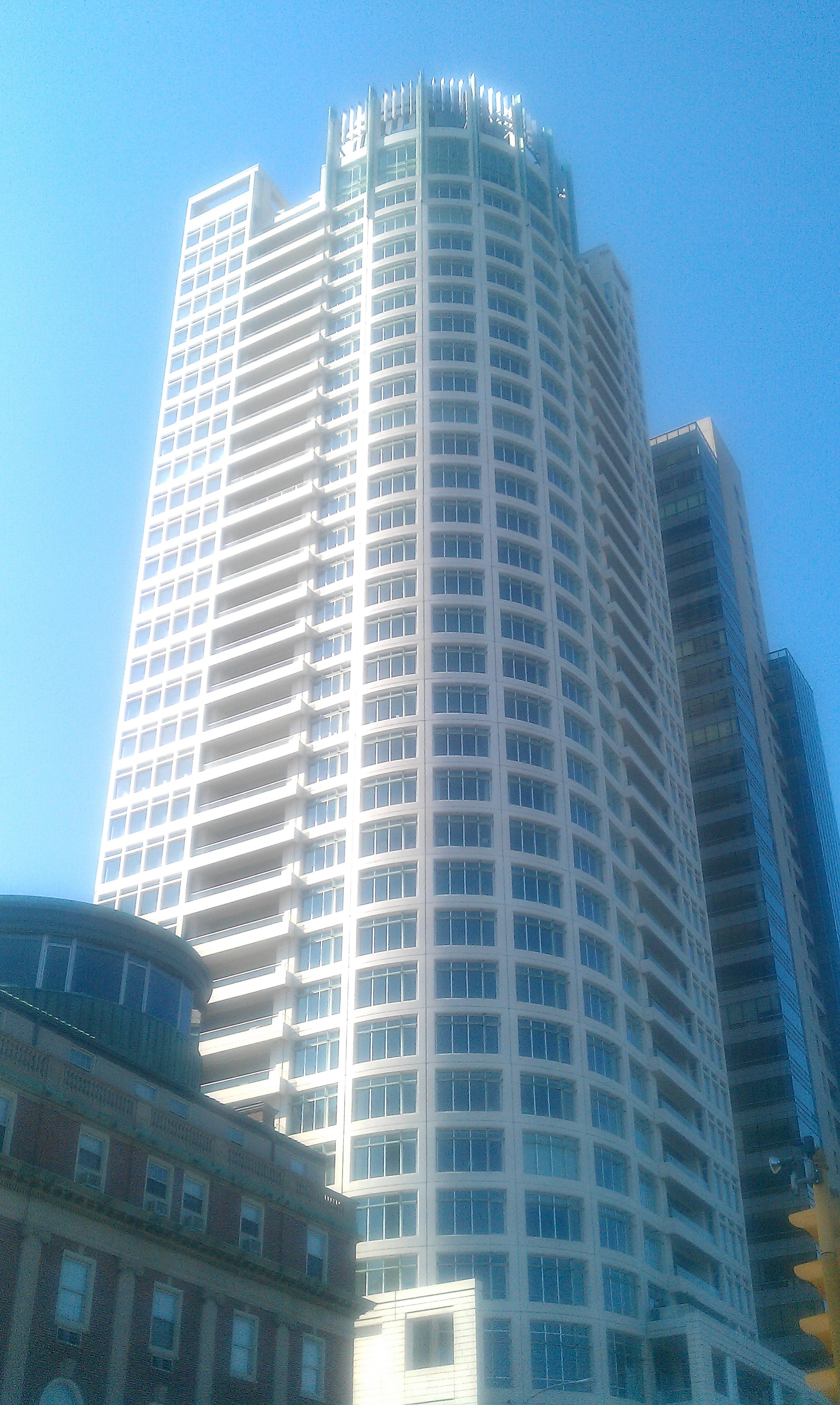

General information
- Type: residential
- Location: 825 N Prospect Ave Milwaukee, Wisconsin, United States
- Completed: 2007

Height
- Roof: 136 m (446 ft)
- Top floor: 36

Technical details
- Floor count: 36

Design and construction
- Architect(s): Skidmore, Owings and Merrill
- Developer: Mandel Group
- Structural engineer: Skidmore, Owings and Merrill
- Main contractor: J.H. Findorff & Sons

Other information
- Public transit access: MCTS

University Club Tower is a condominium tower in Milwaukee, Wisconsin. At 446 feet, it is the fifth tallest building in Wisconsin. It is located in Milwaukee's East Town neighborhood adjacent to the Lake Michigan shoreline.

The tower as originally planned was designed by Santiago Calatrava was to have only 25 stories. That plan was cancelled because of concerns about parking and its potential to obstruct views of the lake. However, the project was revived in June 2002 and ground was broken two years later. The Skidmore, Owings and Merrill designed building was developed by Milwaukee-based real-estate developer Mandel Group with J.H. Findorff & Sons serving as the general contractor.

The tower is built on land owned by the University Club of Milwaukee. It is adjacent connected to the club, and the tower's health center serves as the health center for club members. The building has a fitness center, indoor swimming pool, roof deck and a 106 space parking garage. University Club Tower contains 53 condominium residences on 37 floors.

Milwaukee radio host Mark Belling, real-estate developer Barry Mandel, and Marcus Corporation chairman Steve Marcus are residents of the building.

== See also ==
- List of tallest buildings in Milwaukee
