= Red Flower Rising =

Public artwork in Milwaukee, Wisconsin

- Artist: Richard Taylor (artist)
- Year: 2007
- Type: painted aluminum
- Dimensions: 430 cm × 180 cm × 180 cm (168 in × 72 in × 72 in)
- Location: Milwaukee; 43.035136°N 87.907582°W

Red Flower Rising is a public artwork by American artist Richard Taylor located outside the Milwaukee Public Market, on the corner of Broadway Street and East St. Paul Avenue in the Historic Third Ward in downtown Milwaukee, Wisconsin. The red painted aluminum sculpture was installed in 2007 in memory of Jeffry A. Posner.

== See also ==
- A Beam of Sun to Shake the Sky
- All in the Air at Once
- You Rise Above the World
