= A Beam of Sun to Shake the Sky =

Sculpture by Richard Taylor in Milwaukee, Wisconsin

- Artist: Richard Taylor (artist)
- Year: 2004
- Type: aluminum
- Dimensions: 430 cm × 120 cm × 210 cm (168 in × 48 in × 84 in)
- Location: Milwaukee Public Library; Milwaukee, Wisconsin; 43°2′24.27″N 87°55′20.55″W
- Owner: City of Milwaukee

A Beam of Sun to Shake the Sky is a public art work by American artist Richard Taylor, located in downtown Milwaukee, Wisconsin. The sculpture was created for the Central Milwaukee Public Library as part of the remodeling of the Wells Street entrance.

== Description ==
A Beam of Sun to Shake the Sky consists of two vertically oriented sculptures set upon massive granite pedestals in front of the library's glass facade. The sculptures appear to be made of bright red ribbon-like strips of painted aluminum that snake skyward. The individual strips each contain cut-out letters in a variety of fonts, languages, and cases. The twin forms are more dense at the bottom, and become lighter toward the top. The highest element on each side is a short, curved strip painted in gold leaf. With their wide bases that taper upward, the forms resemble red candles topped by gold flames. The sculptures are lit from below at night.

== See also ==
- Red Flower Rising
- All in the Air at Once
- You Rise Above the World
