= The Hop (streetcar) =

Streetcar service in Milwaukee, Wisconsin

Coordinates: 43°02′03″N 87°55′02″W

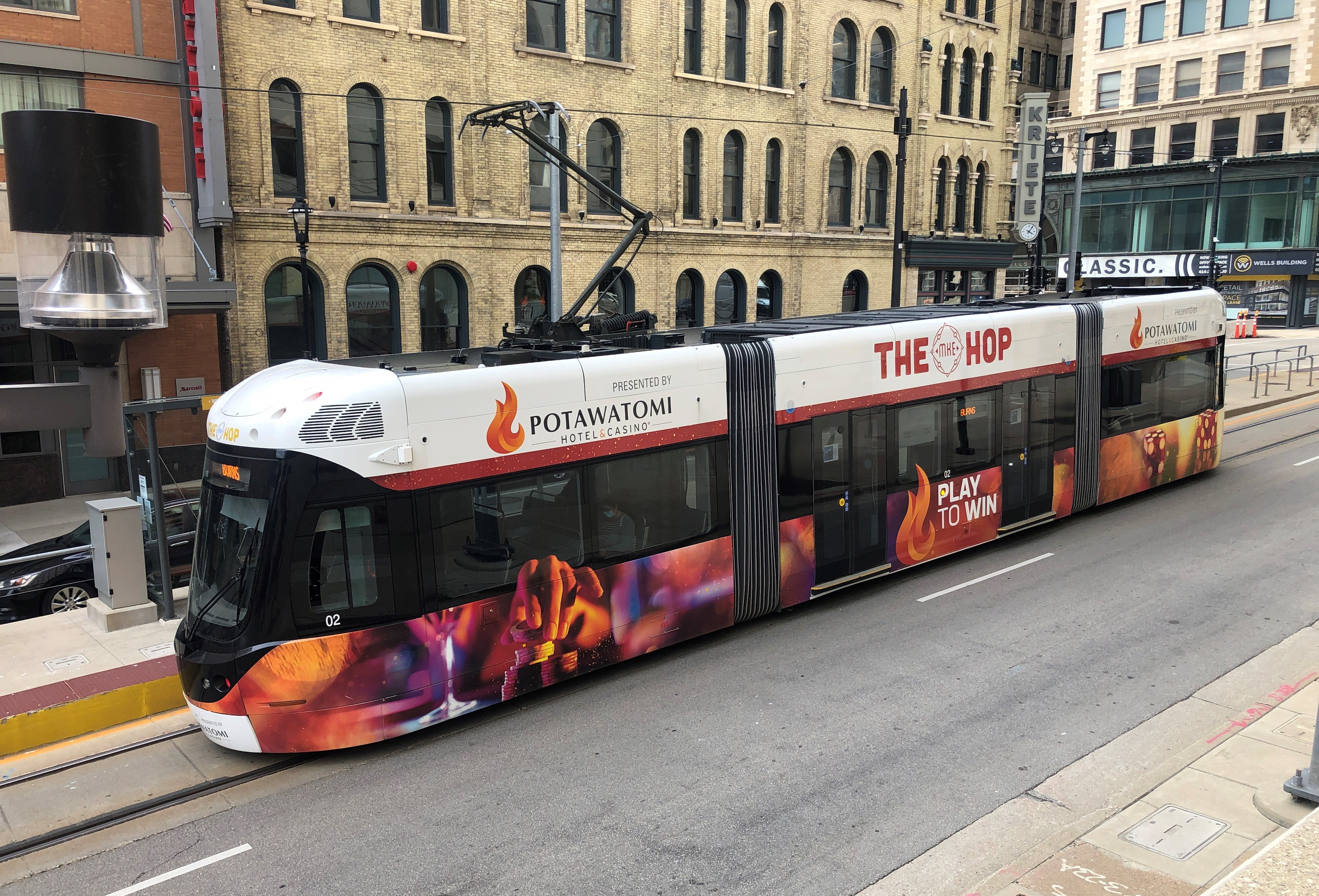
- The Hop streetcar at Wisconsin Avenue Northbound station

Operation
- Locale: Milwaukee, Wisconsin, U.S.
- Open: November 2, 2018
- Lines: 2
- Owner: City of Milwaukee
- Operator: Transdev

Infrastructure
- Track gauge: 4 ft 8 1/2 in (1,435 mm) standard gauge
- Electrification: Overhead line, 750 V DC
- Stock: 5 Brookville Liberty Modern Streetcars

Statistics
- Route length: 2.5 miles (4.0 km)
- Stops: 21
- 2,191 daily
Overview
M-Line highlighted in blue, L-Line highlighted in gold
Key
- Website: thehopmke.com

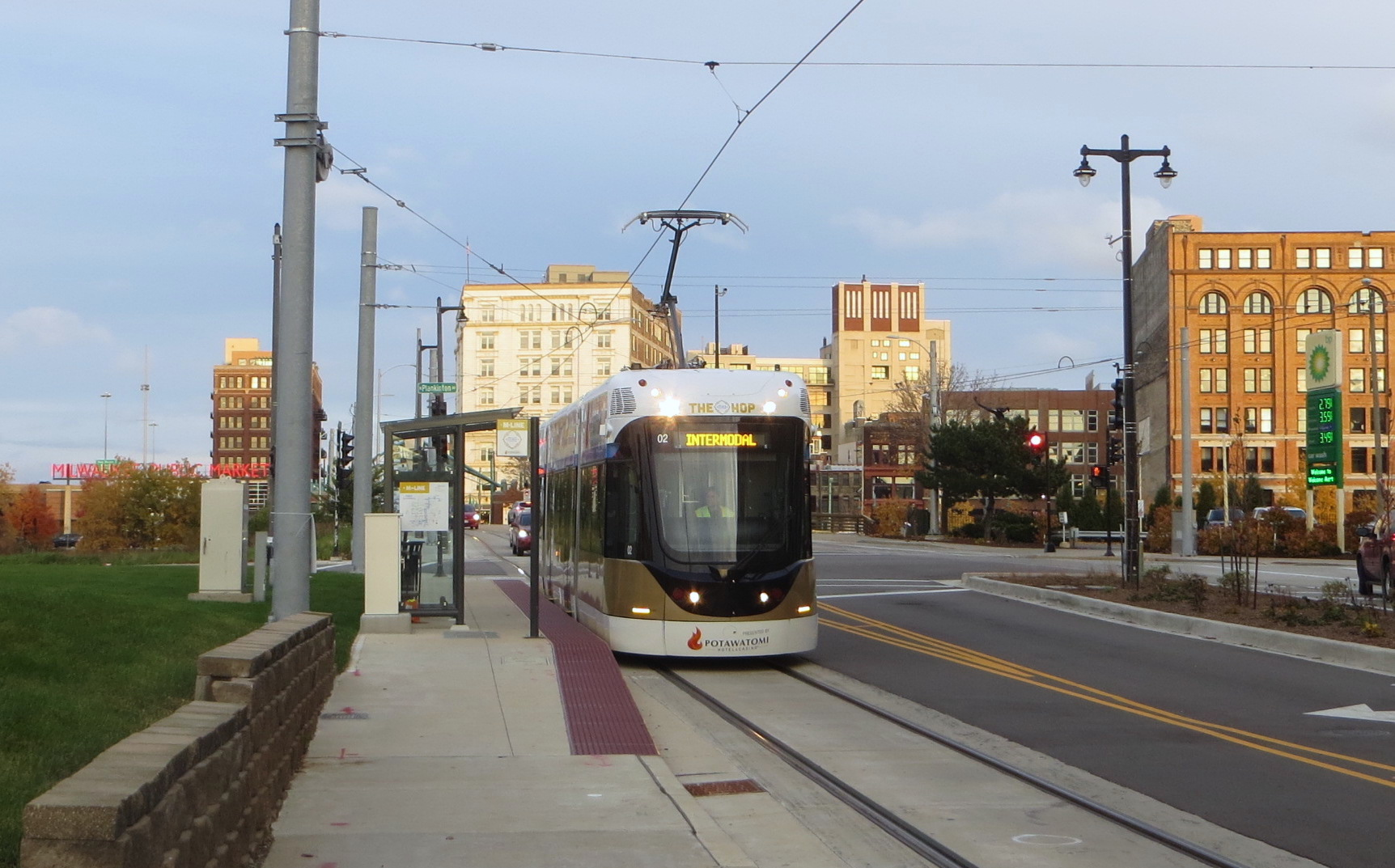
A Hop streetcar on St. Paul Avenue at Plankinton Avenue

The Hop, also known as the Milwaukee Streetcar, is a modern streetcar system in Milwaukee, Wisconsin. The system's 2.1-mile (3.4 km) original M-Line connects the Milwaukee Intermodal Station and Downtown to the Lower East Side and Historic Third Ward neighborhoods. On April 11, 2024, a 0.4-mile (640 m) Lakefront, or L-Line, to the nearly complete high-rise development The Couture, began offering full daily service. Additional extensions for new lines are currently in the planning stage. The system is owned by the city and operated by Transdev.

Construction of the system began in late 2016 and was completed in summer 2018. Service to the public began on November 2, 2018.

== History ==
=== Early Milwaukee streetcars ===
In 1860, Milwaukee opened the first line of its original streetcar system using horse-drawn streetcars. The system continued to grow in the late 19th century and into the early 20th century, culminating in a large network of electric streetcar lines.

After World War II, the federal government invested heavily in the development of an interconnected interstate highway system, and raised taxes on private railway and streetcar operators. This stimulated massive urban sprawl and car dependency to the detriment of public transport systems. Commenting on this trend, philosopher and planner Lewis Mumford said when the Interstate Highway Act passed that more damage would be done to American cities in the next 10 years than all the bombing the Germans did to European cities during World War II. On March 2, 1958, the city's last streetcar route was closed.

The Hop's construction came in the wake of a failed plan to build a light rail system in the Milwaukee area. In 1997, the region was awarded $289 million after local leaders created a plan to build a light rail system, expand Interstate 94, and increase bus service in Waukesha County. The system, if built, would have opened in 2010 and connected major destinations in the region with more than ten miles of track. However, Republican leaders and Governor Tommy Thompson backtracked and banned use of the funds for a light rail system. Future-alderman Robert Bauman led a group in filing a complaint with the US DOT, stating that the state's action had a discriminatory impact against carless African Americans in Milwaukee. The US DOT decided for Bauman's group and the City of Milwaukee and Wisconsin DOT agreed to split the funds equally. Both groups' shares were used for various transportation projects over the years. The City ended up using its remaining $54 million, in addition to $10 million from a tax increment financing district, as its local match to a federal grant.

=== Funding and approval ===
The total cost to construct the streetcar was estimated in 2015 to be US$123.9 million (equivalent to $168.29 million in 2025). The project was approved by the Milwaukee Common Council on January 21, 2015, and upheld on February 10, 2015, by a vote of 10 to 5. In October 2015, the project received a federal grant which will cover approximately half the cost of a spur to the lakefront.

Initial route plans had streetcars run only northbound on Van Buren Street and only southbound on Jackson Street. In February 2016, this split was removed to reduce utility relocation costs. In mid-April 2016, the city invited bids for the construction of the project's first phase, with a June 1 due date for proposals. At that time, it was estimated that construction could begin in late summer or early fall 2016 and be completed in 2018.

=== M-Line construction and testing ===
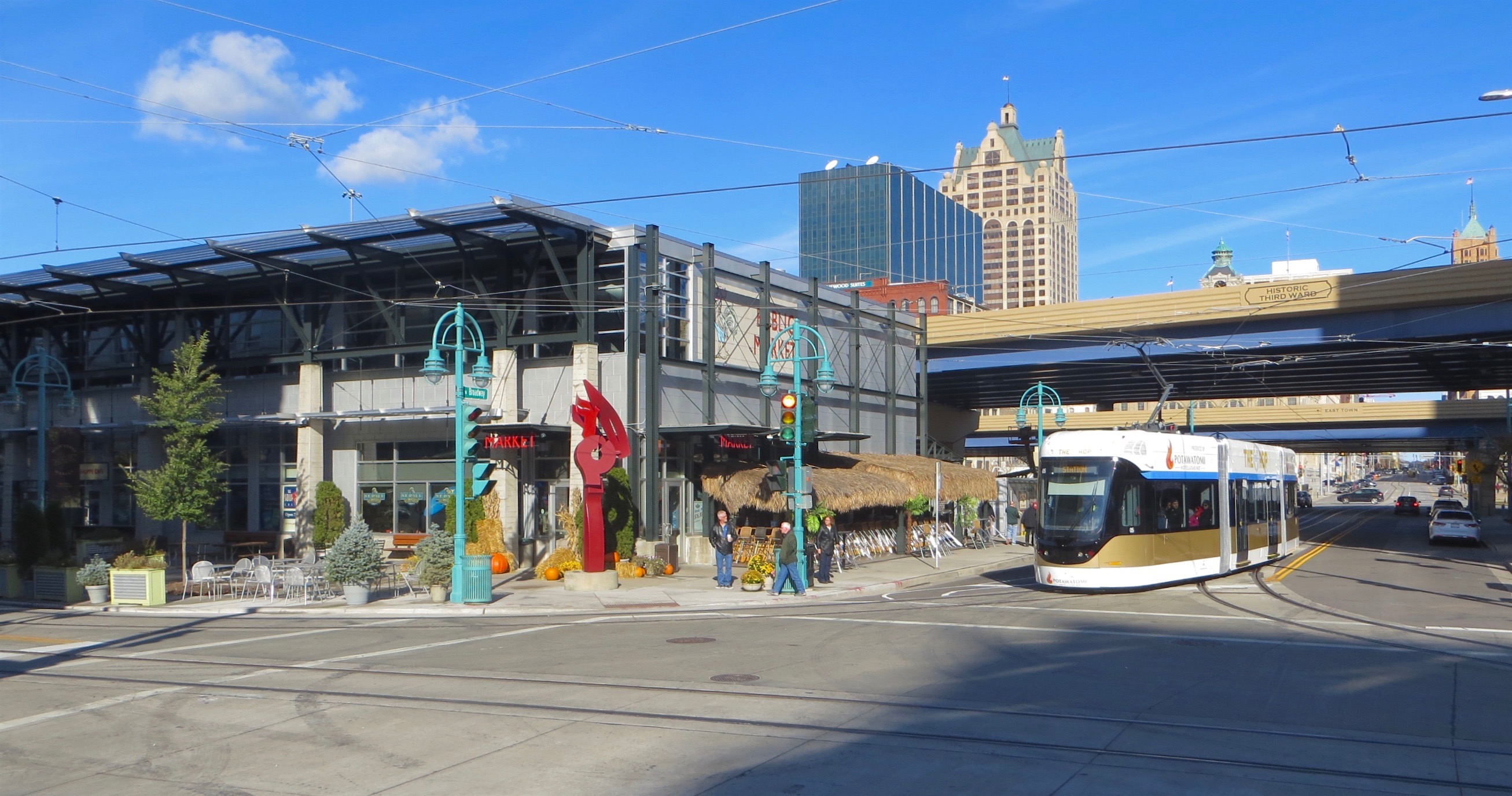
A Hop car turning from Broadway onto St. Paul Avenue, passing the Milwaukee Public Market

On August 19, 2016, Omaha contractor Kiewit Infrastructure was announced as the winning bidder for the contract to construct the line and carhouse. In February 2017, it was announced that track construction was projected to begin in April that year, which it did. Work on utility relocation relating to the project had already started in 2016, as did construction of the maintenance facility for the line. Installation of the tracks along the route began in May 2017. By March 2018, more than 90% of the track had been installed along the initial line.

In mid-2017, the city signed a contract with Transdev to operate and maintain the streetcar system for at least five years. The first test trip covering the entire line under power was made on the night of June 18/19, 2018. Training of operators also began that month.

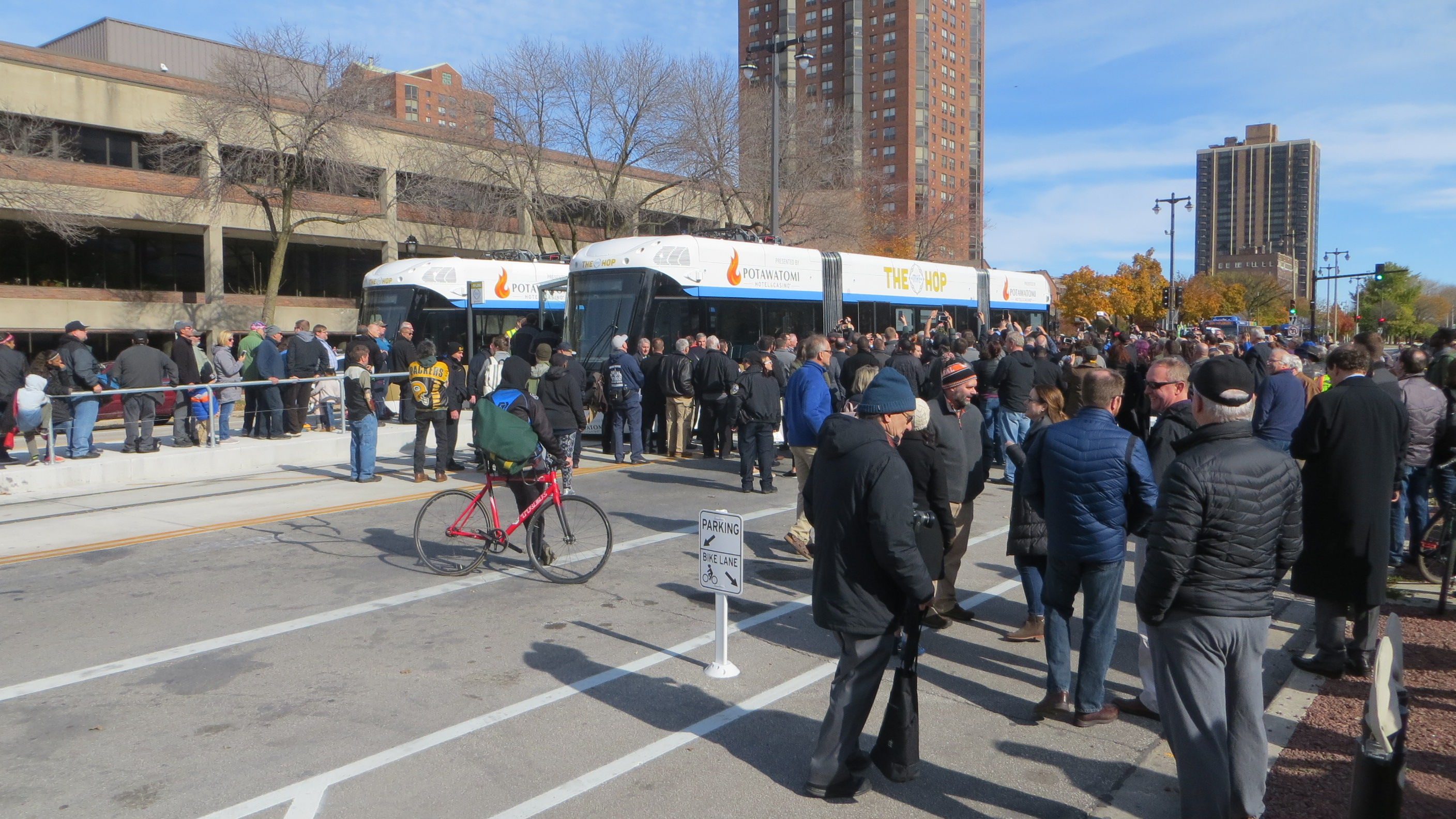
Opening-day crowd at Cathedral Square stop

In October 2017, it was announced that a 12-year sponsorship deal, including naming rights, had been reached between the Potawatomi Native American community and the city of Milwaukee. Under the agreement, the Milwaukee Streetcar was formally renamed "The Hop, presented by Potawatomi Hotel & Casino" – The Hop, for short – in exchange for $10 million in funding from the Potawatomi. These corporate sponsorship funds would also allow all Hop service to be free for the first year, city officials said.

=== L-Line and F-Line ===
By June 2018, the L-Line had been constructed except for its outermost section, where delays to the start of work on The Couture prevented finishing construction. The planned opening was delayed to late 2019, then late 2020, then 2021, then September 2023, requiring an act of Congress to extend a federal grant program and putting the completion of the L-Line five years behind schedule.

The L-Line opened to the public on October 29, 2023, in a reduced form that only ran on Sundays and bypassed the lakefront. Full daily service, including to The Couture's transit concourse, serving both The Hop and Milwaukee County Transit System (MCTS)'s Connect 1, began on April 11, 2024.

In late-June 2024, ahead of the 2024 edition of Summerfest, the system merged its two separate lines into a single line in a temporary "Festival Line" ("F–Line") arrangement. Under this arrangement, all trains serve all stations. This was done in order to increase service to the Lakefront stop (the nearest stop to the north gate of Henry Maier Festival Park) and in hopes of making the system less confusing to festival visitors. It had initially been slated to end at the close of Summerfest. However, on July 11 it was announced that the "Festival Line" arrangement would continue until the end of the summer in order to make the festival grounds more accessible for attendees of other events held there over the summer. At the end of July, however, the Milwaukee Common Council voted to discontinue the "F-Line" operations early and return The Hop to its normal two-line operation.

=== Future ===
Two additional extensions are being planned: one north past Fiserv Forum into Bronzeville and the second as a new branch from the Third Ward and extending south to Walker's Point. A portion of the northerly M-line extension was originally planned to be operational in time for the 2020 Democratic National Convention. For political reasons, construction approval was bundled with planning approval for the Bronzeville and Walker's Point extensions; controversy over the location of the Walker's Point terminal scuttled approval for all three proposals. Since the 2020 Democratic National Convention ultimately became a virtual event due to the COVID-19 crisis, the short term need for the partial extension became moot.

The City of Milwaukee has applied for a TIGER Grant to gain federal funds to fund 50% of the system's extension up 4th Street towards the new Fiserv Forum and the Bronzeville neighborhood.

2023 Wisconsin Act 12 restricts Milwaukee from using any taxes, including tax increment financing (TIF) districts, to operate or expand The Hop. Before the use of TIF funds for The Hop was made illegal, due to other funding restrictions the state imposes, Milwaukee was forced to disproportionally rely on them for construction of The Hop compared to other American cities that built modern streetcar networks. The city cannot proceed with future grants unless it is able to work around state-imposed restrictions to provide a local match.

== Operations ==
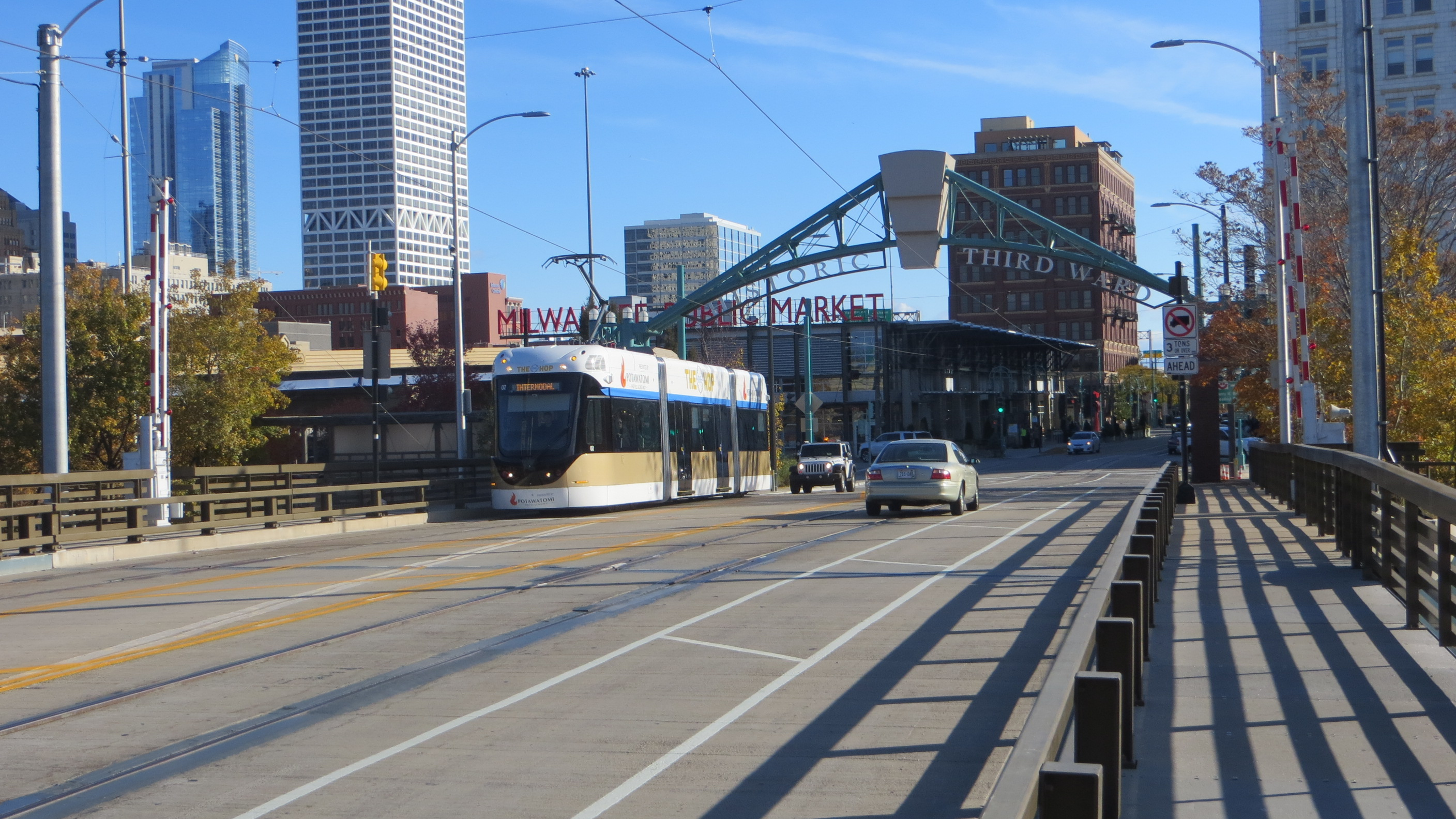
An M-line streetcar crosses the St. Paul Avenue Bridge over the Milwaukee River

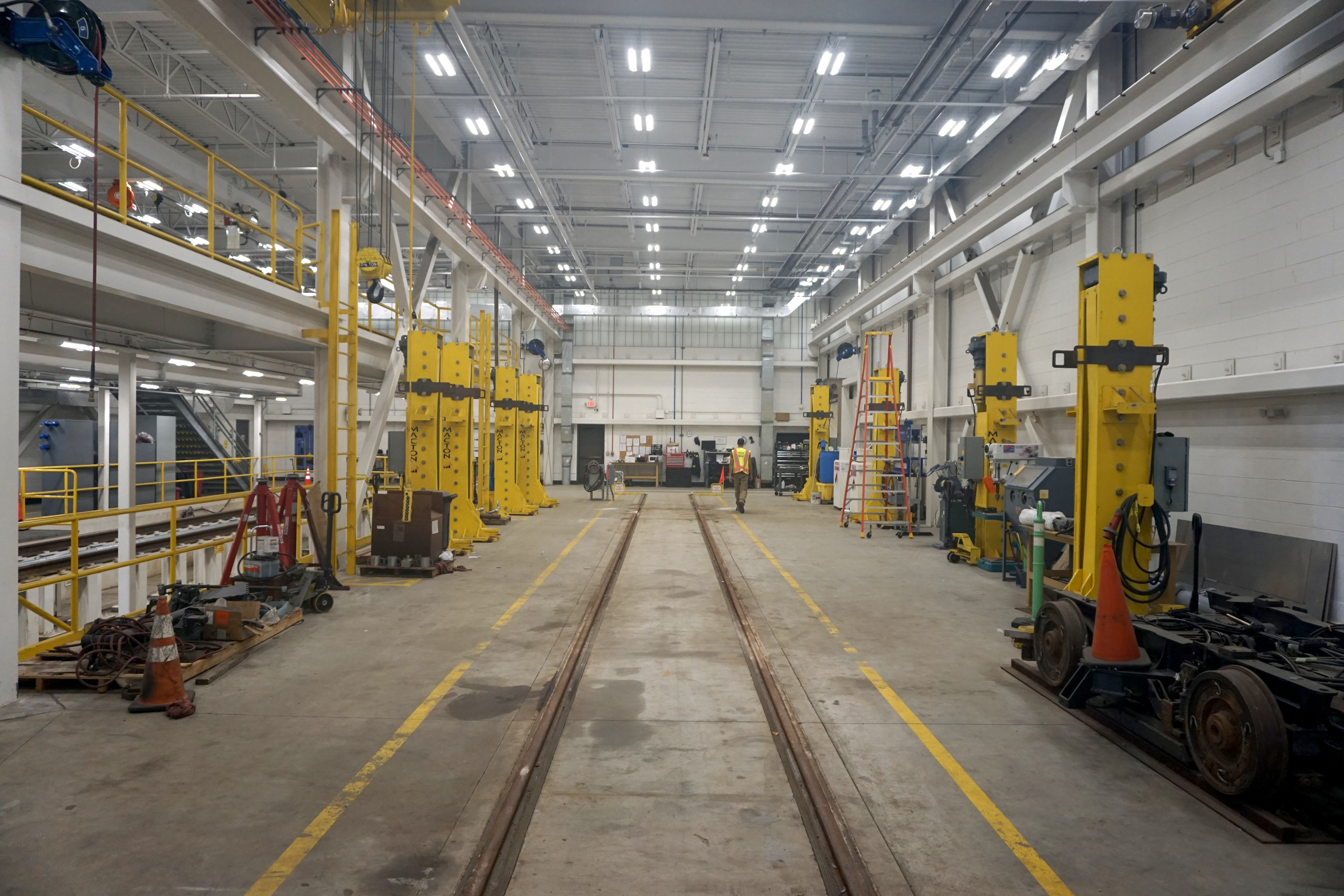
The Hop Milwaukee Streetcar Operations and Maintenance Facility

The system is operated by Transdev, under contract to the city of Milwaukee, the streetcar system's owner. The contract goes through December 2023, covering the first five years of in-service operation, with an option for a five-year extension.

Hop service runs seven days a week, from 5 a.m. to midnight Monday to Friday, 7 a.m. to midnight Saturdays, and 7 a.m. to 10 p.m. Sundays. Fare-free service originally planned to end after one year is still in effect due to delays in procuring a fare sale/validation system. The system's car house, its storage and maintenance facility, is on Vel R. Phillips Avenue (4th Street), under an elevated section of the I-794 freeway.

An M-line streetcar on opening day, November 2, 2018, stopping at the Burns Commons station

The northern terminus of the M-Line is Burns Commons (Ogden Avenue at Prospect Avenue). From there, the line follows Ogden Avenue in both directions to Jackson Street, turns west on Kilbourn Avenue, then splits; southbound streetcars follow N. Broadway, while northbound streetcars follow N. Milwaukee Street. 0.575 miles (925 m) later, two-way running resumes at E. St. Paul Avenue. After crossing the Milwaukee River, the line then follows W. St. Paul Avenue in both directions to N. 4th Street, terminating at the Milwaukee Intermodal Station. The total journey length is 2.1 miles (3.4 km). Kiosks displaying real-time arrival times are installed at the Intermodal Station, Cathedral Square, and Burns Commons stations.

The new L-Line uses the tracks of the M-Line along Milwaukee Street and Broadway to make a loop around the city's central business district, then extends through a covered station within the Couture residential high-rise tower on N. Lincoln Memorial Dr. via E. Michigan St. and E. Clybourn Street.

Of the 2.1-mile (3.4 km) length of the M-Line, 3,300 feet (1 km) is not equipped with overhead wires. The streetcars cover these sections along Kilbourn Avenue and Jackson Street powered only by their batteries. About two-thirds of the track sections used for the L-Line are also off-wire.

== Rolling stock ==
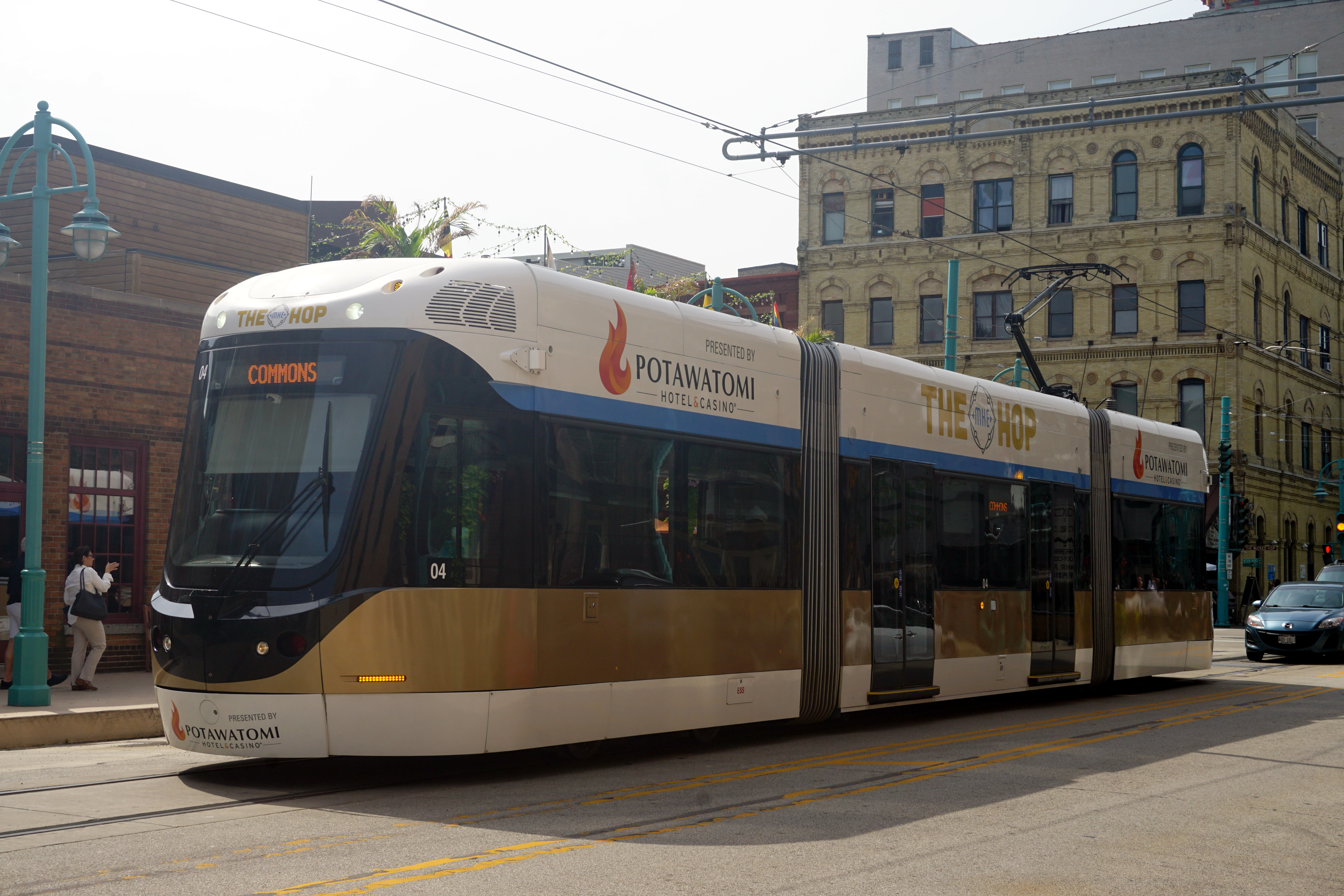
The Hop Liberty model streetcar

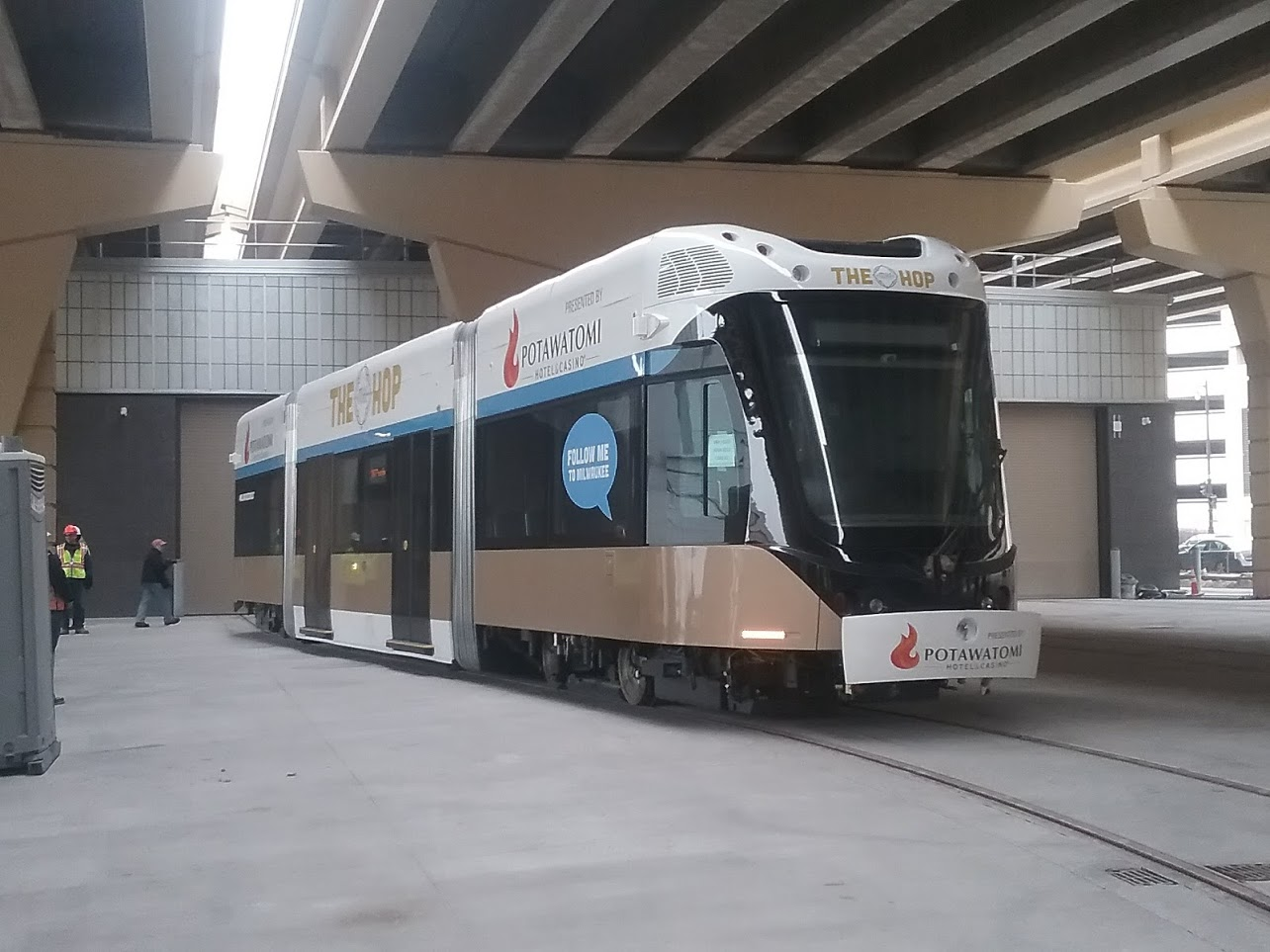
The first streetcar for The Hop, when newly delivered, March 2018

On April 6, 2015, the city invited bids for the supply of four streetcars, with the issuing of a request for proposals to interested manufacturers. In November 2015, the city awarded an $18.6-million contract to Brookville Equipment Corporation to build four "Liberty" model streetcars for Milwaukee. A fifth car was added to the order later, to expand the fleet sufficiently to be able to serve the future Lakefront extension.

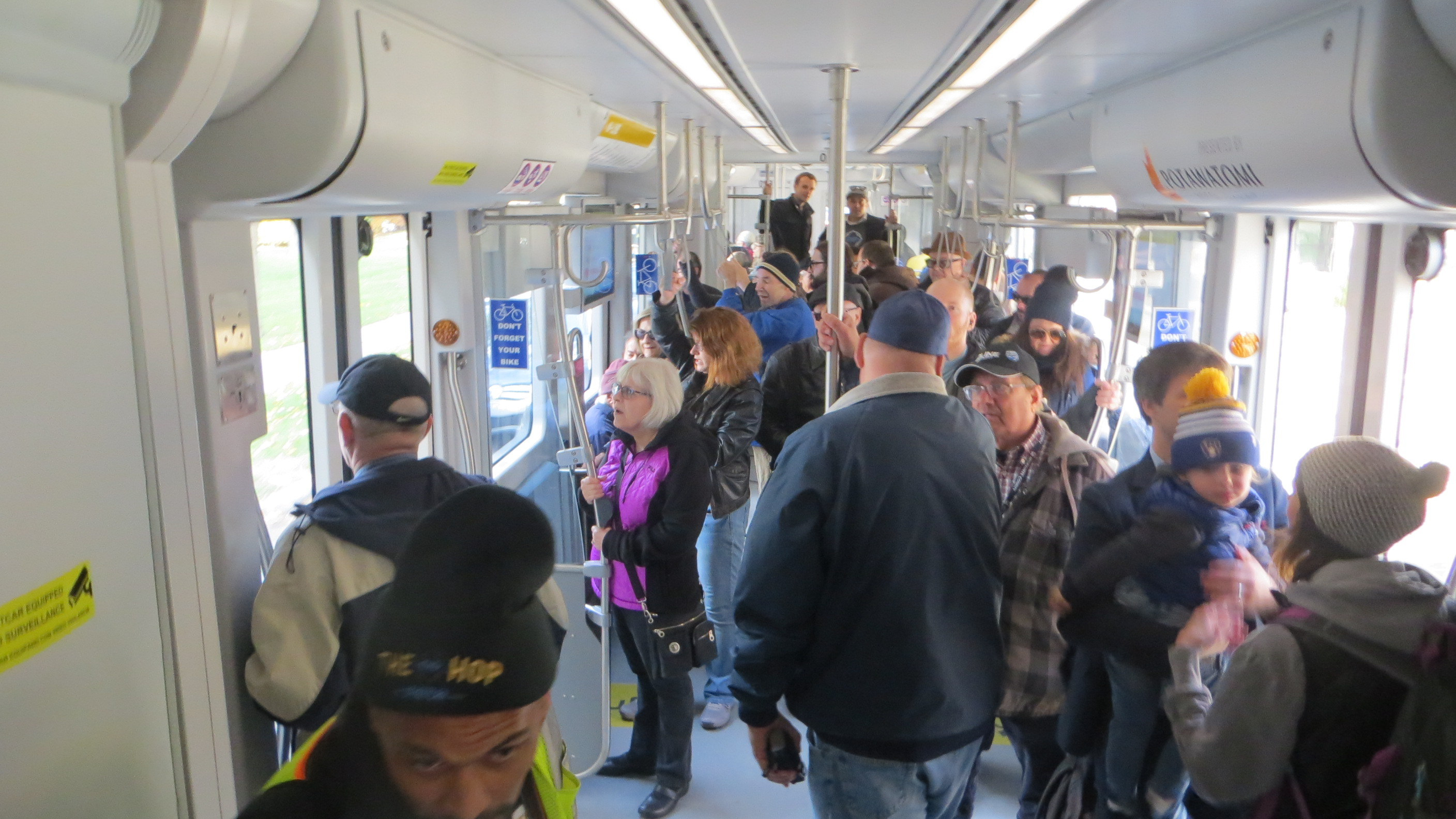
Interior view

The city specified that the streetcars be capable of operating in service using only battery power part of the time, because almost one third of the line is not equipped with overhead wires; the batteries are charged when the vehicles are on the wired portions of the line. The sections that will be operated on battery power only are along Kilbourn Avenue and Jackson Street. All other parts of the line have overhead wires, although a portion of the future branch to the Lakefront area is also planned to be unwired.

The first of the five vehicles arrived in Milwaukee from Brookville on March 26, 2018, and made the first test run over a short section of the line on April 11. The cars are numbered 01–05; each is 67 feet (20 m) long, weighs 83,000 pounds (38,000 kg; 38 t) and is designed to carry 120 to 150 passengers. On May 14, 2018, the second streetcar was delivered, followed by the third on July 26. The fifth and final car on order was delivered on September 7, 2018.

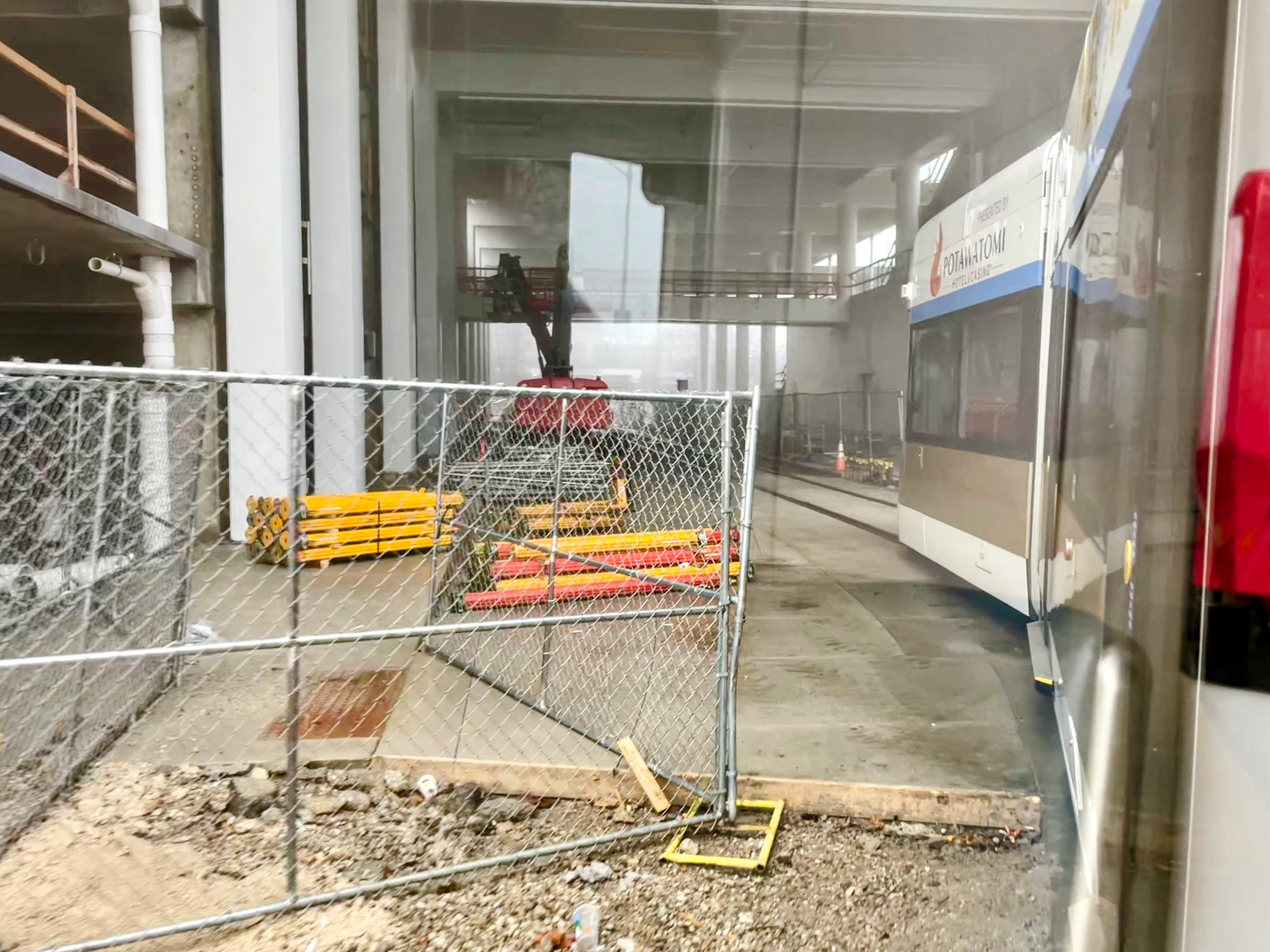
A vehicle exiting the base of The Couture. Vehicles started operation through here in 2023, even before the station (and tower) were completed.

== Stations ==
Stop	Line(s)		Neighborhood(s)	Connections
Stop	M	L	Neighborhood(s)	Connections
Burns Commons	✓	X	The Lower East Side	MCTS: Route 30
Ogden/Astor (WB and EB)	✓	X	The Lower East Side	MCTS: Routes 14, 30
Ogden/Jackson WB	✓	X	The Lower East Side	MCTS: Routes 15, 30
Ogden/Jackson EB	✓	X	The Lower East Side	MCTS: Routes 15, 30
Jackson/Juneau SB	✓	X	Yankee Hill	MCTS: Routes 15, 33
Jackson/Juneau NB	✓	X	Yankee Hill	MCTS: Routes 15, 33
Cathedral Square (WB and EB)	✓	X	East Town	MCTS: Route 30
City Hall SB	✓	✓	East Town	MCTS: Routes 15, 18, 57, GreenLine
City Hall NB	✓	✓	East Town	MCTS: Routes 15, 18, 57, GreenLine
Wisconsin Avenue SB	✓	✓	East Town	MCTS: Routes 14, 30; CONNECT 1
Wisconsin Avenue NB	✓	✓	East Town	MCTS: Routes 14, 30; CONNECT 1
Clybourn at Jefferson	X	✓		
Lakefront	X	✓		CONNECT 1
Michigan at Jackson	X	✓		
Historic Third Ward WB	✓	X	Historic Third Ward	MCTS: Routes 15, 18, GreenLine
Historic Third Ward EB	✓	✓	Historic Third Ward	MCTS: Routes 15, 18, GreenLine
St. Paul/Plankinton WB	✓	X	Station District	
St. Paul/Plankinton EB	✓	X	Station District	
Milwaukee Intermodal Station	✓	X	Station District	Amtrak: Borealis, Hiawatha, Empire Builder; MCTS: Routes 12, 31, 34, 57, BlueLine; Badger Bus, WCL/Coach USA, Greyhound, FlixBus, Lamers, Jefferson Lines, Indian Trails, Megabus

== Ridership ==
The busiest day for The Hop was July 13, 2019, with 9,000 riders.

== See also ==
- Milwaukee County Transit System
- Streetcars in North America
- List of streetcar systems in the United States
