= Milwaukee Public Market =

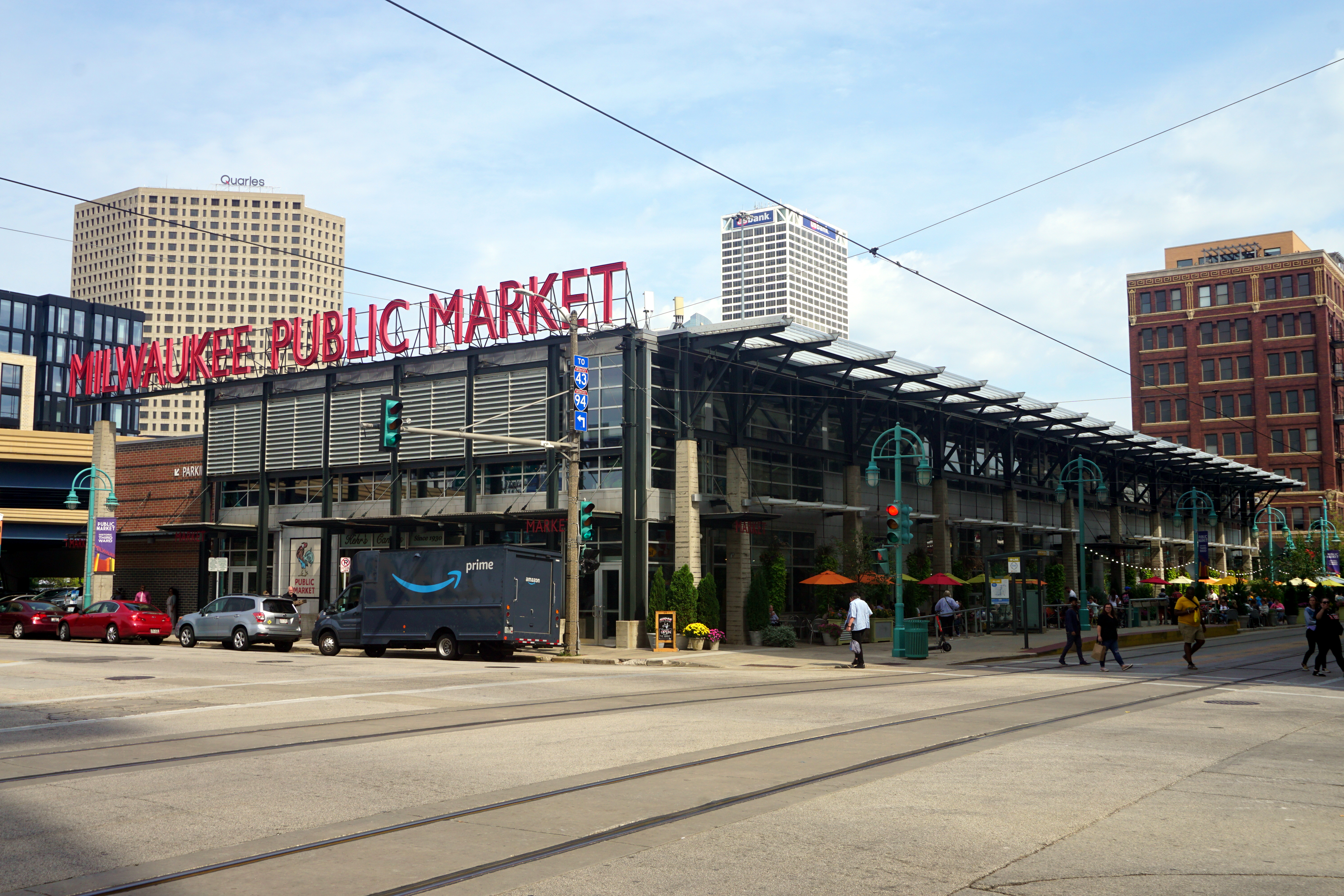
- Market as viewed from the southwest.
- Interactive map of the Milwaukee Public Market area

General information
- Location: 400 North Water Street, Milwaukee, Wisconsin, United States
- Coordinates: 43.03524°N 87.90808°W
- Opened: 2005
- Cost: $10 million

Other information
- Public transit: MCTS; The Hop

Milwaukee Public Market is a public market located in the Historic Third Ward neighborhood in Milwaukee, Wisconsin. Space in the building is leased to vendors, primarily local food businesses.

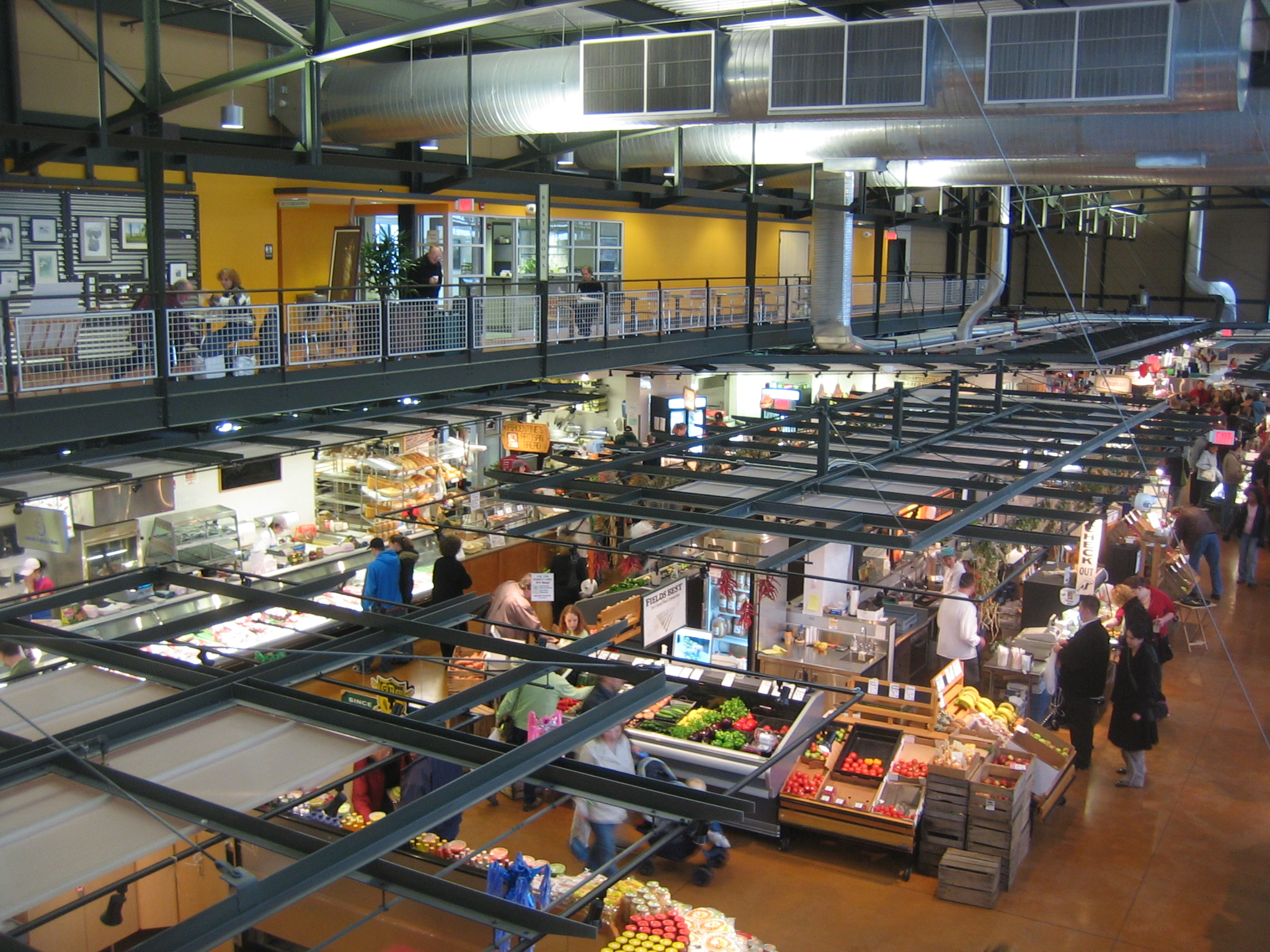
Interior of Milwaukee Public Market

The market's founders drew inspiration for the development from the Pike Place Market in Seattle, Washington, envisioning a space that would support smaller, local businesses.

Typical food offerings include bakery items, meats, produce, seafood, soup, cheese, spices, wine, coffee, and candies. When the market opened in 2005, it focused primarily on selling raw ingredients, but over time, organizers found that vendors were more successful selling freshly prepared foods. Other vendors offer flowers, gifts, and apparel. The market also includes community space for events.

The Milwaukee Public Market building was designed by The Kubala Washatko Architects (TKWA) from Cedarburg, Wisconsin and opened in 2005. The firm states that the steel, glass, and brick material chosen for the building "honors the industrial history of the Third Ward." The initial development cost approximately $10 million and was funded with a mix of private and public funds.

Since November 2018, the market is served by a station on The Hop.
