= Historic Third Ward (Milwaukee) =

- Historic Third Ward District
- U.S. National Register of Historic Places
- U.S. Historic district
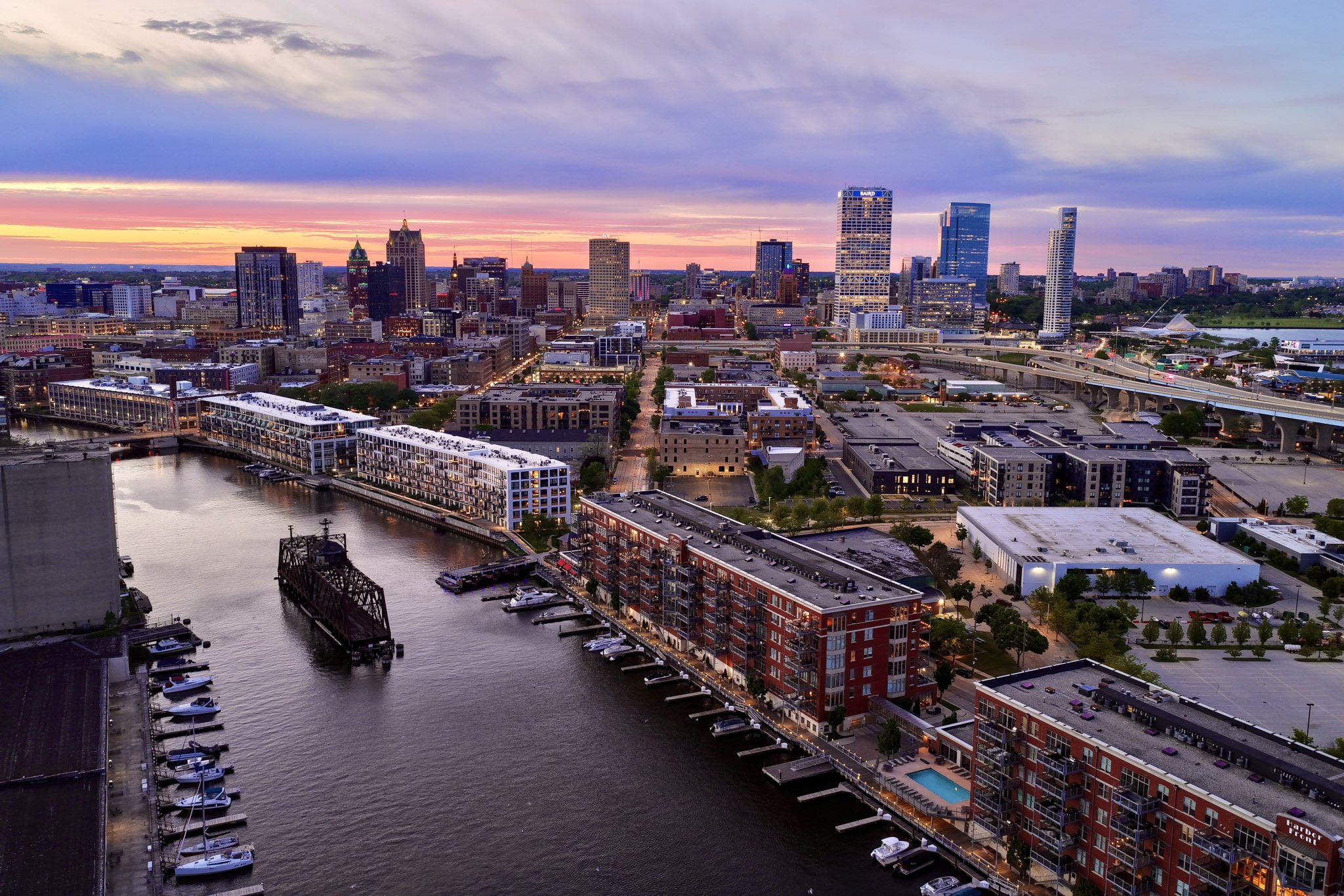
- Historic Third Ward in 2026
- Location: Milwaukee, Wisconsin, U.S.
- Coordinates: 43.0328°N 87.9057°W
- Built: 1875
- Architect: Multiple
- Architectural style: Late Victorian
- NRHP reference No.: 84003724
- Added to NRHP: March 8, 1984

The Historic Third Ward is a historic warehouse district located in downtown Milwaukee, Wisconsin. This Milwaukee neighborhood is listed on the National Register of Historic Places. The Third Ward is home to over 450 businesses and maintains a strong position within the retail and professional service community in the city as a showcase of a mixed-use district. The neighborhood's renaissance is anchored by many specialty shops, restaurants, art galleries and theatre groups, creative businesses and condos. It is home to the Milwaukee Institute of Art and Design and Broadway Theatre Center. The Ward is adjacent to the Henry Maier Festival Park, home to Summerfest. The neighborhood is bounded by the Milwaukee River to the west and south, East Clybourn Street to the north, and Lake Michigan to the east.

== History ==
=== Early development ===
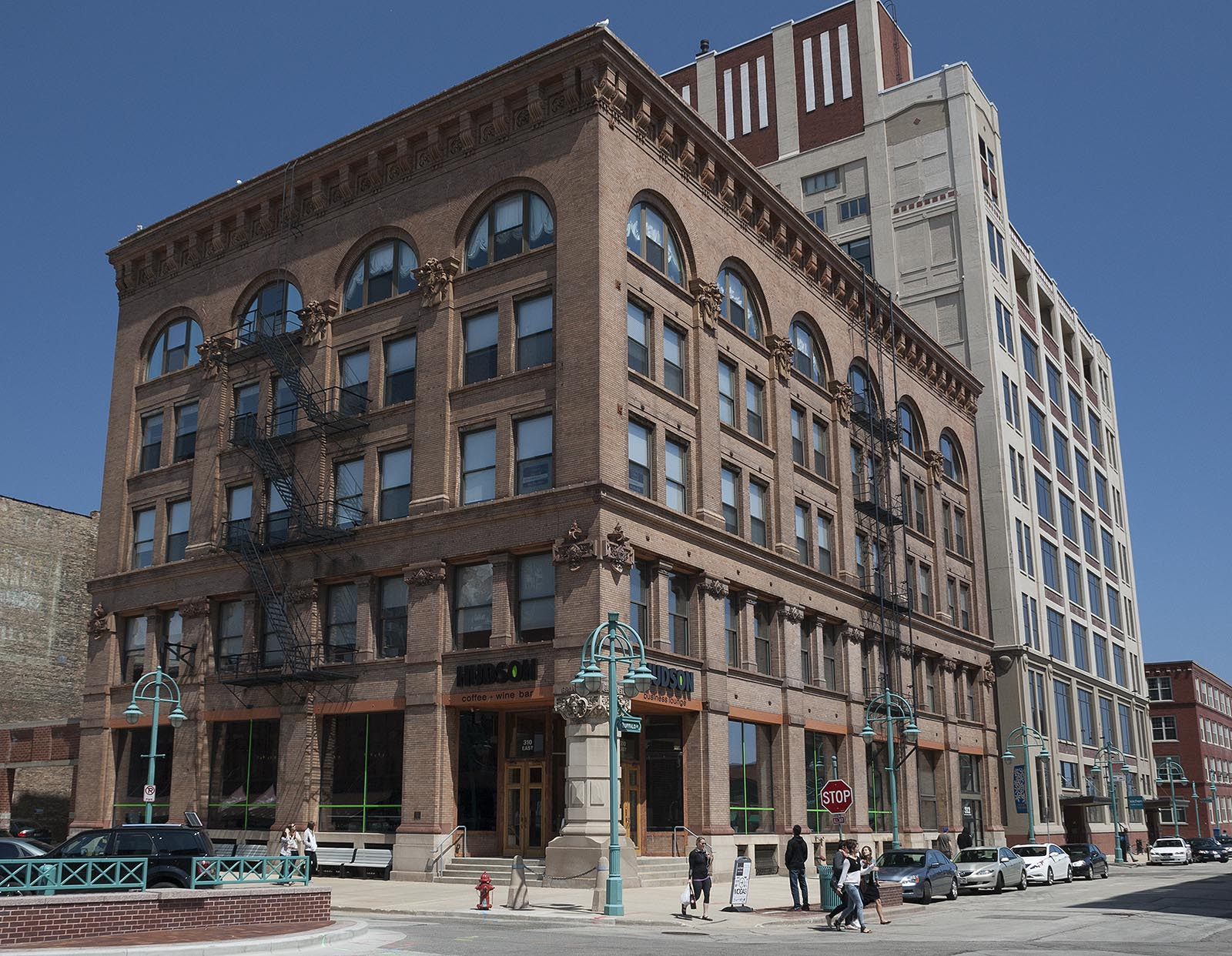
Baumbach Building, built 1899

The Third Ward is one of the oldest neighborhoods in Milwaukee. During the early years of the city, the Third Ward was a relatively flat, swampy area located between the shore of Lake Michigan and the Milwaukee River. In the 1850s, the land was drained, and soon wood-frame houses populated the east side of the Ward, while on the west side, along the east side of the Milwaukee River, masonry factories and warehouses were constructed. Irish immigrants were the early settlers of the area. The Ward became known as the "Bloody Third," a reputation the area earned for its frequent fistfights and working class immigrant population.

The first railroad linked Milwaukee to the Mississippi River in 1856, letting wholesalers supply needed goods to the population of settlers in the West. The Irish settlers in the Third Ward went through two major tragedies. On September 7, 1860, the Lady Elgin steamship left Milwaukee carrying a large number of passengers from the Third Ward's Irish community. About 300 people are believed to have died when the ship sank, making this the second greatest loss of life seen on the Great Lakes and greatest in open waters on Lake Michigan. A Wisconsin Historical Marker in the Third Ward commemorates the tragedy while a monument dedicated at Calvary Cemetery serves as a cenotaph. The area rapidly developed through the late 19th Century as a mixed-use industrial and residential district home to Milwaukee immigrants and abundant with jobs. The Milwaukee River side of the neighborhood was crowded with ships loading cargo while the east side of the neighborhood was bounded by a vast railyard with lines running north to Green Bay, Wisconsin.

=== Third Ward Fire of 1892 ===
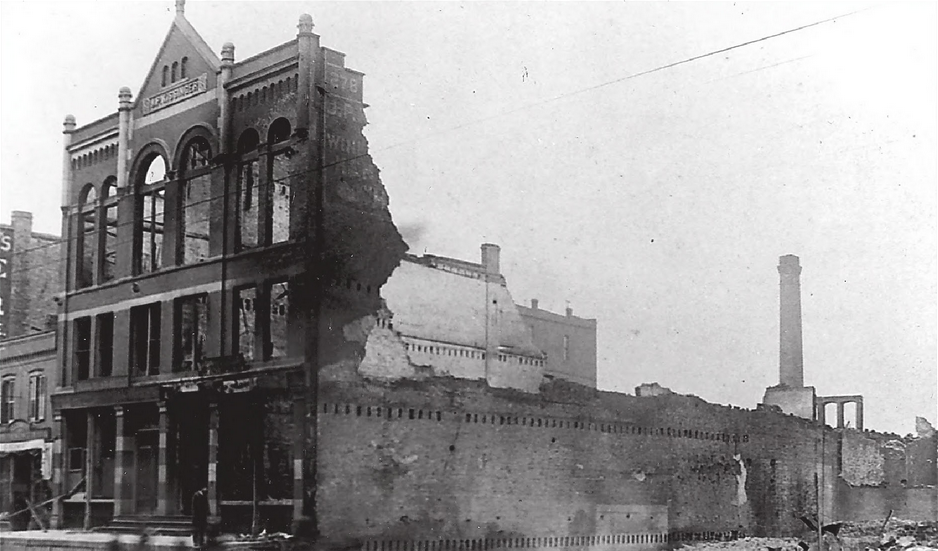
After the fire of 1892

The second tragedy struck on October 28, 1892. A fire started by spontaneous combustion at the Union Oil & Paint Co. building along the Milwaukee River at Water Street. Strong winds of up to 50 mph helped to spread the fire to the Ward's other buildings. The fire quickly grew out of control. Cities such as Chicago, Kenosha, Racine, Sheboygan and Oshkosh sent horse-drawn units by rail to help Milwaukee's fire department fight the flames. A total of 440 buildings were destroyed and more than 1,900 people, mostly Irish-American families, were left without homes by the time the fire was finally under control at midnight. Those families sought shelter in the Third Ward School, the Cathedral of St. John the Evangelist, and the old St. Gall's Church, which housed hundreds overnight. Victims also received meal tickets to restaurants and clothing.

Prominent local architects stepped in to design many of the commercial structures after the 1892 fire. Over the next 36 years construction continued, giving the buildings an interesting continuity that unified the neighborhood because of this relatively short time of development. Italian immigrants replaced the Irish-Americans during this period of reconstruction, and the Irish-Americans had moved to different areas in the city. The Italian-Americans were very prolific in the warehouse businesses, establishing Commission Row, a grouping of grocery commission houses. By 1915, 29 Italian saloons, 45 Italian groceries, an Italian bank and two spaghetti factories populated the Ward. Grocery warehouses, liquor distributors dry goods businesses and manufacturers were the business that flourished during this time.

=== Urban decline and renewal ===
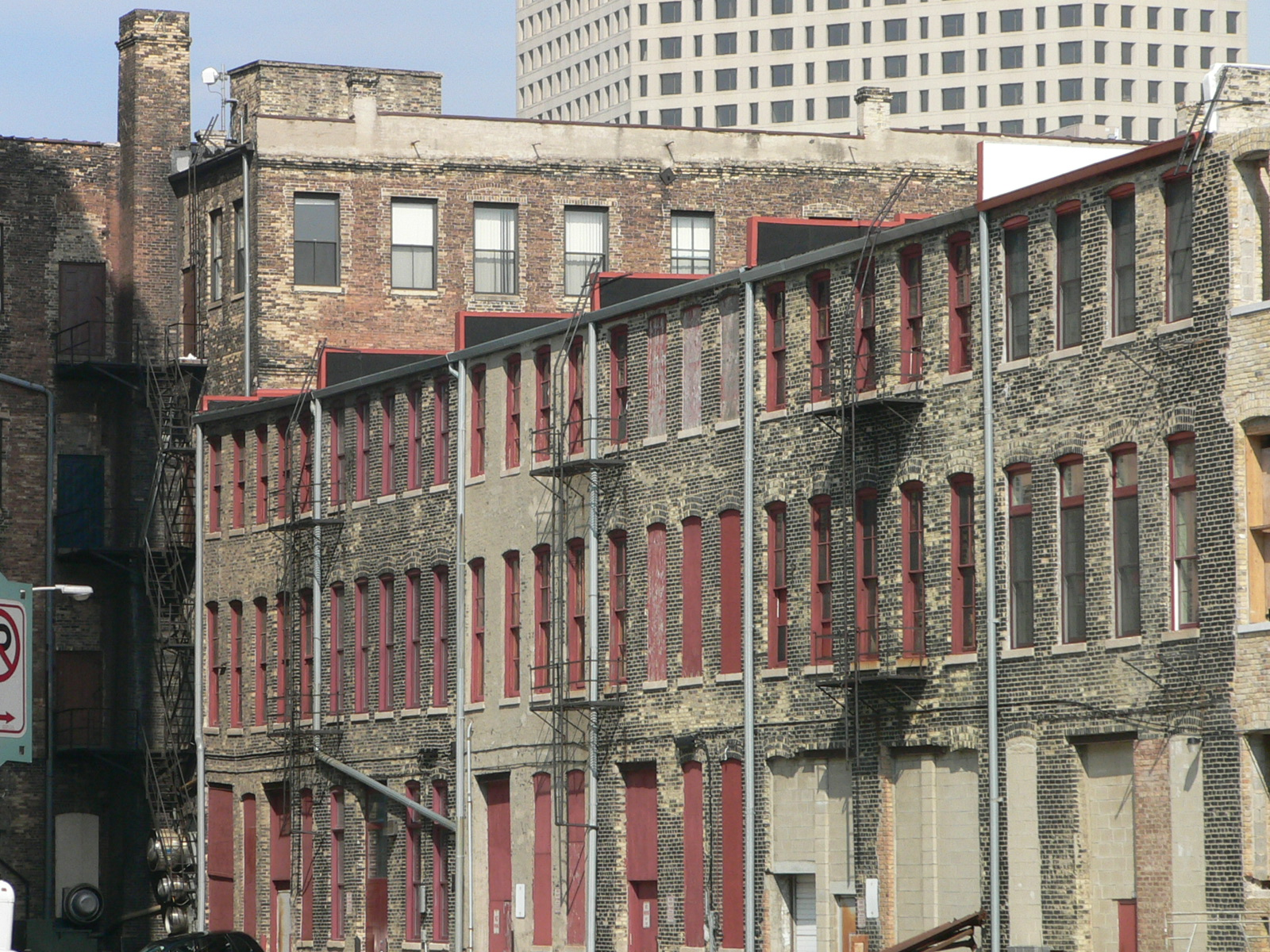
Alley view of Commission Row, before renovation in 2005

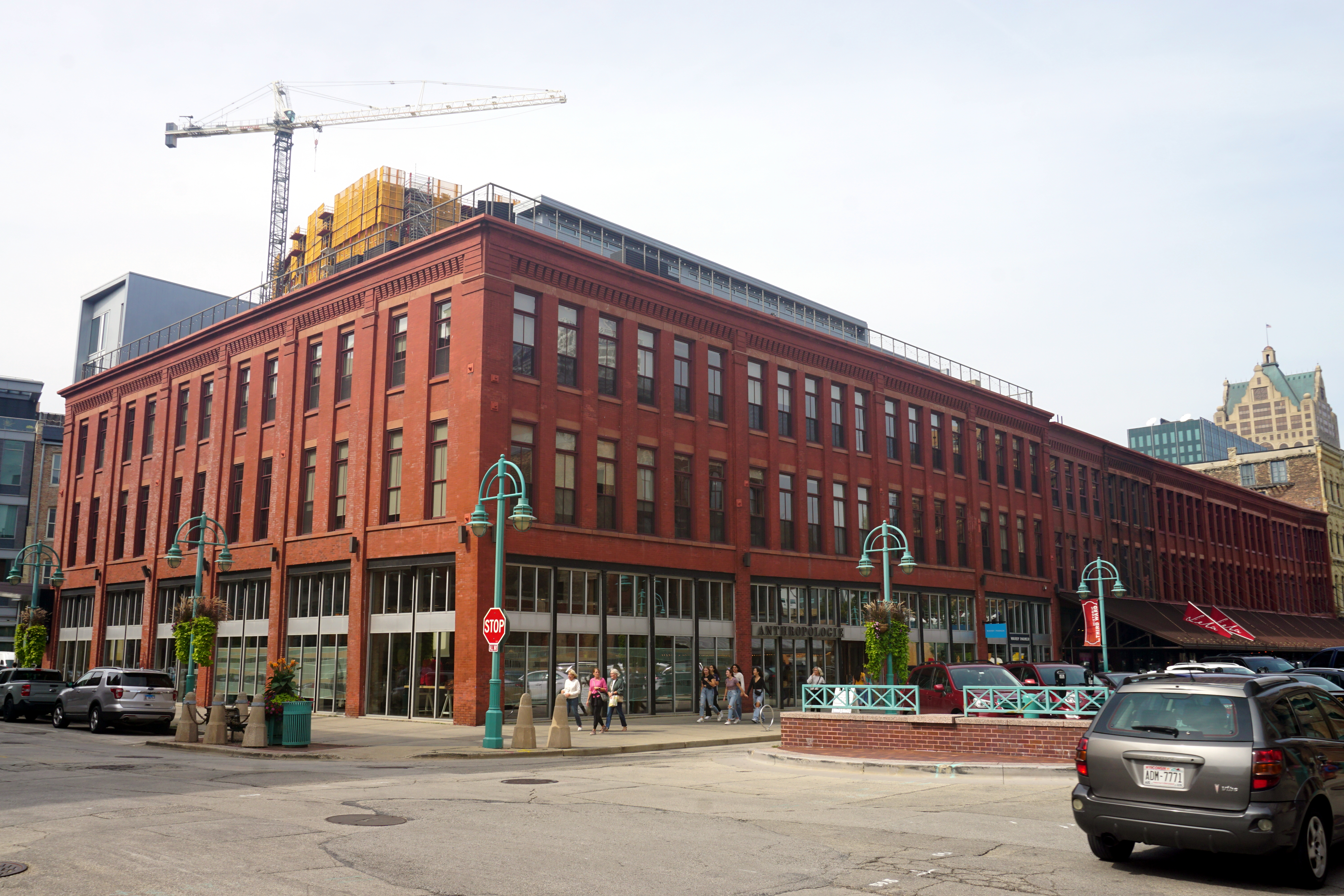
Commission Row in 2023

The development of I-794 in the 1960s forced out the majority of the close-knit Italian-American Third Ward community, including the demolition of Blessed Virgin of Pompeii Catholic Church in 1967 (named earlier that year as Milwaukee's first architectural landmark). The trucking industry and suburban sprawl led to the decline of warehouse operations and industry as well, leaving much of the Third Ward barren. By the 1970s, the area became known as a Red-light district to the dismay of many long-standing residents and business owners. As a result, several business owners united to successfully combat the spread of "red light" uses in the neighborhood.

By the 1980s, a growing number of Milwaukeeans began to realize the architectural and cultural value of the district. "The Historic Third Ward District" was established by the National Register of Historic Places as it accepts 70 buildings spanning approximately 10 square blocks in the district. It was also during this period that the Milwaukee Institute of Art and Design purchased a former warehouse in the neighborhood and renovated it as its main campus building. Later in the 1980s, the City of Milwaukee Department of Public Works removed the Buffalo Street Bridge. This project proved controversial as it removed a valuable access point to the Third Ward, further isolating it but also helping to maintain its unique atmosphere.

The 1990s marked a period of rapid development in the Third Ward, as historic warehouses were purchased and renovated into market-rate housing, at times displacing former tenants. During this period, the City of Milwaukee invested $3.4 million in streetscape projects, as well as in the construction of two large municipal parking structures, in an effort to draw visitors to the area. Several hundred new loft-style apartments were opened during the decade, along with new offices in former warehouse buildings. The Milwaukee Riverwalk was opened to the public, providing an additional link along the Milwaukee River between Downtown Milwaukee and the Third Ward.

=== 21st century ===
In 2000, the Historic Third Ward Association began co-sponsoring Milwaukee's premier art event, Gallery Night and Day, a quarterly event which attracts thousands of visitors to the neighborhood. The Historic Third Ward experienced an influx of upscale women's boutiques, restaurants and high-end furnishings businesses. In 2005, the Milwaukee Public Market opened to the public offering an array of year-round indoor gourmet and specialty food options. Later in 2010, Erie Street Plaza, a small park and public space built on a former parking lot, opened on the southern edge of the neighborhood, near the confluence of the Milwaukee River and Kinnickinnic River.

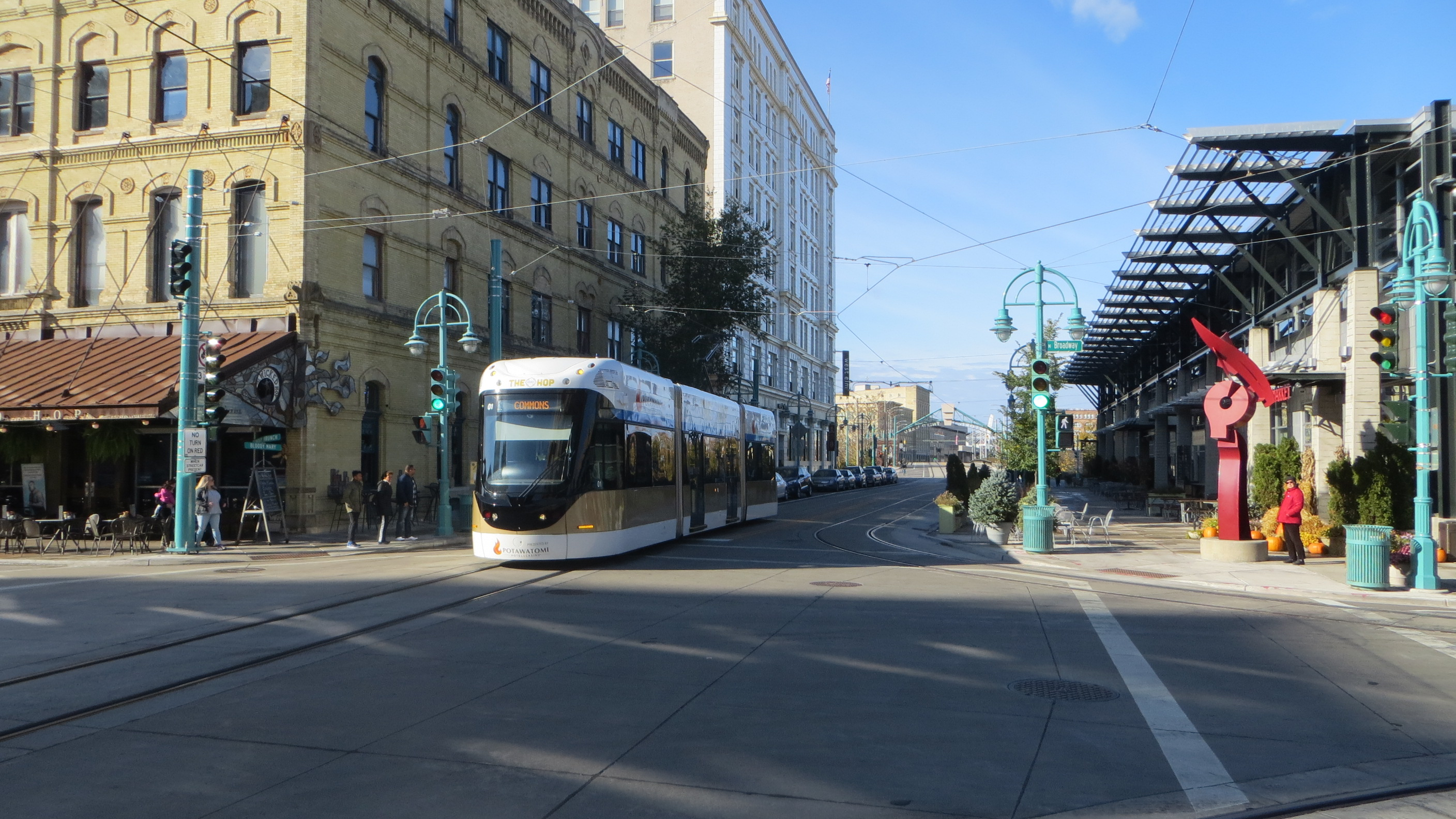
St. Paul Avenue at Broadway with a Hop streetcar in 2018

The Hop began service in 2018, connecting the neighborhood to Downtown Milwaukee to the Milwaukee Intermodal Station. The Hop has a station located at the Milwaukee Public Market. In 2019, murals by two European artists appeared in the area. First, two murals by French artist MTO were commissioned on private property, spotlighting endangered species. ' Later the same summer, the iconic mural "The Unsung Hero" by German artist Andreas von Chrzanowski, "Case Maclaim" was commissioned by Singerman Real Estate for the PH Dye Building. The six-story mural is visible from Highway 794 and is now a Historic Third Ward tourist attraction. ' By 2022, nearly all of the historic structures in the Third Ward have been redeveloped into residential, commercial or retail uses. Developers in the 2020s began to focus more heavily on new construction projects like the 31-story 333 North Water development at the corner of Water Street and St Paul Avenue, the new Kimpton Journeyman Hotel, and various apartment buildings.

== Historic district ==
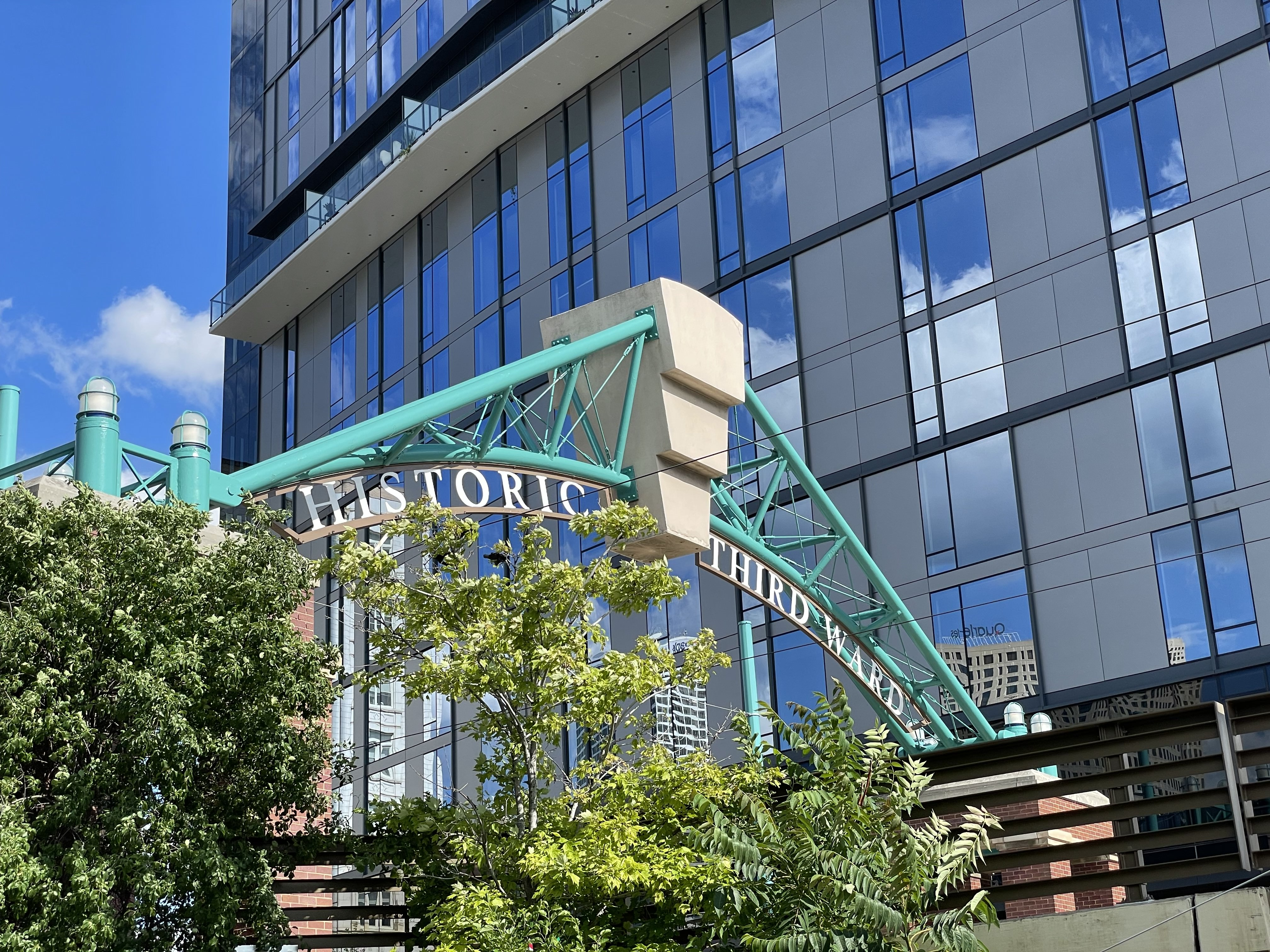
Historic Third Ward entrance arch

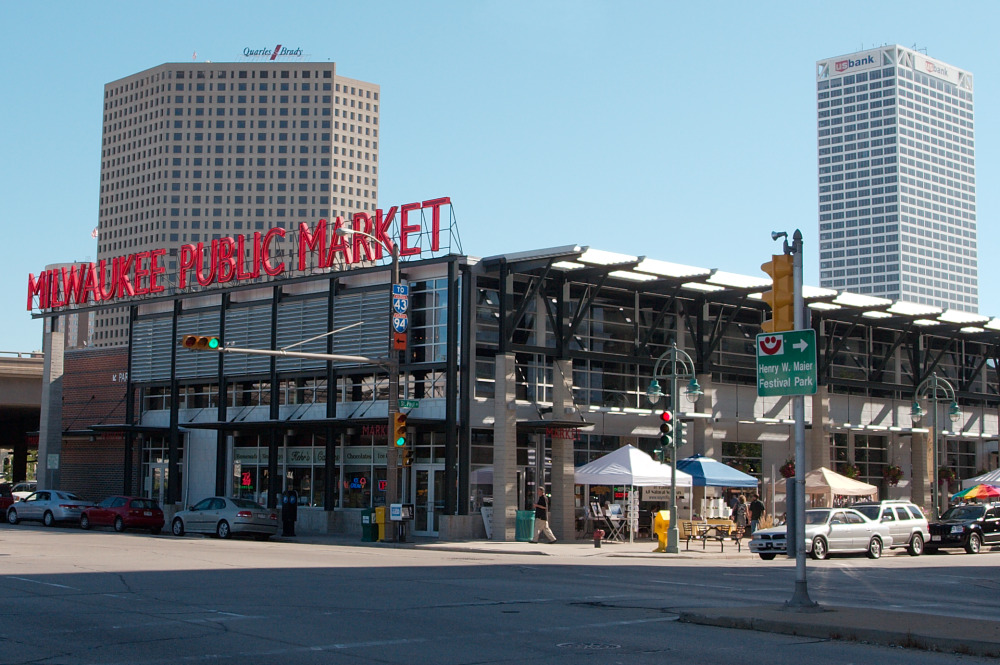
Milwaukee Public Market

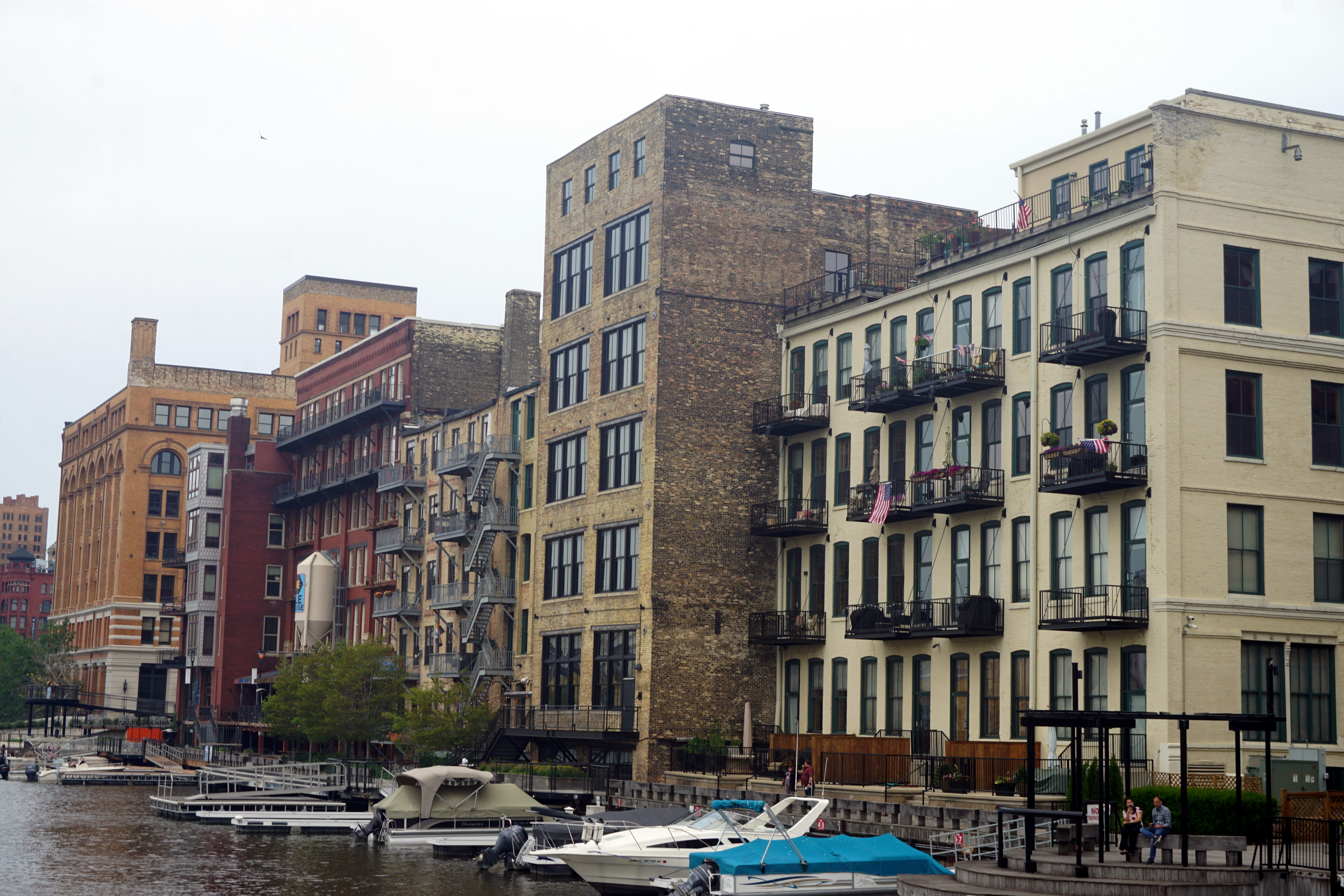
Lofts viewed from the Milwaukee River

In 1984 a cluster of the Third's historic warehouses and industrial buildings built from 1892 to 1928 was designated a NRHP historic district. It is bounded by the Milwaukee River, I-94, and some modern warehouses and parking lots to the east. Contributing structures include:

- The Wirth, Hammel & Co. Sales stable at 167 N. Broadway is a 2-story cream brick horse stable designed by Henry C. Koch and built in 1892 on the site of the same company's previous stable, which had burned in the fire. The stable sold draft, saddle and carriage horses, and sold horses to logging operations in the fall - claiming to be the largest sales stables in the U.S. The basement and first floor could handle 150 horses at a time and the second floor provided sleeping quarters for men and storage. By the 1920s the business was called M.D. Newald's Sons & Co. and was transitioning to auto sales and service.
- The Milwaukee Fire Department Engine Company #10 at 176 N. Broadway is a 3-story red brick structure with a cast iron cornice, designed by Sebastian Brand in Queen Anne style and built in 1893 to replace the earlier fire station, which was destroyed by the fire of 1892.
- The National Distilling Co. at 221 E. Buffalo Ave. is a 4-story office building designed by Crane & Barkhausen in Romanesque Revival style and built in 1893. This building was probably offices, showrooms and storage for the firm which had a distillery in the Menomonee Valley. During Prohibition the name changed to Red Star Yeast and the company produced industrial alcohol, vinegar and yeast. M.A. Lichter Co. bought the building in 1963, for offices, and assembling and showing drapes.
- Wellauer & Hoffman Co. at 232 N. Broadway is a 6-story structure designed by Henry C. Koch & Co. in Romanesque Revival style and built in 1893–94. Wellauer & Hoffman were wholesale grocers, coffee roasters, and specialty jobbers. By 1908 David Adler & Sons Co. was manufacturing men's clothes in the building. By 1932 the first two floors housed a furniture showroom and the third housed Columbia Knitting Company's manufacturing.
- The Ludington Estate Commission Houses at 301-315 N Broadway is a 3-story brick structure designed by Henry C. Koch & Co. and built 1894 to 1895. On a Friday morning in 1910, 145 wagons were counted in front of the block at one time. Served as a center of wholesale groceries, fruit and flower distribution into the 1980s, at least.
- Roundy, Peckham & Dexter Co. at 241 N. Broadway is a 6-story warehouse designed by Howland Russell and built in 1895, with walls of painted red brick with terra cotta trim. The firm started in 1872 as a wholesale grocer. The firm's store on Broadway and Buffalo was destroyed in the fire of 1892, and was replaced by this building. Here the firm imported and jobbed staples and fancy groceries, packed grains and cereals, repacked herring, and roasted coffee and peanuts. In 1952 the firm renamed itself Roundy's Inc.
- The Baumbach Building at 302 N. Broadway is a 5-story Chicago Commercial-style factory designed by Eugene R. Liebert and built in 1899. It originally housed Cohen Bros., which manufactured and sold clothes for lumberjacks and miners. By 1916 the Phoenix Knitting Co. used it, by 1946 Midwest Lamp & Novelty Co.
- The American Candy Co. at 191 N Broadway is a 7-story building designed by Charles Crane with red brick walls trimmed in terra cotta and stone and built in 1902 and expanded in 1906. The candy company was the original occupant, making cream almonds and assorted mixed candy, but known for its "Rex" fine chocolates. Milwaukee Mirror and Art Glass Works shared the building from 1908 to 1918. Boston Store used it as a warehouse starting in 1941, and Pro-Pac starting in 1945, for processing war materials. From 1950 to the 2000s Rauschenberger Co. made twine, cord, and hair goods here.
- The Pabst Brewing Co. Saloon and Boarding House at 124 N Water St. is a 2-story brick structure designed by Charles F. Peters.
- The E.R. Godfrey & Sons Co. at 402 N. Broadway is an 8-story building built in 1911, with brown brick trimmed in glazed yellow brick and terra cotta. Godfrey Co. was a grocery wholesaler that claimed to be the first in the lower Third Ward to combine wholesale groceries and fresh fruit and produce. They also claim to be the first to ship bananas in to Milwaukee. They roasted Silver Buckle brand coffee on the eight floor of this building. In 1926 James Godfrey founded IGA supermarkets and in 1953 this firm founded the Sentry grocery chain. Starting in 1949 Bruce Publishing, a printer of Bibles, occupied the building, then another religious firm, then LoDuca, which imported, exported, and retailed musical instruments.
- The Marine Terminal Building Warehouse at 120 N. Broadway is a 3-story warehouse designed by Albert Hecht of Chicago and built in 1917–18. It is located on the Milwaukee River, with good access to roads, Lake Michigan, and the downtown, having served as dock, warehouse, and offices for various businesses. The building was renovated and converted into residential condominiums by Milwaukee based developer Mandel Group and HGA Architects in 2006.

== Education ==
The school district is Milwaukee Public Schools.

== Transportation ==
At the Milwaukee Public Market
Preceding station	The Hop	Following station
St. Paul at Plankinton toward Intermodal Station	M-Line	Wisconsin Avenue One-way operation
Between Broadway and Milwaukee Street
Preceding station	The Hop	Following station
St. Paul at Plankinton One-way operation	M-Line	Wisconsin Avenue toward Burns Commons
Wisconsin Avenue One-way operation	L-Line	Michigan & Jackson toward Lakefront

== See also ==
- Gentrification
- Neighborhoods of Milwaukee
- Red Flower Rising
