= The Couture =

Building in Milwaukee, Wisconsin, United States

Coordinates: 43°02′14″N 87°54′00″W

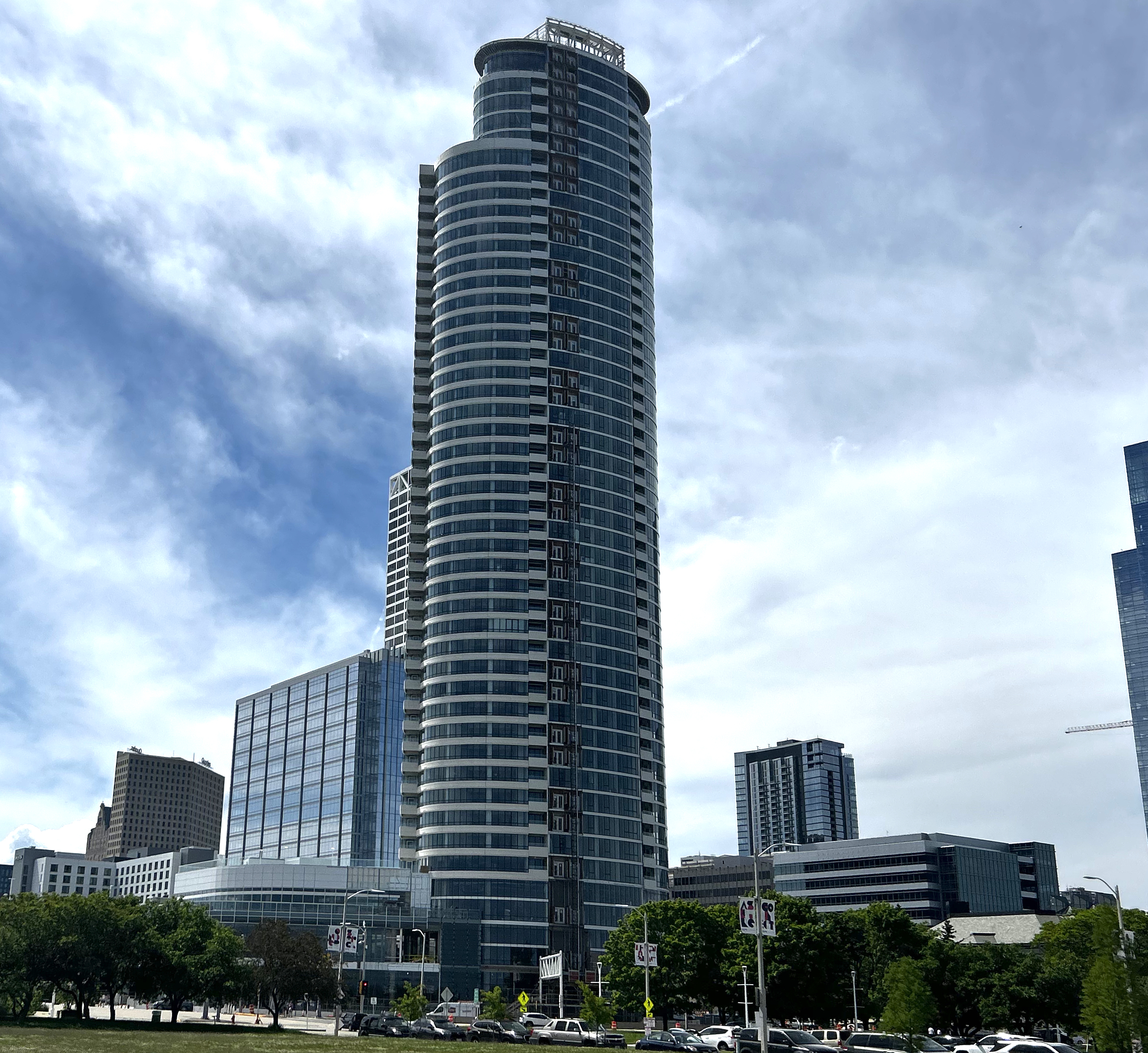
- Photographed in June 2024
- Interactive map of the The Couture area

General information
- Status: The Couture under construction
- Type: Residential
- Location: 909 E. Michigan Street; Milwaukee, Wisconsin; United States

Technical details
- Floor count: 44

Design and construction
- Architect: RINKA
- Developer: Barrett Lo Visionary Development

Other information
- Public transit: MCTS; The Hop

Website
thecouturemke.com
Lakefront
General information
- System: The Hop streetcar stop
Services
Preceding station	The Hop	Following station
Clybourn & Jefferson toward Historic Third Ward	L-Line	Michigan & Jackson One-way operation
Location

The Couture is a high-rise apartment building in Downtown Milwaukee, Wisconsin. The 507-foot, 44-story high-rise became the state of Wisconsin's tallest residential building upon completion in 2024, and features 322 high-end apartments, 50,000 square feet of restaurant and retail space, and an 1,100-space parking structure with hundreds of public parking spaces.

== History ==
First proposed in 2012, the project has undergone several programming and design revisions. The tower was originally expected to include a 180-room hotel, but that proposal was removed in 2014 with the construction of the neighboring Westin Hotel. The proposed 179 apartment units was increased to 294 apartments and later expanded to 322 apartments. In 2014, the developer and the city of Milwaukee revised the design to include an enclosed stop of The Hop. In 2015, the project went through litigation regarding the sale and demolition of the Milwaukee County Transit Center to the developer, Barrett Lo Visionary Development. In June, 2015 a Circuit Court judge ruled in favor of Milwaukee County and the developer allowing the sale to proceed. On June 26, 2020, the developer, Barrett Lo Visionary Development, announced equity funding had been secured earlier in the month and they had resubmitted the project for HUD funding.

The Couture began leasing apartments in January 2024. As of August 2024, the tower was 30 percent leased but was only 20 percent occupied by residents.

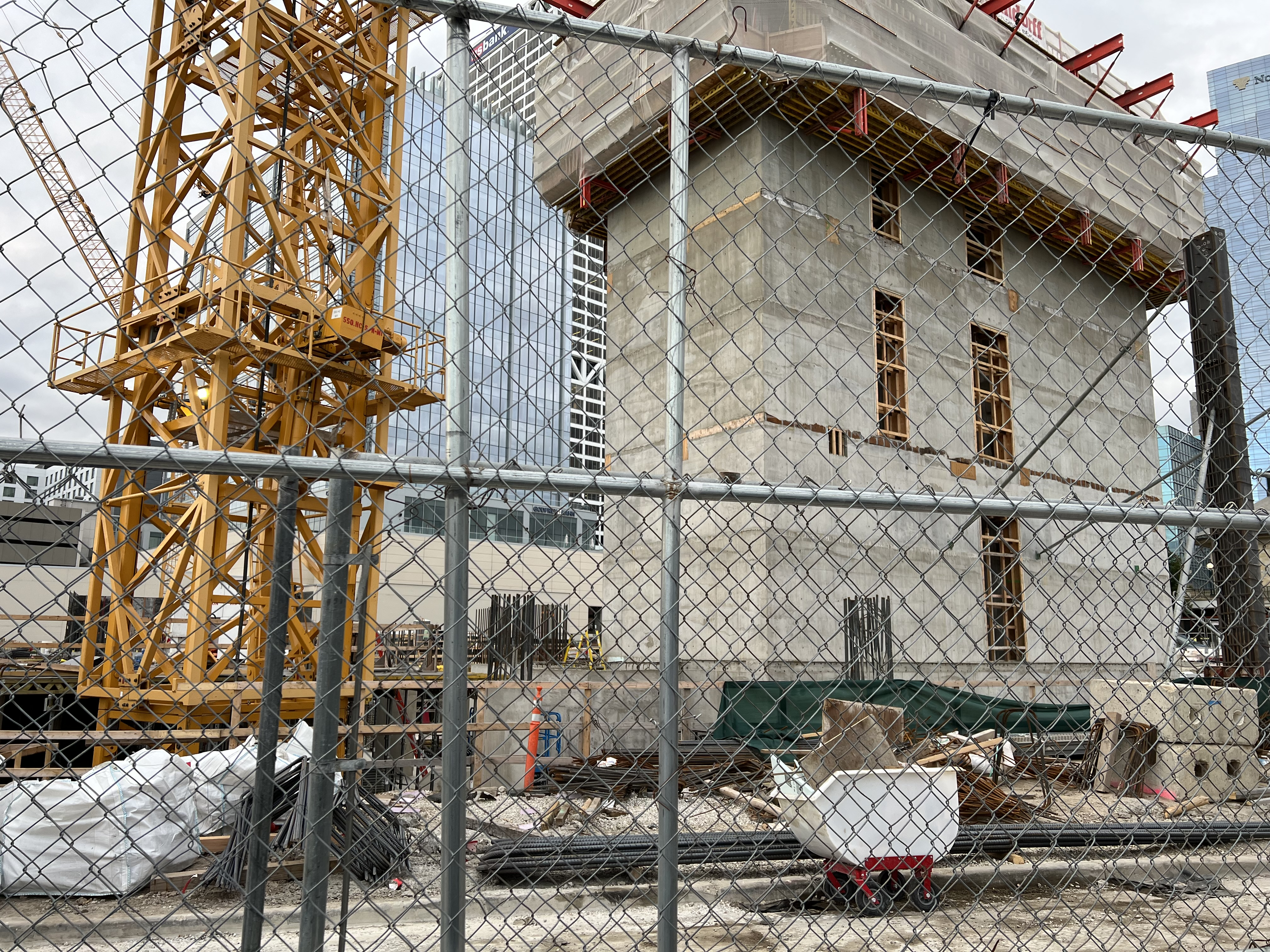
Construction of The Couture in September 2022

== Design and construction ==
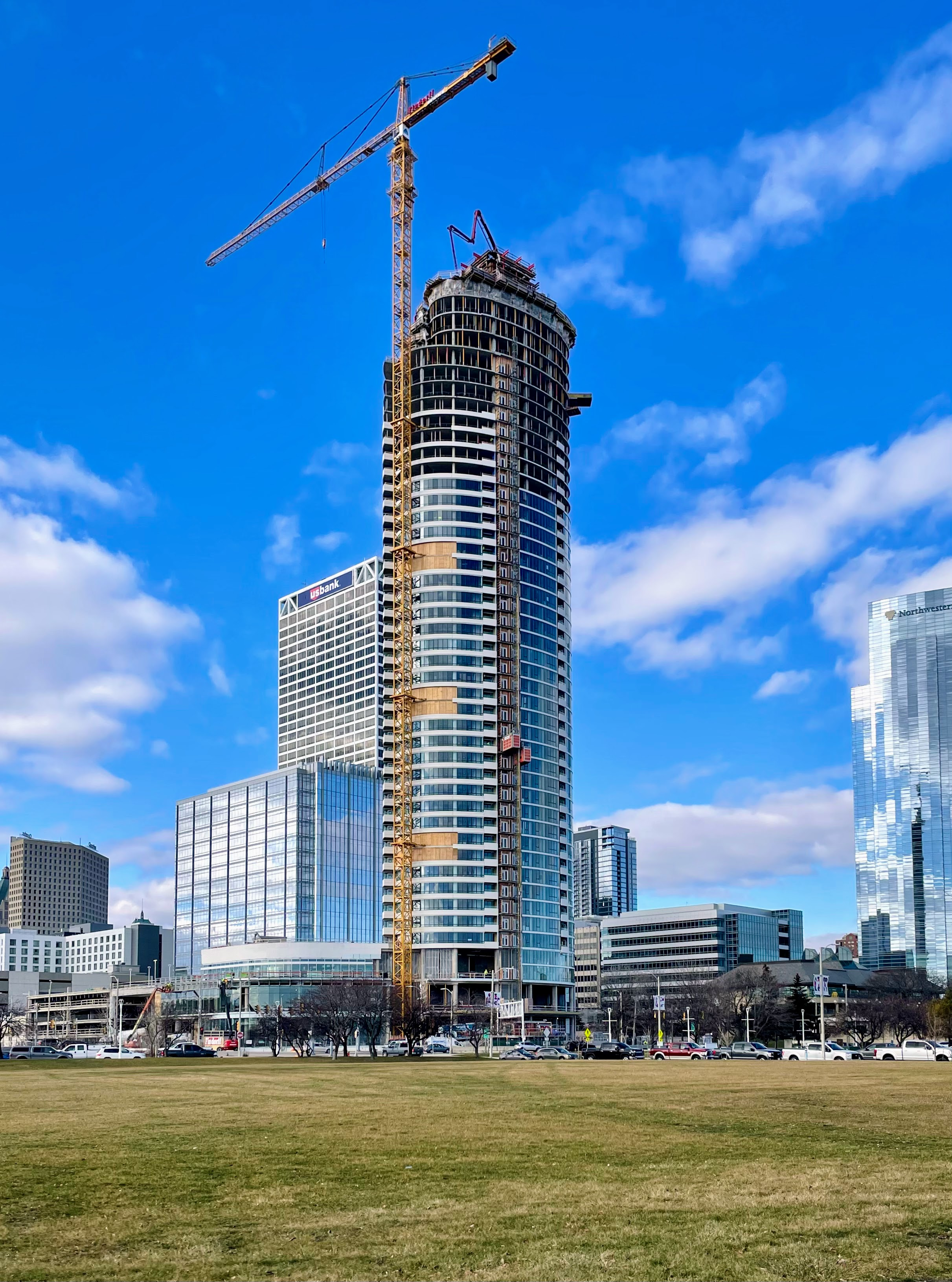
Photographed in January 2024

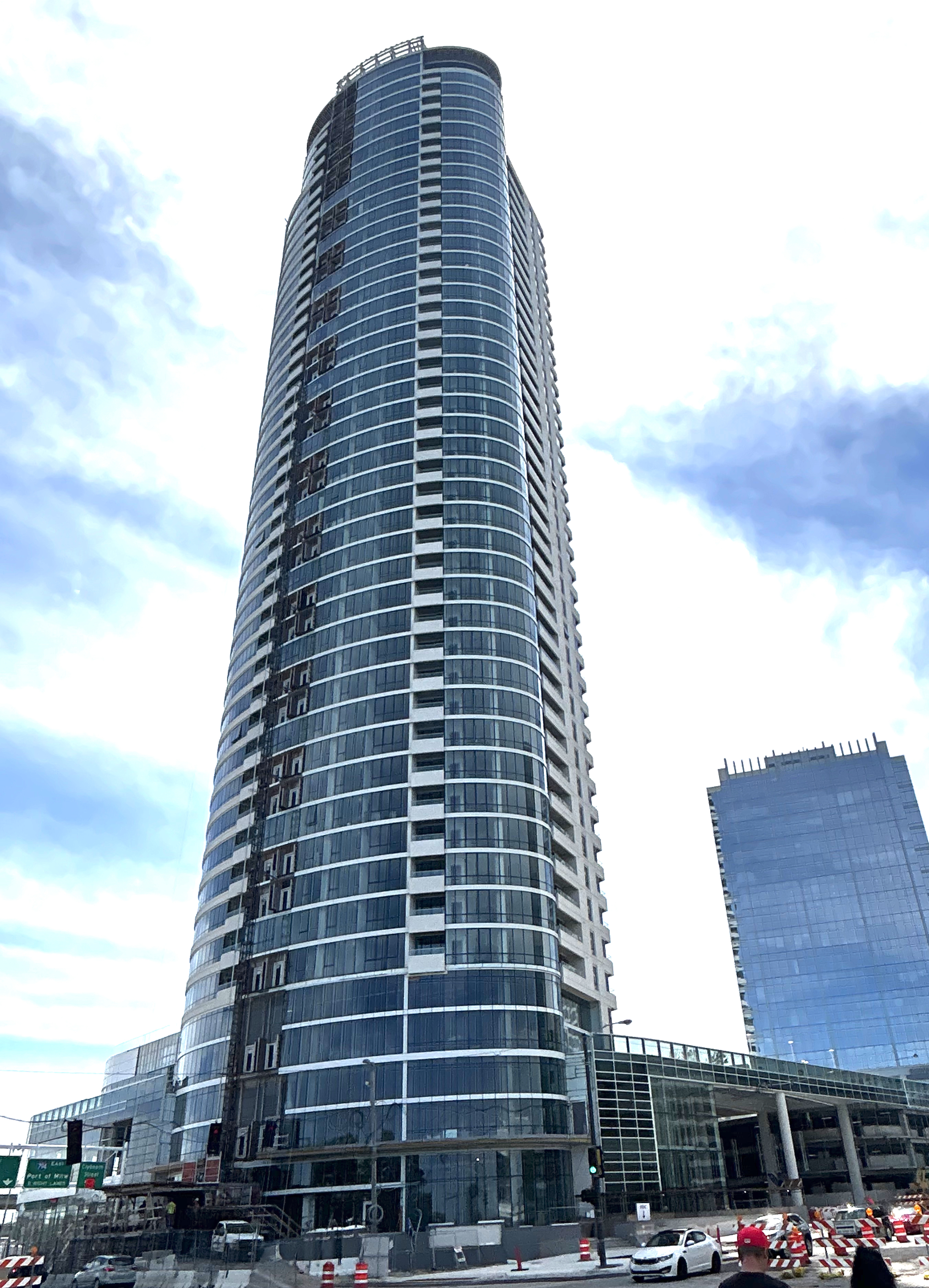
Photographed in June 2024

A groundbreaking event was held on June 16, 2021, with speeches by former Milwaukee Mayor Tom Barrett and Milwaukee County Executive David Crowley. RINKA is serving as the lead architect on the project with J.H. Findorff as the General Contractor. The tower went vertical in Summer 2022 after several months of site prep and underground work. In February, 2022, the developer announced an intention to complete the project by the end of 2023. The Couture is the 4th tallest building in the city of Milwaukee and the tallest residential building in the state of Wisconsin.

The base of the building contains a public transit concourse with a streetcar station for The Hop L-Line and a bus rapid transit station for Milwaukee County Transit System CONNECT 1.

== See also ==
- List of tallest buildings in Milwaukee
- List of tallest buildings in Wisconsin
