= Milwaukee Arts Board =

Government board of Milwaukee, Wisconsin

The Milwaukee Arts Board, is an arts board staffed by the Department of City Development, located in Milwaukee, Wisconsin, United States.

== Description ==
The Milwaukee Arts Board's, also known as MAB, mission is to enhance the development, cultural accessibility and enjoyment of the arts for Milwaukee's citizens. Each year they give out grants ranging from US$3,000–7,000 to projects administered by 501(c)(3) organizations that fulfill the board's mission. "The Arts Board provides a range of support to arts and community organizations that produce innovative projects or programs. Additionally, the MAB is committed to supporting public art projects that provide a sense of place, celebrating our community in city neighborhoods, parks and public places."

== Historical information ==
The Milwaukee Art Commission was created by the city in 1911. This commission was in existence until 1990, when Mayor John Norquist initiated the change from the Milwaukee Art Commission to the Milwaukee Arts Board and its first meeting took place on May 1, 1990.

The purpose of the Arts Board is: "To support the arts in the City of Milwaukee by:

1. direct financial support through a competitive grant process;
2. accepting, purchasing, commissioning, or providing partial funding for public art or art projects for the City's art collection with funds for the 'Percent for Art' fund;
3. serving as an advocate for the arts singly, or in concert with other Milwaukee arts' organizations and offering advice and recommendations to the design of new and remodelled (sic) City facilities and other infrastructure."

The Milwaukee Arts Board is composed of seventeen members appointed by the Mayor and confirmed by the Common Council. Each member serves a three-year term. One member needs to be a member of the Cultural, Artistic and Musical Programming Advisory Council. At least one representative of the Milwaukee Board of School Directors must be appointed, and there must be one member on the Common Council.

The Arts Board has been awarding an "Outstanding Artist of the Year" prize since 1995. Recipients include: Dinorah Marquez, C. Michael Wright, Lee Erickson, Ruth Schudson and Monty Davis, Sarah Prize, Jason Yi, Marie Kohler, Ray Chi, JoAnna Poelhmann, Raoul Deal, Berkeley Fudge, Mark Bucher, Kevin Stalheim, Marina Lee Meyer, Ferne Yangyeite Caulker, James & Rose Pickering, Reynaldo Hernandez, Jill Sebastian, Therese Agnew, John Schneider, Yergeniya Kaganovich and John Ruebartsch.
