= You Rise Above the World =

Public art sculpture at the Riverwalk in Milwaukee, Wisconsin

- Artist: Richard Taylor
- Year: 1998
- Dimensions: 300 cm × 150 cm × 120 cm (120 in × 60 in × 48 in)
- Location: Milwaukee Riverwalk; Milwaukee, Wisconsin; 43.041977°N 87.912221°W
- Owner: City of Milwaukee

You Rise Above the World is a public art work by artist Richard Taylor. It is located on the Riverwalk in downtown Milwaukee, Wisconsin. The artwork is a vertically oriented, abstract totem-like form painted bright red. It is located on the east side of the Milwaukee River on Kilbourn Avenue. The sculpture is sponsored by the Riverwalk Business Improvement District.

== See also ==
- First Flight
- All in the Air at Once
