= Milwaukee County Transit System =

Public transit operator in Milwaukee County, Wisconsin

- MCTS bus on North Avenue in Milwaukee
- Founded: June 1, 1975 (51 years ago)
- Headquarters: 1942 North 17th Street; Milwaukee, Wisconsin
- Service area: Milwaukee, Ozaukee, and Waukesha counties
- Service type: Bus; Bus rapid transit
- Routes: 48
- Stops: 4,591
- Stations: 2
- Depots: Fond du Lac Operating Station; Kinnickinnic Operating Station
- Fleet: 369 buses
- Daily ridership: 66,700 (weekdays, Q2 2026)
- Annual ridership: 25,328,400 (2025)
- Operator: Milwaukee Transport Services, Inc.
- Chief executive: Steve Fuentes
- Website: ridemcts.com

The Milwaukee County Transit System (MCTS) is the largest transit agency in Wisconsin, and is the primary transit provider for Milwaukee County. The agency ranks among the top 50 transit agencies in the United States in total passenger trips. The agency is partly managed by the quasi-governmental agency Milwaukee Transport Services, Inc. Its bus fleet consists of 369 buses. In 2025, the system had a ridership of 25,328,400, or about 66,700 per weekday as of the second quarter of 2026.

== History ==
Public transit operations began in Milwaukee in 1860. The service consisted of two horse-drawn cars. On June 1, 1975, Milwaukee County took over what had become a bus system run by the Milwaukee & Suburban Transport Company, a private operator, and established the Milwaukee County Transit System.

In 2009, Wisconsin Governor Jim Doyle proposed a three-county Regional Transit Authority that would incorporate MCTS. The proposal faced opposition from some lawmakers and the Regional Transit Authority was never created.

In late 2013 and into the early part of 2014, MCTS began debuting new technology onboard buses. This included introducing real-time bus information allowing passengers to track the exact location of buses, new fareboxes and an electronic fare system by virtue of a smart card (M•CARD), and a stop-announcement system complete with visual and audio information. Clever Devices is the provider of the real-time bus information and stop-annunciator system, whereas the new fareboxes were provided by Scheidt & Bachmann.

=== MCTS NEXT ===
In 2018, MCTS began a comprehensive study of the entire fixed-route system and began the process of implementing a new system with faster service, more connections, and easier-to-understand routes. Multiple community meetings and forums were held to get public input on the project. Before the project, only about 40% of the system was high-frequency routes, defined as routes on which buses come every 15 minutes during peak hours. The consensus from the study was that riders wanted faster service and were willing to walk the extra distance to bus stops. MCTS presented two options – transition the system to an 80-20 model, meaning 80% of the routes would be high-frequency, or a 60-40 model with 60% of the routes high-frequency, the latter being what the public ultimately decided on. MCTS analyzed every bus stop in the system and removed some lightly used bus stops to speed up service. The system overhaul was implemented in three phases during 2021, starting on March 7. This first phase included modifications to several routes and introduced two new ones. The second phase, starting on June 6, 2021, involved changes to the PurpleLine and various numbered routes, plus four new additions. The final phase started on August 29, 2021, affected the BlueLine and multiple other routes, added three new ones, and retired two lines. Ridership increased by 14% after the first phase was implemented.

=== Response to COVID-19 ===
Due to the COVID-19 pandemic, face masks were required on all MCTS buses. In the early stages of the pandemic, there was a limit of 10 passengers per bus, which was increased to 15, but that increase was rescinded on July 1, 2021. Passengers were encouraged to limit interaction with the bus driver, exit through the back door, and use contactless fare forms, such as the M•CARD or the Ride MCTS app.

== Fare Collection ==
In mid-2023, MCTS transitioned from the M•CARD pass scheme to the WisGo smartcard and Umo mobile app. The M•CARD became invalid on October 1, 2023. A non-expiring stored value system replaced fixed-period passes, and the previous Go Pass and reduced fare programs were merged. Tap-to-pay validators replaced the prior method of presenting codes to transit personnel for mobile app users.

As of 2026, the system supports digital payments through various credit card and mobile payment methods. WisGo and Umo users receive free time-based transfers. Fare capping is also a core feature, limiting fares to set daily, weekly, and monthly maximums. On-board cash payments remain an option, but do not qualify for transfers or fare capping.

=== U-Pass and Commuter Value Pass ===
As part of the overhaul, the previous U-Pass system was replaced by U-Pass WisGo. This separate smartcard provides students in Milwaukee County with unlimited rides through participating universities and colleges. Commuter Value Pass (CVP) users receive a similar employer-issued WisGo card, retaining the same benefits as the original program. Both U-Pass and CVP WisGo holders may also use the Umo app.

== CONNECT and MetroEXpress ==
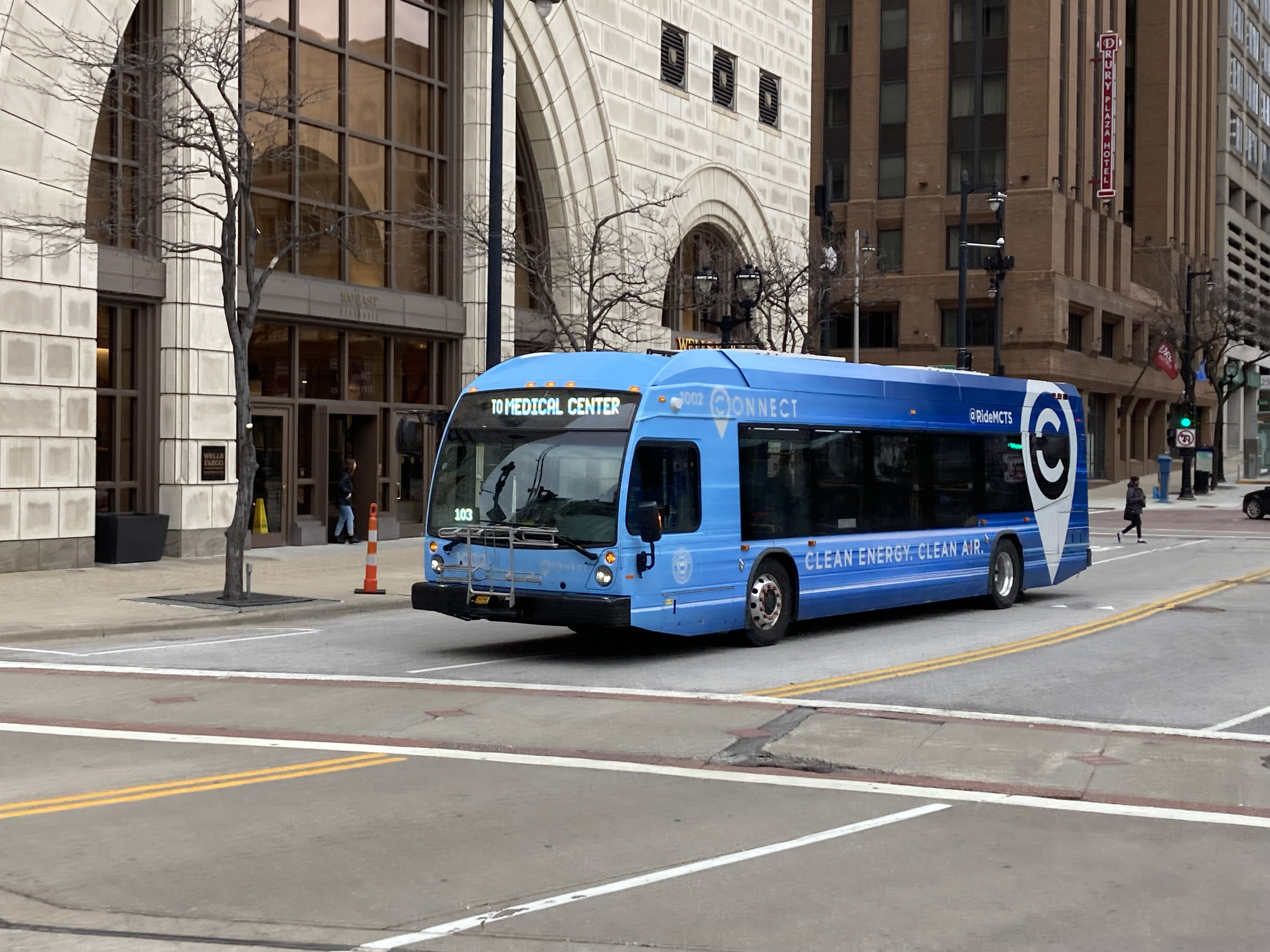
MCTS Nova Bus LFSe+ serving the CONNECT 1 BRT route.

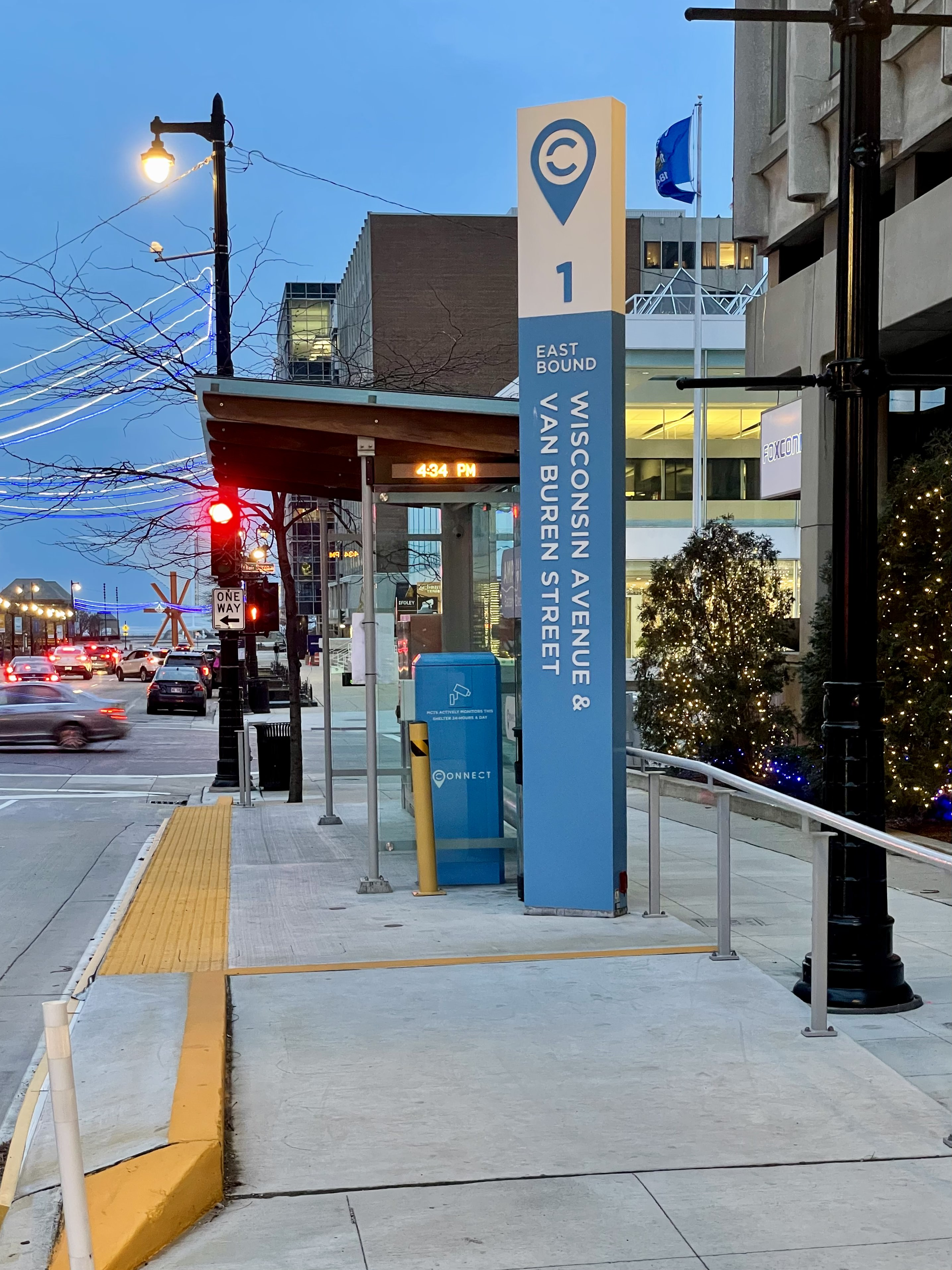
A CONNECT 1 station in downtown Milwaukee.

Connect1 bus serving the transit center at The Couture on the first day of service to the station (June 2, 2024)

Beginning in early 2012, MCTS introduced express bus routes under the brand MetroEXpress. The GreenLine, RedLine, PurpleLine, and BlueLine routes generally feature wider stop spacing and more frequent peak service compared with regular routes.

The East-West bus rapid transit (BRT) line, now known as CONNECT 1, is a 9-mile (14 km) route serving the most heavily traveled corridor in the region. The line runs primarily along Wisconsin Avenue in Milwaukee and Bluemound Road in Wauwatosa. It connects Downtown Milwaukee and Marquette University through the city's west side to the Milwaukee Regional Medical Center. Project plans were finalized in 2018 and subsequently received federal approval. MCTS utilized a Small Starts Grant Agreement from the Federal Transit Administration, financing nearly $50 million of the $55 million project total. It also features battery-electric buses, off-board fare collection, unique signage/bus shelters, with dedicated travel lanes along portions of the route.

On March 11, 2021, MCTS announced they had selected the Nova Bus LFSe+ battery-electric buses for the line, most of which are used for the service. MCTS was the first transit system in the United States to purchase the model. The delivery of the first buses was significantly delayed due to supply chain issues, with the first being delivered in October 2022. In 2023, the vehicles were temporarily pulled from service due to a battery recall. Nova Bus replaced the parts under warranty, and all were eventually returned to service. CONNECT 1 officially began service on June 4, 2023, operating between Downtown Milwaukee and Wauwatosa. It was the first BRT line in the state of Wisconsin; it was joined a year later by the Metro Transit Rapid A in Madison. The route operated fare-free until April 2024 due to equipment issues. Two months later, the line was extended to a station within The Couture parking ramp, which is shared with The Hop and other routes. Estimates indicate that the line will average more than 9,500 weekday riders by 2035. These figures represent a 17 percent growth in ridership along the corridor.

Route	Destination	Terminals	
CONNECT 1	Wisconsin–Bluemound BRT	The Couture	Watertown Plank P&R
BlueLine	Fond du Lac–Mill	Milwaukee Intermodal Station	Winfield/76th St
GreenLine	Bayshore–Airport (via Oakland–Howell)	General Mitchell Int'l Airport	Bayshore Town Center
PurpleLine	27th Street	College–Walmart; Loomis/29th St	Bayshore Town Center
RedLine	Capitol Drive	UW–Milwaukee	127th St/Capitol Metro Market

== Regular routes ==
The freeway flyer routes, including three numbered routes, as well as the Cream Puff Line (Wisconsin State Fair service), the Summerfest Shuttle, and the Brewers Line (game day services to American Family Field), were formally discontinued toward the end of 2022 due to a projected budget shortfall in 2025. The three "UBUS" routes continued normal operations. In 2023, MCTS operated two Summerfest freeway flyer routes from the College Avenue Park and Ride lot, and the Brown Deer Road East Park and Ride lot.

Milwaukee County Transit System – Current Bus Routes
No.	Name	Terminals	
11	Hampton Avenue	Hampton/Green Bay	92nd/Glendale
12	Teutonia Avenue	Milwaukee Intermodal Station	Service Road/Schroeder
14	Humboldt–Wisconsin	17th/Wisconsin	Bayshore Town Center
15	Holton–Kinnickinnic	Chicago/Drexel	Richards/Capitol
18	National–Greenfield	MSOE Viet Field (Broadway/Knapp)	Beyond Vision VisAbility Center; IBVI; Greenfield/124th
19	Dr. MLK Drive–S. 13th	Zellman Court (13th/College)	Florist/Teutonia
20	S. 20th Street	Edgerton/27th	2nd/National
21	North Avenue	Lake Drive/Water Tower; University of Wisconsin–Milwaukee	Mayfair Mall
22	Center Street	Humboldt/Locust	124th/North Ave
24	Forest Home–16th	Southridge Mall	MCTS Admin Bldg (17th/Fond du Lac)
28	108th Street	108th/Grange	Lovers Lane/Silver Spring
30	Sherman–Wisconsin	University of Wisconsin–Milwaukee	Florist/Teutonia
31	State–Highland	Milwaukee Intermodal Station	Mayfair Mall
33	Vliet–84th	Wisconsin/Cass	National/79th
34	Hopkins–Congress	Milwaukee Intermodal Station	92nd/Grantosa
35	35th Street	Layton/60th	Good Hope/Teutonia
51	Oklahoma Avenue	New York–Delaware/Oklahoma	Oklahoma/124th
52	Clement–Pennsylvania	Holt/Chase	Chicago/Drexel
53	Lincoln Avenue	Bay/Conway	Lincoln/114th
54	Burnham–Mitchell	Holt/Chase	National/112th
55	Layton Avenue	Layton/107th	Lipton/Kinnickinnic
56	Greenfield–Beloit	1st/Mitchell	Beloit/92nd–Oklahoma
57	Walnut–Appleton	Milwaukee Intermodal Station	Lovers Lane/Silver Spring
58	Villard Avenue	Green Bay/Florist	Villard/Appleton
59	Drexel Avenue	College–Walmart	Chicago/Drexel
60	60th Street	Layton/60th	Brown Deer Road/66th–Walmart
63	Silver Spring Drive	Bayshore Town Center	Lovers Lane/Silver Spring
66	Burleigh Street	Humboldt/Locust; University of Wisconsin–Milwaukee	Mayfair Mall
68	Port Washington–Capitol	University of Wisconsin–Milwaukee	Brown Deer East P&R
73	Mill Road	Florist/Teutonia	Brown Deer Rd/107th
74	S. 43rd St–Miller Park Way	Loomis/29th	35th/Wisconsin
76	76th Street	Southridge Mall	Northridge Lakes/76th
80	6th St–Green Bay Ave	General Mitchell Int'l Airport; MATC South Campus via Airport	Green Bay/Florist
81	Amazon–Oak Creek	Amazon MKE2 (Bartel Court)	Fond du Lac/35th–Burleigh (MCTS FDL Station)
82	S. 13th–Howell Ave	Zellman Court (13th/College)	Oak Creek (Centennial–Target)
88	Brown Deer Road	Service Road/Schroeder	Brown Deer Rd/107th
92	92nd Street	Layton/87th (84 South)	Brown Deer Rd/107th

=== Milwaukee Public Schools (MPS) routes ===
MCTS also runs additional services on days when the Milwaukee Public Schools are in session.

No.	Name	Terminals	
HF1	Howard Fuller Collegiate Academy via Rt. 12	Villard/Hopkins	Howard Fuller Collegiate Academy
HF2	Howard Fuller Collegiate Academy via BlueLine & Rt. 30	43rd/Silver Spring	Howard Fuller Collegiate Academy
RR1	Ronald Reagan High School via Rt. 19	Silver Spring/35th; 6th/Wisconsin	Ronald Reagan High School
RR2	Ronald Reagan High School via PurpleLine	Layton Blvd (27th)/National	Ronald Reagan High School
RR3	Ronald Reagan High School via BlueLine & Rt. 20	Fond du Lac/Congress	Ronald Reagan High School

== Other projects ==
=== North-South Transit Enhancement Project ===
Milwaukee County, MCTS, and the Southeastern Wisconsin Regional Planning Commission (SEWRPC) engaged in a study of the 27th Street Corridor. A considerable number of jobs, shopping centers, and medical facilities are located along this corridor, currently served by the PurpleLine. This project planned on enhancing transit along 27th Street by re-imagining the PurpleLine as a bus rapid transit line, which would add a second route to the CONNECT system. While the current PurpleLine is already an express route, it does not offer rapid transit service for the majority of the route, as numerous stops are 0.2 miles (1,100 ft; 320 m) apart. This was one of the aspects of transit in this corridor the project would have addressed. The project also aimed at addressing racial inequalities in the transit system, reduce reckless driving, attract new riders, and overall improve the quality of transit in this corridor.

However, in late August 2024, Milwaukee County officials recommended and later approved the shelving of the CONNECT 2 project for an indeterminate amount of time due to budgetary concerns. The pausing of the project, according to County supervisors, will allow MCTS to remain financially solvent until 2028.

== Fleet ==
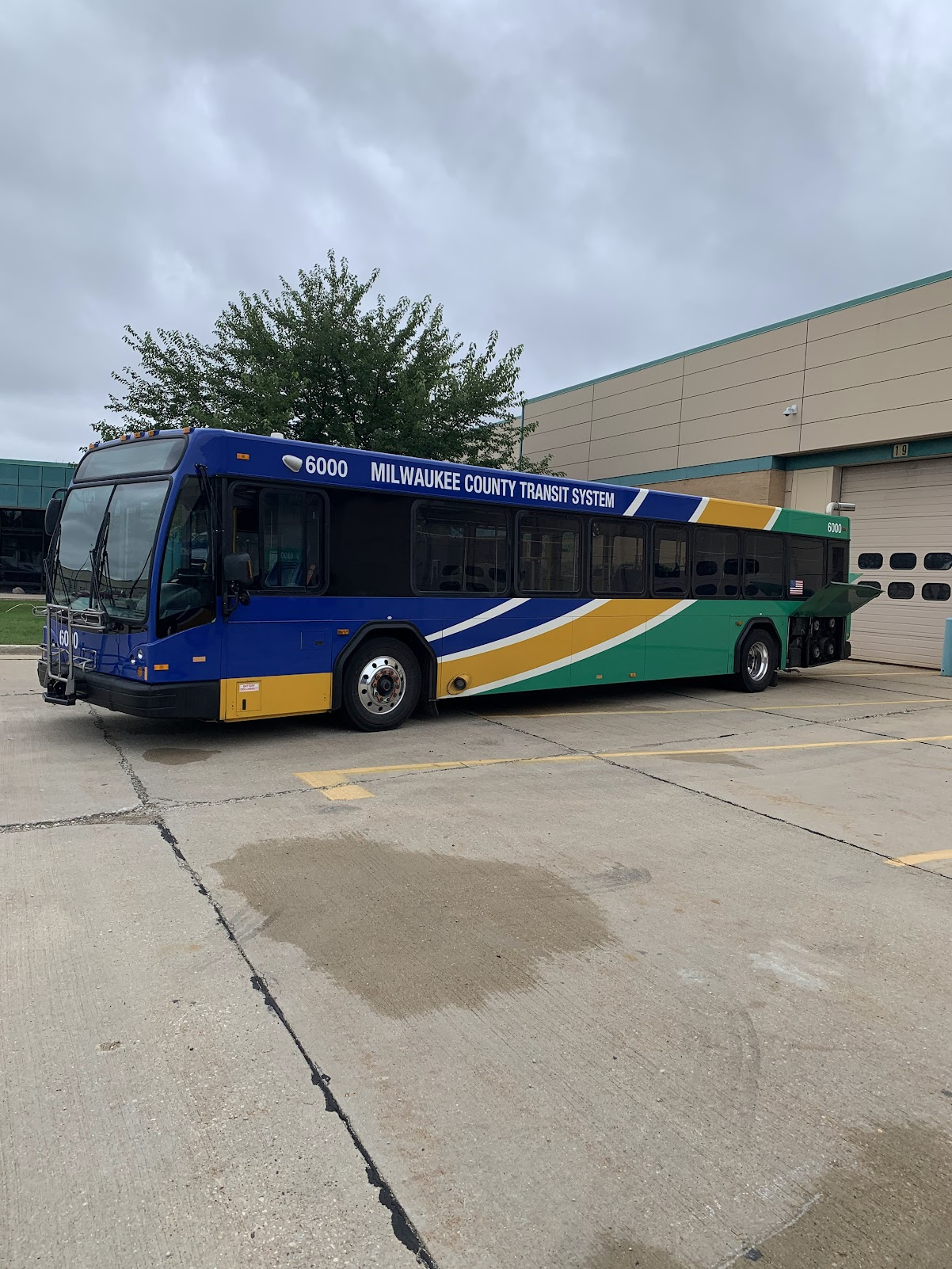
Gillig BRT Bus at the Fleet Maintenance Facility

=== Active ===
Make	Model	Delivered	Notes
New Flyer	XD40	2013-2017	2013 xd40's from some other transit systems.
Gillig	Low Floor BRT	2019-2022	Some part of single multiyear 73-bus fleet replacement order.
Nova Bus	LFSe+	Late 2022	The first order for LFSe+ buses in the United States, and Milwaukee's first battery-electric buses. Feature a unique livery for CONNECT services.
Gillig	Advantage	2024-2026	Newer buses feature the new light blue, yellow, and icons livery.

In May 2022, Milwaukee County applied for $55.2 million in federal grants to fund 32 battery-electric and 60 clean-diesel buses; the request was not awarded. Subsequent funding for fleet replacement included $8.4 million in state grants awarded in March 2023 for 16 battery-electric buses.

On March 19, 2025, MCTS introduced a new primary livery, replacing the blue, green, and yellow scheme used since 2010. The design uses a light blue, dark blue, and yellow pattern with stylized graphics depicting the Milwaukee Art Museum and the Hoan Bridge. Later that year, the system secured $8 million through the Congestion Mitigation and Air Quality Improvement (CMAQ) program. This included close to $6 million for 20 clean-diesel buses scheduled for delivery in 2027 and 2028. An additional $1 million in federal funding for bus replacements was announced in February 2026.

As of August 8, 2026, the 39 Gillig Low Floor clean-diesel buses have been delivered and placed into service.

=== Retired ===
See: Milwaukee & Suburban Transport Corporation for vehicles delivered pre-MCTS era.

Make	Model	Delivered	Withdrawn	Notes
Flxible	53102-8-1	1978	1991	
GMC	RTS-II	1980	2000	
Neoplan	N416	1982	1996	
Crown-Ikarus	286	1984	2000	60-foot articulated buses
Neoplan	AN440	1985-1987	2002	
Orion	05.501	1990-1991	2004	
Gillig	Spirit	1991	2001	
New Flyer	D40LFR	1996-2012	2026	
New Flyer	D30LF	1997	2010	
Gillig	Advantage	2002	2014	

== Ridership ==
Year	Ridership	Change over previous year
2014	40,028,664	▼6.93%
2015	39,313,138	▼1.79%
2016	40,256,308	▲2.40%
2017	34,606,044	▼14.04%
2018	30,429,788	▼12.07%
2019	28,972,674	▼4.79%
2020	15,595,089	▼46.17%
2021	14,356,646	▼7.94%
2022	15,557,421	▲8.36%
2023	17,137,300	▲11.31%
2024	25,300,649	▲47.6%

== See also ==
- The Hop
- Madison Metro Transit
- Waukesha Metro
- List of bus transit systems in the United States
