= All in the Air at Once =

Sculpture by Richard Taylor in Milwaukee, United States

- Artist: Richard Taylor
- Year: 2006
- Type: painted aluminum
- Dimensions: 550 cm × 180 cm × 180 cm (216 in × 72 in × 72 in)
- Location: Department of Public Works Field Headquarters; Milwaukee, Wisconsin; 43°05′14″N 87°57′25″W
- Owner: City of Milwaukee

All in the Air at Once is a public art work by artist Richard Taylor. It is located in front of the City of Milwaukee Department of Public Works (DPW) Field Headquarters northwest of downtown Milwaukee, Wisconsin.

== Description ==
All in the Air at Once is a brightly painted sculpture made of sheet aluminum that has been bent, cut and assembled in an elaborate vertically oriented composition. A cylindrical base rises and is topped with dramatic forms resembling ribbons and spheres. The entire work has icons cut out of the metal.

== Commissioning process ==
Department of Public Works staff member Tom Rowe led the process to select an artist for the commission, with participation from members of the Milwaukee Arts Board and community residents. The selection panel's primary criterion was that "the art should be uplifting." Funds for the work were made available through the City's Percent for Art Program as part of the construction of the DPW Field Headquarters.
