= Hotel Loraine =

Historic building in Madison, Wisconsin, US

- U.S. National Register of Historic Places
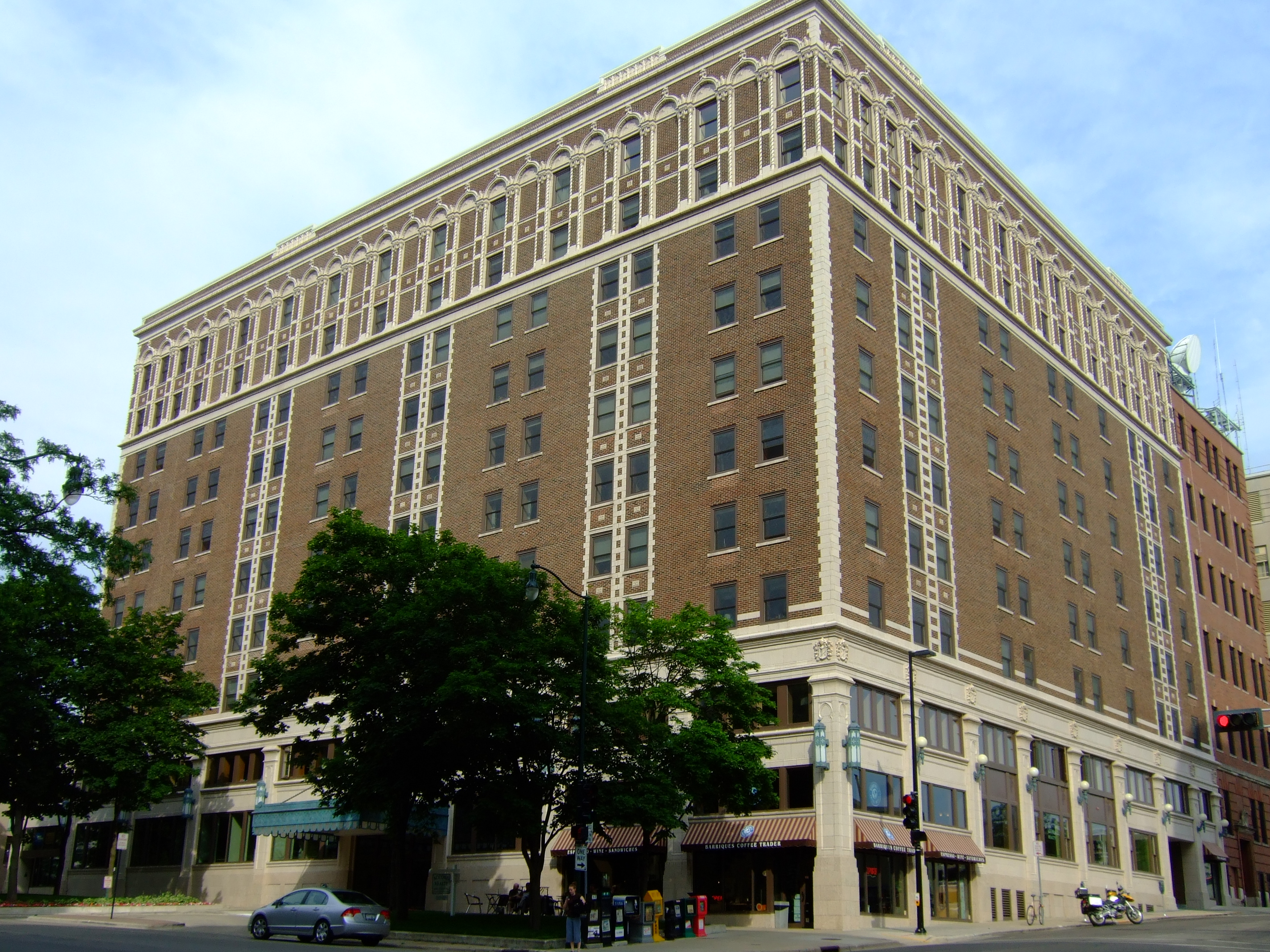
- The Loraine

- Location within Wisconsin Location within the United States
- Location: 119-123 W. Washington Ave., Madison, Wisconsin
- Coordinates: 43°4′23″N 89°23′8″W
- Area: less than one acre
- Built: 1924
- Architect: Tullgren, Herbert W.
- Architectural style: Late 19th and 20th Century Revivals
- NRHP reference No.: 02001125
- Added to NRHP: October 10, 2002

Hotel Loraine, also known as The Loraine, is a ten-story hi-rise built as a hotel in 1924 a block southwest of the capitol in Madison, Wisconsin. It was the city's leading hotel from the time of construction to 1968. In 2002 it was added to the National Register of Historic Places.

Walter Schroeder was a Milwaukee businessman who inherited his father's insurance, mortgage, and bond business in 1897. In 1912 he orchestrated the establishment of a rebuilt Wisconsin Hotel in Milwaukee. When it failed to make a profit, he took over management and turned it around. He decided he liked the hotel business, and proceeded to build a chain of large hotels in Wisconsin cities: the 1918-20 Astor on the Lake hotel in Milwaukee, the 1922-23 Hotel Retlaw in Fond du Lac, the 1923 Hotel Northland in Green Bay, the 1923 Hotel Wausau, the 1923 Hotel Loraine in Madison, the 1923-24 Hotel Duluth, and the 1926-28 Hotel Schroeder in Milwaukee.

By the 1920s, Madison was short on modern hotel rooms around the capitol square. The whole city had a total of 700 rooms, and the only existing first class hotel on the square was the Park Hotel, with 170 rooms. The Piper brothers completed the Belmont Hotel, in 1924, adding 200 rooms. Schroeder opened the Loraine in the same year. The Wisconsin State Journal gushed:

A million dollar hotel - the needed link between a $25,000,000 university and a $17,000,000 state house - is the Hotel Loraine, Wisconsin's newest hostelry and the leading one in the state outside of Milwaukee.

From the kitchen and baggage room to the beautiful Crystal ballroom, the new Loraine is sumptuously furnished and well appointed in every particular. The structure is patterned along the lines of the Northland in Green Bay, Wisc., and the Retlaw in Fond du Lac, Wisc. It is owned by the same company, the Hotel Wisconsin Realty Company, Walter Schroeder, president. It will be operated on the same plan and under the same policies that have made the Schroeder string hotels known from coast to coast.

Completion of the Loraine marks an important place in the history of Madison. For years conventions have shunned the beautiful Four Lakes city while festivities at the University of Wisconsin have had to be put up at homes, members of the legislature have had to room about the city in private residences and distinguished visitors have been subject to discomfiture because of lack of hotel facilities.

The Loraine will cater to all classes of the traveling public but will meet most favor with the intellectual classes which make their hub Madison. It will draw thousands of dollars in trade from medical circles for the new Wisconsin General Hospital erected by the state of Wisconsin at a cost of $1,500,000 which will open in September and several other clinics sponsored by church bodies are under construction.

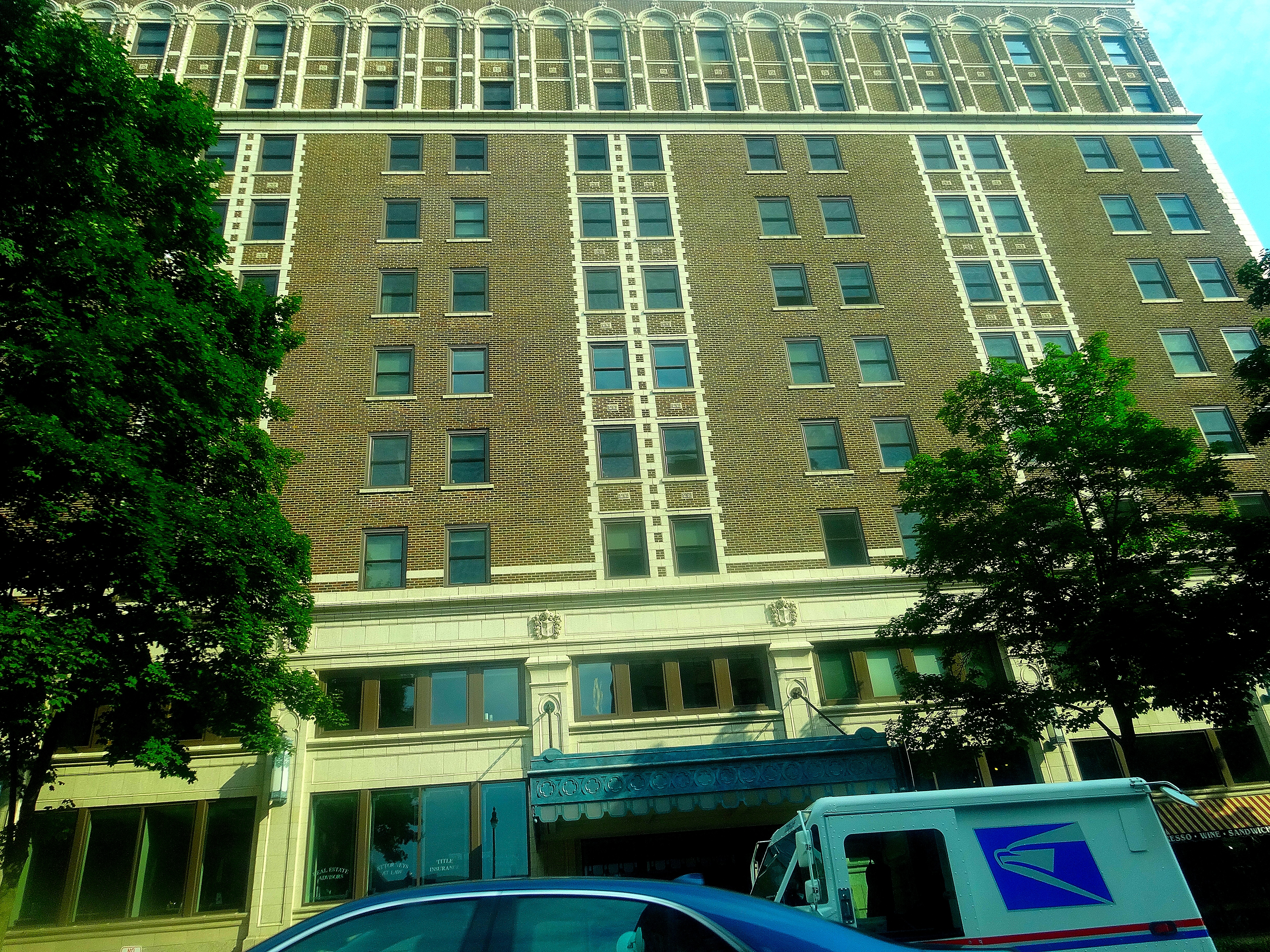

The Loraine was designed by architect Herbert W. Tullgren, along with several other Schroeder hotels. It rises ten stories, with a classical column concept where the first two floors are the base of the column, the middle six are the shaft, and the top two are the head. On the street side the first two stories are clad in buff-colored terra cotta tiles, with bays separated by pilasters with copper wall sconces. The middle six stories are clad in brown brick with terra cotta and limestone trim, with bands of trim running up and down. Then a terra cotta cornice leads to the top two stories which are clad in red brick trimmed with a terra cotta arcade. Inside the first two floors were public spaces: the foyer, registration area, cigar counter, the lobby, kitchen, and the two-story Crystal Ballroom where large social functions were held. The eight floors above held the guest rooms. The decoration draws from Gothic style, Mediterranean Revival, and perhaps Tudor Revival.

Schroeder named the hotel "Loraine" for his niece who had died while it was being built.

The Loraine opened in June of 1924, offering 250 guest rooms. Business was good, and the following year Schroeder added on another 100-room wing toward capitol square. For 45 years after the Loraine was Madison's largest hotel and hosted many of the city's biggest events. Over the years its guests include Gloria Swanson, Mae West, Ethel Barrymore, Harry S. Truman and John F. Kennedy.

In 1963 the hotel was remodeled and expanded again, to 400 rooms. In 1968 a group of local businessmen bought it from Schroeder and leased three stories as state offices. In 1988 the state took over the entire building as offices of the state Departments of Justice and Commerce. Those departments relocated to a newly constructed building in 2001. The building was then converted into condominiums which opened in 2004.

The building was added to the National Register of Historic Places in 2002 for its "prominent part in Madison's social and commercial life," and as an example of how Period Revival styles can be applied to a large public building.

== See also ==
- List of tallest buildings in Madison
