= Walter Schroeder =

American hotel magnate

- Born: May 19, 1878; Milwaukee, Wisconsin
- Died: July 18, 1967 (aged 89); Milwaukee, Wisconsin
- Occupations: Businessman, hotel owner, insurance agent
- Years active: 1899–1967 (insurance), 1915–1967 (hotels)

Walter Schroeder (May 19, 1878 – July 18, 1967) was an American hotel and insurance magnate, based in Milwaukee, Wisconsin.

== Early life ==
Schroeder was born in Milwaukee, the son of German immigrant Christian Schroeder, who founded the insurance company Chris. Schroder & Son in 1888. Walter Schroeder's formal education ended with the eighth grade and he began working at age 14 as a clerk in the Office of the Milwaukee Register of Deeds. Shortly after beginning work at the deed office, Schroeder also began working as a staff member of the Milwaukee Daily Reporter. Schroeder launched a competing paper two years later, the Daily Abstract, and later bought out the Reporter. When Walter's older brother, William, died unexpectedly in 1899, he gradually left the newspaper business to join his father's company in his place.

== Hotelier ==
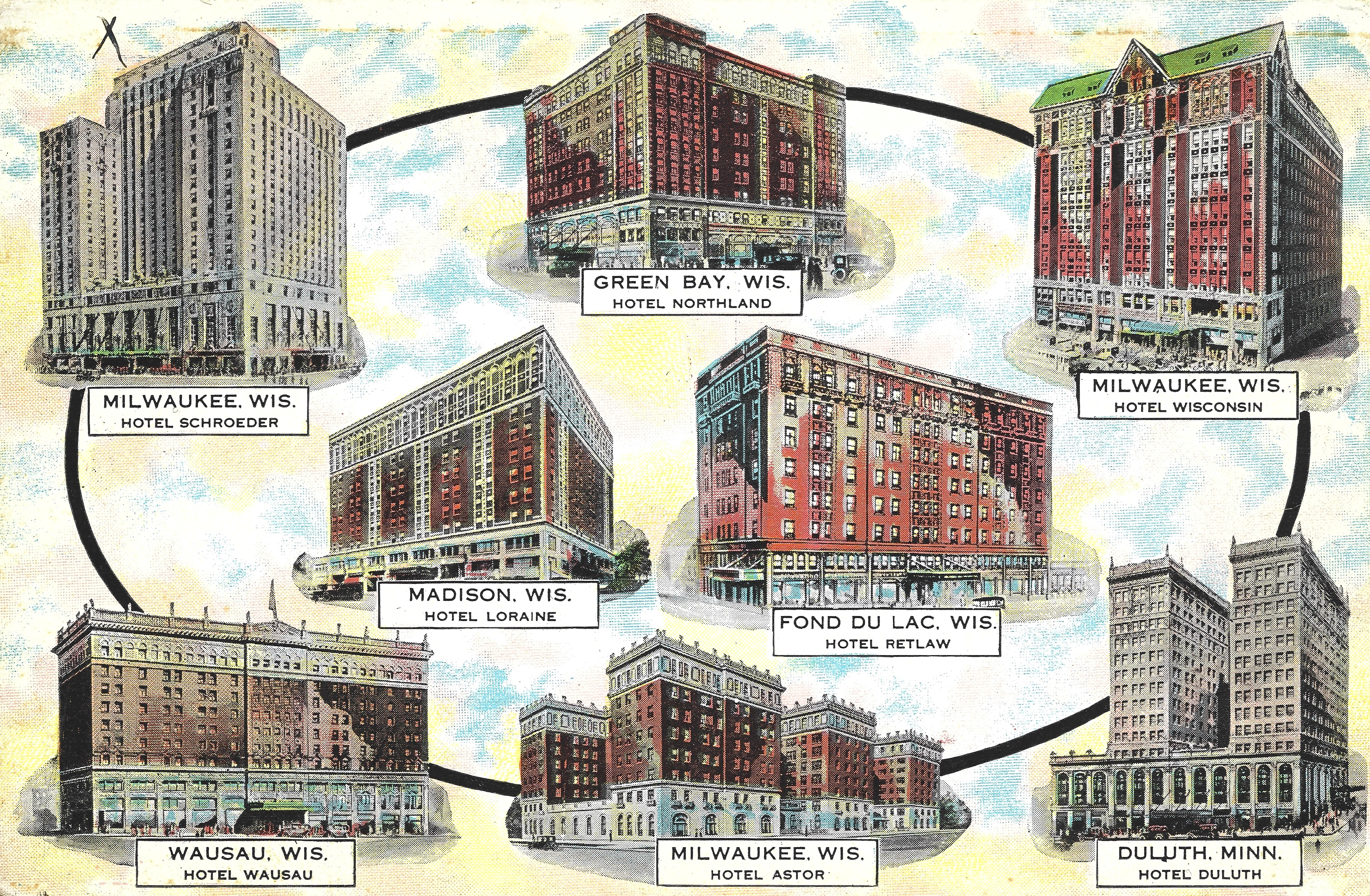
Potscard showing the various Schroeder hotels in Wisconsin and Minnesota, c. 1930s

In 1912, Chris. Schroeder & Son was asked to help finance construction of the Hotel Wisconsin, the largest of its kind in the state at that time, upon which Walter Schroeder decided to enter the hotel business. After relocating his father's insurance firm relocated to offices in the State Bank of Wisconsin building in 1913, and following Christian Schroeder's death two years later, Schroeder took the reins of the company and branched off into hotel management.

Over the next fifteen years, Schroeder spearheaded the construction or acquisition of several properties in Wisconsin and Minnesota. The Hotel Astor, near downtown Milwaukee, was completed in 1921, followed by the Hotel Retlaw in Fond du Lac in 1922. The Hotel Loraine in Madison opened in 1924 and was expanded just a year later. The Hotel Duluth in Duluth, Minnesota, Hotel Wausau in Wausau, Wisconsin, and Hotel Northland in Green Bay, all opened in 1925.

The Hotel Schroeder, was completed at the corner of 5th and Wisconsin Ave, Milwaukee, in 1928, becoming the largest hotel property operated by the firm and the largest hotel in the city. In addition, Schroeder purchased and renovated existing hotels, including the Hotel Calumet in Fond du Lac and Hotel Vincent in Benton Harbor, Michigan. The Hotel Wisconsin was also brought under the direct management of Schroeder through the Hotel Wisconsin Reality Company in the early 1920s and would remain in his possession for the following decades despite an operating deficit, suspicion of illegal transactions, and allegations of tax evasion made by the IRS in 1930.

Many of Schroeder's hotels were designed by architects Martin Tullgren and his son Herbert W. Tullgren (Astor, Retlaw, Loraine, Northland), while the Chicago-based firm Holabird & Roche was responsible for designing hotels Wausau and Schroeder.

Faced with declining health, Schroeder sold most of his hotels to investors and chains uring the last years of his life. The Hotel Schroeder, for instance, was acquired by Sheraton Hotels and Resorts in 1964.

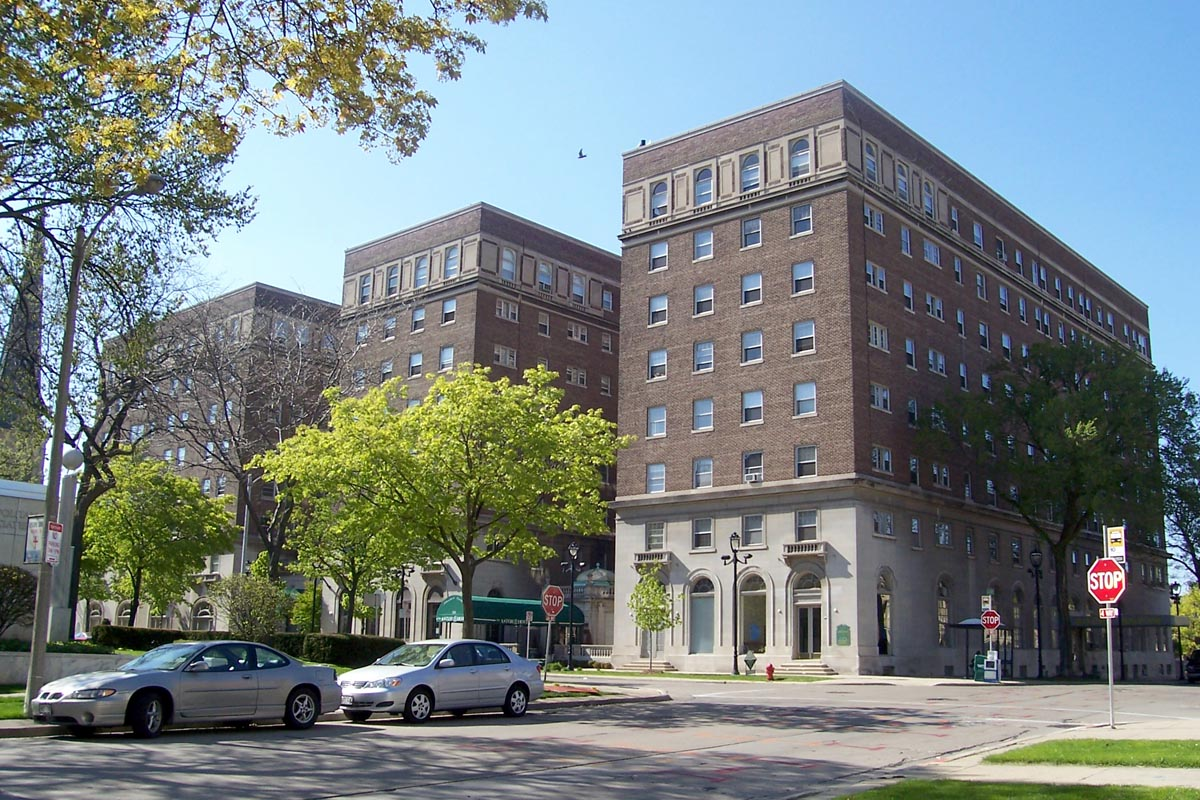
Hotel Astor, Milwaukee, 1921

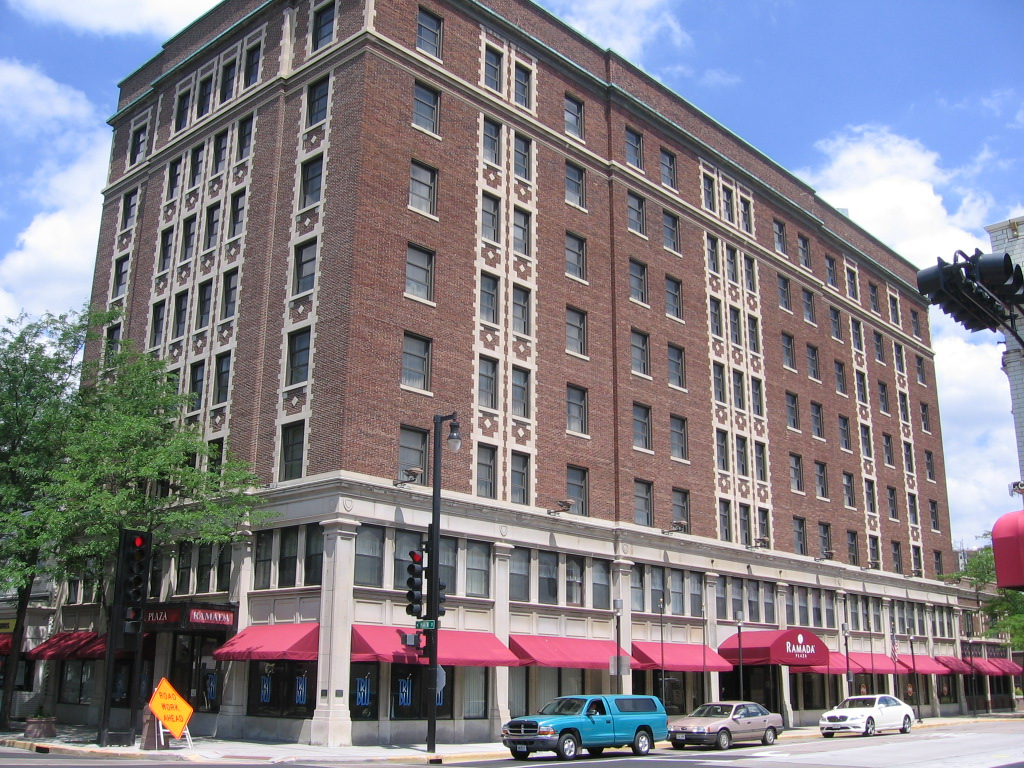
Hotel Retlaw, Fond du Lac, 1922

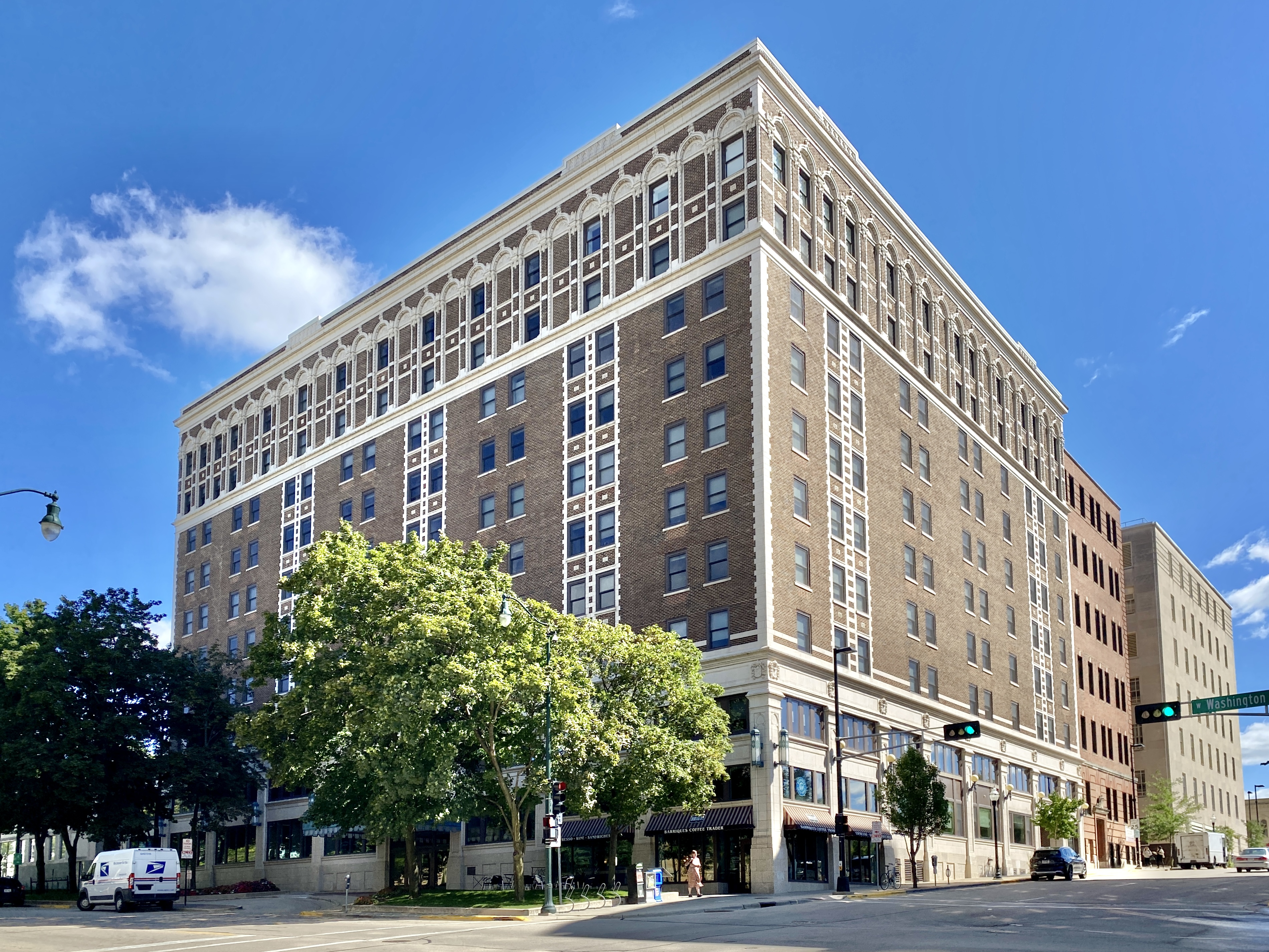
Hotel Loraine, Madison, 1924

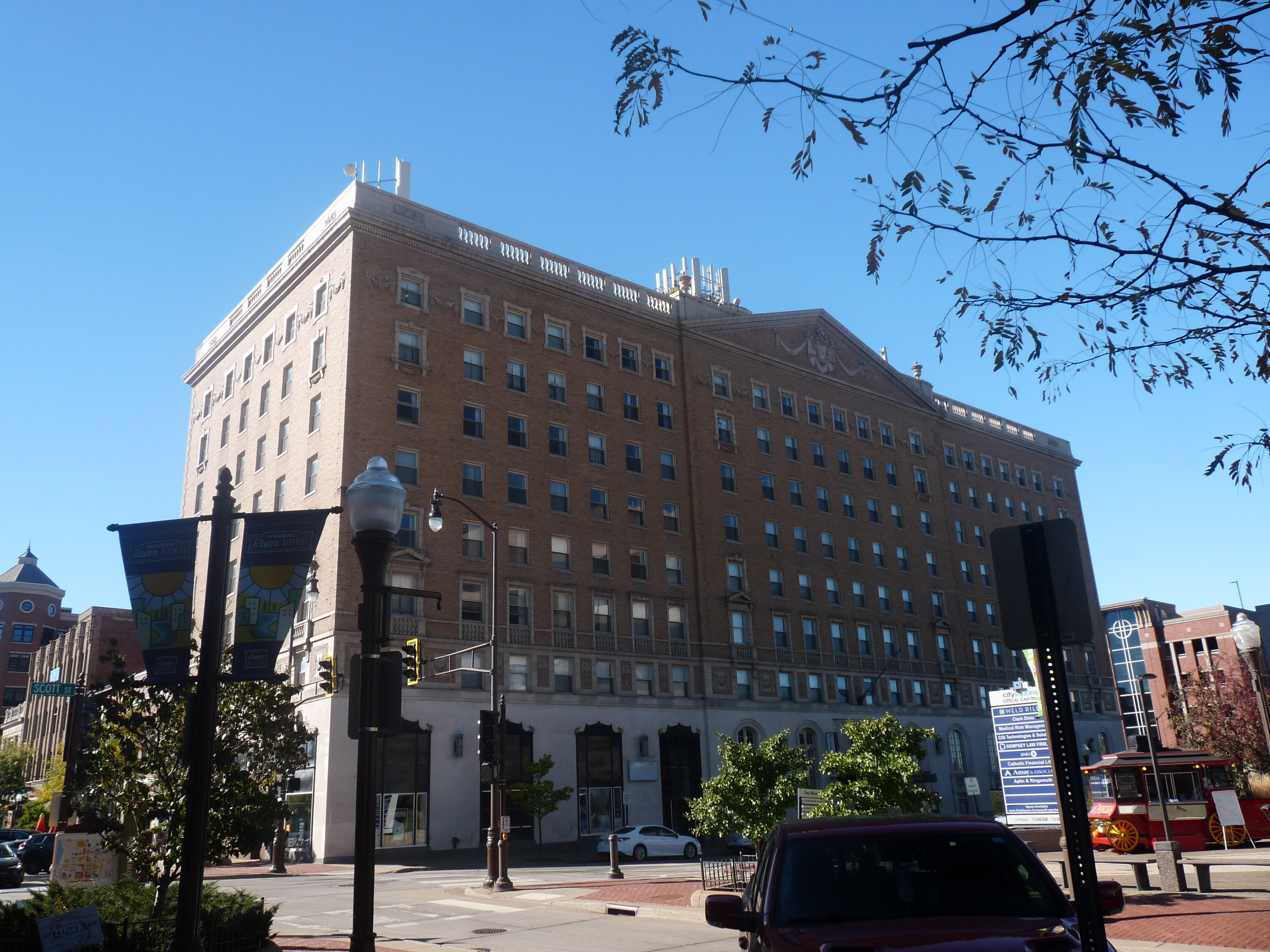
Hotel Wausau, Wausau, 1924-25

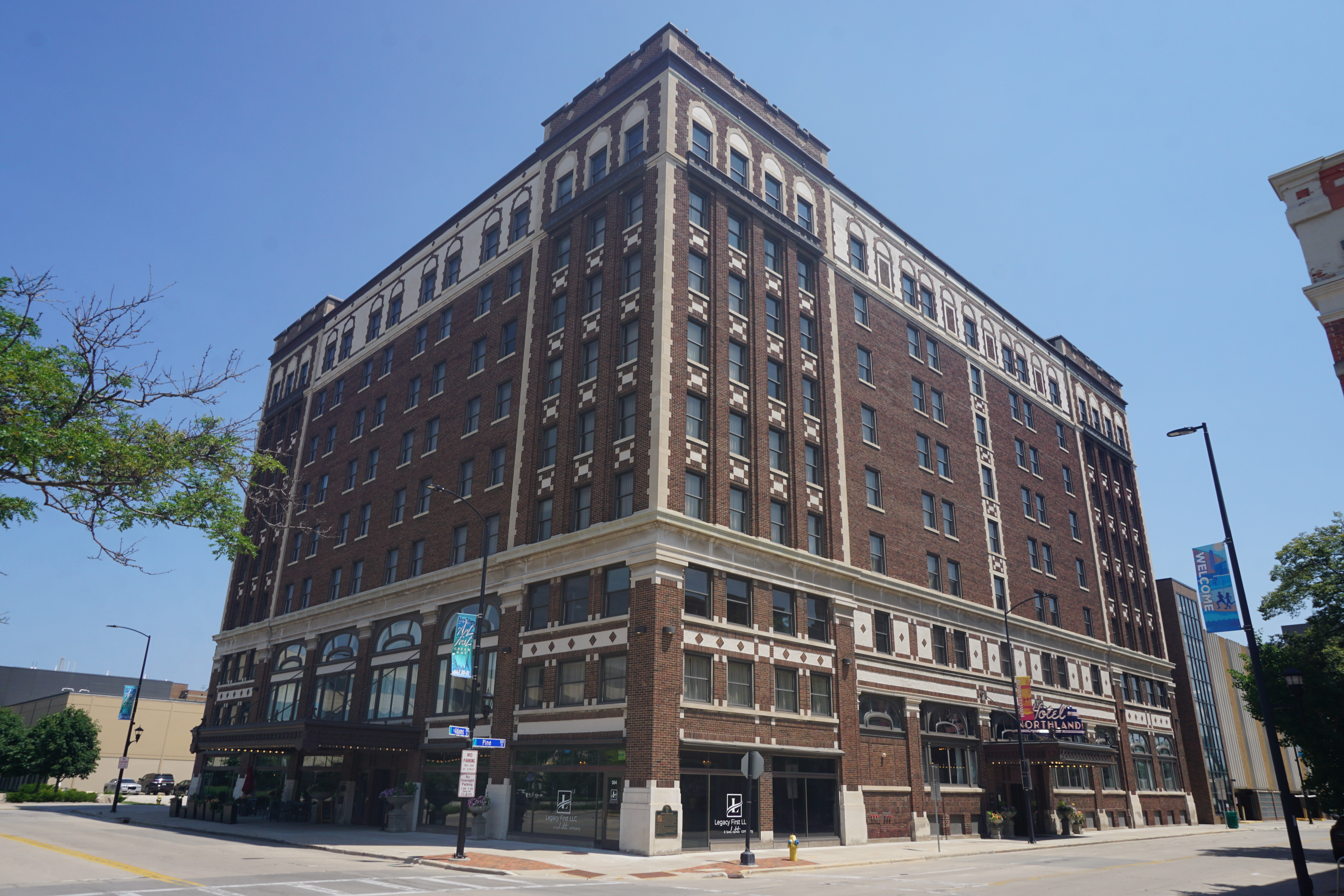
Hotel Northland, Green Bay, 1925

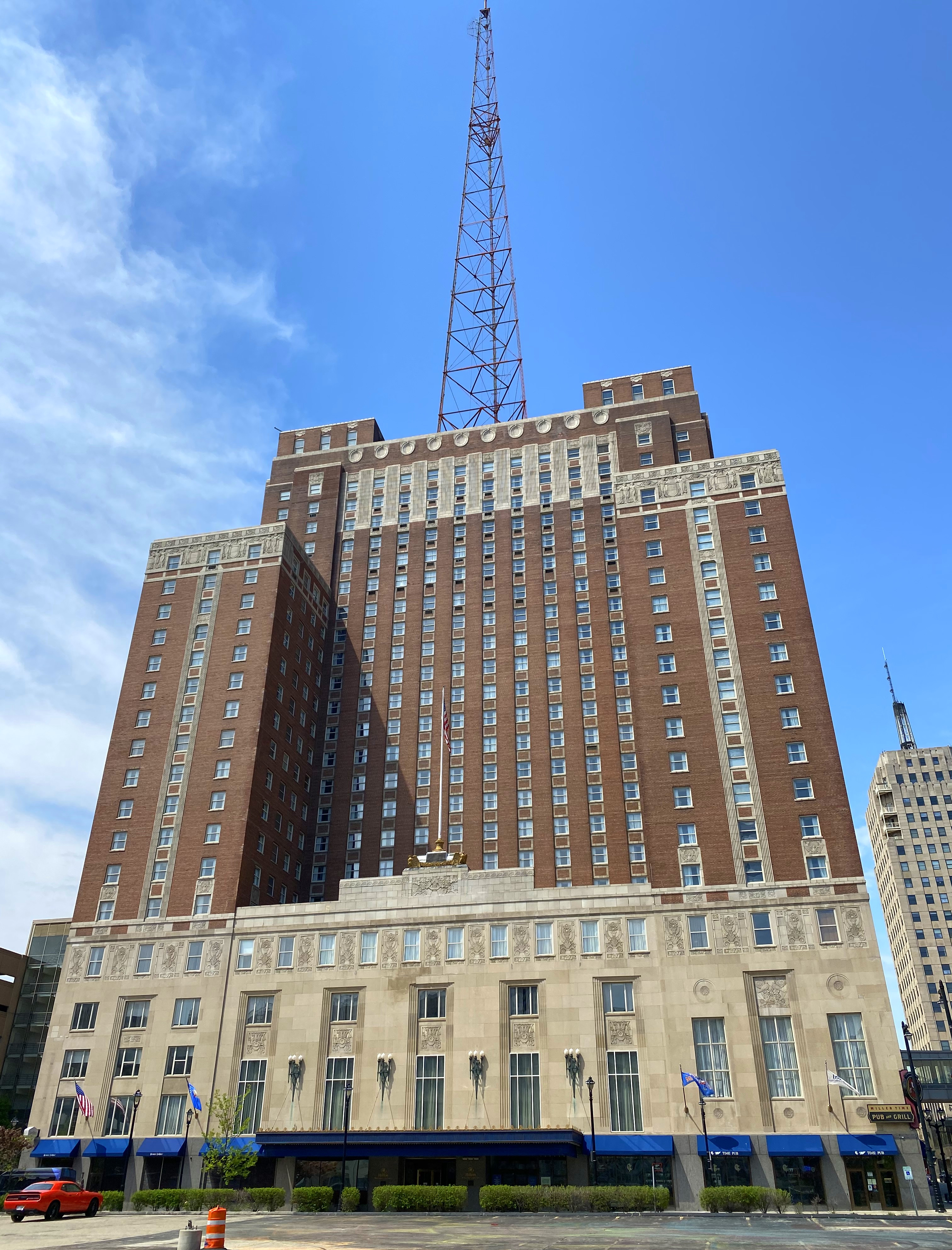
Hotel Schroeder (now Hilton Milwaukee), 1928

== Philanthropy ==
Schroeder's foundation provided a $3 million grant to help fund the Milwaukee School of Engineering's Walter Schroeder Library in 1978. Other facilities named after Schroeder include the Walter Schroeder Lounge at the Humphrey Scottish Rite Masonic Center and the Olympic-size Walter Schroeder Aquatic Center of the Metro Milwaukee YMCA, in Brown Deer. He was also a Marquette University benefactor and seven-year member of the Board of Governors. The Schroeder Hall dormitory is named for him, opening in 1957 and renovated in 1992. Initially a men’s residence hall, it became coed in 1973.

== Ghost ==
Schroeder's ghost is said to haunt several locations, including the Hotel Retlaw, Aquatic Center, Hilton Milwaukee, and Schroeder Hall at Marquette University.
