= King's Fair (Minneapolis) =

Horse race at King's Fair 1880

King's Fair, a precursor to the Minnesota State Fair, was held in South Minneapolis from 1877 through 1882. Since 1979 the name has also been used for a biennial gathering in the Seward neighborhood.

The 19th century fairgrounds ran from 24th Avenue in the west to 30th Avenue in the east and from Franklin Avenue in the north to 24th Street in the south. They included a racetrack, amphitheater and exhibition halls for agriculture and industry. Two highlights of the fair were an 1878 appearance by President Rutherford B. Hayes and the 1881 ascent of a hot-air balloon en route to the East Coast. Despite an impressive launch, the flight ended a few miles away in Ramsey County. The businessman and civic leader William S. King was a sponsor and organizer of the expositions.

King's Fair is today remembered with a celebration at Matthews Park, which is located on the site of the original fair. The event takes place in September of odd-numbered years.

== Glossary ==
- King Field: neighborhood in South Minneapolis named after William S. King, whose borders extend from Lyndale Avenue in the west to Interstate 35W in the east and from 36th Street in the north to 46th street in the south.
- King's Highway: section of Dupont Avenue in South Minneapolis honoring William S. King.
- King's Hill: popular sledding hill at Lyndale Farmstead Park.
- Lyndale Avenue: Minneapolis street taking its name from Lyndale Farm, a 1,400-acre estate owned by William S. King.
- Lyndale Farmstead Park: recreational area at 39th Street and Bryant Avenue South that was part of a vast farm belonging to William S. King and named for his father, Rev. Lyndon King.
- Northrup-King Seed Company: prominent Minnesota business, whose founders included William S. King and his son Preston.
