= Herbert W. Tullgren =

American architect (1889–1944)

Herbert Wallace Tullgren
- Born: July 5, 1889; Chicago, Illinois
- Died: February 23, 1944 (aged 54); Milwaukee, Wisconsin
- Citizenship: American
- Education: Staunton Military Academy
- Occupation: Architect
- Years active: 1908–1944
- Buildings: Astor Hotel, Hotel Northland, Wisconsin Consistory Building

Herbert Wallace Tullgren (July 5, 1889 - February 23, 1944) was an American architect active from the 1910s-1944. He was centered in Milwaukee, Wisconsin, but his work can be seen in different locations throughout Wisconsin, such as Whitefish Bay, Waukesha, Shorewood, and Fond du Lac. His designs made use of Art Deco and Art Moderne, which were popular during the time. Tullgren was the foremost Milwaukee architect practicing in the Art Deco and Art Moderne styles of the early twentieth century.

== Biography ==
Tullgren was born in Chicago, Illinois, the second child of Martin and Barbara (née Kregness) Tullgren. In 1894, Martin Tullgren caught the gold rush fever, and left Chicago with his family to become a prospector in Black Hills, South Dakota. Later, he would work as a superintendent of the mines for the Storm Cloud Mining Company in Arizona. The family lived in Maple Gulch and used a mule as a means of transportation. By the end of the Tullgren's time in Arizona, Martin worked at Homestake Mining Company building and assisting in timbering and supporting of galleries.

In 1900, the family moved back to Chicago, where Martin, along with Chicago partner Archibald Hood, set up their own practice architecture firm, Hood & Tullgren. The pair received contracts from people/companies such as United States Supreme Court Chief Justice Melville Fuller, Montgomery Ward & Co., and other leading firms in Chicago. By 1902, they had moved their business, and Martin's family including Herbert, to Milwaukee. Herbert, under Hood & Tullgren, began his architectural training with his father, which proved to be the only formal architectural education he would receive.

In 1907, at age 18, Tullgren left Milwaukee to attend Staunton Military Academy in Staunton, Virginia. However, he only spent a year there. Afterwards, he began work as a draftsman with his father's partnership, Hood & Tullgren. By 1909, the partnership had dissolved, and Martin began a new practice, Martin Tullgren & Sons, with both sons, Sven Minard and Herbert. Tullgren took only a short break from 1917 to 1919, when he joined the Wisconsin State Guard as a Captain-Adjutant during World War I.

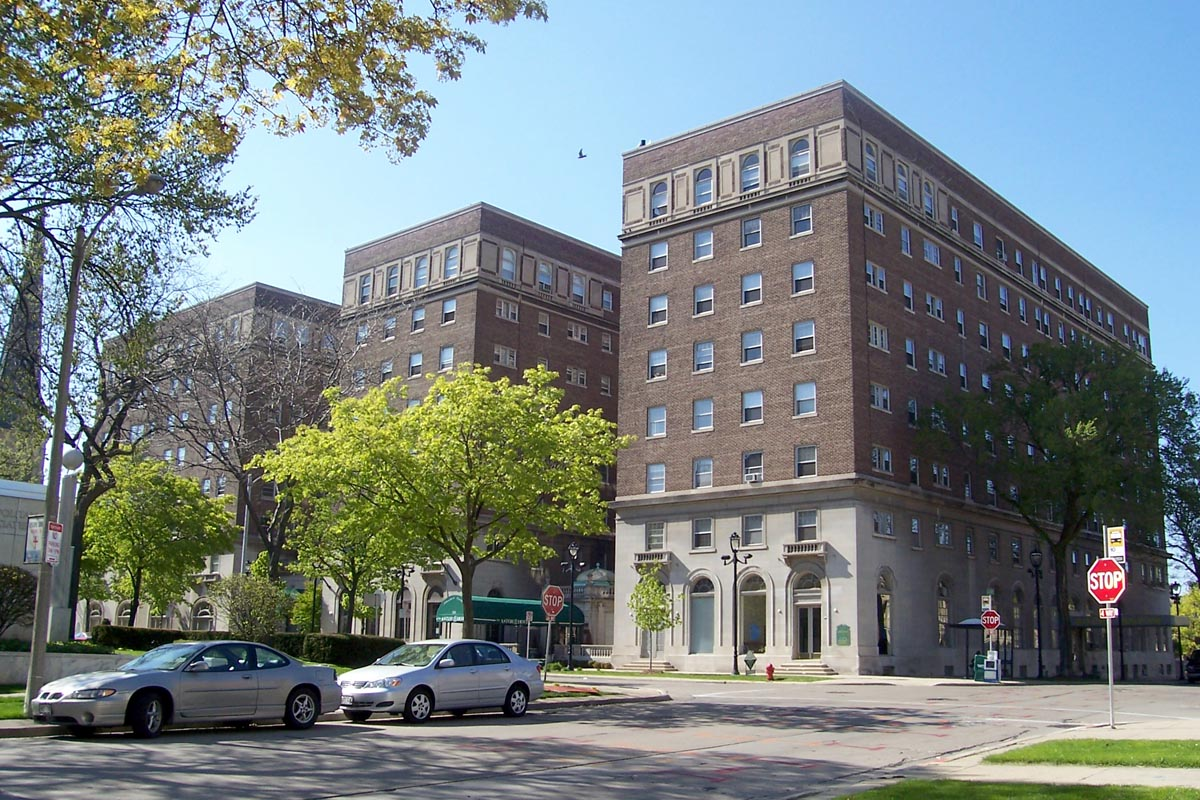
Astor on the Lake, Milwaukee, Wisconsin

Under Martin, the firm designed buildings such as the Downer Theater, Astor on the Lake, and Hotel Retlaw. However, by 1922 Martin, who had been ill for several months, died at the age of 64, leaving Tullgren to take charge of the office. This included design, office practice, and supervision, thus making him president of the firm by 1926 to 1936, before the firm dissolved.

During the 1920s, Tullgren also started other companies alongside the family firm. In 1923, he founded the Terra Company, a real estate company, along with Minard as president, and carpenter Emil Grossmann as vice president. Then sometime in 1927 or 1928, he founded Herbert W & S. Minard Tullgren, Inc., another real estate company. This put Tullgren as president, and Minard as vice president. However, in 1928 after Minard's death, Pansy, Minard's widow, became vice president of Herbert W & S. Minard Tullgren, Inc. While Tullgren remained president of that company, he became the treasurer of Terra Co., and Emil Grossmann became president.

By the 1930s, Tullgren was a well established architect having designed multiple office buildings, apartments, hotels, theaters, and even schools. In the early 1930s, Tullgren shifted his sights to building affordable middle to working class urban housing. He even patented, Patent No. 1896734, the duplex (two-story) apartment design, in 1933 after finishing the Viking Apartments in 1931. Tullgren was sure of the economic and functional advantages of his design. The Viking Apartments proved this by setting a record for occupancy during hard times at 92%, when the national average for apartments was only about 60%.

Confident in the benefits of duplex apartments, Tullgren published a pamphlet in 1937,The Tullgren Plan for City Housing, to further describe the social and economic benefits. The floor plans included a living room, dining room, and a kitchen on one floor, and sleeping quarters and a bathroom on the floor above. Public corridors were not required on the sleeping quarters floor, and thus creating more space. In fact, it would create 15% more space, oppose to a conventional single floor apartment. By cutting down corridor space that would have needed to be furnished, equipped, heated, lit, and cleaned it would save 20% in maintenance cost. Since sleeping quarters were adjoined with the other sleeping quarters, it would create minimum sound from the other parts of the apartments. Overall, the project would cut construction cost by at least 15%, and still provide liquidating income, and profit owners.

Along with this pamphlet was a description of the Tullgren Plan Residence Apartment. The plan was seven apartment buildings within the same area. Each apartment was placed so each family would receive maximum sunlight and air. The buildings would’ve also occupied 22% less land, creating more open space around each building. More space meant more things to do with the landscaping. Tullgren's plan for the outside included a sunken garden cour, pool, flower garden, shaded lawn, and promenade. There would have also been a playground area for small children between the buildings, and facilities for larger children. The playground would’ve included the usual playground equipment like swings, sand pits, shallow wading pools, and a camp-fire space. With the open space between buildings, it also allotted space for laundry drying yards. Tullgren saw the possibilities to do the project in a plot of 206,965 square feet, offering maximum housing at a minimum cost. Tullgren's ideal was with careful planning and some government assistance would amount to a great deal of affordable housing at a reasonable profit.

This mindset helped Tullgren become an associated architect on the Parklawn Public Housing Project during the mid-1930s. Parklawn was endorsed by the administration of Daniel Hoan, Mayor of Milwaukee. It included the Allied Architects of Milwaukee, an association of Milwaukee's finest architects, which included Gerrit J de Gelleke, Peter Brust, A.C. Eschweiler, Herbert Tullgren, R.A. Messner, and Phelps Wyman. The project took the vacant spot at Hope Avenue between Sherman Boulevard and North 47th street. This area was selected because it didn't involve a condemnation of any private property. Parklawn included 64 fireproof buildings with 518 units of 3, 4, or 5 room rentals. To this day, Parklawn is still owned and leased by the Housing Authority of the City of Milwaukee.

By 1938, Tullgren published his own magazine, which was overseen by his company and at his own expense, called Architecture and Design. The magazine was a showcase of not only Tullgren's office, but the contractors he worked with. Architecture and Design was aimed to promote their work in hopes of gaining more business.

However, Tullgren's last documented building in Milwaukee was built in 1937, the Badger Mutual Insurance Company building. Shortly thereafter, in 1944, Tullgren died at the age of 54 from heart disease. He left behind a son, Herbert A. Tullgren, two daughters, Mary and Allison, and his wife Eloise A., who would take over the last of his business concerns.

== Architecture Design/Style ==
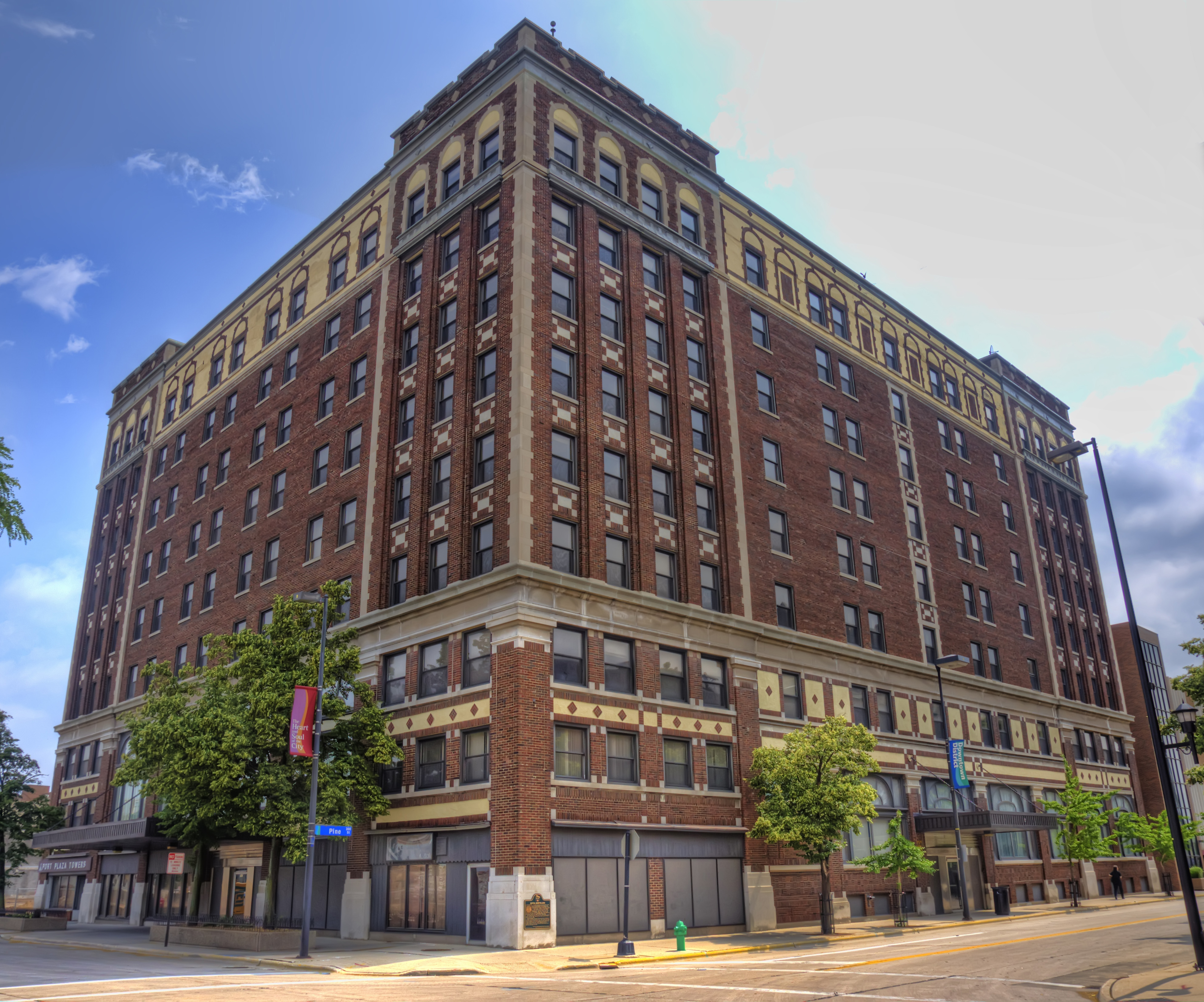
Hotel Northland, Green Bay

The consistent architectural style under Hood & Tullgren was Neoclassical, a design that would be rarely seen in Tullgren's own work later on. When Martin, Herbert's father, started his own business, the style changed to Revival, Tudor Revival and Georgian. By the time, Tullgren was head of the company, the style changed to Tullgren's trademark style, Art Deco and Art Moderne. This occurred around 1928, when Tullgren wanted to embrace modernity that was happening in the urban areas of America after 1925. With this he often incorporated terra cotta ornamentation. Something else that was emphasized in Tullgren's work was the detail through contrast, especially during the 1930s. Tullgren designed apartments with the ideal to help relieve the growing housing crisis during the 1930s. He emphasized affordability for both tenants and owners. Since during the mid-1930s, Americans had felt that free market became incapable of supplying adequate affordable housing for them.

A notable project for Tullgren was the 1260 Exton Apartments. Built in 1937, it is claimed to be the best preserved and sophisticated example of Art Moderne in the country. Another duplex apartment structure, it takes advantage of the interior stacking function, which creates view-orienting spaces. Tullgren built the Exton with grouping of bedrooms on alternate floors with the public corridors, entries, and living space on the floor below. The method behind this was the advantage of the use of skip-stop elevator. This reduces the capital and maintenance costs of the public areas by half. The use of the duplex plan allowed Tullgren to eliminate long public corridors, private halls, and passageways. All rooms have direct access to one central stair hall. Grouped around the central service stacks were the kitchen and baths, which permitted economical structure. The apartment has a reinforced concrete structure, the elevators are flanked by fire towers, and there is sound insulation provided by the double walls between each unit and public spaces.

== Memberships ==
Tullgren in his later life belonged to many different clubs and organizations. He was a member of the Masonic Order, Kenwood Lodge, Ivanhoe Commandery, and Tripoli Temple. He also belonged to the University Club of Milwaukee. Tullgren was part of architectural clubs such as American Institute of Architects and the State Association of Wisconsin Architects. In addition, he was president of The Bluemound Country Club, the Wisconsin Golf Association, and the Gyro Club. He even held other positions such as secretary for the Prospect Park Co.

== Works ==
A number of his works are listed on the U.S. National Register of Historic Places. Works include (with attribution):

Building Name	Address	Architect	Year built	Additions	Demolished?
Glencairn Apartments / Mathews & Wolcock	1328 W Greenfield, Milwaukee, WI	Hood & Tullgren	1900	1902	No
J and L Wechselberg Apartment / Newport Apartments	802-808 N 17th St, Milwaukee, WI	Hood & Tullgren	1902		No
Kenmore Apartments	805-811 N 22nd St, Milwaukee, WI	Hood & Tullgren	1902		
Otsego Hotel	102-106 Francis St., Jackson, MI	Martin Tullgren Co.	1904	1928	
Wallace Apartments	734-754 N 22nd St, Milwaukee, WI	Hood & Tullgren	1905		No
Herman Nunnemacher Apartments	2303 E. Belleview, Milwaukee, WI	Hood & Tullgren	1906		
Herman Nunnemacher Apartments/ San-Rafel Apartments	2205 N. Prospect Ave, Milwaukee, WI	Hood & Tullgren	1906		No
Roseneath Apartments	2335 W Wisconsin Ave, Milwaukee, WI	Hood & Tullgren	1908		No
Stanley Apartment Building/ Read and Neacy Apt./ Belleview Apt.	2511 E. Belleview Place, Milwaukee, WI	Hood & Tullgren	1908		No
Summerfield Court Apartments	1479-1495 N Farwell Ave, Milwaukee, WI	Hood & Tullgren, Herbert Tullgren	1908		No
Katherine Kennedy Apartments/ The Marietta Apartments	3205 N. Marietta Ave, Milwaukee, WI	Martin Tullgren & Sons	1909		No
A. Hood Apartments	2505-13 E. Park Pl., Milwaukee, WI	A. Hood	1910		No
Howard Apartments	2641-49 N. Hackett, Milwaukee, WI	Martin Tullgren & Sons	1910		No
Stellwin Apartments/ The Lakesider	1982 N. Prospect, Milwaukee, WI	Martin Tullgren & Sons	1910		No
Builders Investment Co. / The Weston / Godfrey Apartments	2311 W Wisconsin Ave, Milwaukee, WI	Martin Tullgren & Sons	1911		No
Lafayette Apartments	1913 E. Lafayette Place, Milwaukee, WI	Martin Tullgren & Sons	1911	1941	No
Wallard Apartments	1704-14 E Kane Place, Milwaukee, WI	Martin Tullgren & Sons	1911		No
Julian Strauss Apartments	2633 N Hackett Ave, Milwaukee, WI	Martin Tullgren & Sons	1912		No
Julius Straus Investment - Owned Property	2610 N. Downer Ave, Milwaukee, WI	Martin Tullgren & Sons	1912		
Mulkern Garage Co.	2620-50 N. Downer Ave, Milwaukee, WI	Martin Tullgren & Sons	1912		
Oscar Brachman Residence	748-750 N 34th St, Milwaukee, WI	Martin Tullgren & Sons	1912		
Wayland Apartments	839 N Marshall St, Milwaukee, WI	Martin Tullgren	1913		No
6th Story Marshall and Biddle Tullgren Building	903 E. Kilbourn?, Milwaukee, WI	Martin Tullgren & Sons	1913		
Apartments	2302 E. Wyoming Place, Milwaukee, WI	Martin Tullgren & Sons	1913		
Apartments	2311 E. North Ave, Milwaukee, WI	Martin Tullgren & Sons	1913		
Retail Building	2100 N. Farwell Ave, Milwaukee, WI	Martin Tullgren & Sons	1913		No
Broadmoor Apartments	2544 N Prospect Ave, Milwaukee, WI	Martin Tullgren & Sons	1914		
La Lenore Apartments	3133 W Wisconsin Ave, Milwaukee, WI	Martin Tullgren & Sons	1914		No
Oscar Branchman Apt. Building	2314 E. Wyoming Place, Milwaukee, WI	Martin Tullgren & Sons	1914		No
Royalton Apartments	1614 E. Royall Pl, Milwaukee, WI	Martin Tullgren & Sons	1914		No
Savoy Theater, Oasis Theater	2626 W. Center St, Milwaukee, WI	Martin Tullgren & Sons	1914		No
Downer Theatre	2589 N. Downer Ave, Milwaukee, WI	Martin Tullgren	1915		
Builders Investment Co. / David Batnett Gallery / Patrician Apartments	2101-2117 W Wisconsin Ave, Milwaukee, WI	Martin Tullgren & Sons	1915		No
Junior Terrace/ Oscar Brachman Apts.	2422-24 E. Bradford, Milwaukee, WI	Martin Tullgren & Sons	1915		
Marggraff Apartments	1981 N. Prospect Ave, Milwaukee, WI	Martin Tullgren & Sons	1915		No
St. Catherine's Home for Working Girls	1131 Sycamore St (Michigan St), Milwaukee, WI	Martin Tullgren & Sons	1915		Demolished, site of Marquette Law School
Woodstock Apartments	2105 N Summit, Milwaukee, WI	Martin Tullgren & Sons	1915		No
S. Minard and Pansy Tullgren House / Carolyn Edwards-Heidenreich House	1850 N 74th St, Wauwatosa, WI	Minard Tullgren	1915		
Downer Garage	2551 N. Downer Ave, Milwaukee, WI	Martin Tullgren	1916		
Morry's Vox and Yield	2201-03 N. Prospect, Milwaukee, WI	Martin Tullgren	1916	1919	No
Neacy Read Invst. Co.	2567-79 N Downer Ave, Milwaukee, WI	Martin Tullgren	1916		No
Windsor Court Apartment Building	1006 East State Street, Milwaukee, WI	Martin Tullgren	1916		
Jos. D. Kalt / Kalt Apartments (RAZED)	1621-1625 W Wisconsin Ave, Milwaukee, WI	Martin Tullgren & Sons	1916	1922	Yes (Marquette Engineering Building)
Madra Villa Apartments/ Prospect Kane Apts	1806 E. Kane Place, Milwaukee, WI	Martin Tullgren & Sons	1916		No
Retail Building	3525-33 W. North Ave, Milwaukee, WI	Martin Tullgren & Sons	1916		No
Stratford Apartments (RAZED)	1400-1412 W Wisconsin Ave, Milwaukee, WI	Martin Tullgren & Sons	1916		
A & L Beauty Supply Co/ Central Market Apartment Building	610-622 W. Wisconsin Ave, Milwaukee, WI	Martin Tullgren	1917		No
Bradman Investment Co./ Stowell Arms Apartments	2577 N. Stowell Ave, Milwaukee, WI	Martin Tullgren & Sons	1917		No
Central Market Commercial (RAZED) - Looks like still standing - Dunkin' Donuts is a tenant - JONB	622 W Wisconsin Ave, Milwaukee, WI	Martin Tullgren & Sons	1917		
Milwaukee Gas Specialty Co. Factory	Clybourn Street and 22/3rd St, Milwaukee, WI	Martin Tullgren & Sons	1917		
Monarch Manufacturing Co. / Paul Asch Co. Factory	224 E Chicago St, Milwaukee, WI	Martin Tullgren & Sons	1917		No
Astor on the Lake	924 E Juneau Ave, Milwaukee, WI	Herbert W. Tullgren	1918	1922, 1925	
Henry Clay Elementary School/ Whitefish Bay Middle School	1144 E Henry Clay, Milwaukee, WI	Martin Tullgren & Sons	1918	1924	
Julius Strauss Apartments / Chateau Apartments	2223 E Webster Pl / 2535 N Farwell, Milwaukee, WI	Martin Tullgren & Sons	1918		
Creamery Package Manufacturing Co./ Hartel Building	201 N. Main St, Fort Atkinson. WI	Martin Tullgren & Sons	1919	1931	No
Lincoln Terrace Apt. Building	2220-2230 E. Bradford Ave, Milwaukee, WI	Martin Tullgren & Sons	1919		No
Shinner Co. Warehouse	513-519 N 14th St, Milwaukee, WI	Martin Tullgren & Sons	1919		
United Fireproof Warehouse Company / East Bank Storage Lane	2122-2124 N Prospect Ave, Milwaukee, WI	Martin Tullgren & Sons	1919		No
Wisconsin State Rubber Co. Building (RAZED)	191-193 N 4th St, Sheboygan, WI	Martin Tullgren & Sons	1920		
Untitled	Adjacent to 270 Prospect (old address), Milwaukee, WI	Herbert Tullgren and Sons	1921		
Commodore Apartments	1983-1985 N. Summit Ave, Milwaukee, WI	Martin Tullgren & Sons	1921		
Lakeshore Apartments	1224 N Prospect Ave, Milwaukee, WI	Martin Tullgren & Sons	1921	1922	No
Hotel Retlaw	15 E Division St, Fond du Lac, WI	Herbert W. Tullgren	1922	1923, 1926, 1934, 1976, 1986	No
Orpheum Theater	5819-5831 6th Ave, Kenosha, WI	Herbert W. Tullgren	1922		No
Maywood Hotel	Main Street, Kenosha, WI	Martin Tullgren & Sons	1922		
Ambassador Apartments	1943 N Summit, Milwaukee, WI	Martin Tullgren & Sons	1922		No
Carpenter Building (RAZED)	536 W Wisconsin Ave, Milwaukee, WI	Martin Tullgren & Sons	1922		Yes
Film Exchange	713-713 Wells St (old address)/717 W. Wells St, Milwaukee, WI	Martin Tullgren & Sons	1922		Yes
Oscar Brachman / Junior Court Apartments	2213-2221 W Wisconsin Ave, Milwaukee, WI	Martin Tullgren & Sons	1922		No
Prospect Manor Residence	1925-1927 N Prospect Ave, Milwaukee, WI	Martin Tullgren & Sons	1922		
Sixth Street Parking Garage	182-186 6th/ 732 N. 6th and Wells/Wisconsin, Milwaukee, WI	Martin Tullgren & Sons	1922		Razed 2014 - Demolished in 1966
Whitefish Bay Village Hall	801 E. Lexington Boulevard, Whitefish Bay, WI	Martin Tullgren & Sons	1922		Yes
Royall Apartments & Annex	1525-1533 E Royall Pl / 1749-1751 N Farwell Ave, Milwaukee, WI	Martin Tullgren & Sons (architect), Raulf Company (builder)	1922		No
F. Rosenberg Elevator Company	Franklin, Becker, and C.M.ST.P (3745 N Richards St maybe), Milwaukee, WI	Tullgren	1922		
Saxe Theater/ Saxe's Jeffris Theatre?	319 W. Milwaukee St.?, Janesville, WI	Herbert W. and S. Minard Tullgren	1923		
Dorsen Office Building	2208-2218 N 3rd St, Milwaukee, WI	Martin Tullgren & Sons	1923	1950	
Ardmore Apartment Hotel	1600-1610 W Wisconsin Ave, Milwaukee, WI	Herbert W. and S. Minard Tullgren	1924		
Hotel East-Way	626 N Van Buren, Milwaukee, WI	Herbert W. and S. Minard Tullgren	1924		
Shorewood Manor Apartments	4001 N Prospect, Milwaukee, WI	Herbert W. and S. Minard Tullgren	1924		
Hotel Loraine	119-123 W Washington Ave, Madison, WI	Herbert W. Tullgren	1924	1925	
Herbert W. Tullgren / Terra Company Building	5919-5927 W North Ave, Milwaukee, WI	Herbert W. Tullgren	1924		No
Stores	4401-4411 N Oakland Ave, Shorewood, WI	Herbert W. Tullgren	1924		
Hotel Northland	304 N Adams St, Green Bay, WI	Herbert W. Tullgren (Martin Tullgren & Sons)	1924	1947, re-emergence 2015	No
Shorecrest Hotel	1962 N Prospect Ave, Milwaukee, WI	Herbert W. Tullgren, Martin Tullgren & Sons	1924	1928, 1929	No
Duluth Hotel	219-231 E. Superior Street, Milwaukee, WI	Martin Tullgren & Sons	1924		
Edward Martin Apt.	1544 N. Humboldt, Milwaukee, WI	Martin Tullgren & Sons	1924		No
Manitowoc Hotel/ Evergreen Inn Hotel	204 N. 8th St, Fond du Lac, WI	Herbert W. and S. Minard Tullgren	1925		No
Belmont Hotel	751 N. 4th St, Milwaukee, WI	Martin Tullgren & Sons	1925		Yes
George Watts and Sons Building	751-761 N Jefferson St, Milwaukee, WI	Martin Tullgren & Sons	1925		
Milerand Apartements/ Morris Miller Apartments	3035 W. Wisconsin Ave, Milwaukee, WI	Martin Tullgren & Sons	1925		
Morris Miller Apartment Building	2127 E. Capitol, Shorewood, WI	Martin Tullgren & Sons	1925		No
Plymouth High School	Plymouth, WI	Herbert W. and S. Minard Tullgren	1926		
West Milwaukee Junior High School	West Milwaukee, WI	Herbert W. and S. Minard Tullgren	1926		
Continental Imports	4801 W. North Ave, Milwaukee, WI	Martin Tullgren & Sons	1926		No
Persion Furniture Store and Office Building/ Eggert and Sons Furniture	3814 W North Ave, Milwaukee, WI	Tullgren	1926		Extant
Grafton High School	1111 Broad St, Grafton, WI	Herbert W. and S. Minard Tullgren	1927		
Milwaukee Deaconess Home for Girls (RAZED)	1110 W Kilbourn, Milwaukee, WI	Herbert W. and S. Minard Tullgren	1927		
Dr. David Roberts Commercial Building	726 N. Grand Ave, Waukesha, WI	Herbert W. and S. Minard Tullgren	1927		
Cumberland Grade School	478 N Marlborough Dr, Whitefish Bay, WI	Herbert W. and S. Minard Tullgren	1927	1939	
Richards Street School	5812 N Santa Monica, Whitefish Bay, WI	Herbert W. and S. Minard Tullgren	1927	1947	
West Milwaukee High School	5104 W Greenfield Ave, Milwaukee, WI	Herbert W. Tullgren, P. Lusignan, Tullgren and Sons	1927		No
Bertelson Building	2101-2111 N Prospect Ave, Milwaukee, WI	Martin Tullgren & Sons	1927		No
Commerce Building	744 N 4th St, Milwaukee, WI	Martin Tullgren & Sons	1927	1956	Extant
Randolph Hotel	649 N. 4th St, Milwaukee, WI	Martin Tullgren & Sons	1927		
Drott Tractor Co. Inc. / Nelson E. Born Inc.	3841 W Wisconsin Ave, Milwaukee, WI	Albert G. Peter (Martin Tullgren & Sons)	1928	1937, 1948	No
Wisconsin Creameries	S. 13th (2700 BLK), Milwaukee, WI	Herbert W. and S. Minard Tullgren	1928		
First Wisconsin Garage	746 N Water, Milwaukee, WI	Herbert W. Tullgren	1928		
Nathan Hale High School, later West Allis Central High School	8500-8516 W Lincoln Ave, Milwaukee, WI	Herbert W.Tullgren, P. Lusignan	1928		No
Palmer Products, Inc.	1426 Arcadian Ave, Waukesha, WI	Martin Tullgren & Sons	1928		No
Whitefish Bay National Guard Armory	1225 E Henry Clay St, Whitefish Bay, WI	Martin Tullgren & Sons	1928	1941	Yes
Crane Co. Branch House	225 W Capitol, Milwaukee, WI	Herbert W. Tullgren	1930		No
Hathaway Tower	1830 E Kane Pl, Milwaukee, WI	Herbert W. Tullgren	1930		
White Manor Apartments/ David Hull House	1228-1236 E Juneau, Milwaukee, WI	Herbert W. Tullgren	1930	1944	No
Wisconsin Ice & Coal Co. Building/ Hometown, Inc.	1518 E. North Ave, Milwaukee, WI	Herbert W. Tullgren	1930		No
Armory Courts Building, North Shore Apartments	4001-4015 N Oakland Ave, Shorewood, WI	Herbert W. Tullgren	1930		
Whitefish Bay High School	1200 E Fairmount Ave, Whitefish Bay, WI	Herbert W. Tullgren	1930	1941, 1959, 1968, 2011	No
Fulton Co Factory	1912 S 82nd St, West Allis, WI	Martin Tullgren & Sons	1930		No
Viking Apartments	1705-1717 E Kane Place, Milwaukee, WI	Herbert W. Tullgren, Martin Tullgren & Sons	1931		
Milwaukee-Western Fuel Company Building	2150 N Prospect Ave, Milwaukee, WI	Herbert W. Tullgren	1934		
Sherman Theatre	4632 W Burleigh, Milwaukee, WI	Herbert W. Tullgren	1935		
Parklawn	4435 W Marion, Milwaukee, WI	Herbert W. Tullgren	1936		
Exton Apartments Building	1260 N Prospect, Milwaukee, WI	Herbert W. Tullgren	1937	1938, 1939	
Badger Mutual Insurance Co	1635 W National Ave, Milwaukee, WI	Herbert W. Tullgren, (Addition: Grassold & Johnson)	1937	1947	No
Masonic Temple	Marquette, MI	Herbert W. Tullgren	1938		
Alden Apartments	4303-15 W. Lisbon Ave, Milwaukee, WI	Martin Tullgren & Sons	1925-26		No
Wisconsin Consistory Building (Wisconsin Scottish Rite Cathedral)	790 N Van Buren St, Milwaukee, WI	Herbert W. Tullgren (remodeling), Edward Townsend Mix (original)	1936 REMODEL (1889 original)	1936, 1937	
Apartments	9th and Wells, Milwaukee, WI	Martin Tullgren & Sons	Before 1915		Razed
Henry Bills Store and Office Building	SE Lincoln Ave and 13th Street, Milwaukee, WI	Martin Tullgren & Sons	Before 1925		Razed
Loop Realty Co./Hotel Building	5th and Sycamore (Michigan), Milwaukee, WI	Martin Tullgren & Sons	Before 1925		
Badger Meter Mfg. Co. Factory (RAZED)	2371 N 30th St, Milwaukee, WI	Herbert W. and S. Minard Tullgren		1926	
Untitled	3901 W North Ave, Milwaukee, WI	Herbert W. Tullgren?			
Press block	Lexington Ave & 62nd St, Chicago, IL	Martin Tullgren			
Manhattan Building	133 N. Second St, Milwaukee, WI	Martin Tullgren & Sons		1913	
Maryland Court	2029-41 W. Wisconsin Ave, Milwaukee, WI	Martin Tullgren & Sons			
Frederick Godfrey House	6th Ave and Lake St, Wauwatosa, WI	Martin Tullgren & Sons			
Pershing Grade School	1330 S. 47th, West Milwaukee, WI	Martin Tullgren & Sons		1922	
Store	848 3rd St (Old), new: 2354 N MLK Drive, Milwaukee, WI	Tullgren			
Store and Apartments	3963 N Teutonia St, Milwaukee, WI	Tullgren			
