= William S. King =

American politician

William Smith King
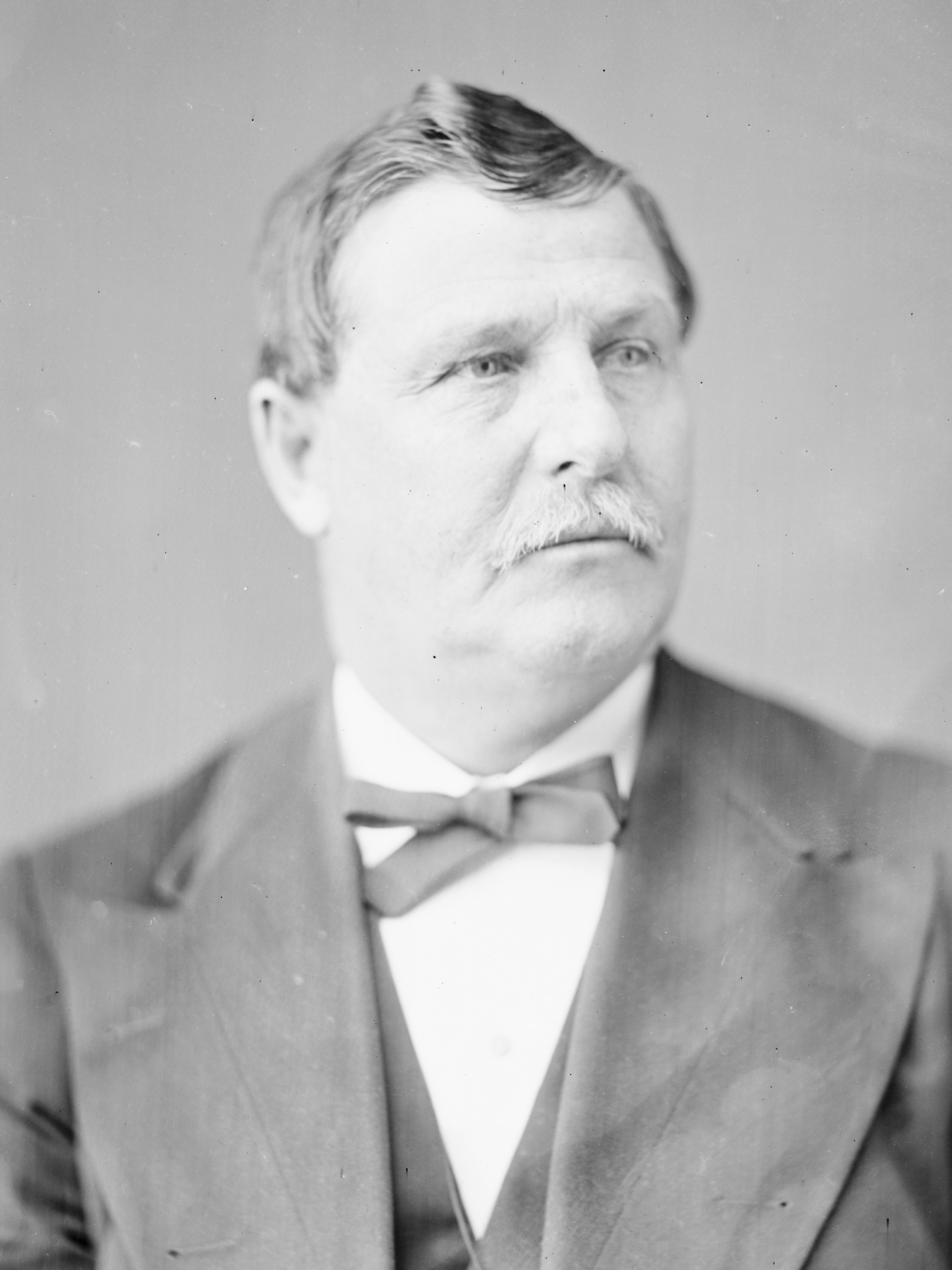
- King c. 1865–1880

Member of the U.S. House of Representatives from Minnesota's 3rd district
- In office March 4, 1875 – March 3, 1877
- Preceded by: John T. Averill
- Succeeded by: Jacob H. Stewart

Personal details
- Born: William Smith King; December 16, 1828 Malone, New York, U.S.
- Died: February 24, 1900 (aged 71) Minneapolis, Minnesota, U.S.
- Resting place: Lakewood Cemetery; Minneapolis, Minnesota, U.S.
- Party: Republican
- Spouse(s): Mary Elizabeth Stevens; Caroline M. Arnold
- Children: 2
- Profession: politician; postmaster; journalist

William Smith King (December 16, 1828 – February 24, 1900) was a Republican U.S. Representative for Minnesota from March 4, 1875, to March 3, 1877. He was a journalist and businessman. He is best known for allegations of political corruption during this congressional term. The House of Representatives did not specify his offense, but decided it was constitutionally unable to punish him for actions that took place before he entered Congress. He did not run for reelection.

== Early life ==
William S. King was born to Reverend Lyndon King in Malone, New York, in Franklin County on December 16, 1828. At the age of 12, his mother died and he left home and became a farm hand.

== Career ==
=== Early career ===
In 1846, he moved to Otsego County, New York, and worked as a solicitor for mutual insurance companies. He began a newspaper career in Cooperstown, New York, in 1852 by becoming an editor of the Free Democrat, a campaign paper in Cooperstown for George Washington Julian and John P. Hale, Free Soil Party candidates for U.S. President. He received the title of Colonel while serving under General Burnside in the New York Guard.

=== Newspaper career ===
King moved to Minneapolis in the summer of 1858, where he continued in journalism and raising cattle. He founded the State Atlas, a weekly newspaper, in 1859. King became known for his strong editorials and columns opposing slavery. Later, he helped create the Minneapolis Tribune, and became a major stockholder in the Pioneer Press in neighboring Saint Paul. There are also indications that he became a principal owner of the Minneapolis Journal.

=== Political career ===
King became active in politics. He became a member of the Wide Awakes. King served as postmaster of the U.S. House of Representatives from July 5, 1861, to 1865 and 1867 to 1873. In 1874, he served as surveyor general of logs and lumber in the Second Congressional District of Minnesota.

Following that, he served one term during the 44th congress as a U.S. Representative from 1875 to 1877. He refused to obey a subpoena issued by a committee to investigate the proceedings of a subsidy for the Pacific Mail Steamship Company. He was asked by members of the legislature to resign, but was ultimately cleared of any wrongdoing.

=== Other pursuits ===
In Minnesota, Colonel King also became involved in railroads and related pursuits. There are indications he was among the first people to lay streetcar rails in Minneapolis, perhaps as early as 1867. Around 1870, he helped execute a contract to build the first section of the Northern Pacific Railway. In 1877, he built a large pavilion at Bde Maka Ska in the city. A tourism boom was occurring at the time. He later sold it to Louis F. Menage, who converted it to a hotel. However, the hotel was eventually destroyed by a fire.

In 1869, King with three others, including George A. Brackett and Dorilus Morrison, purchased a 40 acres (0.16 km^{2}) farm in Minneapolis after the city council refused to purchase it to make a park. During the 1870s, he helped organize the Lakewood Cemetery Association and built a 1,400 acres (5.7 km^{2}) estate. The estate was named Lyndale Farm, named after his father, and reached south from 34th Street to Lake Harriet, allowing ample room to gather choice breeds of cattle for breeding purposes. His herd, including Shorthorn, Ayrshire, and Jersey, evolved into the best in the nation—to some, the world's finest. King's land, originally located in Richfield, was annexed to Minneapolis in 1867 by the state legislature. A portion of the Lyndale Farm was given to Philo Remington and King later filed suit against Remington after Remington sold his deed to the land.

In 1883, King resurrected Minneapolis's Board of Trade and they established the Minneapolis Board of Park Commissioners. He served as a member of the board in Minneapolis from April 25, 1885, to April 1887.

== Personal life ==
King married Mary Elizabeth Stevens of Ilion, New York. King later married Caroline M. Arnold, also of Ilion. He had a son, Preston, and a daughter.

== Death ==
King died on February 24, 1900, at his home in Minneapolis. Upon his death in Minneapolis in 1900, his body was interred at Lakewood Cemetery.

== Glossary ==
- King's Fair: precursor to the Minnesota State Fair that was held in South Minneapolis from 1877 through 1882. Since 1979 the name has also been used for a biennial gathering in the Seward neighborhood. William S. King was a sponsor and organizer of the early fairs.
- King Field: neighborhood in South Minneapolis named after William S. King, whose borders extend from Lyndale Avenue in the west to Interstate 35W in the east and from 36th Street in the north to 46th street in the south.
- King's Highway: section of Dupont Avenue in South Minneapolis honoring William S. King.
- King's Hill: popular sledding hill at Lyndale Farmstead Park.
- Lyndale Avenue: Minneapolis street taking its name from Lyndale Farm, a 1,400-acre estate owned by William S. King.
- Lyndale Farmstead Park: recreational area at 39th Street and Bryant Avenue South that was part of a vast farm belonging to William S. King and named for his father, Rev. Lyndon King.
- Northrup-King Seed Company: prominent Minnesota business, whose founders included William S. King and his son Preston.
- Oakwood Farm in Litchfield: Owned by William S. King and leased by W. H. Gibson.

U.S. House of Representatives
Preceded by John T. Averill	Member of the U.S. House of Representatives from Minnesota's 3rd congressional district 1875–1877	Succeeded by Jacob H. Stewart
