= L. Teweles Seed Co. =

Forage seed company in North America

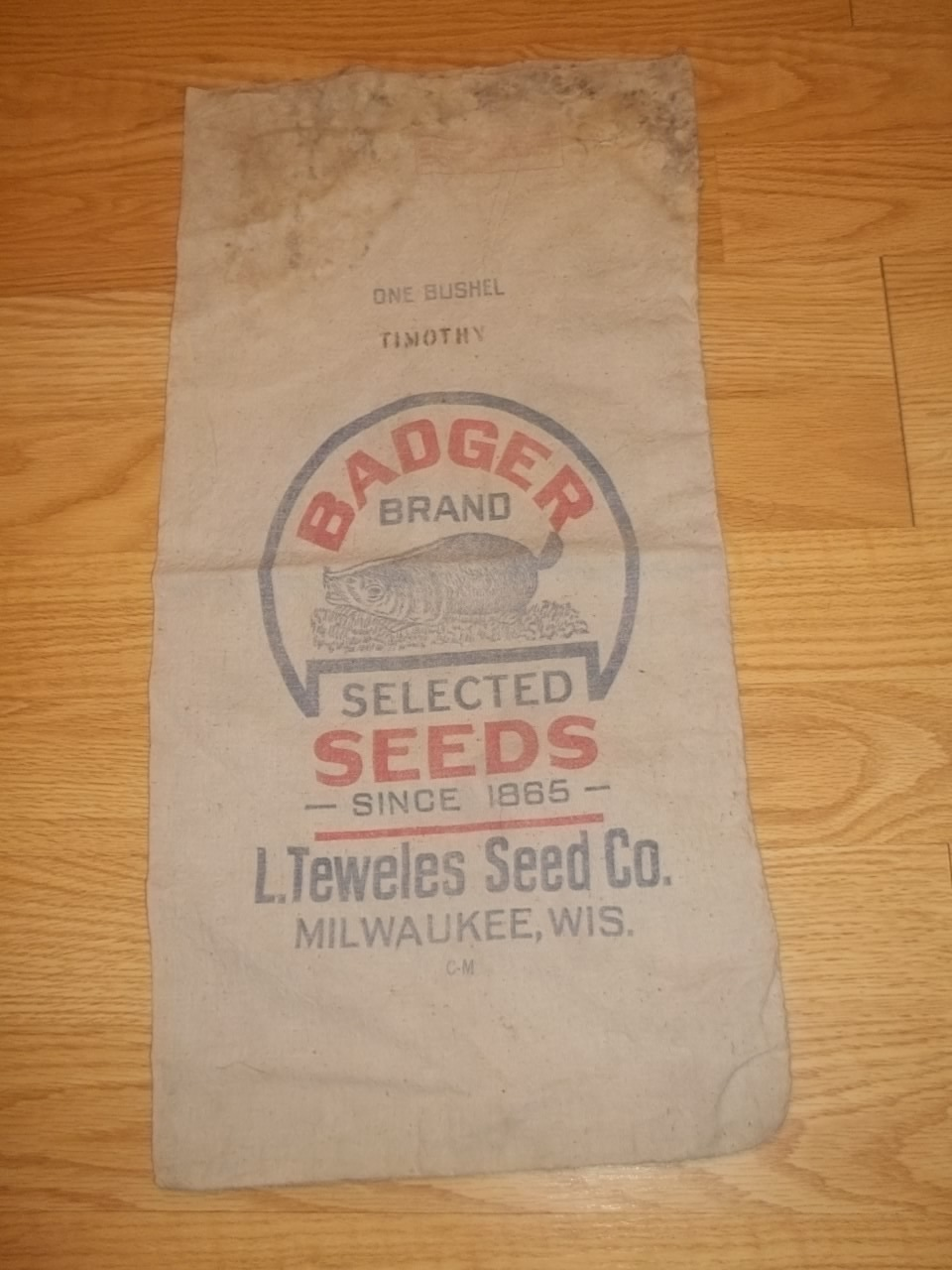
- Company type: Privately held company
- Industry: Agricultural
- Founded: 1865
- Successor: Kent Feeds
- Headquarters: Milwaukee, Wisconsin, U.S.
- Key people: Ludwig Teweles, Teweles family
- Products: Seed, crops, distribution

L. Teweles Seed Co. was created in 1865 and became the second largest forage seed company in North America, only behind Northrup-King. Over the years the company had many of the industry’s firsts including, putting seed in a handy sized bags, bulk seed handling, dying bluegrass seed blue and radio advertisings. The firm was a family-run business over 4 generations until it was later acquired by Kent Feeds, Inc. of Muscatine, Iowa in 1972 for an undisclosed amount.

== History ==
Ludwig Teweles created the L. Teweles Seed Co. in 1865 when he first started selling chicken feathers, seeds and feed. Teweles immigrated from Bohemia and opened a general store in Kellnersville, a produce business in Sheboygan, a seed company in Milwaukee and finally, the L. Teweles Seed Co. The business grew quickly and became a powerhouse in seed production in the midwest. In 1918 the firm built the tallest building on the south side of Milwaukee, a twelve-story reinforced concrete warehouse and production plant. The building is still standing today and has been renovated as an apartment complex. Teweles Seed differentiated itself in the industry in the 1920s when Hugo Teweles came up with the innovation of branding seed. During World War II there was tremendous demand for seed by foreign war-torn countries, including Germany and England. Teweles was allocated by the US government to ship 6 million pounds of seed to Germany alone. Teweles Seed continued to be a leader in seed production with their expanding product line and focus on ground breaking research. Hugo Teweles was a proponent of hybrid seed research. In 1950 the firm was first to engage in private research to create hybrid seed, most notably corn and alfalfa, and claims to be the pioneer of the world's first alfalfa hybrid. From 1950 to 1964 the company began to focus narrowly on research, with an increase in research spending of 400%. In July 1972 the business was acquired by Kent Feeds and became a wholly owned subsidiary that September.

== Brands ==
Teweles Seed was known for branding their seeds. Forage seeds were initially sold with a grade of "prime", "choice" or "fancy" until Hugo Teweles, a zoo buff, proposed in the 1920s to brand the seed grades with the Badger brand as the top quality and Buffalo and Elk brands as the two lesser qualities. The firm differentiated itself by selling seed in smaller bags, 60 pounds for alfalfa, clovers, etc. and 45 pounds for timothy-grass, with orchard and brome grass in 50-pound bags, about half the size of the industry's standard packaging. The slogan for the Badger brand in the 1950s was "More PURE-LIVE seed for your money."

L. Teweles Seed Co. also played a role in the consumer market. The division went by the name of Teweles Lawn Systems Products with the slogan of "Look for the big red T." They offered various blends of lawn grass seed and lawn treatment products. Lawn blends included; Formula 88, Executive and Leisure.

== Family ==
Ludwig Teweles, born in Austria, founded the L. Teweles Seed Co., in 1865. He died from heart failure early July (8th or 9th) of 1917 at the age of 76. He had five sons, and 1 daughter, Oscar, Hugo, Edwin, Max, Arthur, and Hertha.

Oscar Teweles, who at one time held the positions of assistant secretary and treasurer, died at age 66 in the Hotel Astor fire of Milwaukee in the mid thirties. Oscar lived in Hotel Astor for years and was a deaf mute after suffering a stroke. He was retired at the time of his death.

Hugo Teweles, was son of Ludwig Teweles, was president of the firm in early 20th century. He was born in 1872 in Sheboygan, moved to Milwaukee 1884 and died at age 57 on June 11, 1929. He had two sons, Lawrence and Richard Teweles.

Lawrence Teweles first joined the firm in 1919, was president from 1952 until 1960, became chairman of the board in 1960, and died of a heart attack Jan 6 1967.

Richard H. Teweles Was treasurer and Assistant Chairman. Until his death in 1969.

L. William Teweles and Robert L. were the sons of Lawrence Teweles.

Hugh R. Teweles, was Vice President and a Secretary of the company for many years, the son of Richard H. Teweles.

L. William Teweles worked in the family business from 1946 until July 1972. He was president for 12 of those years.

Robert L. Teweles was executive vice president of the company in 1972.

== Seed Tower renovation ==
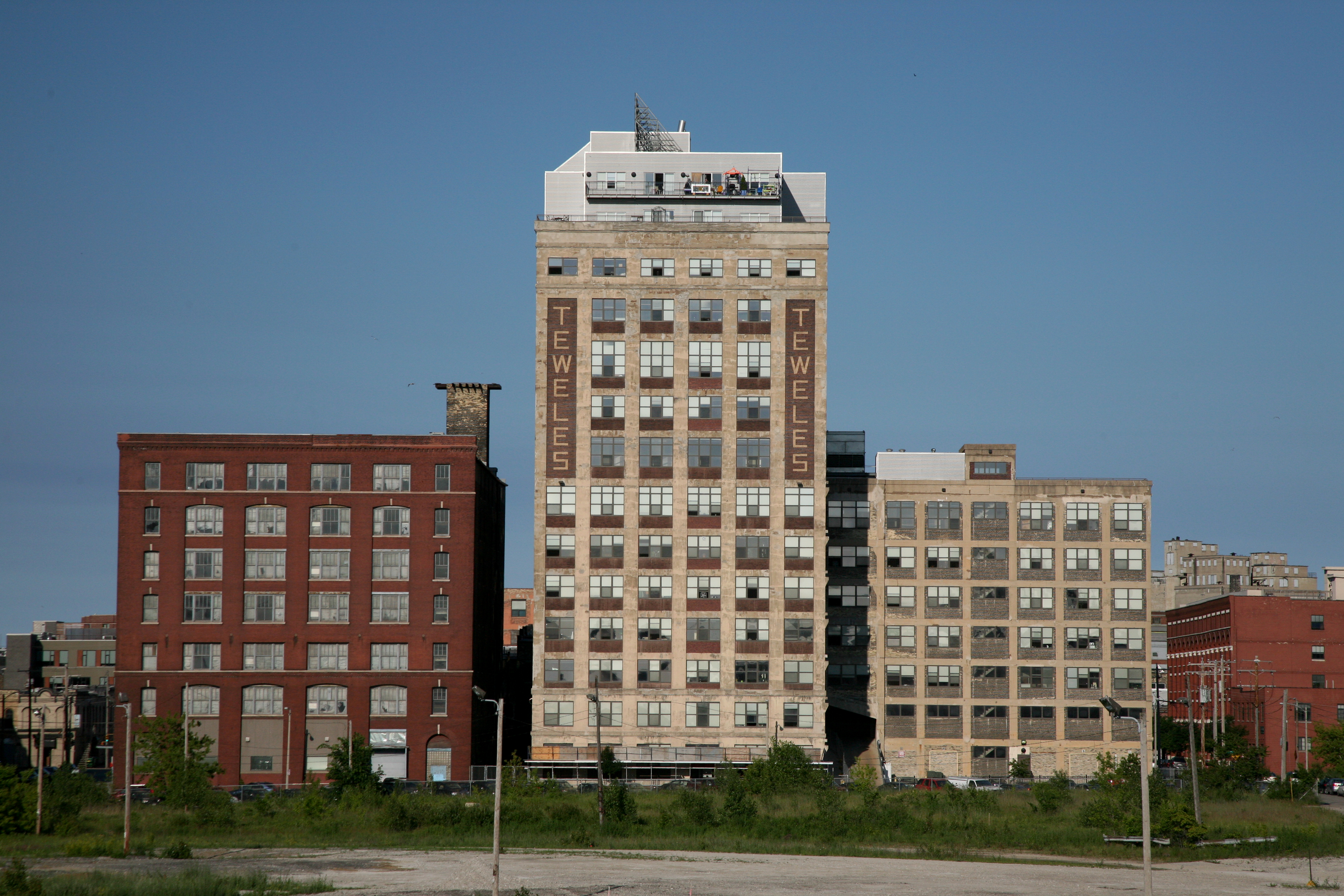
Milwaukee, Teweles Seed Tower Renovated

L. Teweles Seed Co headquarters and warehouse, often referred to as the Seed Tower, went under renovation in the early 2000s and was turned into a loft apartment complex. US Bank and Simpson Housing Solutions provided financing for the 18.5 million dollar project. Architectural design was handled by 3rd Cost Design Concepts. The Seed Tower is part of Milwaukee's Historic Fifth Ward. The building is a visible part of the area, with its distinctive design and Teweles name enscripted on 4 stories of the exterior of the building.
