= Whitefish Bay National Guard Armory =

- Formerly listed on the U.S. National Register of Historic Places
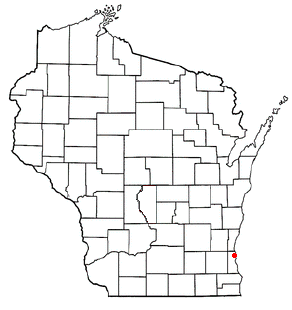
- Location: 1225 E. Henry Clay St. Whitefish Bay, Wisconsin
- Architect: Herbert Tullgren
- NRHP reference No.: 02000650

Significant dates
- Added to NRHP: June 6, 2002
- Removed from NRHP: April 6, 2011

Whitefish Bay National Guard Armory was located at 1225 East Henry Clay Street, on six acres of land at the southwest corner of Henry Clay Street and Ardmore Avenue, in Whitefish Bay, Wisconsin. The red brick building with crenelated top and central tower was called "the finest armory in the state". Inside were well-lit classrooms off wide terrazzo corridors, double staircase with ornate ogee window, gymnasium, kitchen, and lounge with beamed ceiling and mammoth fireplace. Built in 1928, it was designed by prolific local architect Herbert W. Tullgren.

The land was part of a 19-acre plot purchased in 1870 by Friedrick Gustave Rabe, a German immigrant, who built a white frame farmhouse for his wife and two daughters. His land was bordered by Henry Clay Street on the north, Ardmore Avenue on the east, Fairmount Avenue on the south, and Marlborough Drive and Kimbark Place on the west. After Rabe's death, the property was purchased by Otto Falk, vice president of Falk Corporation, and a prominent Wisconsin National Guard officer.

Starting around 1909, the property was used as a summer camp by a National Guard artillery unit. The farmhouse was occupied by three different commanding officers and their families. Numerous Wisconsin National Guard units trained on this property for duty in the Mexican border war, World War I, World War II, and the Korean Conflict. It became home to the United States Army's 32nd Infantry Division. Called “Red Arrow Division” to signify its tenacity in piercing the enemy line, their shoulder patch design forms a striking centerpiece to the site's current memorial garden.

In 1927, 13 acres were sold to the village as a site for Whitefish Bay High School, which opened in 1932. Architect Tullgren was chosen to design the high school, as well as village hall, and elementary schools Cumberland, Richards, and Henry Clay (now Whitefish Bay Middle School).

In 1941, red brick garages were added to the west side of the armory. A two-story addition to the farmhouse provided offices, classroom, and a pine-paneled officers' club room, affectionately dubbed “the white house". Many important village events, such as weddings and proms, were held in the armory. For years, local 16-year old residents took their driver's license exams in its classroom. In 1989, it was named a Milwaukee County Landmark.

In 1995, the village of Whitefish Bay bought the property. Public hearings were held to determine how the building should be used. Numerous suggestions were considered but, in 1998, a decision was made to raze the building, garages, and farmhouse for use as a park. Efforts were made to save the farmhouse, one of the oldest buildings in the village, but it was razed in 2000. The armory building and garages were demolished in 2004.

Now known as Armory Park, the site is home to Whitefish Bay Veterans Monument and Memorial Garden.
