= Postmaster of the United States House of Representatives =

Employee of the United States Congress from 1834 to 1992

The postmaster of the United States House of Representatives was an employee of the United States Congress from 1834 to 1992.

Before the creation of the office of postmaster, mail duties were handled by workers in the office of the doorkeeper, who were paid additional compensation. The postmaster was made into a distinct and permanent House of Representatives employee in 1832, and in 1834, William J. McCormick, a doorkeeper's office employee, was named as the first House postmaster. Four years later, the postmaster was also given responsibility for the Capitol post office. The office of postmaster was abolished in 1992; House mail handling procedures were reassigned to other officers and private entities.

A total of twenty-one postmasters served in the House. One postmaster, William S. King, served as a U.S. representative after his service as postmaster.

== List of postmasters ==
Congress (years)	Postmasters, state or territory	Date elected
23rd (1834–35)	William J. McCormick, DC	-
24th (1835–37)	William J. McCormick, DC	-
25th (1837–39)	William J. McCormick, DC	-
26th (1839–41)	William J. McCormick, DC	December 23, 1839
27th (1841–43)	William J. McCormick, DC	June 9, 1841
28th (1843–45)	John M. Johnson, VA	January 4, 1844
29th (1845–47)	John M. Johnson, VA	December 3, 1845
30th (1847–49)	John M. Johnson, VA	December 8, 1847
31st (1849–51)	John M. Johnson, VA	-
32nd (1851–53)	John M. Johnson, VA	December 1, 1851
33rd (1853–55)	John M. Johnson, VA	December 5, 1853
34th (1855–57)	Robert Morris, PA	February 5, 1856
35th (1857–59)	Michael W. Cluskey, GA	December 7, 1857
36th (1859–61)	Josiah M. Lucas, IL	February 6, 1860
37th (1861–63)	William S. King, MN*	July 5, 1861
38th (1863–65)	William S. King, MN	December 8, 1863
39th (1865–67)	Josiah Given, OH	December 4, 1865
40th (1867–69)	William S. King, MN	March 5, 1867
41st (1869–71)	William S. King, MN	March 5, 1869
42nd (1871–73)	William S. King, MN	March 4, 1871
43rd (1873–75)	Henry Sherwood, MI	December 1, 1873
44th (1875–77)	James M. Steuart, VA	December 6, 1875
45th (1877–79)	James M. Steuart, VA	October 15, 1877
46th (1879–81)	James M. Steuart, VA	March 18, 1879
47th (1881–83)	Henry Sherwood, MI	December 5, 1881
48th (1883–85)	Lycurgus Dalton, IN	December 4, 1883
49th (1885–87)	Lycurgus Dalton, IN	December 7, 1885
50th (1887–89)	Lycurgus Dalton, IN	December 5, 1887
51st (1889–91)	James L. Wheat, WI; James W. Hathaway, MT	December 2, 1889; December 15, 1890
52nd (1891–93)	James W. Hathaway, MT	December 8, 1891
53rd (1893–95)	Lycurgus Dalton, IN	August 7, 1893
54th (1895–97)	Joseph C. McElroy, OH	December 2, 1895
55th (1897–99)	Joseph C. McElroy, OH	March 15, 1897
56th (1899-1901)	Joseph C. McElroy, OH	December 4, 1899
57th (1901–03)	Joseph C. McElroy, OH	December 2, 1901
58th (1903–05)	Joseph C. McElroy, OH	November 9, 1903
59th (1905–07)	Joseph C. McElroy, OH	December 4, 1905
60th (1907–09)	Samuel A. Langum, MN	December 2, 1907
61st (1909–11)	Samuel A. Langum, MN	March 15, 1909
62nd (1911–13)	William M. Dunbar, GA	April 4, 1911
63rd (1913–15)	William M. Dunbar, GA	April 7, 1913
64th (1915–17)	William M. Dunbar, GA	December 6, 1915
65th (1917–19)	William M. Dunbar, GA	April 2, 1917
66th (1919–21)	Frank W. Collier, WI	May 19, 1919
67th (1921–23)	Frank W. Collier, WI	April 11, 1921
68th (1923–25)	Frank W. Collier, WI	December 3, 1923
69th (1925–27)	Frank W. Collier, WI	December 7, 1925
70th (1927–29)	Frank W. Collier, WI	December 5, 1927
71st (1929–31)	Frank W. Collier, WI	April 15, 1929
72nd (1931–33)	Finis E. Scott, TN	December 7, 1931
73rd (1933–35)	Finis E. Scott, TN	March 9, 1933
74th (1935–37)	Finis E. Scott, TN	January 3, 1935
75th (1937–39)	Finis E. Scott, TN	January 5, 1937
76th (1939–41)	Finis E. Scott, TN	January 3, 1939
77th (1941–43)	Finis E. Scott, TN	January 3, 1941
78th (1943–45)	Finis E. Scott, TN	January 6, 1943
79th (1945–47)	Finis E. Scott, TN	January 3, 1945
80th (1947–49)	Frank W. Collier, WI	January 3, 1947
81st (1949–51)	Finis E. Scott, TN	January 3, 1949
82nd (1951–53)	Finis E. Scott, TN	January 3, 1951
83rd (1953–55)	Beecher Hess, OH	January 3, 1953
84th (1955–57)	H.H. Morris, KY	January 5, 1955
85th (1957–59)	H.H. Morris, KY	January 3, 1957
86th (1959–61)	H.H. Morris, KY	January 7, 1959
87th (1961–63)	H.H. Morris, KY	January 3, 1961
88th (1963–65)	H.H. Morris, KY	January 9, 1963
89th (1965–67)	H.H. Morris, KY	January 4, 1965
90th (1967–69)	H.H. Morris, KY	January 10, 1967
91st (1969–71)	H.H. Morris, KY	January 3, 1969
92nd (1971–73)	H.H. Morris, KY; Robert V. Rota, PA	January 21, 1971; July 1, 1972
93rd (1973–75)	Robert V. Rota, PA	January 3, 1973
94th (1975–77)	Robert V. Rota, PA	January 14, 1975
95th (1977–79)	Robert V. Rota, PA	January 4, 1977
96th (1979–81)	Robert V. Rota, PA	January 15, 1979
97th (1981–83)	Robert V. Rota, PA	January 5, 1981
98th (1983–85)	Robert V. Rota, PA	January 3, 1983
99th (1985–87)	Robert V. Rota, PA	January 3, 1985
100th (1987–89)	Robert V. Rota, PA	January 6, 1987
101st (1989–91)	Robert V. Rota, PA	January 3, 1989
102nd (1991–93)	Robert V. Rota, PA; Michael J. Shinay, VA	January 3, 1991; March 31, 1992

== Sources ==
- Postmasters of the House, Office of the Clerk
  - House Journal, various editions;
  - Congressional Globe, various editions;
  - Congressional Record, various editions;
  - Biographical Directory of the United States Congress (2005);
  - Congressional Pictorial Directory, various editions.
  - Official Congressional Directory, various editions.
