= Wisconsin Consistory Building =

Building in Milwaukee, Wisconsin

- U.S. National Register of Historic Places
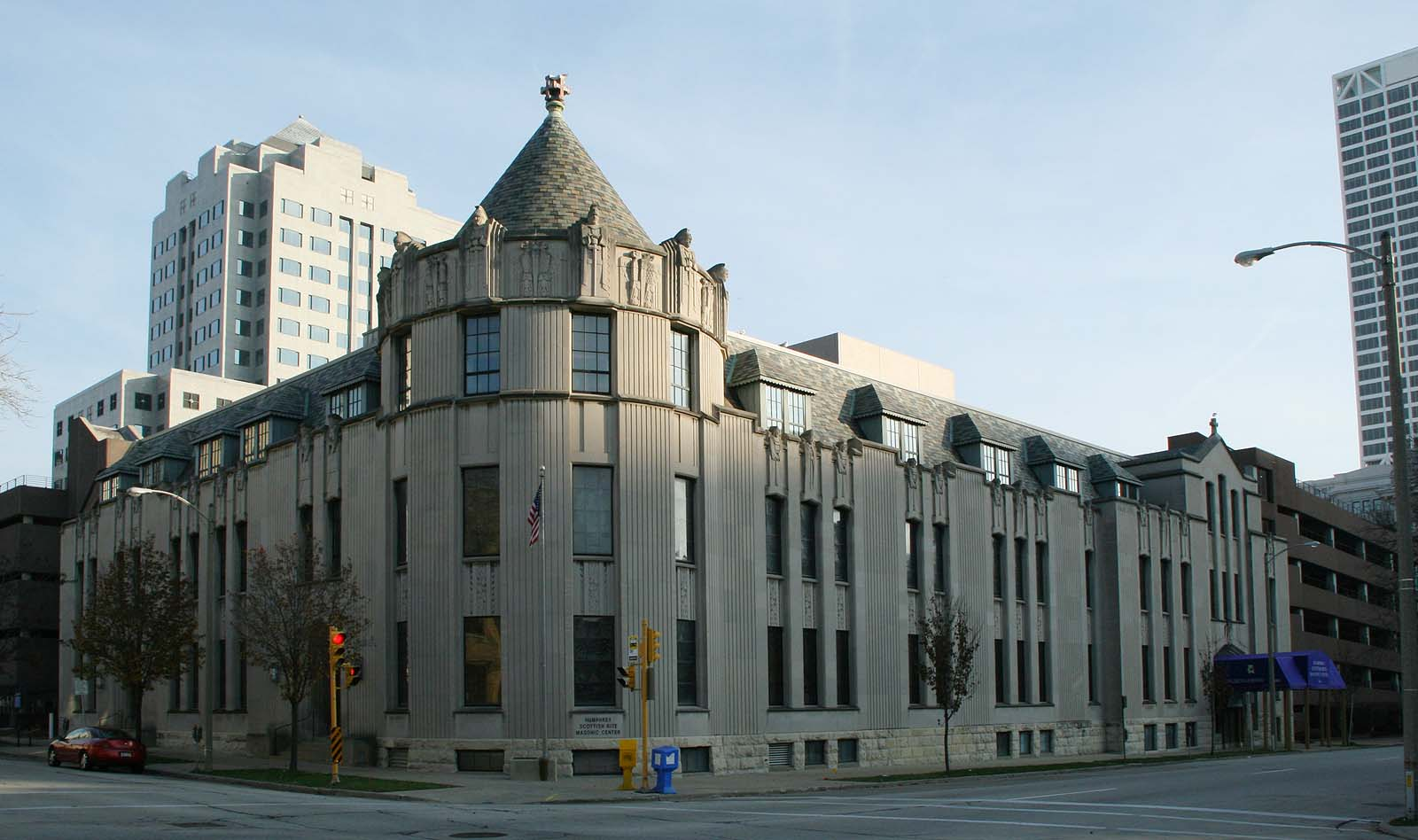

- Location within Wisconsin Location within the United States
- Location: 790 N. Van Buren St., Milwaukee, Wisconsin
- Coordinates: 43°2′29″N 87°54′8″W
- Area: less than one acre
- Built: 1893
- Architect: Edward T. Mix and Herbert W. Tullgren
- Architectural style: Art Deco
- NRHP reference No.: 94001158
- Added to NRHP: September 26, 1994

The Wisconsin Consistory Building, also known as the Humpfrey Scottish Rite Masonic Center, is a historic structure in Milwaukee, Wisconsin that was built as a Romanesque-style Congregational church in 1889, then bought by a Masonic order and remodeled to an Art Moderne style in 1937. In 1994 it was listed on the National Register of Historic Places.

The frame of the Consistory building was built by Plymouth Congregational Church. Plymouth had roots in First Congregational Church, organized in 1841. In 1847 part of that congregation split off into a separate congregation which became Plymouth Congregational. By 1861 the congregation was large and wealthy, including businessmen and professionals like architect E. Townsend Mix. Under Pastor Judson Titsworth, Plymouth aimed to be a "people's church," ministering to the community with social programs like the Third Ward Mission, a boy's club, adult education, a reading room, and the Milwaukee Rescue Mission.

In 1888 Plymouth undertook the building of a new church, the frame of the current building at Van Buren and Wells. Member Mix designed a Richardsonian Romanesque-styled building. To serve the community, the building included a 1200-seat auditorium, reading rooms, a parlor, classrooms, a gym and dining facilities. Typical of the style, the foundation is rough limestone, many openings are round-arched, and chimneys were tall and ornate. (A photo of the old building is at the MPL link below.) The large corner tower was not typical of the style, and the design was criticized.

By 1912, many in the congregation were moving and the congregation moved to a new building near modern UW-Milwaukee. They sold the building to the Scottish Rite Masons. These masons initially called the building the Consistory Building, for the Consistory - a body within the Scottish Rite organization. Later, that body's pre-eminence declined, the building was shared equally by other Scottish Rite bodies, and the building was called the Scottish Rite Masonic Center.

The building worked well for the masons, but by the 1930s they needed more space. When other plans fell through, they hired Herbert Tullgren, a Mason himself, to design an overhaul of the exterior. Tullgren re-clad the old building with a new roof and Art Deco styling. The facade was extensively remodeled including the removal of chimneys flanking the corner dome. It covers an entire city block and contains approximately 22,000 square feet (2,000 m^{2}). It has a chapel, an auditorium, a reception hall and a pub. In addition to Masonic purposes, it is used as a rental wedding and banquet hall.

As membership and general needs changed over the past decade, the building was eventually put up for sale and sold to a development company in October 2017 closing a 106-year history of Scottish Rite occupancy and ownership of the historic site.
