= Northrup-King =

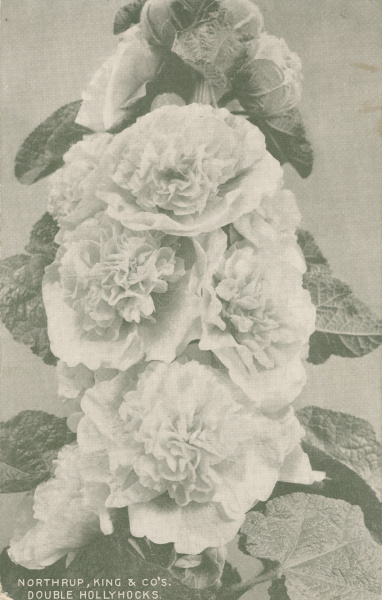
- Predecessor: Northrup, Braslan and Company; Northrup, Braslan and Goodwin Company
- Founded: 1884; 142 years ago in Minneapolis, Minnesota, United States
- Founder: Charles E. Braslan; Jesse E. Northrup
- Parent: Syngenta

Northrup-King Seed Company was founded in Minneapolis, Minnesota in 1896, and was based there until it was acquired and moved to Golden Valley, Minnesota in 1986. It is now a division of Syngenta.

== Company history ==
Northrup, King and Co. was founded in 1884 as Northrup, Braslan and Company. Its founders, Jesse E. Northrup and Charles E. Braslan, moved to Minneapolis from the Eastern United States. They chose Minneapolis because they believed seeds grown in the North were resilient and productive, and because they viewed Minneapolis as an ideal distribution center. They published their first illustrated seed catalog in 1885. It used striking full-color lithographs that made a strong impression.

During the 1880s, Northrup and Braslan expanded their business but soon experienced trouble. In 1887, Northrup and Braslan invited A.H. Goodwin to partner with them. The men renamed the business Northrup, Braslan and Goodwin Company and expanded its reach; but, after the economic Panic of 1893 and a fire in the company building, the business could not pay back its debts.

In 1894, they sought relief from Colonel William S. King and his son Preston. The Kings' assistance was not enough, however, and in May 1896, Northrup, Braslan and Goodwin Co. went bankrupt. Six months later, in November 1896, the men incorporated a new business: Northrup, King and Co.

Northrup, King and Co. struggled for several years but had success by 1900. Its mail-order business peaked in 1909, and the company began to send salesmen to retailers across the state. The company continued selling seeds for garden use but also began to sell field seed for farming.

The cold Minnesota weather was a major selling point for Northrup, King and Co. The company created its Polar Brand to emphasize the virtues of Northern-grown seed. Northrup, King and Co. later developed other cold-weather brands called Sterling, Northland, and Viking. These brands differed in price and quality, and were targeted to different audiences. This made Northrup, King and Co. one of the first seed companies to use branding as a marketing technique.

Corn hybrids became a major part of the company's business in the 1930s. In 1938, Northrup, King and Co. partnered with the University of Minnesota to test the company's hybrid corn varieties at Femco Farms in the Red River Valley. Their hybrids were bred to have the best traits of different genetic strains. They were also very profitable, because the hybrid breeding process meant that the hybrids were intellectually protected even without patents.

In the 1960s, Northrup, King and Co. vice president Allenby White fought for patent protection for agricultural crops that were more difficult to hybridize. This expanded protection was initially rejected by the United States Congress but passed in 1970. It helped companies including Northrup, King and Co. but hurt horticulturists and small farmers.

In 1968, Northrup, King and Co. offered its first public stock shares. The company grew rapidly after it went public, but in 1975 it saw significant losses. The next year, the company was purchased by a Swiss pharmaceutical company called Sandoz, Ltd. Sandoz bought the company for more than twice its book value, renamed it Northrup King, and invested heavily in research.

Sandoz, Ltd. went through several corporate mergers and reorganizations in the 1990s. In 1997, Northrup King became a subsidiary of Syngenta, where it became known as the NK brand.

== Minneapolis headquarters ==
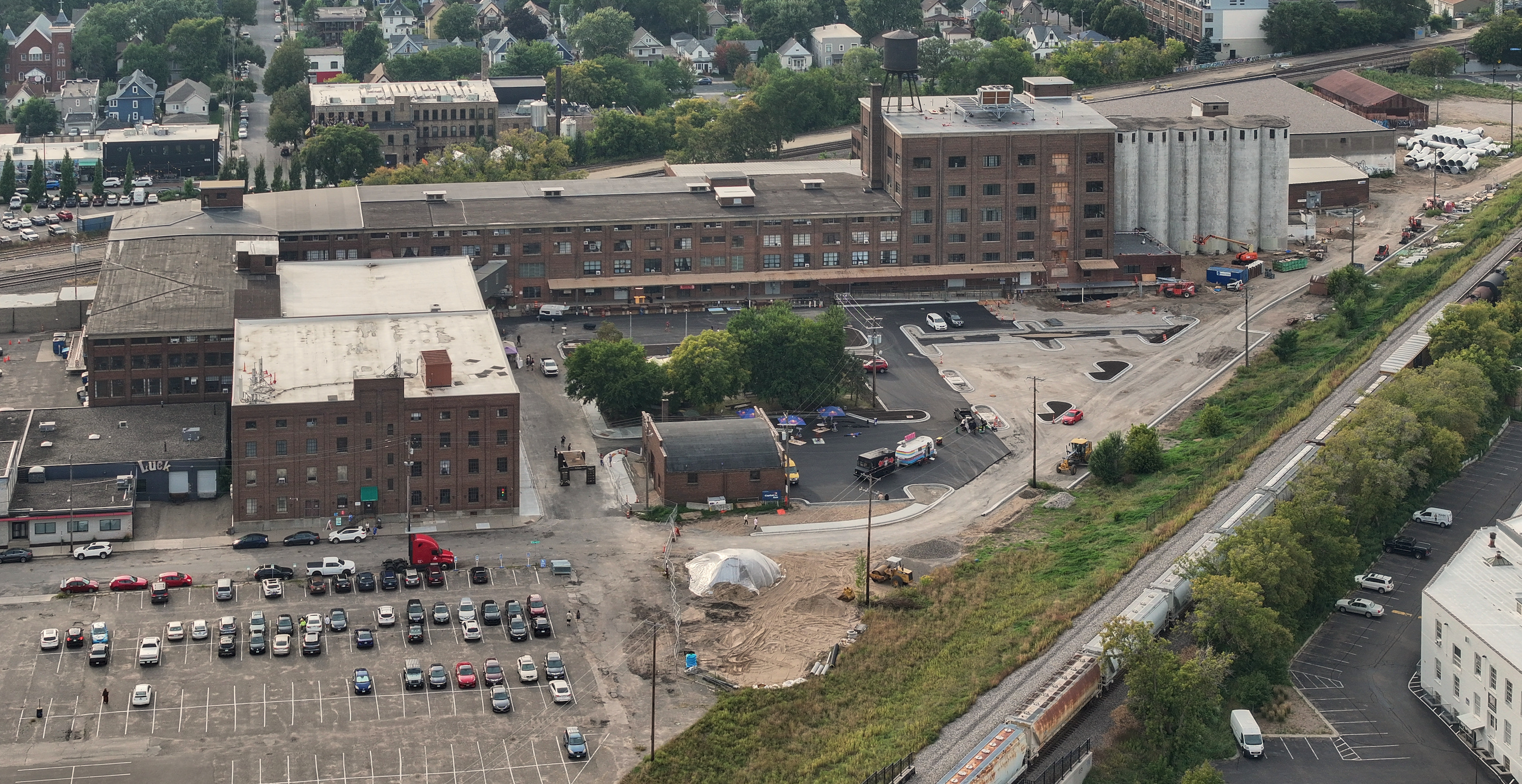
Northrup-King's former Jackson Street facility, now home to art studios and art galleries.

In 1917, Northrup, King and Co. built a new headquarters in Minneapolis at 1500 Jackson Street Northeast. The company kept a retail store on Hennepin Avenue, but its new location was ideal for distributing seed. It was located where the Great Northern and Northern Pacific railroads came together.

In 1986, Northrup King moved out of its Jackson Street building. In 1996, Debbie Woodward began managing the old Northrup King building. Under her management, it became home to art studios, art galleries, and nonprofit organizations.

== See also ==
- L. Teweles Seed Company
