= Hilton Milwaukee =

Hilton-branded hotel in Milwaukee, Wisconsin

Coordinates: 43°02′18.6″N 87°55′05.3″W

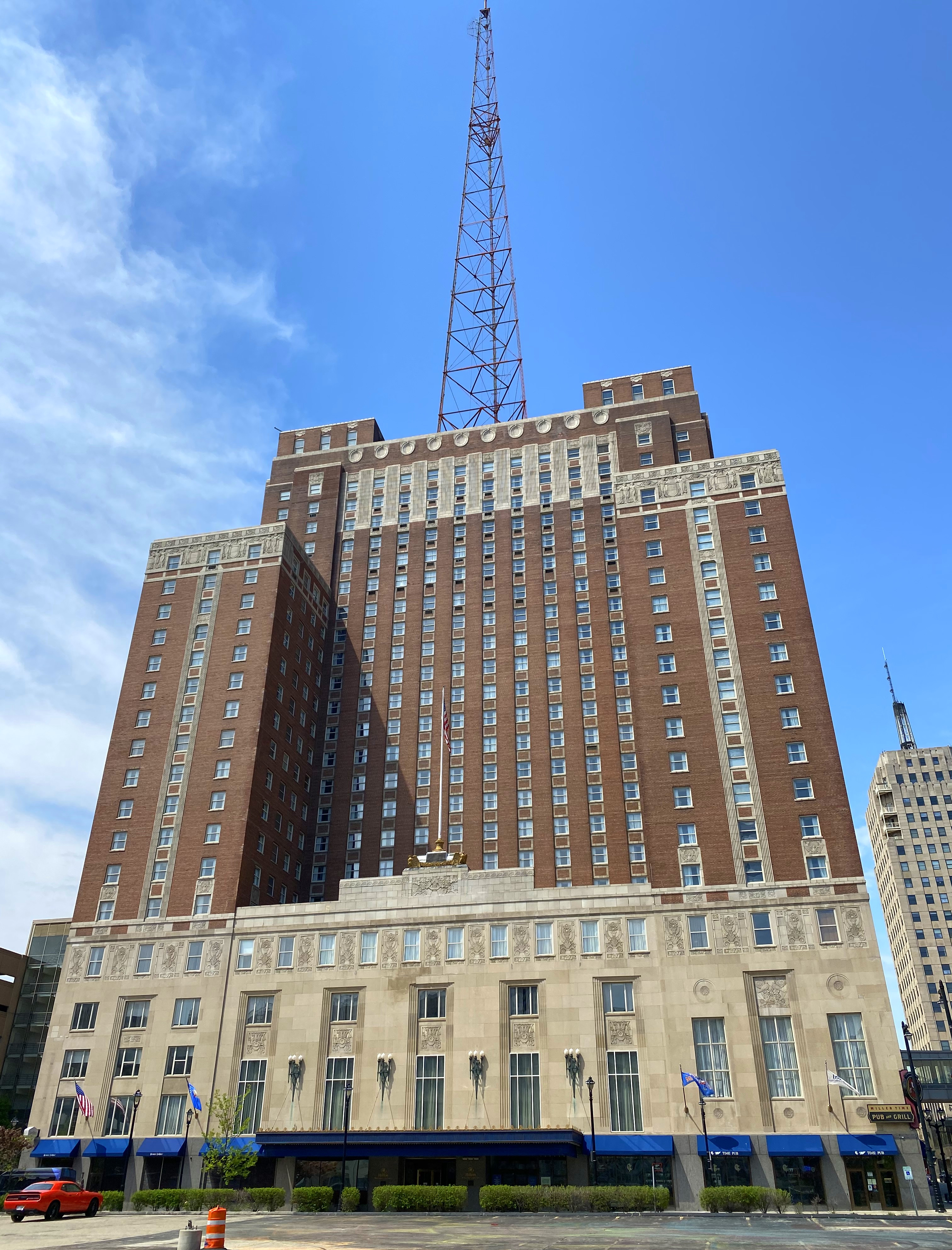
- Hilton Milwaukee in May 2021
- Hotel chain: Hilton Hotels

General information
- Architectural style: Neoclassical architecture, Art deco
- Location: 509 West Wisconsin Ave; Milwaukee, Wisconsin
- Opening: 1928
- Owner: Marcus Corporation

Design and construction
- Architect: Holabird & Roche

Other information
- Number of rooms: 554
- Number of restaurants: 3
- Parking: Parking garage
- Public transit: MCTS

Website
- www.hilton.com/en/hotels/mkemhhf-hilton-milwaukee/

The Hilton Milwaukee is a historic Art Deco-style hotel opened in 1928 and located in the Westown neighborhood of downtown Milwaukee, Wisconsin. It is owned by the Marcus Corporation, which also owns the Pfister Hotel and the Saint Kate Hotel in Downtown Milwaukee. Hilton Milwaukee is a member of Historic Hotels of America, an official program of the National Trust for Historic Preservation.

== History ==
The Schroeder Hotel opened in 1928. It was developed and owned by hotel magnate Walter Schroeder and designed by Holabird & Roche. Its exterior is in the simplified neo-classical style, while its interiors are Art Deco, with extensive use of hardwoods and intricate decorative metal detailing. The 25-story building has a height of 274 feet (84 meters), with an antenna added in 1953 extending its total height to 677 feet (206 meters).

Schroeder sold the hotel in 1964 to Towne Realty. In April 1965, Sheraton Hotels assumed management of the hotel, renaming it the Sheraton-Schroeder Hotel. Sheraton renovated the hotel at a cost of $2 million and purchased the hotel outright from Towne Realty in January 1967. Sheraton sold the hotel in 1972 to local businessman Ben Marcus, who renovated it and reopened it in 1973 as the Marc Plaza Hotel. In 1995, the Marcus Corporation brought in Hilton Hotels to manage the property, and it was renamed the Hilton Milwaukee City Center. A 13-floor addition, designed by Kahler Slater Architects and built by Mortenson, was constructed in 2000, along with an adjoining indoor waterpark called Paradise Landing, which closed in 2013.

The Hilton was scheduled to serve as the headquarters hotel for the 2020 Democratic National Convention, before the COVID-19 pandemic forced a temporary closure, along with major changes to the DNC to a remote format.

In March 2020, the hotel closed due to COVID-19 pandemic. In June 2020, Marc Corporation permanently laid off 79 workers at the Hilton Milwaukee City Center In December 2024, the hotel was renamed Hilton Milwaukee, as part of a $40 million renovation.

In December 2024, a $42 million renovation of the historic 554-room main tower began. It was completed in January 2026. The 175-room west wing, added in 2000, was not renovated. In January 2026, it became The Marc Hotel, a separate, adjoining limited-service hotel, with its own newly constructed entrance on North 6th Street.

Renovation plans also called for the removal of the 400-foot antenna on the roof, but that has been postponed, because removal requires complicated scheduling for the helicopters needed to lift the steel structure off the hotel. As a result, no date has been announced.

== See also ==
- Marcus Corporation
- List of Historic Hotels of America

Records
Preceded by Pabst Building	2nd Tallest building in Milwaukee; 1927—1930; 84m	Succeeded by Wisconsin Tower
