= Astor on the Lake =

- U.S. National Register of Historic Places
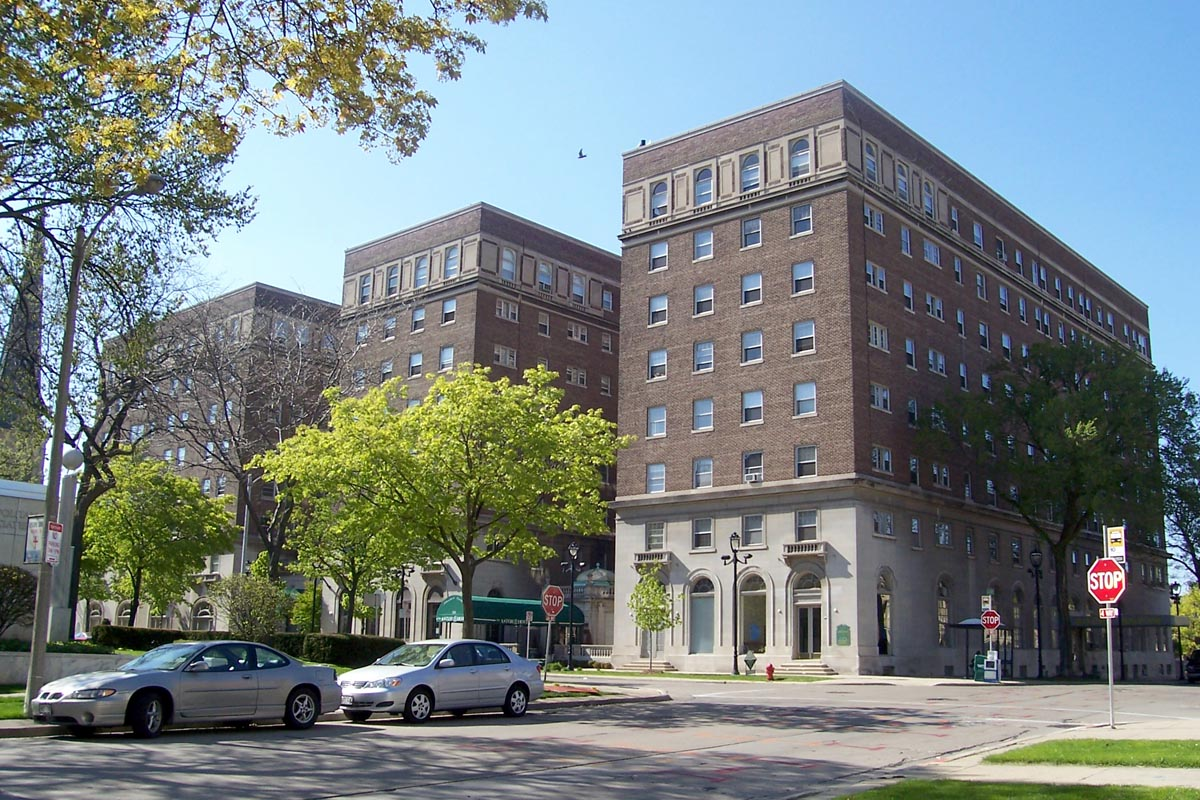
- Astor on the Lake
- Location: 924 E. Juneau Ave; Milwaukee, Wisconsin
- Coordinates: 43°2′45″N 87°54′1″W
- Built: 1920
- Architect: Herbert W. Tullgren
- Architectural style: Classical Revival
- NRHP reference No.: 84003715
- Added to NRHP: September 6, 1984

The Hotel Astor is a low-rise residential hotel building located in the Yankee Hill (East Town) neighborhood of downtown Milwaukee, Wisconsin. It is listed on the National Register of Historic Places as the Astor on the Lake. It currently serves as an apartment building.

Designed by architect Herbert Tullgren in Classical Revival style, the Hotel Astor was built in 1920 by developer Oscar Brachman for hotel tycoon Walter Schroeder. The building was originally U-shaped in plan, but an L-shaped addition in 1925 made the building into the E-shape seen today. The building has eight floors and stands 102 feet (31 m) tall.

== History ==
When the Astor opened, it was considered one of the finest Midwest hotels of the time. It offered 125 guest rooms with a monthly rent of $100 to $300 depending on size. The façade is covered with gray limestone and has French Classical details and was constructed using steel-reinforced concrete. A stained glass skylight hangs above the reception area. Many of the rooms, which are now owner-occupied, were of simpler design.

== Fire ==
At dawn on February 18, 1935, the Astor caught fire. The fire was caused by electrical wires in the basement and a dense, oily smoke filled the building. The fire claimed the lives of two adults and two infants. Oscar Teweles, 59, and his nurse, Elsie Saxinger, 40, were killed due to suffocation in his apartment on the fifth floor. Over 300 people had to be evacuated due to the fire and were sent into the city streets. The damage caused by the fire was estimated at $75,000.
