= Hotel Northland =

Hotel in Green Bay, Wisconsin, US

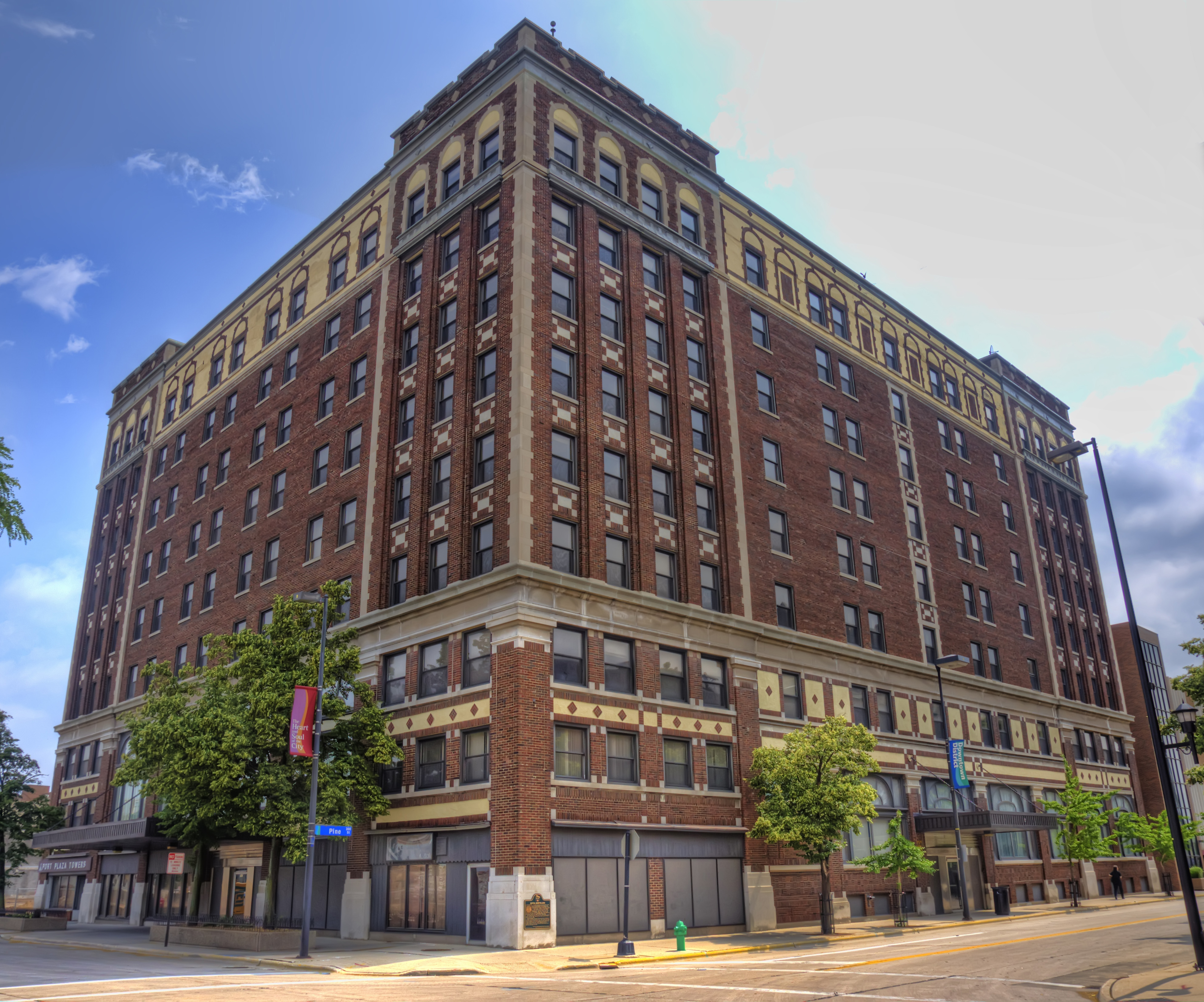
- Interactive map of the Hotel Northland area

General information
- Status: Open
- Type: Hotel / Building
- Architectural style: Tudor Revival
- Location: 304 North Adams St., Green Bay, WI, USA
- Coordinates: 44.5159607°N 88.0131675°W
- Opened: March 21, 1924
- Renovated: 2016
- Renovation cost: $44 million

Technical details
- Floor count: 10

Design and construction
- Architects: Herbert W. Tullgren, T.J. Kelly

Other information
- Number of rooms: 160
- Public transit: Green Bay Metro
- Hotel Northland
- U.S. National Register of Historic Places
- NRHP reference No.: 13000860
- Added to NRHP: October 30, 2013

The Hotel Northland is a historic hotel located on North Adams Street in downtown Green Bay, Wisconsin. It is listed on the Wisconsin State Register of Historic Places. The Hotel Northland opened on March 21, 1924 as the largest hotel in Wisconsin. Away teams playing against the Green Bay Packers would stay here and it is one of the stops on the Packers Heritage Trail.

Many famous guests stayed at the hotel, such as Lon Chaney, John F. Kennedy, Eleanor Roosevelt, and Vince Lombardi. It was also where Senator Eugene McCarthy - then running for president in the 1968 Democratic Primary - was given the news by Senator Ted Kennedy, that his brother Robert F. Kennedy, would be announcing his presidential run the following day. It was later turned into a senior residence as the Port Plaza Towers, connected to the former mall of the same name.

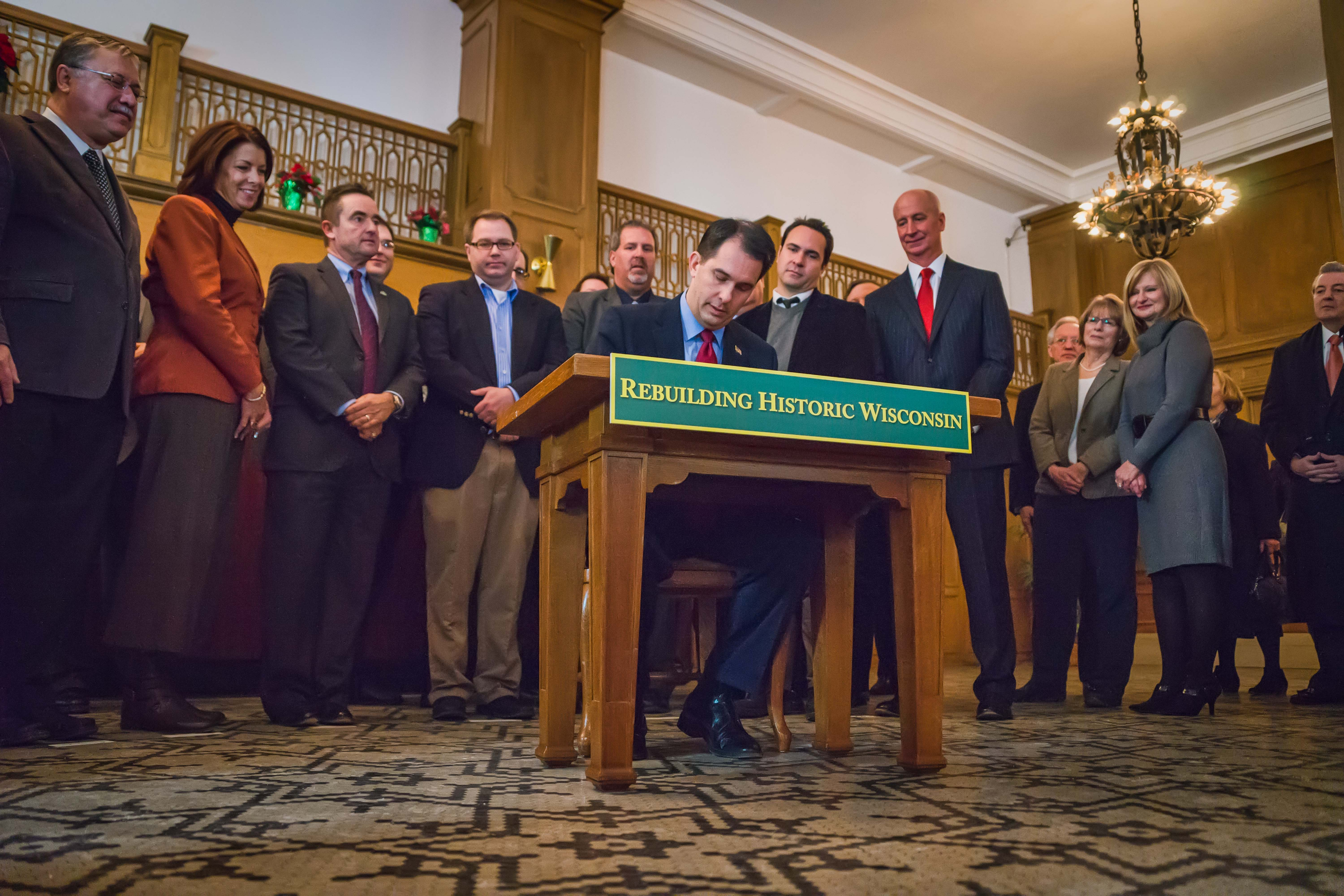
On December 11, 2013, Wisconsin Governor Scott Walker visited Hotel Northland and signed a Historic Tax Credit Bill.

On December 11, 2013, Wisconsin Governor Scott Walker visited Hotel Northland and signed a bill offering nearly $7 million in tax credits toward a $35 million renovation project aimed at revitalizing the property back to a boutique hotel. Construction began in January 2016. The hotel reopened February 14, 2019 as part of Marriott's Autograph Collection division.
