= National Register of Historic Places listings in Milwaukee =

This list comprises buildings, sites, structures, districts, and objects in the City of Milwaukee, Wisconsin, which are listed on the National Register of Historic Places. There are 293 NRHP sites listed in Milwaukee County, including 73 outside the City of Milwaukee included in the National Register of Historic Places listings in Milwaukee County, Wisconsin and 219 in the city, listed below. Two previously listed sites in the city have been removed.

This National Park Service list is complete through NPS recent listings posted November 13, 2026.

== Current listings ==
| | Name on the Register | Image | Date listed | Location | Description |
|---|---|---|---|---|---|
| 1 | 16th Street Viaduct | 16th Street Viaduct | May 7, 2019 (#100003908) | N. 16th from W. Clybourn to W. Pierce Sts. 43°02′09″N 87°55′59″W | 4000-foot viaduct across the Menomonee River valley, over which in 1967 the Youth Council of the NAACP, advised by Father Groppi, led marches from the black north side into the all-white south side, forcing city leaders to address housing discrimination practices. |
| 2 | 20th Street School | | June 4, 2020 (#100005256) | 2442 North 20th St. 43°03′48″N 87°56′15″W | Built in 1902 as the Tenth District Primary School No. 2, the building was designed by Van Ryn & DeGelleke in Italianate style. In 1964 civil rights organizers selected this as one of the schools for the first protests against segregation in Milwaukee Public Schools. |
| 3 | 27th and Wells Streets Commercial Historic District | 27th and Wells Streets Commercial Historic District | November 8, 2016 (#16000767) | 757, 760, 800-810, 801-813, 817-831, 820-826 N.27th St., 2632, 2711 W. Wells St. 43°02′25″N 87°56′52″W | Intact commercial neighborhood on the 27th Street streetcar line, including the 1916 Baebenroth's Pharmacy, the Elizabethan Revival-style West Point Apartments, the 1925 Mediterranean Revival Cecelia Apartments, the 1926 Mediterranean Revival Tower Theater, and the 1928 Liberty Building, which was converted to Doctors' Hospital in 1949. |
| 4 | 37th Street School | | May 28, 2020 (#100005225) | 1715 North 37th St. 43°03′10″N 87°57′36″W | 3.5-story brick building designed by George Birnback in Romanesque Revival style, built in 1903 with modern conveniences like central heating, indoor plumbing, and electricity. Served the Washington Park neighborhood as a school and social center until 2005. |
| 5 | 100 East Building | 100 East Building | January 16, 2025 (#100011290) | 100 East Wisconsin Avenue; 43°02′19″N 87°54′34″W | Postmodern-style office tower designed by Clark Harris Tribble & Li and built by Mortenson Construction in 1989. The arches at the bottom echo those from the 1891 Pabst Building and the shaped parapets and other elements at the top allude to old Flemish/German Renaissance Revival buildings like Pabst and the nearby 1895 City Hall. |
| 6 | Abbot Row | Abbot Row | March 3, 1983 (#83003402) | 1019-1043 E. Ogden Ave. 43°02′52″N 87°53′53″W | Picturesque Queen Anne-style rowhouse of ten 3-story apartments, each with a private garden and patio. Designed by Howland Russel and built in 1889 for Edwin H. Abbot of the Wisconsin Central RR. |
| 7 | Charles Abresch House | Charles Abresch House | January 16, 1986 (#86000095) | 2126 W. Juneau Ave. 43°02′46″N 87°56′25″W | 2.5 story Queen Anne home with 3-story tower, designed by Frederick Velguth and built in 1890. Abresch was a German immigrant who initially specialized in building beer wagons. Later his Charles Abresch Company transitioned to build car and truck bodies. |
| 8 | Emanuel D. Adler House | Emanuel D. Adler House | September 13, 1991 (#91001397) | 1681 N. Prospect Ave. 43°03′09″N 87°53′30″W | 3-story brick and stone Queen Anne home with Romanesque Revival elements, designed by Alfred Clas and built in 1888. Adler and his family ran a business that made ready-to-wear clothing. |
| 9 | All Saints' Episcopal Cathedral Complex | All Saints' Episcopal Cathedral Complex | December 27, 1974 (#74000099) | 804–828 E. Juneau Ave. 43°02′46″N 87°54′06″W | 1868 Gothic Revival cathedral with 200-foot tower, designed by E. Townsend Mix, originally as Olivet Congregational Church. Also guild hall and bishop's manse. |
| 10 | Charles Allis House | Charles Allis House | January 17, 1975 (#75000072) | 1630 E. Royall Pl. 43°03′13″N 87°53′25″W | 1911 Tudor-style mansion, home to Charles Allis, designed by Alexander Eschweiler. |
| 11 | American System Built Homes-Burnham Street District | American System Built Homes-Burnham Street District | September 12, 1985 (#85002166) | W. Burnham St. 43°00′38″N 87°56′55″W | Cluster of six affordable Prairie style Frank Lloyd Wright-designed homes and duplexes built in 1915 by the Richards Company as demonstration models of Wright's system of standard designs and precut parts. |
| 12 | Astor on the Lake | Astor on the Lake | September 6, 1984 (#84003715) | 924 E. Juneau Ave. 43°02′46″N 87°54′01″W | 8-story Classical Revival-style hotel designed by Herbert Tullgren and built in 1920 a few blocks from Lake Michigan. |
| 13 | Baasen House-German YMCA | Baasen House-German YMCA | August 2, 1984 (#84003718) | 1702 N. 4th St. 43°03′10″N 87°54′51″W | 1874 2-story home of railroad man and leading Catholic John Baasen, designed by Charles Gombert. Housed offices of German YMCA from 1888 to 1893. Used by Mt. Sinai Hospital starting in 1905, Wisconsin House Hotel in 1919, and Joe Kerscher's tavern in 1933. |
| 14 | Lloyd A. Barbee House | Lloyd A. Barbee House | May 7, 2019 (#100003940) | 321 E. Meinecke Ave. 43°03′44″N 87°54′26″W | Modest home built in 1890 of Lloyd Barbee, Wisconsin's leading civil rights activist of the 20th century, who pushed to integrate Milwaukee's schools. |
| 15 | Baumbach Building | Baumbach Building | March 3, 1983 (#83003403) | 302 N. Broadway St. 43°02′03″N 87°54′25″W | 5-story Chicago School structure designed by German architect Eugene R. Liebert for prominent German-Milwaukeean Ernest Von Baumbach and built in 1900. Initially housed the Cohen Brothers clothes factory. |
| 16 | Bay View Historic District | Bay View Historic District | August 23, 1982 (#82000686) | Roughly bounded by Lake Michigan, Meredith, Superior, Nock, Wentworth, Pryor, Clair, RR tracks and Conway St. 42°59′41″N 87°54′20″W | Fairly intact part of the Milwaukee Iron Company's company town, with 330 buildings including workers' cottages built in the 1870s, larger houses where managers lived, the Garibaldi Club, and the South Shore Park Bathhouse. |
| 17 | Blatz Brewery Complex | Blatz Brewery Complex | April 15, 1986 (#86000793) | 1101–1147 N. Broadway; 43°02′42″N 87°54′32″W | Three historic stockhouses from the old Blatz brewery plant, built in 1891, 1904 and 1906 – all in German Renaissance Revival style. |
| 18 | Valentin Blatz Brewing Company Office Building | Valentin Blatz Brewing Company Office Building | March 31, 1983 (#83003404) | 1120 N. Broadway; 43°02′44″N 87°54′29″W | Brewery office built in 1890, designed by Herman Schnetzky in Richardsonian Romanesque style. Now part of Milwaukee School of Engineering. |
| 19 | Blommer Ice Cream Company | Blommer Ice Cream Company | August 31, 2017 (#100001574) | 1502 W. North Ave. 43°03′38″N 87°55′54″W | Factory begun in 1910 with glazed brick, then expanded in 1927 with a cream-colored terra cotta finish designed by Verner H. Esser, aiming to inspire consumer confidence with its clean, modern finish. |
| 20 | Frederick C. Bogk House | Frederick C. Bogk House | October 18, 1972 (#72000058) | 2420 N. Terrace Ave. 43°03′42″N 87°52′36″W | 1917 Frank Lloyd Wright-designed residence, with influences from Japanese architecture and Mayan decoration. |
| 21 | Brewers Hill Historic District | Brewers Hill Historic District | August 2, 1984 (#84003745) | Vine, Reservoir, Palmer, 1st, 2nd, and Brown Sts. •Boundary increase (listed April 27, 1995, refnum 95000449): Roughly, Brown and Lloyd Sts. and Garfield and North Aves. from 2nd St. to Hubbard St. 43°03′17″N 87°54′48″W | Diverse neighborhood north of the old Schlitz and Blatz breweries, where a laborer's cottage could stand across the street from a manager's Queen Anne-style home. |
| 22 | Herman W. Buemming House | Herman W. Buemming House | January 18, 1990 (#89002315) | 1012 E. Pleasant St. 43°03′02″N 87°53′56″W | 1901 Classical Revival-style frame house designed to suggest a Greek temple, with a 2-story portico with Ionic capitals and a lunette window in the pediment. Buemming designed the home for his own family. Later home to art critic Frances Stover and theater manager Clair Richardson. |
| 23 | J. L. Burnham Block | J. L. Burnham Block | February 11, 1988 (#88000086) | 907–911 W. National Ave. 43°01′24″N 87°55′22″W | Largely intact Italianate-style commercial building with a meeting hall on its third story, designed by E. Townsend Mix and built in 1875 by cream city brickmaker J.L. Burnham. |
| 24 | Elias A. Calkins Doublehouse | Elias A. Calkins Doublehouse | January 18, 1990 (#89002313) | 1612–1614 E. Kane Pl. 43°03′21″N 87°53′25″W | High Victorian Gothic-style frame doublehouse designed by James Douglas and built in 1875 for Calkins, a newspaperman and Civil War veteran. |
| 25 | Calvary Baptist Church | | July 9, 2026 (#100013194) | 2959 North Teutonia Avenue; 43°04′22″N 87°55′51″W | Church complex designed by William Wenzler with low, irregular shapes drawn from traditional compounds of Cameroon in west Africa and built in 1970. Calvary's congregation is descended from the oldest African-American Baptist church in Milwaukee, founded in 1895. |
| 26 | Calvary Presbyterian Church | Calvary Presbyterian Church | March 10, 1986 (#86000098) | 935 W. Wisconsin Ave. 43°02′18″N 87°55′27″W | Gothic Revival church designed by Koch & Hess and built in 1870, with a colossal corner tower. |
| 27 | Carleton District #3 School | | July 18, 2025 (#100012027) | 4116 West Silver Spring Drive; 43°07′10″N 87°57′51″W | Art Deco-style public school complex begun in 1916 as the 3rd school of the Town of Granville. Expanded a half dozen times, including a big one in 1941 supported by funds and labor from the New Deal's WPA. |
| 28 | Michael Carpenter House | Michael Carpenter House | January 16, 1986 (#86000096) | 1115 N 35th St. 43°02′43″N 87°57′28″W | 2.5-story Queen Anne-style home clad in brick and shingles, built in 1890 for Carpenter, a baker and director of Nabisco. |
| 29 | Cass-Juneau Street Historic District | Cass-Juneau Street Historic District | November 3, 1988 (#88002389) | Roughly bounded by E. Knapp and Marshall Sts., Juneau Ave., and Van Buren St. 43°02′47″N 87°54′08″W | A fragment of the old Yankee Hill neighborhood on the lower east side, including the William Metcalf house, which started as a Greek Revival-style home in 1854, the 1862 early-Italianate Carey house, the 1874 full-on Italianate Inbusch house, the 1883 Queen Anne-style Brandt doublehouse, the 1904 Gothic Revival-style Summerfield United Methodist church, and the 1923 Georgian Revival-style St. John's home. |
| 30 | Cass-Wells Street Historic District | Cass-Wells Street Historic District | June 13, 1986 (#86001325) | 712, 718, and 724 E. Wells St. and 801, 809, 815, 819, and 823 N. Cass St. 43°02′31″N 87°54′08″W | Another fragment of the old Yankee Hill, including the 1870 Italianate Hutchinson house (pictured), the 1892 Queen Anne Parker house, the 1897 Tudor Revival Mrs. Willis Danforth house, and the 1904 Dutch Colonial Revival Charles Danforth house. |
| 31 | Central Library | Central Library | December 30, 1974 (#74000101) | 814 W. Wisconsin Ave. 43°02′22″N 87°55′21″W | Ferry & Clas-designed 1895 Renaissance-style library, with the side shown at left perhaps inspired by the Louvre in Paris. |
| 32 | Century Building | Century Building | August 28, 2017 (#100001520) | 808 N. Old World Third St., 230 W. Wells St. 43°02′25″N 87°54′51″W | 8-story office building with commercial space at street level, designed by Alfred S. Alschuler in Neoclassical style and built in 1925. |
| 33 | Chief Lippert Fire Station | Chief Lippert Fire Station | October 28, 1988 (#88002007) | 642 W. North Ave. 43°03′38″N 87°55′10″W | 1876 Italianate-style fire station, initially built to house a "chemical fire engine" in a neighborhood that had no water mains. |
| 34 | Christ Evangelical Lutheran Church | Christ Evangelical Lutheran Church | September 25, 1987 (#87001735) | 2235 W. Greenfield Ave. 43°01′00″N 87°56′31″W | Gothic Revival-style church designed by Frederick Velguth and built in 1901 by its German Lutheran congregation. |
| 35 | Coakley Brothers Warehouse | Coakley Brothers Warehouse | October 19, 2018 (#100003035) | 3742 W Wisconsin Ave. 43°02′20″N 87°57′40″W | 7-story Mediterranean Revival-style building with clock tower, designed by Eschweiler & Eschweiler and built in 1928 for storing the surplus possessions of the upper middle class residents of the West Side. |
| 36 | Commerce Street Power Plant | Commerce Street Power Plant | June 25, 1999 (#99000761) | 1338 N. Commerce St. 43°02′49″N 87°54′48″W | 4-story coal-burning power plant designed by Herman Esser and built 1903–1911, with 3-story round-arched windows and clerestory window. The switch house was added in 1911 and expanded in 1941. The 7-story Art Deco boiler house was added in 1941. |
| 37 | Concordia Historic District | Concordia Historic District | July 30, 1985 (#85001688) | Roughly bounded by West State, N. 27th, W. Kilbourn Ave. and N. 35th St. 43°02′32″N 87°57′09″W | Large historic neighborhood around what was once Concordia College, including the 1851 Italianate-style Faries house, the 1868 Gothic Revival-style Yates house, the 1888 Queen Anne-style Eiring house, the 1890 Shingle style Bancker house, the 1891 Dutch Colonial Revival Reynolds house, the 1897 Colonial Revival Strong duplex, the 1897 Neoclassical Meissner house, and the 1900 Beaux Arts-style Concordia classroom building. |
| 38 | Congregation Beth Israel Synagogue | Congregation Beth Israel Synagogue | March 5, 1992 (#92000107) | 2432 N. Teutonia Ave. 43°03′47″N 87°55′43″W | 1925 synagogue in Byzantine Revival style. Sold in 1960 and converted into the Greater Galilee Missionary Baptist Church. |
| 39 | Thomas Cook House | Thomas Cook House | January 16, 1986 (#86000104) | 853 N. Seventeenth St. 43°02′29″N 87°56′03″W | High Victorian Gothic house designed by E. Townsend Mix and built in 1875 for Cook, who owned a quarry business. |
| 40 | Edward J. Dahinden House | Edward J. Dahinden House | February 25, 1986 (#86000313) | 3316 W. Wisconsin Ave. 43°02′21″N 87°57′20″W | Craftsman-style house built in 1914 for an executive of the Franzen Paper Company. |
| 41 | Desmond-Farnham-Hustis House | Desmond-Farnham-Hustis House | January 18, 1990 (#89002314) | 1535 N. Marshall St. 43°03′00″N 87°54′03″W | Very intact High Victorian Gothic-style home built in 1876, with scroll-sawn bargeboards and iron cresting, and a matching carriage house behind. Thomas Desmond was secretary of the Milwaukee school board, William Farnham worked life insurance, and John Hustis developed real estate. |
| 42 | Dover Street School and Social Center | Dover Street School and Social Center | May 10, 2016 (#16000239) | 619 E. Dover St. 42°59′50″N 87°54′05″W | Public school building begun in 1889, which also provided evening and weekend activities for children and adults in the Bay View neighborhood – an example of Milwaukee's "lighted schoolhouses" idea and the larger Social Center movement. |
| 43 | Eagle Knitting Mills | Eagle Knitting Mills | November 12, 2020 (#100005754) | 507 South 2nd St. 43°01′34″N 87°54′45″W | 4-story reinforced-concrete structure built in 1928 to house David and Max Karger's knitting factory, which produced knit sweaters, scarfs and Eagleknit headwear, employing as many as 700 – mostly women. Shipping and receiving was in the basement, offices and stock rooms on the first floor, and production on the upper floors. |
| 44 | Eagles Club | Eagles Club | July 29, 1986 (#86002096) | 2401 W. Wisconsin Ave. 43°02′18″N 87°56′35″W | 1920s ballroom, belonging to the Fraternal Order of Eagles, architect Russell Barr Williamson; part of the West Side Area MRA |
| 45 | East Brady Street Historic District | East Brady Street Historic District | March 9, 1990 (#90000363) | E. Brady St. from N. Farwell Ave. to N. Van Buren St. 43°03′11″N 87°53′52″W | Commercial center of a Polish neighborhood that grew around St. Hedwig's from 1865 to the 1920s – many of them immigrants working in the steel and leather industries. Italians moved in from the 1920s to 1950s, and counter-culture in the 1960s. |
| 46 | East Oregon and South Barclay Industrial Historic District | East Oregon and South Barclay Industrial Historic District | December 29, 2014 (#14001112) | 300 S. Barclay, 139, 221 E. Oregon & 214 E. Florida Sts. 43°01′39″N 87°54′34″W | Cluster of historic factory buildings at Walker's Point, including the 1925 Art Deco-style Pittsburgh Plate Glass-Dry Color Factory and its 1927 Mixmax Lacquer Plant, the 1927 International-style Hydrite Chemical Building H, and the 1948 Art Moderne Building #20. |
| 47 | East Side Commercial Historic District | East Side Commercial Historic District | September 23, 1986 (#86002325) | Roughly bounded by E. Wells St., N. Jefferson St. and N. Broadway, Michigan and E. Clybourn, and N. Water Sts. 43°02′18″N 87°54′26″W | Fairly intact part of the old central business district, including the 1858 Greek Revival-style Webber townhouse, the 1860 Italianate Iron Block, the 1878 Second Empire-style Mitchell building, the 1879 High Italianate-style Mackie Building, which housed the Grain Exchange, the 1883 Queen Anne-style Milwaukee Club, the 1890 Richardsonian Romanesque Pfister Hotel, the 1901 Beaux Arts Wells building, the 1925 Mediterranean Revival Watts building, the 1916 French Gothic-style Wisconsin Telephone building, and the 1937 Moderne-style Mariner building. |
| 48 | East Village Historic District | East Village Historic District | January 21, 2004 (#03001486) | Generally bounded by North Humboldt, East Brady, North Warren and Milwaukee R 43°03′19″N 87°53′45″W | Working class residential neighborhood settled chiefly by Polish immigrants starting in the 1860s. Many of the houses are workers' cottages like the 1881 Rewolinski house and "Polish flats" on raised foundations, like the 1900 Stan Toyar house. Some lots contain an extra "rear house" or two. Interspersed are businesses like the 1903 Wolski's Tavern and more stylish buildings like the Craftsman-style Stormowski duplex. |
| 49 | Abraham H. Esbenshade House | Abraham H. Esbenshade House | January 16, 1986 (#86000106) | 3119 W. Wells St. 43°02′25″N 87°57′13″W | Late Queen Anne house with unusual Flemish Renaissance gable and bell-shaped dome on turret, designed by Crane and Barkhausen and built in 1899. |
| 50 | Exton Apartments Building | Exton Apartments Building | January 9, 1997 (#96001576) | 1260 N. Prospect Ave. 43°02′49″N 87°53′45″W | 1938 nine-story apartment building designed by architect Herbert Tullgren. In its day the Exton offered modern living, from its Art Moderne exterior to air conditioning inside. |
| 51 | Federal Building | Federal Building | March 14, 1973 (#73000082) | 515–519 E. Wisconsin Ave. 43°02′17″N 87°54′16″W | 5-story Richardsonian Romanesque federal building and courthouse designed by Willoughby J. Edbrooke and built in the 1890s. |
| 52 | Otto F. Fiebing House | Otto F. Fiebing House | September 12, 1985 (#85002022) | 1302 N. Hawley Rd. 43°02′51″N 87°59′01″W | 1.5-story Tudor Revival-style house clad in Tennessee quartzite with ridge dormers and round-capped chimneys, built in 1924 by Arnold F. Meyer & Co. using one of Ernest Flagg's designs. Fiebing was the first owner, and the brother-in-law of Meyer. |
| 53 | Fifteenth District School | | August 26, 2021 (#100006834) | 2001 West Vliet St. 43°02′54″N 87°56′18″W | Historic brick public school, with the oldest 1885 section designed by Frederick Seyring, a second section added by 1894, the westernmost block designed by Mollerus & Lotter and added in 1898, and a Contemporary-style addition in the 1950s. MPS closed the school in the 1970s. |
| 54 | Fifth Street School | Fifth Street School | March 5, 2018 (#100002175) | 2770 N 5th St. 43°04′08″N 87°55′01″W | 3.5-story brick public school designed in Romanesque Revival style by German-born Milwaukee architect Herman Schnetzky and built in 1888. Expanded in 1908 and 1960. |
| 55 | First Church of Christ, Scientist | First Church of Christ, Scientist | March 8, 1989 (#89000070) | 1443–1451 N. Prospect Ave. 43°02′57″N 87°53′41″W | Neoclassical-style Christian Science church designed by S.S. Beman and built in 1907. |
| 56 | First Unitarian Church | First Unitarian Church | December 30, 1974 (#74000102) | 1009 E. Ogden Ave. 43°02′53″N 87°53′57″W | 1891-2 Gothic Revival church designed by Milwaukee architects Ferry & Clas. |
| 57 | First Ward Triangle Historic District | First Ward Triangle Historic District | March 19, 1987 (#87000489) | Roughly Franklin Pl., N. Prospect and E. Juneau Aves., and E. Knapp St. 43°02′47″N 87°53′50″W | Intact group of high style Victorian homes just south of Burns Park, including the 1855/1860/1895/1984 now-Neoclassical Diederichs house, the 1874 Italianate Prentiss house, the 1874 High Victorian Gothic Downer house, the 1875 Queen Anne Rublee house, the 1887 Queen Anne/Romanesque Miller house, the 1890 wooden Queen Anne Forsythe house, and the 1896 Elizabethan Revival Hawley house. |
| 58 | Florida and Third Industrial Historic District | Florida and Third Industrial Historic District | July 10, 2008 (#08000656) | 234–500 (N side) W. Florida St., 222 W. Pittsburgh Ave., 212, 222, 305, 331 S. Third St., 400 S. Fifth St. 43°01′39″N 87°54′46″W | Group of 11 multi-story factories built from 1891 to 1928 near the Soo Line Railroad yard, including an 1891 gas stove factory, a factory that made looseleaf notebooks, a bedding company, a candy company, and two seed companies. |
| 59 | Forest Home Cemetery and Chapel | Forest Home Cemetery and Chapel | November 3, 1980 (#80000166) | 2405 Forest Home Ave. 42°59′53″N 87°56′35″W | Resting place for many noted Milwaukee residents, including beer barons, industrialists and politicians, founded 1850. |
| 60 | Christian Foth House | Christian Foth House | March 22, 1988 (#88000218) | 1209–1211 S. Seventh St. 43°01′08″N 87°55′11″W | Modest 2-story frame gabled ell house built in 1867, probably by German immigrant Foth, a ship carpenter and grocer. The Komschlies bought the house in 1890 and lived there at least into the 1980s. |
| 61 | Fourth Street School | Fourth Street School | August 2, 1984 (#84003720) | 333 W. Galena St. 43°03′03″N 87°54′55″W | Young Jewish-Ukrainian refugee Golda Mabovitch attended this school from 1906 to 1912, before going to Palestine and eventually becoming Prime Minister of Israel Golda Meir. |
| 62 | Friedmann Row | Friedmann Row | April 12, 1996 (#96000420) | 1537, 1539, 1541, 1543 N. Cass St. and 731 E. Pleasant St. 43°03′02″N 87°54′08″W | Row house built in 1891, designed by W.A. Holbrook in Queen Anne style, which is unusual for row houses. |
| 63 | Gallun Tannery Historic District | Gallun Tannery Historic District | August 2, 1984 (#84003721) | Holton and Water Sts. 43°03′20″N 87°54′05″W | Intact tannery complex along the Milwaukee River owned by German immigrant August F. Gallun, including a number of early buildings, the 1894 Ferry & Clas-designed office building, and the 1905 hide house. Almost entirely demolished in 2005. |
| 64 | Garden Homes Historic District | Garden Homes Historic District | May 4, 1990 (#90000669) | Roughly bounded by W. Ruby and N. Teutonia Aves., N. 24th Pl., W. Atkinson Ave. and N. 27th St. 43°05′51″N 87°56′41″W | First public housing project in the U.S., built in 1923 by the City of Milwaukee under socialist mayor Daniel Hoan to ease the city's housing shortage, based on ideas from Britain's garden city movement. |
| 65 | German-English Academy | German-English Academy | April 11, 1977 (#77000037) | 1020 N. Broadway; 43°02′39″N 87°54′29″W | Romanesque Revival school built 1891–92 to house a private Academy started in 1851 by German immigrants to promote German language and culture. Designed by Crane and Barkhausen. |
| 66 | Germania Building | Germania Building | July 7, 1983 (#83003405) | 135 W. Wells St. 43°02′23″N 87°54′45″W | 1896 home to Germania Publishing Company, designed by Schnetzky & Liebert with 'Kaiser's Helmet' domes on the corners. Largest office building in the city at the time. George Brumder's company produced German-language publications, but the name was changed to Brumder Building in 1918 due to anti-German feelings. |
| 67 | Gesu Church | Gesu Church | January 16, 1986 (#86000108) | 1145 W. Wisconsin Ave. 43°02′18″N 87°55′38″W | Twin-spired French Gothic-style Catholic church designed by Henry C. Koch and built in 1893. |
| 68 | Gimbels Parking Pavilion | Gimbels Parking Pavilion | March 29, 2001 (#01000310) | 555 N. Plankinton Ave. 43°02′13″N 87°54′43″W | Art moderne monument to postwar suburban mobility, built by the Gimbels store in 1947. |
| 69 | Goodwill Industries Building | Goodwill Industries Building | July 14, 2004 (#04000714) | 2102 W. Pierce St. 43°01′29″N 87°56′22″W | Training center where Oliver and Robert Friedman developed innovative rehab programs for the blind and mentally handicapped in the 1930s and 40s. |
| 70 | Graham Row | Graham Row | July 27, 1979 (#79000095) | 1501, 1503, and 1507 N. Marshall St. 43°02′58″N 87°54′04″W | 2.5-story cream brick row house built in 1880 by Irish immigrant stonemason John Graham, whose family lived there. Its round arches and rough stone trim are elements of Romanesque Revival style. |
| 71 | Grand Avenue Congregational Church | Grand Avenue Congregational Church | January 16, 1986 (#86000110) | 2133 W. Wisconsin Ave. 43°02′18″N 87°56′25″W | Romanesque Revival-style church designed by E. Townsend Mix and built 1887–88 for progressive Congregational congregation. |
| 72 | Grand Avenue Elementary School | Grand Avenue Elementary School | March 23, 2018 (#100002236) | 2708 W. Wisconsin Ave. 43°02′19″N 87°56′54″W | Very intact 3-story elementary school designed by Van Ryn & DeGelleke in Collegiate Gothic style and built in 1921. Served as a school until 2007. |
| 73 | Thomas A. Greene Memorial Museum | Thomas A. Greene Memorial Museum | November 4, 1993 (#93001615) | 3367 N. Downer Ave. 43°04′44″N 87°52′41″W | Built in 1913 to house the fossils and minerals collected by Milwaukee druggist and amateur geologist Greene, including fossilized trilobites, crinoids and corals from the dolomite outcrops of southeastern Wisconsin. |
| 74 | Harley-Davidson Motor Company Factory No. 7 | Harley-Davidson Motor Company Factory No. 7 | December 14, 2020 (#100005901) | 228 South 1st St. 43°01′43″N 87°54′39″W | 3-story industrial loft designed by Kirchoff & Rose and built in 1912 for the motorcycle maker. |
| 75 | Harley-Davidson Motorcycle Factory Building | Harley-Davidson Motorcycle Factory Building | November 9, 1994 (#86003850) | 3700 W. Juneau Ave. (1147 N. Thirty-eighth St.); 43°02′45″N 87°57′40″W | Industrial buildings built from 1910 to 1926, where William S. Harley invented the first commercially successful motorcycle clutch, the step starter, the carburetor choke, an 2 and 3-speed transmissions. |
| 76 | Highland Avenue Methodist Church | Highland Avenue Methodist Church | January 16, 1986 (#86000114) | 2024 W. Highland Ave. 43°02′41″N 87°56′19″W | German Gothic-style church built in 1891 by the first German Methodist congregation in Wisconsin. |
| 77 | Highland Boulevard Historic District | Highland Boulevard Historic District | July 30, 1985 (#85001686) | W. Highland Blvd. roughly bounded by N. 33rd and N. 29th Sts. 43°02′41″N 87°57′09″W | String of mansions and large houses on large lots facing the landscaped esplanade down Highland Boulevard, including the 1897 Beaux Arts-style Koch house, the 1897 Queen Anne-style Manegold house, the 1898 Elizabethan Revival-style Gustav Pabst house, the 1905 German Renaissance Revival Starke house, the 1911 Prairie School Weinhagen house, and the 1917 Stroble bungalow. |
| 78 | Historic Third Ward District | Historic Third Ward District | March 8, 1984 (#84003724) | Bounded by the Milwaukee River, C&NW RR, and E. St. Paul and N. Jackson Sts. 43°01′56″N 87°54′26″W | Historic warehouse and factory district rebuilt after the fire of 1892. Irish settlers dominated before that, shifting to Italian businesses in the early 1900s. |
| 79 | Alfred M. Hoelz House | Alfred M. Hoelz House | September 12, 1985 (#85002029) | 34493451 Frederick Ave. 43°04′49″N 87°53′02″W | 1.5-story Tudor Revival-style double-house clad in Tennessee quartzite with ridge dormers and round-capped chimneys, built in 1925 by Arnold F. Meyer & Co. using one of Ernest Flagg's designs. |
| 80 | Holy Trinity Roman Catholic Church | Holy Trinity Roman Catholic Church | November 7, 1972 (#72000062) | 605 S. 4th St. 43°01′30″N 87°54′57″W | Zopfstil-style church built in 1850 by German-speaking Catholic parish. Now one of the oldest surviving church buildings in Milwaukee, and very intact. |
| 81 | Home Office, Northwestern Mutual Life Insurance Company | Home Office, Northwestern Mutual Life Insurance Company | March 20, 1973 (#73000083) | 605–623 N. Broadway; 43°02′16″N 87°54′28″W | Luxurious 5-story office building designed by Solon Spencer Beman in Richardsonian Romanesque style and built 1885–86 for Northwestern Mutual. |
| 82 | Hotel Schroeder | Hotel Schroeder | May 9, 2024 (#100010338) | 509 West Wisconsin; 43°02′19″N 87°55′07″W | 25-story Art Deco-style hotel designed by Holabird & Roche and built in 1928 for Walter Schroeder. This is the premiere example of a chain of modern hotels that Schroeder built across Wisconsin, Michigan and Minnesota, aiming to provide hotels as good as those in large American cities. The lower four floors held public rooms and offices, the next 13 held guest rooms, and the top floor held Schroeder's own penthouse suite. |
| 83 | David W. Howie House | David W. Howie House | January 16, 1986 (#86000116) | 3026 W. Wells St. 43°02′26″N 87°57′09″W | Queen Anne-style house built in 1886 for Howie, an agent of a fuel company. Now the Manderley Bed and Breakfast. |
| 84 | Immanuel Presbyterian Church | Immanuel Presbyterian Church | December 27, 1974 (#74000104) | 1100 N. Astor St. 43°02′41″N 87°53′58″W | 1873 Gothic Revival design by E. Townsend Mix, buff-colored Wauwatosa limestone with red and gray interjections. Original interior destroyed by 1887 fire. |
| 85 | Iron Block | Iron Block | December 27, 1974 (#74000105) | 205 E. Wisconsin Ave. 43°02′18″N 87°54′32″W | Cast Iron façade, shipped from New York, built 1861. Now one of the few pre-Civil War buildings left in the central business district, and the city's main surviving example of a building with a cast iron front. |
| 86 | Johnston Hall | Johnston Hall | January 16, 1986 (#86000118) | 1121 W. Wisconsin Ave. 43°02′18″N 87°55′37″W | When built in 1907, this hall housed the whole of Marquette College. Designed by Charles D. Crane with a mix of Neogothic and Renaissance Revival stylings. |
| 87 | Jones-Hill House | | November 17, 2021 (#100004165) | 2463 N. Palmer St. 43°03′49″N 87°54′35″W | Large Arts and Crafts-style house designed by Messmer & Son and built in 1906 for William Engelbert Conrad, a tannery owner. In 1953 the house was bought by Willie and B. Fostoria Jones, African Americans involved in a number of black-owned businesses in Bronzeville, and the basement bar became a local social center. Miss Eva Hill bought the house in 1967. |
| 88 | Joseph B. Kalvelage House | Joseph B. Kalvelage House | May 23, 1978 (#78000118) | 2432 W. Kilbourn Ave. 43°02′30″N 87°56′38″W | Kalvelage was a son of German immigrants and secretary-treasurer of a company that made plumbing fixtures. In 1897 he built this house, designed by Otto Strack (German immigrant) in the German Baroque style with atlantes, tin lions, and a mansard roof, similar to what was popular in the homeland at that time. The iron work is by Cyril Colnik. |
| 89 | Sanford R. Kane House | Sanford R. Kane House | September 13, 1991 (#91001398) | 1841 N. Prospect Ave. 43°03′15″N 87°53′22″W | Queen Anne style mansion designed by James Douglas and built in 1883 for Kane, hotelier and a manager of Siloam Mineral Spring Co. |
| 90 | Kenwood Park–Prospect Hill Historic District | Kenwood Park–Prospect Hill Historic District | March 7, 2002 (#02000185) | Roughly bounded by N. Hackett Ave., E. Edgewood Ave., N. Lake Dr. and E. Newberry Ave. 43°04′33″N 87°52′30″W | Large neighborhood on a bluff on the upper east side, including the 1895 Queen Anne-style Schmitt house, the 1906 Neoclassical-style Dearholt house, the 1909 Colonial Revival Ellsworth house, the 1911 Georgian Revival Akin house, the 1912 Craftsman Schley house, the 1912 Prairie style Engelhardt house, the 1912 Tudor Revival Upham house, the 1916 Arts and Crafts-style Black house, and the 1924 Mediterranean Revival Kern house. |
| 91 | Frederick Ketter Warehouse | Frederick Ketter Warehouse | August 2, 1984 (#84003725) | 325 W. Vine St. 43°03′13″N 87°54′54″W | Romanesque and German Renaissance-style structure built for Frederick Ketter about 1891, probably as a grocery warehouse. Bought by Walter Geiger in 1926 and used as a junk shop, plaster studio, flax seed warehouse, a bottling plant for horseradish and honey, and for light manufacturing. |
| 92 | Kilbourn Avenue Row House Historic District | Kilbourn Avenue Row House Historic District | February 25, 1986 (#86000311) | Roughly bounded by N. 14th St., W. Kilbourn Ave., and N. 15th St. 43°02′29″N 87°55′53″W | Four-block cluster of historic residences including five row houses. Includes the 1874 Italianate-style Krause cottage, the 1891 Queen Anne-style Breslauer house, the 1897 German Renaissance Revival Breslauer Doublehouse, the 1897 Queen Anne Starke Row, the 1897 Trimborn Row (pictured), and the 1899 Queen Anne Forrestal Apartments. |
| 93 | Kilbourn Masonic Temple | Kilbourn Masonic Temple | January 16, 1986 (#86000121) | 827 N. Eleventh St. 43°02′26″N 87°55′35″W | Masonic temple designed by Herman Schnetzky in simple Classical Revival style and built in 1911 for Kilbourn Lodge #3. |
| 94 | Kinnickinnic River Parkway | Kinnickinnic River Parkway | July 14, 2011 (#11000462) | Between S. 72nd & S. 16th Sts. 42°59′51″N 87°57′49″W | Strip of urban parkland along the Kinnickinnic River connecting Jackson Park and Pulaski Park. Designed by Charles Whitnall and Alfred Boerner and built starting in 1934 during the Great Depression with help from the Works Progress Administration. |
| 95 | Knapp-Astor House | Knapp-Astor House | March 27, 1980 (#80000167) | 930 E. Knapp St. and 1301 N. Astor St. 43°02′49″N 87°53′59″W | 2.5-story townhouse designed by Ferry & Clas with elements of Queen Anne, Colonial Revival, and Classical Revival styles and built in 1891 for Frank W. Montgomery, then principal stockholder of the Badger Knitting Company. |
| 96 | Knickerbocker Hotel | Knickerbocker Hotel | June 2, 1988 (#88000680) | 1028 E. Juneau Ave. 43°02′45″N 87°53′56″W | 8-story late Neoclassical residential apartment hotel built in 1929, designed by Rossman & Wierdsma. |
| 97 | Koeffler-Baumgarten Double House | Koeffler-Baumgarten Double House | November 12, 2020 (#100005755) | 817–819 North Marshall St. 43°02′31″N 87°54′02″W | 2.5-story structure designed by Ferry & Clas in German Renaissance Revival style and built in 1898 for children of German immigrants. Charles Koeffler Jr. and his family lived in the south unit while his sister Hermine lived with her family in the north. |
| 98 | Koelsch Funeral Home | Koelsch Funeral Home | October 12, 2010 (#10000822) | 7622 W, Greenfield Ave. 43°01′00″N 88°00′30″W | Tudor Revival-style funeral home, designed by Raymond Dwyer and built in 1937 with air conditioning and a sound system – advanced for the time. |
| 99 | Lake Park | Lake Park | April 22, 1993 (#93000339) | 2900 N. Lake Dr. and 2800 E. Kenwood Blvd. 43°04′13″N 87°52′07″W | Mile-long urban park on a bluff above Lake Michigan, designed by Frederick Law Olmsted, and begun in the 1890s, now containing Bradford Beach, North Point Lighthouse, and the Milwaukee Art Museum. |
| 100 | Lakeview Hospital | | April 18, 2024 (#100010240) | 1749 North Prospect Avenue; 43°03′12″N 87°53′25″W | Early osteopathic hospital, opened in 1944 after the Wisconsin Supreme Court first allowed osteopaths to be licensed in 1920. Served patients until 1965. Before it was a hospital, the structure was a mansion/residence built around 1876, then housed the Wisconsin Institute of Music. |
| 101 | Lincoln Creek Parkway | | February 5, 2021 (#100006105) | Located between West Lincoln Creek Dr. at West Hampton Ave., and Meaux Park; 43°06′37″N 87°56′42″W | Road and park following Lincoln Creek - a segment of a network of parks designed by landscape architect Charles Whitnall in the 1920s and built starting in the 1930s with the New Deal and WPA funding. |
| 102 | LIGHT VESSEL NO. 57 (Shipwreck) | LIGHT VESSEL NO. 57 (Shipwreck) | December 23, 1991 (#91001823) | Lake Michigan near South Shore Park; 43°00′05″N 87°53′08″W | 90-foot wood-hulled boat built in 1891 and stationed until 1923 at Gray's Reef west of the Mackinac Bridge in lieu of a more expensive permanent lighthouse. Scuttled and wrecked by a storm around 1930. |
| 103 | Lindsay-Bostrom Building | Lindsay-Bostrom Building | April 26, 2002 (#02000417) | 133 W. Oregon St. 43°01′41″N 87°54′43″W | Lindsay Brothers, one of the largest wholesalers of agricultural implements in Wisconsin, built this 5-story industrial building in 1904, with John Deere Co. its first occupant. In this building William Lindsay improved a self-feeder for threshers and separators. Bostrom Corp. bought the building in 1947 and in it developed the "suspension" tractor seat which is still used on most tractors and large trucks. |
| 104 | Lohman Funeral Home and Livery Stable | Lohman Funeral Home and Livery Stable | March 17, 1988 (#88000220) | 804 W. Greenfield and 1325 S. Eighth; 43°01′02″N 87°55′16″W | Home built in 1890 with livery stable added in 1893. In 1918 Archibald Lohman bought both and started a full service funeral home business, which provided hearses, first horse-drawn and later gas-powered. Livery stable being razed as of October 2012. |
| 105 | Robert Machek House | Robert Machek House | October 28, 1977 (#77000038) | 1305 N. 19th St. 43°02′50″N 87°56′12″W | Machek was a Viennese woodcarver who in 1884 was awarded a medal for his work on the royal palace in Belgrade. After immigrating to Milwaukee, he built this house in 1893–94. From a distance its style is Tudor Revival, but up close the woodwork is decorated with Gothic, Renaissance, Baroque and Oriental designs. |
| 106 | Mackie Building | Mackie Building | April 3, 1973 (#73000084) | 225 E. Michigan St. 43°02′14″N 87°54′29″W | 1879 Victorian landmark designed by E. Townsend Mix, once the world’s largest grain exchange, with the original trading pit. |
| 107 | George C. Mansfield Company Building | George C. Mansfield Company Building | July 26, 2016 (#16000476) | 1300 N. 4th St. 43°02′50″N 87°54′57″W | Office and cold storage facility of Mansfield's dairy company, begun in 1908 and expanded between 1919 and 1927. Later bought by Gridley Dairy and Borden. |
| 108 | Marshall & Ilsley Bank | Marshall & Ilsley Bank | November 29, 2021 (#100007170) | 770 North Water St. 43°02′25″N 87°54′33″W | 21-story office building designed by Grassold, Johnson, Wagner & Ilsley in International style and built by Hunzinger Construction in 1968 as headquarters for M&I Bank, founded in Milwaukee in 1847. In the 1970s M&I and other banks developed the TYME machine system; the first cash terminal in the US was installed in the lobby of this building. |
| 109 | Mayer Boot and Shoe Company Building | Mayer Boot and Shoe Company Building | August 2, 1984 (#84003728) | 100 E. Pleasant St. 43°03′10″N 87°54′37″W | 6-story shoe factory begun in 1880 by German immigrant Frederick Mayer, designed by Schnetzky & Co. in Romanesque Revival style. Produced as many as 3,000 pairs of shoes a day. Street renamed and renumbered from 116 E. Walnut St. |
| 110 | McIntosh-Goodrich Mansion | McIntosh-Goodrich Mansion | August 31, 2000 (#00001045) | 1584 N. Prospect Ave. 43°03′02″N 87°53′33″W | 1904 Classical revival-style mansion, designed by architect H.R. Wilson for Charles McIntosh, a leader of J.I. Case and Milwaukee Harvester. Later William and Marie Goodrich lived there, and the Wisconsin Conservatory of Music since the 1930s. |
| 111 | McCullough and Dixon Steam Laundry and Soap Company | McCullough and Dixon Steam Laundry and Soap Company | September 26, 2022 (#100008208) | 419 West Vliet St. 43°02′54″N 87°54′59″W | 2-story brick laundry built in 1888, when commercial laundries were just starting. Washing and coal-fired boilers were in the basement; drying, folding, and ironing were done on the first floor; soap was manufactured on the floors above. |
| 112 | McKinley Boulevard Historic District | McKinley Boulevard Historic District | July 30, 1985 (#85001687) | W. McKinley Blvd. between N. 34th & N. 27th Sts. 43°02′50″N 87°57′08″W | Largely intact neighborhood built in first decade of 1900s, with many houses incorporating German-flavored half-timbering, including the 1901 Rohn house, the 1902 Arts and Crafts-style Brummermann house, the 1902 Tudor Revival Hase house, the 1903 Queen Anne-style Hunholz house, the 1903 Colonial Revival Weld house, the 1903 Neoclassical Graham house, the 1905 Craftsman Leypoldt house, and the 1909 American Foursquare Steuerwald house. |
| 113 | Milwaukee Athletic Club | Milwaukee Athletic Club | March 28, 2019 (#100003549) | 758 N. Broadway; 43°02′25″N 87°54′28″W | 12-story men's club built in 1917, designed by Armand Koch in Neoclassical style. |
| 114 | Milwaukee Breakwater Light | Milwaukee Breakwater Light | September 16, 2011 (#11000678) | South end of the north breakwater, 0.7 miles (1.1 km) east of the mouth of the Milwaukee River; 43°01′37″N 87°52′55″W | Lighthouse on the breakwater, built in 1926 to mark an entry into the harbor. |
| 115 | Milwaukee City Hall | Milwaukee City Hall | March 14, 1973 (#73000085) | 200 E. Wells St. 43°02′31″N 87°54′35″W | Henry C. Koch-designed Flemish Revival building, built 1894–95. Tallest building in US outside of New York City from 1895 to 1901. |
| 116 | Milwaukee County Courthouse | Milwaukee County Courthouse | March 9, 1982 (#82000687) | 901 N. 9th St. 43°02′29″N 87°55′26″W | Massive Classical Revival courthouse designed by Albert Randolph Ross and completed in 1931. |
| 117 | Milwaukee County Dispensary and Emergency Hospital | Milwaukee County Dispensary and Emergency Hospital | March 21, 1985 (#85000639) | 2430 W. Wisconsin Ave. 43°02′22″N 87°56′38″W | Very intact emergency hospital and clinic designed by Van Ryn & DeGelleke in severe Neoclassical style and built in 1927. First full-service, public hospital in Milwaukee that served all, regardless of ability to pay, and site of Dr. Edgar End's research into high-pressure oxygen therapies. |
| 118 | Milwaukee County Historical Center | Milwaukee County Historical Center | March 14, 1973 (#73000086) | 910 N. 3rd St. 43°02′30″N 87°54′52″W | Intact bank building designed by Kirchoff & Rose in Beaux Arts style and built in 1913, currently home to the Milwaukee County Historical Center. |
| 119 | Milwaukee Hospital | Milwaukee Hospital | September 6, 2006 (#06000800) | 2200 W. Kilbourn Ave. 43°02′33″N 87°56′26″W | Lutheran hospital founded in 1863, with surviving buildings as old as 1912 – a leader in antiseptic procedures around 1900 and x-rays in the 1920s. |
| 120 | Milwaukee Jewish Home for the Aged | | October 16, 2024 (#100010931) | 2436 North 50th Street; 43°03′48″N 87°58′34″W | Nursing home for the elderly among Milwaukee's Jewish community. The organization was founded in 1906. This building was added in 1930, a Late Gothic Revival design by architect Charles F. Smith. |
| 121 | Milwaukee Journal Complex | Milwaukee Journal Complex | April 19, 2021 (#100006270) | 333 West State St., 918 Vel R. Phillips Ave. 43°02′34″N 87°54′57″W | Historic sections are the Sentinel's 1918 4-story cast concrete office building and the Journal's 1924 5-story Art Deco pink office building (pictured) designed by Frank Chase, with its frieze depicting the history of communications in 6-foot relief figures carved by Arthur Weary. |
| 122 | Milwaukee News Building and Milwaukee Abstract Association Building | Milwaukee News Building and Milwaukee Abstract Association Building | March 1, 1982 (#82000688) | 222 E. Mason St. 43°02′24″N 87°54′32″W | The Milwaukee News building (right in photo), built 1879, housed the Milwaukee Journal offices from 1885 to 1891. The Abstract Assn. building (left) was built in 1884. Both are clad in cream city brick, with form and styling typical of the period when they were built. |
| 123 | Milwaukee Normal School-Milwaukee Girls' Trade and Technical High School | Milwaukee Normal School-Milwaukee Girls' Trade and Technical High School | January 16, 1986 (#86000123) | 1820 W. Wells St. 43°02′27″N 87°56′09″W | School complex, with its oldest part the 1885 State Normal School, designed in Queen Anne style by E. Townsend Mix. Converted in 1919 to the MPS's Girls technical high school, where girls learned dressmaking, millinery, short-hand, typing and bookkeeping, and Tudor-Gothic wings were added in 1918 and 1932. |
| 124 | Milwaukee Paper Box Company | Milwaukee Paper Box Company | December 18, 2013 (#13000956) | 1560 W. Pierce St. 43°01′29″N 87°55′57″W | 5-story factory built in 1920 for Walter Carlso's company, which made "candy packages of distinctive design." Building designed by Schnetzky & Son. |
| 125 | Milwaukee Pierhead Light | Milwaukee Pierhead Light | November 21, 2012 (#12000971) | Milwaukee Harbor entry N. pier, SE. corner of H.W. Maier Festival Park; 43°01′34″N 87°53′43″W | 42-foot lighthouse built in 1906 on the end of a pier in Milwaukee's harbor. |
| 126 | Milwaukee Protestant Home for the Aged | Milwaukee Protestant Home for the Aged | May 10, 2023 (#100008987) | 2449 North Downer Ave. 43°03′49″N 87°52′43″W | Early nursing home, with its first section designed in French chateau-style by H.C. Koch and built in 1892. It has been expanded many times since, and still serves the elderly. |
| 127 | Milwaukee River Parkway | Milwaukee River Parkway | November 6, 2012 (#12000914) | Between Good Hope Rd. & W. Capitol Dr. 43°07′07″N 87°55′24″W | String of public parks along the Milwaukee River, connected by a road. Conceived in the 1920s by Charles Whitnall, designed by Alfred Boerner, and built with help from work relief programs during the Great Depression. |
| 128 | Milwaukee-Western Fuel Company Building | Milwaukee-Western Fuel Company Building | March 5, 1992 (#92000108) | 2150 N. Prospect Ave. 43°03′29″N 87°53′07″W | Art Deco office building with Art Moderne influence, designed by Herbert Tullgren and built in 1934 for the large coal distributor, with scenes of coal processing in the panels between the windows. |
| 129 | Milwaukee-Downer "Quad" | Milwaukee-Downer "Quad" | January 17, 1974 (#74000106) | NW corner of Hartford and Downer Aves. 43°04′42″N 87°52′43″W | Four buildings of Milwaukee-Downer College, the early women's college, built from 1897 to 1905. Now part of UW-Milwaukee. |
| 130 | Mitchell Building | Mitchell Building | April 3, 1973 (#73000087) | 207 E. Michigan St. 43°02′14″N 87°54′31″W | French Second Empire-style office building, designed by E. Townsend Mix and built for Alexander Mitchell in 1876 to house his bank and insurance company. |
| 131 | Alexander Mitchell House | Alexander Mitchell House | August 28, 2012 (#86003852) | 900 W. Wisconsin Ave. 43°02′23″N 87°55′25″W | Home of Alexander Mitchell, Scottish immigrant, banker, and president of the Chicago, Milwaukee and St. Paul Railroad. Begun by Mitchell in 1848, remodeled in 1859 to then-stylish Italianate style, then remodeled again to Second Empire style in 1876, designed by E. Townsend Mix. Bought by the Deutscher Club, renamed the Wisconsin Club around WWI. |
| 132 | New Coeln House | New Coeln House | February 11, 1988 (#88000083) | 5905 S. Howell Ave. 42°56′14″N 87°54′36″W | 2-story brick Italianate-style village inn, built between 1862 and 1869 in New Coeln, which was then a hamlet of German farmers mostly immigrated from the Rhineland. Probably initially had a tavern and living quarters downstairs and sleeping rooms upstairs. |
| 133 | Newberry Boulevard Historic District | Newberry Boulevard Historic District | March 7, 1994 (#94000137) | 1802–3000 E. Newberry Blvd. 43°04′10″N 87°52′50″W | String of upper-middle-class homes along a landscaped boulevard, including the 1896 Chateauesque-style Goldberg house, the 1900 Elizabethan Revival Wiggenhorn house, the 1908 Arts and Crafts-style Russel house, the 1908 American Foursquare Meisenheimer house, the 1909 Georgian Revival Halsey house, the 1917 Italian Renaissance revival Miller house, the 1917 Maitland bungalow, the 1919 Mediterranean Revival Doepke house, the 1921 Prairie Style Dr. Bours house, the 1925 English-cottage-style Tries house, the 1925 Colonial Revival Zimmermann house, and the 1929 Tudor Revival Harnischfeger house. |
| 134 | North 47th Street Bungalow Historic District | North 47th Street Bungalow Historic District | February 28, 2017 (#100000699) | 2500 block of N. 47th St. between Wright and Clarke Sts. 43°03′55″N 87°58′21″W | Neighborhood of 24 homes built in the 1920s. Many are imaginative bungalows, including the 1923 Craftsman-style Freiburger bungalow, the 1923 frame Conrad bungalow, the 1924 Tudor Revival-flavored Hirt bungalow, and the 1926 Damkoehler bungalow with its clipped gables. Also the 1928 Colonial Revival Olroge house. |
| 135 | North First Street Historic District | North First Street Historic District | August 2, 1984 (#84003731) | Roughly 1st and 2nd Sts. between North and Center Sts. 43°03′47″N 87°54′42″W | Large, varied residential neighborhood, including the 1891 brick Queen Anne-style Miller house, the 1893 frame Queen Anne Stolper house, the 1897 Dutch Colonial Revival Shape house, the 1905 Neogothic English Lutheran Church, the 1912 Craftsman Mausz house, the 1912 Feur bungalow, and the 1913 Colonial Revival-style Masonic Temple. |
| 136 | North Grant Boulevard Historic District | North Grant Boulevard Historic District | March 23, 1995 (#95000290) | 2370–2879 N. Grant Blvd. 43°04′02″N 87°57′57″W | Upscale subdivision built 1913–1931 with large lots and deed restrictions that required single-family homes, large setbacks, and minimum home values. |
| 137 | North Milwaukee High School | | April 20, 2023 (#100008907) | 5372 North 37th St. 43°06′55″N 87°57′31″W | Public school complex, with its first section designed by Van Ryn & DeGelleke and built in 1924 as North Milwaukee High School. Expanded in 1928 and renamed Custer High School. Expanded in 1956 and renamed Thomas Edison Middle School, which operated until 2007. Now being redeveloped as apartments. |
| 138 | North Point Lighthouse | North Point Lighthouse | July 19, 1984 (#84003732) | Wahl St. at Terrace; 43°03′57″N 87°52′13″W | Lighthouse established in 1855, rebuilt in 1888, and raised in 1913 to be visible farther out on Lake Michigan. |
| 139 | North Point North Historic District | North Point North Historic District | March 24, 2000 (#00000255) | Roughly bounded by N. Downer Ave., E. Park Pl., and N. Wahl Ave. 43°03′55″N 87°52′35″W | Upper-middle-class neighborhood on the upper east side on a bluff overlooking Lake Michigan, including the 1895 Queen Anne-style Middleton house, the 1901 Tudor Revival Eschweiler house, the 1906 American Foursquare Dearsley house, the 1912 Prairie Style Stanz house, the 1914 Franzen Craftsman bungalow, the 1915 Arts and Crafts Horter house, the 1924 Mediterranean Revival Moss house, the 1925 Dutch Colonial Revival Locher house, and the 1926 Georgian Revival Bloodgood house. |
| 140 | North Point South Historic District | North Point South Historic District | September 4, 1979 (#79000322) | Roughly bounded by North Ave., Summit, Terrace, and Lafayette Sts. 43°03′26″N 87°52′55″W | 15-block neighborhood on a bluff above Lake Michigan, once part of Milwaukee's "Gold Coast," including the 1861/1902/1915 Paine-Falk house, the 1887 Queen Anne-style Hathaway house, the 1895 Chateauesque Goodrich castle, 1895 High Victorian Gothic Kemper house, the 1896 Colonial Revival Sprague Forsythe house, the 1897 Tudor Revival Gallun house, the 1901 Georgian Revival Fitzgerald-Herzfeld house, the 1902 Arts and Crafts Lane house, the 1905 English Jacobean Uhrig house, the 1907 Elizabethan Revival Ott house, the 1907 Neoclassical Hilda and Gustav Pabst House, and the 1924 Italian Villa-style Smith house. |
| 141 | North Point Water Tower | North Point Water Tower | February 23, 1973 (#73000088) | E. North Ave. between N. Lake Dr. and N. Terrace Ave. 43°03′37″N 87°52′47″W | 175-foot Victorian Gothic tower, used to regulate water pressure, designed by Charles Gombert and built in 1873 as part of Milwaukee's first public waterworks system. |
| 142 | North Sherman Boulevard Historic District | North Sherman Boulevard Historic District | April 6, 2004 (#04000271) | N. Sherman Blvd. Roughly bounded by W. Keefe Ave. and W. Lisbon Ave. 43°04′13″N 87°58′02″W | Neighborhood of stylish homes built starting in 1907 along the parkway connecting Sherman and Washington Parks. |
| 143 | North Third Street Historic District | North Third Street Historic District | August 2, 1984 (#84003733) | Roughly N. 3rd St. between N. 3rd Ave. and Vine St. 43°03′35″N 87°54′52″W | Milwaukee's first business district outside the central downtown, a mile north of that downtown, with surviving examples of many phases of commercial development all the way back to 1854. |
| 144 | Northwestern Branch, National Home for Disabled Volunteer Soldiers Historic District | Northwestern Branch, National Home for Disabled Volunteer Soldiers Historic District | June 3, 2005 (#05000530) | 5000 W. National Ave. 43°01′44″N 87°58′33″W | Cream city brick building in Gothic Revival style designed by E. Townsend Mix in 1867, surrounded by grounds that were one of the first city parks; designated a National Historic Landmark June 17, 2011 |
| 145 | Nunn-Bush Shoe Company Factory | | September 11, 2017 (#100001599) | 2821 N. Vel R. Phillips Ave. 43°04′13″N 87°54′56″W | Factory and headquarters complex of the maker of leather shoes, designed by Herman J. Esser and built in 1916. In 1930 Nunn-Bush was the second largest producer of fine men's shoes in the U.S. |
| 146 | Old St. Mary's Church | Old St. Mary's Church | March 7, 1973 (#73000253) | 844 N. Broadway; 43°02′29″N 87°54′28″W | Milwaukee's first German Catholic church, designed by Victor Schulte in Zopfstil style, which must have been familiar to many of the parish's German immigrants. Completed in 1847. Current exterior looks much as it did after an 1867 remodeling, two years after the Civil War. Now the oldest surviving church in Milwaukee. |
| 147 | Old World Third Street Historic District | Old World Third Street Historic District | March 19, 1987 (#87000494) | N. Old World Third St., W. Highland Ave., and W. State St. 43°02′37″N 87°54′53″W | Relatively intact remnant of the old German retail district west of the Milwaukee River, including the 1858 Italianate-style Bauer building, the 1889 Romanesque Revival Schlitz Brewing Company saloon, the 1906 Neoclassical-style Usinger sausage factory, and the 1953 Neo-Germanic-style Mader's German Restaurant. |
| 148 | Joseph B. Oliver House | Joseph B. Oliver House | January 18, 1990 (#89002312) | 1516 E. Brady St. 43°03′10″N 87°53′29″W | Wood-clad Italianate house designed by Henry C. Koch and built in 1870 for Oliver, a Civil War veteran, grain broker, meat-packing businessman, industrialist, and speculator in real estate and lard. One of the best frame Italianate houses remaining in Milwaukee. |
| 149 | Oneida Street Station | Oneida Street Station | December 6, 1984 (#84000701) | 108 E. Wells and 816 N. Edison Sts. 43°02′28″N 87°54′41″W | Site of pioneering experiments into the use of pulverized coal in boilers from 1918 to 1920. Brick Neoclassical-style building, designed by Herman Esser and built 1900. |
| 150 | Oriental Theatre | Oriental Theatre | February 1, 2023 (#100008594) | 2216–2230 North Farwell Ave. 43°03′35″N 87°53′09″W | 1927 movie palace designed by Dick & Bauer with a Moorish Revival exterior and inside draperies, tile floors, murals, false timbers, and plaster sculptures in Moorish, Indian and Islamic styles, intended to transport visitors to exotic places. |
| 151 | Pabst Brewery Saloon | Pabst Brewery Saloon | January 16, 1986 (#86000125) | 1338–1340 W. Juneau Ave. 43°02′46″N 87°55′48″W | Corner brewery bar built in 1896, designed in Neo-Gothic style by Charles G. Hoffman, with a 3-story square corner tower topped with battlements and lancet windows below. Only this building remains of several bars that Pabst built in this style. |
| 152 | Pabst Brewing Company Complex | Pabst Brewing Company Complex | November 14, 2003 (#03001165) | Roughly bounded by Highland Ave., 11th, Winnebago and 9th Sts. 43°02′45″N 87°55′28″W | Brewing company founded in 1844, and by 1892 the largest brewer of lager in the world. Surviving buildings in the complex include the 1875 Italianate-style 6-story stock/fermenting house, the 1880 main office (complete with battlements to suggest a German castle), the 1889 German Renaissance Revival bottling house, and the 1933 Flemish Renaissance Revival visitor center. |
| 153 | Pabst Theater | Pabst Theater | April 11, 1972 (#72000063) | 144 E. Wells St. 43°02′28″N 87°54′52″W | Technologically innovative theater, financed by Frederick Pabst, designed by Otto Strack in German Renaissance Revival style, and built 1895. At that early date, included a fire curtain, electric lights, and ice-and-fan air conditioning. |
| 154 | Frederick Pabst House | Frederick Pabst House | April 21, 1975 (#75000073) | 2000 W. Wisconsin Ave. 43°02′21″N 87°56′17″W | 1892 Flemish Renaissance Revival mansion of beer baron, Captain Frederick Pabst, designed by George Bowman Ferry. Bought by the Archdiocese in 1908, housing archbishops, priests and sisters. Now a house museum offering public tours. |
| 155 | George W. Peck Row House | George W. Peck Row House | June 14, 2016 (#16000378) | 1620–1630 N. Farwell Ave. 43°03′07″N 87°53′36″W | Upscale Queen Anne-style row house designed by George Bowman Ferry and built in 1883 as an investment property for Peck, the newspaperman, author, and later mayor of Milwaukee and governor of Wisconsin. |
| 156 | Peckham Junior High School | Peckham Junior High School | May 30, 2012 (#12000319) | 3245 N. 37th St. 43°04′42″N 87°57′37″W | Early junior high school designed by Guy Edson Wiley in Collegiate Gothic style and built in 1927, when the junior high was a newish idea for bridging the gap between elementary and high school without extending school beyond 12 years. |
| 157 | Pittsburgh Plate Glass Enamel Plant | Pittsburgh Plate Glass Enamel Plant | October 21, 2009 (#09000851) | 201 E. Pittsburgh Ave. 43°01′44″N 87°54′30″W | Art Moderne-style paint factory, designed by Eschweiler & Eschweiler and built in 1937. |
| 158 | Plankinton-Wells-Water Street Historic District | Plankinton-Wells-Water Street Historic District | June 13, 1986 (#86001328) | Roughly bounded by Wells, Bridge, N. Water, E. Mason, W. Wells, and N. Second Sts. 43°02′26″N 87°54′40″W | Concentration of historic commercial buildings, including the 1870 Italianate-style Nunnemacher building, the 1895 German Renaissance Revival Milwaukee City Hall, the 1897 Queen Anne-style Cawker building, the 1900 Neoclassical-style Pietsch Dye Works, the 1904 Miller Brewing Co. bar, and the 1909 Chicago Commercial-style Manufacturers' Home building. |
| 159 | John Pritzlaff Hardware Company | John Pritzlaff Hardware Company | January 14, 2013 (#12001187) | 305–333 N. Plankinton & 143, 155, W. St. Paul Aves. 43°02′04″N 87°54′43″W | Complex of Italianate-style buildings which housed Milwaukee's largest wholesale hardware company, built from 1875 to 1919. |
| 160 | Prospect Avenue Apartment Buildings Historic District | Prospect Avenue Apartment Buildings Historic District | April 19, 1990 (#90000640) | N. Prospect Ave. area roughly between E. Kane Pl. and E. Windsor St. 43°03′20″N 87°53′17″W | Group of historic apartment buildings on the Lower East Side, including the 1909 Elizabethan Revival-style Cudahy Apartments, the 1911 Neoclassical Wallard Apartments, the 1922 Georgian Revival Ambassador Apartments, the 1924 Mediterranean Revival Shorecrest Hotel, and the 1930 Art Deco Park Lane. |
| 161 | Prospect Avenue Mansions Historic District | Prospect Avenue Mansions Historic District | April 7, 1990 (#90000478) | 1363–1551 N. Prospect Ave. 43°02′56″N 87°53′40″W | Group of stylish mansions on a bluff overlooking Lake Michigan, including the 1876 High Victorian Italianate Collins-Elwell-Cary house, the 1888 Queen Anne Osborne house, the 1901 Elizabethan Revival Black house, the 1902 Mediterranean Revival Kraus house, and the 1907 Neoclassical First Church of Christ Scientist. |
| 162 | Prospect Hill Historic District | Prospect Hill Historic District | March 1, 2005 (#05000104) | 2700 block of N. Hackett Ave., N. Shepard Ave., N. Summit Ave. and 2804-06 E. Park Place; 43°04′05″N 87°52′33″W | Another prestigious neighborhood on the upper east side, on a bluff above Lake Michigan and Lake Park, including the 1894 early Georgian Revival-style Douglass house, the 1895 early Neoclassical Major Sawyer house, the 1895 Dutch Colonial Revival Skinner house, the 1896 Queen Anne-style Laffer house, the 1907 Colonial Revival Koss house, the 1907 Craftsman Adams house, and the 1924 Tudor Revival Mischler house. |
| 163 | Public School No. 27 | Public School No. 27 | August 2, 1984 (#84003735) | 2215 N. Vel R. Phillips Ave. 43°03′34″N 87°54′58″W | Largely intact 3-story school building designed by H.C. Koch and built in 1887, with striking 2-story windows and tiled roof. The round-topped openings are a hallmark of Romanesque Revival style. |
| 164 | Public Service Building | Public Service Building | May 20, 1998 (#98000576) | 231 W. Michigan St. 43°02′14″N 87°54′52″W | Home of the first unified electric power utility in the nation, the Milwaukee Electric Railway and Light Company (now Wisconsin Energy Corporation), founded 1896. The 4-story building was designed by Herman J. Esser in Beaux-Arts style and built 1902–06 as a streetcar terminal, electric plant, public auditorium, and company headquarters. |
| 165 | Pythian Castle Lodge | Pythian Castle Lodge | February 25, 1988 (#88000089) | 1925 W. National Ave. 43°01′21″N 87°56′15″W | 1927 Spanish Colonial Revival-style lodge of Knights of Pythias, designed by Richard Oberst. |
| 166 | Charles Quarles House | Charles Quarles House | July 27, 1979 (#79000096) | 2531 N. Farwell Ave. 43°03′52″N 87°52′55″W | 2.5-story wood-clad Queen Anne-style house with round corner tower, designed by James Douglas and built in 1891–92 for Quarles, a well-regarded constitutional lawyer. Quarles' mother-in-law Louisa Thiers lived in the house until 1926 when she died at age 111, the oldest person in the U.S. |
| 167 | Saint Anthony Hospital | Saint Anthony Hospital | October 6, 2017 (#100001724) | 1004 N. 10th St. 43°02′37″N 87°55′28″W | 5-story brick hospital designed by E. Brielmaier and Sons and built in 1931. |
| 168 | Saint George Melkite Catholic Church | Saint George Melkite Catholic Church | January 16, 1986 (#86000128) | 1617 W. State St. 43°02′35″N 87°56′00″W | Best example of Byzantine Revival-inspired architecture in the city, designed by E. Brielmaier & Sons and built in 1917 for its Syrian-Lebanese community, exemplifying the association between ethnicity and architectural design. |
| 169 | Saint James Court Apartments | Saint James Court Apartments | July 2, 2008 (#08000606) | 831 West Wisconsin Ave. 43°02′18″N 87°55′22″W | 6-story apartment building designed by Alfred C. Clas in Beaux Arts style and built in 1903, aiming for upper middle class renters with its stylish facade and conveniences like built-in china cabinets, maid's rooms, and an elevator. |
| 170 | St. James Episcopal Church | St. James Episcopal Church | June 27, 1979 (#79000098) | 833 W. Wisconsin Ave. 43°02′17″N 87°55′22″W | English Gothic Revival-style Episcopal church, limestone-clad with a large square corner tower, designed by Gordon W. Lloyd and built 1867–68. |
| 171 | St. John's Evangelical Lutheran Church Complex | St. John's Evangelical Lutheran Church Complex | May 1, 1992 (#92000459) | 804–816 W. Vliet St. 43°02′55″N 87°55′19″W | 1889 Gothic Revival church designed by Herman Schnetzky for the German-American congregation. Complex includes 1889 Queen Anne-style parsonage and 1914 caretaker's bungalow. |
| 172 | St. John's Roman Catholic Cathedral | St. John's Roman Catholic Cathedral | December 31, 1974 (#74000108) | 812 N. Jackson St. 43°02′30″N 87°54′14″W | Zopfstil-style cathedral, designed by Victor Schulte and built 1847-1852. The top of the tower is an 1893 redesign by Ferry & Clas. |
| 173 | St. Josaphat Basilica | St. Josaphat Basilica | March 7, 1973 (#73000089) | 601 W. Lincoln Ave. 43°00′09″N 87°55′09″W | Grand 1901 church designed by Erhard Brielmaier, inspired by St. Peter's Basilica in Rome. Named the third basilica in the US in 1929. |
| 174 | St. Martini Evangelical Lutheran Church | St. Martini Evangelical Lutheran Church | September 25, 1987 (#87001741) | 1557 W. Orchard St. 43°00′57″N 87°55′57″W | Gothic Revival-style church designed by Herman Schnetzky and built in 1887, with gold pinnacles on the towers. |
| 175 | St. Matthew Christian Methodist Episcopal Church | St. Matthew Christian Methodist Episcopal Church | May 8, 2019 (#100003909) | 2944 N. 9th St. 43°04′20″N 87°55′21″W | Headquarters of MUSIC (Milwaukee United School Integration Committee) and site of freedom schools during Milwaukee's civil rights movement from 1964 to '67 under Pastor B.S. Gregg. Before that, the Collegiate Gothic church was built in 1915. |
| 176 | St. Patrick's Roman Catholic Church | St. Patrick's Roman Catholic Church | December 16, 1974 (#74000109) | 1105 S. 7th St. 43°01′12″N 87°55′13″W | Gothic Revival-style church designed by James J. Egan and built from 1893 to 1895. |
| 177 | St. Paul's Episcopal Church | St. Paul's Episcopal Church | December 27, 1974 (#74000110) | 904 E. Knapp St. 43°02′50″N 87°54′02″W | Romanesque Revival style church noted for its Tiffany windows, built 1882–90 by local architect E. Townsend Mix adapting a design by Henry Hobson Richardson. |
| 178 | Saint Peter's Evangelical Lutheran Church | Saint Peter's Evangelical Lutheran Church | September 25, 1987 (#87001736) | 1204, 1213, 1214, and 1215 S. Eighth St. 43°01′08″N 87°55′16″W | Designed by Andrew Elleson in Victorian Gothic Revival style and completed in 1885. |
| 179 | Saint Vincent's Infant Asylum | Saint Vincent's Infant Asylum | September 25, 1987 (#87001742) | 809 W. Greenfield Ave. 43°01′01″N 87°55′16″W | Catholic institution to nurture unwanted infants and unwed mothers, with the 1878 section designed by Charles Gombert and the 1890 section by E. Townsend Mix. |
| 180 | Saints Peter and Paul Roman Catholic Church Complex | Saints Peter and Paul Roman Catholic Church Complex | September 13, 1991 (#91001392) | 2474 and 2490 N. Cramer St. and 2479 and 2491 N. Murray Ave. 43°03′48″N 87°53′10″W | Later parish of German immigrants, with Romanesque Revival church built in 1890–92 (Henry Messmer), Neoclassical rectory (originally a school) built in 1890 (Messmer), Romanesque Revival convent built in 1889 (Herman Schnetzky), and Romanesque Revival school built in 1912 (Erhard Brielmaier). |
| 181 | Salem Evangelical Church | Salem Evangelical Church | October 1, 1987 (#87001760) | 1025 & 1037 S. Eleventh St. 43°01′13″N 87°55′32″W | Modest Victorian Gothic-style church built in 1874 for the German congregation. Now houses St. Michael's Ukrainian Roman Catholic Church. (Still ethnic after all these years.) |
| 182 | Joseph Schlitz Brewing Company Saloon | Joseph Schlitz Brewing Company Saloon | April 11, 1977 (#77000040) | 2414 S. St. Clair St. 43°00′01″N 87°53′35″W | Queen Anne-style corner bar designed by Charles Kirchhoff Jr. and built by Schlitz in 1897, then leased until 1920, when antitrust law forced Schlitz to divest ownership of its bars. The belted globe on the turret is a Schlitz trademark, and very few like it remain. |
| 183 | Joseph Schlitz Company Brewery Complex | Joseph Schlitz Company Brewery Complex | December 30, 1999 (#99001632) | 219 W. Galena St. 43°03′03″N 87°54′46″W | Schlitz brewery complex, including the 1886 German Renaissance Revival-style Stock and Malt house, the 1886/1910/1936 Office/Brown Bottle Pub, the 1890 Romanesque Revival-style Brew House, the 1899 Bottle House A, and six other industrial buildings. |
| 184 | Victor Schlitz House | Victor Schlitz House | January 16, 1986 (#86000145) | 2004 W. Highland Ave. 43°02′41″N 87°56′16″W | Fine Queen Anne-style house with various turrets and textures, designed by Charles Gombert and built in 1890 for Schlitz, a German immigrant who became a wealthy liquor and wine distributor. |
| 185 | Schoonmaker Reef | Schoonmaker Reef | September 25, 1997 (#97001266) | North of West St., between N. 66th St. and N. 64th St. extended 43°02′50″N 87°59′37″W | Fossil coral reef, formed in the Silurian period when Wisconsin lay beneath a shallow tropical sea. While it was quarried for lime starting in the 1830s, many fossils of extinct organisms like trilobites were found in its dolomite. In 1862 this formation and similar ones nearby were recognized to be fossilized reefs - the first recognized in North America, and among the first in the world. |
| 186 | Schramka Funeral Home | | February 2, 2023 (#100008601) | 608–612 East Burleigh St. 43°04′29″N 87°54′13″W | Tudor Revival-style structure designed by Roland Kurtz and built in 1929 as a funeral home for its working class Polish-Catholic neighborhood. The first floor held the business and the Schramka family lived above. Three generations of the family ran the business for 72 years. |
| 187 | George Schuster House | George Schuster House | January 16, 1986 (#86000137) | 3209 W. Wells St. 43°02′25″N 87°57′16″W | Eclectic-style 1891 red brick and sandstone home with bays and tower, Flemish gables, and a bartizan, with 1891 carriage barn. Designed by Crane & Barkhausen for tobacco merchant Schuster. |
| 188 | Second Church of Christ Scientist | Second Church of Christ Scientist | January 16, 1986 (#86000139) | 2722 W. Highland Blvd. 43°02′43″N 87°56′54″W | Christian Science church inspired by the Pantheon in Rome, designed by Carl Barkhausen and built in 1913. |
| 189 | Sheridan Apartment Building | | December 14, 2020 (#100005903) | 2435 West Wisconsin Ave. 43°02′19″N 87°56′38″W | 6-story apartment designed by Backes & Uthus and built in 1927. The style is Mediterranean Revival, with a brown brick exterior with terra cotta ornament. |
| 190 | Shorecrest Hotel | Shorecrest Hotel | September 7, 1984 (#84003737) | 1962 N. Prospect Ave. 43°03′20″N 87°53′15″W | 9-story luxury apartment building, Moroccan/Art Deco-style with brick trimmed in terra cotta and copper, designed by Herbert Tullgren, built in 1924, and expanded in 1929. |
| 191 | Fred Sivyer House | Fred Sivyer House | January 16, 1986 (#86000141) | 761 N. 25th St. 43°02′24″N 87°56′42″W | Fine 2-story frame Queen Anne house with many textures and gables, built in 1888, and little changed since. Built for Sivyer, founder of Northwestern Malleable Iron Co. and Milwaukee's first trades school. |
| 192 | Sixth Church of Christ, Scientist | Sixth Church of Christ, Scientist | March 27, 1980 (#80000168) | 1036 N. Van Buren St. 43°02′42″N 87°54′17″W | 1902 Christian Science church designed by Elmer Grey in a fresh combination of Gothic Revival and Romanesque Revival styles. |
| 193 | A.O. Smith Corporation Headquarters | | October 11, 2022 (#100008256) | 3025 West Hopkins St. and 3533 North 27th St. 43°05′00″N 87°56′51″W | Original 1910 headquarters, 1931 Research and Engineering building, and the world's first automated assembly plant, where auto frames were made. A. O. Smith also designed bomb casings, propellers, and components for the atom bomb during WWII. |
| 194 | Lloyd R. Smith House | Lloyd R. Smith House | December 30, 1974 (#74000107) | 2220 N. Terrace Ave. 43°03′28″N 87°52′51″W | 1924 Italian villa-style home overlooking Lake Michigan, with landscaped gardens spilling down the bluff. Now Villa Terrace Decorative Arts Museum. |
| 195 | Soldiers' Home Reef | Soldiers' Home Reef | November 4, 1993 (#93001617) | Northeast of the junction of Wood Ave. and General Mitchell Blvd., Clement J. Zablocki Veterans Affairs Medical Center grounds 43°01′40″N 87°58′29″W | Another fossilized coral reef, much like Schoonmaker. They were the first formations in North America identified as fossil coral reefs, by James Hall in 1862. Unlike Schoonmaker, this reef remains very much as when Lapham and Hall studied it in the 1800s. |
| 196 | South Branch Library | South Branch Library | February 11, 1988 (#88000084) | 931 W. Madison St. 43°01′04″N 87°55′25″W | Neoclassical-style library with an unusual semi-circular stack room, designed by Brust and Philipp and built 1908-10 - the first purpose-built branch library in Milwaukee, with a particular aim to serve the south side's immigrants with materials in German and Polish. |
| 197 | South First and Second Street Historic District | South First and Second Street Historic District | November 30, 1987 (#87002092) | Roughly bounded by Menomonee River, Chicago & N. Western RR, Seeboth, S. First, Oregon, & S. Second Sts. 43°01′49″N 87°54′43″W | Group of 28 commercial and industrial buildings near the confluence of the Milwaukee and Menomonee Rivers, including the ca 1858 Greek Revival-style Borger tavern, the 1864 Romanesque Revival Burnham warehouse, the 1865 Italianate Stamm building, the 1872 Victorian Gothic-influenced Michel warehouse, the 1873 Queen Anne-style Seidel tavern, and the 1892 Romanesque Revival Milwaukee Cold Storage, and Lindsay Ag Implement warehouse. |
| 198 | South Layton Boulevard Historic District | South Layton Boulevard Historic District | April 24, 1996 (#96000412) | 921–2264 S. Layton Blvd. 43°00′48″N 87°56′54″W | Large residential neighborhood strung along Layton Blvd, including the 1892 Queen Anne-style Kretschmar house, the 1902 Neoclassical Dr. Stack house, the 1907 Arts and Crafts Baumann house, the 1908 American Foursquare Schuerman house, the 1909 Colonial Revival Kroening house, the 1911 Filipowicz bungalow, the 1912 Craftsman Nimmer house, the 1914 Romanesque Revival St. Joseph's Convent Chapel, the 1915 Prairie School Huschek house, the 1927 Mediterranean Revival Huber house, and the 1927 Tudor Revival Dr. Bernhard house. |
| 199 | Spencerian Business College | Spencerian Business College | March 14, 2008 (#07001331) | 2800 W Wright St. 43°03′52″N 87°56′56″W | Housed Miss Ethelyn Bennet's distinguished business training institution from 1923 to 1965, where the school pioneered work-study programs and the trimester calendar. The Georgian Revival building was designed by Alexander Eschweiler and built in 1911 to be the Kilbourn Exchange of the Wisconsin Telephone Company. |
| 200 | Spring Grove Site | Spring Grove Site | September 10, 1979 (#79000097) | Address Restricted | |
| 201 | Square D Company-Industrial Controller Division | Square D Company-Industrial Controller Division | October 22, 2014 (#14000878) | 710 S. 3rd St. 43°01′26″N 87°54′50″W | 1913 factory designed by Frank L. Bader for Riverside Printing Company. Bought by Industrial Controller/Square D in 1925, and used for manufacturing controls for industrial motors, resistance welders, steel mills, and other devices. |
| 202 | State Bank of Wisconsin | State Bank of Wisconsin | March 8, 1984 (#84003742) | 210 E. Michigan St. 43°02′15″N 87°54′30″W | 6-story Neoclassical-style office building begun as two banks in 1856 and 1858, then joined in 1903. |
| 203 | William Steinmeyer House | William Steinmeyer House | October 11, 1984 (#84000102) | 1716–1722 N. 5th St. 43°03′11″N 87°55′01″W | 2.5-story Queen Anne 4-plex with bays and shingled gable ends, designed by C.R. Ringer and built in 1895. Steinmeyer was a wholesale grocer with a warehouse behind the apartments. |
| 204 | TOPS Club Inc | | September 26, 2022 (#100008211) | 4575 South 5th St. 42°57′39″N 87°55′02″W | 1965 building designed by Baudhuin & Associates, Engineers to hold headquarters, publishing, printing and warehouse facilities of the international TOPS Club, which sponsors research and supports people in weight control. |
| 205 | Trinity Evangelical Lutheran Church | Trinity Evangelical Lutheran Church | May 8, 1979 (#79000099) | 1046 N. 9th St. 43°02′39″N 87°55′21″W | 1878 German Romanesque/Gothic Revival-style church designed by Frederick Velguth. Now the oldest Missouri Synod church in Milwaukee. |
| 206 | Tripoli Temple | Tripoli Temple | January 16, 1986 (#86000142) | 3000 W. Wisconsin Ave. 43°02′21″N 87°57′05″W | Moorish Revival-style Shrine Center, with massing based on the Taj Mahal, designed by Clas and Shepard and built in 1928. One of the best examples of this architectural style in the U.S. |
| 207 | Turner Hall | Turner Hall | November 7, 1977 (#77000041) | 1034 N. 4th St. 43°02′37″N 87°54′56″W | Henry C. Koch-designed 1882 meeting place of German-American social, political and gymnastic organization, the Turners. |
| 208 | Underwriters Exchange Building | Underwriters Exchange Building | May 10, 2023 (#100008986) | 828 North Broadway; 43°02′30″N 87°54′29″W | 9-story office building designed by Rosman & Wierdsma with Gothic Revival styling and built in 1924 to house more than forty insurance offices. This was part of a trend of the 1910s and 20s, with similar exchanges built in Chicago, San Francisco, and Boston. |
| 209 | Harry B. Walker House | Harry B. Walker House | January 16, 1986 (#86000144) | 3130 W. Wells St. 43°02′26″N 87°57′14″W | Picturesque Victorian Gothic-style house designed by James Douglas and built ca. 1878, with 2-story bays and deep, flared eaves. Exterior is little changed since 1878. |
| 210 | Walker's Point Historic District | Walker's Point Historic District | December 19, 1978 (#78000120) | Roughly bounded by the Freeway, Scott, 2nd, and W. Virginia Street; 43°01′27″N 87°55′00″W | Old working-class neighborhood that developed in the area where George Walker initially settled, it is the only part of 19th century Milwaukee to survive largely intact, with buildings ranging from the 1849 Zopfstil Holy Trinity Catholic Church, to the 1854 Greek Revival Howard house, to remnants of the Pfister and Vogel Leather Company complex, to the 1901 Neoclassical Tivoli Palm beer garden/dance hall. |
| 211 | Ward Memorial Hall | Ward Memorial Hall | September 6, 1984 (#84003748) | 5000 W. National Ave. 43°01′32″N 87°58′35″W | Gothic/Romanesque-style theater at the Milwaukee Soldiers Home, designed by H.C. Koch and built in 1881–82. Now one of the oldest theaters in Wisconsin. |
| 212 | West Center-North 32nd Industrial Historic District | | March 23, 2020 (#100005095) | 2727, 2748, 2769 & 2784 North 32nd St.; 2758 North 33rd St.; and 3212 West Center St. 43°04′05″N 87°57′14″W | Factories eventually acquired by Briggs & Stratton and merged into its West plant, consisting of the 1900 Milwaukee Reliance Boiler Works, the 1906 Eschweiler-designed Romadka Brothers trunk factory, the 1920 Westinghouse Lamp building, the 1920 Columbia Knitting and Manufacturing Co., the 1925 A.H. Weinbrenner Shoe factory, the 1929 Ideal Shoe factory, and the 1950 Briggs & Stratton factory. |
| 213 | West Mitchell Street Commercial Historic District | | November 9, 2018 (#100003103) | Generally bounded by W Forest Home Ave., S 13th, W Historic Mitchell & S 5th Sts. 43°00′44″N 87°55′31″W | Business district on the South Side, once called "the Polish Grand Avenue." Includes the 1872 Romanesque Revival St. Stanislaus Church, the 1888 Queen Anne-style Noe meat market, the 1889 Boomtown-style Kubal Grocery & Saloon, the 1896 Chateauesque St. Anthony's rectory, the 1897 Neoclassical-style Czerwinski real estate office, the 1898 German Renaissance Revival Kalczynski dry goods store, the 1914 20th Century Commercial Schuster's Department Store, the 1924 Neoclassical-style Modjeska Theater, and the 1937 Art Deco-style Grand Department Store. |
| 214 | West Side Commercial Historic District | West Side Commercial Historic District | December 22, 2000 (#78003462) | Roughly, W. Wisconsin Ave., N. Third St., N. Plankinton Ave, and N. 2nd St. 43°02′18″N 87°54′49″W | Part of the central business district along W. Wisconsin, including the 1891–92 Romanesque Revival Matthews Brothers building, the 1895–1920 Commercial-style Plankinton/Boston Store, the 1901 Commercial-style Gimbels Dept. Store, the 1907/1913 Caswell office building, the 1907 Beaux-Arts Majestic office towers, the 1913 German Renaissance Revival Hotel Wisconsin, the 1916 Neoclassical Plankinton Arcade, the 1927 Mediterranean Revival Empire Building/Riverside Theater, the 1930 Art Deco Kresge building, and the 1930 Moderne-style Warner building. |
| 215 | West St. Paul Avenue Industrial Historic District | West St. Paul Avenue Industrial Historic District | March 12, 2018 (#100002198) | Generally bounded by the N & S sides of & 1101–2045 W. St. Paul Ave. including 272 to 405 N 12th & 324–422 N 15th Sts. 43°02′05″N 87°55′52″W | Grouping of 22 properties, including the 1889 Queen Anne-style Kunz Schlitz Brewery Tavern, the 1893/1919 Cutler-Hammer Factory and Machine Shop, the 1901 Milwaukee Casket Company, the 1902 Geuder, Paeschke, and Frey Manufacturing Co., the 1913 Milwaukee Brewers Specialty Co., the 1929 20th Century Commercial-style NESCO office building, and the 1951 Cutler-Hammer Motor Switch Plant. |
| 216 | West Washington-North Hi-Mount Boulevards Historic District | West Washington-North Hi-Mount Boulevards Historic District | May 18, 1994 (#94000422) | 4701–5929 W. Washington Blvd.; 1720–2049 N. Hi-Mount Blvd. 43°03′12″N 87°58′49″W | Historic neighborhood of stylish homes built along the named boulevards beginning in 1912, mostly for businessmen and professionals. In Milwaukee, "boulevard" generally meant a broad street with a landscaped median, connecting two parks. |
| 217 | Wisconsin Consistory Building | Wisconsin Consistory Building | September 26, 1994 (#94001158) | 790 N. Van Buren St. 43°02′29″N 87°54′08″W | Originally built in 1889 as a Romanesque-style Congregational church, the building was later bought by a Masonic order and remodeled in 1937 to Art Moderne style. |
| 218 | Wisconsin Leather Company Building | Wisconsin Leather Company Building | March 30, 2005 (#05000250) | 320 E. Clybourn St. 43°02′18″N 87°54′24″W | Designed and built in 1874 by E. Townsend Mix. Served as the central office and store for one of the first leather companies established in Milwaukee, and by the 1870s, one of the largest. |
| 219 | Woman's Club of Wisconsin | Woman's Club of Wisconsin | October 4, 1982 (#82001847) | 813 E. Kilbourn Ave. 43°02′33″N 87°54′05″W | The oldest woman's clubhouse in the United States, designed by George Bowman Ferry and built in 1887 for the Athenaeum, the first known stock company formed by women in the U.S. |

== Former listings ==
| | Name on the Register | Image | Date listed | Date removed | Location | City or town | Description |
|---|---|---|---|---|---|---|---|
| 1 | Milwaukee Fire Department High Pressure Pumping Station | Milwaukee Fire Department High Pressure Pumping Station | July 7, 1981 (#81000049) | December 18, 2024 | 2011 S. 1st St. 43°00′21″N 87°54′41″W | Milwaukee | Unusual pumping station built in 1931 to provide immediate high pressure to help put out fires in its industrial neighborhood without waiting for a pumper truck. |
| 2 | Old Coast Guard Station | Old Coast Guard Station | August 7, 1989 (#89001047) | July 1, 2009 | 1600 North Lincoln Memorial Drive; 43°03′04″N 87°53′15″W | Milwaukee | 3-story building with 4-story tower, designed by Victor Mendleheff in Prairie Style and built in 1915. |

== See also ==
- National Register of Historic Places listings in Milwaukee County, Wisconsin
- List of National Historic Landmarks in Wisconsin
- National Register of Historic Places listings in Wisconsin
