= St. George the Martyr's Church =

There are various churches dedicated to Saint George the Martyr

- St. George Coptic Orthodox Church (Philadelphia)
- St George the Martyr Holborn
- St George the Martyr Southwark
- St. George Melkite Catholic Church
- St. George Church
- St. George the Great Martyr Orthodox Church, Alaska

== See also ==
- St. George Episcopal Church
