= Hilda and Gustav Pabst House =

German Renaissance Revival style home

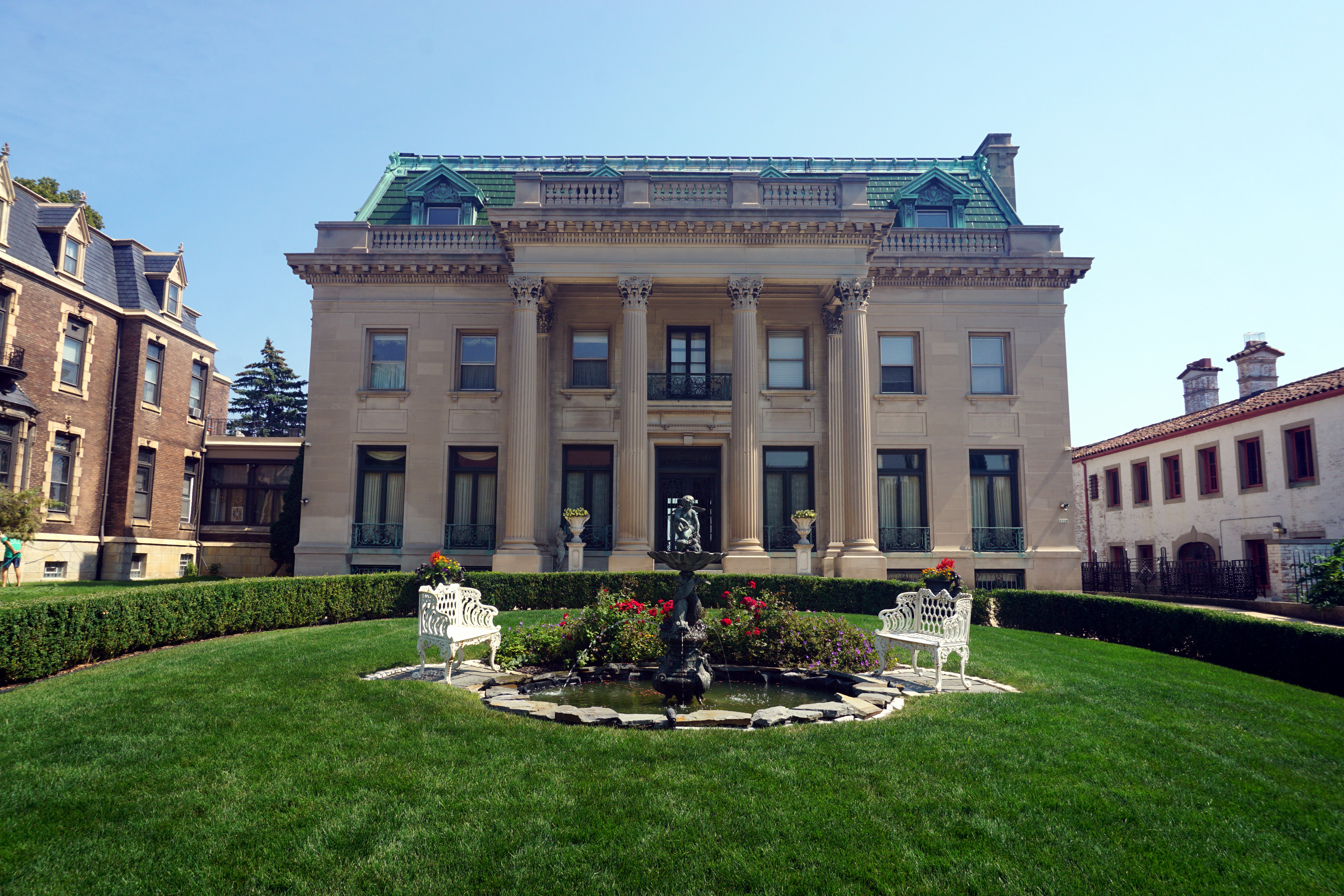
- Hilda and Gustav Pabst House
- Interactive map of Hilda and Gustav Pabst House
- 43.05785°N 87.88066°W
- Location: 2230 N Terrace Ave, Milwaukee, WI 53202
- Nearest city: Milwaukee, Wisconsin

History
- Built: 1906-1907
- Built for: Wisconsin industrialist John Kern
- Original use: Home

Site notes
- Area: 5,686 square feet
- Architect(s): Ferry & Clas
- Architectural style: Neoclassical
- Governing body: Wisconsin Historical Society
- Owner: James F. Holton, Suzanne Holton

The Hilda and Gustav Pabst House is a Neoclassical mansion completed in 1907. The home was built for real estate developer and heir to the Pabst Brewing Company Gustav Pabst. The home is located in Milwaukee, Wisconsin in the North Point South Historic District. The home was completed in 1907, and was listed in the Wisconsin state register January 1, 1989 and added to the National Register September 4, 1979 as part of the North Point South Historic District.

== History ==
The Neoclassic mansion was built by Gustav Pabst 1906-07 for $70,000. In 2021 dollars the home would be $2,037,201.06.

== Architectural elements ==
The home features carved limestone and hammered copper detailing. The four pillars that adorn the entryway were carved from a single block of stone.

== See also ==
- National Register of Historic Places listings in Milwaukee, Wisconsin
