= George Schuster House =

Historic mansion in Wisconsin

- U.S. National Register of Historic Places
- The Wells Street Red Castle
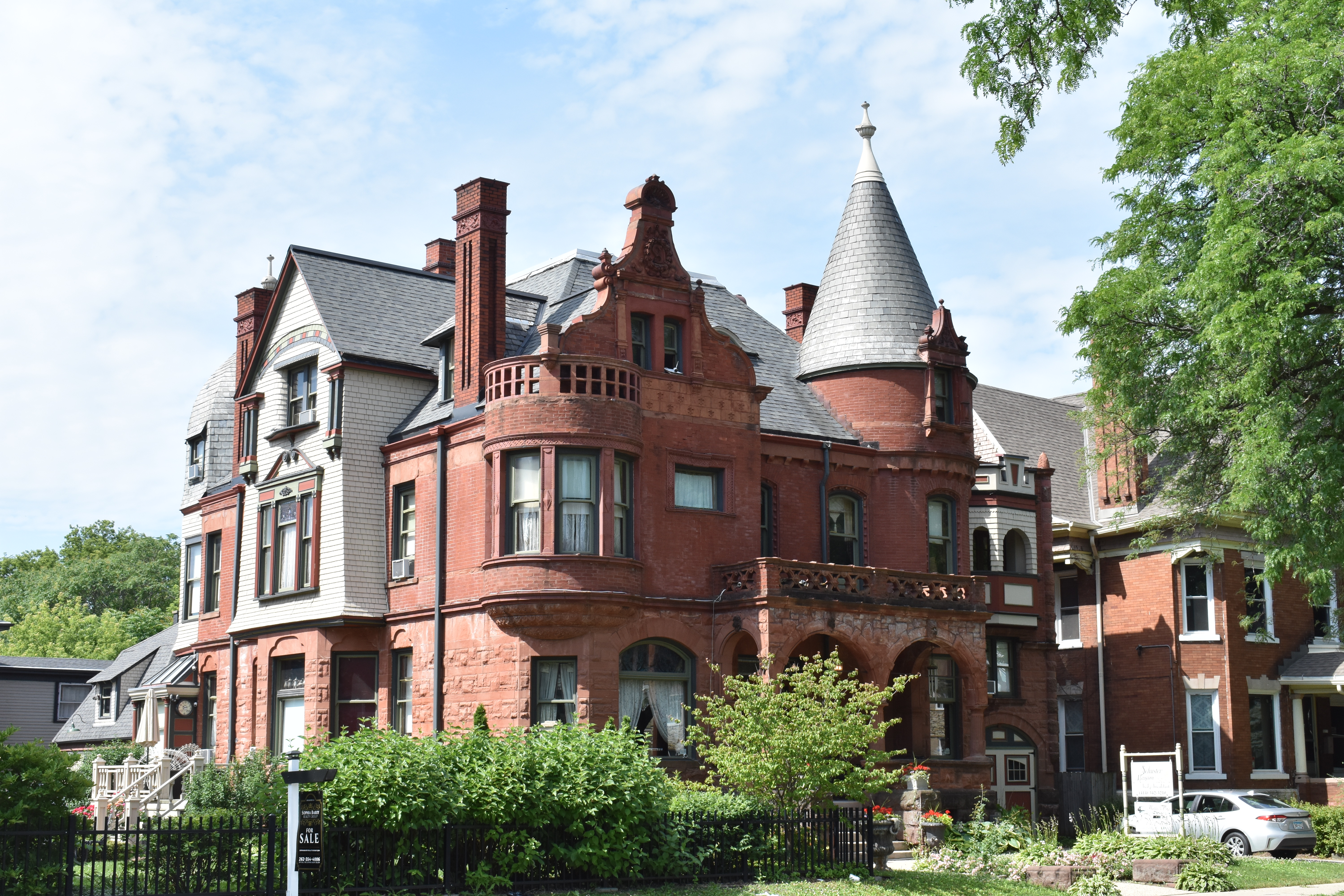
- George Schuster House

- Location within Wisconsin Location within the United States
- Location: 3209 W. Wells St.
- Coordinates: 43.04°N 87.954444°W
- Built: 1891
- Architect: Crane and Barkhausen
- Architectural style: German Renaissance Revival
- Website: schustermansion.com
- NRHP reference No.: 86000137
- Added to NRHP: January 1, 1989

George Schuster House (1891) also known as The Wells Street Red Castle, is located in Milwaukee, Wisconsin. The German Renaissance Revival mansion was built for tobacco magnate George Schuster. It is listed on the neighborhood, city, national and state Register of Historic Places. It was added to the National Register of Historic Places listings in Milwaukee (NRHP) in 1986.

== History ==
In 1891 the 9,300 sq ft (860 m^{2}) brick mansion was commissioned by tobacco magnate George Schuster. He purchased land for his home in August 1891. In September 1891, he was issued a construction permit. The home has 8 bedrooms and 3.5 baths was designed by Crane and Barkhausen. The architects also designed a Coach-house and it was built at the same time. Schuster died in 1922 and in by 1923 the home was vacant. In 1924 it was sold to Jean B. Olinger, who divided the home into 6 apartments.

People began calling the home the Redstone Apartments. By 1982 there were two more apartments added and it became an 8 family. By 2008 it was a bed and breakfast with seven units. People also began calling the home The Wells Street Red Castle because of the red brick.

The home was listed on the neighborhood, city, national and state Register of Historic Places. It was listed on the Wisconsin State Register January 16, 1986 and on the National Register of Historic Places listings in Milwaukee January 1, 1989.

== Description ==
The home was constructed with red sandstone, red brick and red Terracotta. The building took on the appearance of a European castle with other influences, including: Gothic Revival architecture, Châteauesque, Romanesque architecture, German Renaissance Revival and some Colonial Revival architecture. The home features two towers and a facade of fleur-de-lis to Trefoils, rondels, Pilasters and lions’ heads. The home is full of difficult angles and transitions along with detailed layers. The home has hardwood floors, high ceilings and wood throughout with a formal dining room and a library.
