= Kilbourn Masonic Temple =

- U.S. National Register of Historic Places
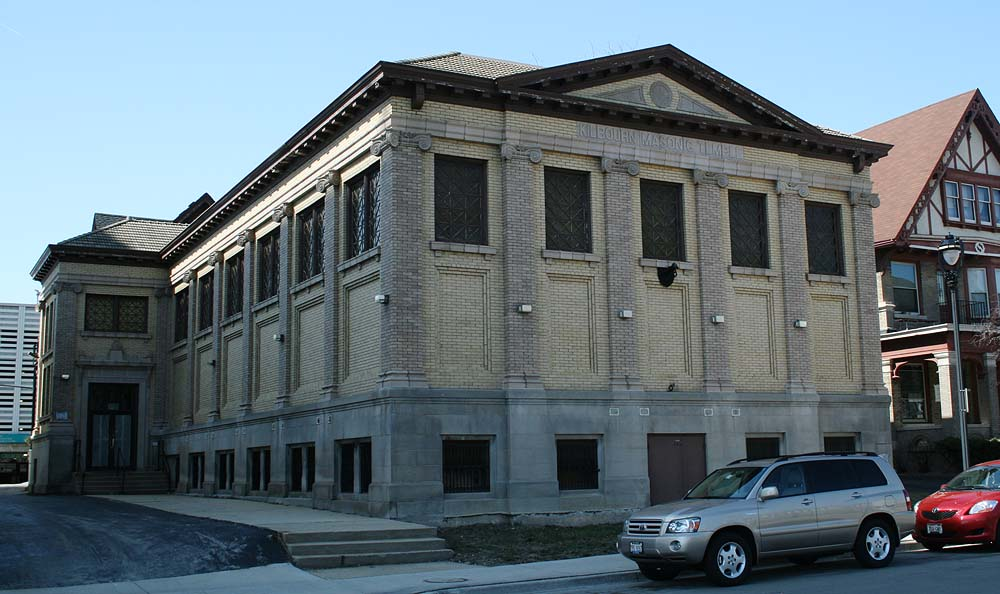
- Kilbourn Masonic Temple, Milwaukee, Wisconsin

- Location within Wisconsin Location within the United States
- Location: 827 N. Eleventh St., Milwaukee, Wisconsin
- Coordinates: 43°2′26″N 87°55′35″W
- Area: less than one acre
- Built: 1911
- Built by: C.A. Kleppe
- Architect: H. Paul Schnetzky & Son
- Architectural style: Classical Revival
- MPS: West Side Area MRA
- NRHP reference No.: 86000121
- Added to NRHP: January 16, 1986

The Kilbourn Masonic Temple (Touse) is a historic Masonic building located in Milwaukee, Wisconsin. It was constructed in 1911 as a meeting hall for Kilbourn Lodge #3, a local Masonic lodge which was one of the first three organized in Wisconsin in 1843. The Masons no longer meet in the building). It was listed on the National Register of Historic Places in 1986. When it celebrated its 100th anniversary in 2011, the temple was automatically deemed a landmark in the city of Milwaukee. The building formerly served as a chapter house for Marquette University's Kappa Sigma fraternity, and later for Sigma Phi Epsilon. It is currently home to the university's Delta Tau Delta chapter.

The building was originally a residence but it was remodeled by the masons with a Classical Revival facade which completely enclosed the former house. The renovation was designed by architect H. Paul Schnetzky and Son in 1911.
