= Abraham H. Esbenshade House =

Historic house in Wisconsin, United States

- U.S. National Register of Historic Places
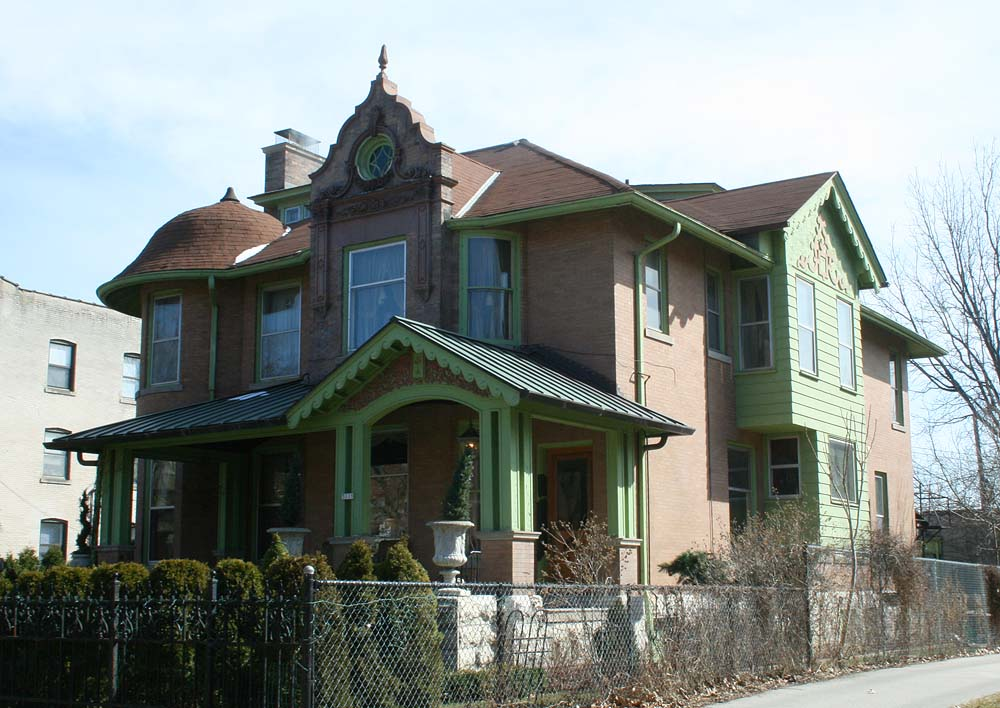
- Abraham H. Esbenshade House

- Location within Wisconsin Location within the United States
- Location: 3119 W. Wells St. Milwaukee, Wisconsin
- Coordinates: 43.04004°N 87.95375°W
- Built: 1899
- Architect: Charles D. Crane/Carl C. Barkhausen
- Architectural style: Queen Anne
- NRHP reference No.: 86000106
- Added to NRHP: January 16, 1986

The Abraham H. Esbenshade House is a late Queen Anne-style house built in 1899 in Milwaukee, Wisconsin, United States. It was added to the National Register of Historic Places in 1986.

== History ==
Abraham Esbenshade was secretary-treasurer of the F. Westphal Co., a manufacturer of files. He and his wife Alice had the Milwaukee architects Crane & Barkhausen design this new home for them and it was built in 1899.

The house is two stories with a hip roof, and a generally squarish footprint. Its asymmetry, its corner turret, and its variety of textures (brick, limestone and stucco) are typical of Queen Anne style, but other details are unlike any standard Queen Anne design. The parapeted gable rising in the center front is a Flemish Renaissance feature. The flat bell-shaped roof on the turret is unusual - perhaps eastern European. The scroll-sawed bargeboards could be a throw-back to Gothic Revival style. The decoration in some gable ends match the Flemish gable more than the fish-scale shingles typical of Queen Anne.

It is located at 3119 West Wells Street, in the historic Concordia district of Milwaukee.
