= North Point South Historic District =

Historic Neighborhood in Milwaukee Wisconsin

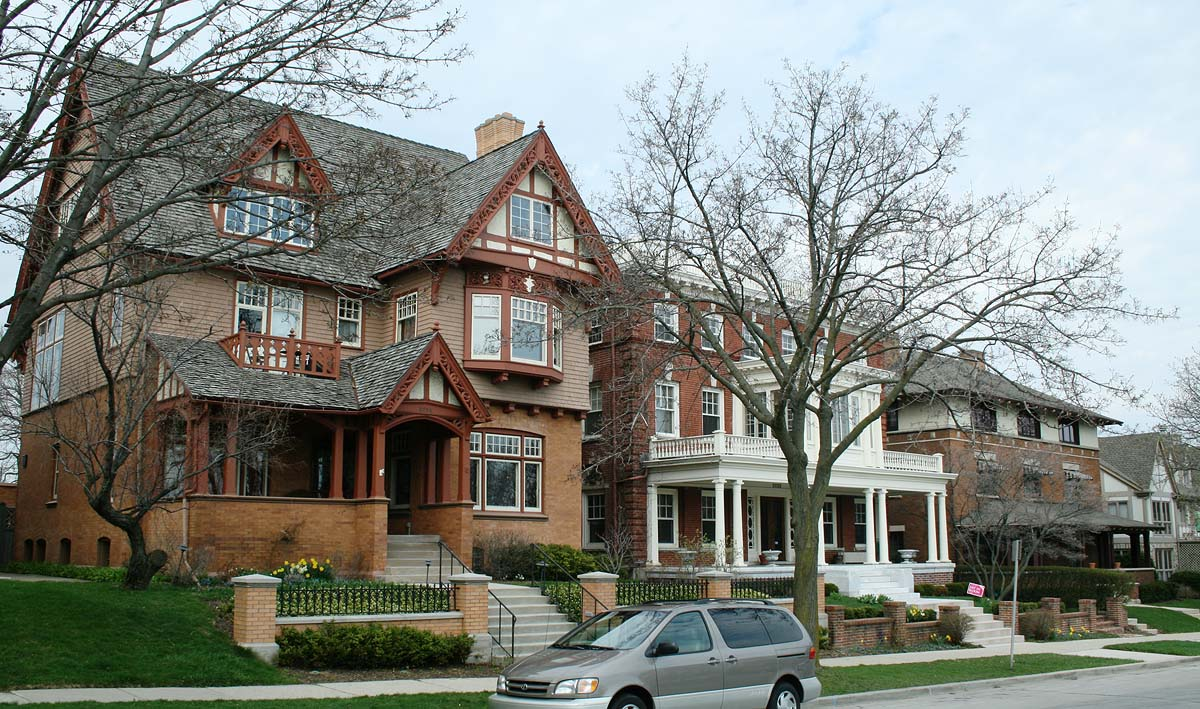
A Mansion on Lafayette within the North Point South Historic District

North Point South Historic District is a 100-acre (40 ha) neighborhood atop a bluff overlooking Lake Michigan. It was listed on the (NRHP) National Register of Historic Places listings in Milwaukee on September 4, 1979.

== History ==
In 1854, Jefferson Glidden and John Lockwood purchased 100 acres 80 ft (24 m) Lake Michigan. The “north point” is now called the "North Point Historic District". There is bulge in Lake Michigan’s coast that combined with "south point," creates Milwaukee's harbor.

The district was added to the National of Historic Places September 4, 1979 and was added to the State Register of Historic Places January 1, 1989: reference Number:79000322.

== Description ==
The district is in Milwaukee Wisconsin overlooking Lake Michigan. It stretches from East North Avenue, East Lafayette Place, North Terrace Avenue and North Summit Avenue.
