= Second Church of Christ, Scientist (Milwaukee) =

Historic church in Wisconsin, United States

- U.S. National Register of Historic Places
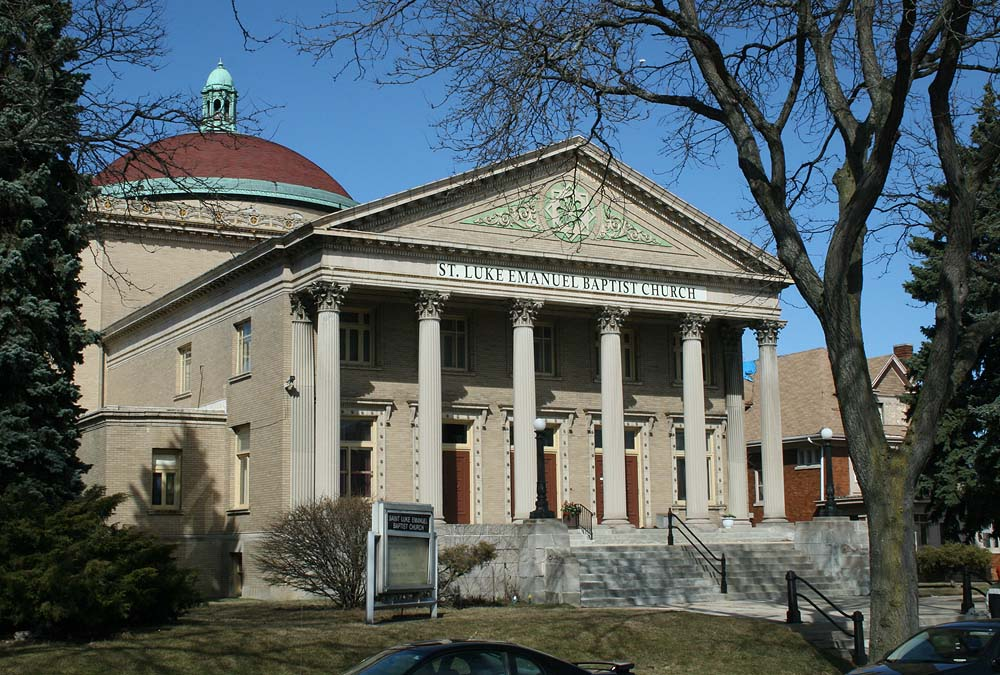
- Second Church of Christ, Scientist
- Location: 2722 W. Highland Blvd. Milwaukee, Wisconsin
- Coordinates: 43.04513°N 87.94845°W
- Built: 1913
- Architect: Carl Barkhausen
- Architectural style: Classical Revival
- MPS: West Side Area MRA
- NRHP reference No.: 86000139
- Added to NRHP: January 16, 1986

The St. Luke Emanuel Missionary Baptist Church, formally Second Church of Christ, Scientist, is a historic Neoclassical-styled church built in 1913 in Milwaukee, Wisconsin. It was added to the National Register of Historic Places in 1986.

It was in 1866 that Mary Baker Eddy slipped on the ice and hurt her back, then experienced a remarkable recovery without medical help, which prompted her ideas of metaphysical healing. In 1876 she established the first Christian Scientist Association in Lynn, Massachusetts. In 1879 she established the Mother Church in Boston. In 1884 a Christian Science Association was established in Milwaukee, the first such association outside Massachusetts.

After years of renames, splits, mergers, and moves, in 1909 one of the spinoff congregations incorporated as Second Church of Christ, Scientist, Milwaukee. They initially met at Plankinton Hall of the Milwaukee Auditorium, but in 1914 moved to their new church, the subject of this article.

Architect Carl Barkhausen of Milwaukee somewhat modeled the 1914 church on the Pantheon in Rome, which was built 2000 years ago. The front entrance is through a two-story portico with six fluted Corinthian columns supporting a pediment in which the tympanum is decorated with terra cotta. Inside the portico is a vestibule, and behind that the main auditorium. That auditorium has a pulpit and organ in an apse in the wall, with pews circled around, seating 1,450 people. The roof of the auditorium is a low dome topped with a copper roof lantern.

The Christian Science Association that built the church eventually declined, and the building was occupied by St. Luke Emanuel Missionary Baptist Church.
