= Gimbels Parking Pavilion =

- U.S. National Register of Historic Places
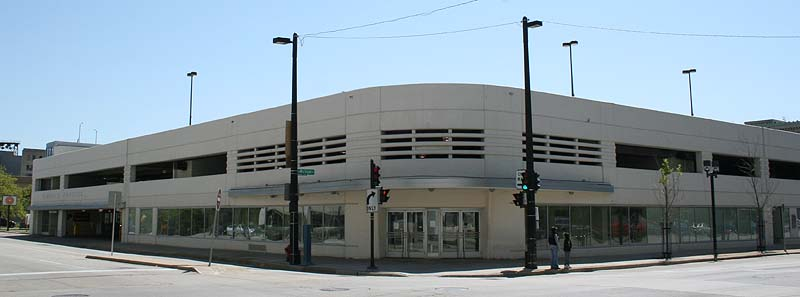
- Gimbels Parking Pavilion
- Location: 555 N. Plankinton Ave. Milwaukee, Wisconsin
- Coordinates: 43.03703°N 87.91178°W
- Built: 1947
- Architect: Frank Drolshagen
- Architectural style: Art Moderne
- NRHP reference No.: 01000310
- Added to NRHP: March 29, 2001

The Gimbels Parking Pavilion is an Art Moderne–style parking ramp built by Gimbels Department Store for its customers in Milwaukee, Wisconsin, in 1947. It was added to the National Register of Historic Places in 2001.

== History ==
In 1887 the Gimbel family from Vincennes, Indiana, bought a four-story building in Milwaukee's premier shopping district and moved their retail operation, setting up a department store selling goods like cloaks, carpeting and curtains, and offering credit and free delivery—a new type of store at the time. Gimbel Brothers Department Store prospered over the years, and one construction project after another expanded the building.

When Gimbel's opened in 1887, people traveled by streetcar, by buggy, or by foot. After the turn of the century automobiles began appearing; e.g. 1908 saw the appearance of the Ford Model T, the first car affordable to the middle class. Numbers of cars climbed through 1930s, then dropped during WWII. Starting in 1945 they began to rise again, from 131,963 vehicles registered in Milwaukee in 1945 to 158,812 in 1947. The city had been considering parking shortages for years; in 1947, Gimbels addressed their part of the problem on their own.

Gimbels acquired space for the parking pavilion across the street from their store. Architect Frank Drolshagen and engineer V.K. Boynton designed the pavilion in Art Moderne style, typified by smooth lines and curves suggested by airplane forms, and a modern feel disconnected from historic styles. At the curved corner entrance was a store called Electric City where Gimbels sold electrical appliances in the early years. Valets at the store parked cars, sold gas, and washed cars while customers shopped.

Gimbels Pavilion was placed on the NRHP for several reasons. It stands as a surviving example of attendant-staffed parking designed to handle the popularity of the auto in Milwaukee's downtown. It is also the only Art Moderne–styled parking garage in Milwaukee, though other buildings like the Exton Apartments Building at 1260 N. Prospect are in the same style.
