= Edward J. Dahinden House =

Historic house in Wisconsin, United States

- U.S. National Register of Historic Places
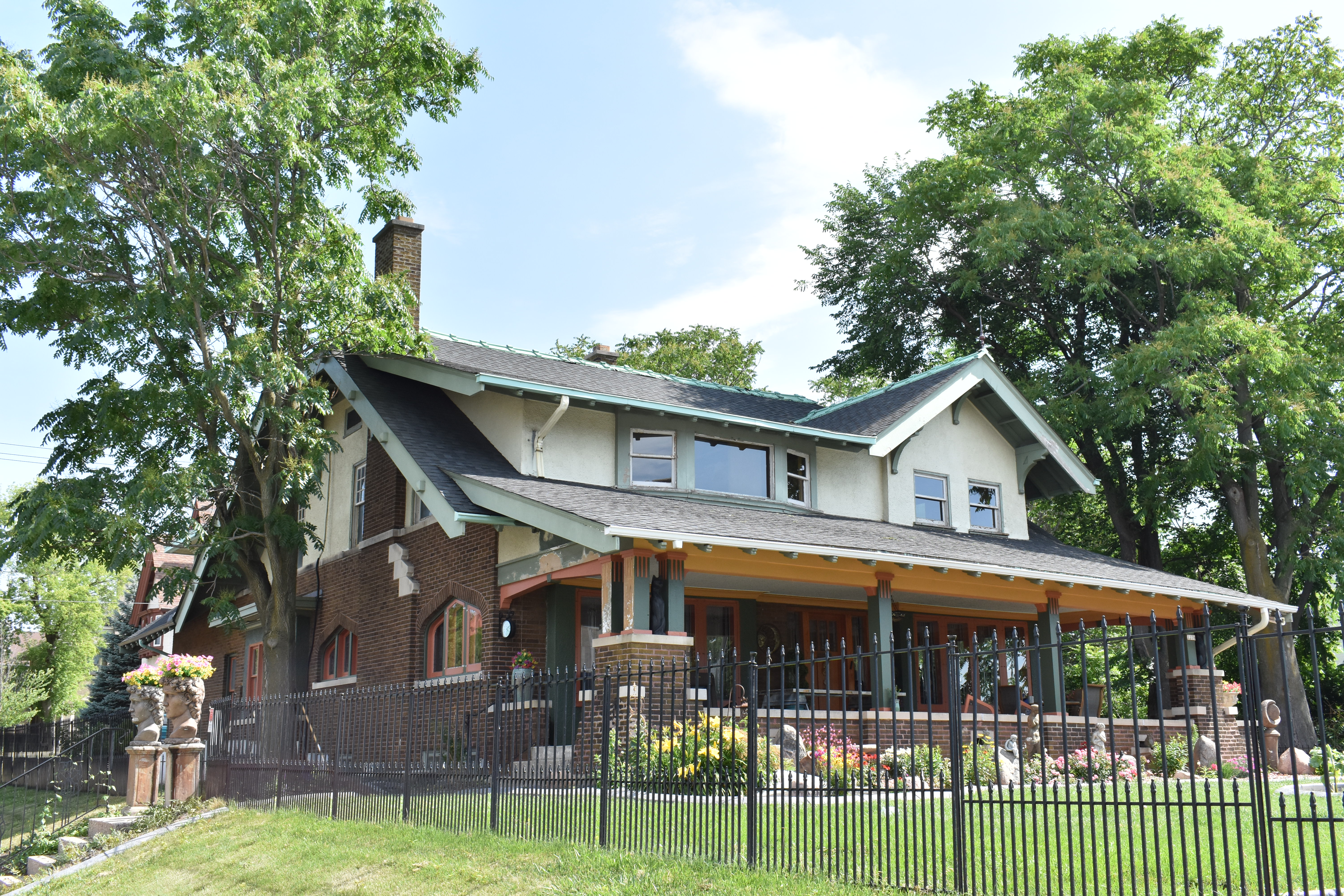

- Location within Wisconsin Location within the United States
- Location: 3316 W. Wisconsin Ave. Milwaukee, Wisconsin
- Coordinates: 43°2′20″N 87°57′21″W
- Area: less than one acre
- Built: 1914
- Architect: Charles Tharinger
- Architectural style: American Craftsman
- NRHP reference No.: 86000313
- Added to NRHP: February 25, 1986

The Edward J. Dahinden House is a large Craftsman-style house built in 1914 in Milwaukee, Wisconsin for an officer of the Franzen Paper Company. In 1986 it was placed on the National Register of Historic Places.

== Description and history ==
Edward Dahinden was an organizer of the Franzen Paper Company. He served as secretary and treasurer of the company and then president. During that time he had Milwaukee architect Charles Tharinger design a home for him, and it was built in 1914. The house is 2 1/2 stories, in the then-popular Craftsman style, clad in dark brick and stucco, with a full-width front porch, and a jerkin-head gable roof with wide eaves. The NRHP nomination deems it "one of the largest and best Bungalow style residences in the city."

After serving as a residence, the building housed a doctor's office and then a law office.
