= Saint Anthony Hospital (Milwaukee, Wisconsin) =

- U.S. National Register of Historic Places
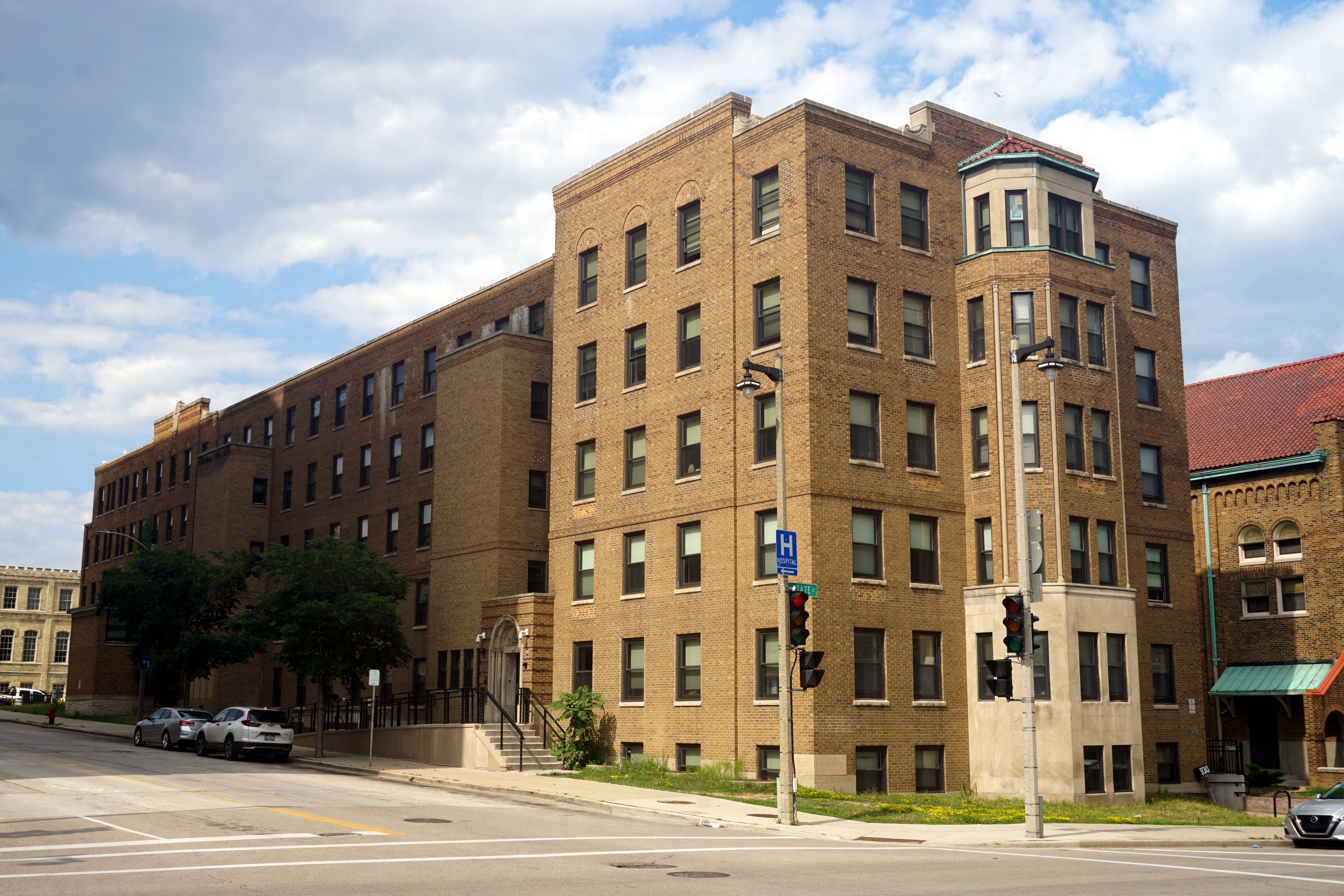
- Location: 1004 N. 10th St. Milwaukee, Wisconsin
- Built: 1931, 1947, 1966, 1974
- Architect: E. Brielmaier and Sons Co./Brielmaier, Sherer and Sherer/Mark F. Pfaller and Associates/Wenzel, Zoller, Gunn and Associates
- Architectural style: Mediterranean Revival
- NRHP reference No.: 100001724
- Added to NRHP: October 6, 2017

Saint Anthony Hospital is a historic building located in Milwaukee, Wisconsin.

== History ==
When founded, St. Anthony primarily served Milwaukee's African-American population and was co-founded by Wisconsin's first Black physician, Dr. Allen Herron. In 1954, Dr. John W. Maxwell, Sr. became Wisconsin's first-ever Black hospital chief of staff when he took the top job at St. Anthony. After five decades serving as a hospital, it was converted for a brief time to become a family medical center in the late 1980s before closing outright.

The facility has also been used as a detention center — it is located across the street from the Milwaukee Secure Detention Facility — although St. Anthony was vacant for the majority of the '90s, '00s, and '10s.

The loss of St. Anthony as a medical hub is a contributing factor to the ongoing "medical desert" problem affecting Milwaukee's predominantly Black population.

The building was added to the State and the National Register of Historic Places in 2017.

In 2019, nonprofit organizations began converting the building to provide low-income housing, a project that collapsed during the COVID-19 pandemic. In 2025, the reentry nonprofit Project RETURN, Inc., moved in and is currently providing housing to men at risk of homelessness as they exit incarceration.
