= Harley-Davidson Motor Company Factory No. 7 =

Wisconsin State Historic Place

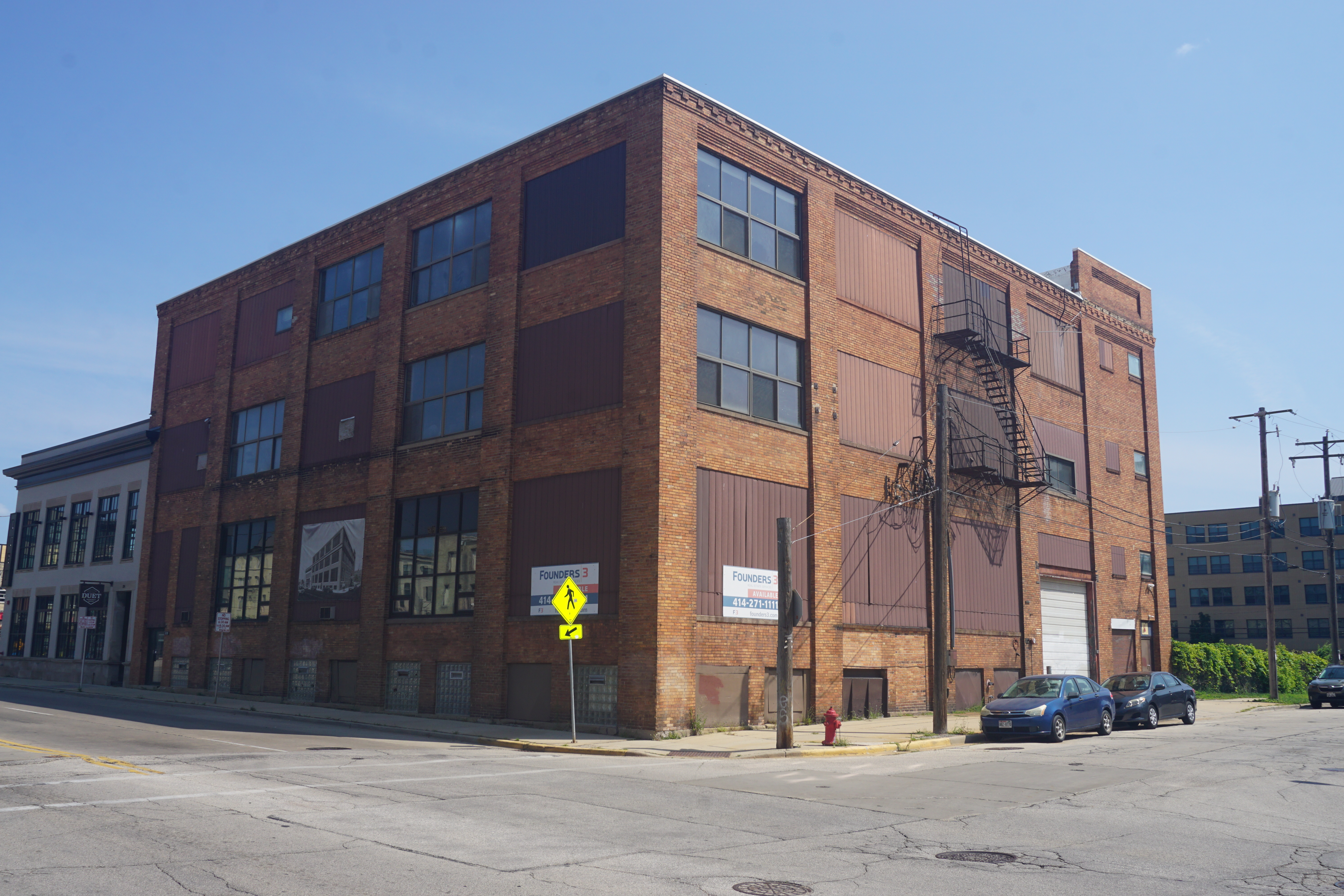

General information
- Location: Milwaukee, Wisconsin, United States

Harley-Davidson Motor Company Factory No. 7 is a factory building of the Harley-Davidson company in Milwaukee listed on the Wisconsin State Register of Historic Places. It was at this plant where the company invented and refined the automated system for casting and milling engine parts and wheel hubs for their motorcycles, which helped to secure the company's position as a leader in motorcycle manufacturing. This factory building was added to the state register on August 14, 2020.
