= Salem Evangelical Church (Milwaukee, Wisconsin) =

Historic church in Wisconsin, United States

- U.S. National Register of Historic Places
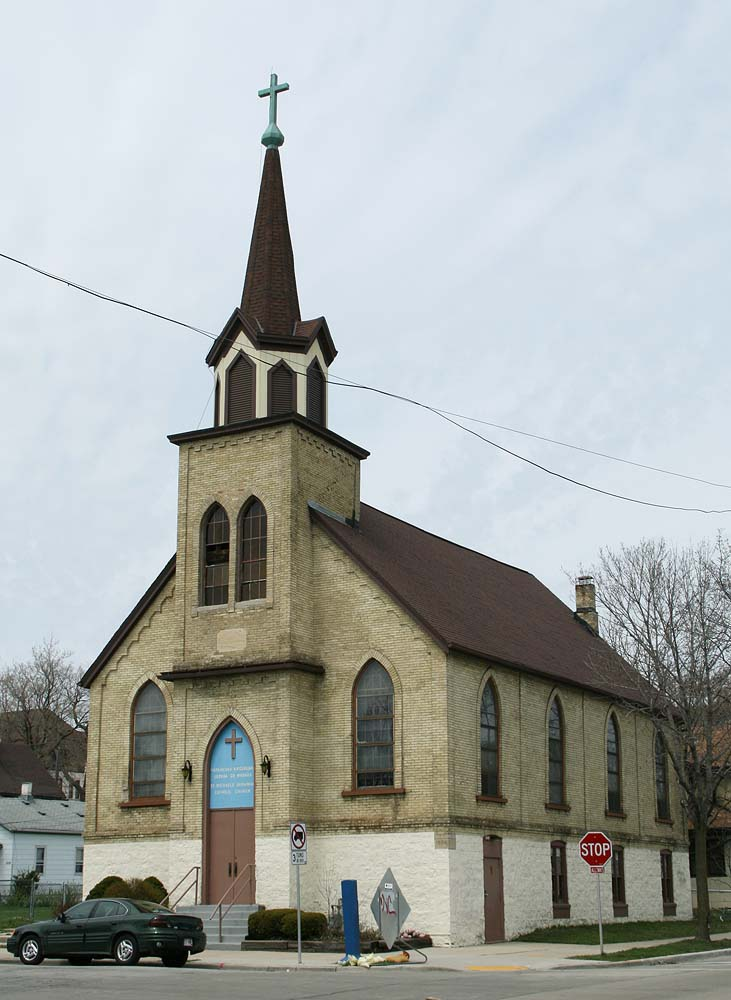
- Salem Evangelical Church
- Location: 1025 and 1037 S. 11th St. Milwaukee, Wisconsin
- Coordinates: 43.02035°N 87.92556°W
- Built: 1874
- Architectural style: Gothic Revival/Italianate
- NRHP reference No.: 87001760
- Added to NRHP: October 1, 1987

Salem Evangelical Church (also known as St. Michaels Ukrainian Catholic Church) is a modest Victorian Gothic church built in 1874 in Milwaukee, Wisconsin. It was added to the National Register of Historic Places in 1987 for its architectural significance, and for being "the oldest surviving church building in the near south side... associated with a German congregation."

Milwaukee's near South Side was settled in the early 1850s by a mix of German immigrants and Yankees, with other immigrants joining later. In 1865 Zion Evangelical Church at 1418 West Greenfield launched a mission to serve the local German immigrants, which formed into Salem congregation in 1867. Salem initially bought a frame Lutheran church building, but by 1874 they had outgrown that, so constructed the building that is the subject of this article.

The 1874 building is small and symmetric, with brick walls on a limestone foundation. Windows have lancet tops, identifying the architectural style as Gothic Revival. The windows are framed in shallow brick pilasters and a decorative pattern is worked into the brick under the eaves. The front door is at the base of a square tower which rises to an octagonal wooden belfry, then a spire, with an onion-shaped bulb and a cross at the top. The unusual features are the high foundation and the bulb beneath the cross. The cost in 1874 was $6,849.34.

A rectory was also built in 1874 - a modest 2-story brick Italianate-styled building with brick hood moulds above the square windows and two oculus windows facing the street.

Salem worshiped in this church for 50 years, then moved to South Thirtieth and West Mitchell. At that point (1924) the 1874 building was bought by Augustana Evangelical Lutheran Church, a congregation of Swedish immigrants who were just introducing some services in English. They stayed in the building until 1933.

In 1934 the building was occupied by the Sacred Heart of Jesus Polish National Catholic Church. These were dissidents from Roman Catholicism who did not acknowledge the Pope. They dissolved in 1953 when their priest retired.

In 1953, St. Michael's Ukrainian Catholic Church moved in, and is still there, the only Ukrainian Catholic Church in Wisconsin. The icons and iconostatis inside are particular to this last denomination, and not original.

The NRHP nomination recognizes the Salem Church building as the south side's oldest brick Gothic Revival church, the oldest surviving church building associated with a German congregation, and the best surviving example of modest churches built by pioneer congregations in new neighborhoods in the years after the Civil War.
