= North Third Street Historic District (Milwaukee, Wisconsin) =

Historic building in Milwaukee, Wisconsin

- U.S. National Register of Historic Places
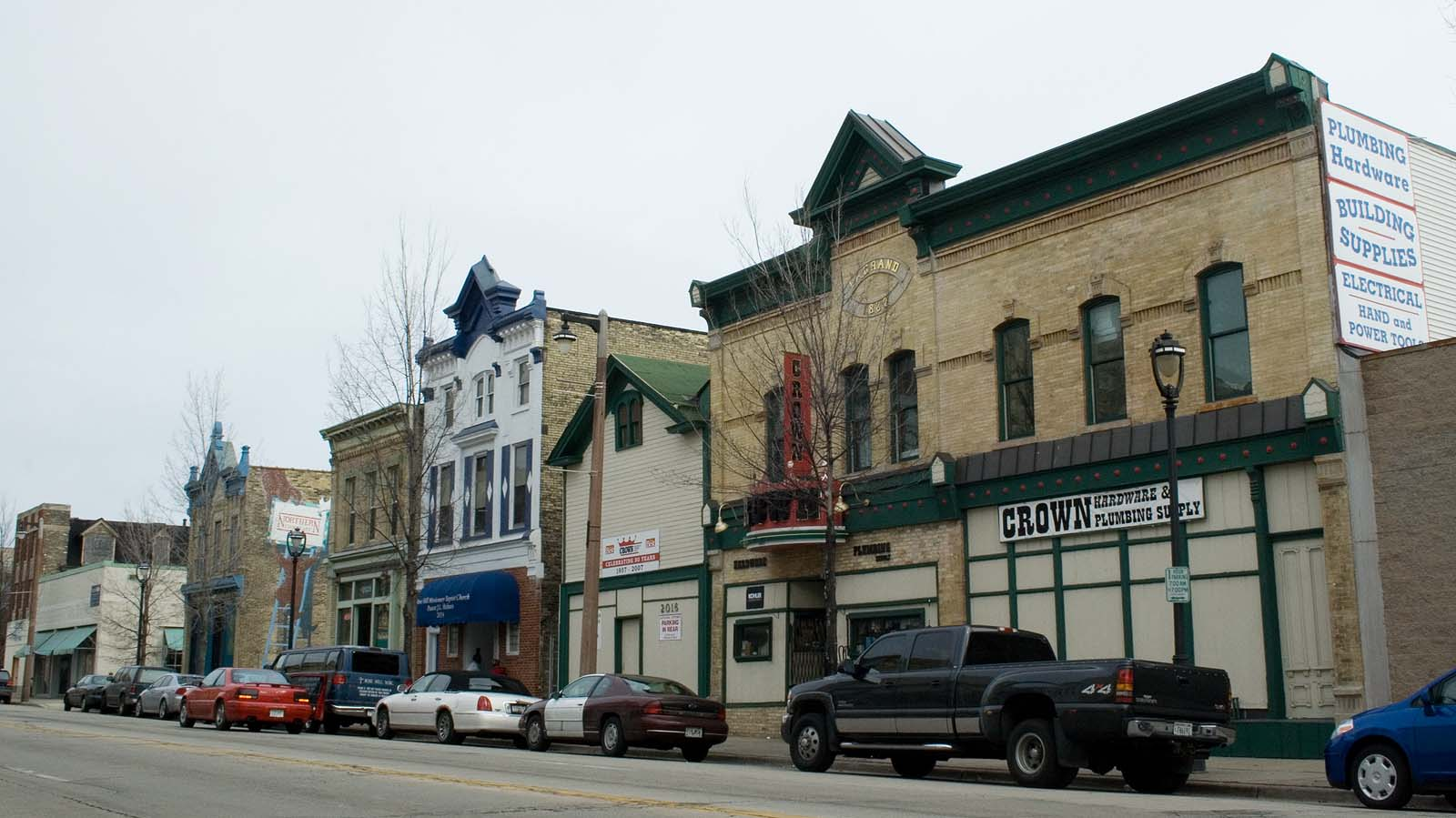
- A portion of the district.
- Location: Roughly N. 3rd St. between N. 3rd Ave. and Vine St. Milwaukee, Wisconsin
- NRHP reference No.: 84003733
- Added to NRHP: August 2, 1984

The North Third Street Historic District is a somewhat intact business district on the near north side of Milwaukee, Wisconsin, with a wide range of surviving buildings dating back to 1854. It was listed on the National Register of Historic Places in 1984 and on the State Register of Historic Places in 1989.

In the 1850s development began at the intersection of Third Street and Juneau Avenue and gradually grew to the north - the first major business district outside Milwaukee's central business district a mile to the south. Business has continued there for many years, so the district contains examples of many phases. Here are some of the best:

- The Hardt block at 1739-1745 N. 3rd Street is a 2-story brick commercial block built in 1854. The first occupant was baker Adam Englehardt, who stayed there until 1869. The building's design is Romanesque Revival, the style whose hallmark is the round arches at the window-tops. Bricks form pilasters, the corbelled cornice, and the pediment at top center. This is the oldest surviving building in the district.
- The house at 1948 N. 3rd Street was built in 1868 - a 2-story frame house with the windows and doors topped by curved hood moulds drawn from Italianate style.
- The George Geiger building at 1751 N. 3rd Street was built in 1882 for Geiger's grocery business. It was designed by Henry Messmer, with simple Italianate styling.
- The Deffner building at 2034-2036 N. 3rd Street was built in 1885, a 2-story Victorian Italianate building with a pressed metal cornice. John C. Deffner was Bavarian immigrant harness-maker who also ran a horse furnishings store out of this building.
- The building at 1806-1808 N. 3rd Street is a 3-story brick structure built in 1890, with bay windows and an elaborate cornice and corner finials drawn from German Renaissance Revival style.
- The Mayer and Durner building at 2000-2006 N. 3rd Street was built in 1891. It was designed by German immigrant Henry Messmer, who drew the bay window from Queen Anne style, the hood moulds over the windows and the pediment from Italianate style, and the upward-pointing finials from Gothic Revival. Herman Mayer's crockery store was the first occupant, until 1906. Then Adolph Haise ran a drug store there until 1921.
- The Hausmann building at 1748-1750 N. 3rd Street is a 3-story building built in 1891 for Hannah and Julius Hausmann's dry goods store. The building was designed by H.C. Koch in a style which combined several styles. The round-arched door is Richardsonian Romanesque. The bay windows and corner turret are Queen Anne.
- The Frederick Ketter Warehouse at 325 W. Vine Street is a Romanesque Revival brick structure built in 1895. It probably served as a grocery warehouse for Ketter.
- The Edward Schuster & Company Department Store at 2153 N. 3rd Street is a 4-story department store designed by Kirchhoff & Rose in Chicago Commercial style and built in 1907. Hallmarks of the style are the bands of windows and the large amount of window space. In 1961 Schuster merged with Gimbel Brothers.
- The Dorsen Office building at 2208-2218 N. 3rd Street is a 4-story building designed by Martin Tullgren & Sons and built in 1923. Its style is Neoclassical, with the front clad in white terra cotta. The original tenants were physicians, dentists, realtors, hairdressers, Radio Listeners Association, and the Better Motoring Association.
- The Edward Schuster & Co. building at 2007 N. 3rd Street was built in 1892, designed by Schnetzky and Liebert and built by Anton Mauk. After the original building was damaged by a fire, Lindle and Schutts designed the current front from 1929, which has a pattern of terra cotta pink diamonds framed by pilasters which are themselves framed by rope-like columns. The design draws from Neoclassical, Beaux-Arts and Art Deco styles with a Moorish flavor.
- The Home Savings Bank at 2200 N. 3rd Street is a 5-story building designed by Kirchhoff & Rose in a simple Art Deco style and built in 1930.
