= Eagle Knitting Mills =

Former knitted textiles company located in Milwaukee, Wisconsin

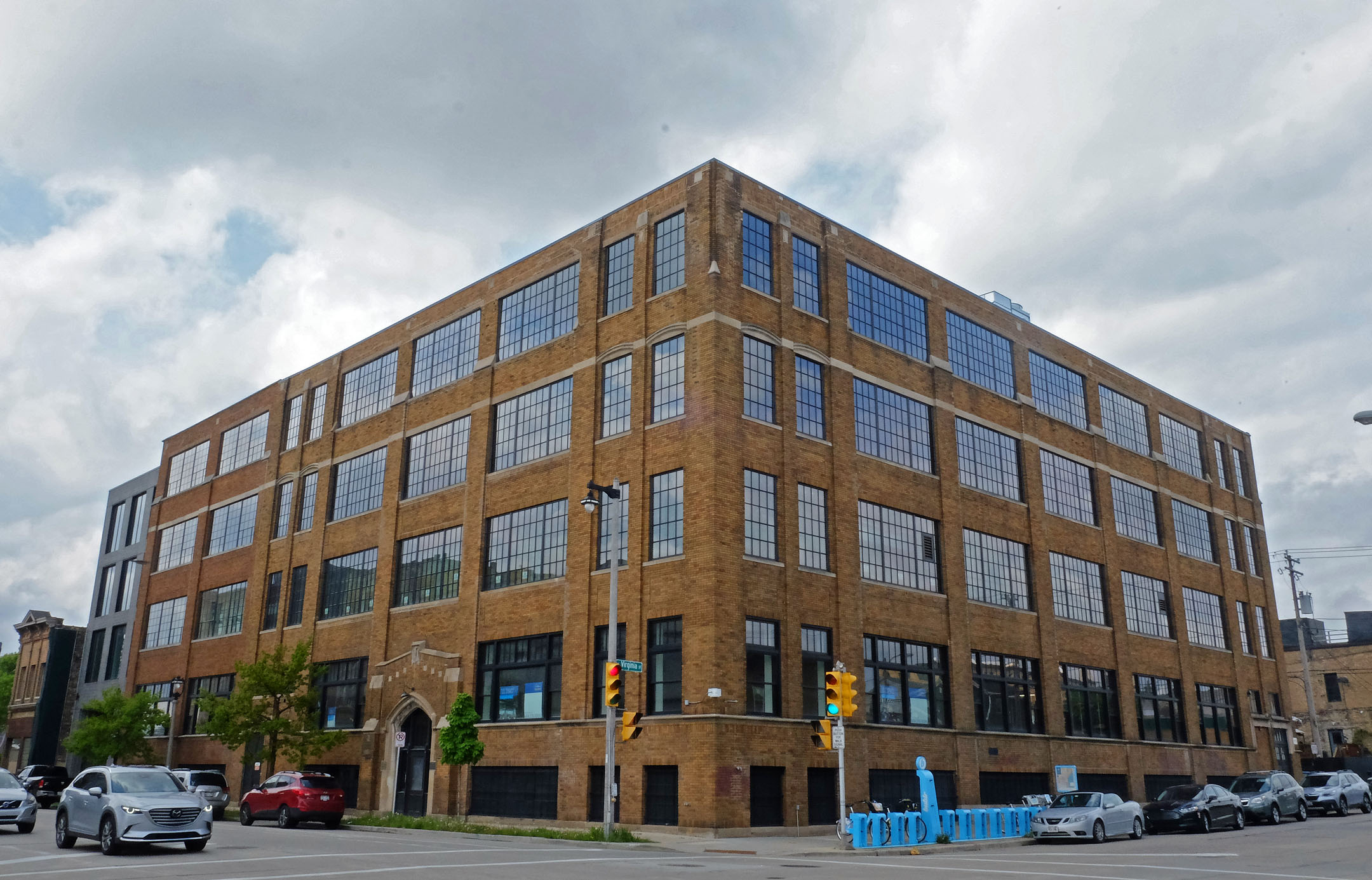
- Main factory building, 2022
- Defunct: 1991
- Fate: closed
- Successor: Zwicker Knitting Mills
- Headquarters: Milwaukee, Wisconsin, United States

Eagle Knitting Mills was a knitted textiles company located in Milwaukee, Wisconsin, widely known in the early 20th century as the manufacturer of the original patented earlap cap.

In 1930, Eagle bought Stern Knitting Mills of Peoria, Illinois, and moved the entire production to Milwaukee. During the Great Depression, Eagle was one of many companies in Wisconsin that proclaimed it would guarantee their employees' jobs, ensuring some stability for the workers. In 1937, the company president, David Karger, was reported as receiving an annual salary of $24,000 (equivalent to $524,944 in 2024).

In 1952 Eagle was awarded a Federal contract worth more than $250,000 to produce wool mufflers.

The company was sold in 1963 to Zwicker Knitting Mills in 1963. The plant in Milwaukee was finally closed in 1991.

The main factory building was added to the Wisconsin State Register of Historic Places on August 14, 2020, and to the National Register of Historic Places on November 12, 2020.
