= St. George Melkite Catholic Church =

Historic church in Wisconsin, United States

- U.S. National Register of Historic Places
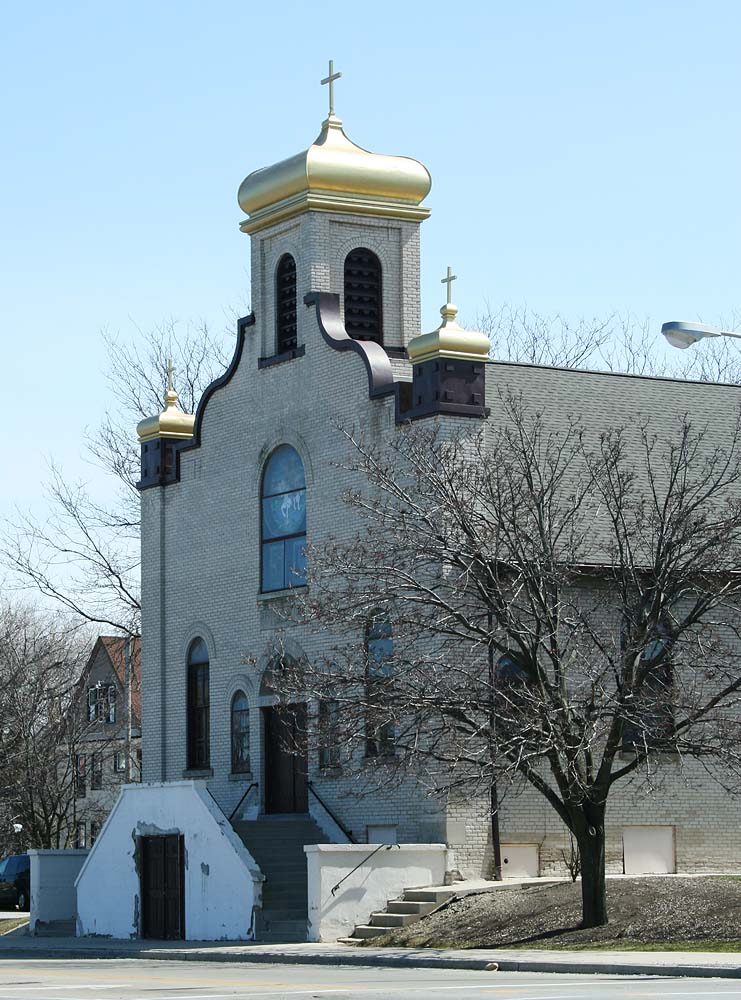
- St. George Melkite Catholic Church
- Location: 1617 W. State St. Milwaukee, Wisconsin
- Coordinates: 43.04301°N 87.93346°W
- Architect: Erhard Brielmaier & Sons
- Architectural style: Byzantine Revival
- NRHP reference No.: 86000128
- Added to NRHP: January 16, 1986

St. George Melkite Catholic Church is a Melkite Greek Catholic Church, located in Milwaukee, Wisconsin. It was added to the National Register of Historic Places in 1986. The church was built in 1917 to serve the needs of the Syrian-Lebanese community who migrated to Milwaukee after the Chicago World's Fair of 1892. It is the second oldest Melkite church in the United States.

Syrian immigrants began to arrive in Milwaukee in 1895, settling in the neighborhood that surrounds the current church. Though many had grown up in the Melkite Greek Catholic Church, they didn't speak English or Latin, so weren't a fit for nearby Roman Catholic parishes. In 1911 Reverend Timothy Jock was assigned to the Syrians, holding services in a former dance hall.

In 1915 the congregation began to worship in a house at 1615 West State. Shortly after, they began planning a new church. It was designed by architect Erhard Brielmaier with St. George Church of Ain-Berdel (also referred to as Ain-Borday and Ain-Bordal), Lebanon in mind. The resulting building is one story, with a gable roof and tall windows behind the facade that are conventional for a Wisconsin church. But the facade has a Byzantine flavor, with the shaped parapet wall and the three bulbous domes.

== See also ==
- Melkite Greek Catholic Church
- Christianity in Lebanon
- Catholicism in Lebanon
- Maronite Christianity in Lebanon
- Eastern Orthodox Christianity in Lebanon
