= Cornelia Atwood Pratt Comer =

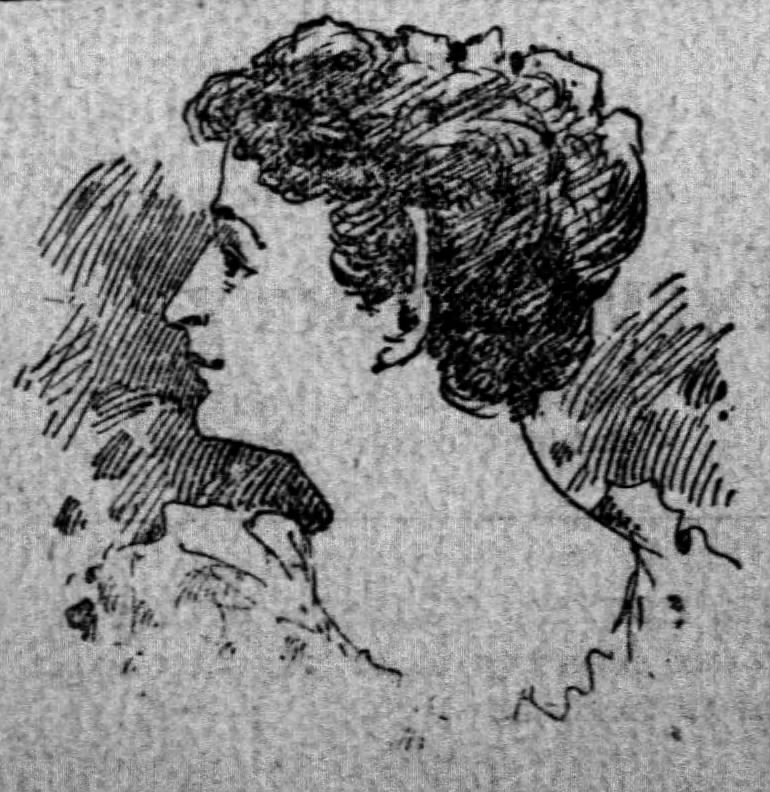
- Born: March 26, 1865; Bryan
- Died: December 29, 1929; Tucson
- Education: Vassar College

Cornelia Atwood Pratt Comer (March 26, 1865 – December 29, 1929) was an American novelist, short story writer, journalist, essayist, and literary critic.

Cornelia Atwood Pratt was born on March 26, 1865, in Bryan, Ohio, the daughter of Albert Mansfield Pratt and Elizabeth Cornelia Atwood. She graduated from Vassar College in 1887. In 1905, she married banker William D. Comer.

She wrote for the publications New York Critic, St. Paul Globe, and the Seattle Post-Intelligencer. Her writings include the essay "A Letter to the Rising Generation" (1911) in The Atlantic Monthly, full of perennial complaints that older people have for younger ones. She published novels and short stories in various publications, including the ghost story "The Gray Little Ghost" (1912) in The Atlantic Monthly. Her novel Dr. Berkeley's Discovery (1899), written with physician Richard Slee, features the invention of a device which can project images from a deceased person's brain.

Cornelia Atwood Pratt Comer died on 29 December 1929 in Tucson, Arizona.

== Bibliography ==
- A Book of Martyrs. New York: Charles Scribner's Sons, 1896.
- The Daughter of a Stoic. New York: Macmillan, 1896.
- ( with Richard Slee) Dr. Berkeley's Discovery New York and London: G P Putnam's Sons, 1899.
- The Preliminaries and Other Stories. Boston: Houghton Mifflin Co, 1912.
