= St. Luke's Episcopal Church, Chapel, Guildhall, and Rectory =

Historic church in Wisconsin, United States

- U.S. National Register of Historic Places
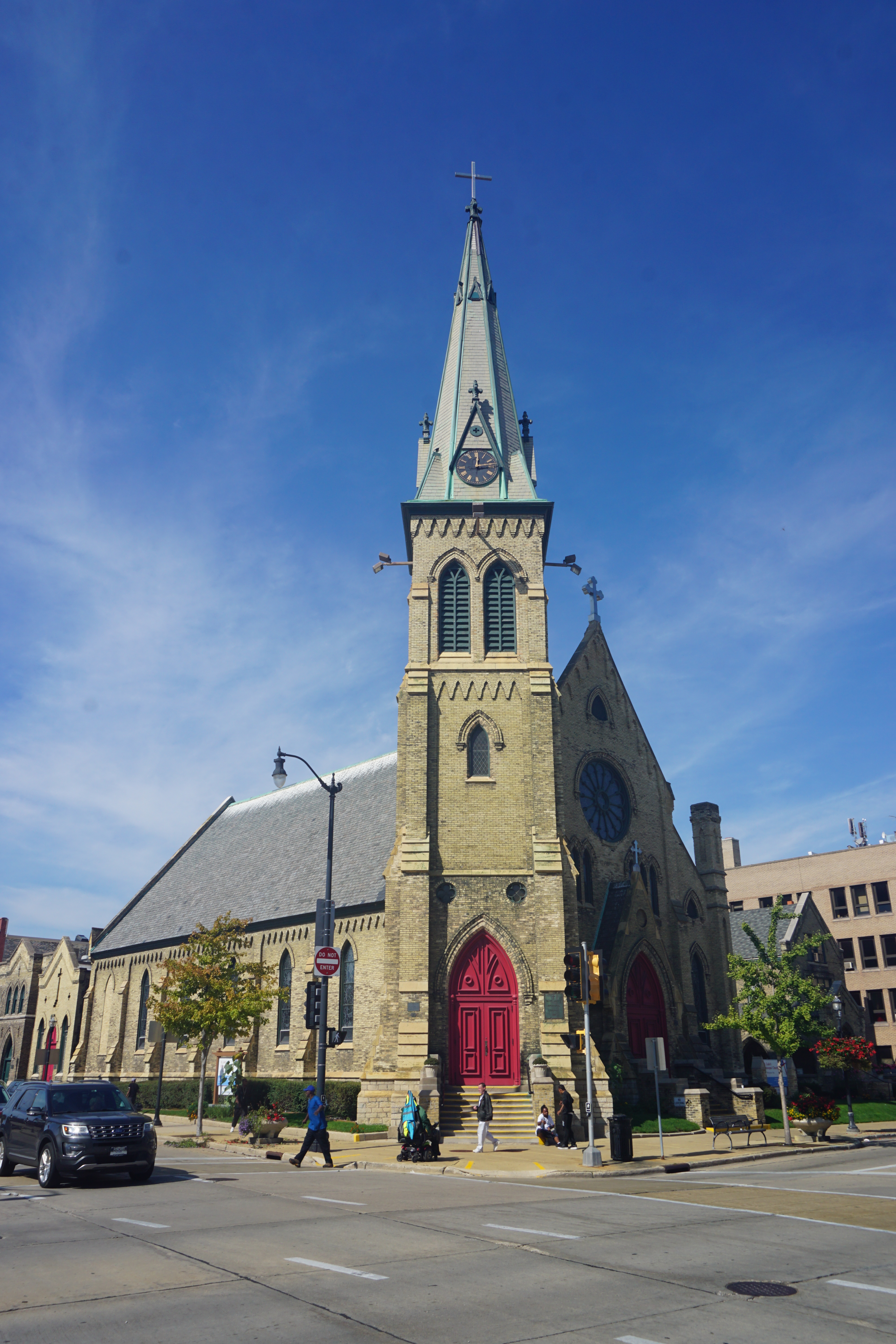
- St. Luke's Episcopal Church, Chapel, Guildhall, and Rectory
- Location: 614 S. Main St. Racine, Wisconsin
- Coordinates: 42.72617°N 87.78300°W
- Built: 1866
- Architectural style: Gothic Revival
- NRHP reference No.: 79000105
- Added to NRHP: July 27, 1979

St. Luke's Episcopal Church, Chapel, Guildhall, and Rectory is a historic church complex in Racine, Wisconsin. It was added to the National Register of Historic Places in 1979 for its architectural significance.

St. Luke's parish was established in 1842, the ninth Episcopal parish in Wisconsin. Its first church building burned in 1866. That same year E. Townsend Mix of Milwaukee began designing the replacement, which remains the current church building. Lucas Bradley built it. Its style is Gothic Revival, with walls of cream brick, buttresses, a rose window above the main entrance, lancet windows, and a 150-foot corner tower turned 45 degrees from the rest of the building. The steeple is octagonal, with four clocks from the Seth Thomas Co. The church is close to the same design that Mix used for First Methodist in Monroe.

Behind the church on 7th Street is the Chapel of the Holy Spirit. It was originally built in 1849 as an early fire station — Engine House No. 3. In 1899 it was donated to the church and converted to a chapel. In 1930 it was restyled Gothic Revival to complement the church.

In 1898 the parish built a guildhall west of the firehouse. It is styled Gothic Revival like the other buildings, with lancet windows and a cross in the brickwork.

Between 1905 and 1910 the rectory was added, a 2 1/2-story cream-brick building designed by A. Arthur Guilbert in Gothic Revival style. It has since been converted to serve as Parish Center, with an auditorium added in 1956.
