= E. Townsend Mix =

American architect

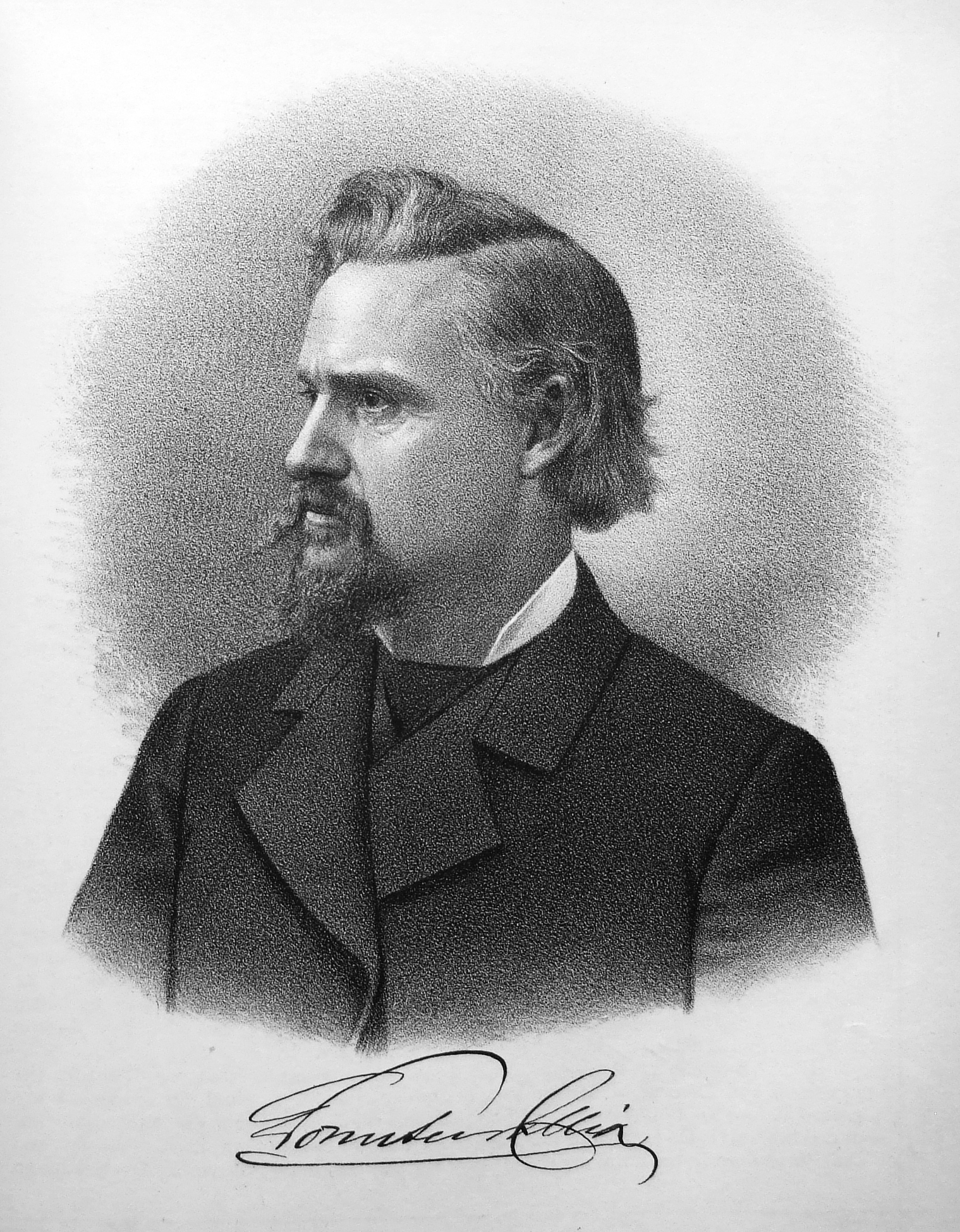
E. Townsend Mix

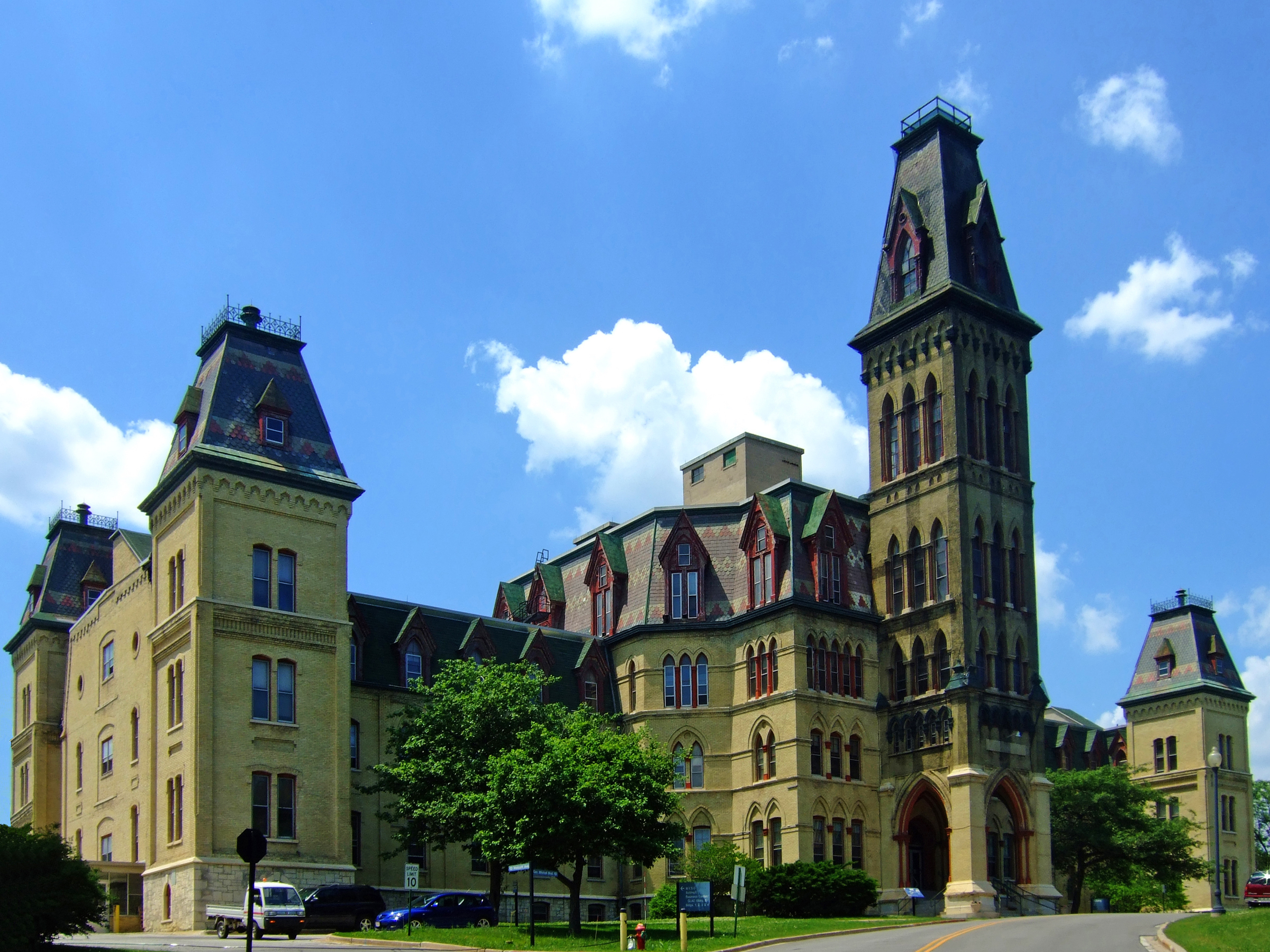
The National Soldiers' Home in Milwaukee was designed by Mix in the High Victorian Gothic style during the 1860s.

Edward Townsend Mix (May 13, 1831 – September 2, 1890) was an American architect of the Gilded Age who designed many buildings in the Midwestern United States. His career was centered in Milwaukee, Wisconsin, and many of his designs made use of the region's distinctive Cream City brick.

== Biography ==
Mix was born in New Haven, Connecticut, on May 13, 1831, the first child of Edward A. and Emily M. Mix. The family moved west to Andover, Illinois, in 1836. They relocated again to New York City in 1845, where E. Townsend Mix began studying architecture. He would eventually be apprenticed to Connecticut architect Sidney Mason Stone. Mix also studied under Richard Upjohn, who brought Mix towards the Gothic Revival architecture that would become one of his most enduring styles.

In 1855, E. Townsend Mix moved to Chicago, Illinois, and began a brief partnership with architect William W. Boyington. The firm's work took Mix to Milwaukee, Wisconsin, where he decided to begin an independent practice in 1856. Mix dissolved his partnership with Boyington and began designing homes and businesses for Milwaukee's leading residents.

Mix was appointed Wisconsin's State Architect from 1864 to 1867. The end of the Civil War brought an important contract when he was chosen to design the Milwaukee branch of the National Soldiers' Home for disabled war veterans. The resulting structure, finished in 1869, is a colorful Gothic Revival building that still towers over the surrounding park and cemetery. Mix also designed the Gothic Revival Cathedral Church of All Saints and the Monroe Methodist Church at about this time.

Mix's career further accelerated when the new state of Kansas selected his French Renaissance design for the Kansas State Capitol in Topeka. Construction began in 1866, and several other architects including John G. Haskell modified Mix's design before the building was completed 37 years later.

During the early 1870s, Mix designed a number of Italianate homes for prominent Midwestern families, including Villa Louis in Prairie du Chien for H. Louis Dousman in 1870, and in 1874 both the Robert Patrick Fitzgerald House in Milwaukee and Montauk in Clermont, Iowa, home of Iowa governor William Larrabee.

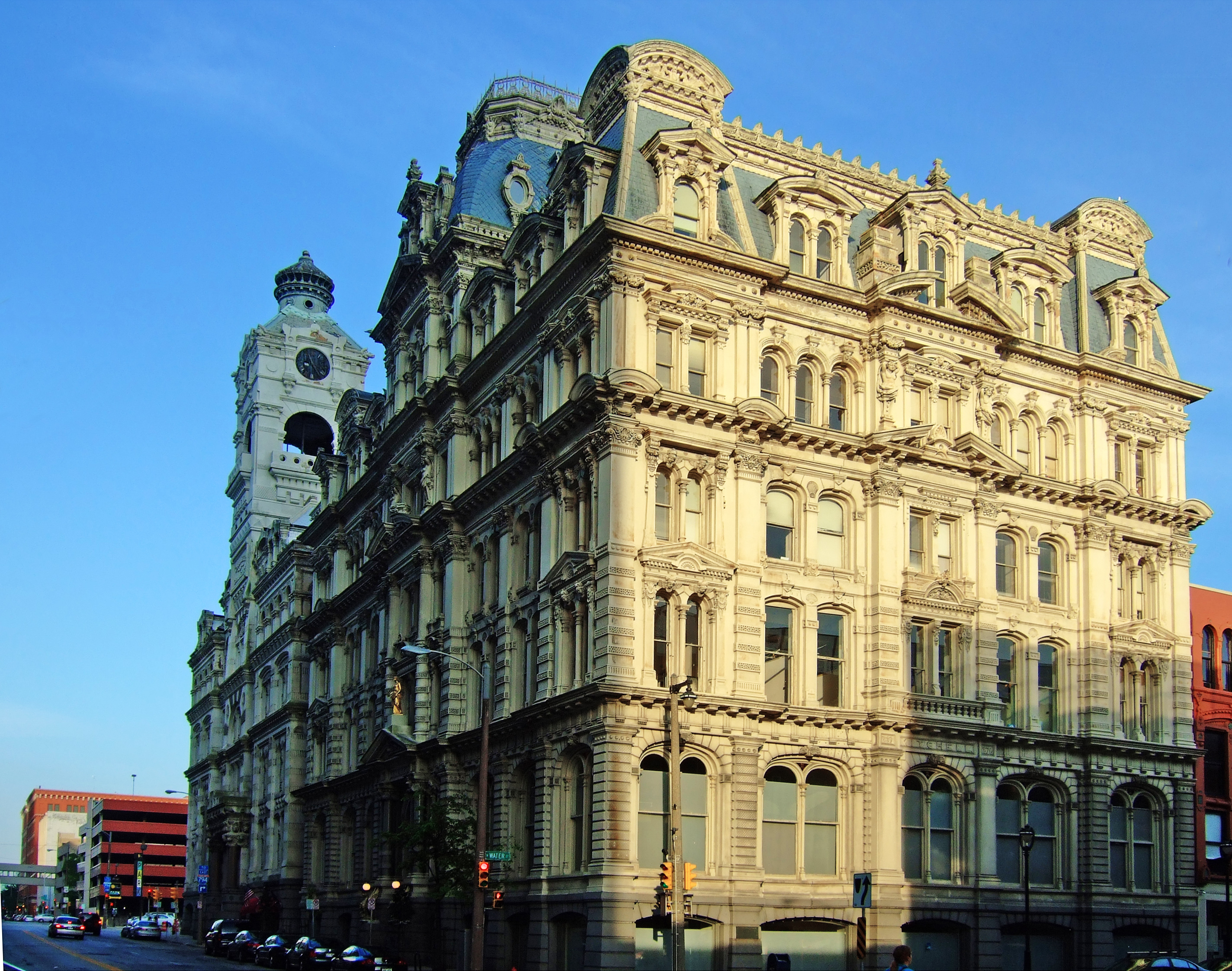
The Mitchell Building and immediately adjacent Mackie Building exemplify Mix's work in the ornate Second Empire Style during the 1870s.

By the second half of the 1870s, Mix shifted much of his focus to the Second Empire style. In 1873 he remodeled the home of leading Milwaukee businessman Alexander Mitchell in this style, giving it a four-story tower and mansard roofs. Later Mitchell would hire Mix to use the same style in designing two commercial buildings in downtown Milwaukee: the Mitchell Building in 1876 and the Mackie Building in 1879.

In the 1880s, Mix adopted a number of additional styles for his buildings. He used Romanesque Revival for St. Paul's Episcopal Church, built in Milwaukee in 1874, and he employed elements of Queen Anne and Eastlake styles for the A. H. Allyn House in Delavan, Wisconsin, in 1885. Mix sometimes mixed these styles with Gothic Revival, as in the Everett Street Depot built in 1886 for the Milwaukee Road. By this time, however, the styles favored by Mix were falling out of fashion in Milwaukee as its increasingly German population demanded buildings more reminiscent of their homeland.

Later in his career Mix also designed a number of projects in Minneapolis and Saint Paul, Minnesota (he would eventually move to Minneapolis in 1888). In 1883 he designed a grand mansion for William D. Washburn called Fair Oaks. He designed a pair of buildings for the Saint Paul Globe newspaper, one in Saint Paul (1887) and another in Minneapolis (1889). In 1888 he embarked on his largest project, the Northwestern Guaranty Loan Building, a twelve-story skyscraper in Richardsonian Romanesque style built with red Lake Superior sandstone. It was finished in 1890, the year of E. Townsend Mix's death in Minneapolis.

== Legacy ==
E. Townsend Mix was a versatile architect who practiced an eclectic variety of styles, and although he sometimes mixed styles in novel ways, he did little to push the boundaries of any particular style. However, in his effort to remain abreast of changing architectural fashions, Mix introduced to the Upper Midwest many popular styles from eastern cities, and his buildings helped shape the landscape of urban Milwaukee and Minneapolis. Although urban renewal projects led to the demolition of some notable Mix buildings, including the Northwestern Guaranty Loan Building and the Everett Street Depot, many of his designs still stand, and several are listed on the National Register of Historic Places (NRHP).

== Works ==
Completed Works
Name	City	State/Country	Completed	Other Information	
First Congregational Church	Ripon	Wisconsin	1865–1868	220 Ransom St. Part of the Ripon College Historic District; NRHP-listed	
St. Luke's Episcopal Church, Chapel, Guildhall, and Rectory	Racine	Wisconsin	1866	614 S. Main St. Part of the Historic Sixth Street Business District; NRHP-listed; NRHP-listed	
Northwestern Branch, National Home for Disabled Volunteer Soldiers Historic District	Milwaukee	Wisconsin	1867	5000 W. National Ave. NRHP-listed	
Olivet Congregational Church; Now part of All Saints' Episcopal Cathedral Complex	Milwaukee	Wisconsin	1868	804–828 E. Juneau Ave. NRHP-listed	
First Methodist Church	Monroe	Wisconsin	1869–1887	11th St. and 14th Ave. NRHP-listed	
Villa Louis	Prairie du Chien	Wisconsin	1871	Villa Rd. and Bolvin St. NRHP-listed	
First Baptist Church	Waukesha	Wisconsin	1872	247 Wisconsin Ave. NRHP-listed	
Wisconsin Leather Company Building	Milwaukee	Wisconsin	1874	320 E. Clybourn St. Part of the East Side Commercial Historic District; NRHP-listed	
Immanuel Presbyterian Church	Milwaukee	Wisconsin	1875	1100 N. Astor St. NRHP-listed	
J. L. Burnham Block	Milwaukee	Wisconsin	1875	907—911 W. National Ave. NRHP-listed	
Thomas Cook House	Milwaukee	Wisconsin	1875	853 N. Seventeenth St. NRHP-listed	
Mitchell Building	Milwaukee	Wisconsin	1876	207 E. Michigan St. Part of the East Side Commercial Historic District; NRHP-listed	
Walter S. Chandler House	Waukesha	Wisconsin	1876-1877	151 W. College Ave. NRHP-listed	
Zion Evangelical Lutheran Church and Parsonage	Columbus	Wisconsin	1878	236 and 254 W. Mill St. NRHP-listed	
Mackie Building	Milwaukee	Wisconsin	1879	225 E. Michigan St. Part of the East Side Commercial Historic District; NRHP-listed	
Kansas State Capitol	Topeka	Kansas	1879-1889	Bound by 8th and 10th Aves. and Jackson and Harrison Sts. NRHP-listed	
Chauncey Hall Building	Racine	Wisconsin	1883	338–340 Main St. Part of the Historic Sixth Street Business District; NRHP-listed	
A. H. Allyn House	Delavan	Wisconsin	1885	511 E. Walworth Ave. NRHP-listed	
Milwaukee Normal School-Milwaukee Girls' Trade and Technical High School	Milwaukee	Wisconsin	1885	1820 W. Wells St. NRHP-listed	
Elizabeth Plankinton House	Milwaukee	Wisconsin	1886–88	Demolished	
Everett Street Depot	Milwaukee	Wisconsin	1886	West Everett Street between N. 2nd and N. 4th Streets	Demolished 1965
Grand Avenue Congregational Church	Milwaukee	Wisconsin	1887–1888	2133 W. Wisconsin Ave. NRHP-listed	
Northwestern Guaranty Loan Building; Later known as the Metropolitan Building	Minneapolis	Minnesota	1890	Demolished 1961. 2133 W. Wisconsin Ave. NRHP-listed	
St. Paul's Episcopal Church	Milwaukee	Wisconsin	1890	904 E. Knapp St. NRHP-listed; NRHP-listed	
Wisconsin Consistory Building	Milwaukee	Wisconsin	1893	790 N. Van Buren St. NRHP-listed	
Oneida Street Station	Milwaukee	Wisconsin	1898-1900	108 E. Wells and 816 N. Edison Sts. NRHP-listed	
Phoenix Hall, Wisconsin Institute for the Education of the Deaf and Dumb	Delavan	Wisconsin		309 W. Walworth St. NRHP-listed	
