= Wisconsin Leather Company Building =

- U.S. National Register of Historic Places
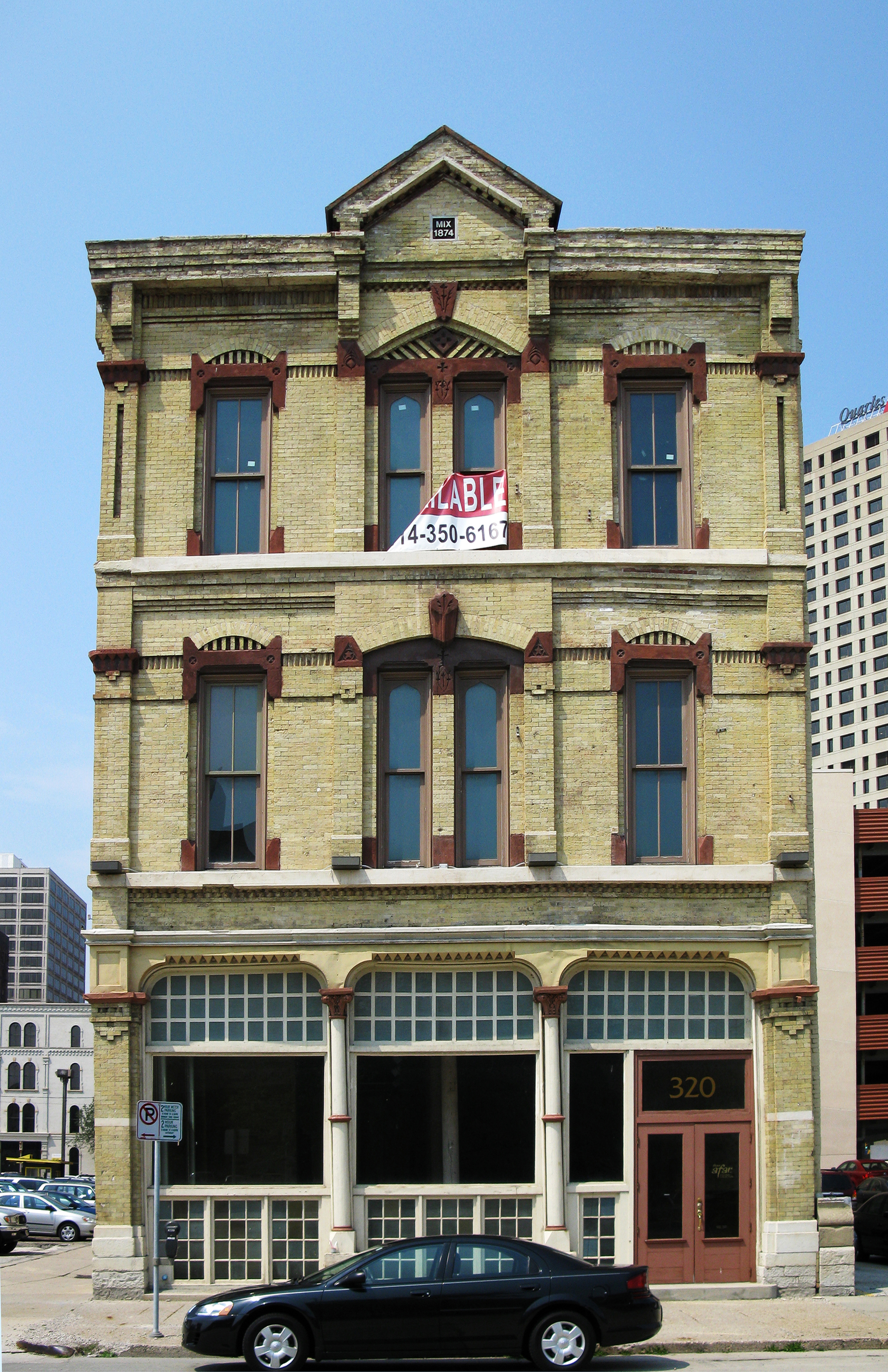
- Wisconsin Leather Company Building
- Location: 320 E. Clybourn St. Milwaukee, Wisconsin
- Coordinates: 43.03655°N 87.90657°W
- Built: 1874
- Architect: E. Townsend Mix
- Architectural style: Italianate
- NRHP reference No.: 05000250
- Added to NRHP: March 30, 2005

The Wisconsin Leather Company Building was built in 1874 in Milwaukee, Wisconsin as the central office and store of one of the first leather companies established in Milwaukee and by the 1870s one of the largest. It was added to the National Register of Historic Places in 2005.

== History ==
Leather-making in the mid-1800s required animal skins, of course. It also required tanning agents, which could be extracted from the bark of oak, chestnut, and hemlock trees. And it required water for washing away the waste and for transportation. Northern Wisconsin had vast stands of hemlock, the Midwest produced skins, and the Milwaukee River supplied water for washing and access to the Great Lakes for transportation. The first tannery in Milwaukee was started by Daniel Phelps in 1842.

Out in central New York state, Rufus Allen, Sr. had established a tannery in Cazenovia by 1809. By the 1840s the tanning bark out there was exhausted, so the family moved their tannery west to Milwaukee. In 1846, Rufus's son William and Edward P. Allis opened the Empire Leather Store at 149 East Water Street in Milwaukee, describing their business as "wholesale and retail dealers in sole and upper leather of every description, including harness leather, bridle skirting, linings, and findings." By 1850 the firm's name was "Wisconsin Leather Company."

In 1850 the company also bought 1,200 acres of hemlock in Manitowoc County and set up a tannery for upper-leather at Two Rivers. Supplies were shipped to it from Milwaukee and finished leathers were shipped back to Milwaukee. The Two Rivers tannery had 134 tanning vats on the ground floor and drying and storage on the second floor. In 1850-51 it was considered the largest in the Midwest, requiring 7,000 tons of tanbark and processing 60,000 hides.

In 1870 the company built another tannery - this one for upper and harness leather - in the Kinnickinnick basin, which included a receiving building, a beam house, tanning vats, an engine house, a grinding and leeching house, and a finishing building. It was said to be the largest tannery of its kind in the country at that time. By 1872 Wisconsin Leather was one of the largest tanners in the country.

In 1874 Wisconsin Leather decided to move the store and offices to Milwaukee. Edward Townsend Mix designed the building that is the topic of this article on Huron Street - a 3-story cream brick building with Italianate styling evident in the hood moulds over the windows and the pilasters at the corners. The top is capped with a cornice with a pediment in the center. The storefront with its cast iron columns was probably added around 1890 to replace a simpler original.

The company was finally incorporated in 1881. Wisconsin Leather's tannery at Two Rivers closed in 1887, due to the dwindling supply of tanbark there, and in the same year the company failed financially. By 1888 the company had relocated its offices and production had shrunk to $250,000, with 100 employees. In 1889 the remains of Wisconsin Leather were bought by competitor Pfister and Vogel. Wisconsin Leather's failure may have been due to old-fashioned business practices. It was not due to dwindling demand for leather, since the leather industry in Milwaukee continued for another 30 years - peaking during World War I.

Charles L. Kiewert bought the building on Huron Street in 1885, and sold brewing and bottling supplies there until 1920.
