= Richard Thieme =

American technology commentator (born 1944)

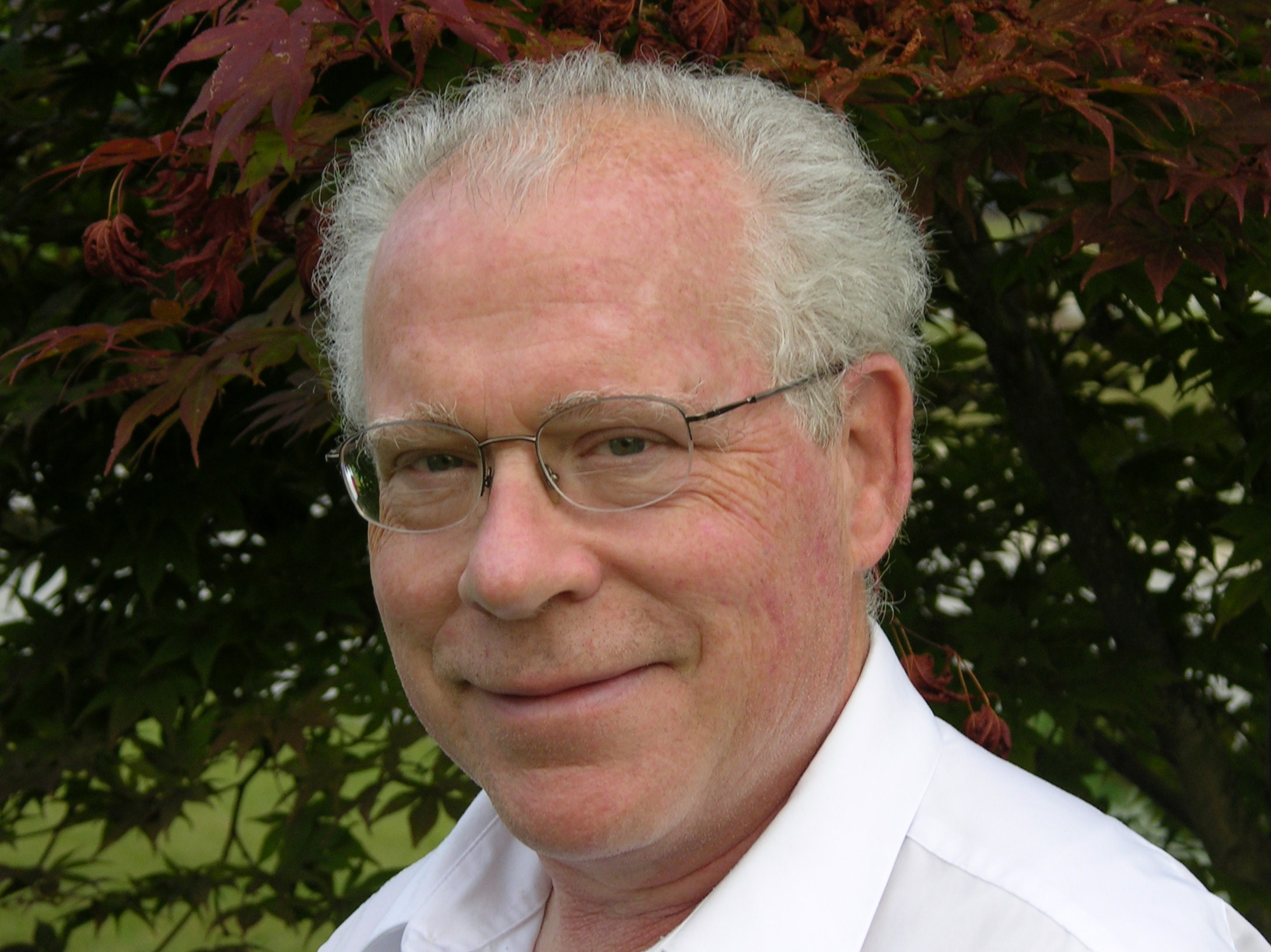
- Richard Thieme, 2004
- Born: 1944 (age 81–82); Chicago
- Other name: Richard F. Thieme
- Occupations: Ex-Episcopal priest, commentator on technology and culture

Richard Thieme (born 1944), is a former priest who became a commentator on technology and culture, founding the consulting firm ThiemeWorks. He is the author of the syndicated column "Islands in the Clickstream", which was turned into a book of the same name in 2004. In 2010 he published a book of short stories, Mind Games, and in 2012 he contributed to the peer-reviewed academic work, UFOs and Government, a Historical Inquiry.

== Biography ==
=== Early life and academic career ===
Thieme was born in Chicago, with one of his parents Christian and one Jewish, and one older brother, the folksinger Art Thieme. Raised Jewish, Thieme was confirmed as a young man in a Reform synagogue, and attended Lake View High School, graduating in 1961. As a teenager he began writing science fiction, with his first story, "Pleasant Journey", published by John W. Campbell in Analog science fiction magazine in 1963, when Thieme was 19. Thieme studied English literature at Northwestern University, graduating Phi Beta Kappa and receiving his B.A. in 1965, and also marrying and starting a family. In 1967, he earned an M.A. in English at the University of Chicago. For the next five years he taught literature at the University of Illinois - Chicago Circle campus, after which he moved to England for two years. There, at age 30, he converted to the Anglican church.

=== Episcopal priest ===
When Thieme and his wife returned to the United States in the 1970s, they moved to Evanston, Illinois, where Thieme attended Seabury-Western Theological Seminary to earn his Masters of Divinity degree, and he became an Episcopal priest. His wife Anne was ordained in May 1978, the first woman to be ordained an Episcopal priest in Utah. The Thiemes were co-rectors at St. James Episcopal Church in Midvale, Utah, but divorced in 1981. Richard remained as rector in the parish until 1984, then transferred to become rector at the Holy Innocents church in Hawaii (1984–1987), and St. Paul's Episcopal Church in Milwaukee (1987–1993). He married his second (and current) wife Shirley in 1983, merging their respective families to have a total of seven children.

=== Technology commentator and author ===
In the early 1980s Thieme became acquainted with computers, at first interested in how they could apply to spirituality and religious organizations. While still in the priesthood, he began writing about technology and culture, including the spiritual dimension of technology, for example in his essay "Computer applications for spirituality, the transformation of religious experience." In 1993 Thieme left the priesthood to pursue a full-time career of professional speaking and writing, founding his own company, LifeWorks (changed in 1996 to ThiemeWorks), and working with clients such as Arthur Andersen, Allstate Insurance, General Electric, the National Security Agency, the FBI, Los Alamos Laboratory, Medtronic, Microsoft, and the United States Department of the Treasury.

Thieme has keynoted security conferences in fifteen countries, and has spoken at DEF CON, the premiere hacker conference in Las Vegas, for 26 straight years. He was honored as the first "Uber Contributor" to Def Con in 2022.

In the mid-1990s, Thieme started writing a monthly online column, "Islands in the Clickstream". It began as emails and then grew into a mailing list, website, and syndicated column. Thieme gained a reputation as an "online pundit of hacker culture."

In 2010, Thieme published Mind Games, which collected the various works of fiction he'd published in different locations into one place. In 2012, he contributed to the non-fiction book UFOs and Government: A Historical Inquiry, which examines the government's treatment of UFO reports, going back to World War II. The book was praised by the magazine Choice: Current Reviews for Academic Libraries for good sourcing, and recommended as "a useful resource for the study of a controversial topic".

== Works ==
Nonfiction books

- Islands in the Clickstream
- (contributor) UFOs and Government: A Historical Inquiry

Fiction books

- Mind Games
- FOAM
- Mobius: A Memoir
- The Mobius Vector: The Long Road Home
- Mobius: Out of Time
