= First Baptist Church (Waukesha, Wisconsin) =

Historic church in Wisconsin, United States

- U.S. National Register of Historic Places
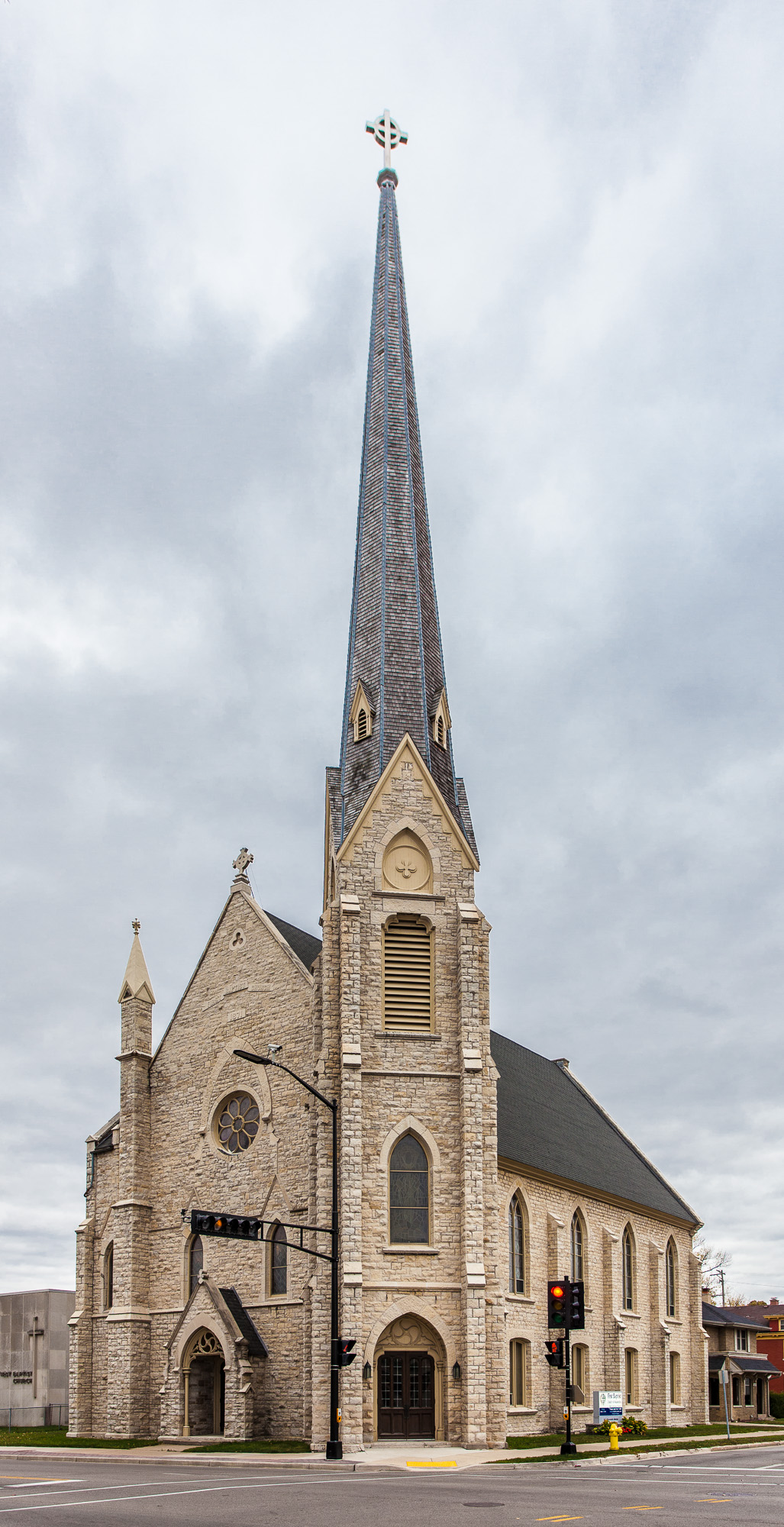

- Location within Wisconsin Location within the United States
- Location: 247 Wisconsin Ave., Waukesha, Wisconsin
- Coordinates: 43°0′34″N 88°13′52″W
- Area: less than one acre
- Built: 1922
- Architect: E. Townsend Mix; Hengels, H. C.
- Architectural style: Gothic
- MPS: Waukesha MRA
- NRHP reference No.: 83004334
- Added to NRHP: October 28, 1983

First Baptist Church is an American Baptist Church in Waukesha, Wisconsin. The church was designed by E. Townsend Mix in the Gothic architecture style and was built in 1872. It was added to the National Register of Historic Places on October 28, 1983, for its architectural significance.

Baptists first met in Waukesha in 1836 in Nathaniel Walton's cabin. In 1844 they built their first dedicated church building on the site of this later church. In 1871 it was moved to make space for this building.

Mix designed a rectangular main block with walls of rock-faced stone, pointed-arch windows, and buttresses lining the walls. On the front corner stands a tall tower and steeple set diagonally. The main entrance is through that corner tower. A rose window decorates the end with the tower.
