= First Congregational Church (Ripon, Wisconsin) =

Historic church in Wisconsin, United States

- U.S. National Register of Historic Places
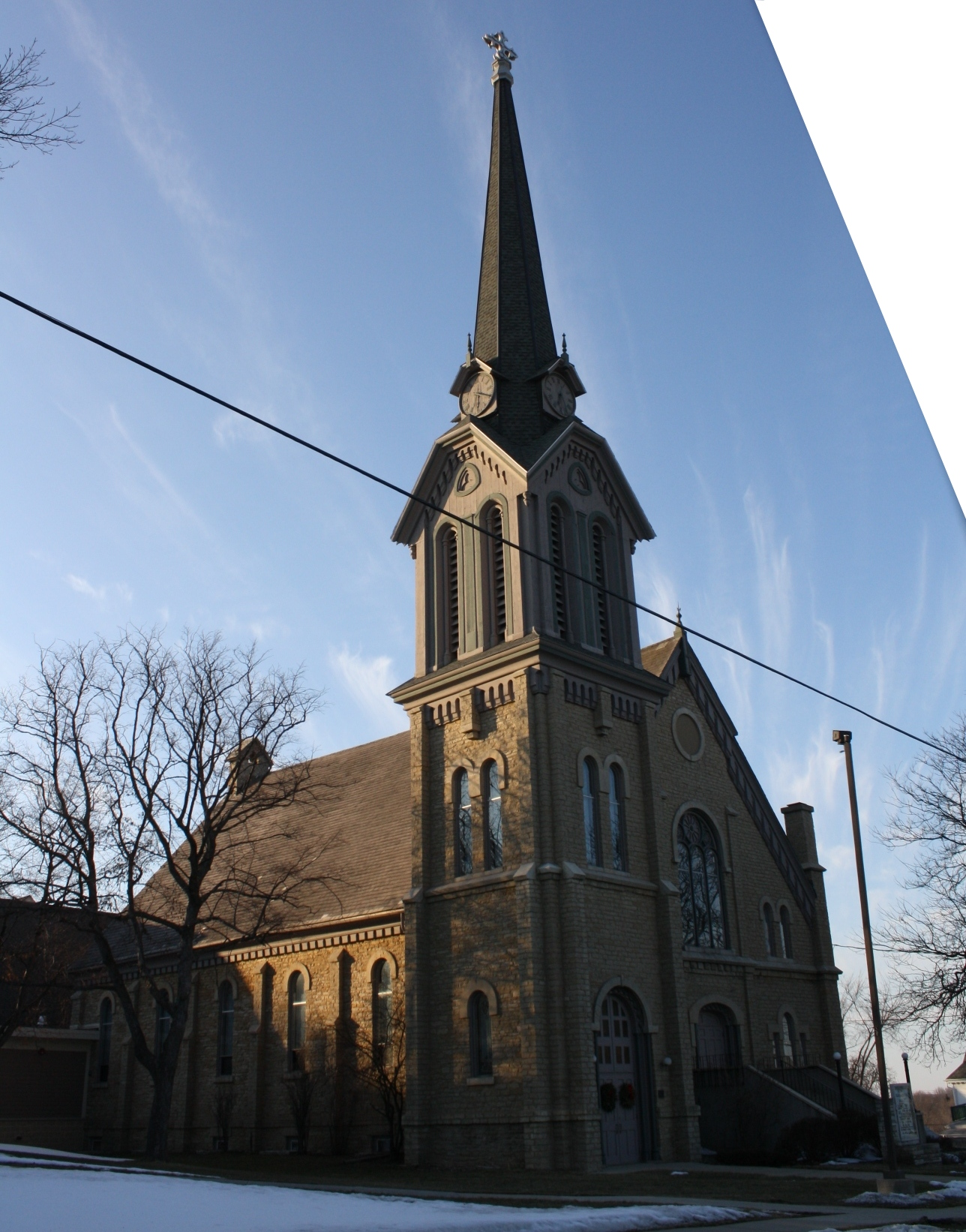

- Location within Wisconsin Location within the United States
- Location: 220 Ransom St., Ripon, Wisconsin
- Coordinates: 43°50′42″N 88°50′26″W
- Area: 0.7 acres (0.28 ha)
- Built: 1868
- Architect: E. Townsend Mix
- Architectural style: Romanesque, Romanesque Revival
- NRHP reference No.: 79000077
- Added to NRHP: September 4, 1979

First Congregational Church is located in Ripon, Wisconsin. The church was built in the Romanesque Revival architecture style between 1865 and 1868. It was designed by E. Townsend Mix. On September 4, 1979, it was added to the National Register of Historic Places for its architectural significance.
