= Immanuel Presbyterian Church (Milwaukee, Wisconsin) =

Historic church in Wisconsin, United States

- U.S. National Register of Historic Places
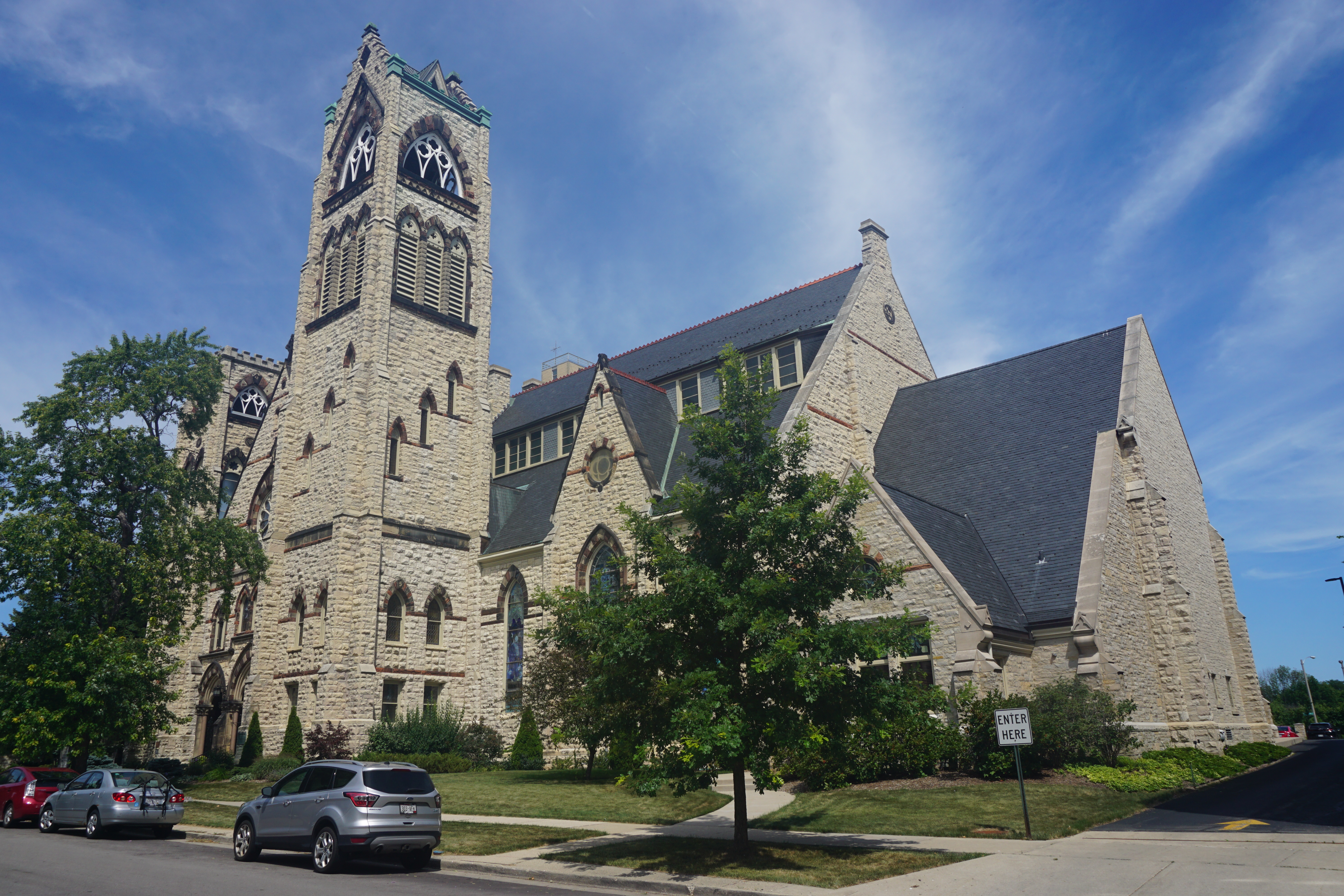
- Immanuel Presbyterian Church

- Location within Wisconsin Location within the United States
- Location: 1100 N. Astor St. Milwaukee, Wisconsin
- Coordinates: 43°2′41″N 87°53′58″W
- Area: 1 acre (0.40 ha)
- Built: 1875
- Architect: Edward Townsend Mix
- Architectural style: High Victorian Gothic
- NRHP reference No.: 74000104
- Added to NRHP: December 27, 1974

Immanuel Presbyterian Church is a High Victorian Gothic-styled church built 1873–75 in Milwaukee, Wisconsin. In 1974 it was added to the National Register of Historic Places. Additionally, it was designated a landmark by the Milwaukee Landmarks Commission in 1969.

Immanuel congregation was formed in 1870, a merger of First Presbyterian Church and North Presbyterian Church, which were founded in 1837 and 1849. By 1873 the merged congregation was ready to build a new church building.

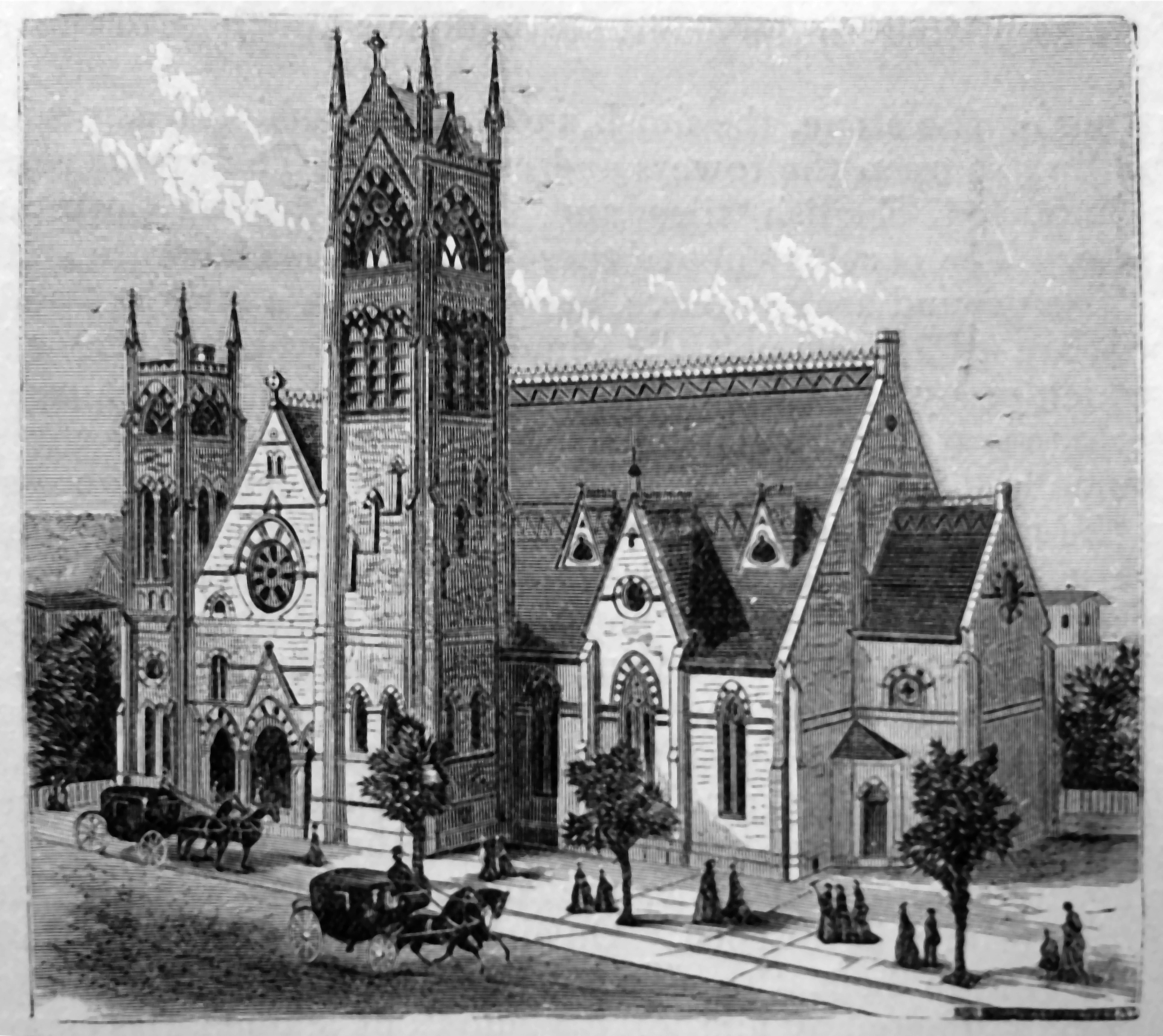

The new building was dedicated in 1875, grand and exuberant, with asymmetric square towers, various groupings of lancet windows, and rose windows. The exterior was clad in carefully laid ashlar Wauwatosa limestone, with openings trimmed in red-orange and gray sandstone. The building was designed by E. Townsend Mix, Milwaukee's prominent architect at the time. The vertical emphasis seen in the towers and upward-pointing windows are characteristics of Gothic style, and the use of multiple colors makes it High Victorian Gothic. Inside, the original auditorium was "as bold and colorful as the exterior," with a nave arcade, a vaulted aisle, and "sumptuous ornament."

Then on December 31, 1887, during a snowstorm in the night after a choir performed Handel's Messiah, a fire started. It gutted the nave and chancel, collapsed the roof, and damaged the north wing, leaving only the limestone walls. When the auditorium was rebuilt in 1888 and 1889, it was simplified.

Art-glass windows designed by Louis Comfort Tiffany and Co. were added around 1900. In 1937-38 the building was remodeled, with changes to the main vestibule, the chapel, the north wing parlor, and the gallery at the north end of the nave. In 1957-58 the chancel was expanded, the pastor's study and custodian's workshop were added on the south, the pews and pulpit were replaced, and the old wood trim in the auditorium was bleached to match the new pews.
