= Globe Building (Saint Paul) =

Coordinates: 44.945520°N 93.092431°W

- Interactive map of the Globe Building area

General information
- Status: Demolished
- Type: Office
- Location: 4th and Cedar Streets, Saint Paul, Minnesota, United States
- Completed: 1887 (139 years ago)
- Destroyed: 1959 (67 years ago)

Technical details
- Floor count: 10

Design and construction
- Architect: E. Townsend Mix

The Globe Building was a ten-story office building located in the American city of Saint Paul, Minnesota. Located in Downtown Saint Paul, it was built to serve as the headquarters of the Saint Paul Globe newspaper.

Designed by E. Townsend Mix, the building was designed in an eclectic Romanesque Revival style topped by an open-air tower that visitors could access and look out from. At the time it was built, it was the tallest office building in Saint Paul.

After the Saint Paul Globe folded in 1905, the building continued on as a general office building, undergoing several rounds of renovations (including the removal of its trademark tower in 1950). In 1959, the building was demolished to make way for the Degree of Honor Building which opened in 1961.
