= A. H. Allyn House =

Historic house in Wisconsin, United States

- U.S. National Register of Historic Places
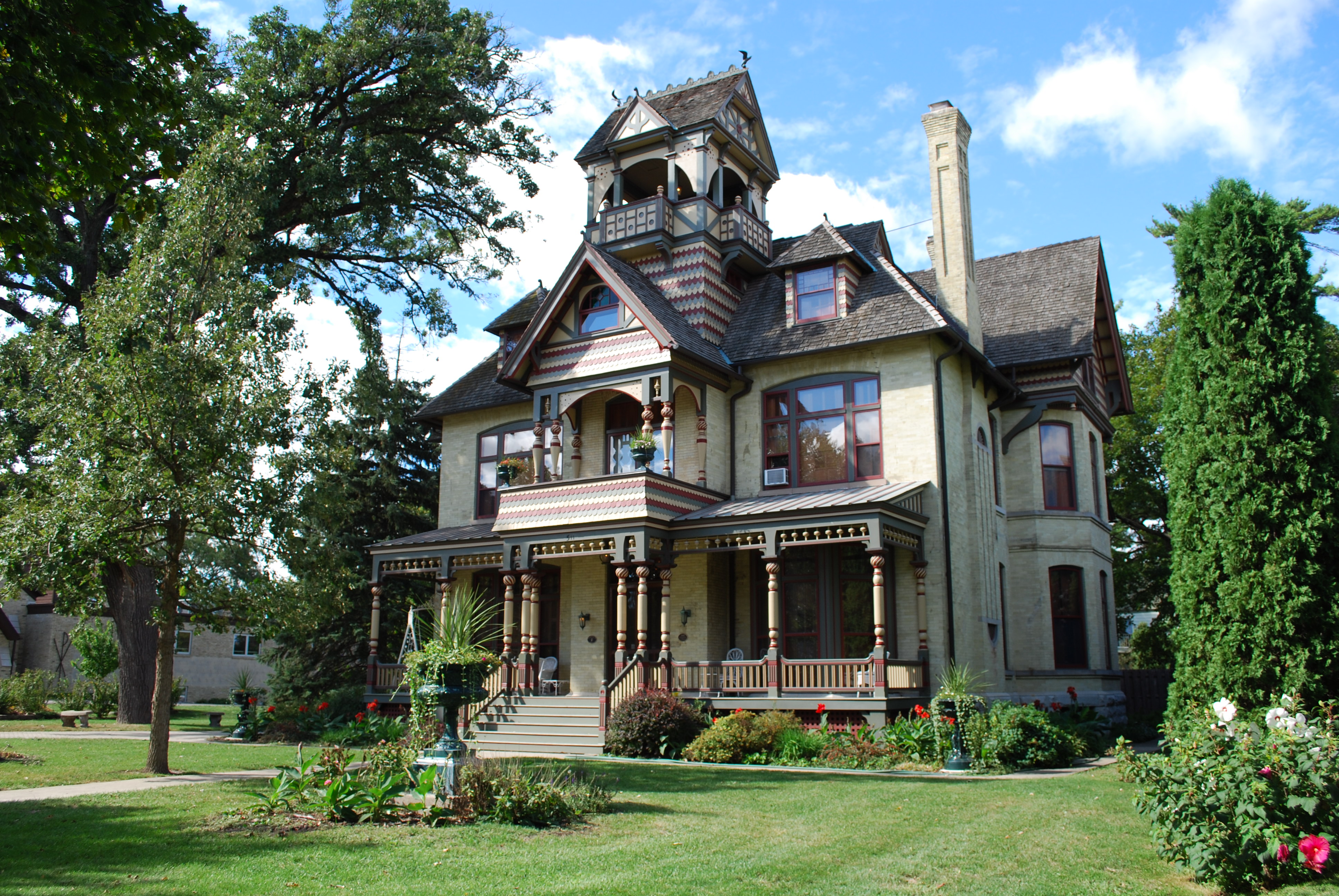
- A. H. Allyn House

- Location within Wisconsin Location within the United States
- Location: 511 E. Walworth Ave. Delavan, Wisconsin
- Coordinates: 42°38′10″N 88°38′29″W
- Built: 1885
- Architect: E. Townsend Mix
- Architectural style: Queen Anne
- NRHP reference No.: 85001950
- Added to NRHP: September 5, 1985

The A. H. Allyn House is a historic house located at 511 East Walworth Avenue in Delavan, Wisconsin. It was added to the National Register of Historic Places in 1985 and the State Register of Historic Places in 1989.

== History ==
Constructed in 1885 in the Queen Anne style, the 3-story house was originally built for Alexander Allyn and his family. When his wife died in 1939, 26 years after his own death in 1913, she left the house to her step-daughter Esther, who used it sparingly, only during family reunions.

In 1948, upon Esther's death, she left it her daughter Ruth. The house was kept for two years, and in that time all the external wooden parts were removed as an assumedly cheaper solution to expensive repairs that were needed. After this, the house was sold off to the city of Delavan for use as a municipal building.

However, the city decided to sell it for use as a nursing home, which closed in 1966 due to the introduction of stricter laws for nursing homes. Three years later, it became a furniture store before closing again in 1983. The next year, in 1984, the house was bought by Joe Johnson and Ron Markwell, who rebuilt the house to how it was originally built in 1885.
