= Grand Avenue Congregational Church =

Historic church in Wisconsin, United States

- U.S. National Register of Historic Places
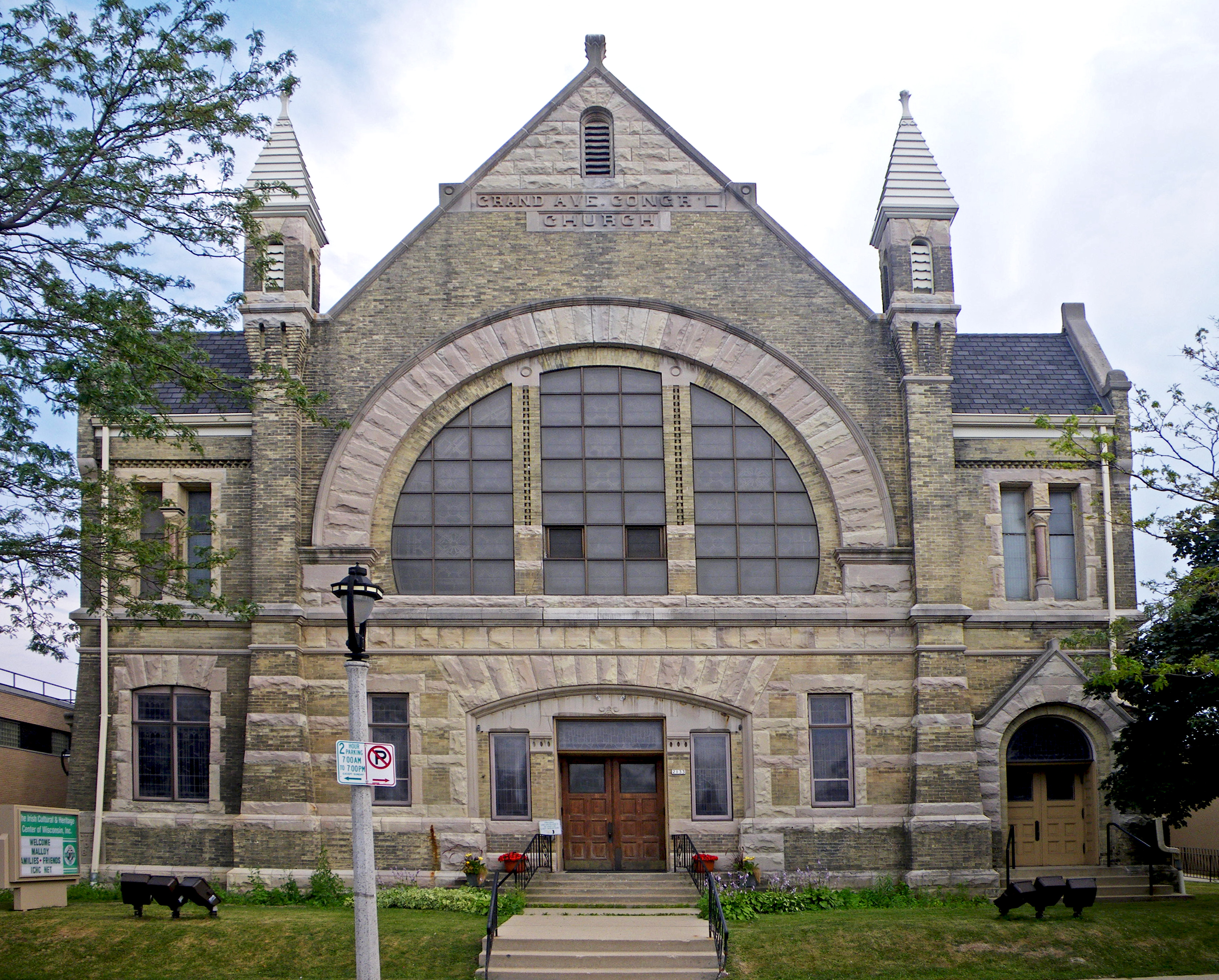
- Grand Avenue Congregational Church
- Location: 2133 W. Wisconsin Ave. Milwaukee, Wisconsin
- Coordinates: 43.03836°N 87.94046°W
- Built: 1887-1888
- Architect: E. Townsend Mix
- Architectural style: Romanesque Revival
- NRHP reference No.: 86000110
- Added to NRHP: January 16, 1986

The Grand Avenue Congregational Church is a historic Romanesque Revival church built in 1888 in Milwaukee, Wisconsin. It was added to the National Register of Historic Places in 1986.

The congregation that became Grand Avenue Congregational split off in 1847 from First Presbyterian and First Congregational, calling itself Free Congregational. Abolition of slavery was a keen interest of the congregation at that time, along with education of women and temperance. The congregation first met in a rented building downtown on Broadway, moved to Spring Street in 1852, and Grand Avenue in 1881. In 1887 they decided to move again, to build at the current location on Wisconsin Ave.

The congregation hired master architect E. Townsend Mix to design their new church. Mix's design is Romanesque Revival, with round arches and rough-cut stone contrasting with smooth brick and glass. Most of the rough stone is lower, to give a feel of stability. The floor-plan is in the form of a cross, and the roof-line is complex. However, going against typical Romanesque Revival church buildings, the front is symmetric, without a big dramatic tower on one side. Instead a large Diocletian window rises above the front door, and a small tower rises from each side gable. Inside, the large auditorium seated 1200.

The new church was dedicated in May 1888. The back of the building was expanded in 1907, 1930 and 1935. The 1930 expansion was a choir loft designed by Van Ryn & DeGelleke.

The congregation has a tradition of ecumenism. In 1902 it hosted a joint Thanksgiving service of Christians and Jews. In 1945 it held a joint service with St. Mark's African Methodist Church. In 1957 Martin Luther King Jr. spoke to a packed house about segregation, the importance of peace and love, and finding a solution to racial inequality.

In 1996 the church's building was transferred to the Irish Cultural and Heritage Center. The congregation dissolved the following year.
