= St. Paul's Episcopal Church (Milwaukee, Wisconsin) =

Historic church in Wisconsin, United States

- U.S. National Register of Historic Places
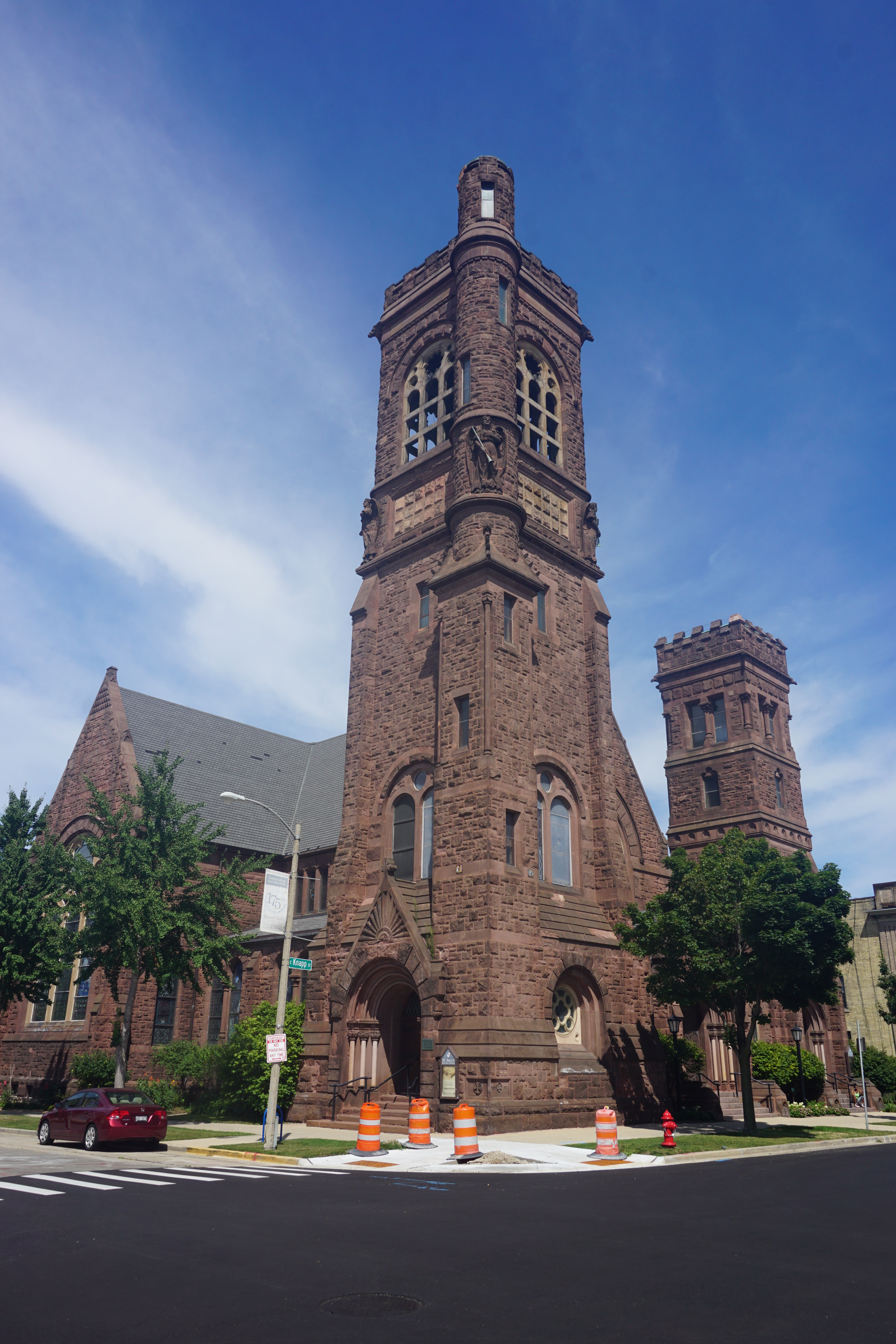
- St. Paul's Episcopal Church

- Location within Wisconsin Location within the United States
- Location: 904 E. Knapp St., Milwaukee, Wisconsin
- Coordinates: 43°02′50.24″N 87°54′2.34″W
- Area: 1 acre (0.40 ha)
- Built: 1890
- Architect: Edward Townsend Mix; Louis Comfort Tiffany
- Architectural style: Romanesque, Richardsonian Romanesque
- NRHP reference No.: 74000110
- Added to NRHP: December 27, 1974

St. Paul's Episcopal Church is a Richardsonian Romanesque-styled church built in 1882 in Milwaukee, Wisconsin, in the Episcopal Diocese of Milwaukee. Noted for its Tiffany windows, it is listed on the National Register of Historic Places and is a designated Milwaukee Landmark.

In 2015, the church reported 330 members; in 2023, it reported 143 members. No membership statistics were reported in 2024 national parochial reports. Average Sunday Attendance (ASA) reported by the church in 2024 was 78 persons. This was a relative decrease from ASA of 121 persons reported in 2015. Plate and pledge financial support reported by the church in 2024 was $449,847.

== Description ==
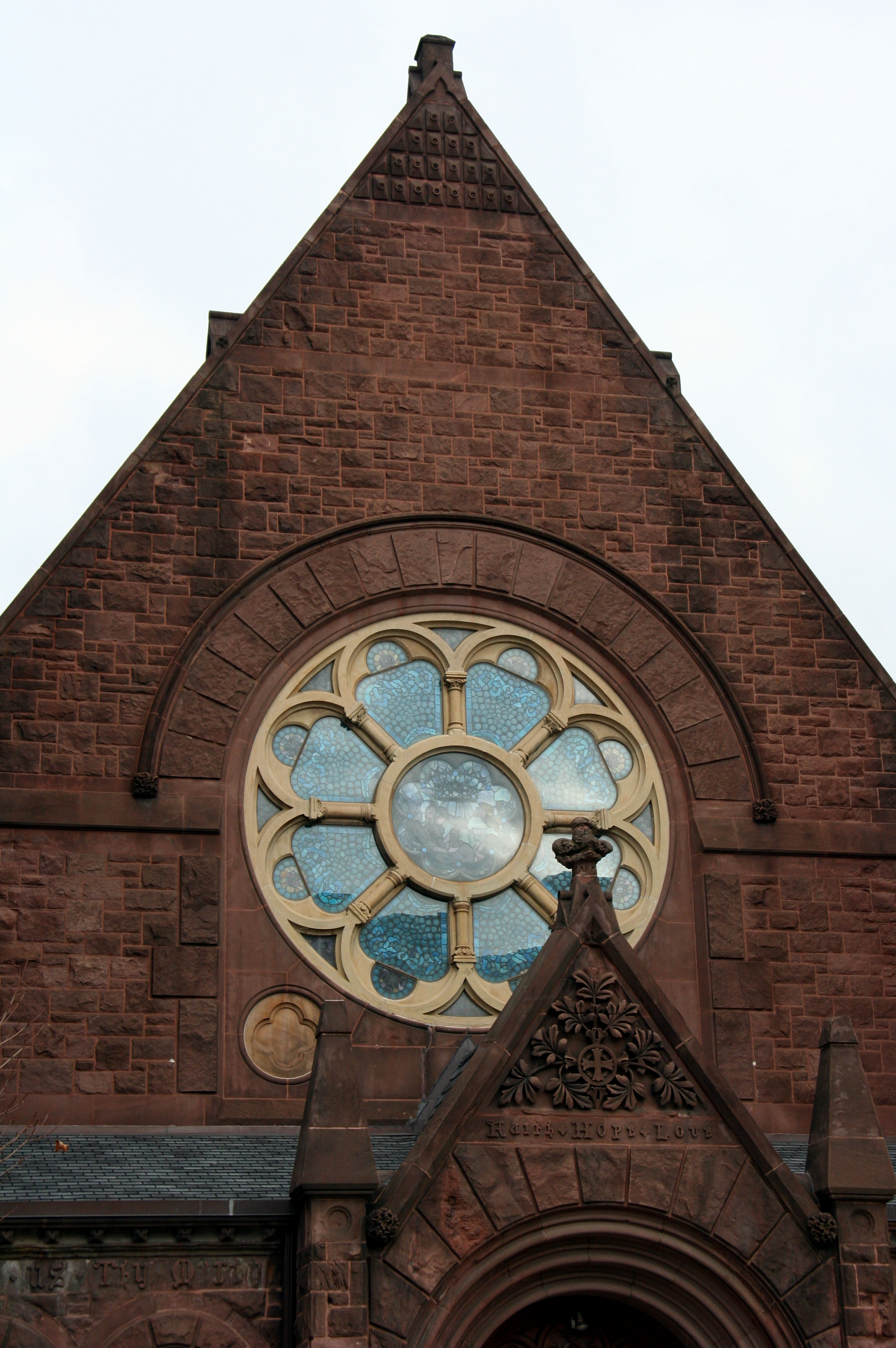
The front of the church

Founded in 1838, St. Paul's parish is the oldest Episcopal parish in Milwaukee and the third established in Wisconsin. It is located in the wealthy downtown east neighborhood of Juneautown. Members included many prominent citizens of the time, which helped the church to become the most influential Episcopal congregation in the state.

The building was designed by local architect Edward Townsend Mix in Romanesque Revival/Richardsonian Romanesque style and built in 1884 using Lake Superior Sandstone, a dark red sandstone found near the Apostle Islands in Lake Superior. It features wrought iron by Master Blacksmith Cyril Colnik.

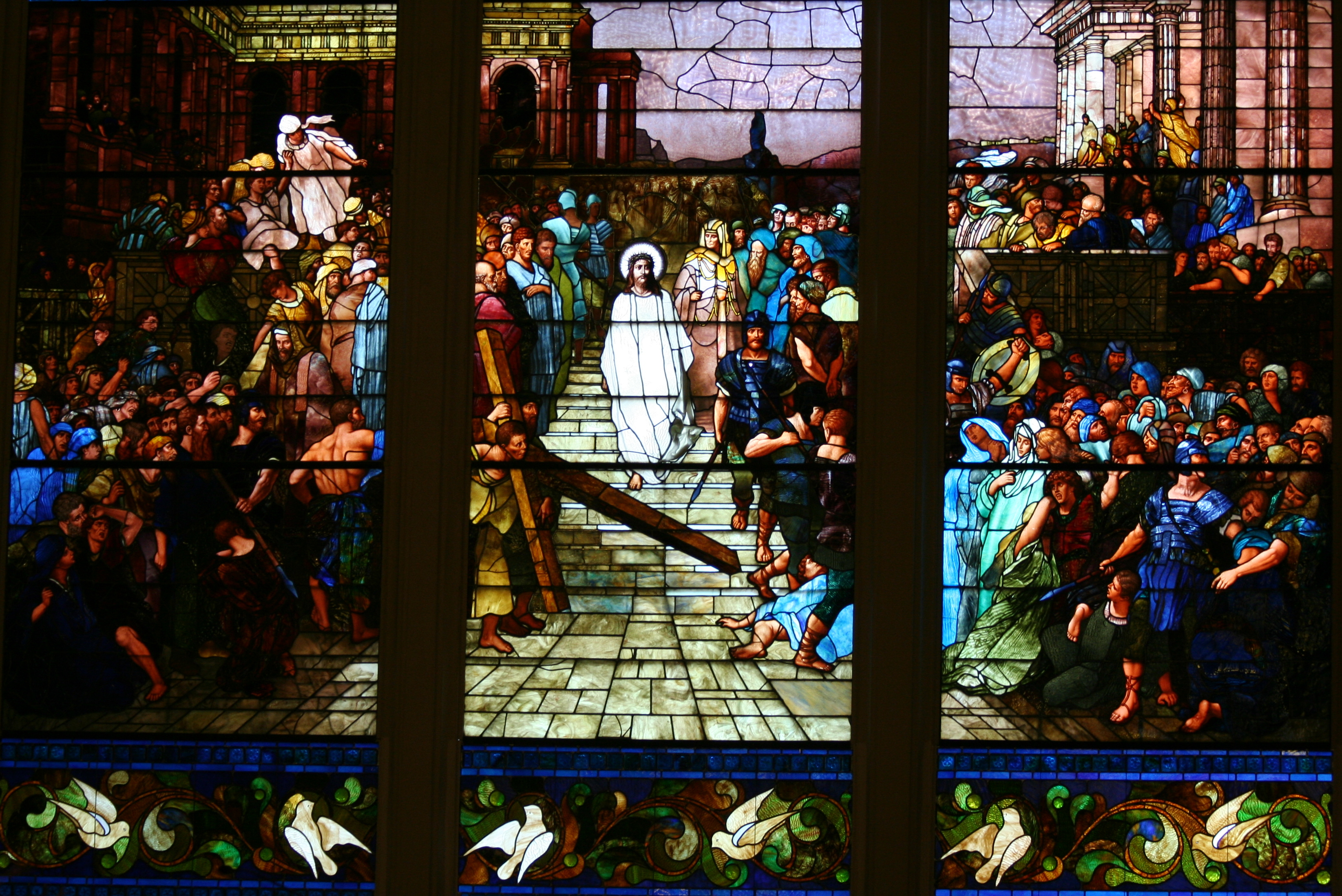
Christ Leaving the Praetorium by Tiffany

St. Paul's Church also has the largest collection of Tiffany stained glass windows in the state. This includes the largest window ever made by Tiffany Studios of New York City. Spanning 30 feet long, 24 feet high and up to two inches thick, it is a copy of Gustave Doré's masterpiece "Christ Leaving the Praetorium."

It is believed that the building closely resembles one which was designed by architect Henry Hobson Richardson, whose plans were published in the Architectural Sketch Book in 1873, but never built.

A committee appointed by the church established Forest Home Cemetery on Milwaukee's south side, the final resting place of many of the city's famed beer barons and social elite. When the land was selected it was located nearly two miles outside of the city limits. At the time this was believed to be far enough from urban development to remain rural.

It was documented by the Historic American Buildings Survey in 1969 and was designated a Milwaukee Landmark in 1972.

== See also ==
- Richard Thieme, priest at St. Paul's who went on to become an author and technology consultant.
