= First Methodist Church (Monroe, Wisconsin) =

Historic church in Wisconsin, United States

- U.S. National Register of Historic Places
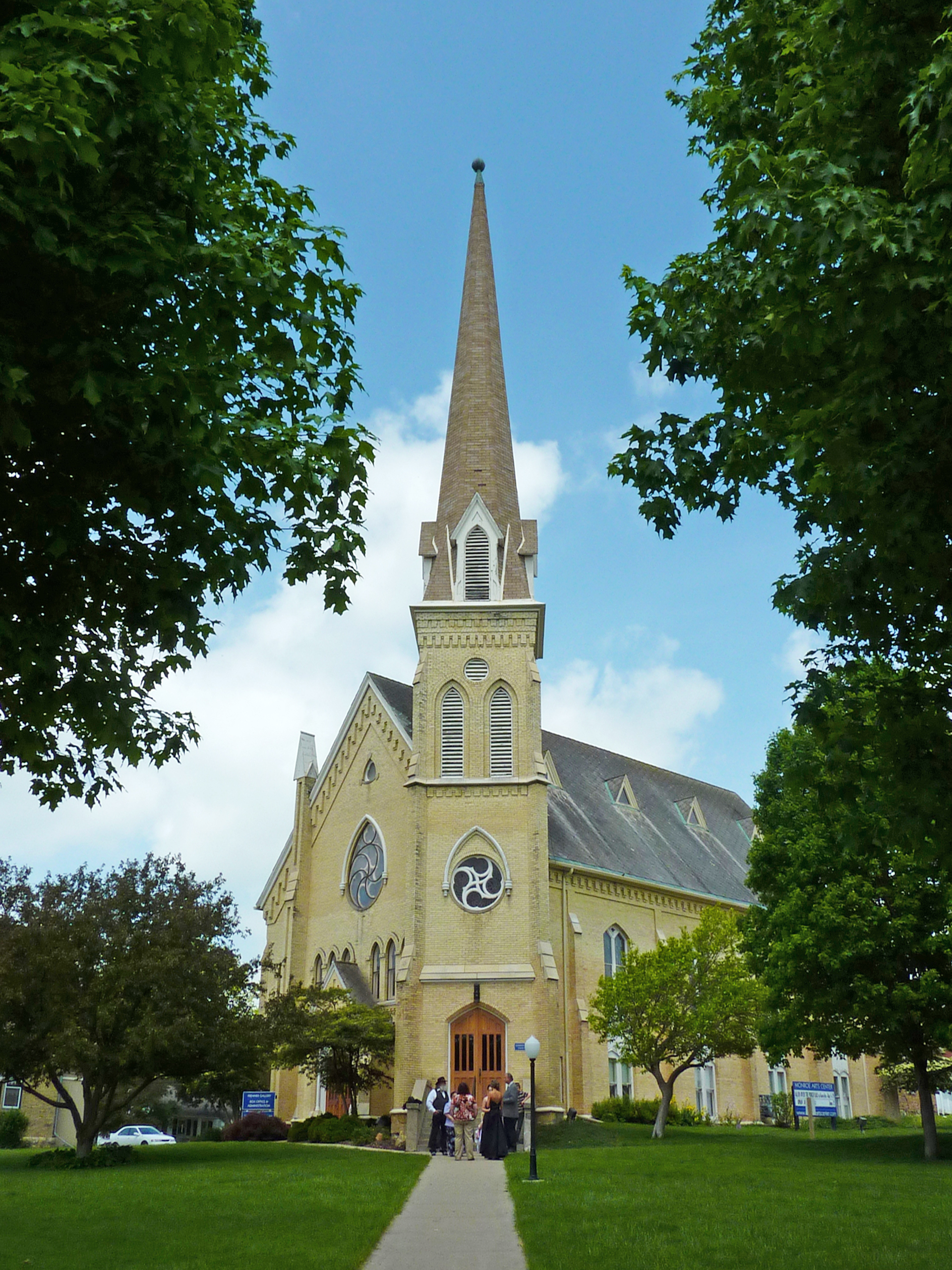

- Location within Wisconsin Location within the United States
- Location: 11th St. and 14th Ave., Monroe, Wisconsin
- Coordinates: 42°36′6″N 89°38′34″W
- Built: 1869-1887
- Architect: E. Townsend Mix
- Architectural style: Late Gothic Revival
- NRHP reference No.: 75000065
- Added to NRHP: February 25, 1975

The First Methodist Church in Monroe, Green County, Wisconsin, now the Monroe Arts Center, is a Gothic Revival edifice designed by the former Wisconsin State Architect E. Townsend Mix of Milwaukee and constructed of Cream City brick. It was commissioned in 1869 by the First Methodist Episcopal congregation of Monroe to replace an earlier church building that dated to 1843. The adjacent parsonage was completed in 1886, and the complete ensemble was finally dedicated in 1887.

With its pointed-arch windows as well as the steeply pitched roof and tall, narrow tower, the church exemplifies the late-Gothic Revival style. The angled corner belfry tower and decorative brickwork are additional hallmarks of Mix's design. Perhaps the most striking feature is the rose window with elaborate tracery on the front facade, composed of teardrop-shaped stained-glass panes.

The building was added to the National Register of Historic Places in 1975.

== Monroe Arts Center ==
In 1976, the non-profit Monroe Arts Center, which was formed to purchase the building, took ownership and opened it to the community for performances and exhibitions.

== Gallery ==
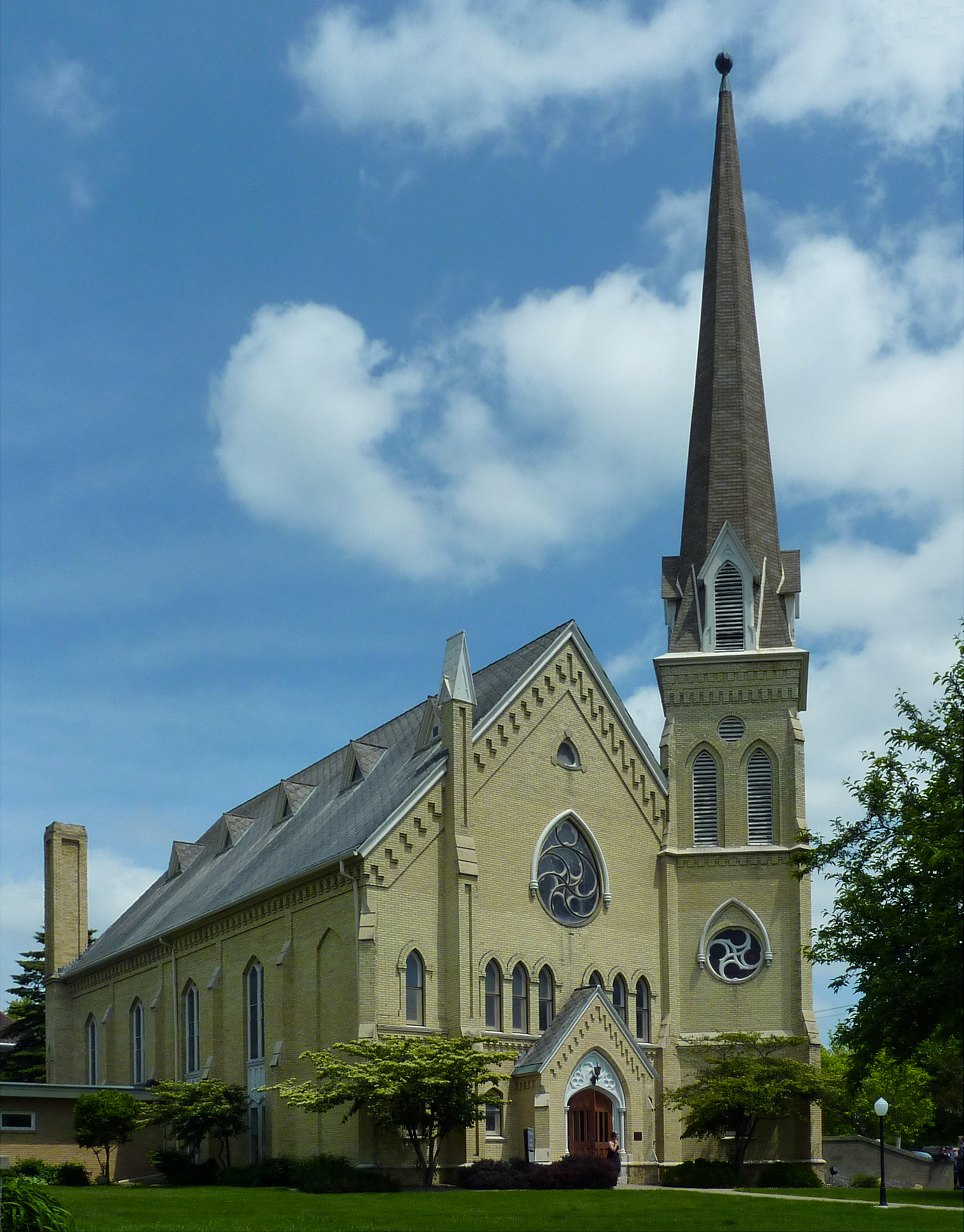
Facade with the rose window

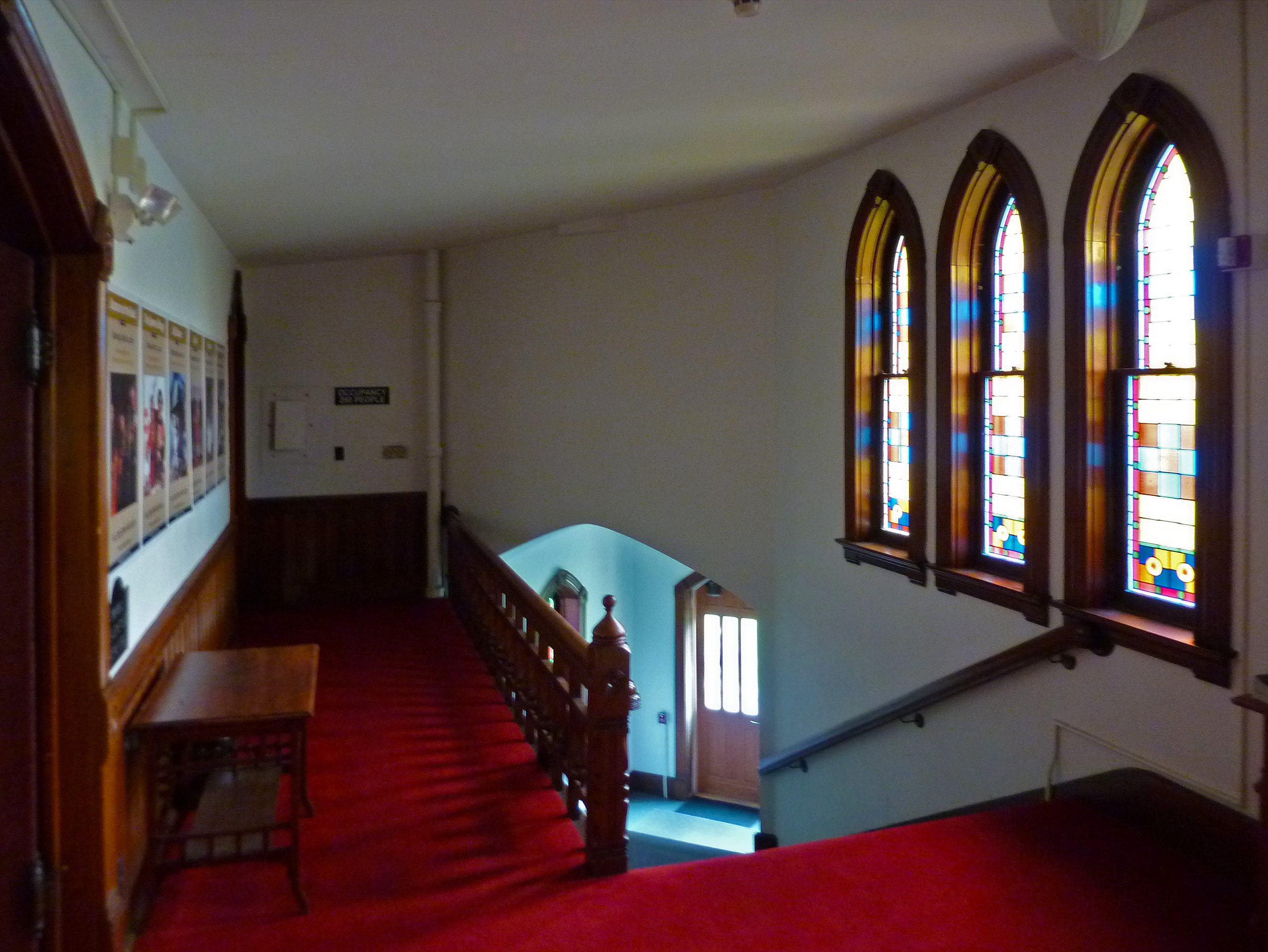
Stairs from the corner tower entrance to the narthex

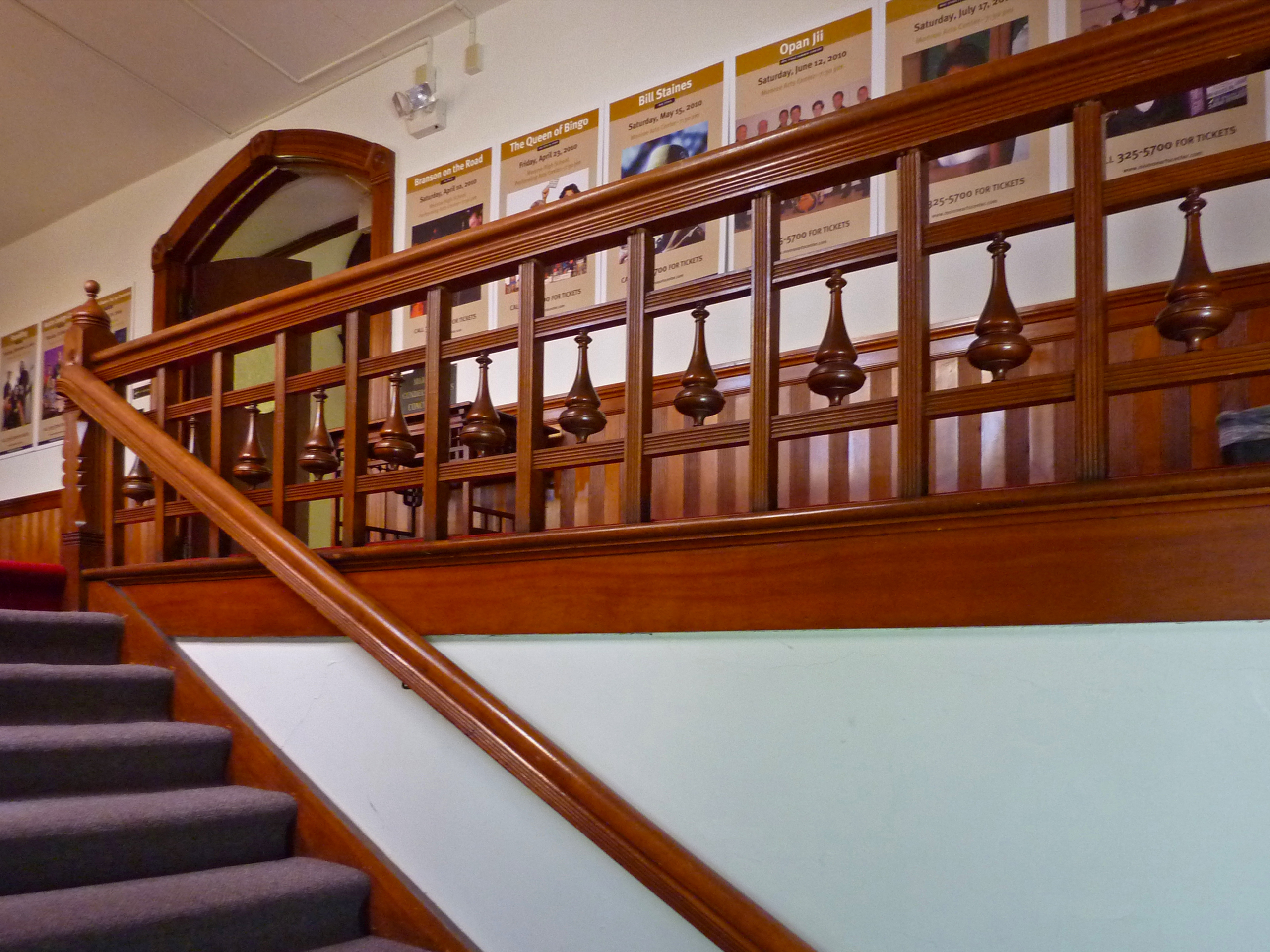
Staircase balustrade in the narthex

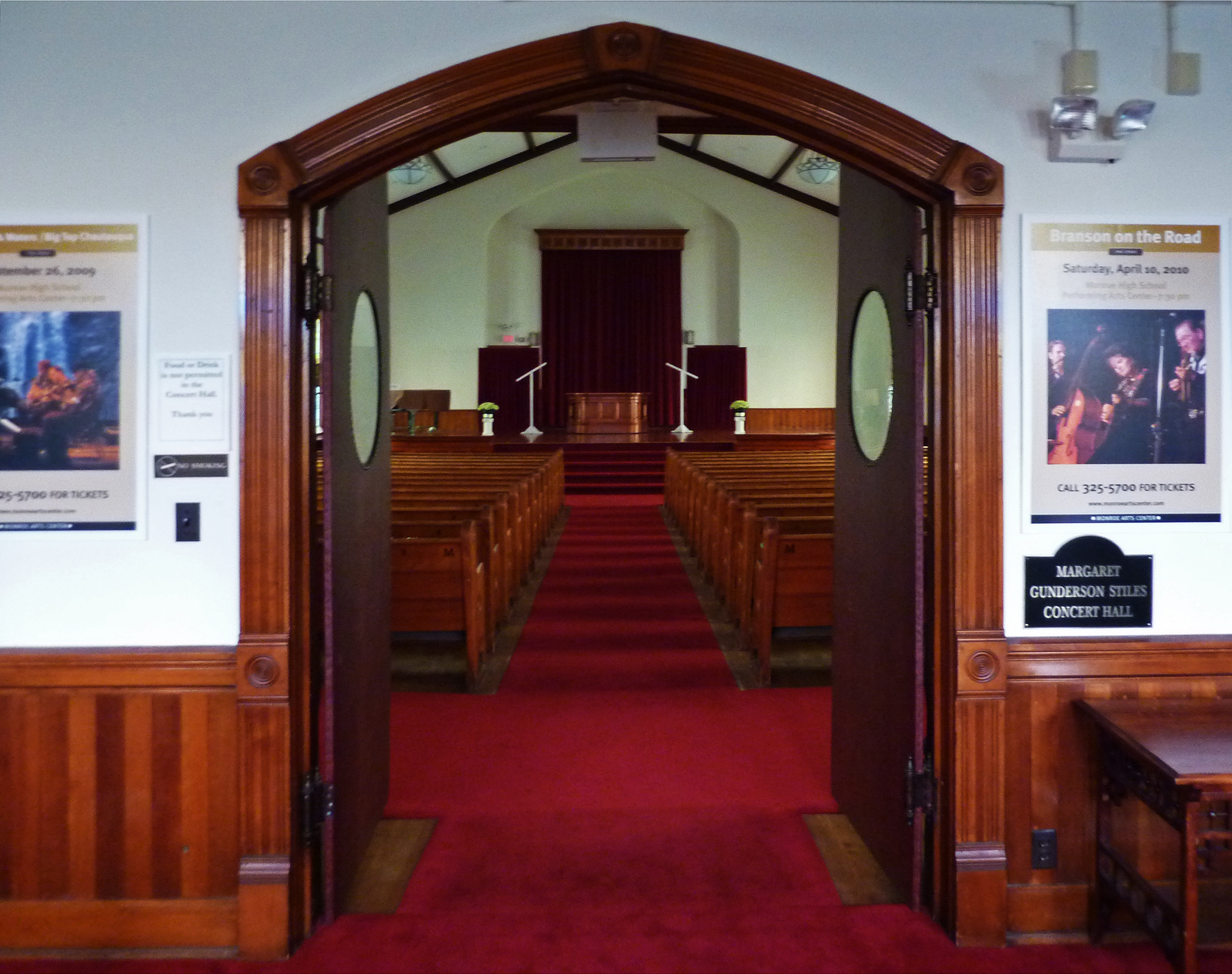
Sanctuary entrance from the narthex

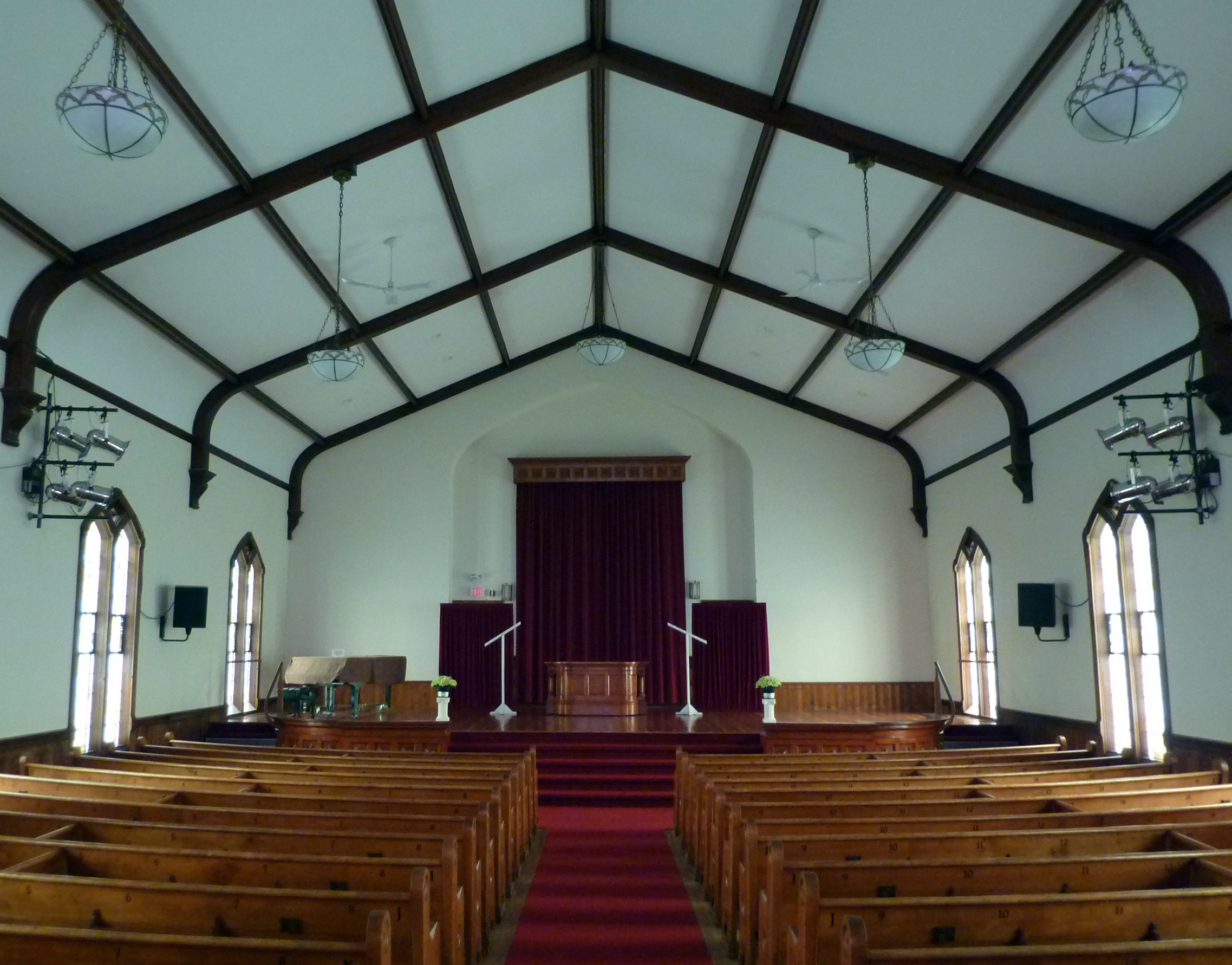
The nave, view toward the altar

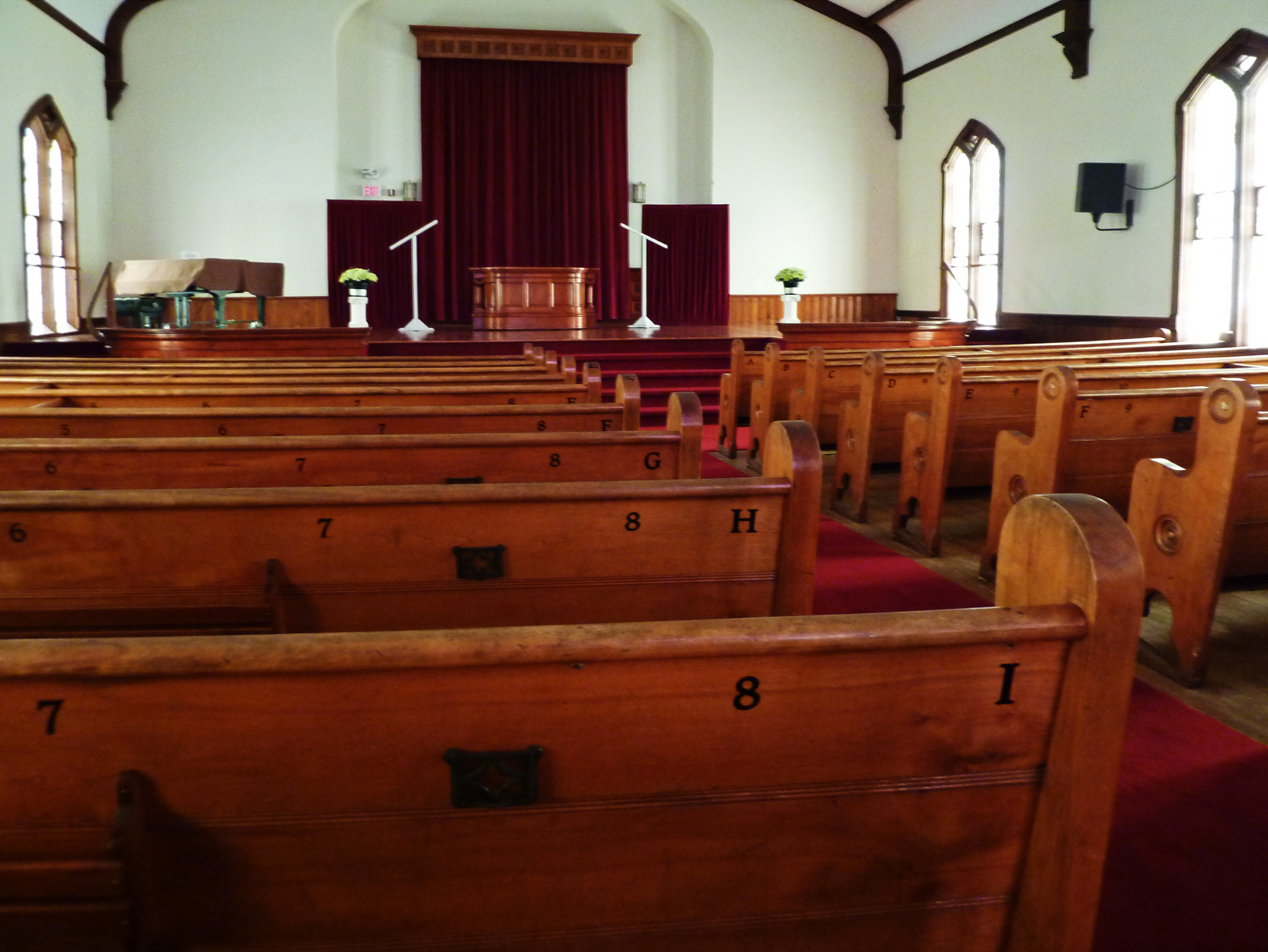
Pews

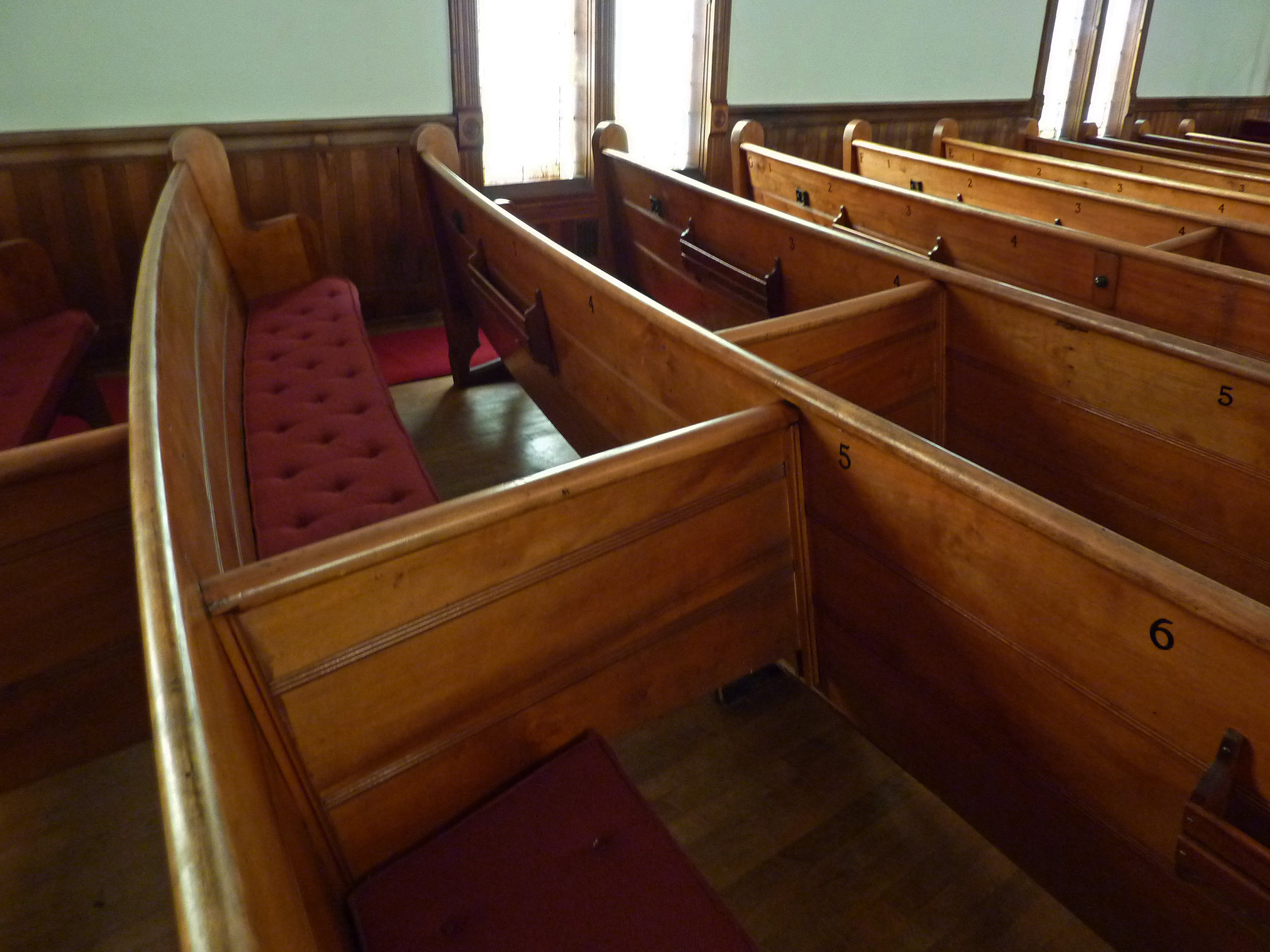
Pew dividers

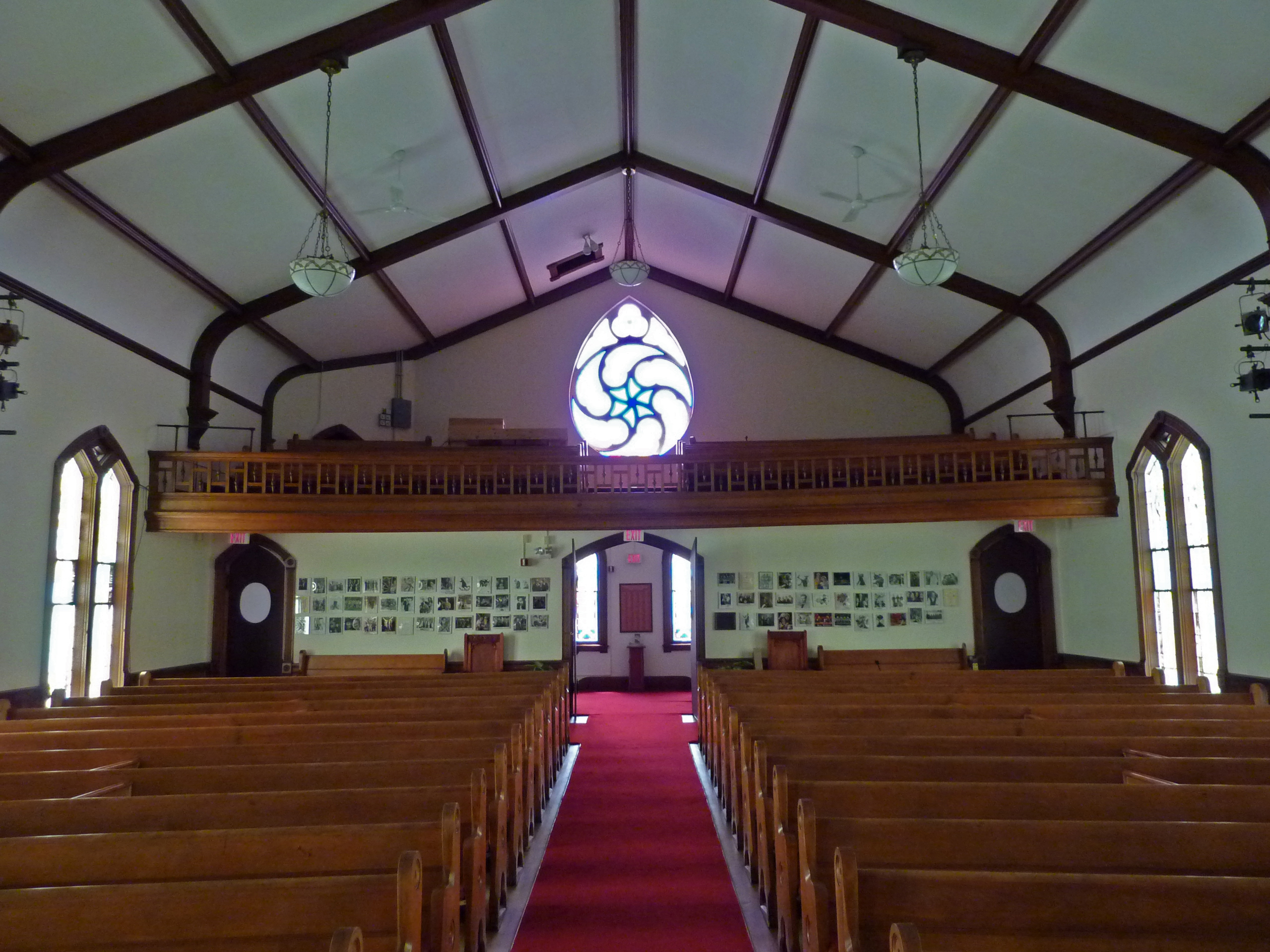
The nave, view toward the rose window

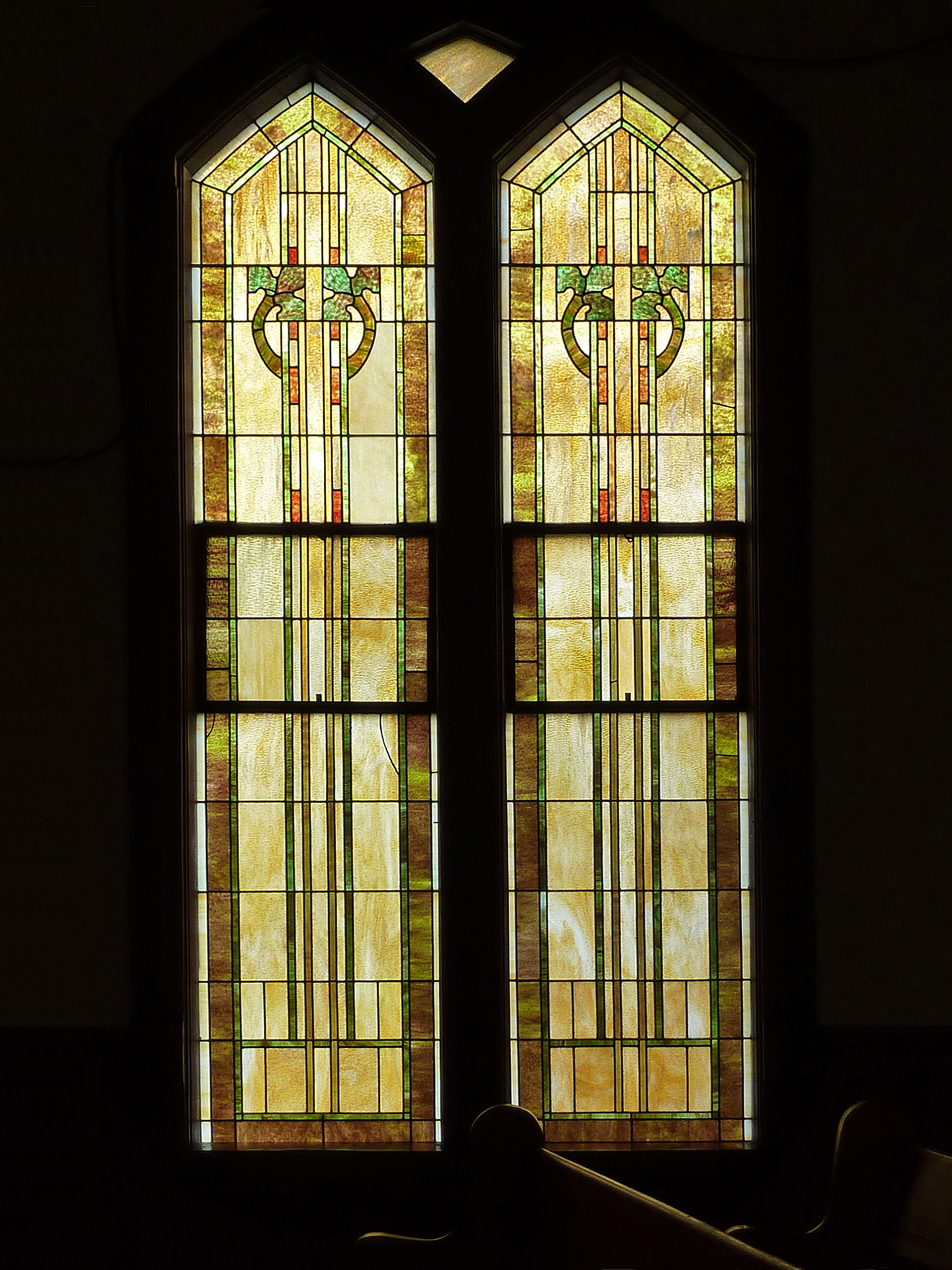
Windows in the nave

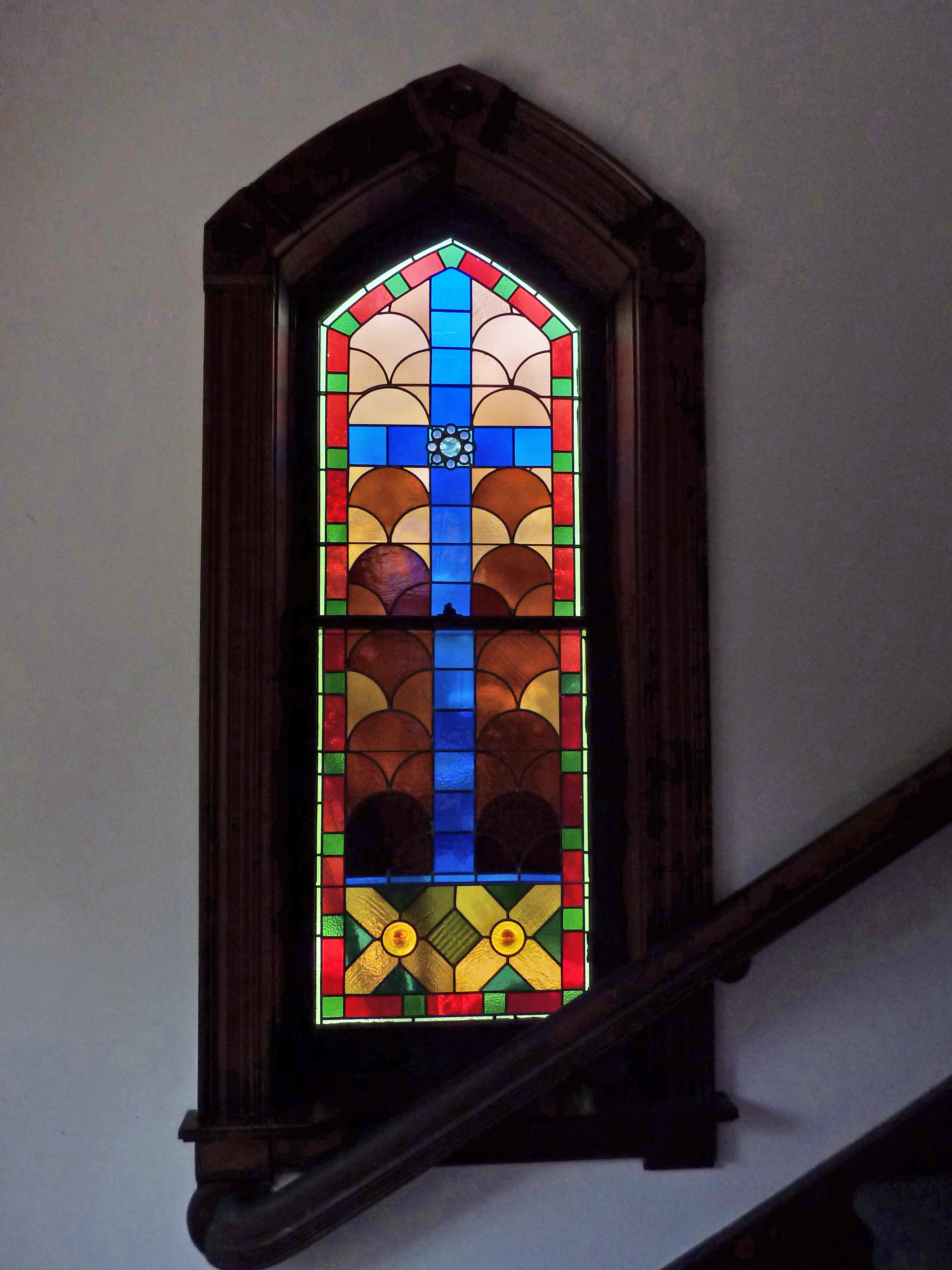
Window in the corner tower

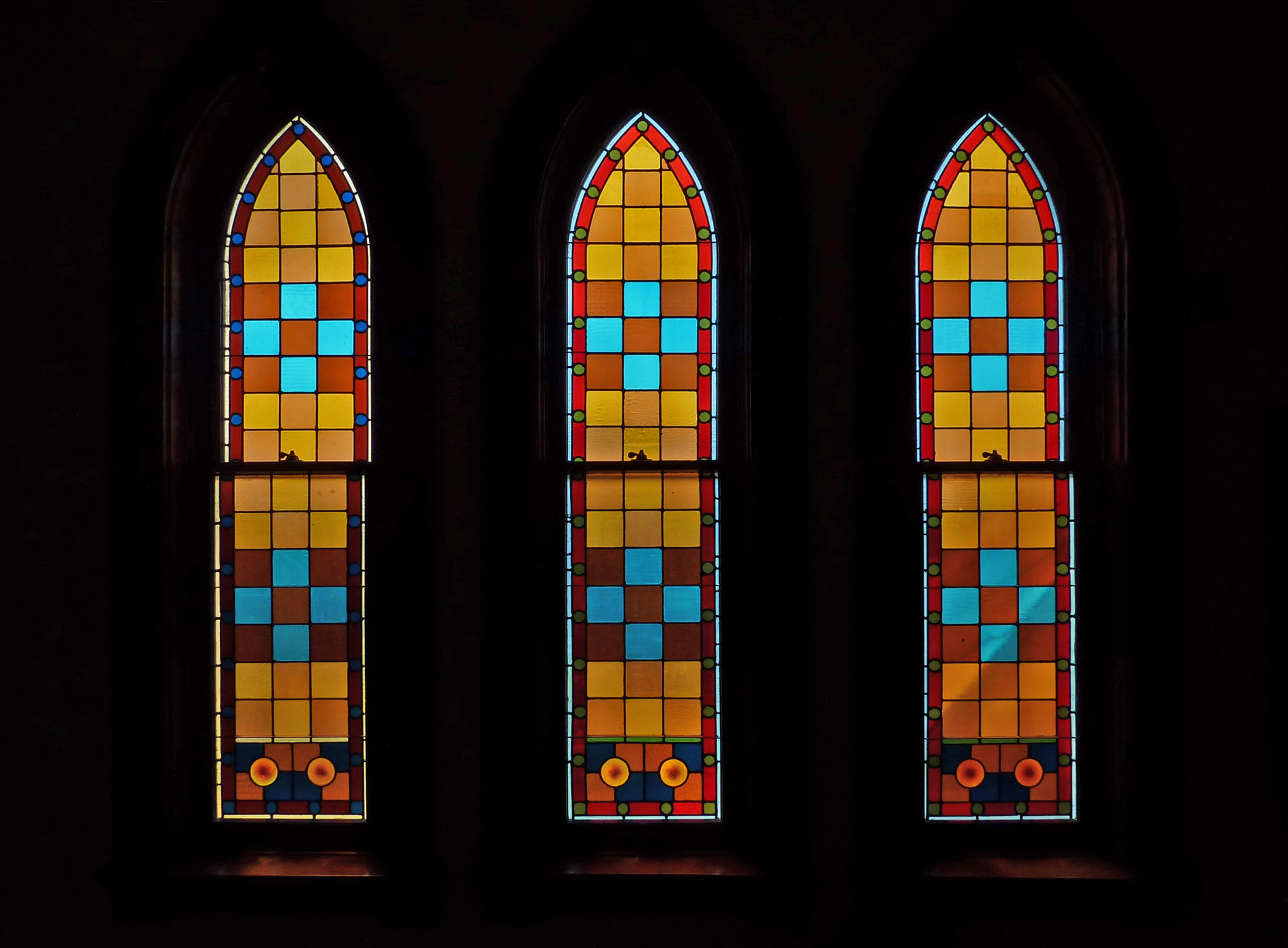
Windows below the rose window

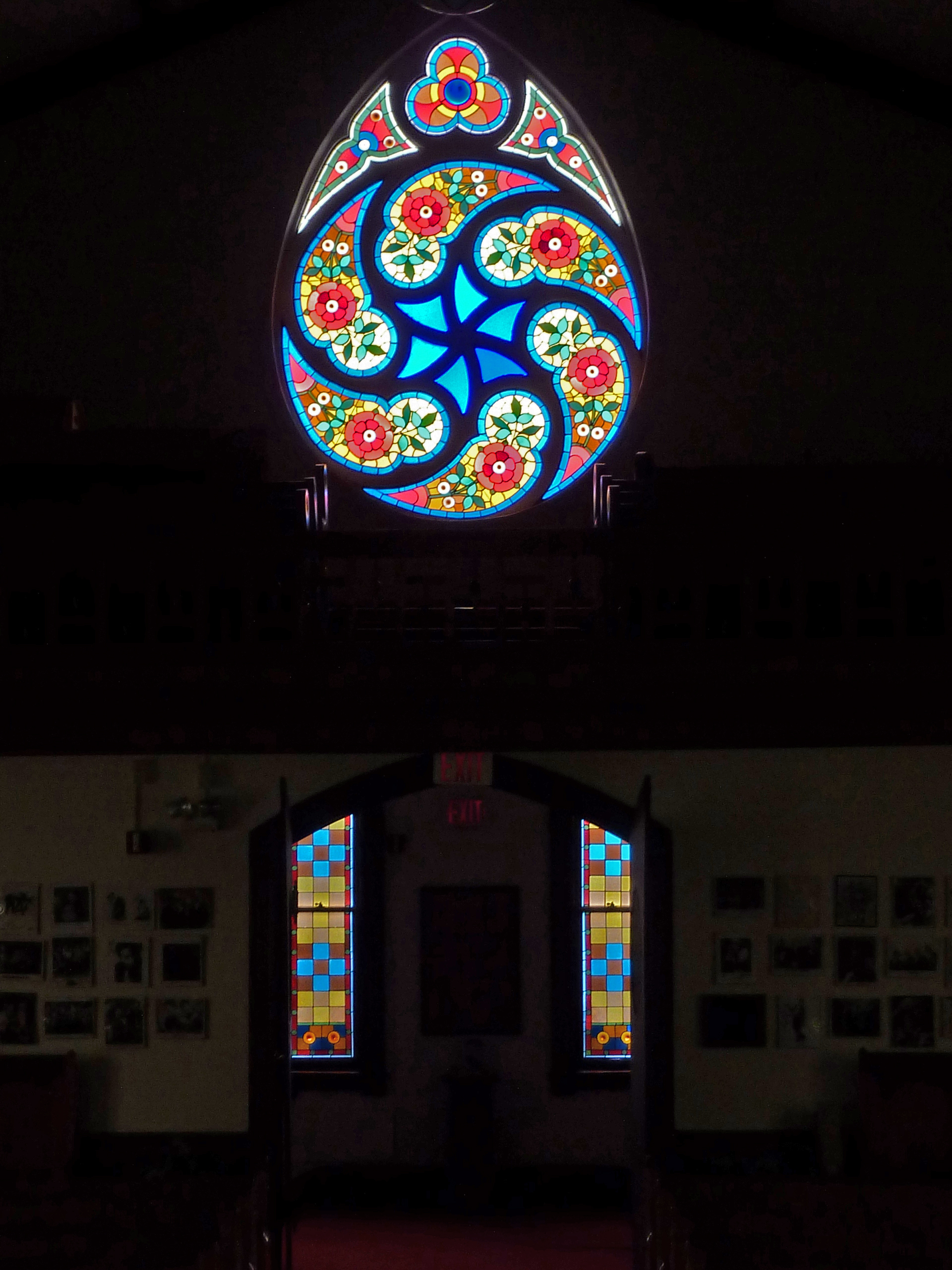
The rose window

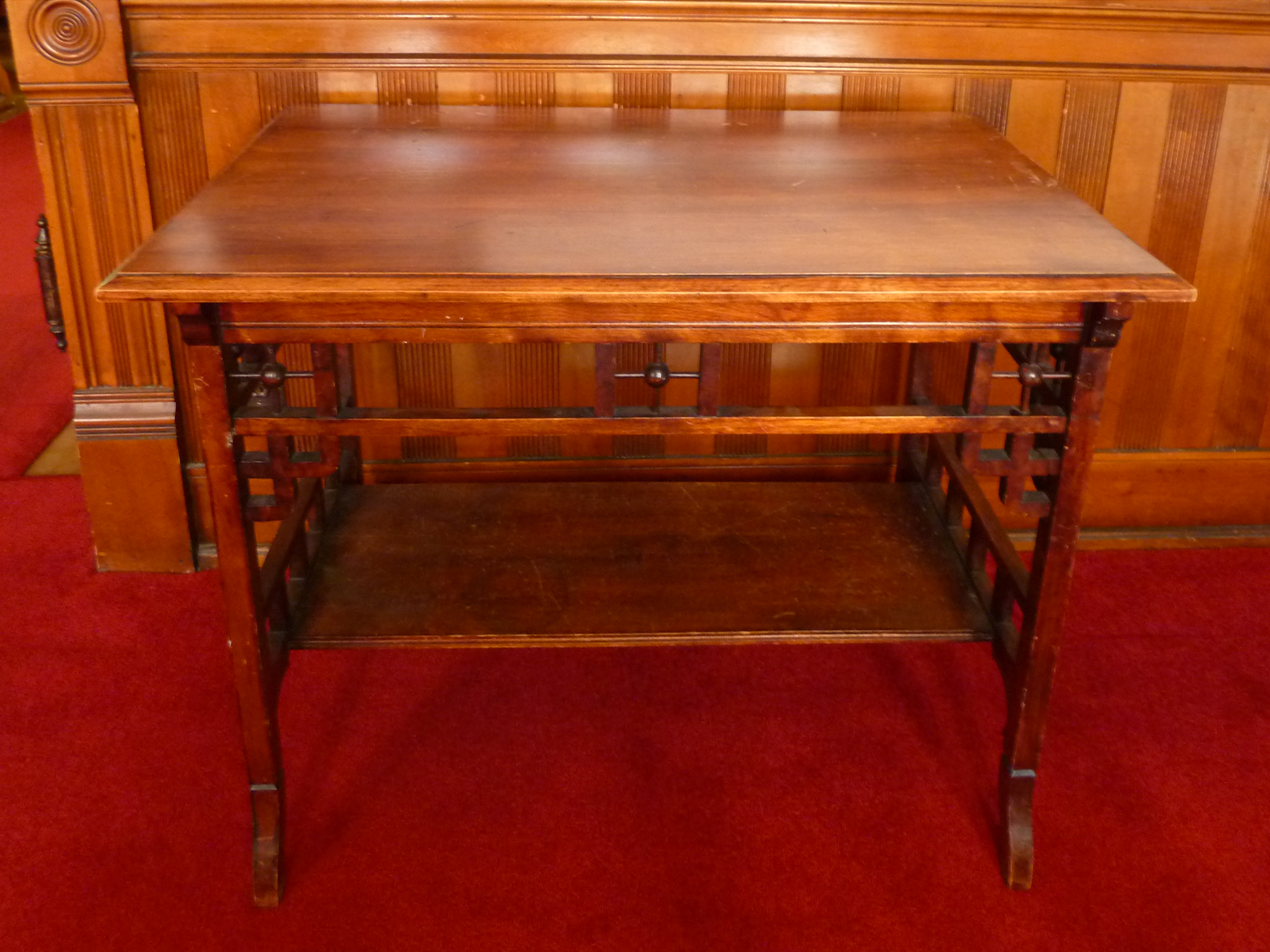
Table in the narthex

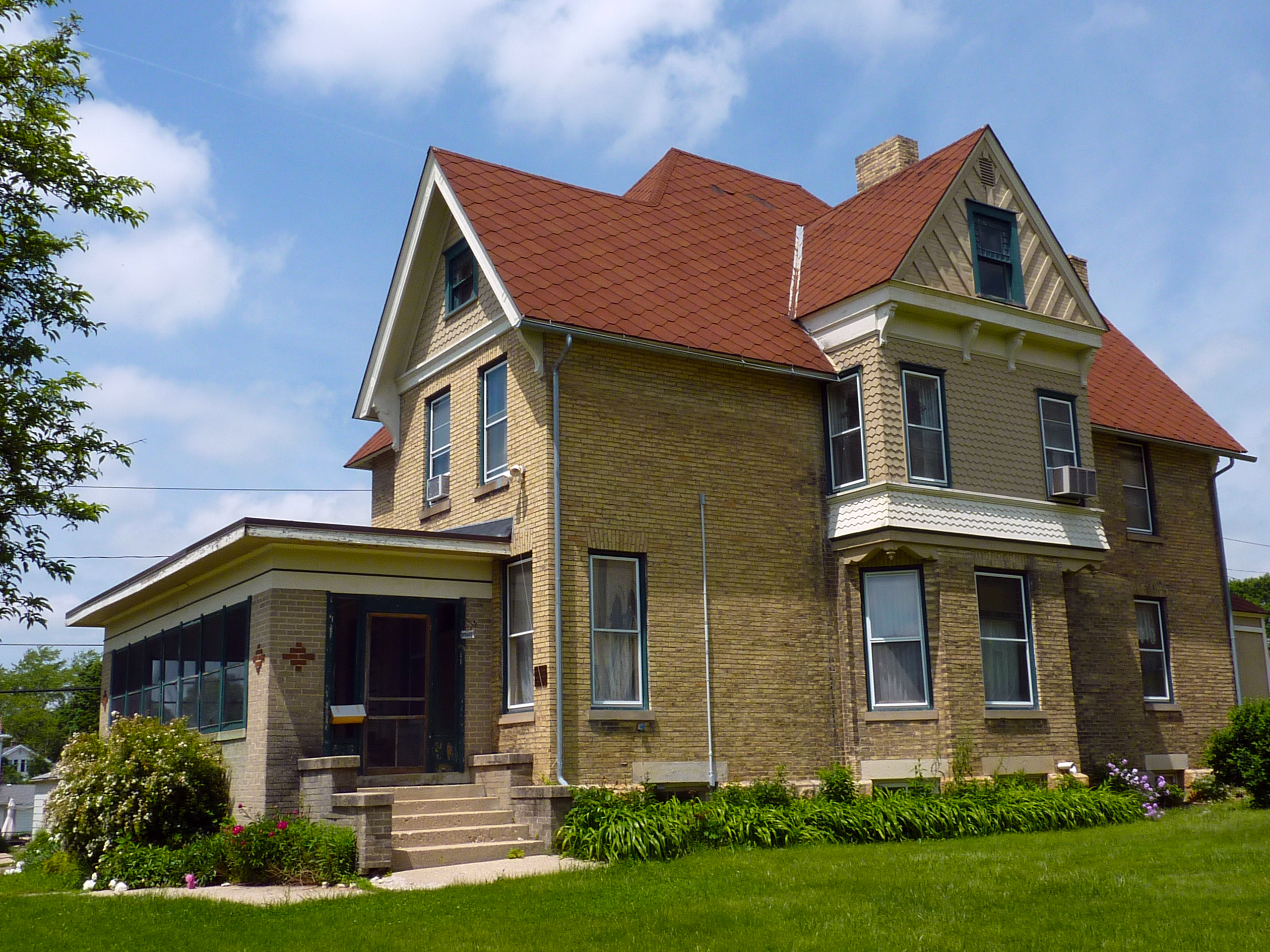
Parsonage

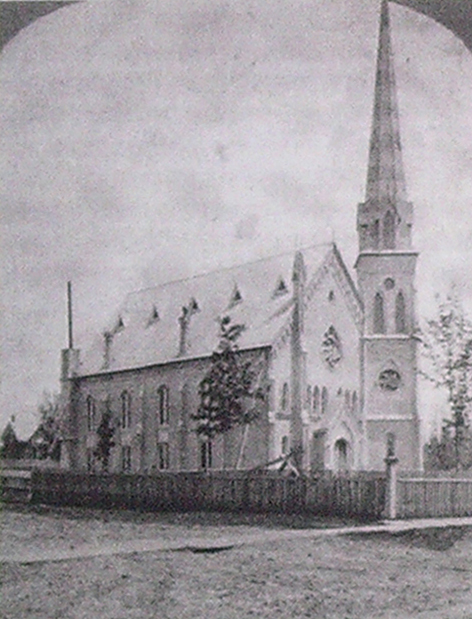
Vintage stereoscope image
