= The St. Paul Globe =

Defunct American newspaper

St. Paul Globe

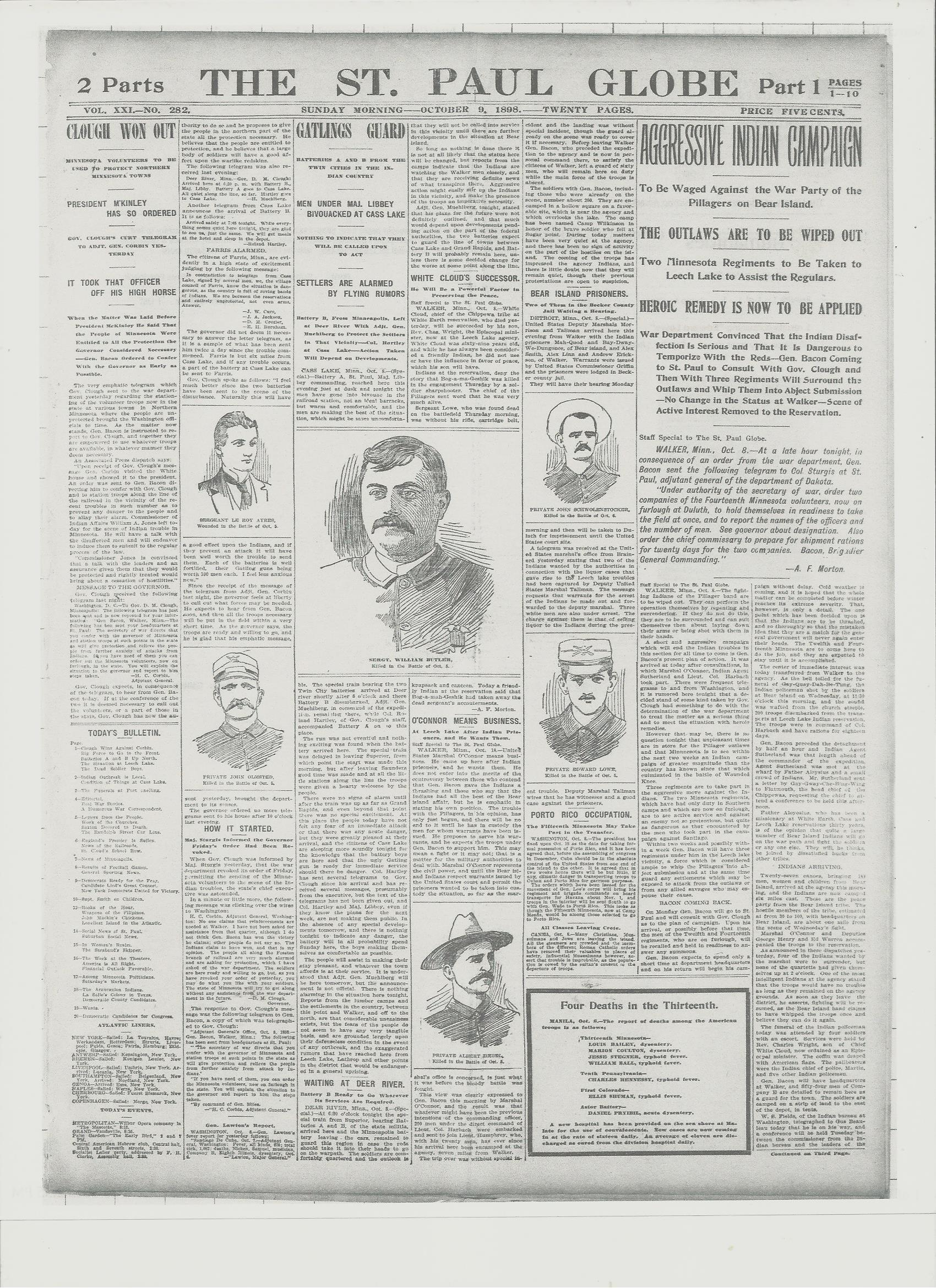
- Logo from 1885; front page from 1898.
- Founder: Harlan P. Hall
- Founded: January 15, 1878
- Ceased publication: April 20, 1905
- Political alignment: Democratic
- Language: American English
- Headquarters: 4th and Cedar Streets, Saint Paul, Minnesota; St. Paul, Minnesota
- City: St. Paul
- Country: United States
- Readership: Minneapolis-St. Paul
- ISSN: 2151-5328
- OCLC number: 21579130

The St. Paul Globe, at times the Saint Paul Globe, the Daily Globe, St. Paul Daily Globe, was a newspaper in Saint Paul, Minnesota, which was published from January 15, 1896, to April 20, 1905. The newspaper's existence coincided with a fivefold increase in the city's population.

== History ==
The Globe was founded by Harlan P. Hall, founder of the Saint Paul Dispatch. In 1876, a stock company purchased the Dispatch and it "transformed over night" from a Democratic newspaper into "an aggressive Republican organ". When Hall founded the Globe in predominantly Democratic Saint Paul, the city council quickly voted to give the new newspaper its printing contract. Under Hall, the newspaper supported Democratic candidates and causes.

In 1881, the newspaper was acquired by a joint stock company consisting of local businessmen and politicians. In 1885, it passed into the hands of Lewis Baker, a Democratic politician from West Virginia.

On May 1, 1887, the Globe moved into the Globe Building, a ten-story Romanesque building designed by architect E. Townsend Mix on the corner of Fourth Street and Cedar Street. It was, until 1889, the tallest building in Saint Paul. It was topped by a 40-foot (12 m) tower with a spiral staircase inside leading into a lookout. A second building for the newspaper's Minneapolis office opened in 1889.

In 1894, Baker left the Globe for a diplomatic post in Nicaragua. It was briefly edited by Judge Charles Eugene Flandrau and briefly owned by the estate of Norman Kittson. In 1896, it was bought by railroad executive James J. Hill and became a mouthpiece for his business interests. While the newspaper remained Democratic, it supported William McKinley in the 1896 Presidential election due to Hall's passionate dislike of William Jennings Bryan. Hall appointed a number of editors: Joseph J. Pyle of the Pioneer Press, George F. Spinney, William F. Luxton of the Winnipeg Free Press, George W. Sikes, and Pyle again. Due to a lack of sufficient advertising revenue, the Globe folded in 1905.

The Globe buildings in Minneapolis and Saint Paul lived on as general office buildings but were eventually torn down in 1958 and 1959, respectively.

Names and dates of the newspaper:

- Daily Globe (St. Paul, Minn.) (1878-1884)
- St. Paul Daily Globe (Saint Paul, Minn.) 1884-1896
- The Saint Paul Globe (St. Paul, Minn.) 1896-1905
- The Morning Call (St. Paul, Minn.) 1894-1895
- The Saint Paul Globe (St. Paul, Minn.) (1896-1905)
