= List of Milwaukee landmarks =

These are just some of the landmarks of Milwaukee.

== Buildings ==
- 100 East Wisconsin
- Allen-Bradley Clock Tower
- Burnham Street Historic District (Frank Lloyd Wright)
- Frederick C. Bogk House
- Germania Building
- Iron Block Building (Milwaukee, Wisconsin)
- Milwaukee City Hall
- Milwaukee Public Central Library
- Mitchell Park Domes
- Old Eschweiler Buildings
- Pabst Theater
- U.S. Bank Center
- Wisconsin Gas Building

== Memorials ==
- Milwaukee County War Memorial
- Holocaust Memorial

== Museums ==
- Milwaukee Art Museum
- Milwaukee Public Museum
- Charles Allis Art Museum
- Villa Terrace Decorative Arts Museum
- Milwaukee County Historical Society and Museum
- Discovery World (museum)
- Betty Brinn Children's Museum
- Captain Frederick Pabst Mansion
- William F. Eisner Museum of Advertising & Design
- Patrick and Beatrice Haggerty Museum of Art
- Harley-Davidson Museum

== Sports venues ==
=== Active ===
- Miller Park
- UW–Milwaukee Panther Arena
- Helfaer Field – A Little League baseball stadium that occupies the infield area of the former Milwaukee County Stadium.
- Fiserv Forum

=== Defunct ===
- Milwaukee County Stadium – Replaced by Miller Park. Most of the site was converted to parking for Miller Park; the infield area was reconfigured into Helfaer Field.
- BMO Harris Bradley Center - Replaced by Fiserv Forum

== Government ==
- Milwaukee City Hall
- Milwaukee County Courthouse
- Federal Building

== Bridges ==
- Hoan Bridge

== Churches ==
- St. Paul's Episcopal Church
- Basilica of St. Josaphat
- St. Joan of Arc Chapel
- Church of the Gesu
- Three Holy Women Parish: St. Hedwig's, St. Rita's, and Holy Rosary
- Cathedral of St. John the Evangelist
- Old St. Mary's Catholic Church
- St. Stanislaus
- Greek Orthodox Church of the Annunciation
- Grace Lutheran Church
- St. Paul's Episcopal Church
- Trinity Evangelical Lutheran Church
- St. Adalbert's Catholic Church
- Calvary Presbyterian Church
- Immanuel Presbyterian Church
- Tripoli Temple
- Cathedral Church of All Saints
- Christ Evangelical Lutheran Church
- St. James Episcopal Church
- St. John's Evangelical Lutheran Church Complex
- St. Peter's Evangelical Lutheran Church
- St. Stephen Evangelical Lutheran Church

== Public Art ==
- The Calling
- Leif, the Discoverer
- Family
- Goethe Schiller Monument
- Gertie the Duck
- Bronze Fonz
