= West Washington-North Hi-Mount Boulevards Historic District =

Historic district in Wisconsin, United States

- U.S. National Register of Historic Places
- U.S. Historic district
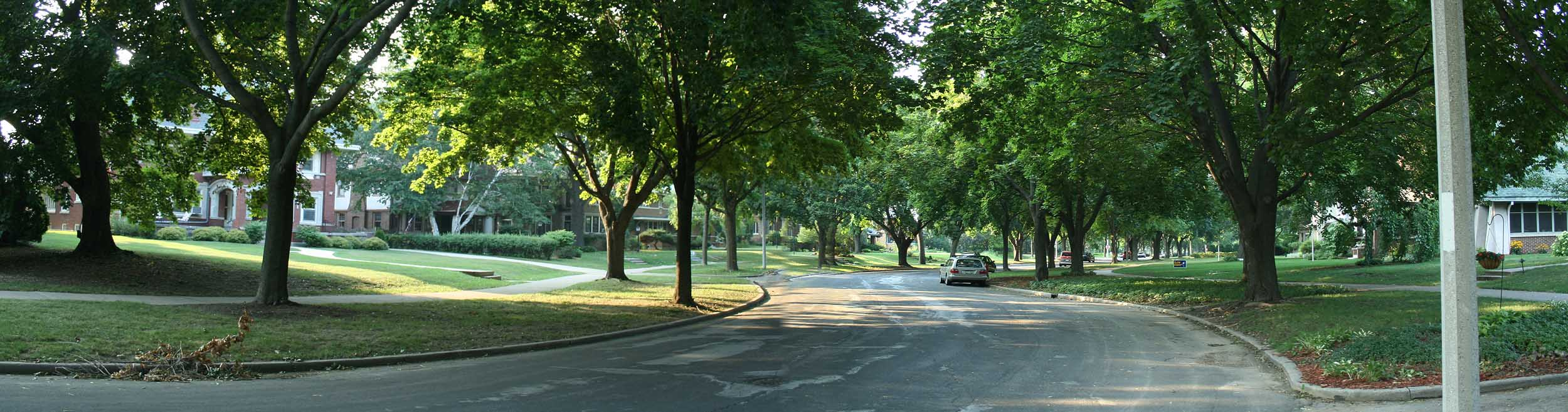
- A portion of the district.
- Location: 4701-5929 W. Washington Blvd.; 1720-2049 N. Hi-Mount Blvd., Milwaukee, Wisconsin
- Coordinates: 43.05295°N 87.98102°W
- Area: 29 acres (12 ha)
- NRHP reference No.: 94000422
- Added to NRHP: May 18, 1994

The West Washington-North Hi-Mount Boulevards Historic District is a historic neighborhood in Milwaukee, Wisconsin, with stylish homes built along the named streets beginning in 1912, mostly businessmen and professionals. In 1994 the district was listed on the National Register of Historic Places.

== History ==
The land that includes Washington Boulevard was annexed in 1906. In 1910 the land that includes Hi-Mount was annexed, and street and sewer improvements were begun. A 1911 ad in the Milwaukee Sentinel pitched: "Hi-Mount, the beautiful new residence district, lies just one block west of Washington Park and is the most desirable residence property on the West Side." In fact, the area was one of Milwaukee's first "automobile suburbs," which allowed people to drive from work to a healthy country-like suburb.

The neighborhood contains about 148 properties that contribute to the NRHP historic district. Here are a few good examples of different styles, and houses with interesting owners, roughly in the order built.

- The Donath/Style house at 1933 N Hi-Mount Blvd is a 2 1/2-story side-gabled Craftsman-style house designed by Edward Kozick and built in 1912 - the first known residence built on Hi-Mount. Its first floor is clad in brick. Above that are wood shingles, laid so that every fourth row is doubled. Donath lived there only a year, then sold the house to Frederick and Caroline Style, who lived there into the 1930s.
- The Arnold Meyer house at 1833 N. Hi-Mount Blvd. is a 2 1/2-story Arts and Crafts-style house designed by Alexander Eschweiler and built in 1912. It was the second house permitted on Hi-Mount. The ground floor is clad in brick, the second story in stucco, and the roof with terra cotta tile. Arnold Meyer headed the Meyer Construction Company, building this house for himself to live in. He and his company built other houses in the district.
- The Keller/Brumder house at 1825 N. Hi-Mount Blvd. is a 2-story Craftsman-style house built in 1912, with walls clad in Roman brick, a hip roof with broad flared eaves, and a matching front porch supported by large piers. It was one of three houses built in the first year of construction on Hi-Mount. Edwin G. Keller was a clerk at Concordia Fire Insurance Company when the house was built, but was president of Snow White Laundry in 1914. The following year when Keller moved out of the house, he was vice-president of Goethel Sheet Metal Works. The house was bought by Herman O. Brumder, business manager of Germania Herold Association, a German-language publisher on Wells Street.
- The Joseph Gross bungalow at 1930 N Hi-Mount Blvd is a 1 1/2-story front-gabled house designed by Fred Graf and built in 1913, featuring a large open front porch and a prominent chimney.
- The Seefeld house at 2013 N Hi-Mount Blvd is a 2 1/2-story house built in 1913. It was designed by Gustav Dick with an American Foursquare form in its cube shape, hip roof, and full front porch, and with Craftsman styling in its broad eaves and exposed rafter tails. William Charles Seefeld was an attorney born in Iowa.
- The Braun house at 1817 N Hi-Mount Blvd. is a 2 1/2-story Arts and Crafts-style house built in 1913 and designed by Gustav Dick with a jerkinhead gable roof and broad, prominent bargeboards. All these with the flower boxes under the windows give the design a Dutch feel. August Braun was a son of German immigrants who earned a law degree from the University of Wisconsin and practiced law with his brother. He married Ethel Neilson the year the house was built, and later became a civil court judge.
- The Donath house at 1924 N Hi-Mount Blvd is a 1 1/2-story Arts and Crafts-style bungalow built in 1913, with brick walls, various roof types clad in cement asbestos tile, and projecting bay casement window. Bernhard A. Donath was a carpenter who designed the house for himself, and he and his wife Aurelia lived there until 1921.
- The Fiebing house at 1818 N Hi-Mount Blvd. is a dignified 2 1/2-story home built in 1914 and designed by Gustav Dick in Colonial Revival style, with a symmetric front and twin columns supporting a front porch with a barrel-arched roof which echoes in the arched roof of the dormer directly above. John H. Fiebing was another son of German immigrants, who went back to Germany to study chemistry and to marry German Marie Thiele in 1887. That same year they returned to Milwaukee and he took a job in the chemical department of the Pfister and Vogel Leather Company. In 1897 John left P&V to start his own chemical manufacturing business, which is still making leather care products.
- The Louis & Mary Nehrbass house at 1750 N Hi-Mount Blvd. is a 2 1/2-story house designed by Clare Hosmer and built by Herman Behling and John Fischer in 1915. Its style is Arts and Crafts, indicated by the ornamental inlays in the brick and the contrast between brick on the first story and stucco above. Louis owned a shoe store on N. 3rd Street.
- The Theodore Trecker house at 1735 N. Hi-Mount Blvd. is a 2 1/2-story brick house built in 1915. It was designed by Charles Tharinger in German Renaissance Revival style, evident in the parapet gable-fronts. The original owner was Trecker, the president of Kearney and Trecker, which manufactured milling machinery and machine tools. Trecker moved here after living near his factory in West Allis, and the Trecker family lived in the house until 1960, when they donated it to the Capuchin Order for use as a monastery.
- The William Gettelman house at 1759 N. Hi-Mount Blvd is a 2-story home designed by Robert Messmer and Brothers in Prairie Style in 1915. Hallmarks of the style are the emphasis on horizontal, the broad eaves, and the hip roof. William was the president of Gettelman Brewing, vice-president of the West Side Bank, treasurer of the A.B.C. Oil Burner Co., and treasurer of Federal Asbestos Company.
- The Emma and Alfred Steinman house at 1751 N. Hi-Mount Blvd. is a 2-story brick house designed by Gustav Dick and built in 1915. Its style is eclectic, drawing the door surround from Renaissance Revival, the roof tiles and wrought-iron balcony from Mediterranean Revival, and the broad eaves from Prairie School. Steinman worked his way up in his father's lumber business and was brother-in-law to William Gettelman nearby.
- The William Davidson house at 5016 W Washington Blvd is a 2 1/2-story house designed by Gustav Dick in Classical Revival style, with brick-clad walls, paired brackets beneath the eaves, and a terra cotta red tile hip roof. William Davidson was a partner in Harley-Davidson Motor Cycle.
- The Arthur Davidson house at 1809 Hi-Mount Blvd. is a 2 1/2-story brick house designed by Alexander Eschweiler, with the symmetry and cornice returns of Colonial Revival style, but some unusual round arches worked into the design. Arthur was the vice-president and sales manager of Harley-Davidson.
- The John Fischer house at 1810 N. Hi-Mount Blvd. is a 2-story Georgian Revival-style house built in 1916 by carpenter/contractor John F. Fischer for himself. The architect is unknown, but it has a stately design, symmetric with the main entry flanked by paired columns, a rounded pediment above, and interesting brackets under the soffits.
- The Gallun house at 1837 N Hi-Mount Blvd is another 2 1/2-story Georgian Revival house built in 1916, this one designed by Gustav Dick, with a slate hip roof, corner quoins in the brickwork, and the front entrance framed by limestone Ionic columns supporting a segmentally-arched limestone pediment. Oscar Gallun was the superintendent of the Trostel Tanning Company, and lived in this house until 1979, making him longest-lasting of the original owners on Hi-Mount.
- The Rheineck house at 1822 N Hi-Mount Blvd is a 2 1/2-story Dutch Colonial Revival-styled house built in 1916, with the gambrel roof that is the hallmark of the style, but a pediment and pilasters on the sun room that could be drawn from Georgian Revival style. Arthur F. Rheineck was a physician with an office downtown. In 1922 he and John Fischer at 1810 N. Hi-Mount apparently swapped houses.
- The Lenicheck house at 2004 N Hi-Mount Blvd is a 2 1/2-story brick and stucco Craftsman-style house designed by Charles Keller and built in 1917. It sports wide flat bargeboards with decorated tails. Frank J. Lenicheck was a lawyer with an office at Plankinton and W. Wisconsin.
- The Hunholz house at 2032 N Hi-Mount Blvd is a 1 1/2-story sunroom bungalow built in 1919, with a small eyebrow dormer in the roof, brick-clad walls, and Craftsman styling. Henry Hunholz was a carpenter/contractor who built the house and lived there himself for three years.
- The Westfahl house at 4812 W Washington Blvd is a 1 1/2-story Craftsman-style stucco and brick bungalow built by the Walter Treuttner Company. Fred C. Westfahl Jr. was a clerk in the U.S. Federal Court and a state assemblyman.
- The Speich house at 2010 N Hi-Mount Blvd is a 1 1/2-story bungalow designed by Liebert & Liebert and built in 1920. The unusual thing is that the modest-sized bungalow is dressed in Mediterranean Revival style, with red terra cotta tile on the roof, fine windows, and its entrance flanked by classical columns. These expensive finishes are not usually applied to smaller-sized homes. Albert Speich was president of Speich Stove Repair.
- The Tausend house at 5044 W Washington Blvd is a 1 1/2-story bungalow designed by Cornelius Leenhouts in English Cottage style, with a faux thatched roof and built in 1921. Emil A. Tausend was the vice-president of F.E. Abeles Company, a clothing manufacturer.
- The Hanser house at 4804 W. Washington Blvd is a 1 1/2-story Mediterranean-style bungalow built in 1922 with a Spanish-style green terra cotta roof. Joseph Hanser worked for his family's soap-manufacturing business.
- The Reukema house at 4918 W Washington Blvd is a 2-story house designed by Walter Veenandahl in Spanish Colonial Revival style and built in 1922, with stucco walls and a red clay tile hipped roof. The first owner was Mrs. Katie Reukema, the widow of a partner in a Milwaukee law firm.
- The Mount Olive Lutheran Church complex at 5327 W Washington Blvd includes the 1923 church building designed by Kirchhoff & Rose in Neo-Gothic style with a square, crenelated tower. The complex also includes a school designed by Grassold Johnson in Tudor Revival style and built in 1950.
- The Theilacker house at 5924 W Washington Blvd is a grand 2 1/2-story Tudor Revival-style home built in 1923 with mock half-timbering, brick and stucco exterior, and jerkinhead gable roofs clad in red terra cotta tile. Julius Theilacker owned a bridge contracting firm.
- The Sommerfield house at 1902 N Hi-Mount Blvd is a 2-story Tudor Revival-style house clad in random rubble limestone. Hallmarks of Tudor style are the steep roof surfaces and prominent chimney. Charles Sommerfield was a carpenter/contractor who built the house in 1925. It was vacant during 1926 and 1927, until he moved in, so he may have had trouble selling it. This was the last house built in the historic district on Hi-Mount. Sommerfield also built and lived in 1728 and 1902 N. Hi-Mount.
- St. Sebastian Roman Catholic Church at 5400-5422 W Washington Blvd is another Neo-Gothic style church, designed by Herbst and Kuenzli and built in 1929. The church has a cruciform floorplan. Walls are clad in dressed limestone. The complex also includes a 3-story Mediterranean Revival-style rectory built in 1926.
