= Herman Schnetzky =

German-American architect

- Born: Herman Paul Schnetzky; December 27, 1849; Wriezen, Province of Brandenburg, Kingdom of Prussia, German Confederation
- Died: April 27, 1916 (aged 66); Milwaukee, Wisconsin, U.S.
- Occupation: Architect
- Buildings: Germania Building
- Projects: Saint John's Evangelical Lutheran Church

Herman Paul Schnetzky (1849 – 1916) was a German American architect who is known for his works in Milwaukee, Wisconsin. Schnetzky was active designing buildings in the late 19th century.

== Career ==
In 1867 Schnetzky migrated to the United States. In 1869 he worked in the draft department of Milwaukee architect George Mygatt. He formed a partnership with Henry C. Koch which lasted until 1887. When Schnetzky left Koch's office to start his own architectural firm, Eugene R. Liebert followed to work as Schnetzky's foreman. In 1891 Liebert became a partner with Schnetzky, and together they designed many buildings in Milwaukee. Their partnership lasted until 1897, when Liebert left to form his own architectural office.The duo's best known buildings were in Rundbogenstil, the German Romanesque Revival style.

== Personal ==
He was married to Maria Louise Knab Schnetzky and together they had two children, Oscar Paul Schnetzky and Hugo Walter Schnetzky. Hugo Walter Schnetzky studied architecture at Columbia University and returned to work with his father until Herman Schnetzky's death.

== List of works ==
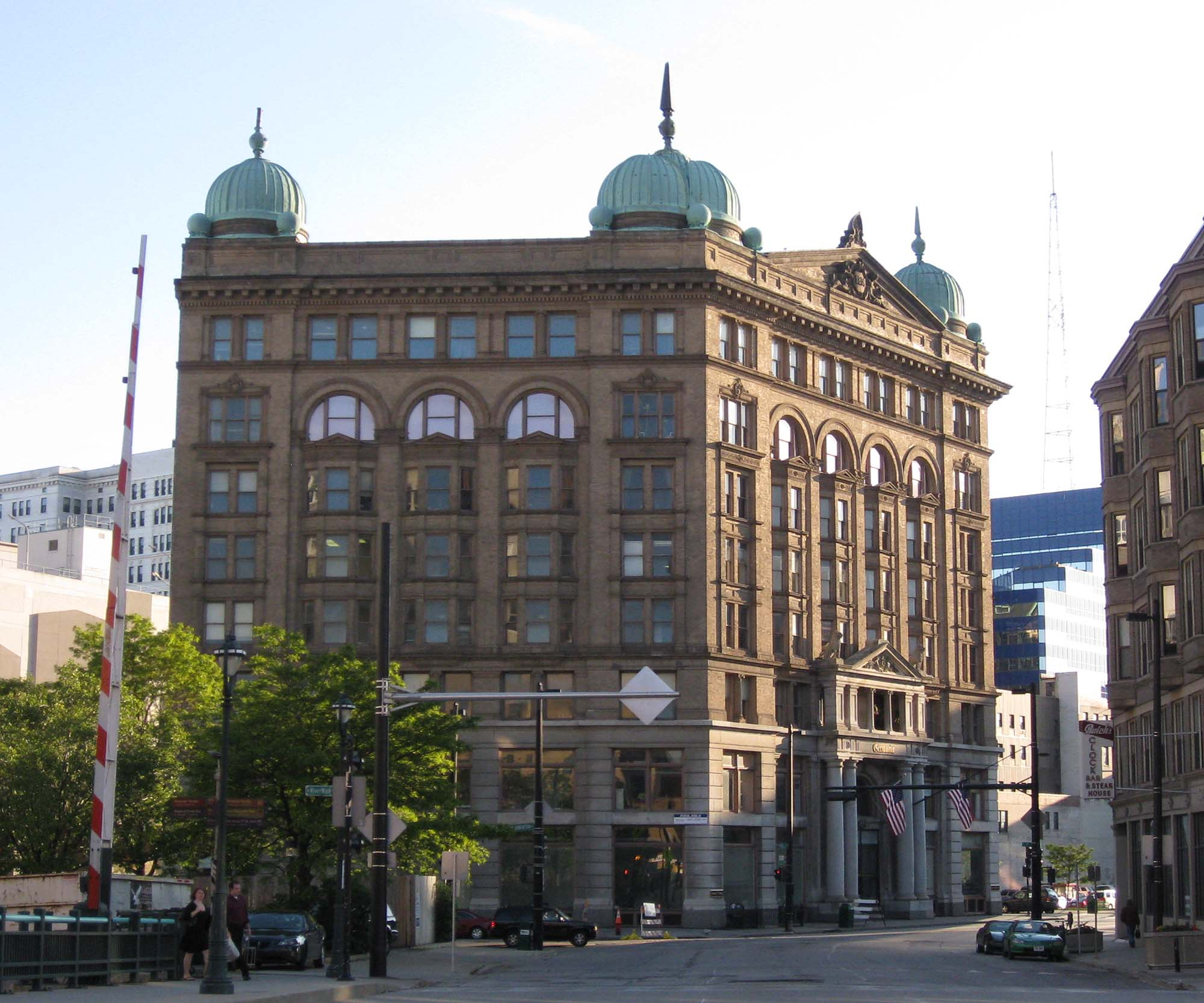
The Germania Building (1896) in Milwaukee, Wisconsin, designed by the German-born architects Herman Schnetzky & Eugene R. Liebert

All buildings are in Milwaukee unless otherwise noted.

- Greenfield School in West Allis, Wisconsin (1887)
- St. Martini Evangelical Lutheran Church (1887)
- Second German Methodist-Episcopal Church (1887)
- St. Lucas Lutheran Church (1888)
- Fifth Street School (1888), with John Moller, now Fifth Street School Apartments
- McGeoch Building (1890), Schnetzky & Liebert
- St. John's Evangelical Lutheran Church (1889), Schnetzky & Liebert
- Blatz Brewing Company Office (1890)
- J. P. Kissinger Block (1893), Schnetzky & Liebert
- Lohman Livery Stable (1893), Schnetzky & Liebert
- St. Michael’s Church (1893), Schnetzky & Liebert with Hugo Walter Schnetzky
- Ernst Pommer House (1895), Schnetzky & Liebert
- West Division High School (1895), Schnetzky & Liebert with Hugo Walter Schnetzky
- Germania Building (1896), Schnetzky & Liebert
- F. Mayer Boot and Shoe Company Building (1892–99), now Fortress Apartments
- St. Stephen Lutheran School, with Hugo Walter Schnetzky
- George Ziegler Candy Company (1907), now Brix Apartment Lofts
