= Wangerin =

Wangerin may refer to:

- Friedrich Heinrich Albert Wangerin (1844-1933), German mathematician
- Walther Wangerin (1884–1938), German botanist
- Walter Wangerin, Jr. (1944-2021), American author
- Wangerin Organ Company, American pipe organ company
- The German name of Węgorzyno, Poland
