= St. Martini Evangelical Lutheran Church =

Historic church in Wisconsin, United States

- U.S. National Register of Historic Places
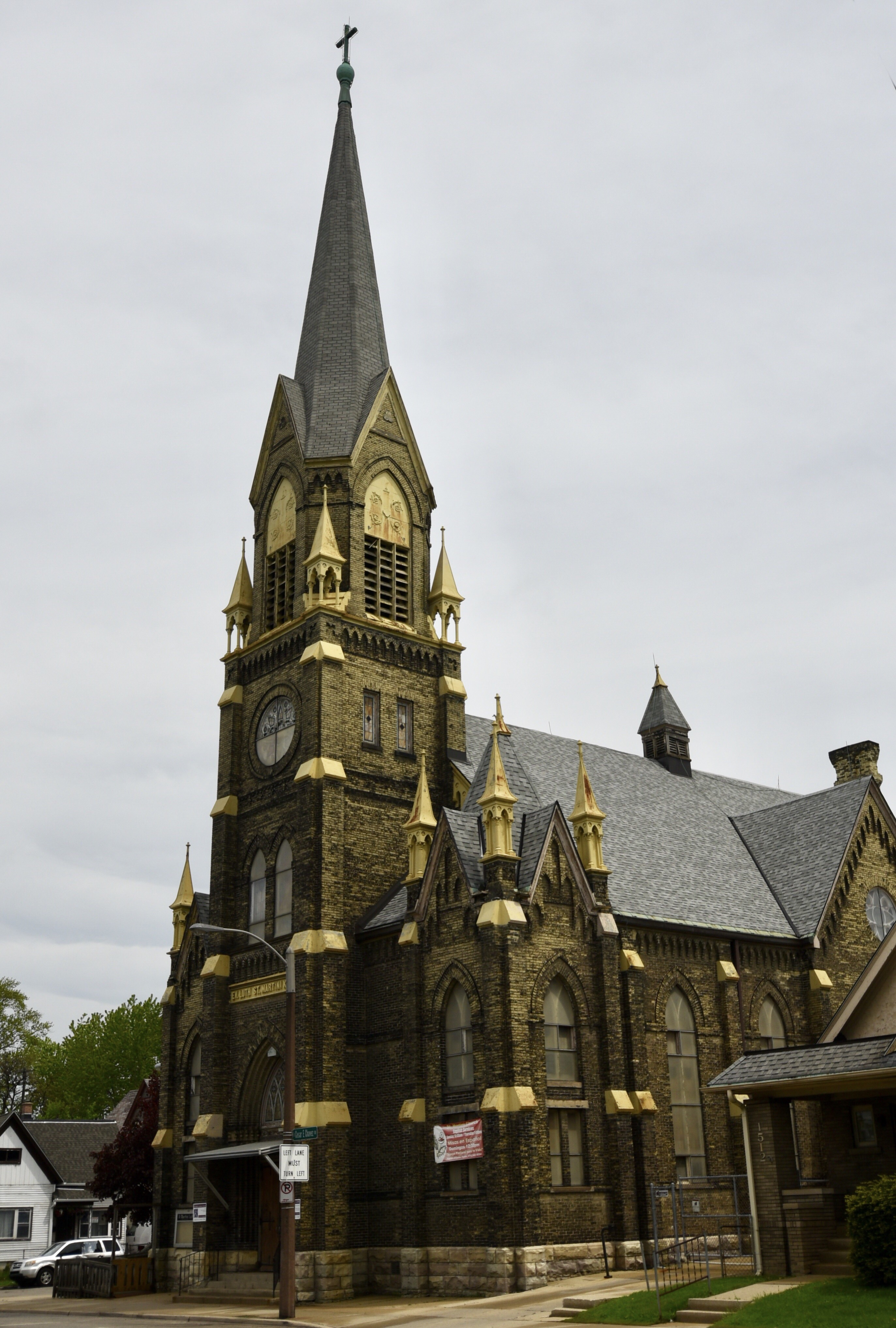
- Location: 1557 W. Orchard St. Milwaukee, Wisconsin
- Coordinates: 43.01584°N 87.9326°W
- Built: 1887
- Architect: Herman Schnetzky
- Architectural style: Victorian Gothic
- NRHP reference No.: 87001741
- Added to NRHP: September 25, 1987

St. Martini Evangelical Lutheran Church is a historic church built in 1887 to serve the growing German immigrant population in Milwaukee, Wisconsin. The brick church building was designed by German-born architect Herman Paul Schnetzky in a Gothic Revival style. It was added to the National Register of Historic Places in 1987.

Milwaukee's near South Side was first settled in the early 1850s, by a mix of German immigrants and Yankees. In years that followed, they were joined by Irish, Swedes, Norwegians, Poles and Serbians; the neighborhood is a melting pot. St. Stephen's Lutheran Church served this neighborhood for years, until in 1884 a group forked off to form St. Martini. They built a school in 1883, and began to plan their own church building.

They hired Herman Paul Schnetzky, a German immigrant, to design their new building. Schnetzky designed a gable-roofed main block with cream brick walls pierced by lancet windows - a hallmark of Gothic Revival style. A square central tower dominates the front, with a round stained glass window in the first stage, a belfry in the second stage, a steeple above that, and a cross topping them all, 150 feet above the ground. Two short towers at the corners of the building flank the central tower. Like the central tower, they are each decorated with four small pinnacles. A rationale for Gothic Revival style is that the steeple and window tops all point toward heaven.

Inside, the main auditorium has a vaulted plaster ceiling. Cast iron columns support barrel vaults. The layout is center-aisle, with a balcony with pipe organ above the entry facing the altar in the apse. The building was completed in 1887 at a cost of $14,327.

After all these years the church remains very intact and still serves as a visual landmark on the South Side.

== See also ==
- National Register of Historic Places listings in Milwaukee, Wisconsin
