= Fred C. Westfahl Jr. =

American politician

Frederick Carl Westfahl Jr. (January 17, 1876 - October 25, 1967) was a member of the Wisconsin State Assembly.

== Biography ==
Westfahl was born on January 17, 1876, in Milwaukee, Wisconsin. His former home, now known as the Frederick C. Westfahl, Jr. House, is located in the West Washington-North Hi-Mount Boulevards Historic District.

== Career ==
Westfahl was elected to the Assembly in 1902. He was a Republican.
