= Wangerin Organ Company =

Maker of pipe organs

The Wangerin Organ Company (1912-1942) was a manufacturer of pipe organs based in Milwaukee, Wisconsin. It was a continuation of the company after the partnership of Adolph Wangerin and George J. Weickhardt, Wangerin-Weickhardt, ended with the death of Weickhardt in 1919. It had previously also been known as the Hann-Wangerin-Weickhardt company. Many of its organs are still played in churches today.

During the theater organ boom in the 1920s, when the Barton Organ Company of Oshkosh, Wisconsin could not keep up with the production demand, the Wangerin factory first loaned them factory space, and later was sub-contracted to build organs for them.

During World War II, when manufacture of musical instruments was banned in 1942 in order to focus on the war effort, the Wangerin-Weickhardt Company built wooden airplane parts and other war-related goods. The firm did not resume organ building after the war, so it effectively ceased operation as an organ builder in 1942.

== Some Wangerin organ locations ==
- St. Peter's Evangelical Lutheran Church (Milwaukee, Wisconsin) (Wangerin-Weickhardt, Opus 146, 1914 / Verlinden Organ Co., Opus 641, 1948/49)
- St. Mary's Church - 1920 (Riverside, Iowa)
- St. John's United Church of Christ (Monroe, Wisconsin) - 1923
- Christ's Church (Rye, New York) - 1924 (replaced 1960s)
- Madison Masonic Center (Madison, Wisconsin) - 1925
- Mosinee United Methodist Church (Mosinee, Wisconsin) - 1928
- Freeport Masonic Temple (Freeport, Illinois) - 1928 two small organs (two manual 9 stop) and one large organ (3 manual, 32 stop)
- Saint Peter's Evangelical Lutheran Church (St. Peter, Minnesota) - 1939 (Replaced in 1983 by J. Walker Organ from Essex, England) The Walker organ was subsequently damaged in the 1998 tornado and it was sent back to Walker to be rebuilt. As of 2014 it stands in the balcony of the new church built following the tornado. The pedal division, formerly at the floor behind the swell, is now elevated to provide a walkway behind the organ.
- St. Mary of the Immaculate Conception Catholic Church (Portage, Wisconsin)
- Holy Cross Church (Kaukauna, Wisconsin)
- Praise Church (Beaver Dam, Wisconsin)
- St. Anthony Roman Catholic Church (Milwaukee, Wisconsin) (Schuelke/Wangerin/Erickson)
- Saint John's Evangelical Lutheran Church (Milwaukee, Wisconsin) (Barckhoff/Wangerin)
- St. Lucas Evangelical Lutheran Church (Milwaukee, Wisconsin) (Schuelke/Wangerin/Verlinden/Sipe)
- St. Stephen Lutheran Church (Milwaukee, Wisconsin)
- Sacred Heart Catholic Church (Dubuque, Iowa)
- Saint Joseph's Catholic Church (Mason City, Iowa)
- St. Vibiana's Cathedral (Los Angeles) Parts of this instrument were incorporated into the new organ by Dobson in the present Cathedral.
- St. Louis Catholic Church (Caledonia, Wisconsin)
- Wesley United Methodist Church (Ottumwa, Iowa)
- St. John's Lutheran Church (Woodstock, Illinois)
- St. Peter's Evangelical Lutheran Church (Indianapolis, Indiana)
- St Mary's Church (Fond du Lac, Wisconsin)
- St Mary's Church (Menasha, Wisconsin)
- St. Louis Catholic Church (Washburn, Wisconsin)
- St. Michael Catholic Church (Fort Loramie, Ohio)
- St. Luke's Episcopal Church (Hastings, Minnesota)
- St. John's Evangelical Lutheran Church (Tolleston, Indiana)/(Gary, Indiana)
- St. Peters Lutheran Church (Hilbert, Wisconsin)
- Immanuel Lutheran Church LCMS (Spring Valley Township, McPherson County, Kansas). A two-manual Himers organ purchased after it was removed from a former theater.
- / St Paul Lutheran Church (Waseca, MN) Moved to a home Bemidji MN,1980. Six Rank. I doubt it had been releathered, and has not been yet.
