= Iron Block Building (Milwaukee, Wisconsin) =

- U.S. National Register of Historic Places
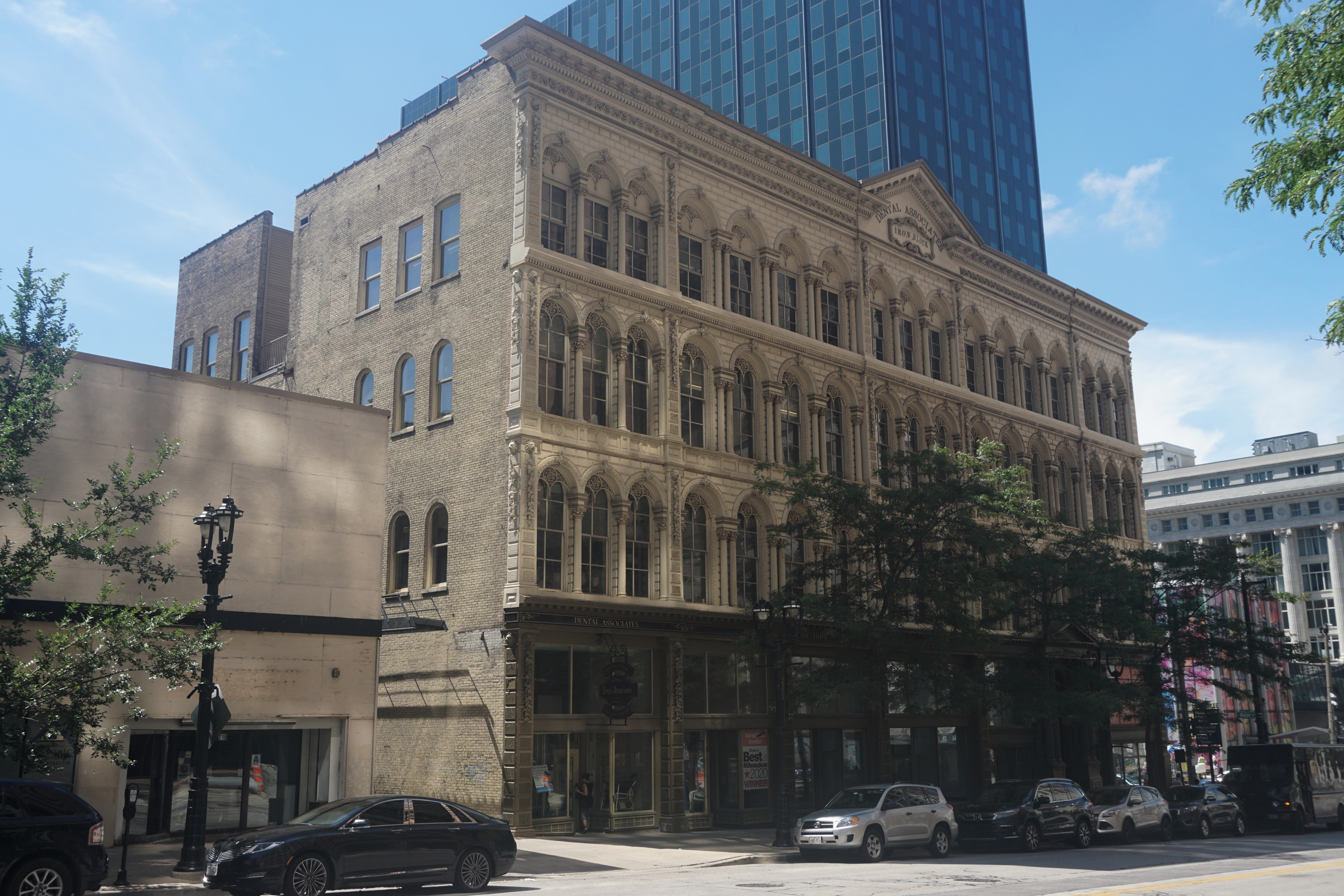
- Iron Block Building
- Location: 205 E. Wisconsin Ave. Milwaukee, Wisconsin
- Coordinates: 43.0384°N 87.9087°W
- Built: 1860
- Architect: George H. Johnson
- NRHP reference No.: 74000105
- Added to NRHP: December 27, 1974

The Iron Block Building is a five-story commercial structure with a cast-iron exterior built in 1860 in Milwaukee, Wisconsin. In 1974 it was added to the National Register of Historic Places - the only surviving building in Milwaukee with a cast iron skin - a common technique from 1850 to 1870.

== History ==
James Baynard Martin moved from Maryland to Milwaukee in 1845, where he dealt in grain and real estate, and served as an insurance executive and banker. By 1860 he was ready to build a large speculative commercial block in downtown Milwaukee.

From 1850 to 1870 there was a trend to clad some commercial buildings in cast iron panels. The panels were durable and fire-resistant, and they could be applied to a structure without having skilled stonemasons on site. Martin chose that type of building, and engaged Daniel D. Badger's Architectural Iron Works of New York to design it. George H. Johnson designed the building, panels were cast in New York, they were transported to Milwaukee by boat, and the building was constructed in 1860.

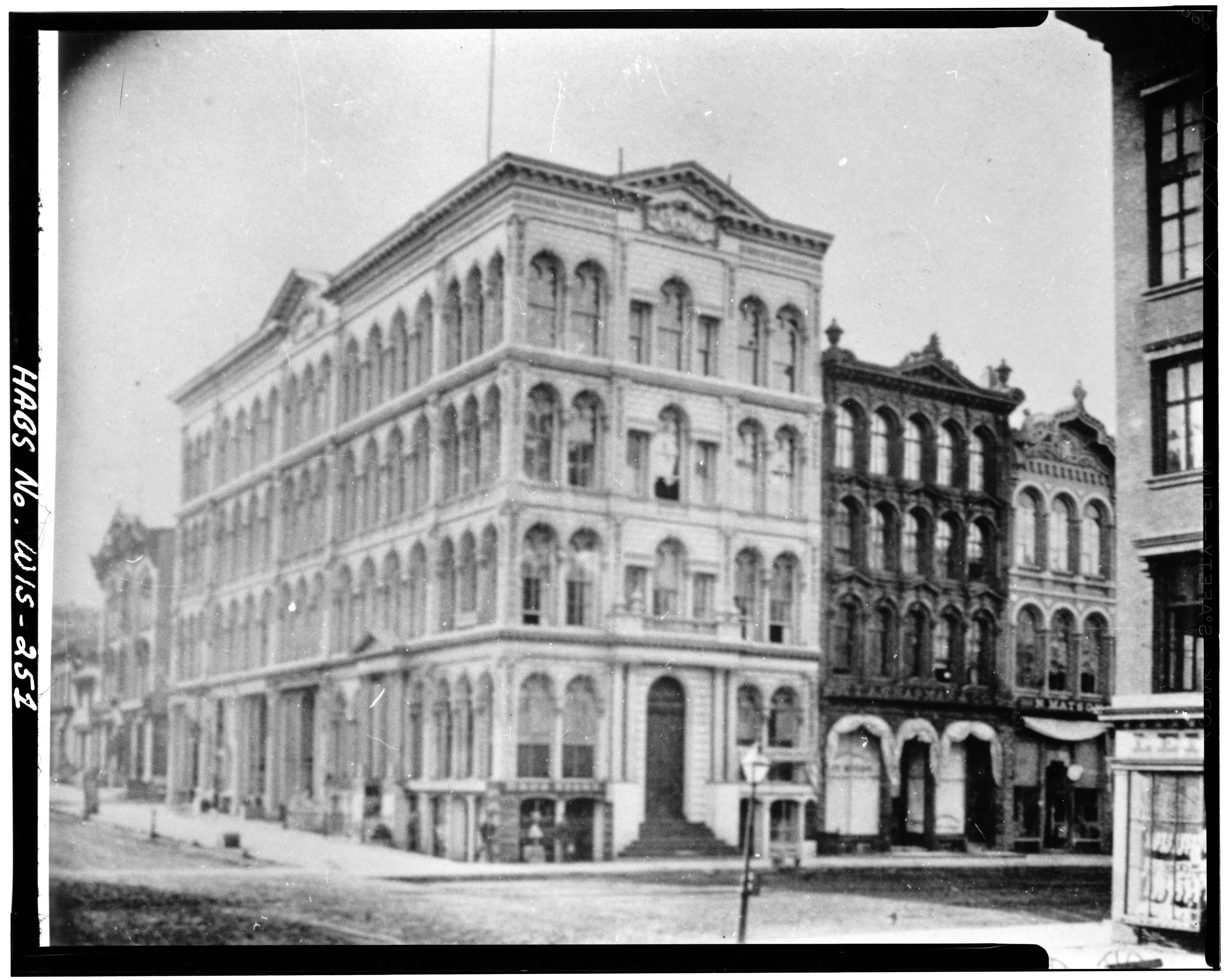

Martin's new building was four stories tall with the basement somewhat exposed at the northwest corner - an Italianate-styled design, with round arches above the windows resting on paired decorative columns and iron surfaces deliberately grooved to look like blocks joined with mortar. At the top was a cornice with a shallow pediment in the center. Beneath the cast iron skin, most of the underlying structure is brick and timber. The main street-level entrance suggested the Roman temple, with its own pediment and entablature resting on pairs of Corinthian columns.

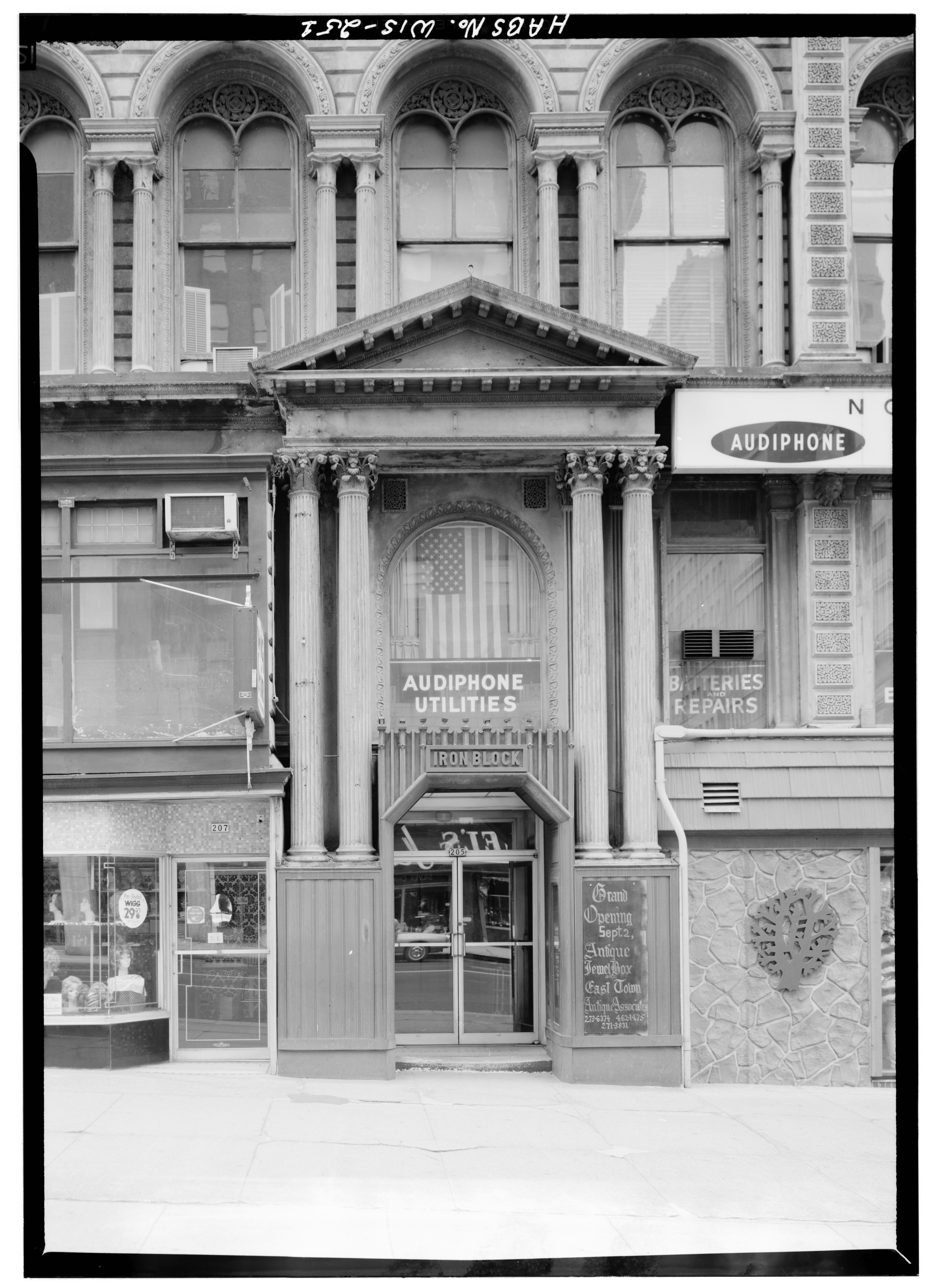

The building was initially called the Excelsior Block, for the Excelsior Lodge of Masons, whose lodge was on the top floor. At street-level, the building housed four or five shops.

Over the years the street-level storefronts have been modified, but the upper stories are largely intact, except that the cornice was cut back and some iron removed. Around 1900 a 5-story brick addition was added on the south side. In 1984 the building was largely restored, both inside and out.

The Historic American Buildings Survey considered the Iron Block "notable as one of Milwaukee's most prominent early commercial buildings, as one of the small number of pre-Civil War structures remaining in the central business district, as the city's chief example of the use of the cast-iron front, and as the work of George H. Johnson, the English-born builder-architect who figured so significantly in the development of building technology a century ago."

== See also ==
- List of Milwaukee landmarks
- National Register of Historic Places listings in Milwaukee, Wisconsin
