= Henry & Marie Harnischfeger House =

German Renaissance Revival style home

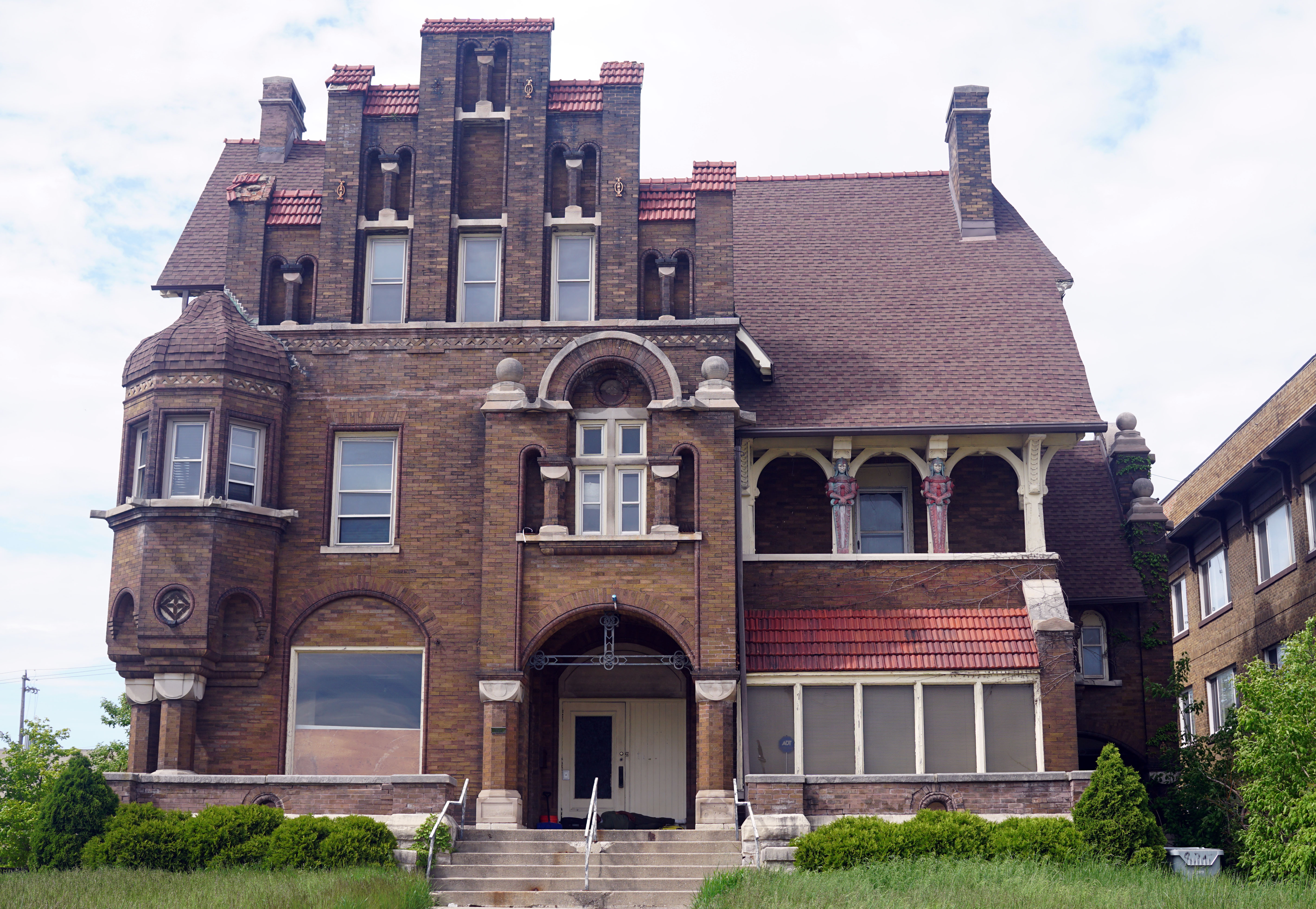
- Henry & Marie Harnischfeger House in 2020
- Interactive map of Henry & Marie Harnischfeger House
- 43.03912°N 87.95694°W
- Location: 3424 W Wisconsin Avenue Milwaukee, WI 53208

History
- Built: 1905
- Built for: Wisconsin industrialist Henry Harnischferger
- Original use: Home

Site notes
- Architect: Eugene R. Liebert
- Architectural style: German Renaissance Revival
- Governing body: Wisconsin Historical Society
- Owner: Retrovision LLC

Henry & Marie Harnischfeger House is a German Renaissance Revival style mansion completed in 1905. The home was built for Wisconsin Industrialist Henry Harnischfeger. In 1991 the City of Milwaukee gave the building a Historical Designation.

== History ==
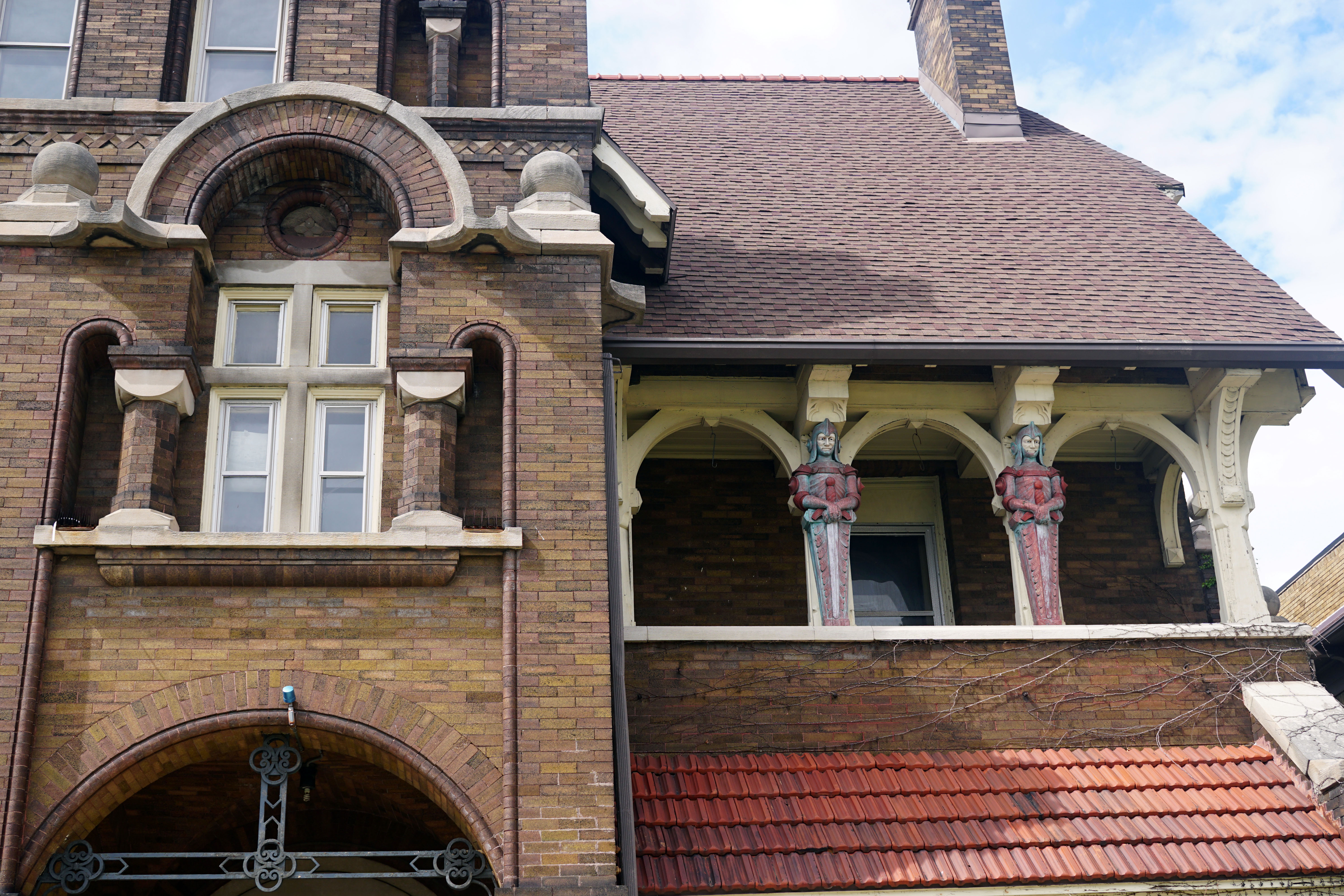
Example of German Renaissance Revival Architectural elements seen on the front/east side of the building

The building was designed by architect Eugene R. Liebert and completed in 1905. The building is an example of German Renaissance Revival style: the builder was Strachota Builders. The building was locally designated a historic building locally designated: 2–15–1983. The Harnischfeger House was built on Grand Avenue in Milwaukee, Wisconsin. The street is now called Wisconsin Avenue.

During WWII the property was majorly remodeled to make what was then just another Old House into dormitory style accommodations for dozens of men coming into Milwaukee to work in the local factories. The grand staircase was replaced with something that could be found in an old School Bldg. The upper rooms were cut up and showers installed. A 3rd floor ballroom was cut into many smaller rooms also. Plumbing pipes have been thrust through the old ceilings with no regard to the original details. Water entry HAD greatly damaged the house in multiple places, esp the Palm Room at the NW corner of the home. The main entrance of the home originally faced EAST... towards 34th St, (where there is now a 1930s Apt. Bldg) with a long carriage way coming from the east to the current portico. The windows on that side were sealed and covered with 1940s wallboard at this time, making the original entrance disappear. Above the portico, on the second floor was a small chapel for the family. Later, first floor drop ceilings were added, obscuring the details in the ceilings, esp. in the men's parlor (SE corner) The carriage house is long gone. A charm of a house, but little of the original details exist. Major renovations in the early 2020s have brought extensive updates to the property.

== Architectural elements ==
the building is a 2-½ story, gable-roofed mansion which was built on limestone. There are numerous projecting and receding elements.

- There are two soldiers holding swords (Atlas (architecture)) on the front of the second floor balcony.
- Corbelled Oriel window
- A recessed entrance
- An arcaded loggia

The building is 8,810sq ft with 13 bedrooms 5.5 bathrooms and 21 total rooms.
