= O. C. Uehling =

American architect

- Born: Otto C. Uehling; July 17, 1865
- Died: December 10, 1947 (aged 82)
- Education: University of Wisconsin–Madison
- Occupation: Architect

Otto C. Uehling (July 17, 1865 – December 10, 1947) was an American engineer and architect working in Milwaukee, Wisconsin.

== Early life and education ==
He graduated from the University of Wisconsin in 1890.

== Career ==
He opened an office on Grove Street in 1892. He later worked from 509 First National Bank Building. His work includes several manufacturing plants including what is now the Phoenix Building, churches, and residences.

In 1894 he partnered with I. Jay Knapp who later moved to Washington state and Oregon. Uehling partnered with Carl L. Linde to form the firm Uehling and Linde. Charles Holst was one of their draftsman. They were included in the book Notable Men of Wisconsin in 1902. Linde went on to have a successful career in Portland, Oregon. Joseph Lindl was a draftsman for him in 1902.

In 1902, he became vice-president of the reorganized Merkel Manufacturing Company (Flying Merkel) that made motorcycles and bicycles. He was also involved with the Wisconsin Ice Machine Company.

== Later life ==
Uehling died on December 10, 1947.

== Work ==
- St. Peter's Evangelical Lutheran Church (Milwaukee, Wisconsin) 1898 Social Hall
- Saint Jacobi Evangelical Lutheran Church (1905) 1321 West Mitchell Street
- Phoenix Knitting Company Plant #4 (1918) at 219 North Milwaukee Street, renamed the Phoenix Building in 1980, part of Milwaukee's Historic Third Ward
- 2757 Oakland Ave. (1901)
- Christensen Engineering Company expansion (1902)
- R.J. Schwab and Sons building (1906) at 612 South 2nd Street
- Tuberculosis sanitorium in Jefferson County, Wisconsin (1918)
- Machine shop for T. L. Smith Machine Co.
- Hummel-Downing Company paper box plant
- Dye manufacturing plant for Universal Aniline Dyes & Chemical Co
- Washington Cutlery Company factory building
- Phoenix Knitting Works building at 311 East Chicago
- St. Stephen's Lutheran Church (1901) at what is now 1136 South 5th Street. A Milwaukee landmark.
- 703-705 Locust Street (1913), Uehling and Kleser
