= Greenfield School (West Allis, Wisconsin) =

- U.S. National Register of Historic Places
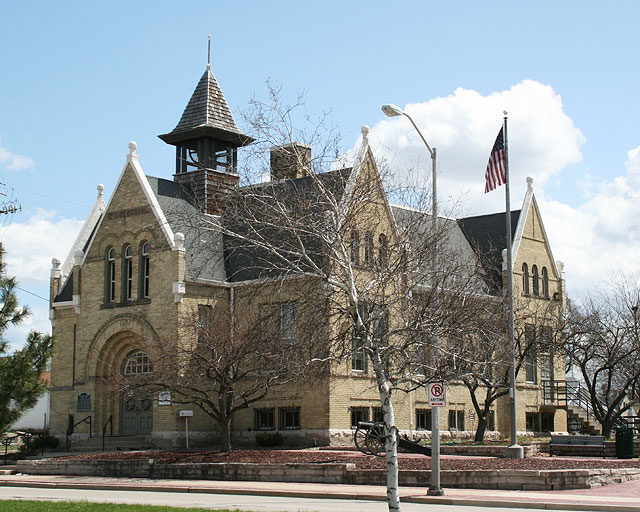
- Greenfield School

- Location within Wisconsin Location within the United States
- Location: 8405 W. National Ave. West Allis, Wisconsin
- Coordinates: 43°0′41″N 88°1′3″W
- Area: less than one acre
- Built: 1887
- Architect: Herman Schnetzky
- Architectural style: Romanesque
- NRHP reference No.: 06000207
- Added to NRHP: March 29, 2006

The Greenfield School in West Allis, Wisconsin was built as a two-room school in 1887, but in an elegant Romanesque Revival style unusual for such buildings. It was added to the National Register of Historic Places in 2006.

== History ==
The first settlers in the area arrived in the 1830s to form a community then called Honey Creek, named for 13 beehives along the stream. In 1835 they built a one-room log schoolhouse on the site of the current Greenfield School on land donated by Reuben Strong, starting out with seven students. In 1861 they replaced that log schoolhouse with a one-room red brick schoolhouse.

In 1887 the red brick school was replaced by the current elaborate building. It was designed by Herman P. Schnetzky, a 1.5-story building with walls of load-bearing cream brick. Its style is Romanesque Revival, with hallmarks being the rough stone of the foundation and the round-arched windows and entry door. Also striking are the grouped windows in the gables, the parapets on the gable ends, and the square bell tower with flared eaves.

The new school had two classrooms instead of one. At this time, people were becoming aware of some of the shortcomings of one-room schools, and the two rooms let the teachers split the elementary grades by age to provide more age-appropriate instruction. Soon they split the rooms again to make four classrooms. A few years later, the school added a high school program, with the students studying physics, history, algebra, geometry, grammar, rhetoric, physiology, English history, the Constitution, arithmetic, and some studying bookkeeping and botany. The first high school students graduated in 1897.

The building functioned as a school until 1923. After closing, it served as the School District Maintenance Department. Later it was used as a greenhouse, a Civil Defense office, and temporarily as offices of a hospital. About 1966 it was taken over by the West Allis Historical Society, restored, and put into use as the West Allis Historical Museum.
