= Baumbach Building =

- U.S. National Register of Historic Places
- U.S. Historic district – Contributing property
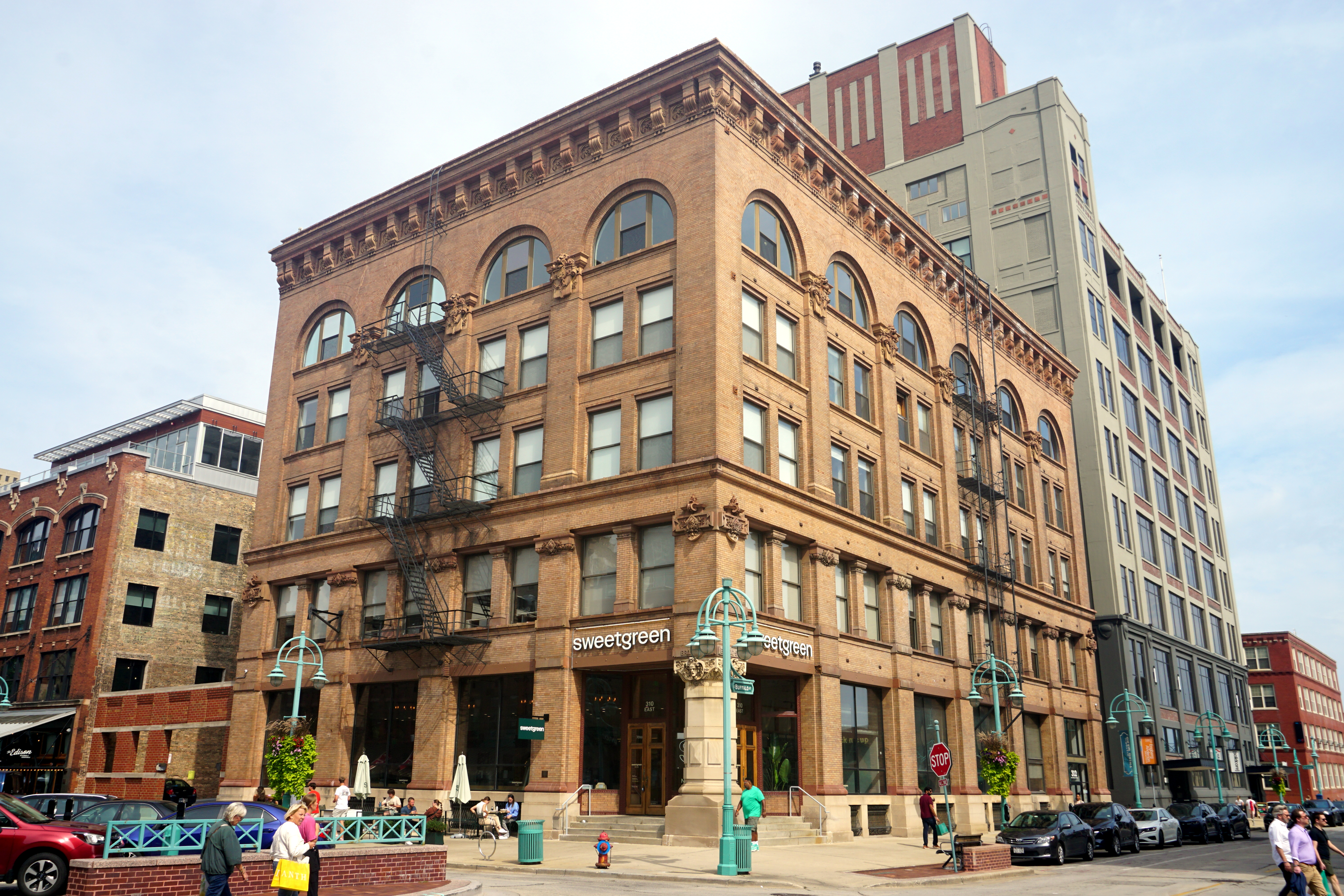

- Location within Wisconsin Location within the United States
- Location: 302 N. Broadway St., Milwaukee, Wisconsin
- Coordinates: 43°2′3″N 87°54′25″W
- Area: less than one acre
- Built: 1900
- Architect: Eugene R. Liebert
- Architectural style: Chicago School
- Part of: Historic Third Ward District (ID84003724)
- NRHP reference No.: 83003403
- Added to NRHP: March 3, 1983

The Baumbach Building, also known as the Midwest Lamp Company or The Buffalo, is a historic building in Milwaukee, Wisconsin, United States. Part of the Historic Third Ward, the five-story building was one of the city's first Chicago School factories.

== History ==
The Baumbach Building was designed by the German American architect Eugene R. Liebert, who was commissioned by Ernest von Baumbach. It was built in the Third Ward, a former residential district which had been largely destroyed in an 1892 fire. In its place, a warehouse district emerged. The five-story building was started in 1899 and completed the next year. The von Baumbachs were a prominent German family in Milwaukee; patriarch Ludwig had been a member of the Frankfurt Parliament and served in Milwaukee as the consul of the German Empire. Ernest was his sixth son and pursued a career in real estate.

The building was first used as a clothes factory by the Cohen Brothers, with 150 employees making clothes for lumberjacks and miners. By 1940 it was used primarily as a warehouse. Starting in 1946 the Midwest Lamp & Novelty Co. used the building for plating, making shades, assembly, and storage.

The building was recognized by the National Park Service with a listing on the National Register of Historic Places on March 3, 1983. On March 8, 1984, the building became a contributing property of the Historic Third Ward District.

== Architecture ==
The building is located on Commission Row, a section of the Third Ward historically dominated by the produce wholesale business. Its design is a blend of an early Chicago School motif with Renaissance Revival influences. The main entrance is recessed 10 feet (3.0 m) behind a light grey stone column. The capital of the column is consistent with German design with carved heads in relief. The Baumbach stands 80 by 120 feet (24 m × 37 m) with four bays on the west side and six bays on the south side. The first floor has large storefront windows while the second, third, and fourth floor windows are double-hung. The fifth floor features round arched windows which are separated with carved lions' heads on a Celtic cross medallion. Carved crowns in a cartouche decorate the second floor corners. The interior was originally a standard warehouse design, but the first floor has since been divided into office space.
