= Valentin Blatz Brewing Company Office Building =

- U.S. National Register of Historic Places
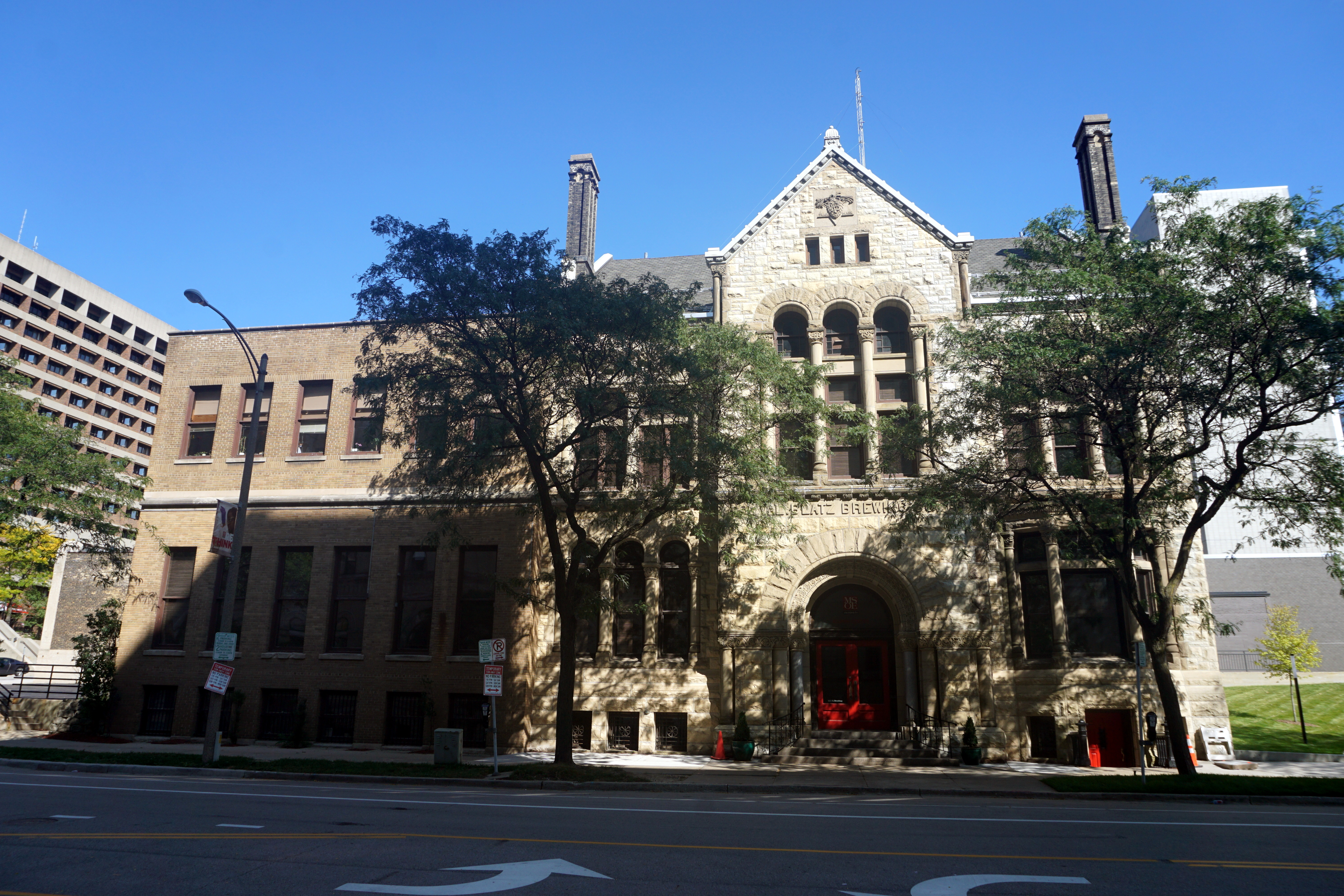
- Valentin Blatz Brewing Company Office Building
- Location: 1120 N. Broadway; Milwaukee, Wisconsin
- Coordinates: 43.04533°N 87.90824°W
- Architect: Herman Schnetzky
- Architectural style: Richardsonian Romanesque
- NRHP reference No.: 83003404
- Added to NRHP: March 31, 1983

The Valentin Blatz Brewing Company Office Building was built in 1890 in Milwaukee, Wisconsin, United States. It was originally home to the offices of the Valentin Blatz Brewing Company. It was designed by architect Paul Schnetzky in Romanesque Revival style and is listed on the National Register of Historic Places.

The building was home at one time to the Beer Baron Restaurant. It features an image painted in the ceiling window that includes Joseph Schlitz, Frederick Miller, Frederick Pabst, and Valentin Blatz with Gottlieb Heileman painted, but in the distance. This is reportedly because Heileman did not build his brewery in Milwaukee. Blatz's face is a cut-out, which could be removed for him to look down upon his workers from his office.

An interesting feature of the building is that it's built to 3/4 scale. Valentin was sensitive about his small stature and had the smaller building designed so that he didn't feel overwhelmed by the typical large office buildings of the time.

The office building features a three-story walk-in safe.

The building today is owned and operated by the Milwaukee School of Engineering (MSOE) and known as the Alumni Partnership Center. It houses the MSOE Marketing, Alumni Affairs, and Development departments. It serves as a meeting place for MSOE alumni.
