= Saint John's Evangelical Lutheran Church (Milwaukee, Wisconsin) =

Historic church in Wisconsin, United States

- St. John's Evangelical Lutheran Church Complex
- U.S. National Register of Historic Places
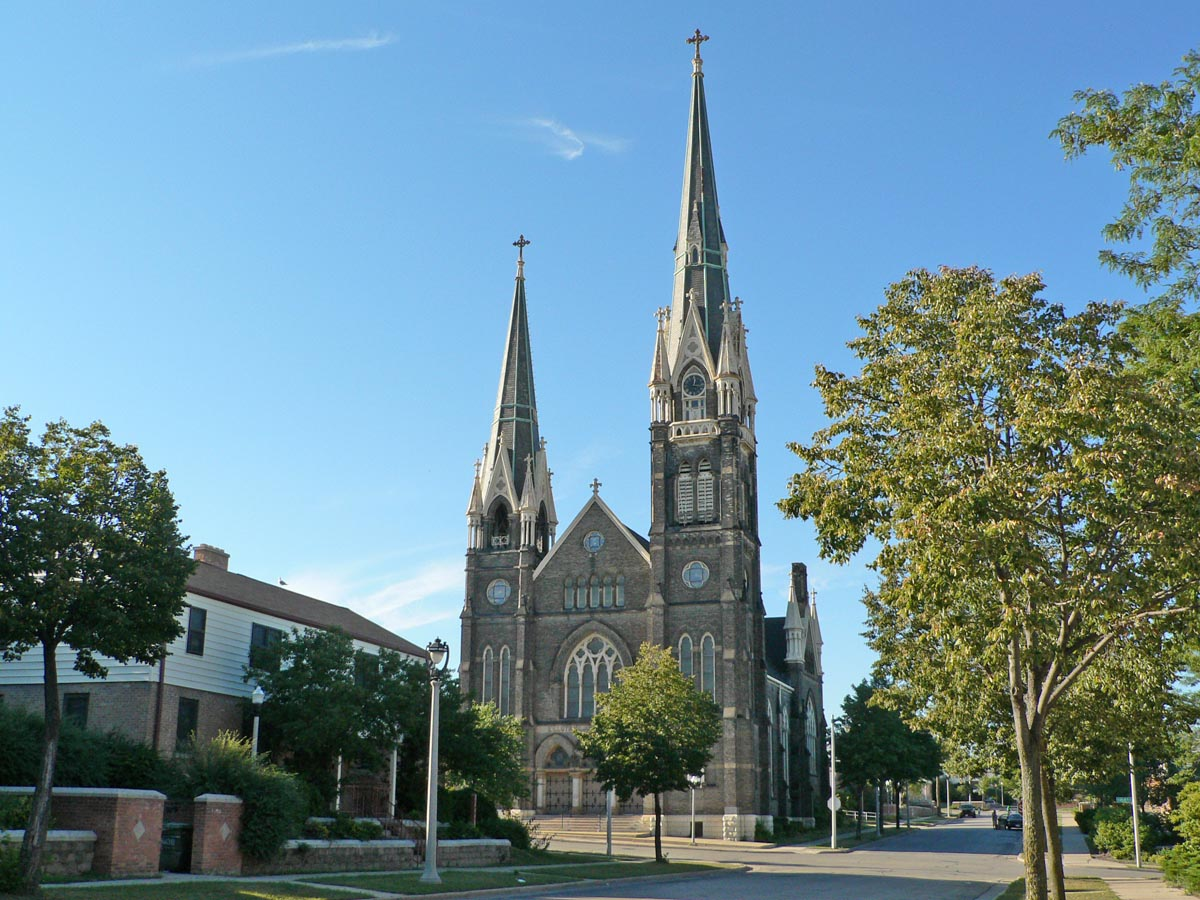
- St. John's Evangelical Lutheran Church
- Location: 804–816 W. Vliet St. Milwaukee, Wisconsin
- Coordinates: 43°2′55.72″N 87°55′19.01″W
- Built: 1889
- Architect: Schnetzky & Liebert
- Architectural style: Gothic Revival
- NRHP reference No.: 92000459
- Added to NRHP: May 18, 1992

St. John's Evangelical Lutheran Church is a Gothic Revival-styled Lutheran church built in 1889 in Milwaukee, Wisconsin by a congregation with German roots. In 1992, the church and associated buildings were listed on the National Register of Historic Places. It is also designated a Milwaukee Landmark. The church is an active parish of the Wisconsin Evangelical Lutheran Synod (WELS), a denomination of Confessional Lutheranism.

== History ==
St. John's congregation was founded December 4, 1848, by German immigrants, who called themselves Evangelische Luth. St. Johanneskirche. In 1850, they moved into the former Trinity Episcopal Church at the corner of Fourth and Highland Avenue. Members of the church, along with neighboring Trinity Evangelical Lutheran Church and Grace Lutheran, helped seed other Lutheran churches in the area, including St. Peter's. In the 1850s there were discussions to merge St. John's and Trinity, but theological differences prevented the merger. In 1857, St. John's joined the Wisconsin Synod. St. Johanneskirche grew for years, building schools in 1871 and 1877. By 1889, the congregation exceeded 2,500 members, and it was time for a new, larger building.

St. John's hired Herman Paul Schnetzky, himself a German immigrant from Wriezen, to design the new church. He and his understudy Eugene R. Liebert designed it in a High Victorian Gothic style similar to what was popular in Germany at the time, perhaps taking cues from the tower of St. Peter's Church in Leipzig. It was built in 1889-90 by Johann Langenberger. As with the Trinity Church building, it features landmark spires of unequal height, one 127 feet (39 m) and the other 197 feet (60 m). The taller steeple houses three bells, weighing more than 6 short tons (5.4 t). The main block of the church is gable-roofed with cream brick walls pierced by tall Gothic-arched windows. Inside, the auditorium is 2.5 stories tall, seating 1100, with a center-aisle layout and the apse at the north end, with an elaborate carved reredos and an elevated pulpit. The NRHP nomination considers St. John's to be important as an illustration of how Milwaukee's German-American architects were influenced by German architecture of the same period. The church is considered to be one of the finest examples of German Lutheran church architecture in the United States.

Also in 1889, the congregation built a parsonage designed by Schnetzky. The parsonage is two stories, cream brick, in rather simple Queen Anne architectural style. The caretaker's house was built in 1914, a side-gabled bungalow with stuccoed walls.

St. John's conducted services solely in German until 1908. In that year services in English were added. The German services continued until 1985.

Since its founding, St. John's has been the site of a number historical events including the founding of the Evangelical Lutheran Synodical Conference of North America in 1872. It has also hosted numerous Milwaukee and synod church events including the 2016 and 2019 Reformation Rally for the Urban Conference of Wisconsin Synod Churches in Milwaukee.

In 2015, the former caretaker's cottage underwent a restoration and now serves as the congregation's fellowship center. The church's organ was first built by Carl Barckhoff in 1890, and was rebuilt and enlarged by Wangerin-Weickhardt in 1919. Organ builder J. J. Miller, a member of the congregation has been actively working to restore and repair the organ.

The congregation was served by vacancy pastors from 2019 to 2021 until hiring a full-time pastor.

== Photographs ==
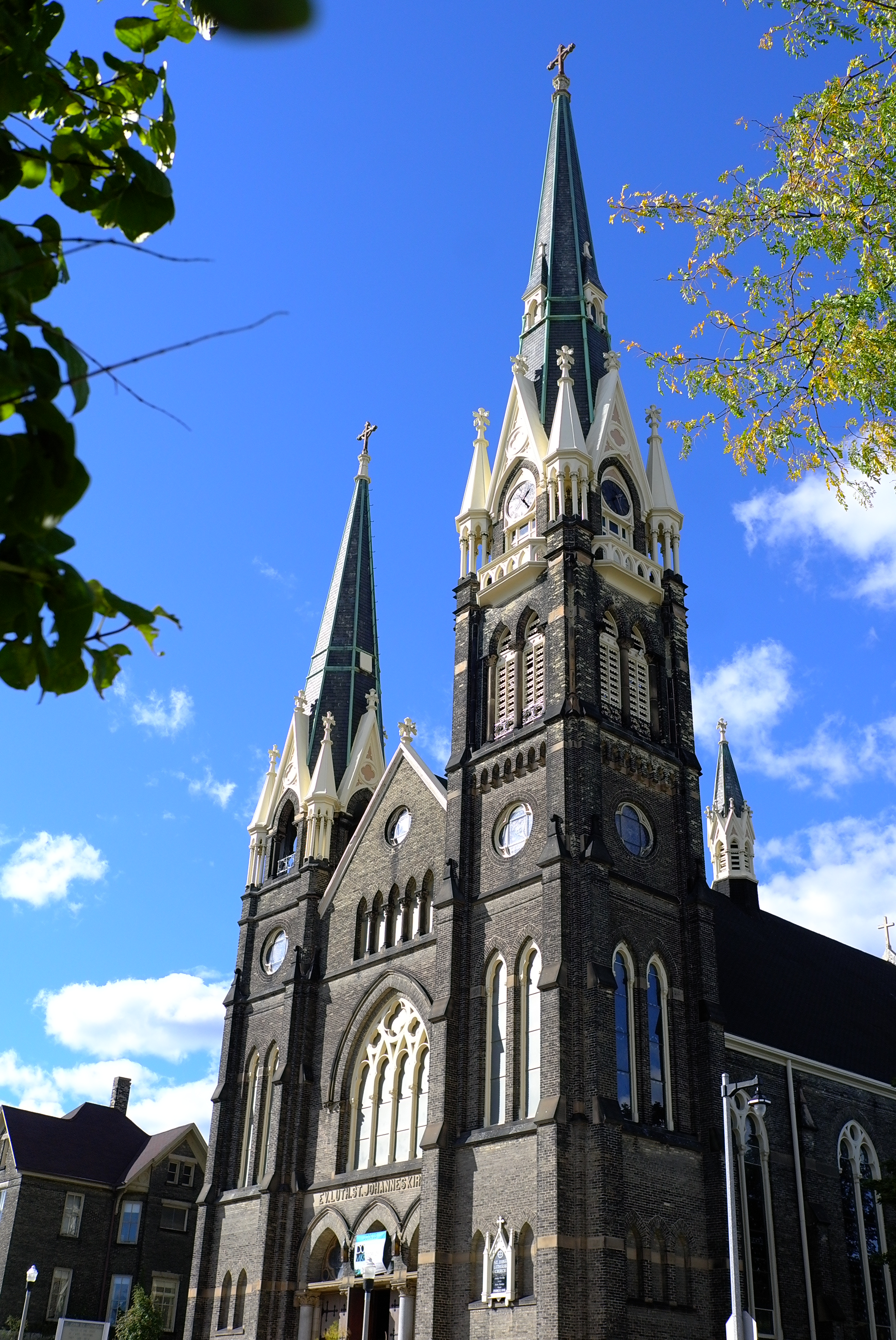
Exterior view

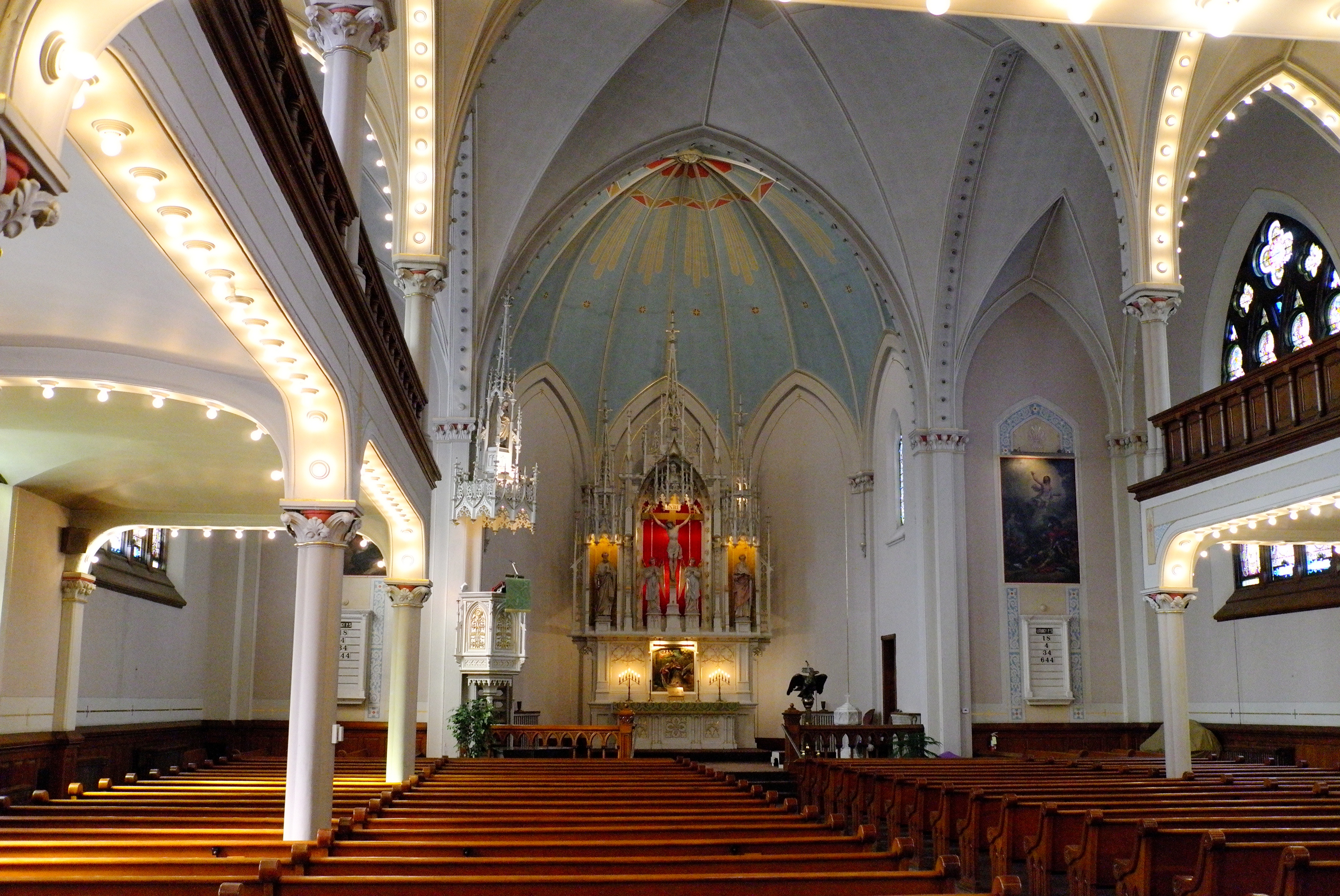
Interior - northern view

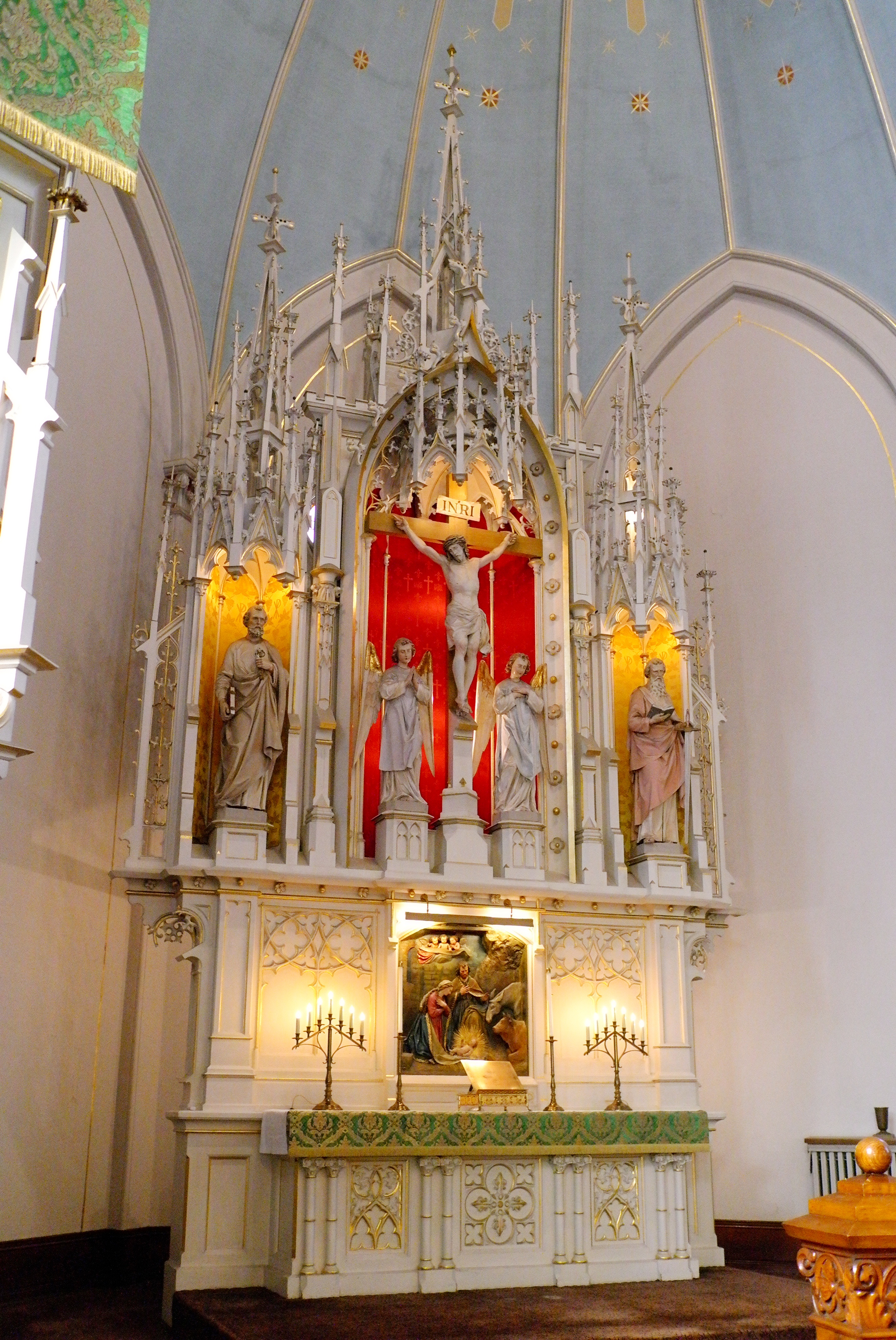
Altar

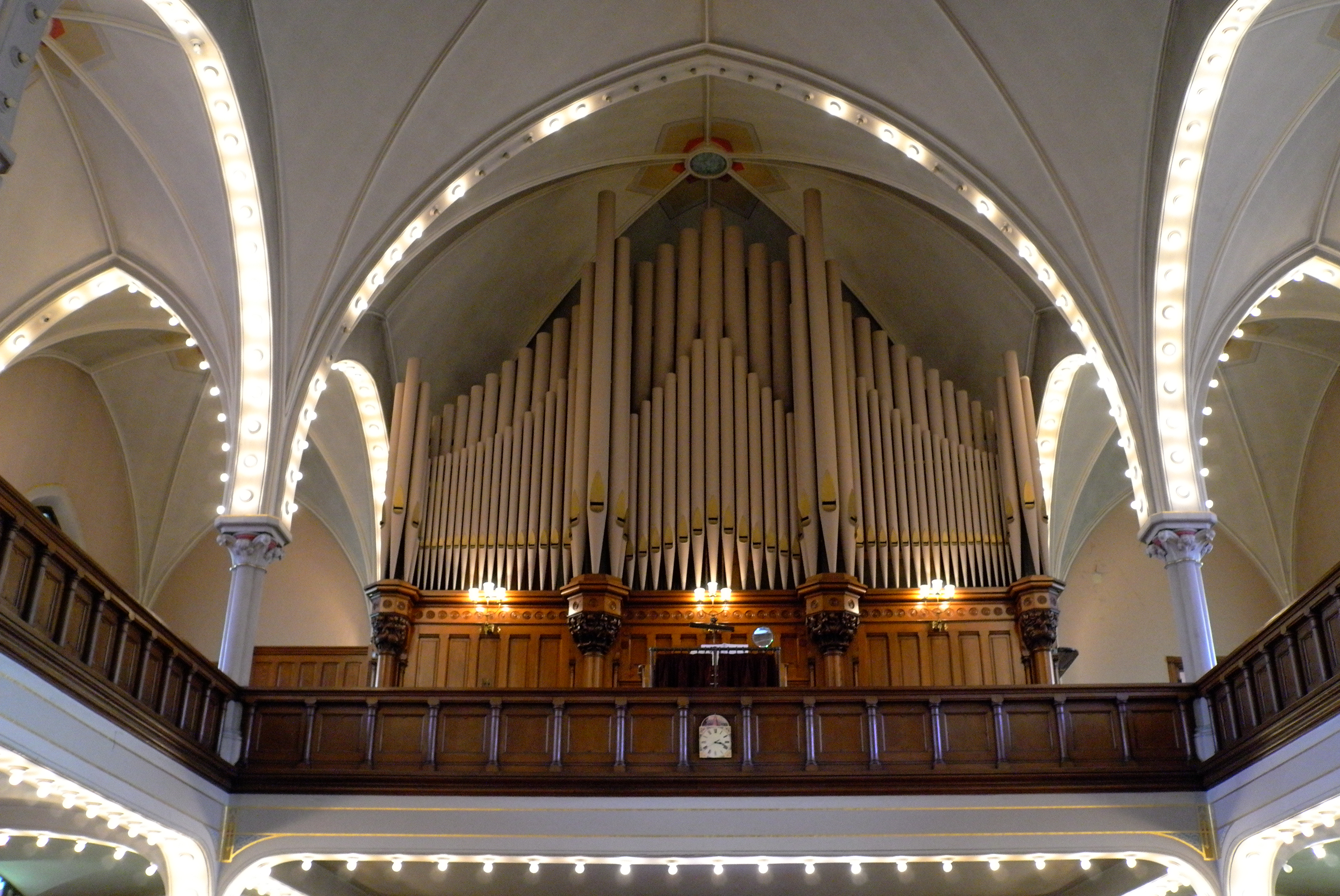
Balcony and organ

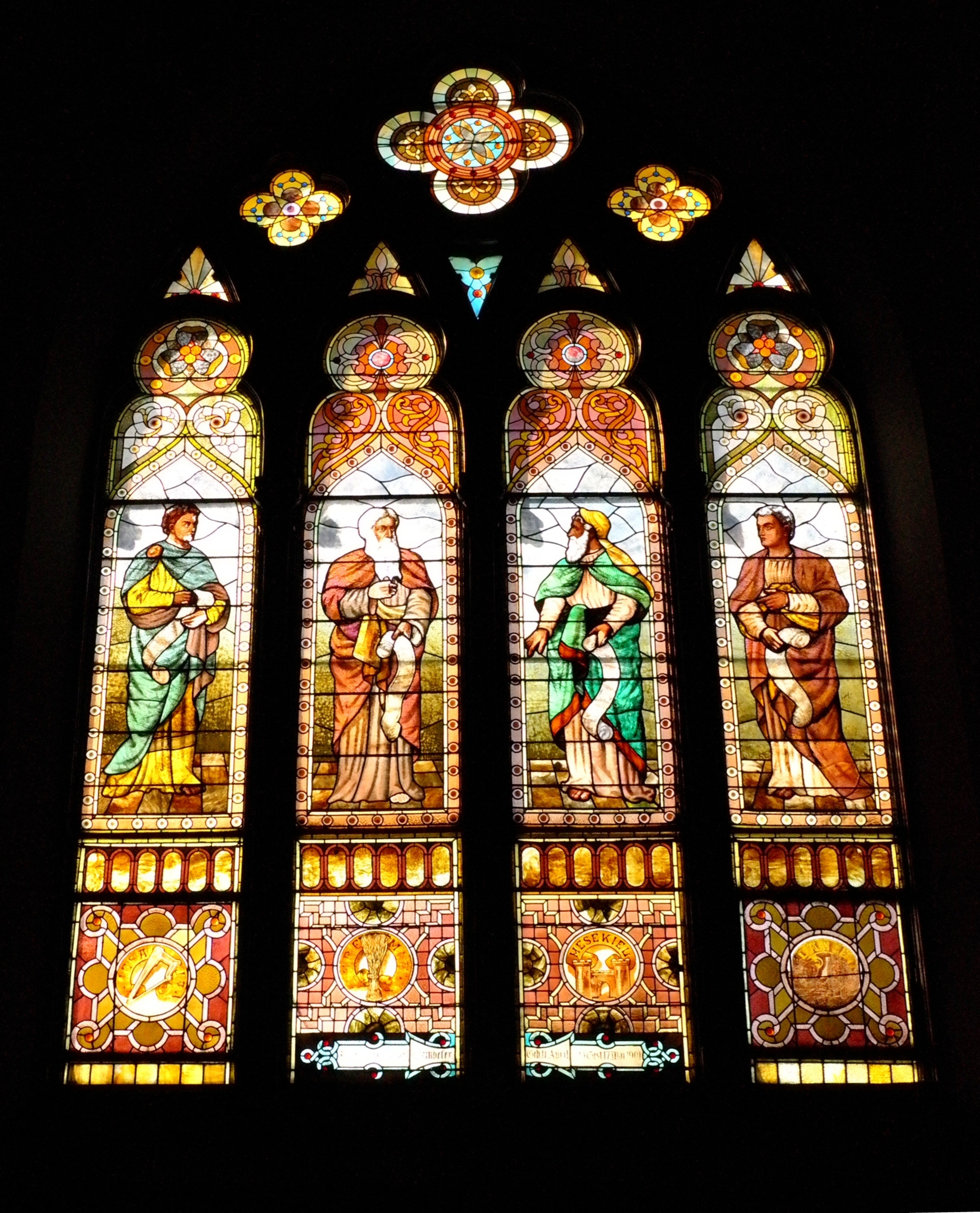
Window

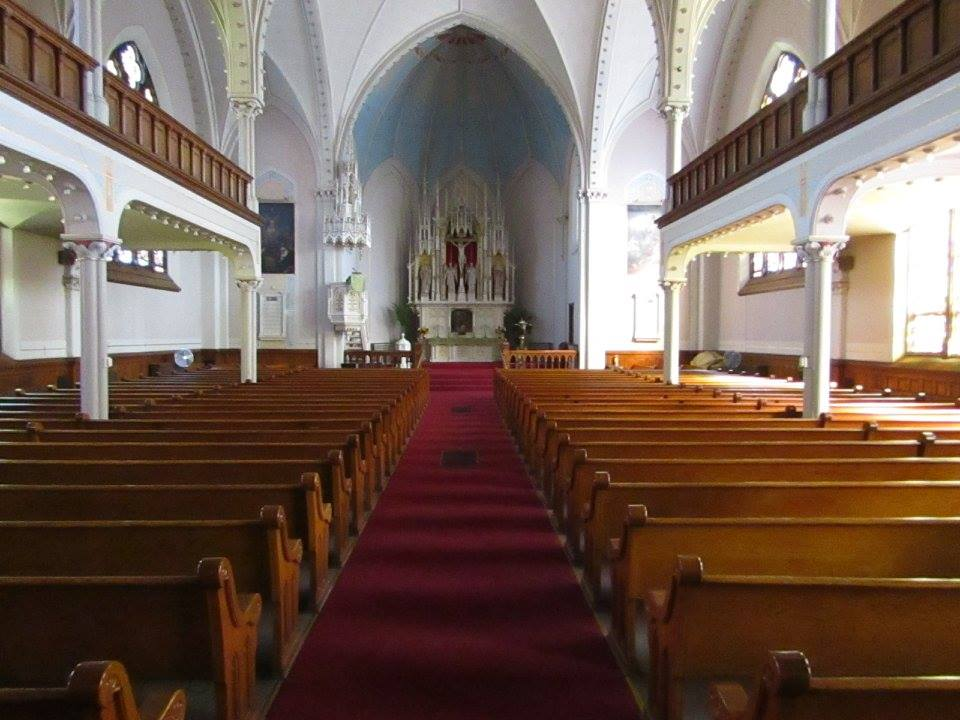
Nave

Clock tower

Parsonage

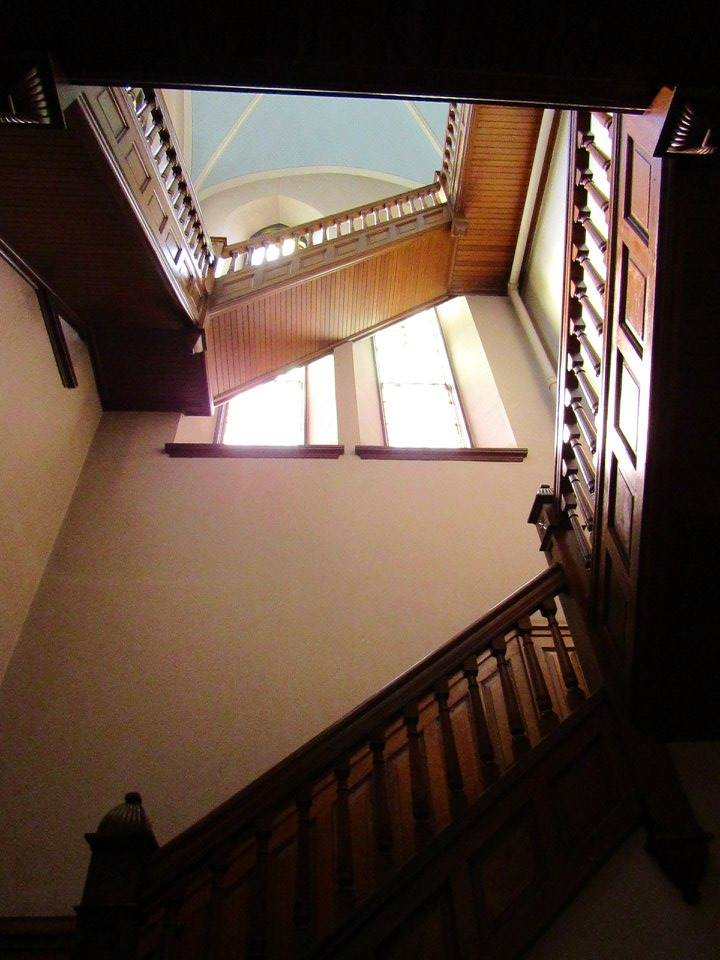
Balcony stairway

Balcony and organ

The Four Gospels Window

Caretaker's cottage
