= Eugene R. Liebert =

German-American architect (1866–1945)

- Born: Eugene R. Liebert; April 27, 1866; Berlin, Kingdom of Prussia, German Confederation
- Died: April 27, 1945 (aged 79); Milwaukee, Wisconsin, United States
- Occupation: Architect
- Children: Walter F. Liebert; Carl Liebert
- Projects: Saint John's Evangelical Lutheran Church

Eugene R. Liebert (April 27, 1866 – April 27, 1945) was a German-American architect who is known for his works in Milwaukee, Wisconsin. Liebert was active designing buildings in the 19th century.

== Career ==
Eugene R. Liebert was born in Berlin in 1866. He emigrated to Milwaukee, Wisconsin, in 1883, where he found work with a relative in the Trostel & Gallun tannery. The next year, Liebert took a position as a draftsman with Henry C. Koch. When Herman Schnetzky left Koch's office to start his own architectural firm, Liebert followed him as his foreman. In 1891, Liebert was admitted as a partner. Liebert left to form his own architectural office in 1897. Liebert was a popular choice among Milwaukee Germans, and his work strongly reflects his German heritage.

== Personal ==
Two of Liebert's sons, Walter F. and Carl, worked with him. Liebert was active as an architect until his death on April 27, 1945. The Albert O. Trostel House at 3200 North Lake Drive was considered his masterpiece, but it was demolished following a 1935 fire.

== List of works ==
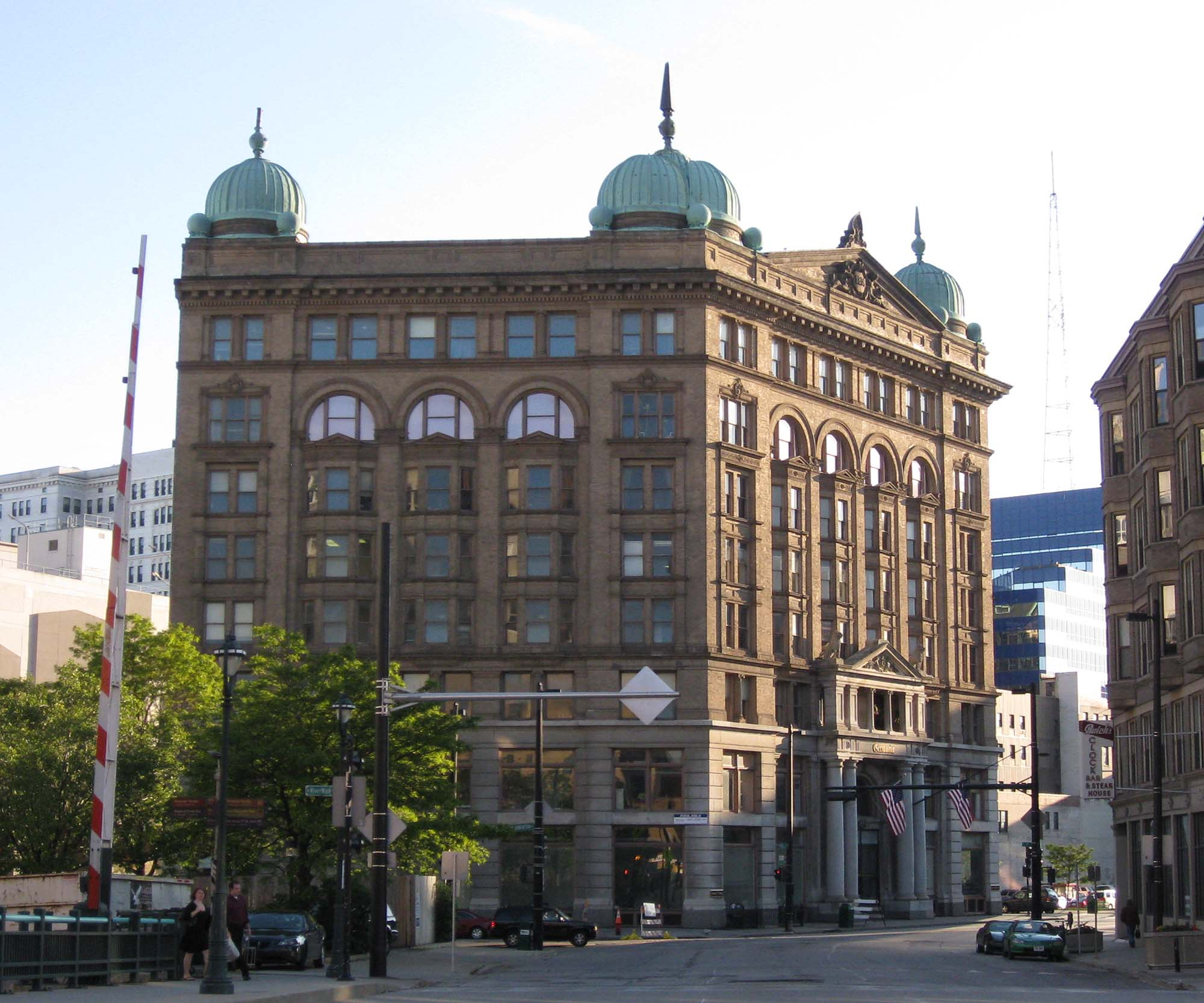
The Germania Building (1896) in Milwaukee, Wisconsin, designed by German-born architects Herman Schnetzky & Eugene R. Liebert

All buildings are in Milwaukee unless otherwise noted

- Eugene R. Liebert House, 1887
- Saint John's Evangelical Lutheran Church (Schnetzky & Liebert), 1889
- McGeoch Building (Schnetzky & Liebert), 1890
- F. Mayer Boot and Shoe Company Building, 1892–1899
- J. P. Kissinger Block (Schnetzky & Liebert), 1893
- Lohman Livery Stable (Schnetzky & Liebert), 1893
- St. Michael’s Church (Schnetzky & Liebert), 1893
- Ernst Pommer House (Schnetzky & Liebert), 1895
- Germania Building (Schnetzky & Liebert), 1896
- West Division High School (Schnetzky & Liebert), 1896
- St. Stephen Lutheran School (Schnetzky & Liebert)
- Notre Dame Hall, Elm Grove, Wisconsin, 1898
- Red Star Yeast Plant addition, 1899
- Baumbach Building, 1900
- Concordia College Administration Building, 1900
- Fred Kraus House, 1902
- Henry & Marie Harnischfeger House, 1905
- Maria Angelorum Chapel, La Crosse, Wisconsin, 1906
- Albert O. Trostel House, 1908
