= Lohman Funeral Home and Livery Stable =

United States historic place in Milwaukee, Wisconsin

- U.S. National Register of Historic Places
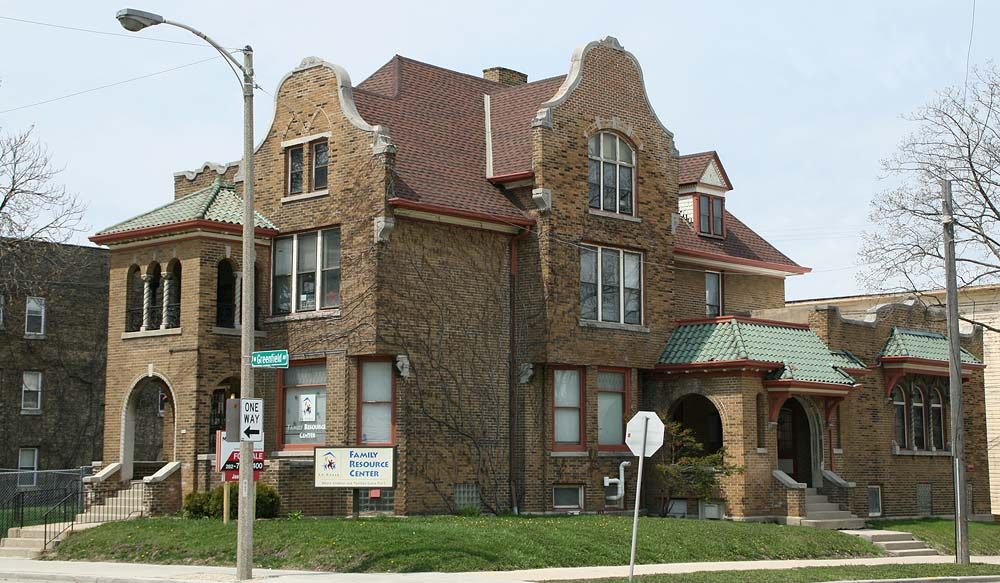
- Lohman Funeral Home
- Location: 840 W. Greenfield and 1325 S. Eighth; Milwaukee, Wisconsin
- Built: 1890/1893
- NRHP reference No.: 88000220
- Added to NRHP: March 17, 1988

The Lohnam Funeral Home and Livery Stable are located in Milwaukee, Wisconsin. In 1988, the site was added to the National Register of Historic Places. According to its application, it is an "example of a 19th century commercial livery stable in the day".

== History ==
Louis Bohne was a south-side businessman, a founder of the Excelsior Publishing Company in Milwaukee, a founder of the German Catholic Henni Social Club, and a steamship agent. In 1890 he had the house which is now the funeral home built as a private home for himself, but it looked quite different from now, clad in clapboard and designed in the then-popular Queen Anne style by Paul Schnetzky. That style is still visible in the complex hip roof peeking out from behind the shaped parapets. In 1893, the large stable was added behind the house, designed by Schnetzky and Eugene R. Liebert, and also in Queen Anne style. Bohne may have built the stable to serve as a livery stable to provide horses and carriages for his steamship clients. In 1894 he suddenly sold his new home and stable, possibly a result of the Panic of 1893.

In the following 20 years, the house and stable went through a number of owners and renters. Herman and Henry Lohman rented the stable in 1896 for their livery business. In 1918 Archibald Lohman bought both buildings to house his funeral home. Just as many cabinet makers who built coffins transitioned to undertaking, it's possible that the Lohmans rented out horse-drawn hearses, expanding into more funeral services from there.

Back in the 1880s, funerals were typically conducted in the home, with an embalmer coming to the house of the deceased to do his work. A local cabinet maker built the coffin. Close family and friends met for a small service in the home. Then the body was carried by a rented horse-drawn hearse to the church for a ceremony, and then on to the cemetery for the burial. By the 1890s, full-service funeral homes were beginning to appear in Milwaukee, with more space than the typical home. A Schroth was one of the first, advertising his funeral parlor with livery service in 1898.

Archibald Lohman and his family lived on the second floor of the house, with the funeral parlor at ground level. About 1919 Lohman replaced his horse-drawn hearses with funeral cars, beginning to use the stable as a garage. (Horse stalls remained in the stable's basement.) In 1931 the Lohmans radically remodeled the exterior of the house into a less somber and more trendy Mediterranean Revival-style, with brown-brick veneer, shaped gables, cast stone trim, and Spanish tile roof. The remodel also added a chapel at the rear of the house.

The stables were closed in 1973. The house has since been converted to use by non-profit family service agency La Causa, Inc.

The stable was the last remaining stable in Milwaukee to be designed by an architect, and was the subject of a May 2011 story in the Milwaukee Journal Sentinel. It described the history of the stable and documented that the building needed major repairs including beam replacement and a new roof. The city of Milwaukee had ordered that the building be razed. The publicity caused several people to approach the owners about other purposes for the stable, including moving it to other locations. All of the ideas fell through and eventually furniture-maker and woodworker Mark Lien purchased the stable for one dollar. As of October 2012, he is dismantling the building and placing the wood in a nearby suburb, while he is looking for a suitable site to reconstruct the building for use as a woodworking shop.

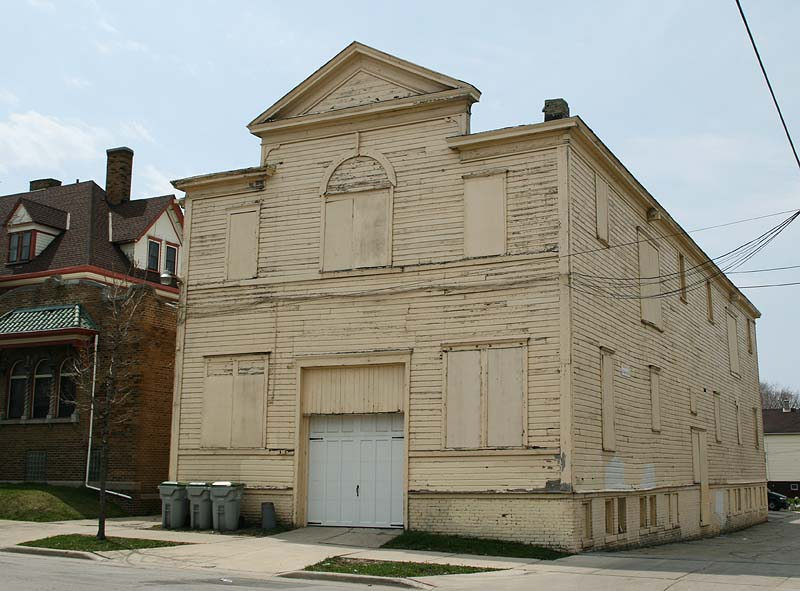
Lohman Livery Stable
