= Germania Building =

- U.S. National Register of Historic Places
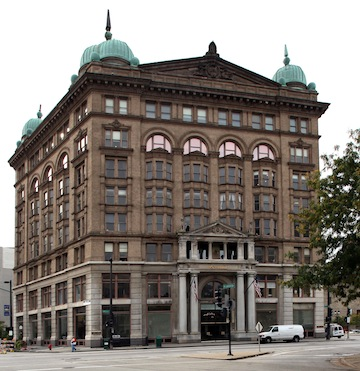
- Germania Building

- Location within Wisconsin Location within the United States
- Location: 135 W. Wells St., Milwaukee, Wisconsin
- Coordinates: 43°2′23″N 87°54′45″W
- Built: 1896
- Architect: Schnetzky & Liebert
- Architectural style: Classical Revival, Beaux Arts, Beaux Arts Classicism
- NRHP reference No.: 83003405
- Added to NRHP: July 07, 1983

The Germania Building is an eight-story historic Beaux-Arts/Classical Revival building at 135 W. Wells St. in Milwaukee, Wisconsin. It was built in 1896 for George Brumder to house the headquarters of his burgeoning publishing empire. In 1983 it was listed on the National Register of Historic Places.

== Description ==
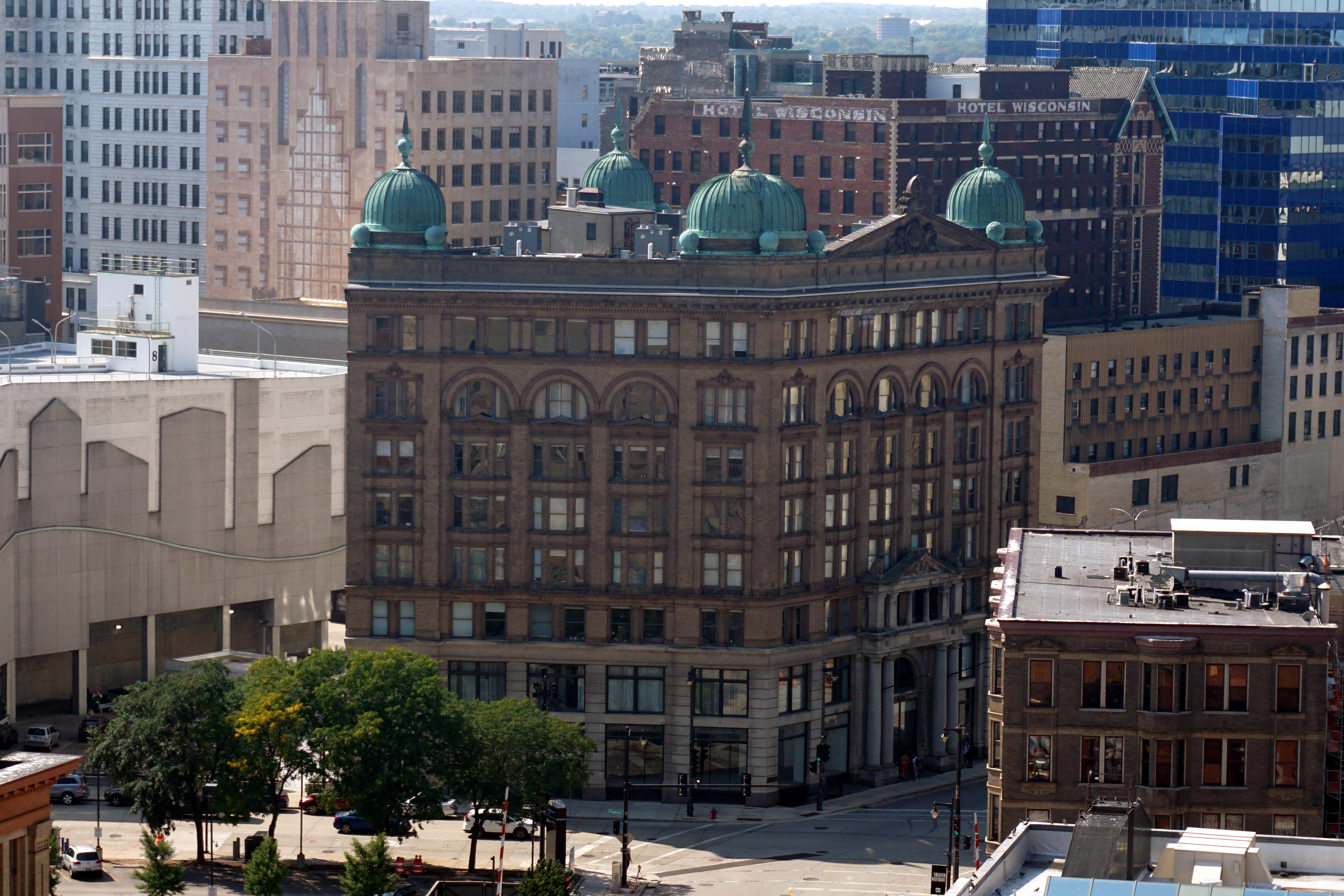
Germania Building viewed from Milwaukee City Hall

The 8-story, 117,752-square-foot (10,939.5 m^{2}) building was designed by German-born architects Schnetzky & Liebert and was, at the time of its construction, the largest office building in the city of Milwaukee. In addition to its characteristic copper pickelhaube domes, the building was graced by a 10-foot (3.0 m)-tall, three-ton bronze statue of Germania on a pediment over the door.

In 1918, the building's name was changed to the Brumder Building in response to anti-German sentiment during World War I, and the statue was removed discreetly in the night. Efforts to trace the fate of the statue, which was stored for a while by sculptor Cyril Colnik, have proven futile, with one theory claiming that it was melted down for scrap during World War II, and another speculating that it may have gone to the Smithsonian Institution, and possibly still be there.

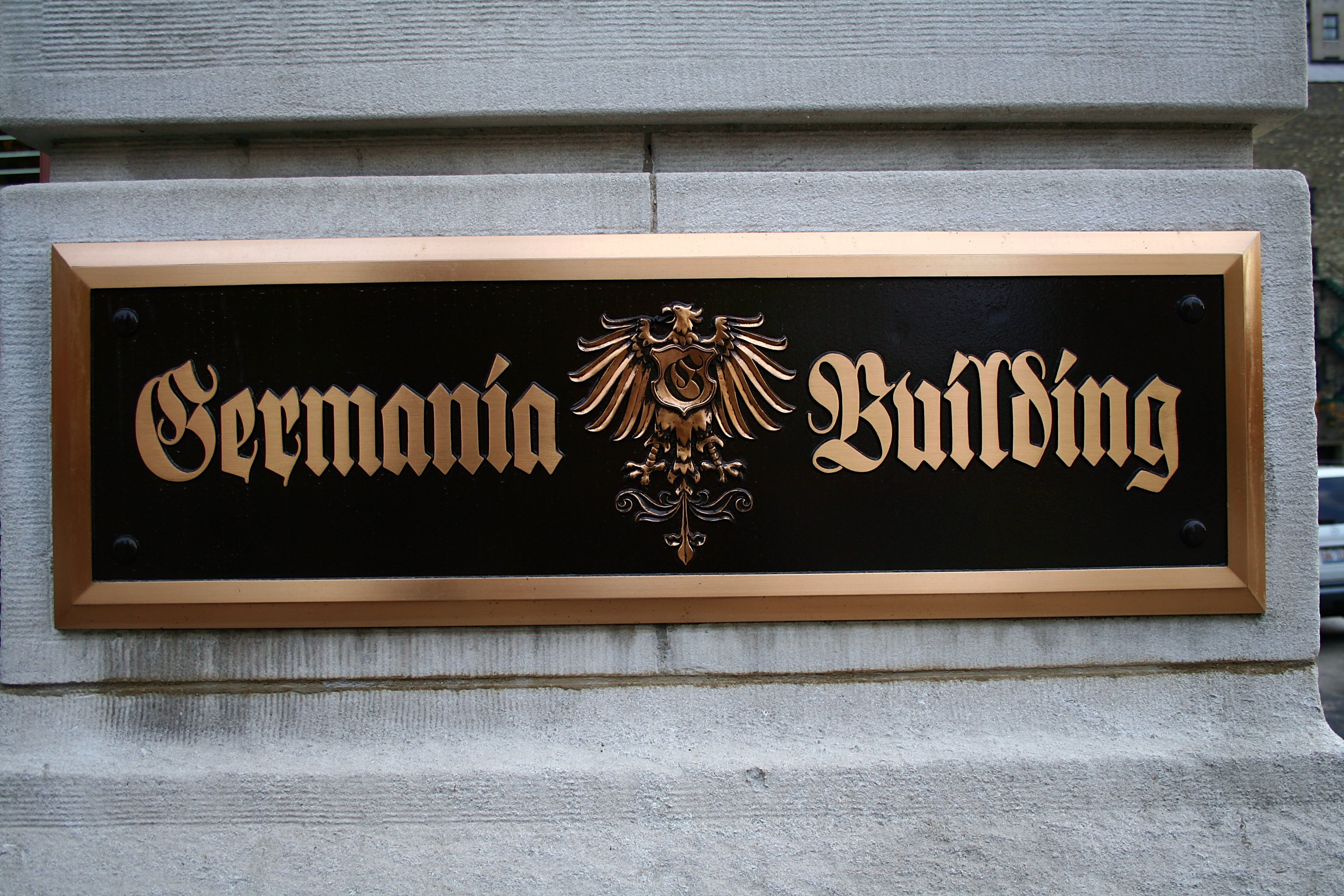
Germania Building Plaque

Seventeen years after Brumder's death in 1910, the printing presses were removed from the basement levels of the building, giving the city its first underground parking garage. The name was changed back to the Germania Building after a significant renovation in 1981. It was placed on the National Register of Historic Places in July 1983.

In 1968 the Brumder Building was the scene of a significant protest against the war in Vietnam. Nine Milwaukee draft boards maintained their offices on the second floor. On the evening of September 24 fourteen activists entered and removed about 10,000 files. Those files were then carried outside across Wells Street, to the area now known as Postman Square, and burned.

In early 2007, the building was sold to a Milwaukee-based investor group led by Santino "Sonny" Bando, for slightly more than $4 million (approx. $44/sq. ft.) from a suburban-Chicago-based investment trust. The building had suffered a decline in tenants and a foreclosure sale in 1990 but was, at the time of the sale, 95% occupied, according to Bando. One of the reasons Bando cited for buying the building was that he and his investors also own another of downtown Milwaukee's historic office buildings, the Iron Block Building (205 E. Wisconsin Ave.), which they bought in 2004. Bando said he likes those types of buildings "because you can't really build them anymore."

== See also ==
- List of Milwaukee landmarks
- National Register of Historic Places listings in Milwaukee, Wisconsin
