= Saint Stephen Evangelical Lutheran Church of Milwaukee =

Saint Stephen Evangelical Lutheran Church
- Iglesia Luterana San Esteban
- Die Evangelische-Lutherische St. Stephanus-Gemeinde
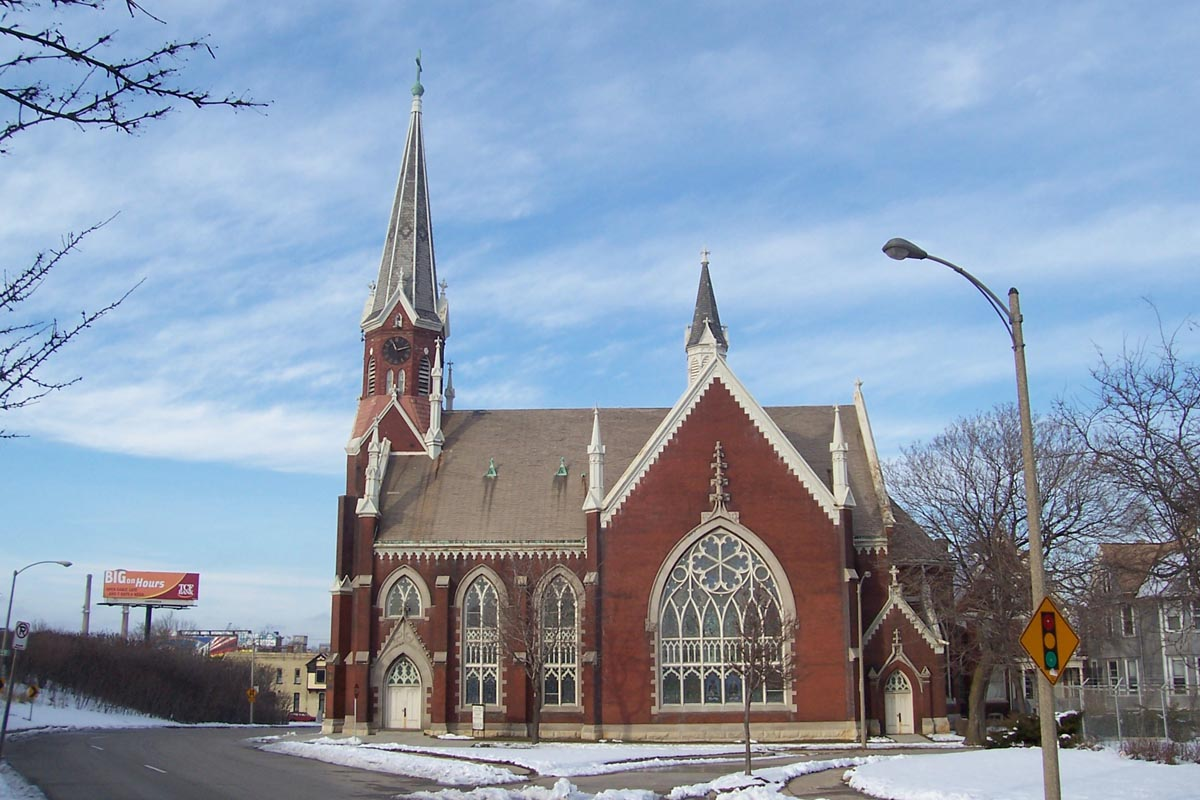
- Saint Stephen Evangelical Lutheran Church
- 43.0193°N 87.9164°W
- Location: 1136 South Fifth Street; Milwaukee, Wisconsin
- Country: United States
- Denomination: Lutheran Church–Missouri Synod
- Website: saintstephenlc.com

History
- Founded: 1853

Architecture
- Heritage designation: Milwaukee Landmark
- Architect: Otto Uehling
- Style: Gothic Revival
- Years built: 1901–1902

Administration
- District: South Wisconsin District of the LCMS

St. Stephen Lutheran Church, or Iglesia Luterana San Esteban, is a designated Milwaukee Landmark. It is in the historic Walker's Point district of Milwaukee, Wisconsin.

== Dedication ==
Saint Stephen Evangelical Lutheran Church was dedicated to Saint Stephen, the first martyr of Christianity and venerated saint of the Church.

== History ==
St. Stephen's was originally established as a mission church called Die Evangelische-Lutherische St. Stephanus-Gemeinde in 1853. It was organized by members of Trinity Evangelical Lutheran Church of the Lutheran Church–Missouri Synod to serve parishioners located south of the Menomonee River, and quartered in an old abandoned school building near 3rd and National Avenue. The congregation was officially founded in 1854 and was composed mostly of German immigrants.

In 1857, the congregation moved to 5th and Mineral Street, where a church was built for $2,200 plus $650 for land. An accompanying school building was erected in 1865.

Due to an increase in membership, a larger building was soon needed. The old frame church was sold to St. Stanislaus Catholic Church for $4,500 and moved to a new location. A lot on the corner of 5th and Scott Street was purchased for $1,900 and a new church built in 1866 for $20,000. A tower was later added in 1879, containing a four faced clock installed by E. Howard & Co. of Boston, Massachusetts.

With the need for extensive repairs looming by 1901, it was decided to raze the building while incorporating the tower into a new structure. Architects Otto Uehling and George Griswold drew up plans for the present church building which cost $43,000 to construct. It is of Gothic design and built using red brick trimmed with limestone. The tower was also resurfaced in these materials. The church was one of the first steel-masonry structures in Milwaukee.

In July 1902, the first organ was dedicated. The present organ, a three-manual Wangerin organ with 2,100 pipes, was installed in 1941. After more than a year of renovation and the installation of a new console, the organ was re-dedicated in 2004 as part of the celebration of the 150th anniversary of the congregation.

An influx of Mexican immigrants to the area began in the 1930s during a labor shortage experienced by many of the local tanneries. This, along with the German-American population following the urban sprawl of the 1950s, helped the area to become predominantly Hispanic. In 1964, St. Stephen's was designated a Spanish Mission Church and began offering services in Spanish. Services in English had been introduced in the 1920s.
