= St. Peter's Evangelical Lutheran Church (Milwaukee, Wisconsin) =

Historic church in Wisconsin, United States

- Saint Peter's Evangelical Lutheran Church
- U.S. National Register of Historic Places
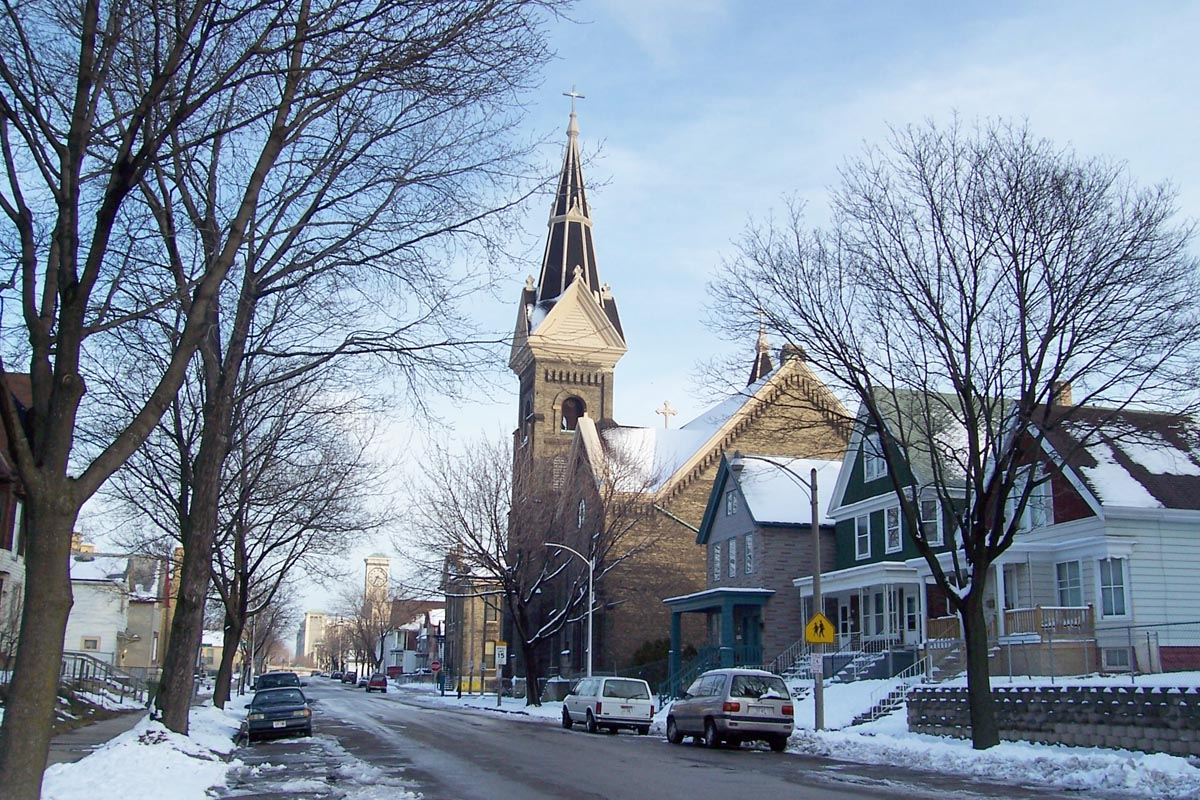
- St. Peter's Evangelical Lutheran Church
- Location: 1204, 1213, 1214, and 1215 S. Eighth St. Milwaukee, Wisconsin
- Nearest city: Milwaukee
- Coordinates: 43°1′7.95″N 87°55′17.12″W
- Built: 1885
- Architect: Andrew Elleson
- Architectural style: Victorian Gothic
- NRHP reference No.: 87001736
- Added to NRHP: September 25, 1987

St. Peter's Evangelical Lutheran Church, or Iglesia Luterana San Pedro, is a historic church complex located in the Walker's Point neighborhood of Milwaukee, Wisconsin. Its buildings are listed on the National Register of Historic Places.

== History ==
St. Peter's congregation (Evangelisch Lutherischen St. Peters Gemeinde) was founded February 14, 1860, by German immigrants, with 34 charter members. In 1861, the congregation bought a frame building for its first church and moved it to the corner of South Eighth and West Scott Streets. In 1866, the congregation built a small brick-clad Gothic-influenced church designed by John Rugee. In 1873, the congregation added the frame parsonage which still survives, and, in 1879, the school building. In 1884, 13 families were released from the congregation to establish Christ Evangelical Lutheran Church. The congregation is affiliated with the Wisconsin Evangelical Lutheran Synod (WELS).

The current church building was designed by Milwaukee architect Andrew Elleson in Victorian Gothic style and built in 1885. It has a cruciform floor-plan, with a massive square tower on each side of the front entrance - one 100 feet (30 m) tall and the other 165 feet (50 m) tall. The pedimented gables on the larger tower have a German flavor, similar to St. Mary's in Lubeck. The spires on the towers and the peak of the gable are topped with crosses. The interior is well-preserved, with the altar standing in a tall apse, and in front of an antique white wood reredos. To the altar's left is an elevated goblet-shaped pulpit. A U-shaped balcony rings the sides and back of the nave, a common feature of 18th century churches in Germany. A large pipe organ (Wangerin-Weickhardt, Opus 146, 1914 / Verlinden Organ Co., Opus 641, 1948/49) commands the back.

Other remaining structures in the complex are:

- The 1873 parsonage is south of the church - a wood frame building in simplified Italianate style. It is now used for church offices.
- The 1879 school building stands across the street from the church - a 2-story Italianate-styled brick building designed by architect John Rugee.
- The 1898 social hall designed by O. C. Uehling stands south of the school.

In 1860, the congregation and building rose out of a working-class neighborhood of modest homes of immigrants. The south side is not so different in 1987.

Gallery

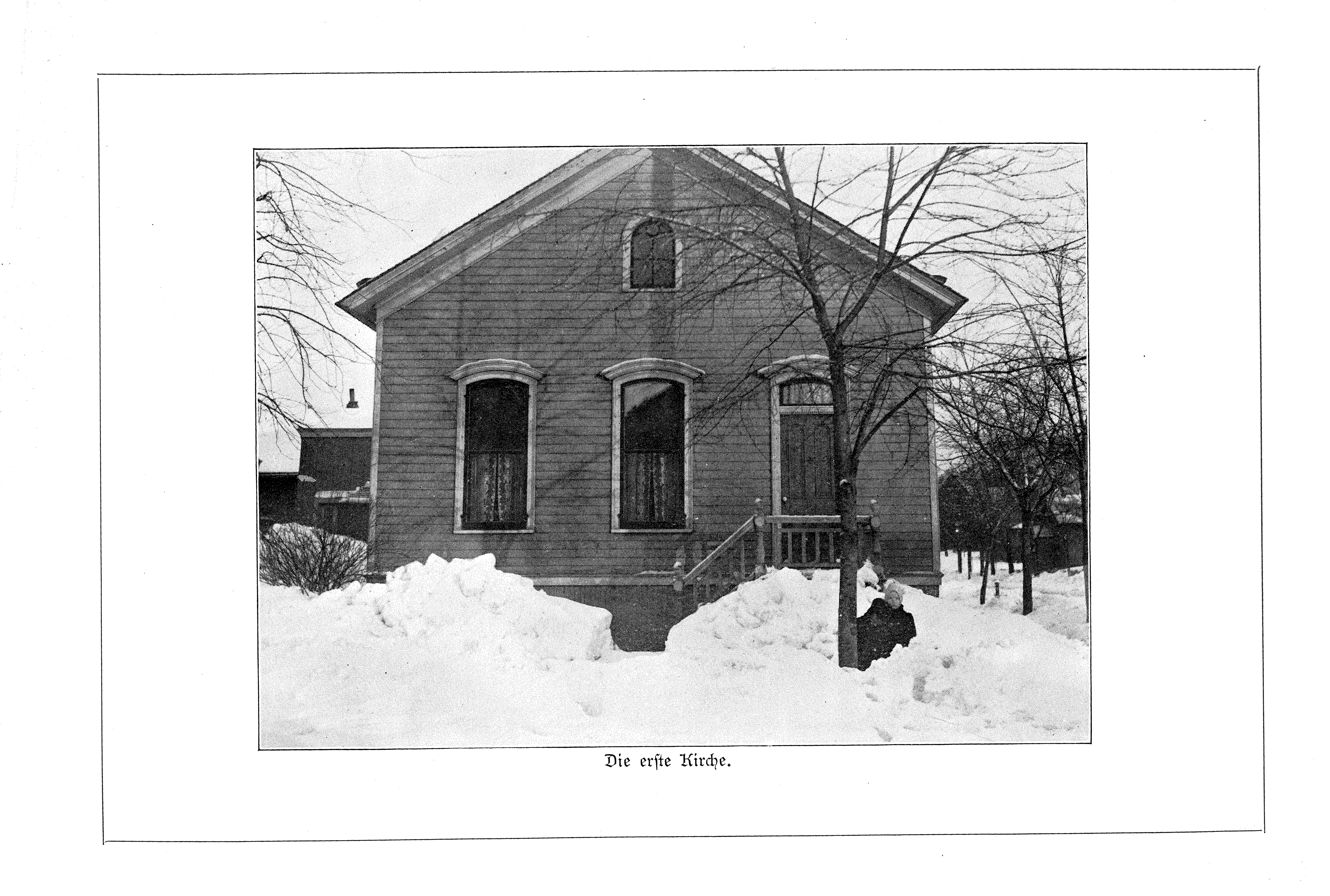
First church, circa 1860

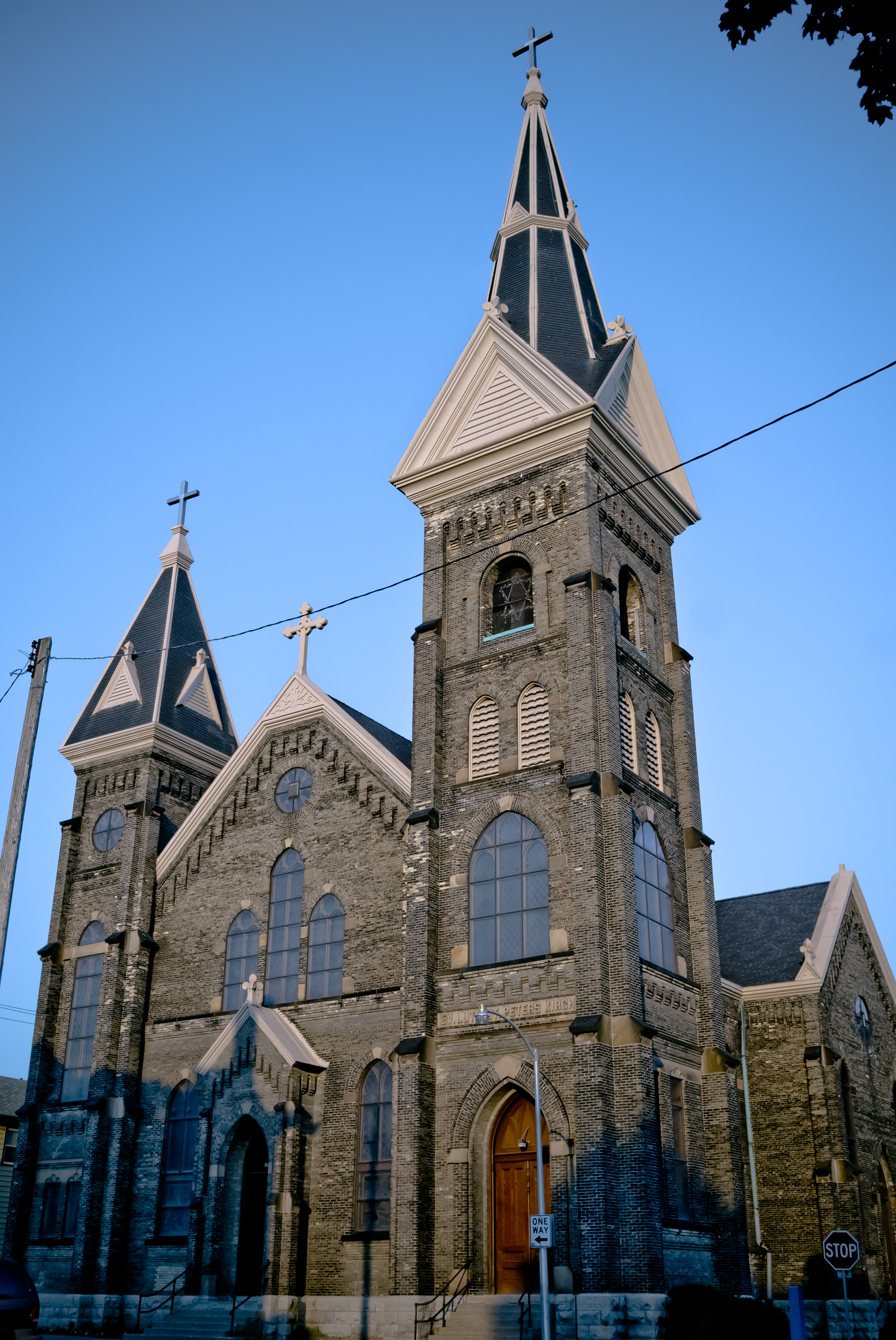
Exterior View

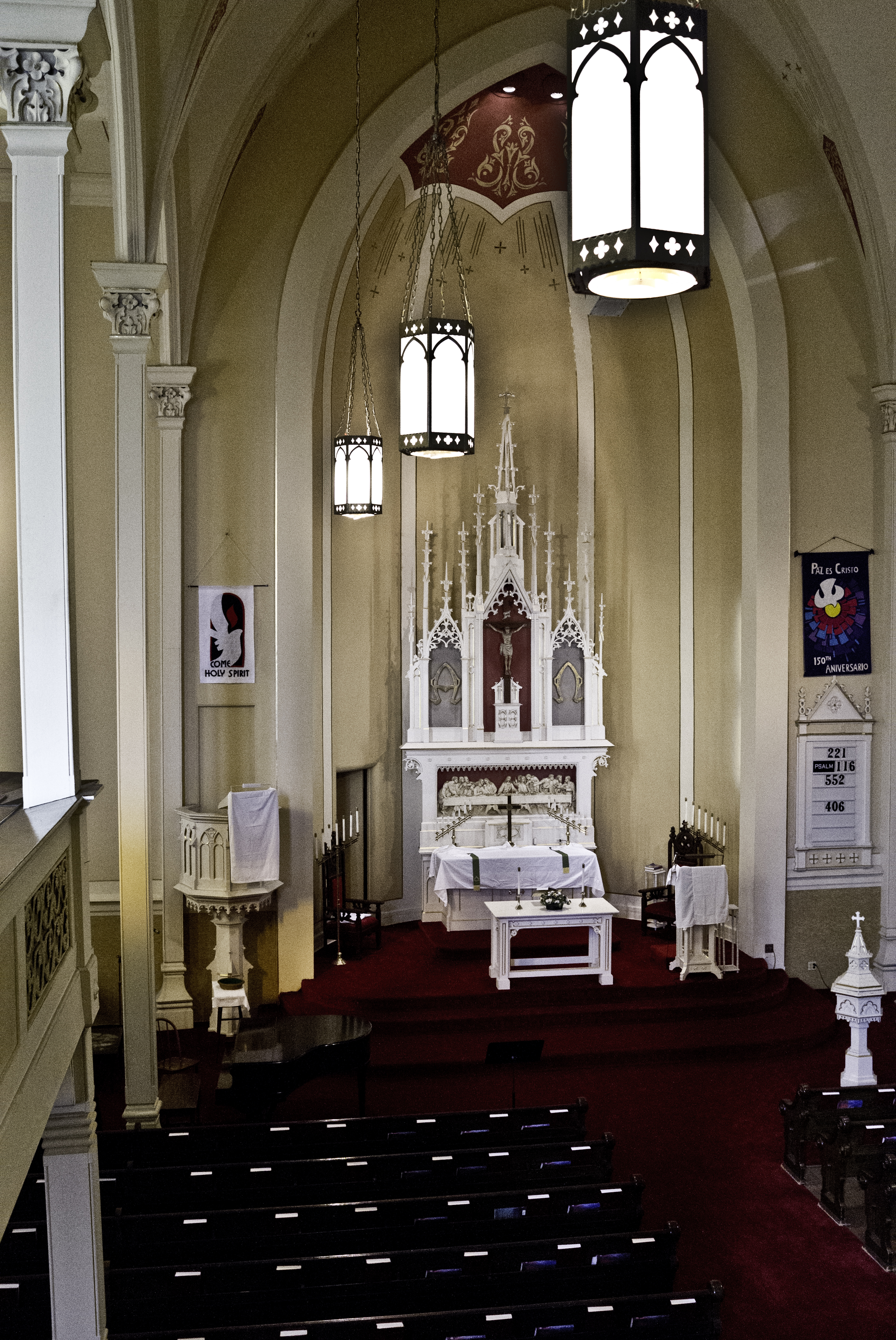
Interior View - West

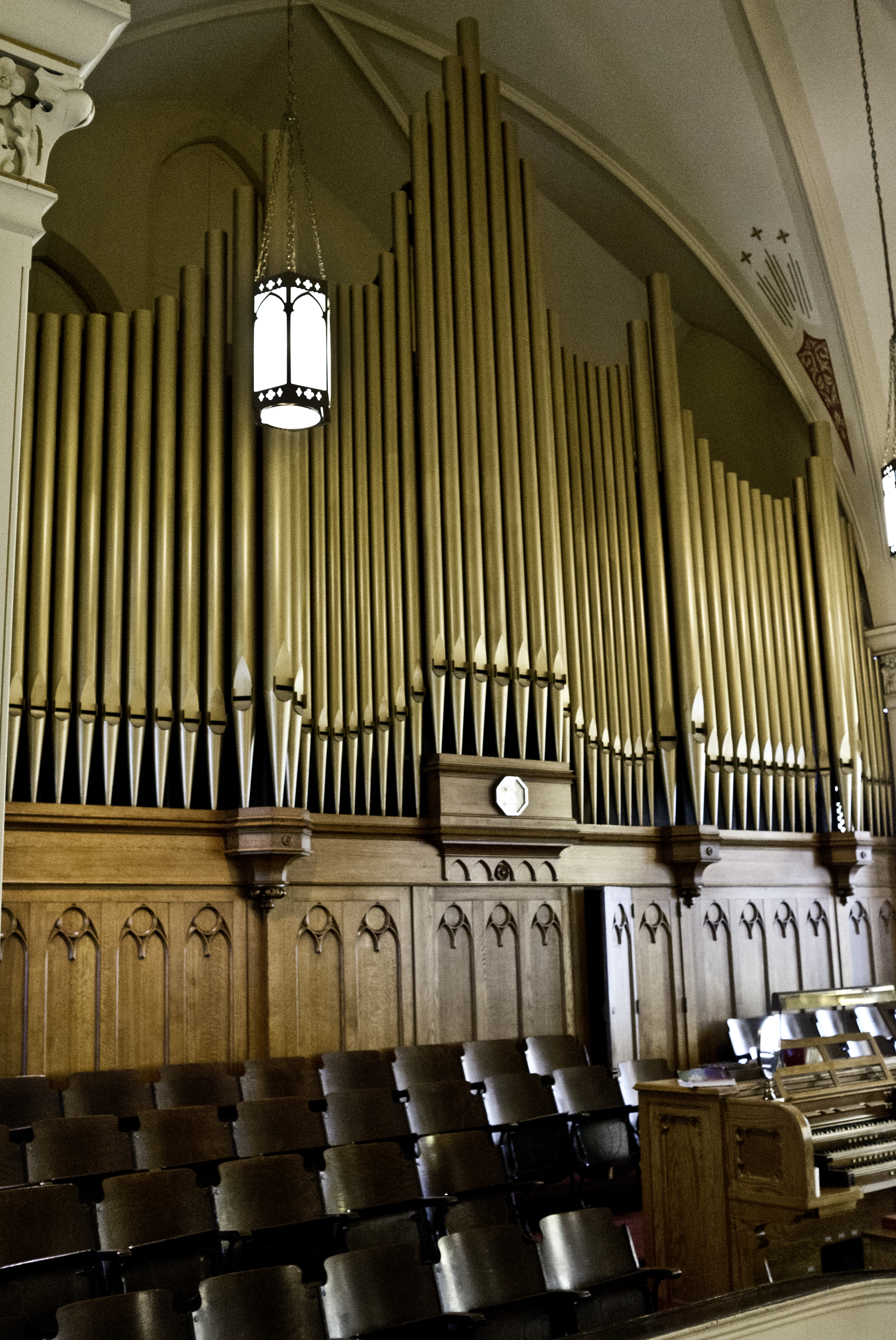
Interior View - East
