= First Unitarian Church (Milwaukee, Wisconsin) =

Historic church in Wisconsin, United States

- U.S. National Register of Historic Places
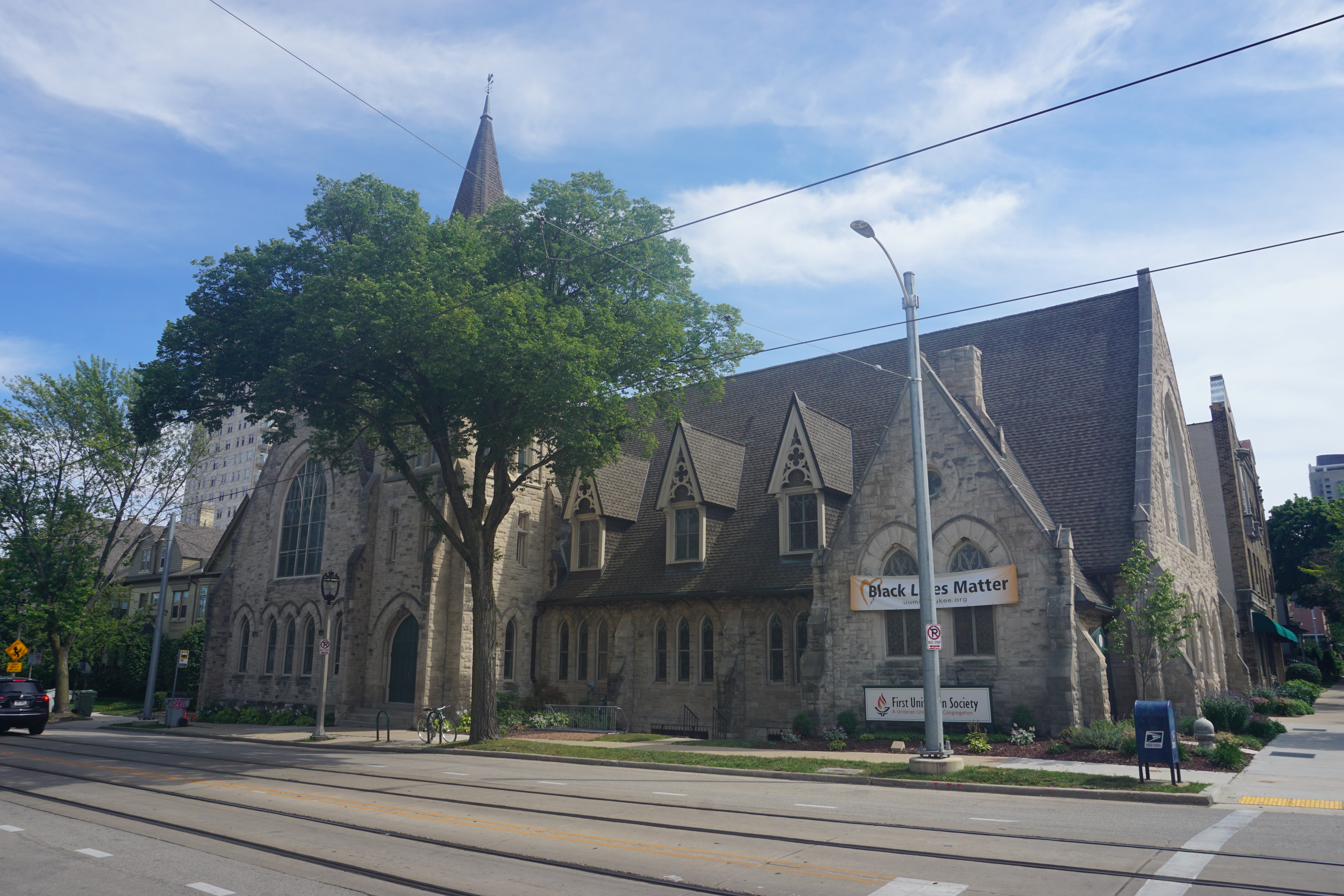
- First Unitarian Church
- Location: 1009 E. Ogden Ave. Milwaukee, Wisconsin
- Coordinates: 43.04791°N 87.89938°W
- Built: 1891
- Architect: Ferry & Clas
- Architectural style: Gothic Revival
- NRHP reference No.: 74000102
- Added to NRHP: December 30, 1974

The First Unitarian Church is a historic Gothic Revival-styled church built in 1891–92 in Milwaukee, Wisconsin. It was added to the National Register of Historic Places in 1974.

First Unitarian's congregation hired the firm of Ferry & Clas of Milwaukee to design their new church building, and Ferry himself led the design - in reserved Gothic Revival style. Most walls are rock-faced Bedford limestone, rising to steep gable roofs with dormers. The general floor-plan is L-shaped, with a tower rising from one leg of the L.

Inside, the auditorium has a hammerbeam ceiling resting on carved stone corbels. The chancel contains an organ, a pulpit, and a carved oak sedilia. The windows have abstract designs.

The church is little changed from when it was built. First Unitarian was placed on the NRHP for its architectural significance, but it is also the oldest Unitarian church building in Milwaukee.
