= Ferry & Clas =

American architectural firm

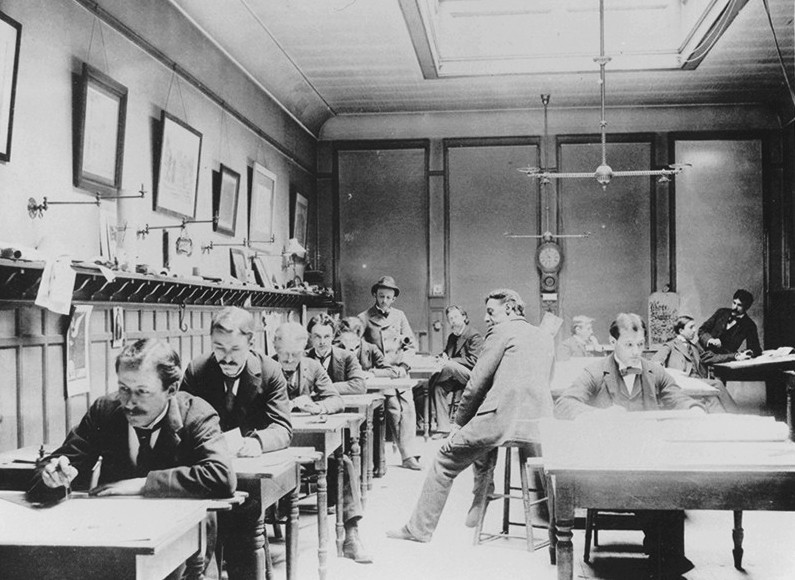
Ferry & Clas architects at work

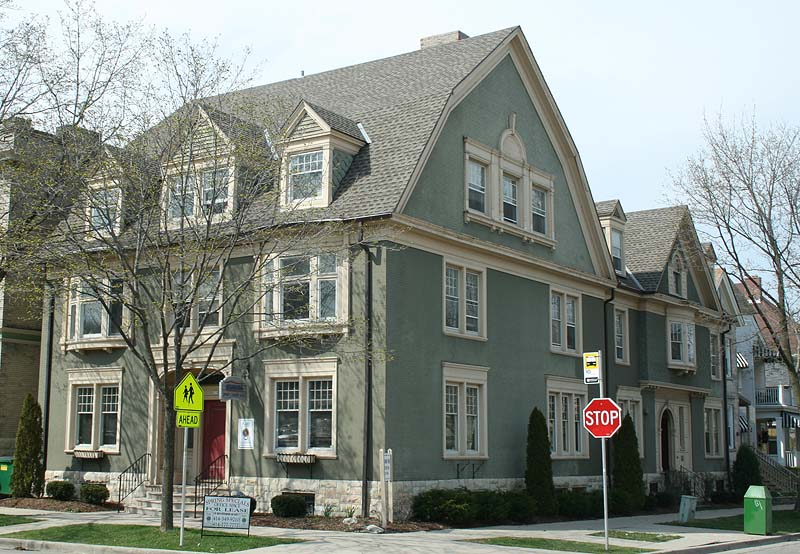
Knapp-Astor House

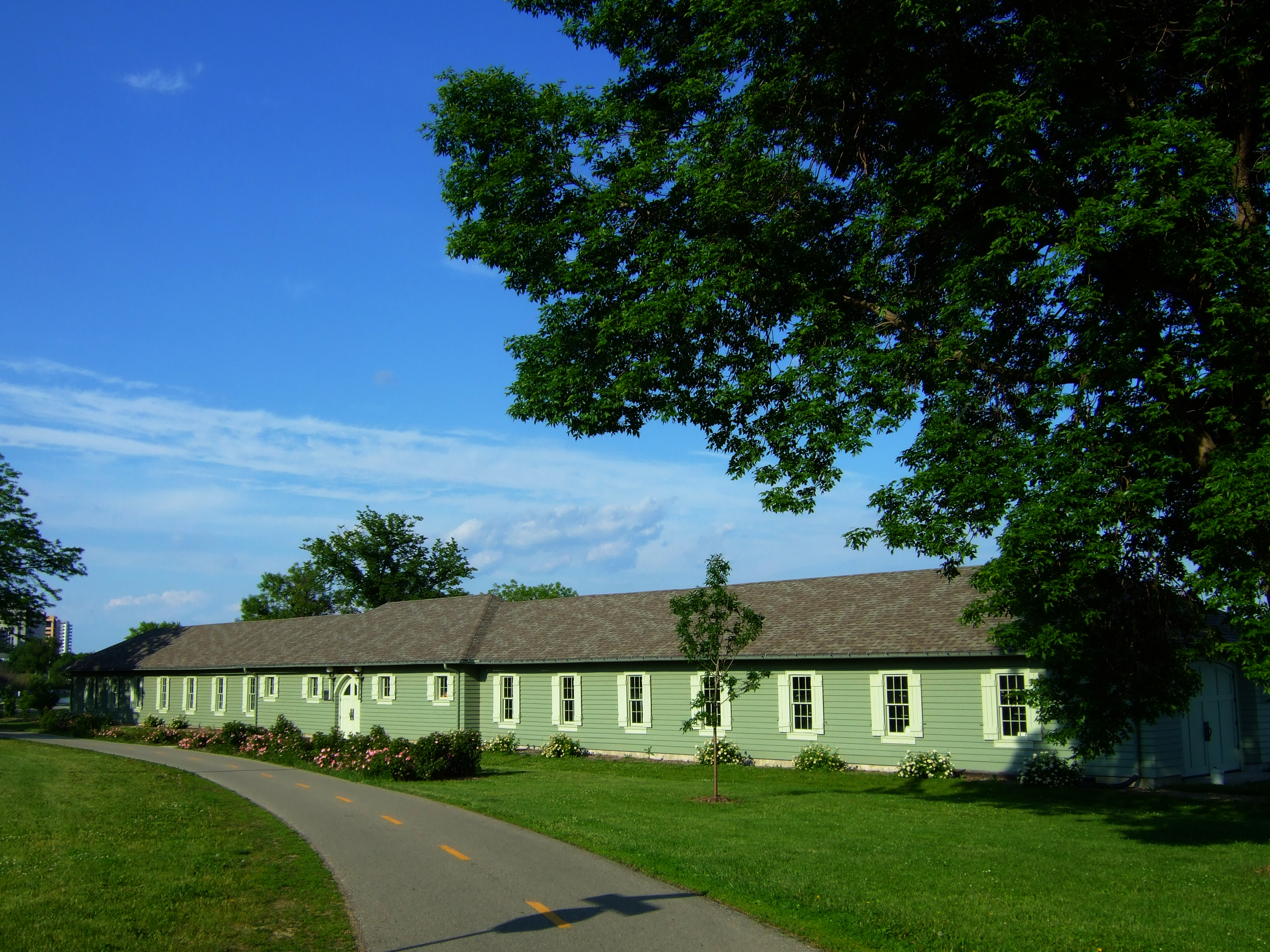
Brittingham Park Boathouse

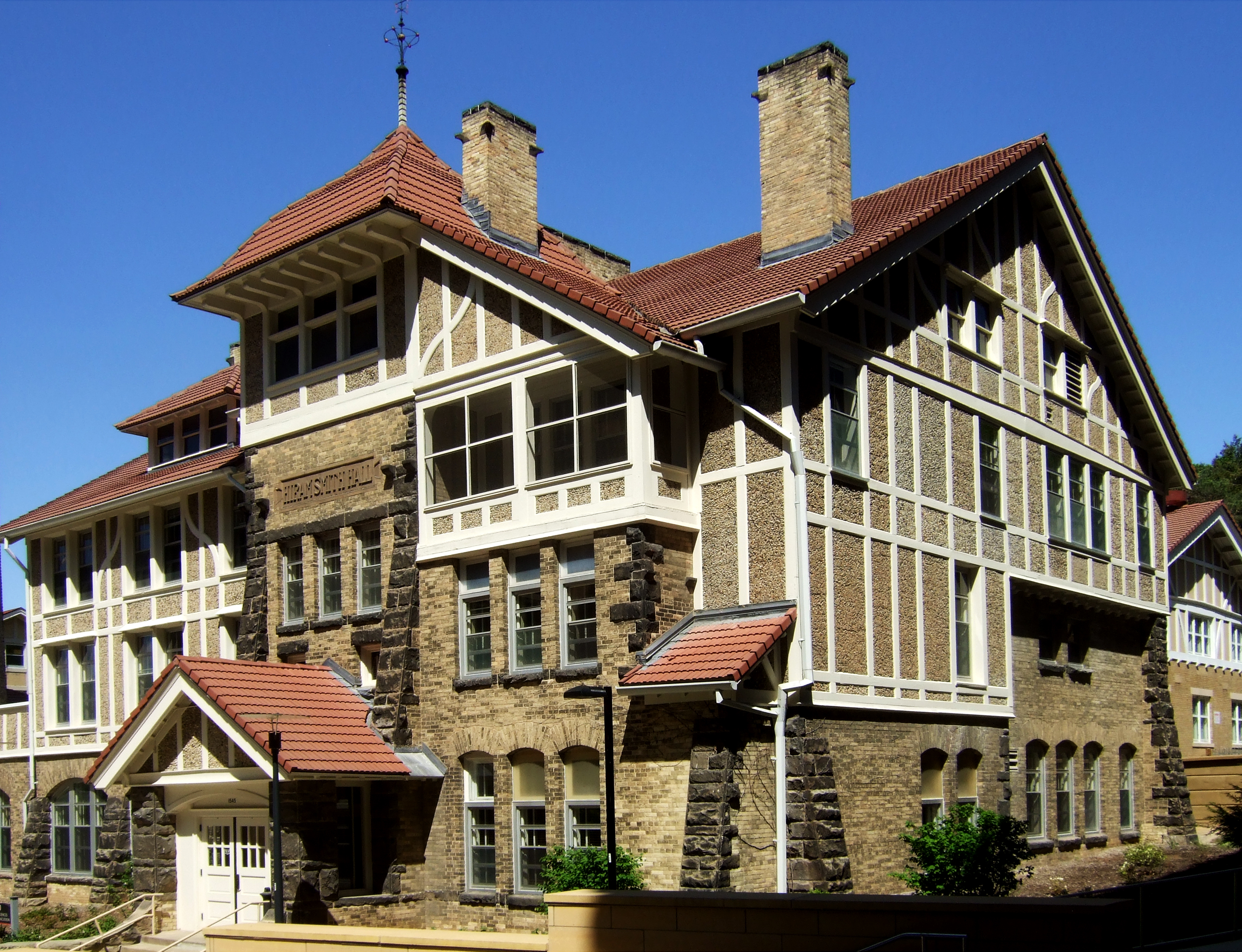
Hiram Smith Hall and Annex

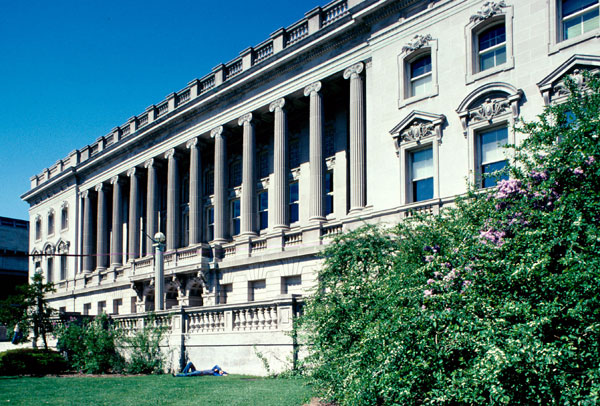
Wisconsin Historical Society

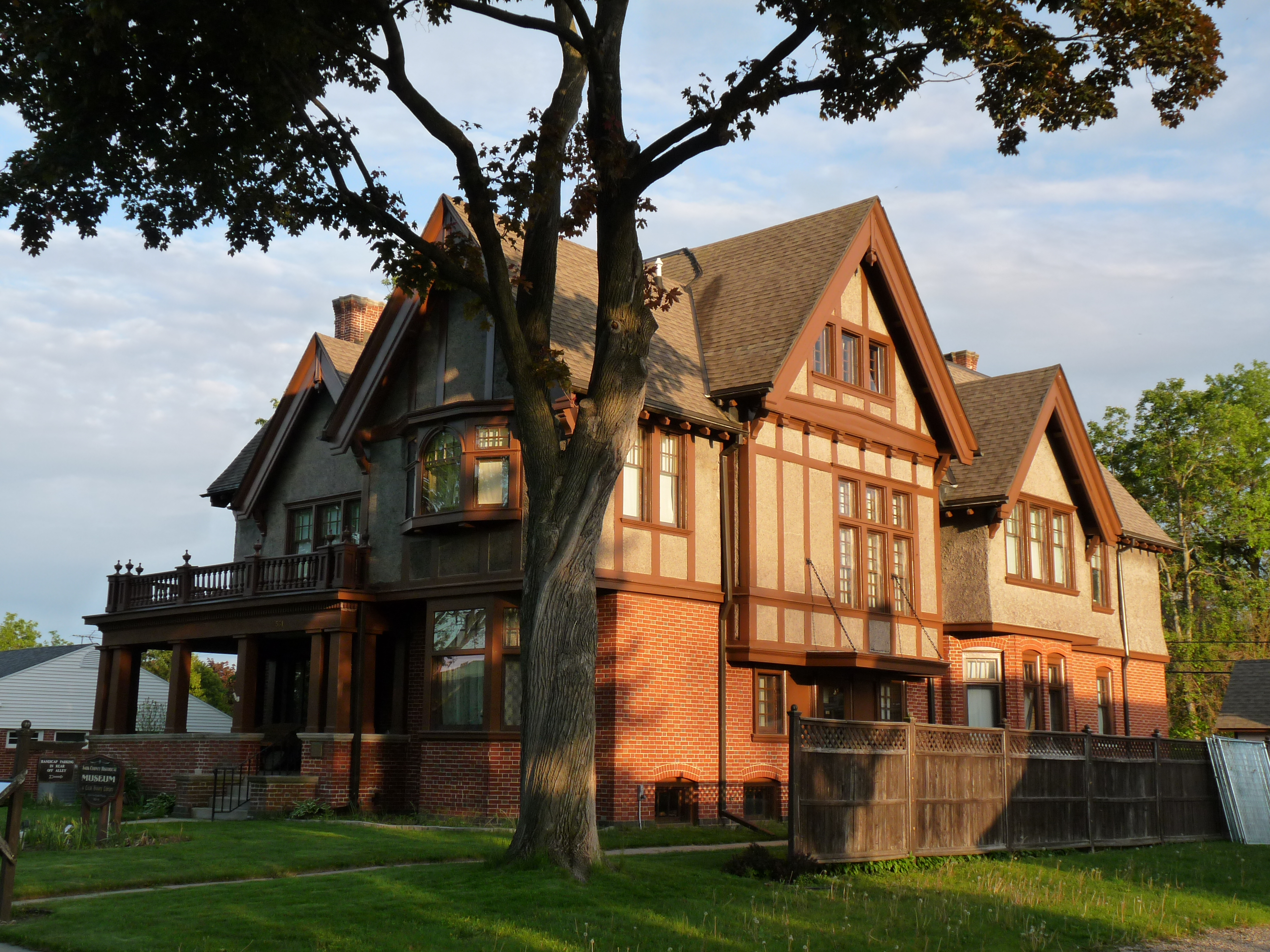
Jacob Van Orden House

Ferry & Clas was an architectural firm in Wisconsin established in 1890 by George Bowman Ferry (1851–1918) and Alfred Clas (1859–1942). The firm designed many buildings that are listed on the National Register of Historic Places.

A Book of the Office Work of Geo. B. Ferry and Alfred C. Clas, Architects, Milwaukee, Wisconsin, was published in 1895. The partnership was dissolved in 1912.

== Notable works ==
- First Unitarian Church (1891) at 1009 E. Ogden Avenue in Milwaukee (Ferry & Clas) NRHP-listed
- Knapp-Astor House (1891) at 930 E. Knapp Street and 1301 N. Astor Street in Milwaukee (Ferry & Clas) NRHP-listed
- Joseph Vilas Jr. House (1891–93) at 610–616 N. 8th Street in Manitowoc, Wisconsin (Ferry & Clas) NRHP-listed
- Pabst Mansion (1892) at 2000 W. Wisconsin Avenue in Milwaukee (Ferry & Class) NRHP-listed
- Tower of the Cathedral of St. John the Evangelist (1893) at 812 N. Jackson Street, Milwaukee (Ferry & Clas) NRHP-listed
- Franklyn C. Shattuck House (1893) at 547 E. Wisconsin Avenue at Neenah, Wisconsin (Ferry & Clas) NRHP-listed
- Central Library (1895) at 814 W. Wisconsin Avenue in Milwaukee (Ferry & Clas) NRHP-listed
- Saint James Court Apartments (1895, 1903) at 831 West Wisconsin Avenue in Milwaukee (Ferry & Clas) NRHP-listed
- State Historical Society of Wisconsin (1896–1900) at 816 State Street in Madison, Wisconsin (Ferry & Clas) NRHP-listed
- Mrs. Willis Danforth house (1897) at 819 N. Cass Street in Milwaukee, a 2.5-story house with half-timbering in the gable end (a Tudor Revival decoration). Contributing building in 1986-NRHP-listed Cass-Wells Street Historic District.
- Wisconsin State Reformatory (1898) at the southeast corner of Riverside Drive and Route 172 in Allouez, Wisconsin (Ferry & Clas) NRHP-listed
- L. D. Fargo Public Library (1899–1902) at 120 E. Madison Street in Lake Mills, Wisconsin (Ferry & Clas) NRHP-listed
- Midsummer Carnival Shaft (1900) at W. Wisconsin Avenue between N. 8th and N. 11th Streets in Milwaukee
- Nye House (1901–12 remodel into Georgian Revival style) at 1643 N. Nye Avenue in Fremont, Nebraska (Ferry & Class) NRHP-listed. Now houses the Louis E. May Museum and Dodge County Historical Society.
- Lake Park Pavilion (1903) in Milwaukee
- Jacob Van Orden House (1903) at 531 4th Avenue in Baraboo, Wisconsin (Ferry & Clas) NRHP-listed. Currently houses the museum of the Sauk County Historical Society.
- State Bank of Wisconsin (1903) at 210 E. Michigan Street in Milwaukee (Ferry & Clas) NRHP-listed
- Jackson District Library (1903, 1906) at 244 W. Michigan Street in Jackson, Michigan (Ferry & Clas) NRHP-listed
- Peter and Mattie Reiss House (1906) at 1227 N. 7th Street in Sheboygan, Wisconsin
- Sauk County Courthouse (1906) at 515 Oak Street in Baraboo, Wisconsin (Ferry & Clas) NRHP-listed
- Hiram Smith Hall and Annex (1909) at 1545 Observatory Drive at the University of Wisconsin-Madison (Ferry & Clas) NRHP-listed
- Charles Danforth house (1904) at 823 N. Cass Street in Milwaukee, a 2.5-story house in Dutch Colonial Revival style with dark brick walls. In the Cass-Wells Street Historic District.
- Lake Park Grand Staircase (1908) in Milwaukee
- Brittingham Park Boathouse (1909–1910) on N. Shore Drive in Madison, Wisconsin (Ferry & Clas, with John Nolen) NRHP-listed
- Tripp Memorial Library and Hall (1912–13) at 565 Water Street in Prairie du Sac, Wisconsin (Ferry & Clas) NRHP-listed
