= Hotel Washington (Madison, Wisconsin) =

Former building in Madison, Wisconsin

Coordinates: 43°04′06.8″N 89°23′37.8″W

The Hotel Washington was a building in Madison, Wisconsin, built at the end of the 19th century. It housed several businesses during the 1970 through 1990s. It was an important cultural center in south central Wisconsin and served as a destination and important venue for members of the LGBT community from Wisconsin and northern Illinois, until its destruction by fire on February 18, 1996. The Club de Wash in the complex hosted many well-known musical acts over its history, and served as a hub of central Wisconsin's live music community. The Hotel Washington organization, through owner Rodney Scheel, was important in establishing gay pride events in the Madison area, including Madison's seminal MAGIC Picnic.

== History ==
Located at 636 West Washington Avenue in Madison, the Hotel was created at the Milwaukee Road railroad depot in Madison in 1885. Originally named the Commercial Hotel, it was a low-rent hotel and halfway house through most of the twentieth century, until it was purchased by Rodney Scheel in 1975 for $190,000. At the time, it also contained a "greasy spoon" restaurant called the HOT L Cafe. Rodney and his brother and business partner Greg converted the cafe into the Café Palms, a higher-end eating establishment.

After Rodney Scheel's death in 1990, his brother, Greg Scheel, continued to operate the Hotel Washington with no break in continuity.

At the building's peak in the 1990s, several other businesses were located within the confines of the building:

- Rod's, a historically significant gay bar
- Club de Wash, a mixed use bar with regular live entertainment
- Café Palms, a restaurant featuring omelettes, sandwiches, and desserts.
- The Barber's Closet, a basement bar that was a former speakeasy during Prohibition, and which featured a range of craft cocktails
- The Barber's Closet Salon, a working hair salon whose shelf of barber's tools hid a second door to The Barber's Closet (bar)
- The New Bar, a teen-friendly dance club
- Café Espresso
- The Micro Bar, a bar featuring craft beers

The building also maintained a working hotel with both short and long-term housing. Residents included several retired railroad workers.

== Fire ==
Just after 6 am on Sunday, February 18, 1996, fire broke out in the building. Fire crews arrived at the scene at 6:28 AM. All 16 people in the building at the time of the fire were evacuated safely. The building was largely gutted. Losses were estimated at US$2 million.
