= Jackson Carnegie Library =

- Jackson District Library
- U.S. National Register of Historic Places
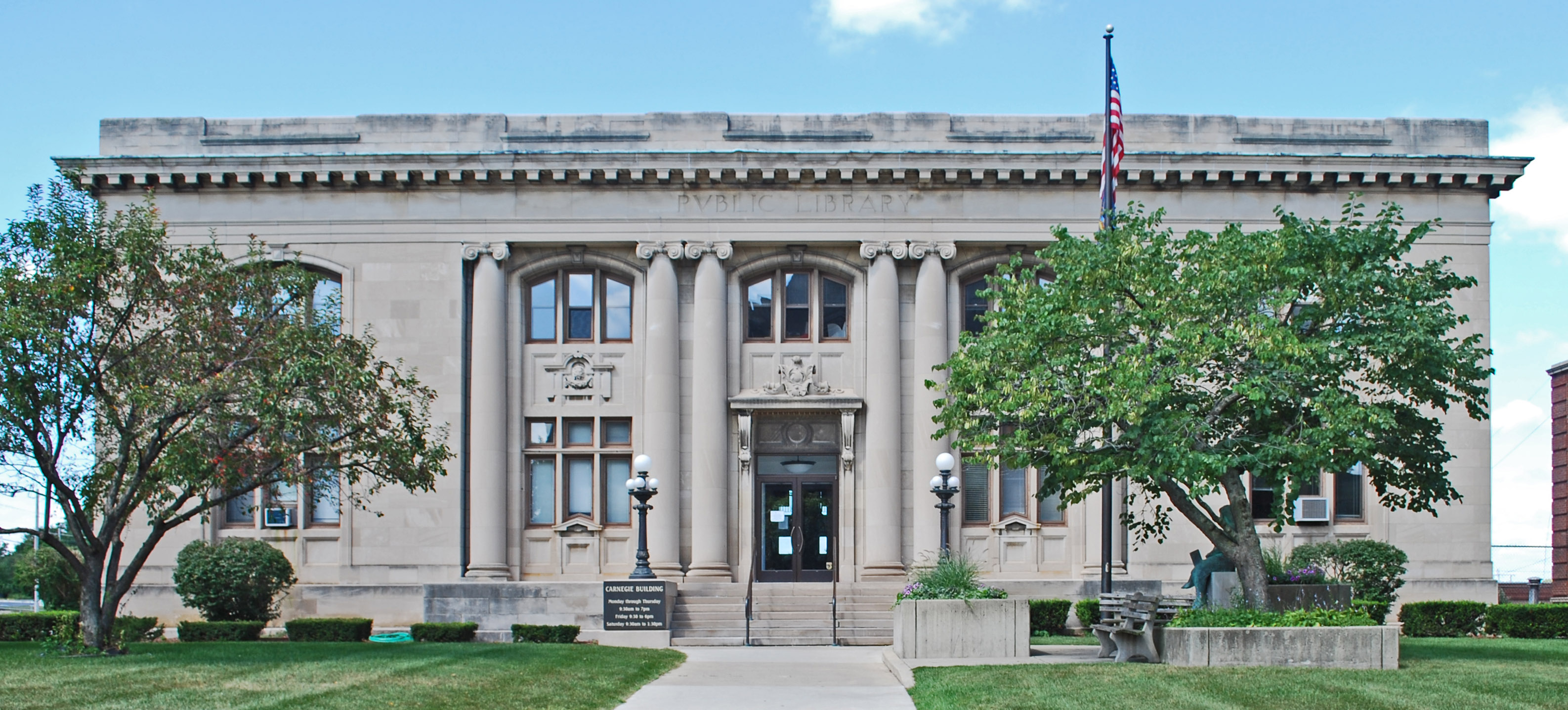

- Location within Michigan Location within the United States
- Interactive map
- Location: 244 W. Michigan St., Jackson, Michigan
- Coordinates: 42°14′53″N 84°24′40″W
- Area: 0.8 acres (0.32 ha)
- Built: 1903
- Architect: Ferry & Clas
- Architectural style: Neoclassical
- NRHP reference No.: 80001873
- Added to NRHP: March 10, 1980

The Jackson Carnegie Library is the main branch of the Jackson District Library, located at 244 West Michigan Street in Jackson, Michigan. It was listed on the National Register of Historic Places in 1980.

== History ==
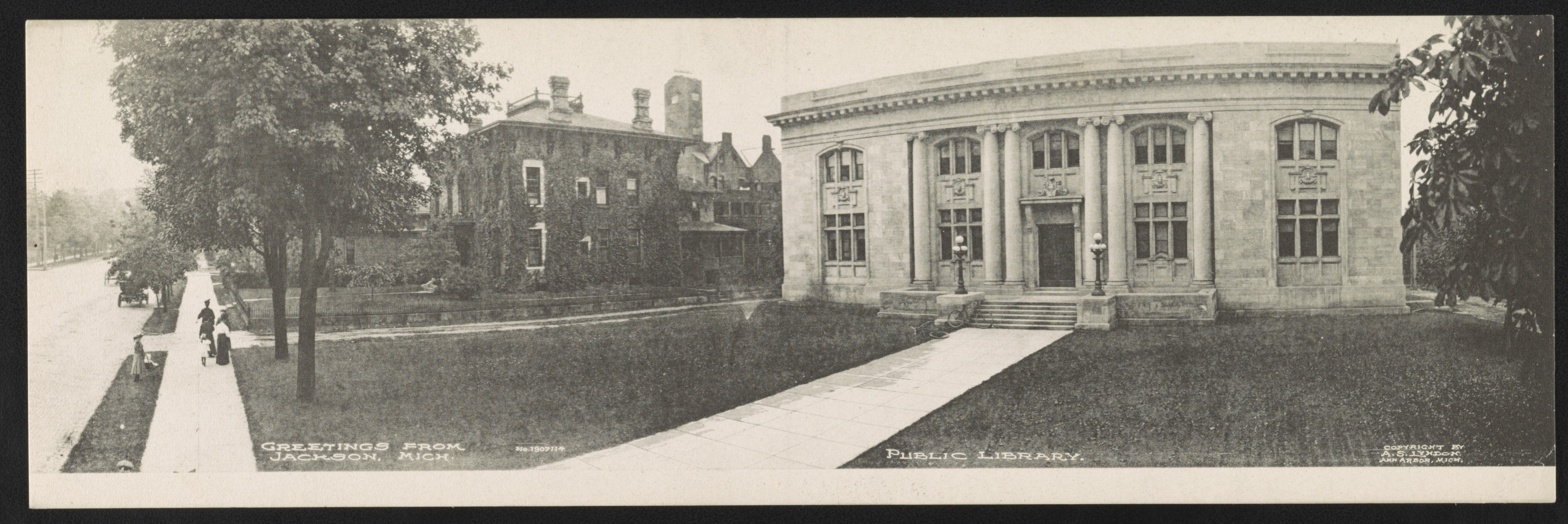
The library (right) in 1908, shortly after its construction

The first library in Jackson was founded in 1863 by a group of Jackson citizens. In 1884, the organization was taken over by the City of Jackson. In 1901, Andrew Carnegie donated $70,000 to the city, for the purpose of constructing a new library building. The city retained the Milwaukee architectural firm of Ferry and Clas to design the new structure. Construction began in 1903, and was completed in 1906.

The Jackson Public Library merged with the Jackson County Library in 1978, forming the Jackson District Library. The Carnegie Library remains the main branch of the JDL system. In 1981, a circular structure was built at the rear of the library to provide additional space.

As of 2022, the Carnegie Library is the busiest branch in the 13-branch Jackson District Library system.

== Description ==
The Jackson Carnegie Library is a rectangular, two-story, Neoclassical structure constructed of Indiana limestone. It measures 99 feet long by 66 feet wide. It has a gently sloping flat roof. The front facade is symmetrical, and is approached by a broad central staircase with massive end walls topped with iron lamp stands. The entrance to the building is slightly recessed, and is flanked with six engaged Ionic columns which extend upward to a modillioned cornice. The cornice continues around the sides of the building. The windows are set into two-story arched recesses topped by a keystone. On the front, the spandrels between the first and second-story windows contain stone lion heads and floral swags.
