= Jacob Van Orden House =

- U.S. National Register of Historic Places
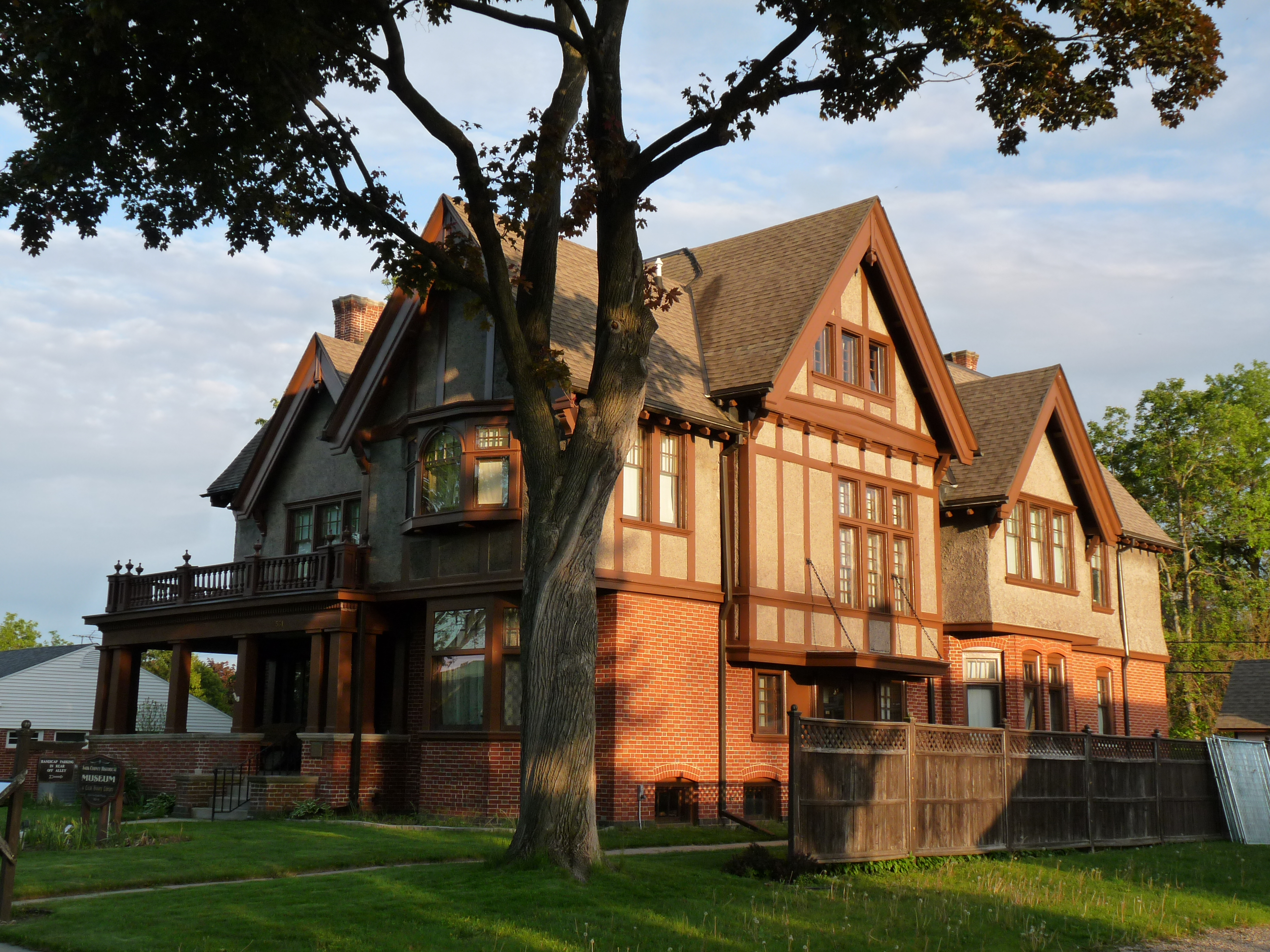

- Location within Wisconsin
- Location: 531 4th Ave., Baraboo, Wisconsin
- Coordinates: 43°28′15″N 89°45′06″W
- Area: less than one acre
- Built: 1903
- Built by: Isenberg Brothers
- Architect: Ferry & Clas
- Architectural style: Tudor Revival
- NRHP reference No.: 96000988
- Added to NRHP: September 6, 1996

The Jacob van Orden House is a historic house at 531 4th Avenue in Baraboo, Wisconsin. Jacob Van Orden, the president of the Bank of Baraboo, had the house constructed for his family in 1903. Milwaukee architectural firm Ferry & Clas designed the Tudor Revival house, which was built by George and Carl Isenberg of Baraboo. The three-story house has a red brick first floor and a stucco exterior with half-timbering on the upper floors. Its design also includes a front porch with a second-story balcony, bay windows on the front facade, and a roof with eight gables, all with bargeboard trim and wide eaves. The Van Orden family lived in the house until 1938; the Sauk County Historical Museum moved into the house the following year.

The house was added to the National Register of Historic Places on September 6, 1996.
