= Madison Pride and MAGIC Picnic =

Madison Pride and MAGIC Picnic was the yearly celebration of the lesbian, gay, bisexual, and transgender (LGBT) residents of Madison, Wisconsin. The 2009 version of this event, was "Wisconsin Capitol Pride". In 2014, OutReach LGBT Community Center took over the major Pride celebration in Madison. It remains the main Pride Parade planning organization today.

== Origins ==
The event is an amalgamation of two LGBT events that had originally been separate, distinct events:

The Pride march and Rally were originally organized by the now defunct GALVAnize organization, an LGBT group; The MAGIC Picnic was started by the late Rodney Scheel, who owned and operated the Hotel Washington complex of nightclubs (which included the establishments The Club DeWash, The New Bar, Rods, The Barbers Closet, etc.), which the community lost in a fire in 1996. The picnic is traditionally held on the third weekend of July, although that has been shifted in some years to avoid conflicts with other regional gay events, such as the Gay Games in 2006 when the picnic was held on the second weekend of July. The picnic is traditionally held at Brittingham Park at the junction of Park Street and West Washington Avenue in Madison.

The acronym MAGIC stands for Madison Area Gay Interim Committee, which was also formed partially in response to Anita Bryant's anti-gay campaign of the late 1970s and early 1980s. The MAGIC picnic was also closely associated with the local and national gay volleyball league, which usually held a tournament in Madison on the same weekend as the MAGIC picnic.

On October 11, 1987, Madison residents Pam Jacobson and Tim O'Brien were separately attending the Second National March on Washington for Lesbian and Gay Rights, inspired by the presence of the more than 500,000 people assembled on the national Mall. Upon returning to Madison, Jacobson explored the possibility of organizing a local march, and began searching for others to help organize the event. At the same time, O'Brien was also discussing the idea of organizing a march. Mutual friends connected O'Brien and Jacobsen, and their meeting resulted in the formation of the Madison Pride March Committee.

It was during the first committee meeting that the name GALVAnize (Gay and Lesbian Visibility Alliance) was selected. During GALVAnize's existence as a group, its goal was to increase awareness about the number of lesbians, gays, and bisexuals in Madison, to work for their civil rights, and to form coalitions with other minority groups in Madison.

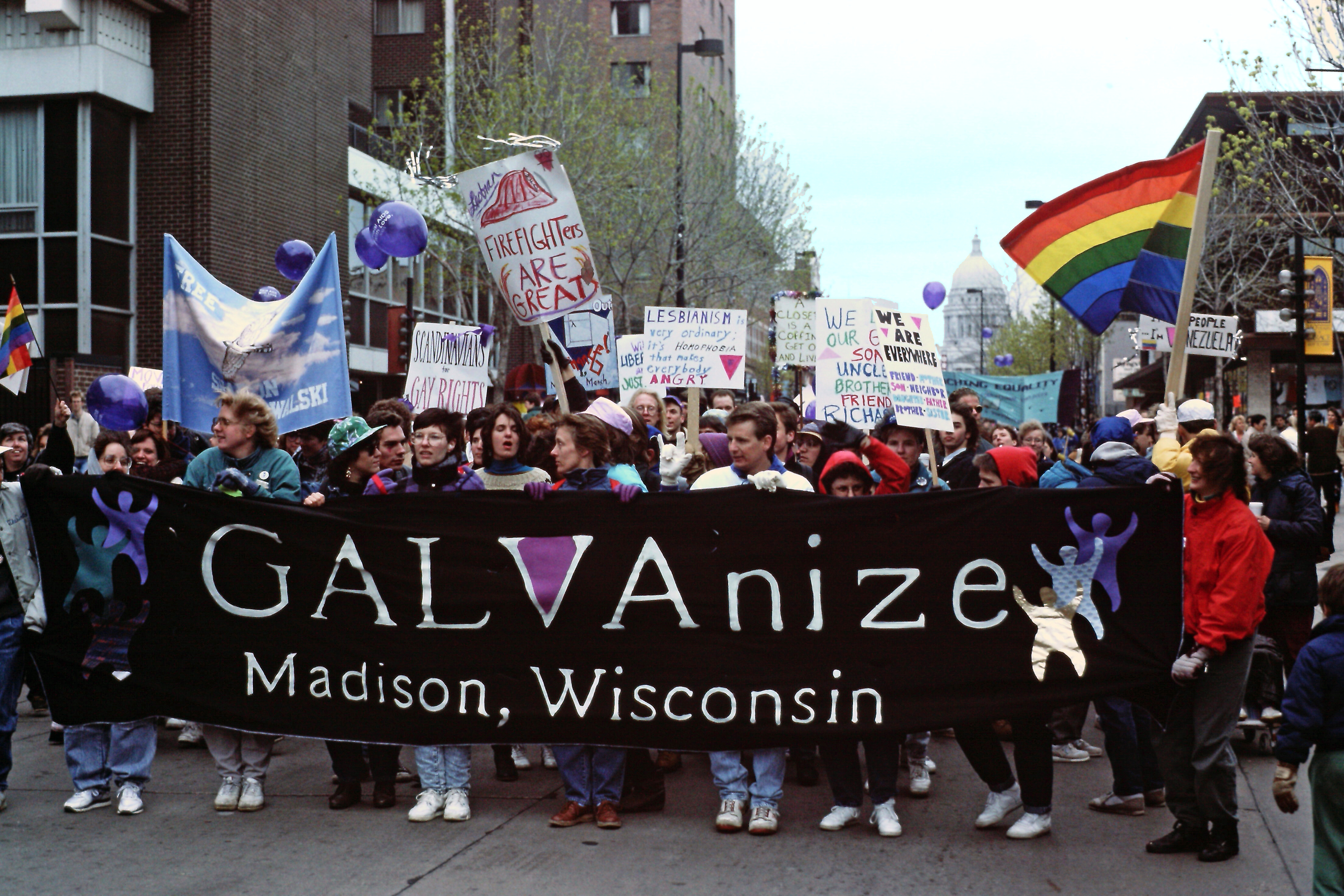
The GALVAnize march on May 6, 1989

GALVAnize held two major marches for gay and lesbian civil rights in Madison. The first was held on May 6, 1989. The second major march occurred two and a half years later on October 5, 1991. Official attendance estimates for the first march averaged about 7,500 people, and about 5,000 people at the second march, on a scale roughly comparable to the number of people attending many of the record-setting Madison civil rights and anti-war related marches of the 1960s. Both of these marches were accompanied by several days of associated events, including concerts and workshops, and an exhibition of a major portion of the NAMES Project AIDS Memorial Quilt. Both events were coordinated by a central committee of approximately twenty members that met once or twice weekly over a period of many months, and at least a dozen standing and ad hoc committees. Everything was made possible due to the individual contributions of hundreds of volunteers, many volunteering labor equivalent to part-time or even full-time jobs.

The events served as a catalyst for dozens of positive stories about LGBTQ people in the local media, and an opportunity to highlight the very visible presence of dozens of LGBTQ-supportive religious communities. The marches also featured the visible support of local government officials, and a wide variety of community nonprofits and for-profit businesses, and formed the foundation for coalition-building efforts in years to come with other groups working for civil rights and social justice. In addition, the accompanying workshops were an incubator for new organizations addressing the needs of a changing community, including a workshop that laid the groundwork for the 200 plus families-strong Lesbian Parents Network and other subsequent parenting groups (such as Rainbow Families), as well as galvanizing LGBTQ community efforts around support of LGBTQ youth and associated advocacy efforts in the schools, and efforts to reach out to older LGBTQ adults, and other diverse LGBTQ communities. In a city and county that had already seen more than a decade of multiple pioneering successful openly lesbian and gay candidates for local office, the marches also had a marked positive political effect, including boosting efforts at the level of Madison Council and Dane County Board to pass legislation providing some measure of domestic partner benefits. In general, the successful organizing efforts that surrounded these initial marches also provided a positive example of what Madison's LGBTQ community members could accomplish working together—laying the groundwork for the political mobilization and coalition-building work that would eventually lead to the election, from Madison, of the nation's first openly lesbian Congresswoman.

The first march's rally featured a variety of distinguished speakers, including Madison Alderperson Ricardo González (the nation's first openly gay Latino-American elected official), State Rep. David Clarenbach (principal author of Wisconsin's 1982 first-in-the-nation LGBTQ rights law), and then Dane County Supervisor Tammy Baldwin. Baldwin would later make state history in 1992 as Wisconsin's first openly lesbian/gay member of the state legislature, and then national history in 1998 as the first successful non-incumbent openly gay or lesbian candidate for the U.S. Congress. The second march's rally included a keynote speech by Urvashi Vaid, then director of the National Gay and Lesbian Task Force.

While each of these major marches in 1989 and 1991 was judged to be extremely successful by most measures, the human and financial resources necessary to continue to produce an ongoing series of events on this scale proved to be prohibitive (which also explains, in part, why the second major march occurred over two years after the first). LGBTQ community leaders believed that an annual event, planned on a more manageable scale, and in collaboration with groups producing longstanding existing LGBTQ-focused summer events, such as the MAGIC Picnic, would be more sustainable and desirable. While many Pride celebrations nationwide occur during the last weekend in June, in order to coincide with the annual observance of the anniversary of the historic Stonewall Rebellion, Madison organizers decided not to compete with popular celebrations occurring nearby in Chicago and in Minneapolis/St. Paul on that same weekend, and decided to hold Madison's pride celebration several weeks later.

Following that, the March evolved into a more traditional pride parade and was consolidated into the Pride Weekend in 2002. Pride Weekend traditionally consists of the Madison LGBT community center OutReach's annual dinner on Friday (in which community leaders and allies receive recognition for their work), University of Wisconsin–Madison GLBT Alumni breakfast on Saturday or Sunday morning (which also includes a ceremony recognizing distinguished LGBT alumni), the MAGIC picnic on Saturday afternoon, followed by the Pride Parade on Sunday morning and a repeat of the picnic on Sunday afternoon. 2008 was the last Madison Pride and Magic Picnic related event.

== Successor organizations ==
Madison's 2009 celebration was called "Wisconsin Capitol Pride," and occurred on Saturday, August 15, and Sunday, August 16, 2009. In the 20th anniversary year of PRIDE, their pride committee honored the contributions of the founders of Madison's first major march in 1989 (described above), by asking them to serve as parade marshals. 2009's PRIDE took place on the Alliant Energy Center's Willow Island. 2013 saw the end of this organization.

In 2010, nightclub Plan B (and successor club Prism) created a festival for the community that runs in July during national Pride month that has a focus on music. Fruit Fest continues to this day.

In late 2013, OutReach LGBT Community Center gathered with other LGBT Social Groups and Businesses in Madison, WI to help the PRIDE celebration once more become a strong event for the community. On August 10, 2014, the very first OutReach Pride Parade made its way down Willimason St, up to the Capitol Square and culminating in a rally and music. The event once more took shape on August 9, 2015, this time returning the PRIDE parade route to State St in Madison. The Pride parade returned on August 21, 2016, when OutReach once again hosted the Annual Pride Parade in Madison! 2017 and 2018 were the last two years of the OutReach Pride Parade. Each year bigger than the last.

In 2019, due to ongoing conflicts in the city for various reasons, the Pride Parade was discontinued for 2019. The Magic Picnic was resurrected as a festival and the first ever OutReach Magic Festival: A Pride Celebration was held on August 18, 2019, to a crowd of over 3,000 at Warner Park. OutReach plans to continue this model in the future. The parade is not a concept that is completely finished, but its future is in the air for the moment. OutReach remains the main successor to the Magic Picnic and Madison Pride orgs.
