= Saint James Court Apartments =

- U.S. National Register of Historic Places
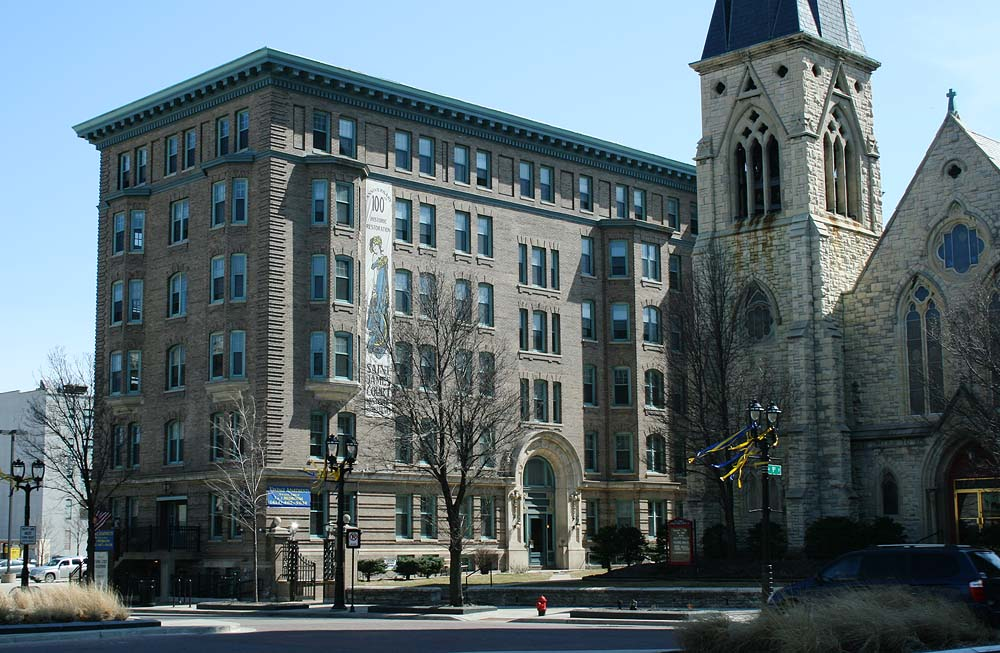
- Saint James Court Apartments
- Location: 831 W. Wisconsin Ave. Milwaukee, Wisconsin
- Coordinates: 43.03842°N 87.92269°W
- Built: 1903
- Architect: Ferry & Clas
- NRHP reference No.: 08000606
- Added to NRHP: July 2, 2008

The Saint James Court Apartments is a luxury apartment building designed by Ferry & Clas and built in 1903 in Milwaukee, Wisconsin. In 2008, the site was added to the National Register of Historic Places.

== History ==
Alfred C. Clas originally designed the building in 1895, but it was not built until 1903 after he purchased the land it sits on. It is adjacent to St. James Episcopal Church and across the street from the Central Library, the latter of which was also designed by Ferry & Clas and both of which are also listed on the National Register of Historic Places.

The apartment block was built by Alfred's brother Louis Clas. It is six stories, with a design influenced by Beaux Arts style. The west and north faces are ornamented with corner quoins and a cornice with classical moldings and modillion blocks above a line of dentils. Several columns of windows protrude as multi-story bays. The main entrance on the west side is a single door with sidelights beneath a wood frieze decorated with carved fronds, all framed by a round stone arch. The south and east faces of the building are much less decorated; Clas probably expected large buildings to be constructed on those sides.

Inside, there were originally four apartments per floor, for a total of 26 units. Floors were served by an elevator, which was not common at that time. The larger apartments had formal dining rooms with built-in china cabinets and a servant's bell in the floor. Off the pantry was a maid's room. Bathrooms had clawfoot tubs and many of the apartments had gas fireplaces and leaded glass windows. The basement had a doctor's office, central heating system, and the janitor's suite, for the guy who maintained the building and took care of apartments when the tenants were out.

Clas added features like the maid's room and fireplaces to appeal to the upper middle-class, which is different from most apartments built in Milwaukee at the time, which were walk-ups and Chicago tenement-style. Clas himself lived in one of these apartments from 1909 to 1920.
