= Cass-Wells Street Historic District =

Historic district in Wisconsin, United States

- Cass--Wells Street Historic District
- U.S. National Register of Historic Places
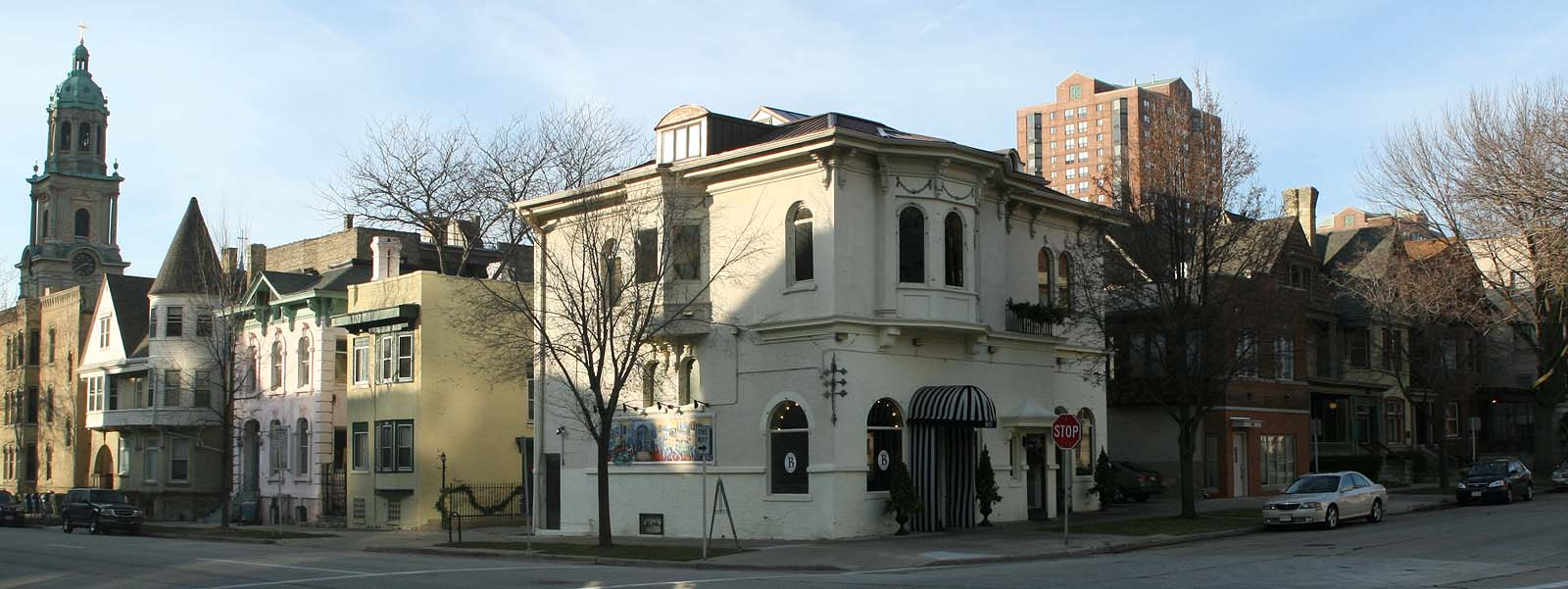
- A portion of the district.
- Location: 712, 718, and 724 E. Wells St. and 801, 809, 815, 819, and 823 N. Cass St., Milwaukee, Wisconsin
- Coordinates: 43.04191°N 87.90216°W
- Area: less than one acre
- NRHP reference No.: 86001325
- Added to NRHP: June 13, 1986

The Cass-Wells Historic District is a small group of historic homes in the Yankee Hill neighborhood of Milwaukee, Wisconsin, built from 1870 to 1914 in various styles. It was listed on the National Register of Historic Places in 1986 and on the State Register of Historic Places in 1989.

Contributing structures are, in the order built:

- The Bridget Hutchinson house (pictured center) at 801 N. Cass St. is a 2-story Italianate-styled house built about 1870. In 1931 the street-level was remodeled into store space.
- The Henry Manschot house at 718 E. Wells St. is a 2-story Italianate-styled house with a hip roof and brick walls with corner quoins, designed by Charles A. Gombert. Manschot was a butcher with a shop on Market Square. Governor Francis McGovern lived in this house in the 1920s.
- The Benjamin Parker house at 712 E. Wells St. is a 2.5-story cream brick house built in 1892. The style is the then-popular Queen Anne, typified by the asymmetry, the corner tower, and the different surface textures - particularly the shingles in the gable end.
- The Patrick Donnelly house at 815 N. Cass St. is a 2.5-story house designed by Charles Fitzgerald and built in 1896. The massing is Queen Anne, but the porches, railings and cornices are Colonial Revival, one of the styles that was popular after Queen Anne. Patrick was a principal in a school.
- The Mrs. Willis Danforth house at 819 N. Cass St. is a 2.5-story house designed by Ferry & Clas and built in 1897. The half-timbering in the gable end is a Tudor Revival decoration.
- The Charles Danforth house at 823 N. Cass St. is a 2.5-story house designed by Ferry & Clas and built in 1904. The style is Dutch Colonial Revival, signaled by the gambrel roof. The walls are a distinctive dark brick. Charles was a salesman.
- The duplex at 724 E. Wells St. is a 2-story flat-topped building designed by F.W. Andree and built in 1914.
