= Tripp Memorial Library and Hall =

- U.S. National Register of Historic Places
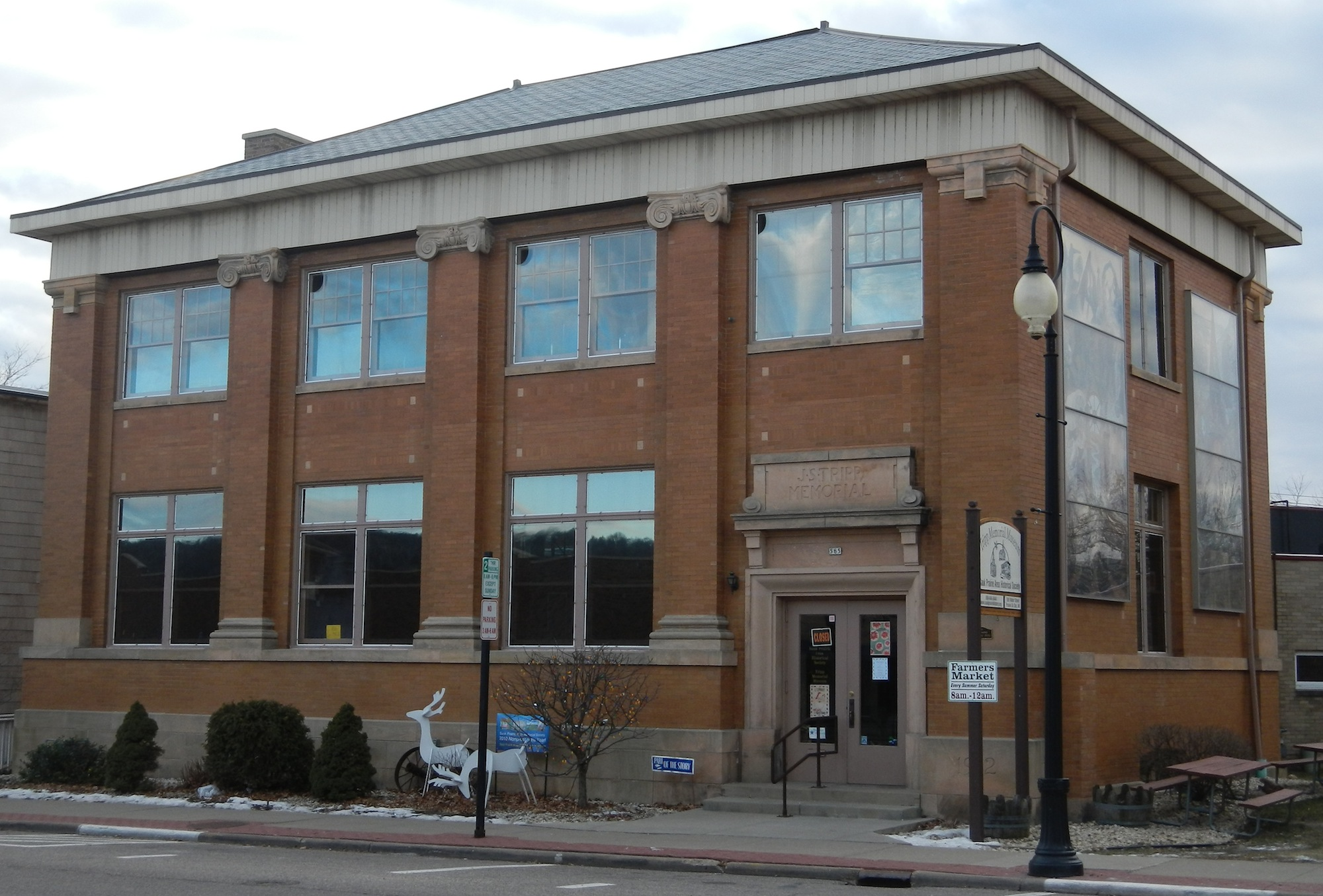

- Location within Wisconsin
- Location: 565 Water St., Prairie du Sac, Wisconsin
- Coordinates: 43°17′29″N 89°43′17″W
- Area: less than one acre
- Built: 1912-13
- Architect: Joseph Dresen; Ferry & Clas
- Architectural style: Neoclassical
- NRHP reference No.: 81000060
- Added to NRHP: September 14, 1981

The Tripp Memorial Library and Hall is a historic building at 565 Water Street in Prairie du Sac, Wisconsin. The building was constructed in 1912–13 to serve as Prairie du Sac's public library and village hall; the library had previously occupied two rooms of a local hotel. J. Stephens Tripp, a member of the Wisconsin State Assembly and a public official in Prairie du Sac and neighboring Sauk City, donated the majority of the library's construction costs. Architect Joseph Dresen designed the Neoclassical building; the Milwaukee-based firm Ferry & Clas served as consulting architects. The two-story brick building's design includes brick pilasters with sandstone caps, a stone entrance surround topped by a plaque, and an iron cornice. The building was used as a library and the home of village government for several decades; it is now a local history museum.

The building was added to the National Register of Historic Places on September 14, 1981.
