= St. James Episcopal Church (Milwaukee, Wisconsin) =

Historic church in Wisconsin, United States

- U.S. National Register of Historic Places
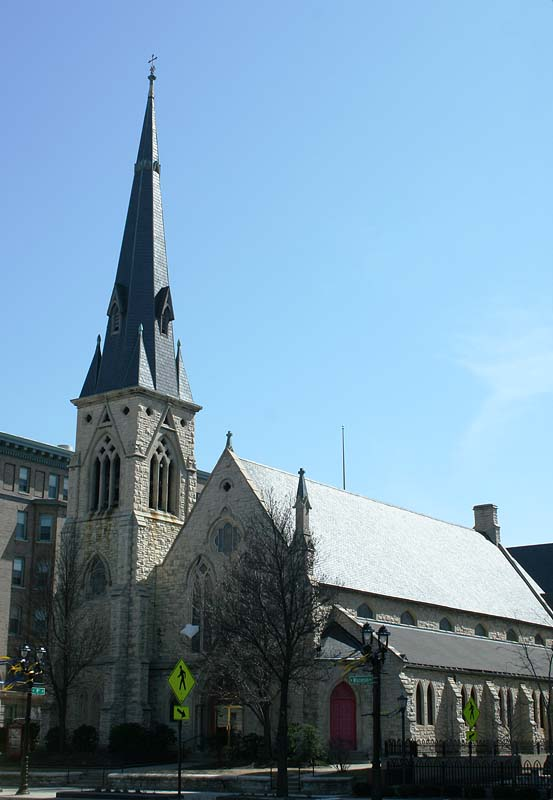

- Location within Wisconsin Location within the United States
- Location: 833 W. Wisconsin Ave., Milwaukee, Wisconsin
- Coordinates: 43°2′18″N 87°55′23″W
- Area: 0.8 acres (0.32 ha)
- Built: 1867
- Architect: Gordon W. Lloyd
- Architectural style: Gothic Revival
- NRHP reference No.: 79000098
- Added to NRHP: June 27, 1979

St. James' Episcopal Church is a Gothic Revival-styled Episcopal church built in 1867 - once a parish of the Episcopal Diocese of Milwaukee. In 1979 the building was added to the National Register of Historic Places. Today it is probably the oldest stone church remaining in Milwaukee.

St. James parish was founded in 1850 as a mission of St. Paul's Episcopal Church. In 1851 the congregation bought the land where today's church stands, which had been the site of Kilbourntown's Spring Street Burying Ground - the first cemetery on the west side of what would become Milwaukee. Many of the early settlers were Yankees, and many prominent people were members, with the first Episcopal service held in Increase Lapham's store, and Alexander Mitchell serving on the parish's building committee.

In 1867 the congregation built the stone church of today. It was designed by Gordon William Lloyd of Detroit in an English Gothic Revival style. The main block was built first, in 1867–68, with walls of Wauwautosa limestone, tall lancet openings, and clerestory windows above the side aisles. The square corner tower was added in 1870 to 1871, with corner buttresses and a wheel window that match those on the main block, and a tall broach spire topped with a cross.

A fire on December 31, 1872, destroyed the buildings interior, leaving only the walls and bell tower. The church reopened on April 19, 1874. In 1899 a parish house was added, designed by John Moller.

The church is adjacent to the Saint James Court Apartments and across from the Central Library. Both sites are also listed on the National Register of Historic Places.

Over the years, the congregation dwindled until the church held its final service on November 1, 2017 and was sold. In 2020 it reopened as a venue for weddings and other events.
