= L. D. Fargo Public Library =

Historic place in Wisconsin, United States

- U.S. National Register of Historic Places
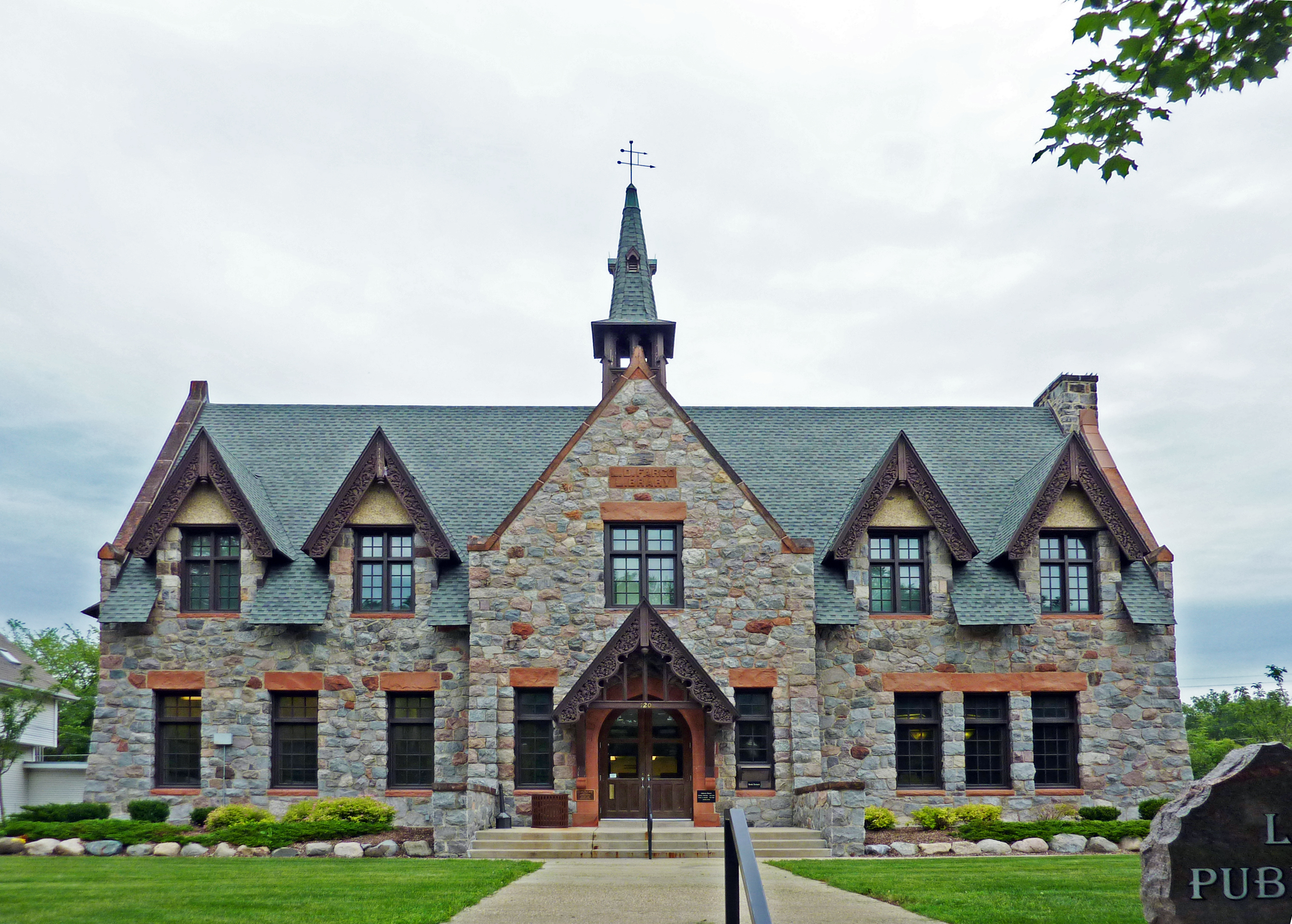
- L. D. Fargo Public Library
- Location: 120 E. Madison St., Lake Mills, Wisconsin
- Coordinates: 43°04′51″N 88°54′38″W
- Area: less than one acre
- Built: 1899-1902
- Architect: Ferry & Clas/L.A. Giles
- Architectural style: Late Gothic Revival/Storybook
- NRHP reference No.: 82000675
- Added to NRHP: January 18, 1982

The L. D. Fargo Public Library is a historic public library at 120 E. Madison Street in Lake Mills, Wisconsin.

== History ==
Businessman Lorenzo Dow Fargo donated funds for the library to Lake Mills in 1899; the building was completed in 1902. Prolific Milwaukee architects George Ferry and Alfred Clas, who also designed several other Wisconsin libraries, designed the library; Ferry went on to serve on the library's board. The library's design incorporates elements of Gothic Revival and Tudor Revival architecture. The two-story building has a rough fieldstone exterior, a projecting entrance block with a bargeboard roof above the entrance, four steep dormers with matching bargeboard on the front facade, and a steeple atop the gable roof. When it opened, the library became a local community center as well, and both the local women's club and the city's branch of the Women's Christian Temperance Union used it as their headquarters.

The library was listed on the National Register of Historic Places in 1982 and on the State Register of Historic Places in 1989. It is still in use as the city's public library.
