= Brittingham Boathouse =

- Brittingham Park Boathouse
- U.S. National Register of Historic Places
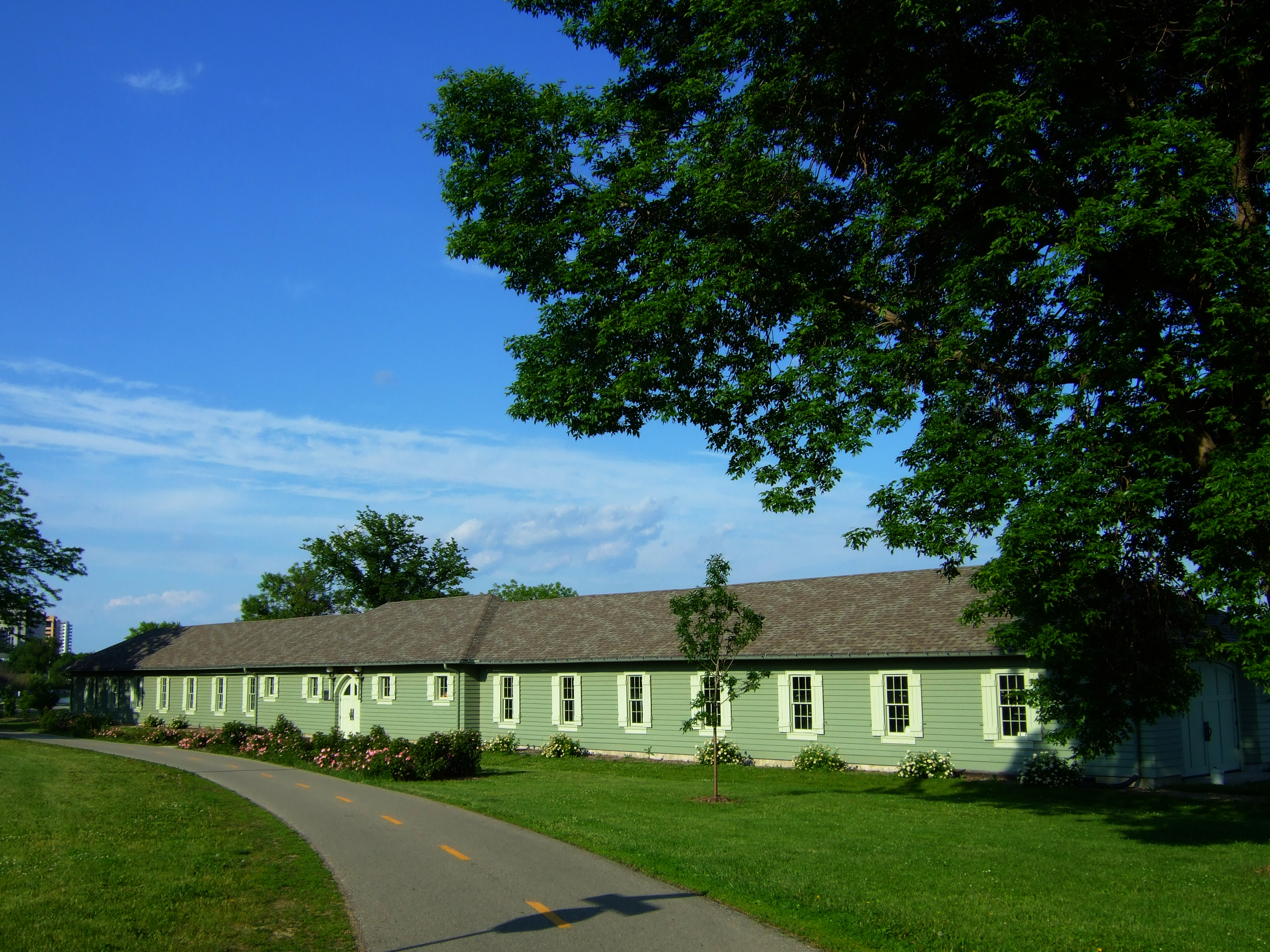

- Location within Wisconsin Location within the United States
- Location: N. Shore Dr., Madison, Wisconsin
- Coordinates: 43°3′55″N 89°23′18″W
- Area: less than one acre
- Built: 1910
- Architect: Ferry & Clas; John Nolen
- NRHP reference No.: 82000649
- Added to NRHP: June 30, 1982

The Brittingham Boathouse is a historic boathouse along a bay of Lake Monona in Madison, Wisconsin. Built in 1909–10, it is the city's oldest extant public park building. In 1982 the boathouse was placed on the National Register of Historic Places.

Despite its beautiful setting, the City of the Four Lakes had virtually no public parklands up to the 1890s. In 1894, a group of Madison's civic leaders formed the Madison Park and Pleasure Drive Association, aiming to open up and preserve scenic areas around Madison for the public to enjoy. This was a local manifestation of the progressive City Beautiful movement that emerged in many parts of the U.S. starting in the 1890s. More general goals were to improve the quality of life around Madison and promote the city's development. The Association played a large part in the creation of Tenney, Vilas and Brittingham Parks.

Brittingham Park traces its origins to 1903, when the city acquired a small parcel of land along Monona Bay. At the time, the area was marshy and described as “weedy, littered with kitchen garbage and dead fish, and a breeding ground for mosquitoes,” rather than a suitable public park.

At a 1904 meeting of the Pleasure Drive Association, it was noted that 90% of visitors to Madison passed the bay by railroad, and a proposal was made to transform the “disease breeding hole” into a park. In 1905, lumber baron and philanthropist Thomas E. Brittingham donated an initial $8,000 to acquire an additional 27 acres along the bay. Development work involved dredging sand from Lake Monona to fill the marshy areas, followed by soil covering and landscaping. Brittingham also financed the construction of a bathhouse, contributing to the park’s early success.

By the 1910 season, the bathhouse at Brittingham Park served approximately 50,000 swimmers. It rented out 300 bathing suits, and on hot afternoons long queues often formed, with patrons waiting to use suits that were still wet as others exited the water.

The boathouse was built that same year - 1910. T.E. Brittingham had donated $7500 for the bathhouse on condition that the city contribute $5000 for a boathouse. John M. Olin, the President of the Pleasure Drive Association, also wanted to build a public boathouse to replace some private boathouses that were sacrificed to make way for the park, and for the surrounding working-class neighborhood. Massachusetts landscape architect John Nolen, who was responsible for much of Madison's civic architecture, and Milwaukee architecture firm Ferry and Clas collaborated on the building's design. The boathouse was one story tall and thirteen bays wide, with walls of cypress on concrete footings, hip-roofed. The style is mainly utilitarian; its ornamental features include overhanging eaves with exposed rafters and a pointed arch entrance. The central block housed the office, a refreshment area, and men's and women's locker rooms. In 1921 another six bays were added on the south end.

The Madison Park and Pleasure Drive Association served as the city's de facto parks department until 1931. In 1938 in transferred its properties to the city.

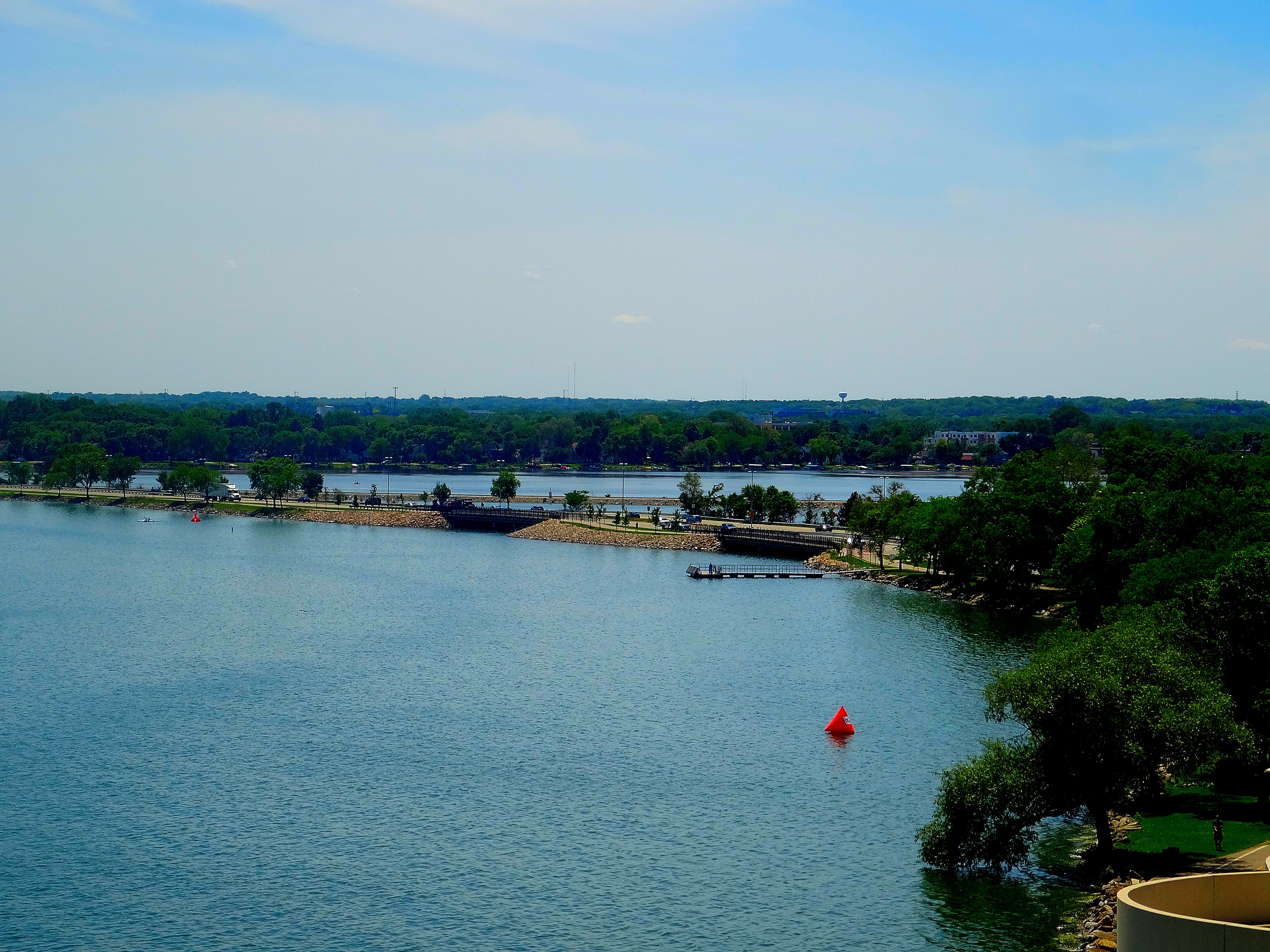
Monona Bay in 2014; boathouse hidden by trees at right

Over the years the buildings have needed maintenance. The bathhouse was razed in the 1960s. In 1979 the city re-roofed, sanded, and painted the boathouse. In 1982 it was added to the National Register of Historic Places. In 2006 it was significantly rehabilitated - moving the whole building a bit to where the ground was more stable. This was a joint effort by the City of Madison, the Madison Parks Foundation, and the Camp Randall Rowing Club.
