= Jackson District Library =

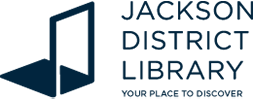

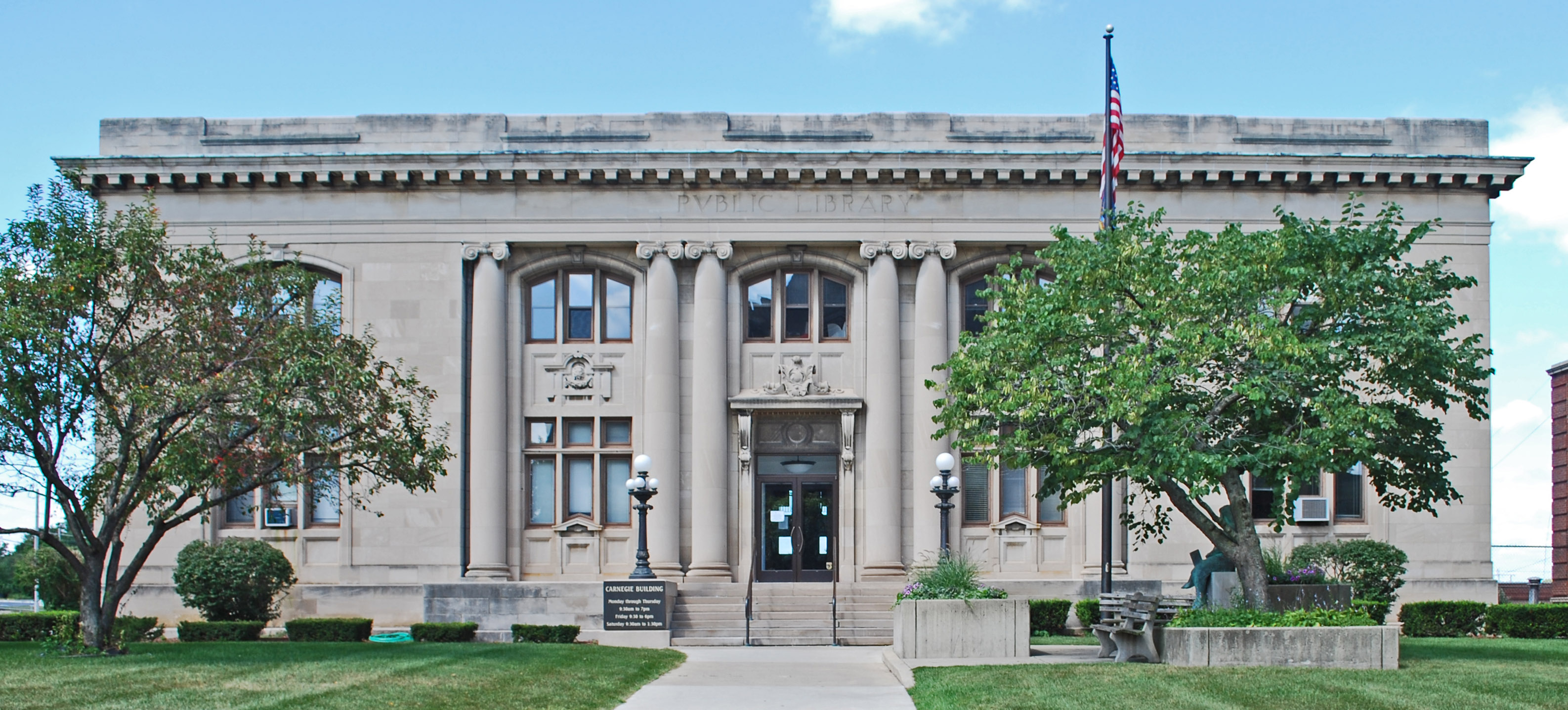
- The Jackson Carnegie Library, main library of the JDL
- 42°14′52″N 84°24′41″W
- Location: Jackson County, Michigan, United States
- Type: Library system
- Established: 1978
- Branches: 13

Other information
- Website: myjdl.com

The Jackson District Library is the public library system serving Jackson County, Michigan. Founded in 1978 from the merger of two local libraries, its history dates back to the formation of a library association in downtown Jackson in the 1860s.

The Jackson District Library provides services with 13 branches throughout Jackson County and a bookmobile. The main branch is the Jackson Carnegie Library in downtown Jackson.

== History ==
The Jackson Public Library dates back to the mid-1860s, with the opening of a reading room at the Jackson Young Men's Association. The reading room was only open to association members, but proved popular. The reading room became a public library in the mid-1880s, with new funding from the City of Jackson.

The Jackson Public Library applied for a grant to build a new Carnegie library in 1900. Its location in downtown Jackson's Bloomfield Building had become cramped, and Andrew Carnegie had recently expanded the pace of his program of library construction. An initial grant of $50,000 (equivalent to $1,500,957 in 2024) was made in 1901. Zelie Emerson, a member of the library committee and a personal acquaintance of Carnegie's, convinced Carnegie to provide an additional $20,000 to overcome difficulties during construction. The Jackson Carnegie Library opened in 1906, and continues in operation today.

In Jackson County, demand for library services increased in the early 1900s. Library service was supported by an innovative program of the Michigan State Library, the "traveling library," which sent books by U.S. mail to schools and private clubs in rural Michigan, including Jackson County. The Jackson County Library was founded in 1929, as the second county library system in the state. Books were made available at private businesses and schools throughout the county.

A countywide vote in 1977 provided a dedicated source of property tax revenue for the city and county libraries, both of which faced issues with financials and duplication of services. With this funding secured, the Jackson Public Library and Jackson County Library merged, beginning service as the Jackson District Library in 1978.

The library installed its first digital catalog in 1993, in cooperation with Jackson Community College.

== Locations ==
The JDL system includes 13 locations, many of which are adaptive reuses of existing and historic buildings. Examples of adaptive reuse in JDL branches include the Brooklyn Branch, in a former post office; the Concord Branch, in the former Concord Opera House; and the Parma Branch, in a former interurban station.

Jackson District Library locations
Location	Address	Founded	Present building opened	Website
Brooklyn Branch	207 N. Main St, Brooklyn	1918	1998, remodeled & expanded in 2021	
Carnegie Library	244 W. Michigan Av, Jackson	1865	1906	
Concord Branch	108 S. Main St, Concord	1903	2006	
Eastern Branch	3125 E. Michigan Av, Jackson	1914	1987, remodeled in 2024	
Grass Lake Branch	130 W. Michigan Av, Grass Lake	1935	1977	
Hanover Branch	118 W. Main St, Hanover	1927	1976	
Henrietta Branch	11744 Bunkerhill Rd, Henrietta Township	1982	2000	
Meijer Branch	2699 Airport Rd, Jackson	1928	1983	
Napoleon Branch	6755 Brooklyn Rd, Napoleon	1930	1962	
Parma Branch	102 Church St, Parma	1922	1937	
Spring Arbor Branch	122 Star Rd, Spring Arbor	1965	2023	
Springport Branch	116 Mechanic St, Springport	1901	1981	
Summit Branch	104 W. Bird St, Summit Township	1939	1956	
