= Pabst Mansion =

- Frederick Pabst House
- U.S. National Register of Historic Places
- Wisconsin Register of Historic Places
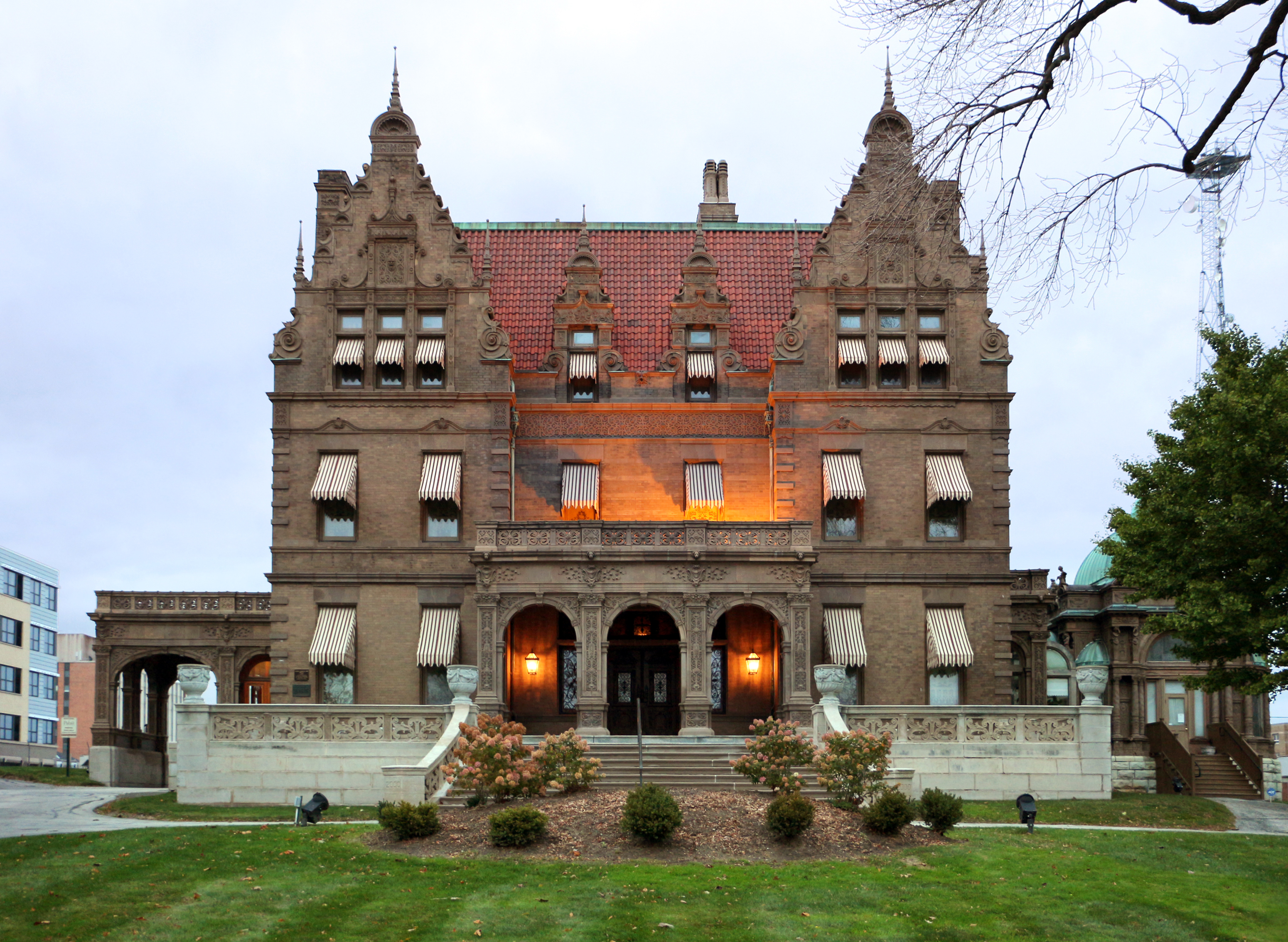

- Location within Wisconsin Location within the United States
- Interactive map showing the location for Pabst Mansion
- Location: 2000 W. Wisconsin Ave. Milwaukee, Wisconsin, U.S.
- Coordinates: 43°2′21.37″N 87°56′16.74″W
- Area: 1.5 acres (0.61 ha)
- Built: 1892
- Architect: George Ferry
- Architectural style: Flemish Renaissance Revival
- NRHP reference No.: 75000073

Significant dates
- Added to NRHP: April 21, 1975
- Designated WRHP: 1989

The Pabst Mansion is a grand Flemish Renaissance Revival-styled house built in 1892 in Milwaukee, Wisconsin, United States, for Captain Frederick Pabst (1836–1904), founder of the Pabst Brewing Company. In 1975 it was placed on the National Register of Historic Places, and is now a historic house museum, offering tours to the public.

== History ==
In 1848, as a 12-year-old boy, Frederick Pabst immigrated with his family from Thuringia, Germany to Milwaukee. Frederick joined the Goodrich Line steamships, working his way up from cabin boy on ships sailing Lake Michigan, eventually to captain in 1857. In 1862 the young steamship captain married Maria Best, whose father owned Best and Company, one of the largest breweries in Milwaukee. In 1864 Pabst joined the family business and within a few years was leading it. By 1874 Best & Co. was the largest brewery in the U.S., and in 1889 was renamed the Pabst Brewing Company.

Around 1890 Captain Pabst commissioned Milwaukee architect George Bowman Ferry to design a mansion in the Flemish Renaissance Revival style. On June 27, 1890, a building permit was issued for the construction of the home that would take two years to build. Ferry had designed a three-story house, dignified, with a pressed brick exterior, corner quoins, decorated with carved stone and terra cotta ornament. Hallmarks of the Flemish Renaissance Revival style are the symmetry and the shaped parapets that front the gable ends. Inside was originally a men's parlor decorated in mahogany on one side and a ladies' parlor on the other, decorated in white enamel.

The Pabst family lived at the mansion from 1892 until 1908, when the Archdiocese of Milwaukee purchased the mansion. The archdiocese moved the Baroque-styled conservatory to the east side of the Pabst house, using it as the archbishop's chapel. For the next 67 years, five Archbishops as well as many priests and sisters lived at the Pabst mansion.

In 1975 the Archdiocese (which had previously wanted to have the grand house demolished) put the mansion up for sale, with the hope that a historic preservation group would purchase it and restore it to its former glory. In 1978, Wisconsin Heritages, Inc., purchased the mansion, opening it to the public in May of that year. Until the purchase, the mansion had been slated to be demolished to make way for a parking structure.

In 1998, Wisconsin Heritages, Inc., was renamed Captain Frederick Pabst Mansion, Inc. The mansion is open to the public, with daily tours.

The mansion was the set for a series of 1980 Boston Store holiday commercials. The mansion was also briefly pictured during season 4 of the television sitcom How I Met Your Mother as the childhood home of the character Robin Scherbatsky in the 2008 episode "Happily Ever After".

=== Historic preservation ===
External videos
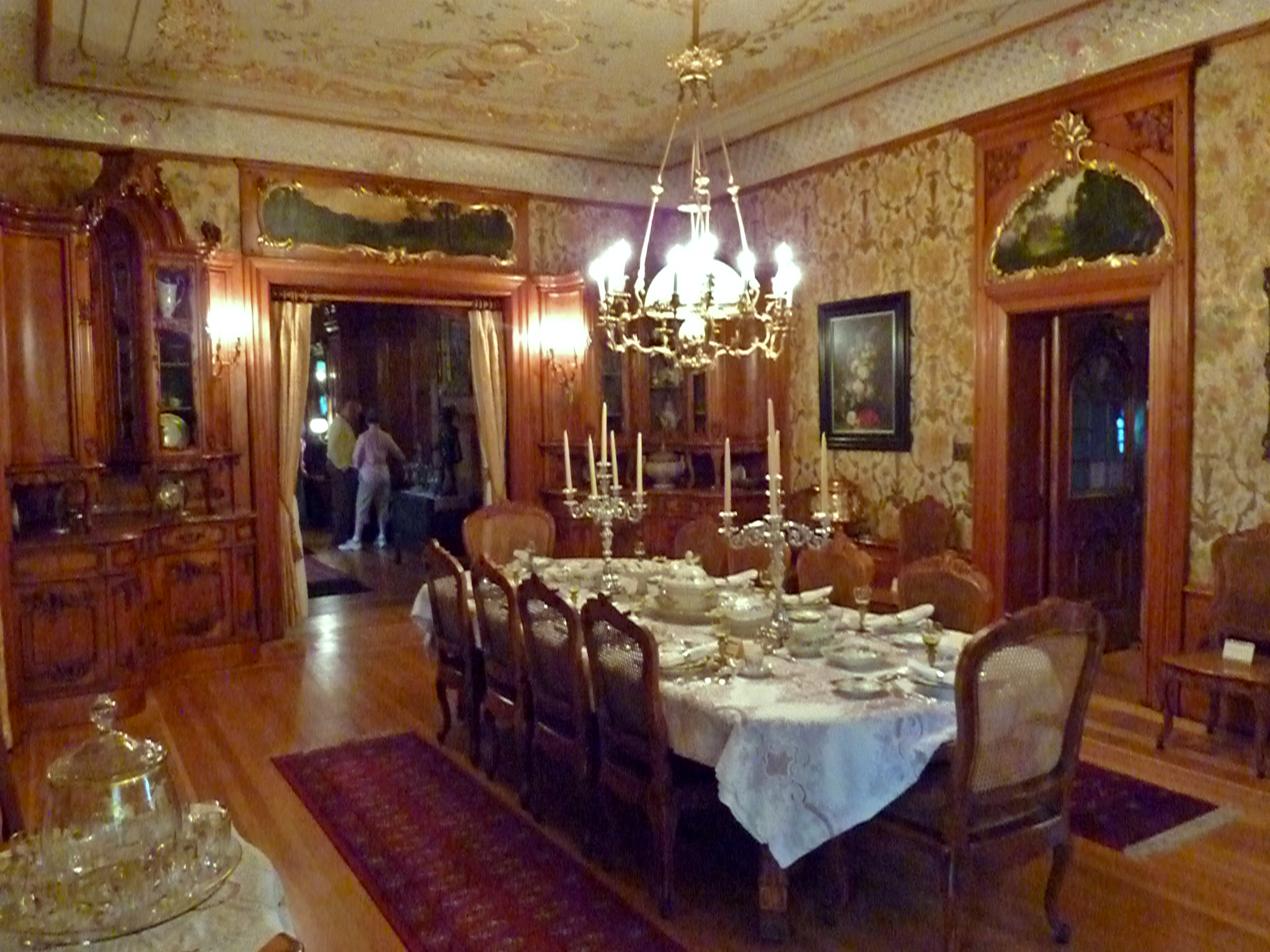
- Pabst Mansion – Short Film, Pabst Mansion

The first restored room of the Pabst Mansion was the main Dining Room. The ceiling, cove, walls, and paintings above the doors were all painted white by the archdiocese. In order to find the original paint color, restorers took down three large mirrors on the eastern wall that had hung there since the Captain's residence. The archdiocese had painted around the mirrors, but not underneath. A perfect color palette was preserved from which the restorers used to repaint the other walls.

Recent historic preservation efforts are focusing on the Master Suite. In February and March 2011 paint analysis was performed on the ceilings of the Master Bedroom and Sitting Room. Found under layers of paint were palm fronds painted directly onto the ceiling in the four corners of the Sitting Room. Experts used pictures taken around 1900 to find the location of items painted on the ceiling that otherwise would have been lost. The most recent restoration work in Emma's Room/the Regency Room has been completed.

== Gallery ==
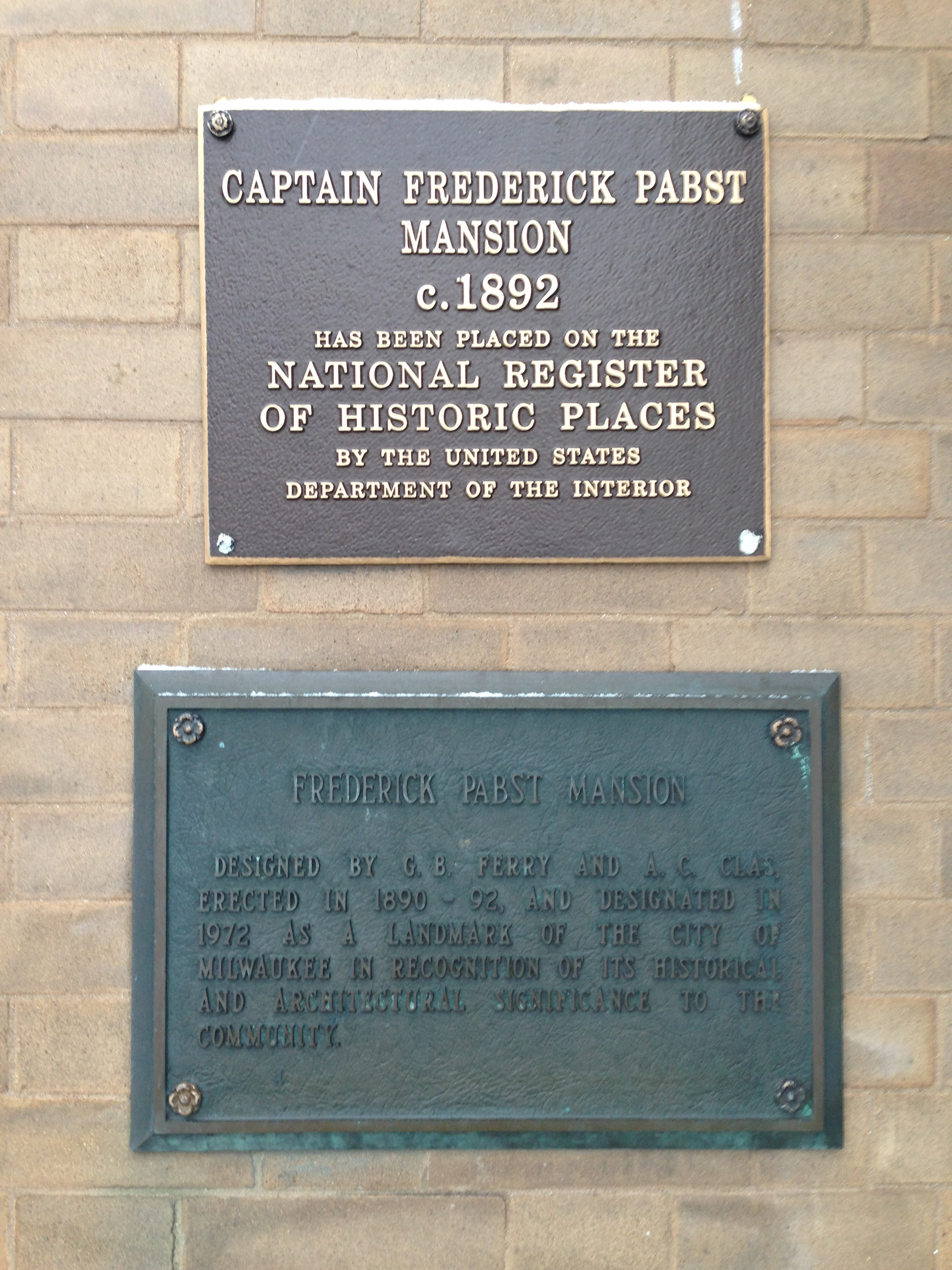
historic marker

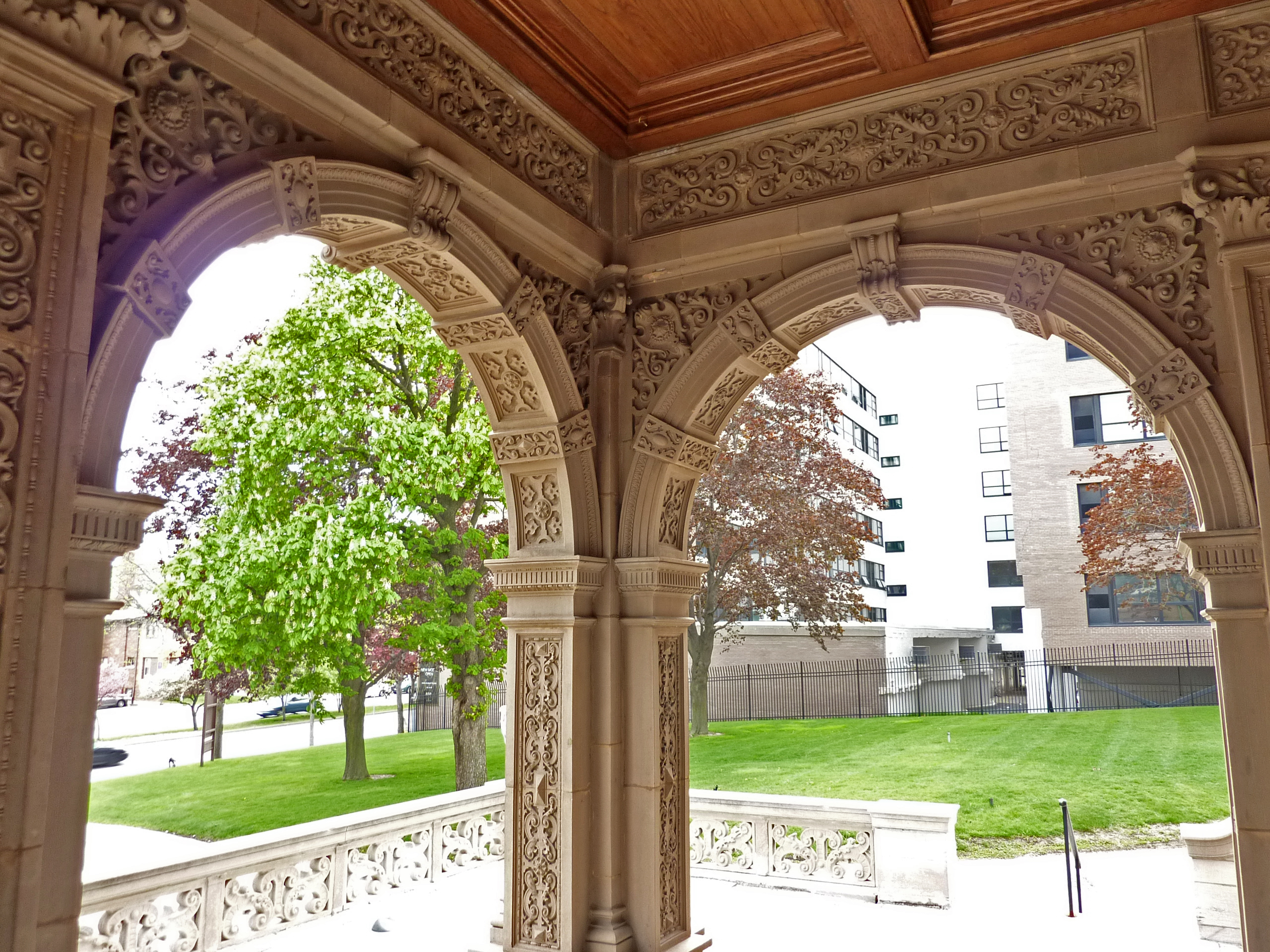
Interior of the neo-Renaissance front porch

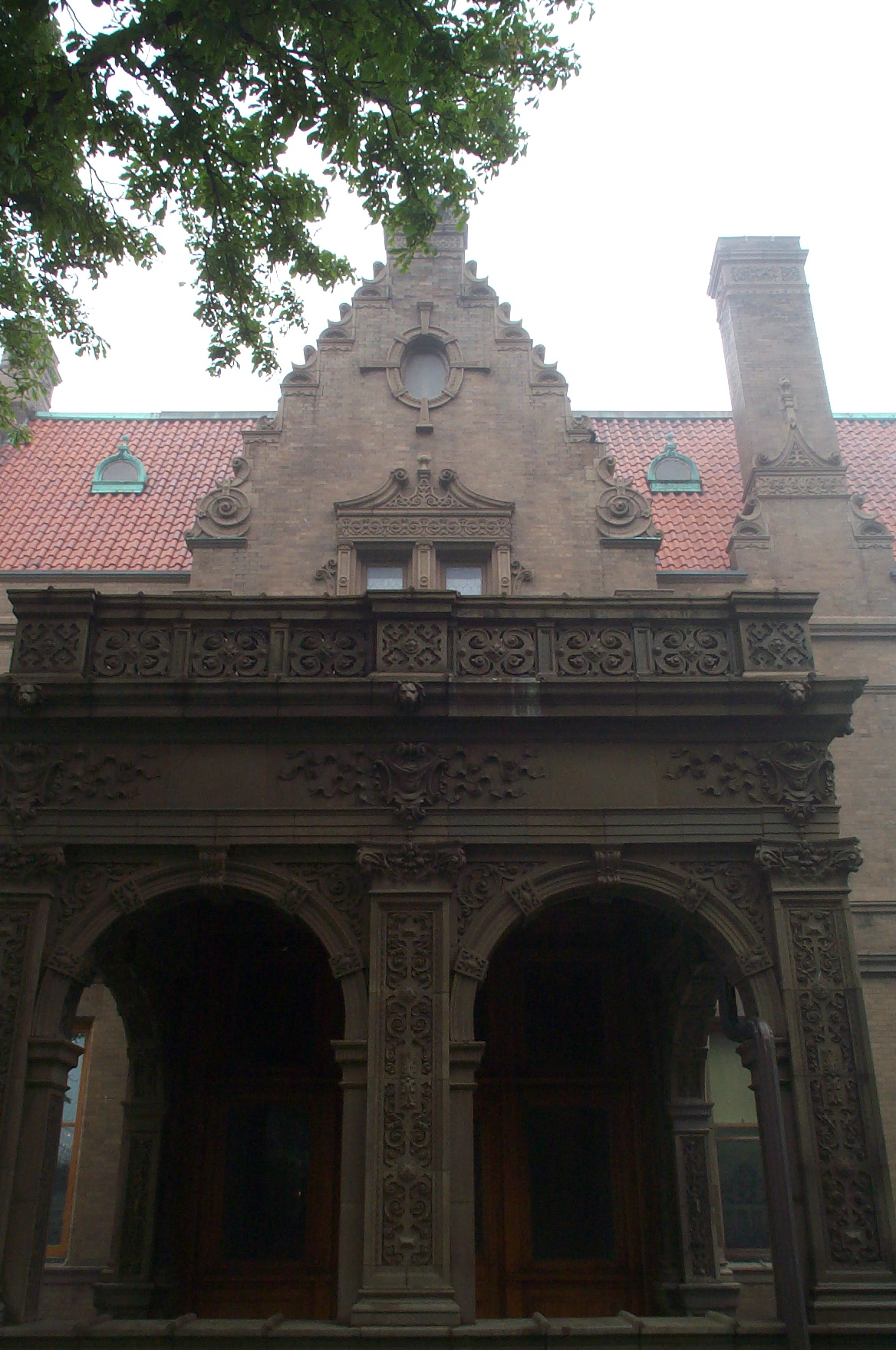
The porte-cochère

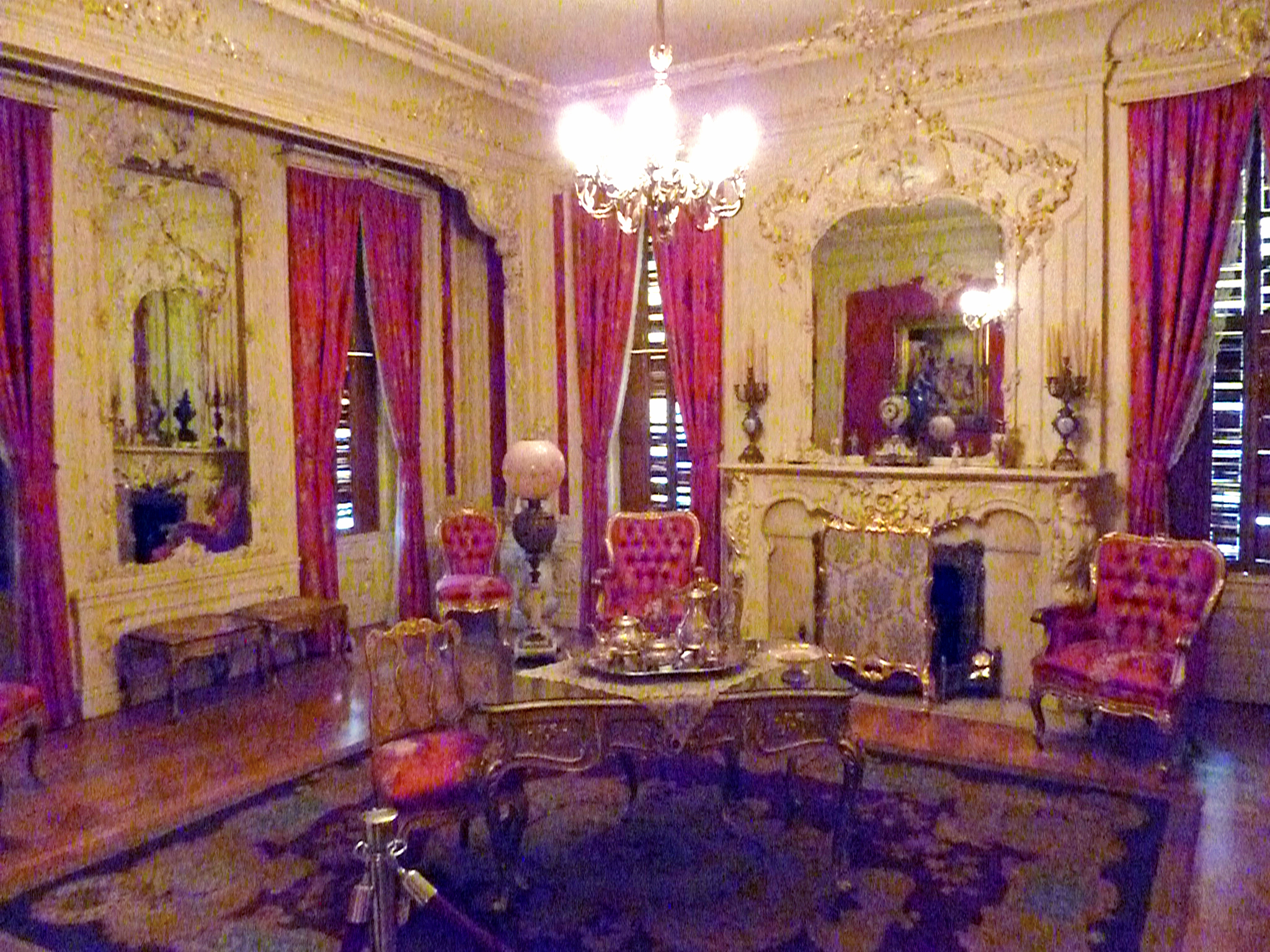
The neo-Rococo main parlor

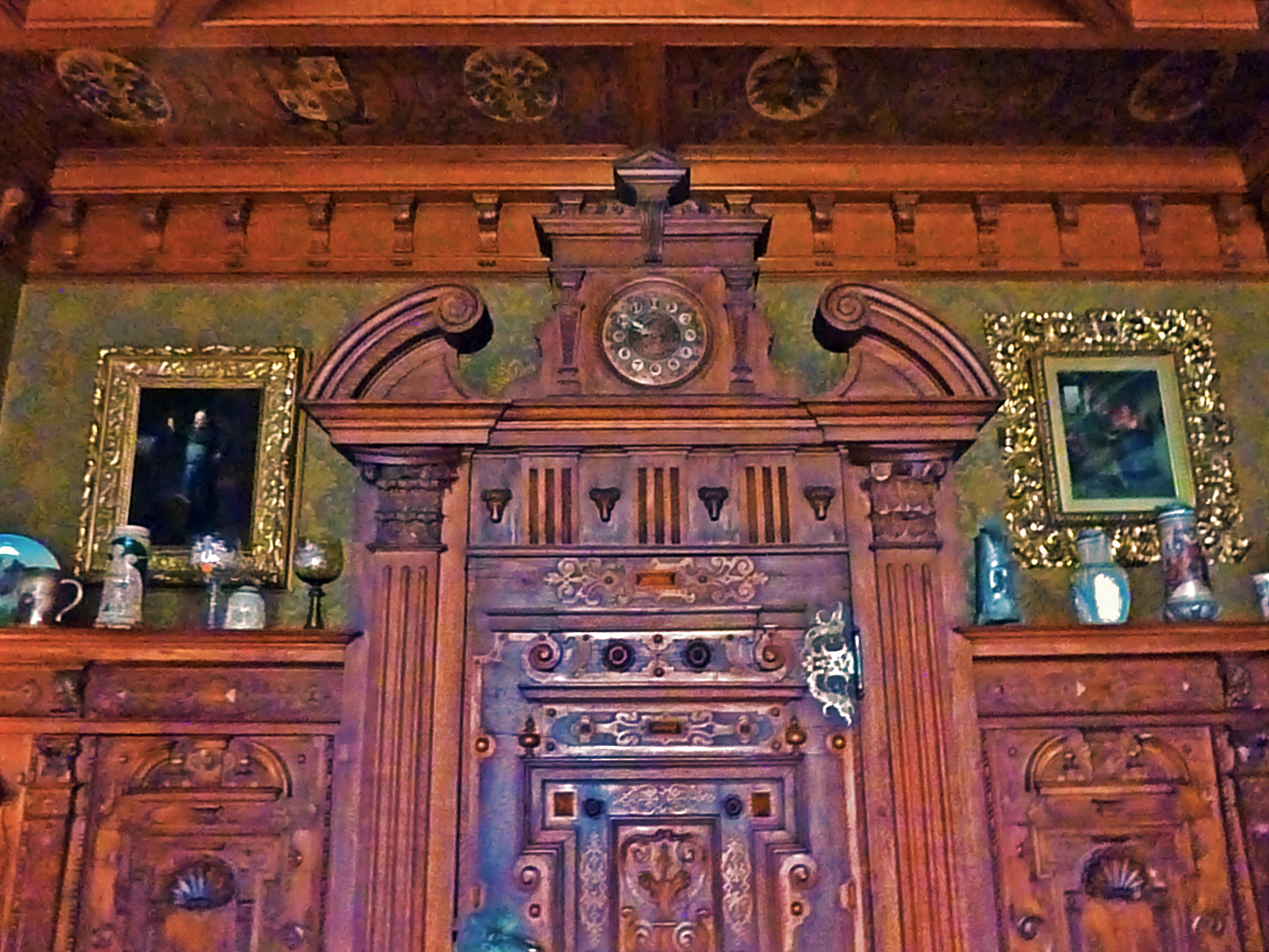
East wall of the neo-Renaissance study

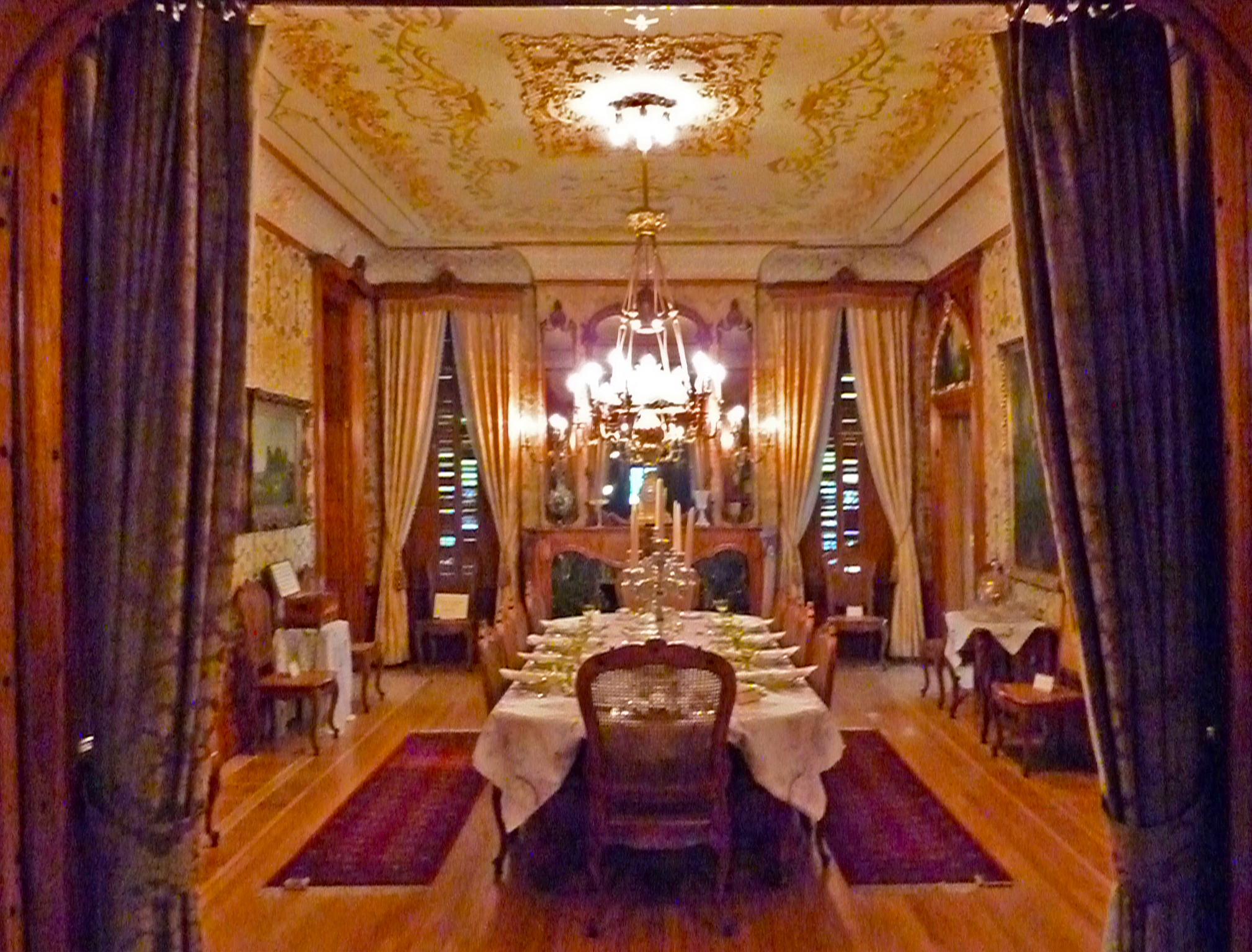
The dining room from the west

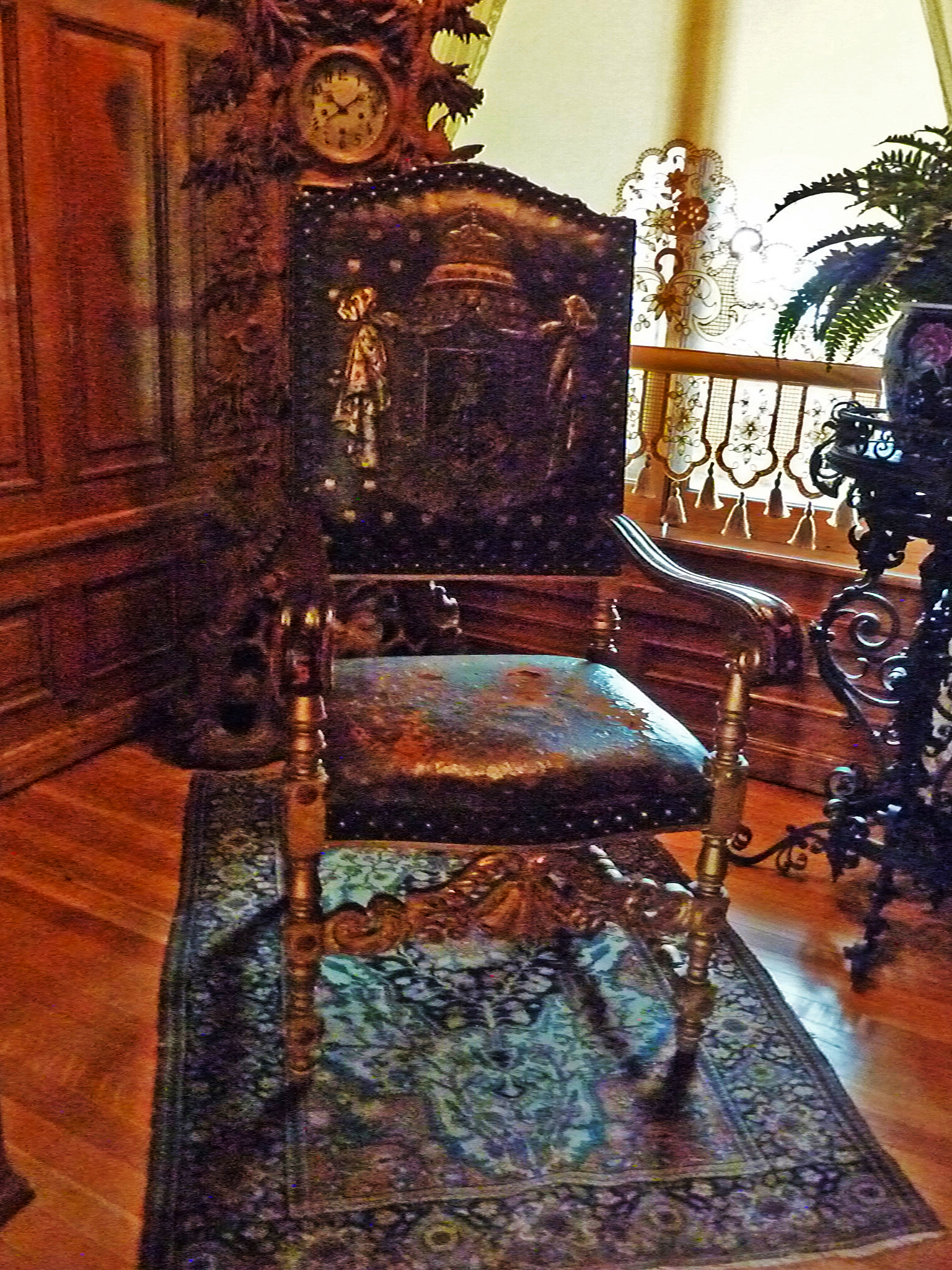
Chair off the first floor vestibule

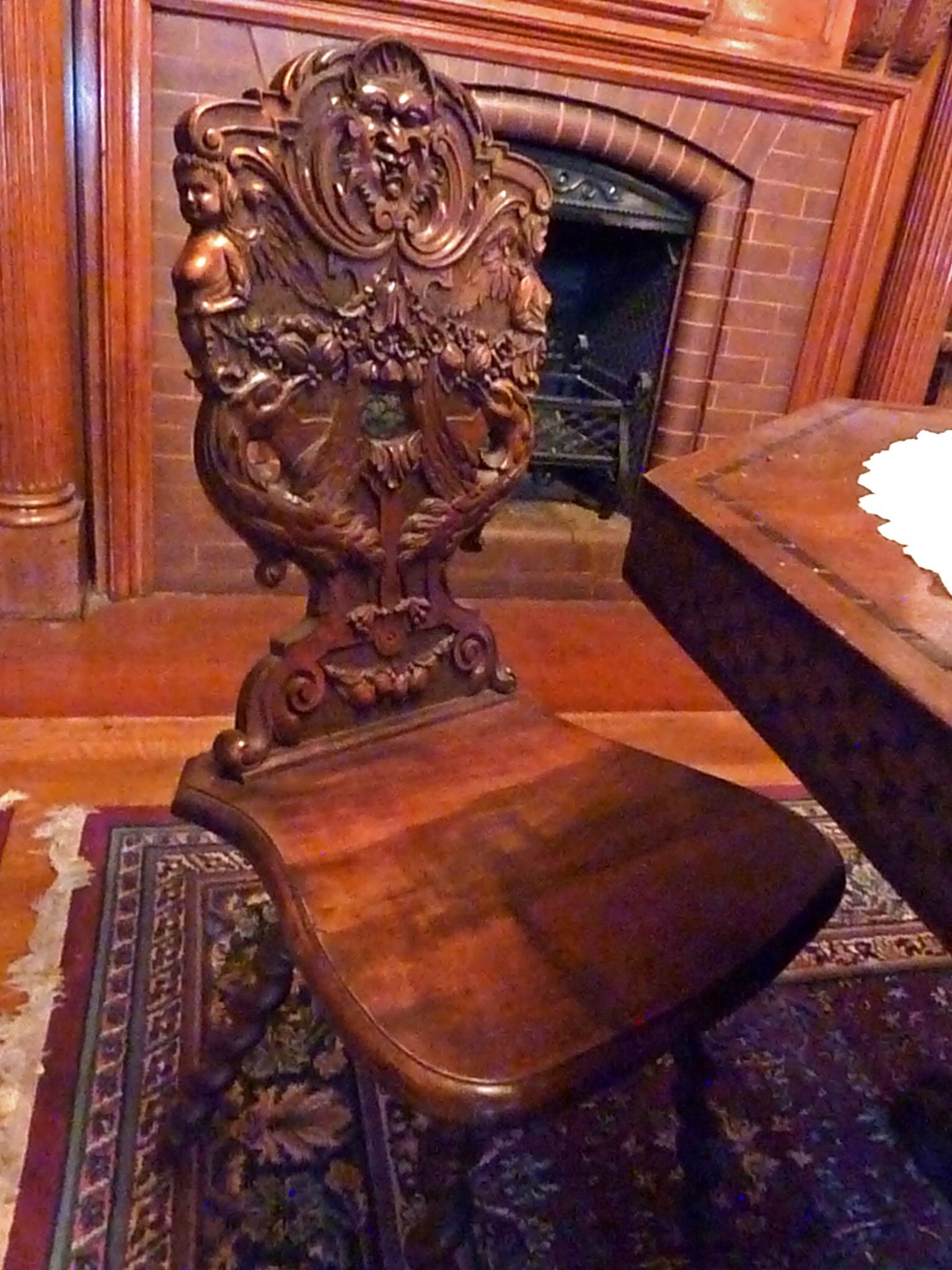
Neo-Renaissance chair on the second floor landing

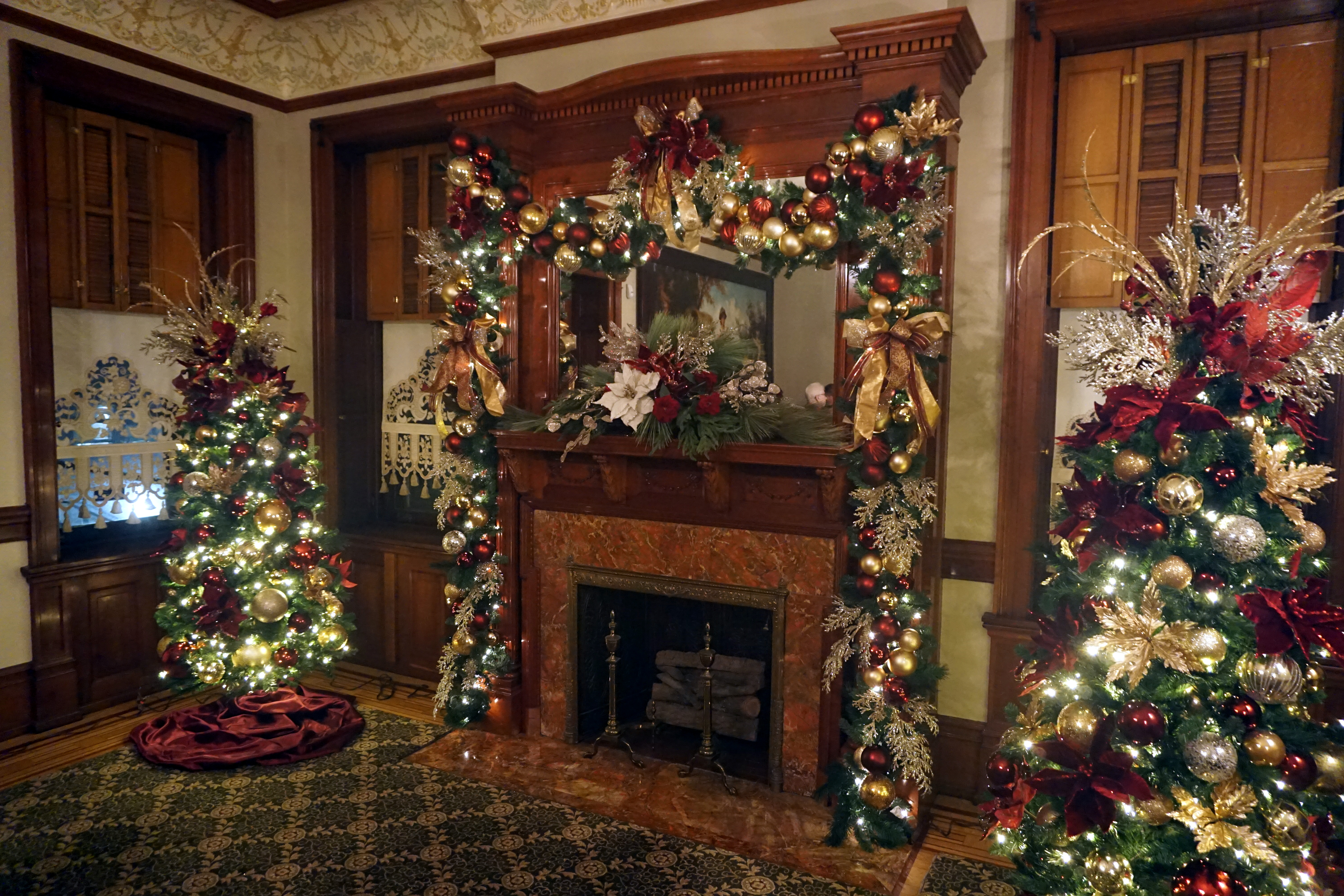
Christmas at the Pabst Mansion

== See also ==
- Historic preservation
- List of Gilded Age mansions
- National Register of Historic Places listings in Milwaukee, Wisconsin
