= George Bowman Ferry =

American architect

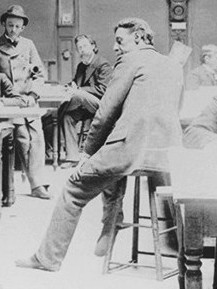
- Ferry (seated, facing away from the camera) at work with his architects
- Born: 1851; Springfield, Massachusetts, US
- Died: 1918 (aged 66–67); Milwaukee, Wisconsin, US
- Burial place: Lake Mills, Wisconsin, US
- Education: Mass. Institute of Technology
- Occupation: Architect
- Employer: Ferry & Clas
- Spouse: Cora Phillips

George Bowman Ferry FAIA (1851–1918) was an architect who was a partner in the Milwaukee architectural firm Ferry & Clas.

== Biography ==
George Bowman Ferry was born in Springfield, Massachusetts, in 1851. He attended the Massachusetts Institute of Technology in 1871–72. In the mid-1870s he formed the firm of Ferry & Gardner in Springfield. His works as a member of this firm include a now-demolished office building for The Republican, completed in 1878.

Ferry left Springfield for Milwaukee in 1881 and was one of Wisconsin's first academically trained architects. After several years of private practice, in 1890 he formed the firm of Ferry & Clas with Alfred C. Clas. The partnership was dissolved in 1912, when Ferry returned to private practice.

== Personal life ==
Ferry was married to Cora Phillips of Lake Mills, Wisconsin. He died in 1918 at his home in Milwaukee. He is buried in Lake Mills, Wisconsin. His papers were donated to the Captain Frederick Pabst Mansion by William P. Ferry, George Bowman Ferry's grandson, in 2001.

In 1885, Ferry became a Fellow of the Western Association of Architects, which merged with the American Institute of Architects in 1889. Ferry remained a member and Fellow of the organization until his death.

== Work ==
For his work in partnership with Alfred Clas, see Ferry & Clas.

- Wisconsin Woman's Club (1887) at 813 East Kilbourn Avenue
- James McIntosh residence (1916) at 2704 E. Hartford Avenue
