= List of public art in Milwaukee =

This is a list of public art in Milwaukee, Wisconsin. Works are listed from oldest to newest.

The list contains only works of public art freely accessible outdoors, and not, for example, works inside museums that charge admission. Most of the works are sculptures.

== Artworks ==
Image	Title / subject	Location and coordinates	Date	Artist / designer	Type	Material	Dimensions	Designation	Owner / administrator	Notes
	Spirit of Commerce	Jackson Park	1881	Gustave Haug	allegorical	zinc	15 ft		Milwaukee County Department of Parks, Recreation and Culture	Allegorical figure
	Washington Monument	Court of Honor, Wisconsin Avenue 43°02′19.42″N 87°55′22.43″W	1885	Richard Henry Park	portrait	bronze	110 × 41 × 41 in		City of Milwaukee	Figurative portrait of George Washington
	Juneau Monument	Juneau Park 43°2′33.86″N 87°53′53.76″W	1887	Richard Henry Park	portrait	bronze	13 ft × 5 1/2 ft		Milwaukee County Department of Parks, Recreation and Culture	Figurative portrait of Solomon Juneau
	Leif, the Discoverer	Juneau Park 43°02′34.20″N 87°53′54.48″W	1887	Anne Whitney	portrait	bronze	8 ft		Milwaukee County Department of Parks, Recreation and Culture	Figurative portrait of Leif Ericson
	Henry Bergh	Wisconsin Humane Society 43°02′20.38″N 87°58′10.11″W	1891	James H. Mahoney	portrait	bronze	9 × 3 × 2 1/2 ft		Wisconsin Humane Society	Figurative portrait of Henry Bergh
	T.A. Chapman Memorial	Forest Home Cemetery 42°59.97′N 87°56.59′W	1896	Daniel Chester French	memorial	bronze	62 × 41 × 23 in		City of Milwaukee	Allegorical figure
	Eight Stone Lions	Lake Park 43°03′56.56″N 87°52′16.36″W	1897	Paul Kupper	architectural ornament	stone	36 × 30 × 65 in each		Milwaukee County Department of Parks, Recreation and Culture	Lions adorn bridges
	The Victorious Charge	Court of Honor, Wisconsin Avenue 43°02′19.44″N 87°55′26.69″W	1898	John S. Conway	memorial	bronze	118 × 240 in		City of Milwaukee	Civil War memorial
	Carnival Column	Court of Honor, Wisconsin Avenue 43°02′19.44″N 87°55′26.69″W	1900	Alfred C. Clas	obelisk	Bedford limestone	65 ft		City of Milwaukee	Midsummer Carnival landmark
	Kosciuszko Monument	Kosciuszko Park	1903	Gaetano Trentanove	equestrian	bronze	15 ft.		Milwaukee County Department of Parks, Recreation and Culture	
	Christian Wahl	Wahl Park 43°06′11.86″N 87°58′21.69″W	1903	Gaetano Trentanove	bust	bronze	2 × 2 × 2 ft		Milwaukee County Department of Parks, Recreation and Culture	Bust of Christian Wahl
	Goethe-Schiller Monument	Washington Park 43°03′10.33″N 87°58′12.26″W	1908	Ernst Friedrich August Rietschel	portrait	bronze	12 ft		Milwaukee County Department of Parks, Recreation and Culture	Figurative portrait of Goethe and Schiller
	Robert Burns	Burns Commons	1909	William Grant Stevenson	portrait	bronze	12 ft × 42 in × 42 in		Milwaukee County Department of Parks, Recreation and Culture	Figurative portrait of Robert Burns
	R.D. Whitehead Monument	Chavez, Bow and Pearl 43°00′55.49″N 87°55′59.15″W	1910	Sigvald Asbjørnsen	relief	bronze	35 1/2 × 35 1/2 × 3 1/2 in		City of Milwaukee	
	Lapham Memorial	UWM Lapham Hall 43°04′33.5″N 87°52′58.9″W	1915	Albert H. Atkins	relief	bronze	27 1/2 in × 37 in plaque; 7 ft diameter boulder, 40,000 lbs		University of Wisconsin–Milwaukee	Relief portrait of Increase Lapham
	Erastus B. Wolcott	Lake Park	1920	Francis Herman Packer	portrait	bronze	15 ft 4 in		Milwaukee County Department of Parks, Recreation and Culture	Figurative portrait
	Steuben Monument	Lisbon, Lloyd and Sherman	1921	J. Otto Schweizer	portrait	bronze	188 in		Milwaukee County Department of Parks, Recreation and Culture	Figurative portrait
	Starke Memorial	Forest Home Cemetery	1921	Rogert Ingersoll Aitken	memorial	bronze	69 x 62 in		Forest Home Cemetery	allegorical figure
	Boy with Goose		1926	Girolamo Piccoli	portrait	bronze			Milwaukee County Department of Parks, Recreation and Culture	Figurative portrait
	Kneeling Camels	Tripoli Shrine Temple	1928	Paul Moulon	figure	stone	84 x 60 x 25 in		Tripoli Shrine Temple	figurative
	Pulaski Monument	Pulaski Park 42°59′56.95″N 87°56′02.74″W	1931	Joseph Kiselewski	portrait	bronze	7 ft.		Milwaukee County Department of Parks, Recreation and Culture	Figurative portrait
	Spanish–American War Soldier	Court of Honor, Wisconsin Avenue	1932	American Bronze Company	portrait	bronze	7 ft 4 in		City of Milwaukee	Figurative portrait
	Abraham Lincoln	War Memorial Center 43°02′24.98″N 87°53′52.11″W	1934	Gaetano Cecere	portrait	bronze	10 1/2 × 16 × 20 ft		Milwaukee County Department of Parks, Recreation and Culture	Figurative portrait of Abraham Lincoln
	Fishing	Parklawn, Housing Authority of the City of Milwaukee	1938	Karl Kahlich	figure	limestone			Housing Authority of the City of Milwaukee	WPA work
	Music	Parklawn, Housing Authority of the City of Milwaukee	1938	Karl Kahlich	figure	limestone			Housing Authority of the City of Milwaukee	WPA work
	Bird and Fish	Froedtert Malting Company	1948	Gustav Bohland	figure	bronze				
	The Sower	Froedtert Malting Company	1952	Gustav Bohland	figure	bronze				
	The Reaper	Froedtert Malting Company	1952	Gustav Bohland	figure	bronze				
	Pere Jacques Marquette	Pere Marquette Park	1957	Aldo Pera, restored by Tom Queoff	portrait	marble	69 x 32 x 32 in		Milwaukee County Department of Parks, Recreation and Culture	figurative portrait
	Immigrant Mother	Cathedral Square Park 43°02′30.16″N 87°54′18.31″W	1960	Ivan Meštrović	portrait	bronze	8 ft × 28 in × 33 in		Milwaukee County Department of Parks, Recreation and Culture	Depicts a mother and children
	Four Freedoms	Milwaukee Public Library Atkinson Avenue Branch	1961	Dick Wiken	sculpture	green bronze, gold bronze, stainless steel and cast magnesium, colored gold			Milwaukee Public Library	
	Polyphony	UWM Union	1963	Egon Weiner	abstract	bronze	10 ft 5 in × 10 ft 5 in × 5 ft 4 in		University of Wisconsin–Milwaukee	
	Woodland Indian and Whistling Swans	Milwaukee Public Museum 43°02′25″N 87°55′18″W	1963	Marshall Fredericks		bronze	40 ft × 28 ft × 3 ft		Milwaukee County Department of Parks, Recreation and Culture	
	Patrick Cudahy Memorial	Sheridan Park, Cudahy	1965	Felix de Weldon		bronze	9 ft		Milwaukee County Department of Parks, Recreation and Culture	
	Steel Reborn	Menomonee Valley	1965	Charles Toman		steel	35 ft		Miller Compressing Company	
	King Gambrinus	Best Place Tavern, Pabst Brewery Complex	1967	Carl Kuehns		metal	96 in		Pabst Brewing Company	
	Hermes	Villa Terrace Decorative Arts Museum	1967 installation	unknown		marble	96 x 28 x 22 in		Milwaukee Art Museum	
	Three Bronze Discs	UWM Golda Meir Library 43.077169°N 87.880285°W	1967	James Wines	fountain	bronze	10 ft 8 in × 5 ft		University of Wisconsin–Milwaukee	
	Laureate	Marcus Center for the Performing Arts	1968	Seymour Lipton	abstract	nickel	150 in × 68 in		Milwaukee County Department of Parks, Recreation and Culture	Geometric abstract fountain
	The Spirit of Polonia	Milwaukee County Courthouse, Clas Park 43.04071°N 87.92379°W	1969	Edmund Lewandowski	fountain	stainless steel and brass	15 × 36 × 17 1/2 ft		Milwaukee County Department of Parks, Recreation and Culture	Geometric abstract fountain
	Trigon	Marcus Center for the Performing Arts	1970	Allen Ditson	abstract	stainless steel	132 × 103 × 72 in		Milwaukee County Department of Parks, Recreation and Culture	Abstract figures
	The Great Double	MGIC Plaza	1971	Alicia Penalba	abstract	bronze	28 ft × 122 in × 98 in (12 tons)		Mortgage Guaranty Insurance Corporation	
	Space Game	Menomonee Valley	1971	Joseph Mendla	abstract	steel	83 x 76 x 56 in			
	Argo	Milwaukee Art Museum 43°2′24.35″N 87°53′47.14″W	1974	Alexander Liberman	abstract	steel	15 × 36 × 17 1/2 ft		Milwaukee Art Museum	
	Two Opposites Reaching Up Toward the Peak of Progress	Layton and Greenfield	1977	Tom Queoff	abstract	granite	94 x 24 x 10 in		City of Milwaukee	
	Referee	UW–Milwaukee Panther Arena, Kilbourn and 5th 43°02′30.04″N 87°55′03.94″W	1978	Tom Queoff	abstract	marble	114 in		City of Milwaukee	
	Ruins X	Patrick and Beatrice Haggerty Museum of Art	1978	Ernest Carl Shaw	abstract	steel			Marquette University	geometric abstract
	Peter John	Unknown (removed from site in 2015)	1978	John Raimondi	abstract	steel	36 x 27 x 13 ft			abstract geometric
	General Douglas MacArthur	Milwaukee County Courthouse, MacArthur Square	1979	Robert Dean	portrait	stainless steel and brass	9 1/2 ft		City of Milwaukee	figurative portrait
	Monumental Holistic III	Grounds of the Milwaukee Art Museum	1979	Betty Gold	sculpture	steel	101 1/2 × 173 × 184 1/2 in		Milwaukee Art Museum	
	The Calling	Museum Center Park 43°2′20″N 87°53′58″W	1981	Mark di Suvero	abstract	steel	40 ft		Milwaukee Art Museum	Geometric abstract
	Spirit of the Firefighter	Fire Engine Company #37	1983	Mark Jeffries	portrait	bronze	76 x 23 x 14 in		City of Milwaukee	Figurative portrait
	Holocaust Memorial	Jewish Museum Milwaukee 43°02′52.48″N 87°53′42.35″W	1983	Claire Lieberman	abstract	steel, granite, brick	120 in		Jewish Museum Milwaukee	Geometric abstract
	Family	Henry Reuss Federal Plaza 43°02′20.31″N 87°54′53.20″W	1983	Helaine Blumenfeld	abstract	granite	18 × 58 × 27 in		Federal Plaza Associates	Biomorphic abstract
	Angel in a Cage	Menomonee Valley 43°01′50.67″N 87°55′52.73″W	1983	Richard Pflieger	abstract	steel and fiberglass	42 ft			
	Dauntless Guardian	Fire Engine Company #9	1984	Jeune Nowak Wussow	figure	bronze	120 in		City of Milwaukee	
	Menomonee	Menomonee Valley 43°01′51.95″N 87°55′54.25″W	1985	Hilary Goldblatt	abstract	steel	70 x 54 in			
	Votive XX	Marquette University	1985	Ernest Shaw (sculptor)	sculpture	steel	126 x 50 x 16 3/4 in		Patrick and Beatrice Haggerty Museum of Art	
	Oops, Missed	Menomonee Valley	1987	Bernard Peck	abstract	steel and fiberglass	9 ft			
	Ex Stasis	Marquette University	1988	Richard Lippold	abstract	stainless steel and aluminum			Marquette University	geometric abstract
	Fire and Water	Fire Engine Company #25	1988	John Luttropp	abstract	concrete, neon, plexiglass			City of Milwaukee	architectural abstract
	Deflected Jets	Fire Engine Company #29 42°58′49.42″N 88°01′04.83″W	1988	Guido Peter Brink	abstract	stainless steel	7 ft		City of Milwaukee	
	Milwaukee	UWM Golda Meir Library 43.077436°N 87.881357°W	1989	George Mossman Greenamyer		steel	18 x 5 x 20 ft		University of Wisconsin–Milwaukee	
	Celebrating the Arts	Roosevelt Middle School 43°03′10.51″N 87°55′17.71″W	1989	Narendra M. Patel	abstract	steel	20 x 14 x 6 ft		Milwaukee Public Schools	
	Letter Carriers' Monument	Second St. and Wells St. 43°02′24.52″N 87°54′46.98″W	1989	Elliot Offner	portrait	bronze	66 × 67 × 56 in		City of Milwaukee	figurative portrait
	Ribbons VI	removed from Menomonee Valley	1989	Stephen Fischer	abstract	steel	162 x 6 x 23 in			
	On Watch	Fire and Police Safety Academy 43°08′18.46″N 87°57′07.91″W	1990	David M. Wanner	portrait	bronze	6 x 5 ft		City of Milwaukee	figurative portrait
	Engine Company No. 10	Historic Third Ward on Broadway	1990	Michael Casper	portrait	bronze	56 x 43 x 45 in		City of Milwaukee	figurative portrait
	Chrysalis	Girl Scouts of Milwaukee, 131 S. 69th St.	1990	Beth Sahagian	abstract	bronze and limestone	75 x 30 x 20 in		City of Milwaukee	
	Pledge Allegiance	O'Donnell Park	1991	Glenna Goodacre	portrait	bronze	15 x 97 x 100 in		Milwaukee County Department of Parks, Recreation and Culture	figurative portrait
	Happy-Go-Luckies of Nature and Technology	University of Wisconsin–Milwaukee 43°4′32″N 87°53′4″W	1992	Guido Peter Brink		steel	12 x 12 x 8 ft		University of Wisconsin–Milwaukee	
	Buildings 1992	103rd and Fond du Lac	1992	Susan Walsh		stainless steel			City of Milwaukee	
	Gear 23	Fire Engine Company #4	1992	Steven Feren	memorial	mixed media	96 x 112 x 43 in		City of Milwaukee	
	Untitled	Sixth District Police Station	1992	Narendra Patel	architectural	mixed media	120 x 60 x 60 in		City of Milwaukee	
	Bay View Series	Bay View Library 42°59′52.89″N 87°53′59.57″W	1993	Peter Flanary	landscape	mixed media			City of Milwaukee	
	Cleopatra's Wedge	Burns Commons	1993	Beverly Pepper	abstract	steel	18 ft		City of Milwaukee	monumental abstract
	Rainbow Machine	Patrick and Beatrice Haggerty Museum of Art	1993	Joseph Burlini	kinetic		216 in		Marquette University	kinetic abstract
	Jantar-Mantar	University of Wisconsin–Milwaukee	1995	Narendra Patel		concrete			University of Wisconsin–Milwaukee	
	Wisconsin Workers Memorial	Zeidler Park 43°02′13.31″N 87°54′55.12″W	1995	Terese Agnew and Mary Zebell	landscape	mixed media			Milwaukee County Department of Parks, Recreation and Culture	integrated with park landscape
	The Last Alarm	Milwaukee Fire Department 43°02′40″N 87°55′22″W	1996	Robert Daus	portrait	bronze	48" tall		City of Milwaukee	
	Sharing the Load	Garden Park	1996	Dan Leonhardt	abstract	steel				
	Gertie the Duck	Wisconsin Avenue Bridge, Milwaukee River 43°2′19″N 87°54′37″W	1997	Gwendolyn Gillen	portrait	bronze	4 ft		City of Milwaukee	figurative portrait
	Martin Luther King, Jr. Memorial	MLK and Vine	1997	Erik Blome	portrait	bronze			YWCA of Greater Milwaukee	figurative portrait
	Walkways Through the Wall	Wisconsin Center 43°2′23″N 87°55′2″W	1998	Vito Acconci	architectural	painted cast concrete			Wisconsin Center District	integrated with building architecture
	City Yard	Delta Center 43°2′23″N 87°55′2″W	1998	Sheila Klein	architectural	mixed media			Wisconsin Center District	uses salvaged architectural ornament
	Cass Street Park	Cass Street Playground near Brady Street	1998	Marina Lee	gateway	fiberglass	192 x 192 x 60 in			
	You Rise Above the World	Riverwalk	1998	Richard Taylor	abstract	aluminum	120 x 60 x 48 in		Riverwalk BID	
	Love	Grounds of the Milwaukee Art Museum	1999	Robert Indiana	sculpture	polychrome aluminum	96 x 96 x 48 in		Milwaukee Art Museum	
	Vliet Street Commons	50th and Vliet	2000	Jill Sebastian	site-specific	concrete and steel				
	Kindred Ties	Fond du Lac Avenue, North Avenue and 21st Street	2000	Evelyn Patricia Terry		steel and glass			Spirit of Milwaukee	
	Blue Dress Park	Holton Street Viaduct	2000	Paul Druecke	site-specific	found				
	Eclipse	Prospect and Ogden	2000	Jill Sebastian	mosaic	mixed media	10 x 10 x 10 ft			
	Children of the West End	36th and Wisconsin	2000	Erick Blome	gateway	bronze	18 ft		Spirit of Milwaukee	
	Stone Bracelet	3rd and Walker	2000	Zoran Mojsilov	abstract	stone	145 in		Spirit of Milwaukee	
	Tending the Fire	Potawatomi Hotel & Casino	2000	MJM Studios	portrait	bronze			Potawatomi Historical and Cultural Board	
	Acqua Grylli	Milwaukee Riverwalk	2001	Beth Sahagian	gateway	bronze			City of Milwaukee	depicts a mythical female figure
	Birds of Knowledge of Good and Evil	Woman's Club of Wisconsin	2001	Magdalena Abakanowicz	abstract	aluminum			Woman's Club of Wisconsin	
	Topiary Lucere	Plankinton and Wisconsin	2001	Steve Feren	landscape	concrete, glass, fiber optic			Marriott International	
	Teamwork	Miller Park	2001	Omri Amrany	memorial	bronze	148 in		Miller Park	figurative portrait
	Aaron Monument	Miller Park	2001	Brian Maughan	memorial	bronze	84 in		Miller Park	figurative portrait
	Yount Monument	Miller Park	2001	Brian Maughan	memorial	bronze	84 in		Miller Park	figurative portrait
	Giving Gifts	General Mitchell International Airport	2002	Evelyn Patricia Terry		steel			Milwaukee County Department of Parks, Recreation and Culture	
	Mahatma Gandhi Memorial	Milwaukee County Courthouse, MacArthur Square	2002	Gautam Pal	portrait	bronze	96 in		Milwaukee County Department of Parks, Recreation and Culture	figurative portrait
	Tree of Life	Mitchell Boulevard Park 43.03640°N 87.97807°W	2002	Nancy Metz White		painted steel	96 in			
	Brady Street Beasts	Brady and Water	2002	Bill Reid		painted steel				
	Float	Sandburg Halls 43°04′45″N 87°52′57.21″W	2003	Peter Flanary		bronze and granite	180 × 35 × 75 in		University of Wisconsin–Milwaukee	
	Compass	North and Cambridge	2003	Gail Simpson	gateway	painted aluminum	264 in		Eastside BID #20	
	Dancing Through Life	Milwaukee Riverwalk, Pere Marquette Park	2003	Schomer Lichtner		painted steel	132 in		Riverwalk District BID	
	Tip	Gordon Park	2004	David Middlebrook	gateway	bronze, basalt, marble	40 x 20 ft		Milwaukee County Department of Parks, Recreation and Culture	
	Sentinels	Oak Leaf Trail near Brady Street 43°03′04″N 87°53′21″W	2005	John Barlow Hudson	abstract	granite			Milwaukee County Department of Parks, Recreation and Culture	
	Compass	Oak Leaf Trail near Brady Street 43.0520215°N 87.8902991°W	2005	John Barlow Hudson	abstract	steel and granite	15 x 4 x 4 ft		Milwaukee County Department of Parks, Recreation and Culture	
	A Beam of Sun to Shake the Sky	Milwaukee Public Library 43°2′24.27″N 87°55′20.55″W	2005	Richard Taylor	abstract	aluminum	168 x 48 x 84 in		City of Milwaukee	
	Connect	Riverside Park	2005	Jeremy Wolf	figure	bronze	60 x 38 x 38 in		Urban Ecology Center	
	Fairies Candles	Kilbourn-Kadish Park	2005	Marina Lee		bronze			COA Youth & Family Center	
	Jacques Marquette	Marquette University	2005	Ronald Knepper		bronze	98 x 48 x 78 in		Marquette University	
	Wind Leaves	Discovery World 43°02′13.71″N 87°53′51.46″W	2006	Ned Kahn		aluminum and stainless steel	30 ft		Milwaukee County Department of Parks, Recreation and Culture	
	Edge Elements	South Shore Park	2006	Richard Hansen	landscape	granite			Milwaukee County Department of Parks, Recreation and Culture	
	Walk Like a River	Riverside Park	2006	Peter Flanary	landscape	bronze and granite			Urban Ecology Center	
	Stratiformis	Catalano Square	2006	Jin Soo Kim	abstract	steel			Milwaukee Institute of Art and Design	
	SOARING	Alverno College	2006	Lyle London	abstract	stainless steel	20 ft		Alverno College	
	All in the Air at Once	Department of Public Works Field Headquarters	2006	Richard Taylor		aluminum	18 x 8 x 8 ft		City of Milwaukee	
	Magic Grove	Enderis Playground	2006	Nancy Metz White		painted steel				
	Red Flower Rising	Milwaukee Public Market	2007	Richard Taylor	abstract	painted aluminum	168 x 72 x 72 in			
	Gertie Gets Her Ducks in a Row	Milwaukee Riverwalk at Wisconsin Avenue	2007	Benjamin Rothschild	figure	painted steel			Riverwalk District BID	
	Bronze Fonz	Milwaukee Riverwalk 43°2′25.63″N 87°54′40.10″W	2008	Gerald P. Sawyer	portrait	bronze	65 in		Riverwalk District	portrait of Henry Winkler character, Fonzie
	Quartet	Lincoln Village	2008	Celine Farrell	gateway	steel			Lincoln Avenue BID	
	The Hill Climber	Harley-Davidson Museum 43°01′52.66″N 87°54′56.56″W	2008	Jeff Decker	portrait	bronze	15 ft		Riverwalk District	portrait of motorcyclist
	A Place to Sit	Menomonee Valley 39°52′41″N 86°8′42″W	2009	Kathryn E. Martin	architectural	mixed media	8 x 2 x 2 ft		Friends of the Hank Aaron State Trail	
	Mother Teresa Monument	St. Joan of Arc Chapel, Marquette University	2009	Gautam Pal	portrait	bronze	78 in		Marquette University	
	Uptown Triangles	North, Lisbon & 48th 43.0611°N 87.9738°W	2009	John Adduci	abstract	aluminum	20 x 12 x 10 ft		Uptown Crossing Business Improvement District, BID 16	
	Sea of the Ear	Lincoln Park	2009	Takashi Soga	abstract	steel	168 x 288 x 72 in		Milwaukee County Department of Parks, Recreation and Culture	
	Mixed Feelings	Milwaukee City Hall	2010	Tony Cragg	sculpture	bronze	216 ½ x 92 7/8 x 88 3/16 in		City of Milwaukee	
	Pattern	27th St. and W. Hopkins	2010	Paula Schulze		paint and stain on wood panels				
	Miller Valley Veterans Monument	Miller Brewing Company Visitor Center	2010	Thomas Queoff	monument	bronze	240 in		MillerCoors	
	Selig Monument	Miller Park	2010	Brian Maughan	monument	bronze	84 in			
	Pedestrian Drama	Wisconsin Avenue	2011	Janet Zweig		aluminum, photographic animations, electronics	24 x 24 x 21 in		City of Milwaukee	
	First Flight	Milwaukee Youth Arts Center	2012	Richard Taylor	abstract	aluminum	240 in			
	here, mothers are...	Dominican Center for Women	2012	Adam Carr and Sonja Thomsen		mixed media				
	Uecker Monument	Miller Park	2012	Brian Maughan	monument	bronze	84 in			
	Bridge	Menomonee Valley	2012	Peter Flanary	abstract	stone and stainless steel			State of Wisconsin	
	Pensive	BMO Tower	2013	Radcliffe Bailey	sculpture	bronze, wood	59 x 39 1/4 x 45 1/4 in		Collection Irgens, Milwaukee	
	Big Piney	Saint Kate - The Arts Hotel	2016	Deborah Butterfield	sculpture	cast bronze with patina	93 x 112 x 50 in		Saint Kate - The Arts Hotel	
	Watertower	Walker's Point	2017	Tom Fruin	sculpture	Plexiglas and steel	20 ft x 20 ft		Coakley Brothers Company	
	BAM (Seated Warrior)	America's Black Holocaust Museum	2017	Sanford Biggers	sculpture	polished bronze	78 x 24 x 24 in		America's Black Holocaust Museum	
	Untitled	Historic Third Ward	2017	Michelle Grabner	sculpture	bronze	72 1/2 x 25 1/2 x 4 in		Historic Third Ward Association	
	Shoreline Repast	Catalano Square, Historic Third Ward	2017	Paul Druecke	sculpture	double-sided cast aluminum, paint, steel, cedar, fastening hardware	72 x 78 x 4 in		Green Gallery, Milwaukee	
	Tilted Channel from Full Steam Ahead	Hank Aaron State Trail	2018	Arlene Shechet	sculpture	aluminum, cast iron, glazed firebrick, steel	65 x 96 x 32 in		Friends of Hank Aaron State Trail	
	Cleft from the series Dendroids	Northwestern Mutual Tower and Commons	2018	Roxy Paine	sculpture	stainless steel	37 ft x 45 ft 10 in x 40 ft		The artist and Kasmin Gallery, New York	

== Bibliography ==
- Outdoor Sculpture in Milwaukee: A Cultural and Historical Guidebook by Diane M. Buck and Virginia A. Palmer. Wisconsin Historical Society, 1995.
