= Pangaea (sculpture) =

- Artist: Michaela Mahady
- Year: 1997
- Type: mixed media
- Dimensions: 530 cm × 610 cm × 610 cm (210 in × 240 in × 240 in)
- Location: Lubar School of Business; Milwaukee, Wisconsin; 43.075803°N 87.881801°W
- Owner: University of Wisconsin-Milwaukee

Pangaea is a public art work by artist Michaela Mahady, on the east side of Milwaukee, Wisconsin on the campus of the University of Wisconsin–Milwaukee. The mixed media work incorporates concrete, brick, stone, steel, ceramic tile and colored leaded glass into a pavilion crowned with images of technology. Pangaea represents the global nature of today's world. The artwork is located in a courtyard behind the Sheldon B. Lubar School of Business and was funded by the Wisconsin Arts Board's Percent for Art program.

== See also ==
- Three Bronze Discs
- Milwaukee
- Happy-Go-Luckies of Nature and Technology
- Polyphony
- Jantar-Mantar
- Float
- Lapham Memorial
