= Pangaea (disambiguation) =

Pangaea was a supercontinent of ancient Earth.

Pangaea or Pangea or Pangaia may also refer to:

- Pangaea (album), a 1975 album by Miles Davis
- Pangaea (band), an Australian punk/metal band
- Pangea (cable system), a submarine telecommunications cable system connecting the Netherlands and Denmark to the UK
- PANGAEA (data library), a publisher and archive for data from earth system research
- Pangaea (musician), British electronic musician and DJ
- Pangaea (sculpture), a 1997 public artwork at the University of Wisconsin–Milwaukee
- Pangea Corporation, an animation and toy industry company
- Pangea Day, a 2008 international multimedia event
- Pangea Resources, a company notable for a proposal for an international radioactive waste repository in Australia
- Pangea (restaurant), a Michelin-starred restaurant in Nuevo León, Mexico
- Pangea Recordings, a record label
- Pangea Software, a software company focusing on Apple iOS games
- Pangaea Proxima, a possible future global supercontinent
- Pangaia (company), athleisure fashion brand

== See also ==
- ESA PANGAEA, an astronaut training program
- PangaeaPanga (born 1996), Super Mario World speedrunner and hacker
