= First Flight =

First Flight may refer to:

- Maiden flight, the first flight of a new aircraft type
- First Flight Airport, in North Carolina, United States
- First Flight High School, in Kill Devil Hills, North Carolina
- First Flight (sculpture), a sculpture in Milwaukee, Wisconsin
- First Flight (racehorse), 1940s champion racehorse
- First Flight (medical research horse), source of the first botulinum antitoxin
- First Flight Handicap, a horse race
- First Flight Tournament, a golf tournament in Japan
- First Flight (Star Trek: Enterprise), an episode of the television series
- First Flight (film), an animated short film
- Green Lantern: First Flight
- First Flight (novel), a novel by Chris Claremont
- First Flight: Maiden Voyages in Space and Time, a collection of short-stories
- Magik One: First Flight, a music compilation

It may also refer to:

- The first recorded powered, controlled flight of a heavier-than-air craft
- First solo flight
- First aerial circumnavigation
