= The Spirit of Polonia =

1969 sculpture by Edmund Lewandowski

Spirit of Polonia
- Artist: Edmund Lewandowski
- Year: 1969
- Location: 901 North 9th Street, Milwaukee; 43°2′26.849″N 87°55′25.841″W
- Owner: Milwaukee Art Museum

The Spirit of Polonia, also known as Solidarity, by Edmund Lewandowski, is a sculpture commissioned as part of the fifteenth anniversary of Polanki, the Polish Women's Cultural Club of Milwaukee. Sculpted in 1969, this piece is placed on the south side of the Milwaukee County Courthouse located at 901 North 9th Street in Milwaukee's downtown.

== About ==
The Spirit of Polonia, which is also known as Solidarity, was commissioned in 1968 and was created in Clas Park, across the street from the courthouse. In 1979, the sculpture was moved to the area in front of the courthouse.

This nine foot, five inch stainless steel sculpture has three rings meaning harmony, unity and infinity. The brass sphere represents earth. Each ring is a different size, with one inside the other, with the "globe" being the smallest. The sculpture is surrounded by a sixteen-foot, five inch concrete pool.

Edmund Lewandowski was a Polish American who went to Layton School of Art. He has created sculptures, pursued painting, and commissioned advertising ads.

== Bibliography ==
- Lewandowski, Edmund. Rosyjski Sfinks: Rosjanie Wśród Innych Narodów: Edmund Lewandowski. Warszawa: KiW: 1999.
