= Watertower (Fruin) =

Public art work in Milwaukee, Wisconsin

Coordinates: 43°01′36.6″N 87°54′58.9″W

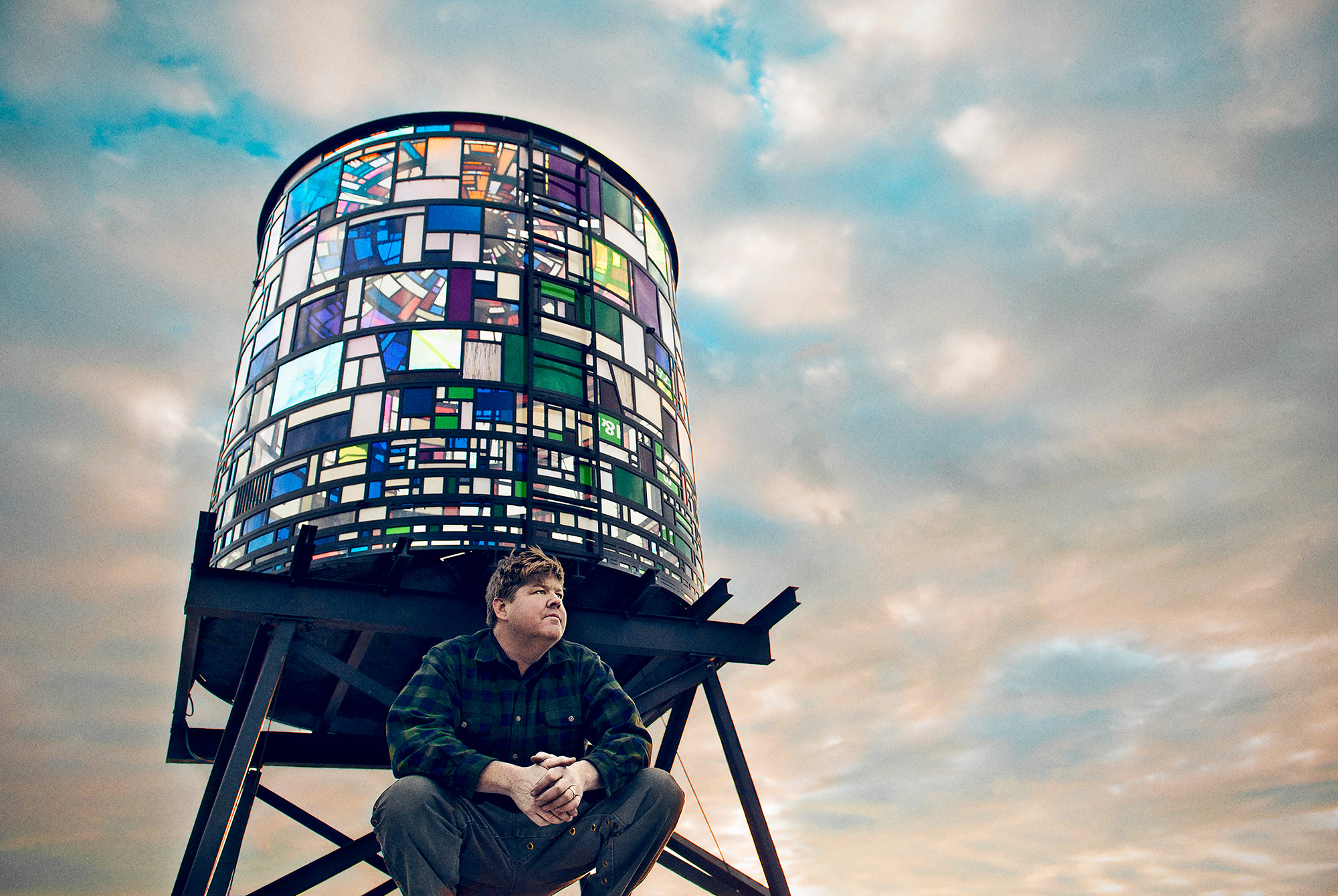
- Artist: Tom Fruin
- Year: 2017
- Type: Plexiglas and steel
- Dimensions: 610 cm × 610 cm (240 in × 240 in)
- Location: Milwaukee, Wisconsin
- Owner: Coakley Brothers Company

Watertower is a public art work by artist Tom Fruin. It is located just south of downtown Milwaukee, Wisconsin on top of the seven-story Coakley Brothers Company warehouse in the Walker's Point neighborhood.

== Description ==
Watertower is a sculpture made of multicolored Plexiglas panels assembled in a frame of welded steel in the form of a water tower. The sculpture's form references the once-common rooftop water tanks, most of which were removed decades ago. Sunlight illuminates the artwork by day, and interior lights make it highly visible at night. Fruin salvages the Plexiglas used in his sculptures.

== Commissioning process ==
Coakley Brothers CEO Peggy Coakley commissioned the artwork for the rooftop of her family business after viewing a similar work by Fruin during a visit to New York. This is the artist's sixth water tower. The artwork is part of a $6 million renovation of the Coakley warehouse. According to a statement by Coakley, her goal with the commission is that "the public will see the sculpture as a symbol of pride for the city's diverse and vibrant citizens and a symbol of how neighborhoods and cities can be progressive and forward-thinking, while still being true to their roots."
