= Mother Teresa Monument =

Public art work by Guatam Pal

Coordinates: 43.037651°N 87.931616°W

- Mother Teresa Monument, 2009
- Location: St. Joan of Arc Chapel, Marquette University, Milwaukee, Wisconsin
- Designer: Gautam Pal
- Material: Bronze
- Height: 78 inches (2,000 mm)
- Opening date: 2009

The Mother Teresa Monument is a public art work by artist Guatam Pal. It is located on the west side of the St. Joan of Arc Chapel on the Marquette University campus in downtown Milwaukee, Wisconsin. The sculpture depicts Mother Teresa dressed in a sari and holding an infant. The sculpture commemorates Mother Teresa's 1981 visit to Marquette, when she was awarded the Pere Marquette Discovery Award. The sculpture was dedicated on October 6, 2009, as part of a weeklong celebration of the "Centennial of Women at Marquette."
