= Statue of Jacques Marquette (Milwaukee, Wisconsin) =

Public art sculpture at Marquette University

Coordinates: 43.036764°N 87.930236°W

- Artist: Ronald Knepper
- Year: 2005
- Type: bronze
- Location: Milwaukee, Wisconsin
- Owner: Marquette University

Jacques Marquette is a public art work by artist Ronald Knepper. It is located on the campus of Marquette University west of downtown Milwaukee, Wisconsin.

== Description ==
Jacques Marquette depicts a bearded, long-haired Marquette dressed in a belted robe. His long cassock cloak trails behind him. In one hand, he holds a map. A crucifix is visible at his belt. The base of the sculpture looks like a jagged rock.

== Location ==
The sculpture is installed in the central interior area of the campus, just east of the St. Joan of Arc Chapel.

== Commissioning process ==
Knepper was commissioned to create the work in May 2004. Funding for the commission was donated by John Madden, an alumnus and member of Marquette's board of trustees, and his wife Mary. Curtis L. Carter, then director of the campus Patrick and Beatrice Haggerty Museum of Art, managed the commission.
