= Topiary Lucere =

Artwork by Steve Feren

- Artist: Steve Feren
- Year: 2001
- Type: concrete, glass, fiber optic
- Dimensions: 430 cm × 670 cm × 1,400 cm (168 in × 264 in × 540 in)
- Location: 648 N Plankinton Ave., Milwaukee, Wisconsin; 43°2′17.19″N 87°54′39.561″W
- Owner: Marriott Hotel

Topiary Lucere is a public art work by American artist Steve Feren located in downtown Milwaukee, Wisconsin, at a Marriott Hotel near the intersection of Plankinton and Wisconsin Avenues. The artwork consists of an array of concrete forms, sculpted boxwood shrub and a dramatically lit centerpiece.

== Description ==
Topiary Lucere's composition is highly symmetrical, playing off the rectangles of glass on the stark facade it enhances. Six low concrete forms resembling chess pieces are set between square evergreen shrubs on either side of a plaza. The low forms are all the same height, but each features a different combination of rounded and angular elements. At the center, a tall concrete pedestal rises like an obelisk and is topped with an abstract textured glass ornament. At night, the glass is illuminated from within by a LED that changes colors as it glows. The obelisk is also lit from below at night, creating a focal point for the garden.
