= Statue of Douglas MacArthur (Milwaukee) =

Artwork by Robert Dean

General Douglas MacArthur
- Artist: Robert L. Dean
- Year: 1979
- Type: sculpture
- Dimensions: 290 cm (114 in)
- Location: Veterans Park, Milwaukee; 43.0426°N 87.8950°W

General Douglas MacArthur is a public artwork by American artist Robert L. Dean, a 1953 graduate of the United States Military Academy (West Point, NY). Previously, the statue was located in MacArthur Square in the Milwaukee Civic Center Plaza, downtown Milwaukee, Wisconsin, USA. On June 7, 2014, it was relocated to its new waterfront location at Veterans' Park, next to the Milwaukee County War Memorial Center. With full military honors, the bronze statue of General Douglas MacArthur was rededicated at its new home on June 7, 2014. The ceremony was the capstone event for the MacArthur Memorial Week, held nearly 35 years after the statue's original dedication on June 8, 1979.

== Description ==
The sculpture features a standing, full-figure portrait of General of the Army Douglas MacArthur, wearing a hat. The general was the top ranking cadet of the 1903 class of USMA. The sculpture, standing on a marble pedestal, depicts MacArthur with his hands are his back pants pockets.

The inscription on the front of the pedestal reads "Douglas MacArthur 1880-1964". The plaque on the back reads "MacARTHUR SQUARE: MacArthur Square was designated on September 17, 1945 to honor General of the Army Douglas MacArthur for his leadership of the Allied forces in the Pacific during World War II. MacArthur, his father General Arthur MacArthur, and his grandfather judge Arthur McArthur, were all residents of Milwaukee. Douglas lived at the Plankinton House and attended West Division High School. In 1898 he was appointed to the U.S. Military Academy by Milwaukee Congressman Theobald Otjen. Douglas MacArthur's final visit here was on April 27, 1951, when he received an honorary degree from Marquette University and spoke at this site."

== Historical information ==
General Douglas MacArthur was sculpted in 1977 over a period of five months in the French town of La Colle-sur-Loup, west of the city of Nice. The sculpture was cast in bronze in Montecatini, Italy.

Dedication of the statue took place June 8, 1979 which was the 80th anniversary of MacArthur's entrance into the United States Military Academy at West Point, after he had been twice rejected prior to his tutoring by a Milwaukee teacher. The dedication was part of a MacArthur Memorial Week from June 8 until June 14, 1979. Mrs. Marie Uihlein donated $50,000 for the sculpture in memory of her husband, Erwin Uihlein, who was a friend and admirer of MacArthur. Supplemental funds were raised by veterans' organizations and private donors.

MacArthur's grandfather, Arthur MacArthur, Sr., came to Milwaukee in 1849. He worked as an attorney and circuit judge and also served as lieutenant governor of Wisconsin. MacArthur's father, Arthur MacArthur, Jr., served in the American Civil War where he was awarded the Medal of Honor for bravery. He also served in the Spanish–American War.
