= SOARING =

Artwork by Lyle London

- Artist: Lyle London
- Year: 2006
- Type: stainless steel
- Dimensions: 610 cm (240 in)
- Location: Milwaukee, Wisconsin; 42.983416°N 87.965554°W
- Owner: Alverno College

SOARING is a public art work by American artist Lyle London, located in Reiman Plaza at Alverno College on the south side of Milwaukee, Wisconsin. The abstract stainless steel sculpture rises 20 feet from a fountain. London's commission was coordinated by Uhlein-Wilson Architects.
