= Miller Valley Veterans Monument =

Public art work by Thomas Queoff

Coordinates: 43°02′32.2″N 87°58′05.9″W

- Artist: Thomas Queoff
- Year: 2010
- Type: bronze
- Dimensions: 610 cm (240 in)
- Location: Milwaukee, Wisconsin
- Owner: MillerCoors

The Miller Valley Veterans Monument is a public art work by artist Thomas Queoff. It is located at the Miller Brewing Company Visitor Center on State Street west of downtown Milwaukee, Wisconsin.

== Description ==
The Miller Valley Monument is a bronze sculpture that depicts a realistic American bald eagle with its wings spread and beak open. The bird stands on top of three beer barrels. In addition to the sculpture, the work recognizes six brewery workers killed in action during World War II on a nearby bronze plaque.

== Dedication ==
The sculpture's dedication took place on November 11, 2010. The ceremony included a performance by the Marquette University ROTC choir, remarks by dignitaries, a 21-gun salute and a flyover by a World War II military plane. Significantly, the brewery suspended production for two hours to facilitate employee participation in the dedication event. Workers who had performed military service were recognized with a gift of a commemorative coin.
