= Uptown Triangles (Adduci) =

Public artwork by John Adduci

- Artist: John Adduci
- Year: 2009
- Dimensions: 610 cm × 370 cm × 300 cm (20 ft × 12 ft × 10 ft)
- Location: North 48th St. and West Libson Ave., Milwaukee; 43°3′38.999″N 87°58′25.553″W

Uptown Triangles is a public artwork by artist John Adduci, located on the corner of N. 48th St. and W. Lisbon Ave. which is in Milwaukee, Wisconsin, USA. The work is a monumental sculpture in the form of intersecting triangles made of aluminum. It is 20 feet tall, 12 feet in width and 10 feet in depth and sits on a concrete foundation. The piece was created in 2009 and is owned by the Uptown Crossing Business Improvement District BID 16.

== Description ==
Chicago native and artist John Adduci's Sculptural creation Uptown Triangles is a monolithic form of intersecting lines and geometry that graces Milwaukee Wisconsin's North West intersection of N. 48th St. and W. Lisbon Ave. in the neighborhood of Uptown Crossing. It is a relatively new addition to Milwaukee having been created in 2009. The sculpture consists of seven large triangular forms of varying size that horizontally intersect two square vertical pillars that cross one another to approximate an "x" form. The triangular shapes curve slightly creating a formal contrast with the straight linear pillars. The entire sculpture is constructed of aluminum and left bare to show the natural silver coloring of the material. The sculptural structure is supported by the two crossing vertical beams which are fastened with large bolts to the concrete base which is a horizontal triangular form. This piece of monumental art stands 20 feet tall and is 12 feet in width and 10 feet wide. Uptown Triangles was commissioned by the Uptown Crossing Business District to add a cultural focal point to the thriving commercial center that is now its home.

== Historical information ==
The Uptown Crossing Business District of Milwaukee Wisconsin's near west side was created in 1995 as a first step in revitalizing and improving the historically commercial area that runs along West North Avenue from N. Sherman Boulevard on the east to N. 60th Street on the west and along West Lisbon Avenue from N. 46th Street to N. 51st Street. In 2007 the Uptown Business District board started accepting proposals for a public art work to enhance the triangular island at the prominent intersection of N. 48th St. and W. Lisbon Ave. After a process of public review the sculptor John Adduci of Chicago was chosen for the commissioned work. John Adduci created the piece off sight and brought it in two pieces to the sight to be installed. It was bolted together and craned into place and secured to the concrete foundation. The artwork was dedicated at a ribbon cutting ceremony on July 21, 2009 which was attended by Milwaukee Mayor Tom Barrett and the artist John Adduci.

== Artist ==
John Adduci is a Chicago born and based structural sculptor born in 1948. Adduci graduated from Southern Illinois University in 1971 with a bachelor's degree in Fine Art and went on to earn a Master's of Fine Art at Arizona State University in 1975. He has since that time worked from his Chicago-based studio fabricating various works of art in aluminum, bronze and steel. Since 1984 he has created many sculptures for public art placement across the United States. Most of Adduci's work is large scale arrangements of abstracted and simplified geometric forms rendered in fabricated metal. Some of his recent works include Prairie Dance, 2009, Bronze, Located in Cary, NC and Whip It, 2009, Bronze, Located in Altona, Manitoba, Canada.

== Location ==
Milwaukee Wisconsin USA at the corner of N.48th St. and W. Lisbon Ave.
