= Gear 23 =

Public artwork by Steven Feren

- Artist: Steven Feren
- Year: 1992
- Type: steel, brass, glass, mosaic
- Dimensions: 240 cm × 280 cm × 110 cm (96 in × 112 in × 43.5 in)
- Location: Fire Engine Company #4; Milwaukee, Wisconsin; 43°7′0.396″N 88°1′53.558″W
- Owner: City of Milwaukee

Gear 23 is a public art work by artist Steven Feren. It is installed at the Milwaukee Fire Department's Engine Company #4 station on the northwest side of Milwaukee, Wisconsin.

== Description ==
Gear 23 presents what appears to be a firefighter's closet. An open framed space made of shiny textured steel includes a top shelf on which four firefighter's helmets are placed. Each helmet displays the name of a firefighter who died in the line of duty. Below the helmets hang four coats on hangers suspended from a brass vertical pole. Below the coats, four sets of boots and trousers rest on a textured steel step. Leaning against the outside of the steps and closet are two coiled fire hoses. The hoses, clothing and helmets are made of colorful mosaic. The entire sculpture rests on a rectangular concrete pad. According to a St. Petersburg Times interview with the artist, "The hanging jackets evoked the image of firefighters waiting for a call. The empty coats seemed to embody the soul of all firefighters, not just the four who died."
