= Peter John (sculpture) =

Artwork by John Raimondi

- Artist: John Raimondi
- Year: June 1978
- Dimensions: 11 m × 7.9 m (36 ft × 26 ft)
- Location: 401 West Michigan Street, Milwaukee; 43°02′14″N 87°54′58″W
- Owner: Blue Cross Blue Shield

Peter John was a sculpture by artist John Raimondi commissioned in 1978. It was located in front of the new Blue Cross Blue Shield building in Milwaukee, Wisconsin. In 2015, during the conversion of the building into apartments, the sculpture disappeared and its whereabouts are unknown.

== Description ==
John Raimondi's artwork was commissioned by Blue Cross Blue Shield for their new building. The sculpture stands 36 feet (11 m) high and 26 feet wide and is made from Cor-Ten painted steel that rests on a red brick foundation. It formerly sat at Blue Cross and Blue Shield United of Wisconsin, on the corner of West Michigan Street and North 4th Street. Its whereabouts are unknown as of 2015 and it has potentially been destroyed.

== Information ==
Massachusetts native and artist John Raimondi’s sculpture, Peter John, is an abstract piece that consists of three triangular forms located in Milwaukee’s downtown. The three triangular forms meet at a central point near the base of the sculpture and jut out from one another as the sculpture is viewed from bottom to top. The sculpture was commissioned in tribute to John Raimondi’s father. A Blue Cross Blue Shield customer, John Whipperfield, commissioned the project from a donation. The total cost of the project was $200,000. This donation led to the groundbreaking of the project in 1978. The plaque on site reads: PETER JOHN/Cor-Ten steel/John Raimondi, Sculptor/Bequest from John Whipperfield/Subscriber to Blue Cross of Wisconsin/and Surgical Care - Blue Shield/June 1978.

== Artist ==
John Raimondi was born in 1948 in Massachusetts and primarily focuses on sculpture and public sculpture. Raimondi attended Portland School of Fine and Applied Arts in Maine though from here he transferred to the Massachusetts College of Art.
