= Narendra Patel =

Kenyan cricketer

Personal information
- Full name: Narendra Patel
- Born: Kenya Colony
- Batting: Left-handed

Career statistics
Competition	First-class
Matches	1
Runs scored	50
Batting average	25.00
100s/50s	–/–
Top score	39
Catches/stumpings	–/–
- Source: Cricinfo, 21 September 2021

Narendra Patel (date of birth unknown) was a Kenyan first-class cricketer.

A Mombasa based cricketer, Patel made a single appearance in first-class cricket for an East African Invitation XI against a touring Marylebone Cricket Club side at Kampala in 1963. Opening the batting twice in the match alongside the Tanzanian R. D. Patel, he was dismissed in East African first innings for 11 runs by Tom Cartwright, while in their second innings he was dismissed for 39 runs by Robin Hobbs.
