= Rainbow Machine =

Artwork by Joseph Burlini

- Artist: Joseph Burlini
- Year: 1993
- Type: kinetic
- Dimensions: 550 cm (216 in)
- Location: Haggerty Museum of Art; Milwaukee, Wisconsin; 43°2′12.171″N 87°55′40.945″W
- Owner: Marquette University

Rainbow Machine is a public art work by American artist Joseph Burlini, located on the campus of Marquette University in downtown Milwaukee, Wisconsin.

== Description ==
The work consists of four tall steel poles affixed with moving holographic arms. Each pole is 12 feet tall and has a six-foot arm on each side that swivels at the center point. The face of each arm is covered with a holographic decal that reflects light, color and motion as the arm moves. The work is oriented toward the Marquette Interchange a short distance from the entrance of the Haggerty Museum of Art.

== History ==
While fabricated in 1993, Rainbow Machine was not installed in Milwaukee until 2000. According to the Haggerty Art Museum, it was previously installed on Michigan Avenue in Chicago.

== Artist ==
Burlini is a graduate of the School of the Art Institute of Chicago and maintains a studio in Arlington Heights, Illinois.
