= Dauntless Guardian =

Artwork by Jeune Nowak Wussow

- Artist: Jeune Nowak Wussow
- Year: 1984
- Type: bronze
- Dimensions: 300 cm (120 in)
- Location: 4141 W Mill Rd., Milwaukee, Wisconsin; 43°8′1.42″N 87°57′53.343″W
- Owner: City of Milwaukee

The Dauntless Guardian is a public art work by American artist Jeune Nowak Wussow, located on the northwest side of Milwaukee, Wisconsin. The bronze figurative sculpture depicts a child being rescued by a firefighter. It is located at 4141 West Mill Road at Milwaukee Fire Department Engine Company #9.

== Description ==
The firefighter is depicted wearing a uniform and helmet. He reaches up with both arms to lift a small child from a windowsill. The child grasps the windowsill with one hand and reaches toward the fireman with the other.

== Historical information ==
Wussow was awarded the commission for Dauntless Guardian after competing unsuccessfully for a previous City of Milwaukee Percent for Art commission opportunity. According to the Milwaukee Journal, Alderman James Kondziella kept Wussow's maquette on his desk at City Hall following the first competition and recommended her when his district was building a new fire station.

Wussow was inspired to create Dauntless Guardian after talking with firefighters about their jobs as she "went from one station house to another."

The sculpture was dedicated on October 8, 1984.
