= Angel in a Cage =

Public artwork by Richard Pflieger

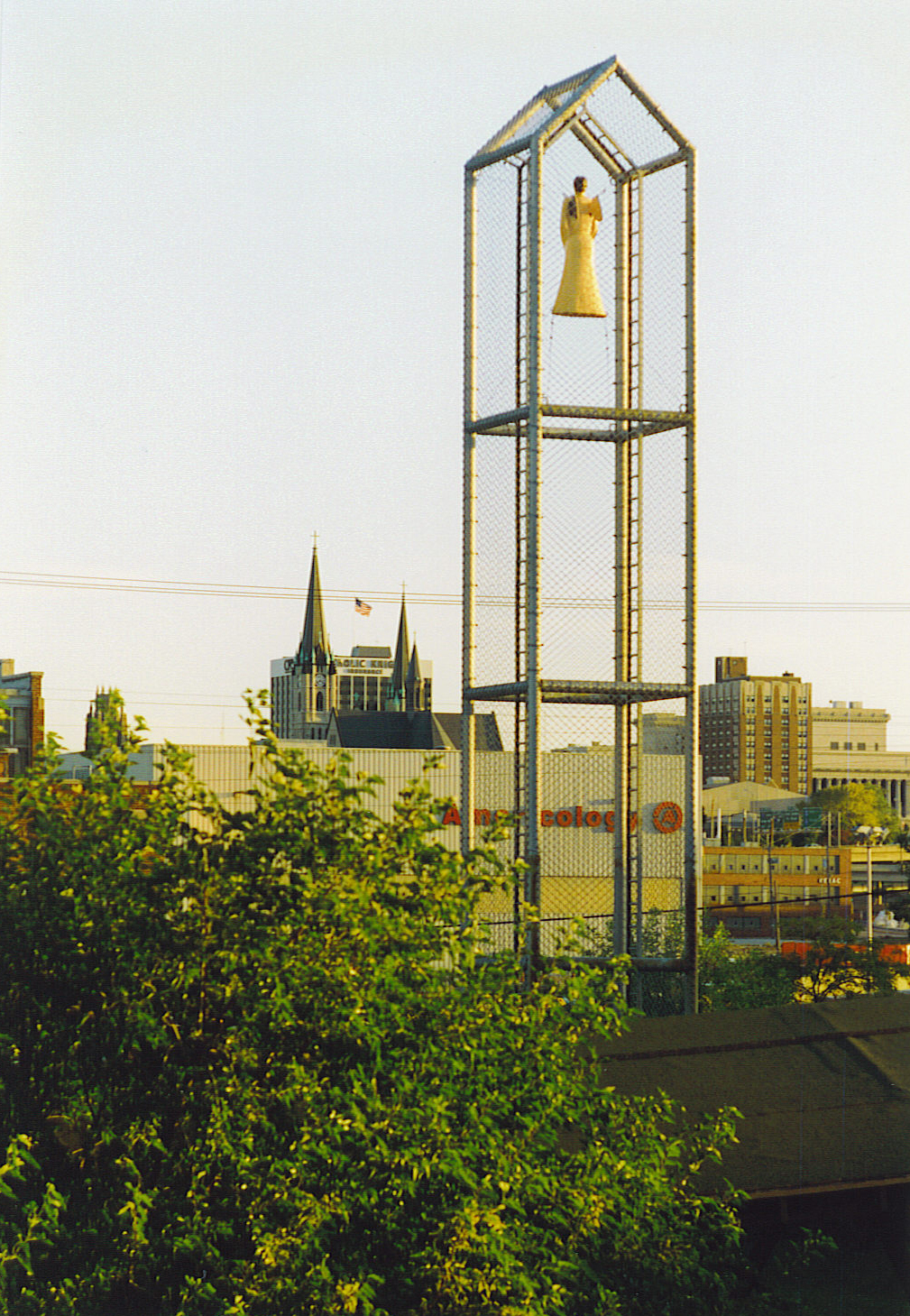
- Artist: Richard Pflieger
- Year: 1983
- Dimensions: 1,200 cm × 160 cm × 160 cm (480 in × 63 in × 63 in)
- Location: 1915 West Canal St., Milwaukee; 43°1′50.85″N 87°55′52.73″W

Angel in a Cage is a public artwork by American artist Richard Pflieger located on Canal Street, which is in Milwaukee, Wisconsin, United States. The public sculpture is made up of a steel tower with an angel suspended inside.

== Description ==
Angel in a Cage, located at the old Emmber Foods plant on Canal Street, consists of a steel tube frame tower encasing a fiberglass angel. There are two metal ladders leaning together within the tower, as well as a fake door with a big lock on one side of the tower's base. The sculpture measures 40 feet in height and was created in 1983.

== Historical information ==
A committee of local expert artists was formed to judge the student sculptures as well as an advisory group of Peck employees to help in deciding the winning design. Richard Pflieger was the winning student with a design called Angel in a Cage, which was a fiberglass angel suspended in a tower of steel fencing. The artist's inspiration came from the many fences throughout the Menomonee Valley in contrast with the numerous shrines with angels in the back yards of the Milwaukee south side homes. The committee suggested the artwork should be forty feet high for the best sculptural impact and biggest statement. Pflieger took almost two years to complete this sculpture which still towers today now in front of Emmber Foods Incorporated on Canal Street in Menomonee Valley.

A structural engineer named Matthew Fuchs of the Milwaukee School of Engineering and fellow student Michael Pagelsdorf advised Pflieger to use 4 ½" steel pipe with ½" wall thickness when building the tower structure. Fence material and even labor were donated by Heritage Fence of Cedarburg. The angel inside the cage is fiberglass and resin which was made from a clay model and has a metal interior. This structure is a great example of cooperative effort of both public education and private business which has the power to create outdoor artwork installations.

== Artist ==
Richard Pflieger graduated with a degree in sculpture from the Milwaukee Institute of Art and Design in 1987. He worked as an industrial designer, a career that has shaped his artwork. Pflieger is interested in studying mood and emotion, as well as in the identity of mass-produced objects. He has been part of a few exhibitions in Milwaukee, including one at the Institute of Visual Arts at the University of Wisconsin–Milwaukee in 2006.
