= Boy with Goose =

1927 sculpture by Girolamo Piccoli

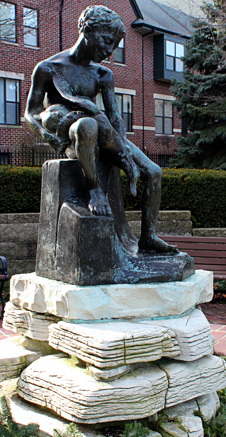
- Artist: Girolamo Piccoli
- Year: 1927
- Dimensions: (43 inches in × 20 inches in × 13 inches in)
- Location: Milwaukee, WI; 43°2′56.909″N 87°54′0.547″W

Boy with Goose, is a public artwork by Italian artist Girolamo Piccoli, currently in storage in Milwaukee, Wisconsin, United States.

== Description ==
The work is cast bronze 3 feet 7 inches (109 cm) high x 1 foot 8 inches (51 cm) wide x 1 foot 1 inch (33 cm) deep. A small naked boy sits holding a pet goose in his lap. The boy holds the goose's head in his proper left hand. Water for the fountain comes from the bird's open beak. The sculpture is mounted on an irregularly shaped, tiered base and set in a planter.

== Historical information ==
In 1925 Andrew A. McCabe, a local resident, commissioned the original Boy with Goose as a fountain for his home on North Lake Drive. According to a newspaper account, the real-life model for the figure was Dominic Joseph Balestrieri, who later became a city of Milwaukee fireman who died in 1961. Other citizens liked the work so much they raised $800 to have a replica cast in Bremen, Germany, and placed in Lake Park in 1927, north of the streetcar depot. The fountain charmed visitors to the park until 1964 when vandalism to the base caused park officials to remove it and place the bronze in storage.

=== Location history ===
When the Mandel Group, developers of East Point Commons, announced plans for multi-family housing to be located on nine blocks of the abandoned Park East freeway corridor, the City of Milwaukee dedicated part of the land to become a small public park to be maintained by the owners. An art advocacy citizens' group, Art Action, saw this development as an opportunity to retrieve the Boy with Goose bronze, which had languished in county storage for many years. Art Action coordinated the cooperation between the private sector, the city, and the county to find the work and subsequently have the bronze restored, re-patinated, and sited in its present location.

== Artist ==
The artist, Girolamo Piccoli, was born in Palermo, Italy in 1902. Brought to Milwaukee by his parents at the age of four, he later studied at the Wisconsin School of Art in Madison, and with Frank Vittor (1888–1968) in Pittsburgh (1921–1922), and Lorado Taft in Chicago (1923). Piccoli began teaching at the Layton School of Art in 1924 and became chair of the modeling (sculpture) department a year later.

From 1924 to 1928 the sculptor won several awards for his work from the Milwaukee Art Institute and completed many private commissions. Piccoli left Layton in 1928 for New York City, where he opened a studio with his wife, also an artist. In the 1930s he was named Director of Sculpture for New York City under the Federal Art Program of the Great Depression.
