= Stratiformis (sculpture) =

Artwork by Jin Soo Kim in Wisconsin, US

Coordinates: 43°1′51.67″N 87°54′25.15″W

- Artist: Jin Soo Kim
- Year: 2006
- Type: mixed media

Stratiformis is a public artwork by Korean-born artist Jin Soo Kim located in Catalano Square, which is south of downtown in the Historic Third Ward of Milwaukee, Wisconsin, United States. The large sculpture combines disassembled knitting machines culled from a local apparel manufacturer in a grid of rusted rebar, all hand-wrapped with galvanized and copper wire. It was installed in 2006.

== Description ==
Stratiformis is responding to the local labor history of the Historic Third Ward. Reliable Knitting Works was a knitting company that created wool hats, gloves and hockey stockings. It was the last company to create these goods in the United States. The company and its president, Isabelle Polacheck, were instrumental in creating the characteristics of the Historic Third Ward, as we know it today. It was once at risk of becoming a red light district. Polacheck's company donated old knitting machines for this project.

Hand labor is a key theme in Stratiformis. The salvaged knitting machines bear traces of wear by their operators, and the artist left bits of stray yarn and thread connected to some of the machine parts to evoke a sense of warmth associated with knit goods. The steel is hand-welded to assure longevity. The galvanized and copper wires were hand-wrapped and then hand-filed. A sealant is applied by hand at regular intervals to prevent excessive rust. Stratiformis is related to Kim's larger body of work, which references memory, cultural identity, and healing.

== Commissioning process ==
The project was commissioned through the Open Art Project, an effort developed in 2004 and led by the Milwaukee Institute of Art and Design (MIAD). In the belief that “dialogue and discussion beforehand will improve both the art and its impact," the Open Art Project invited three artists--Kinji Akagawa, Luis Jiménez, and Jin Soo Kim—to present their work in a series of public forums.

The Open Art Project's commission framework emphasized participatory process and public input, features increasingly common in public art commissioning activity due to episodes like Tilted Arc and the regularity of public art controversy. The design of the Open Art Project's commissioning framework was also shaped in direct response to a then-recent Milwaukee public art debacle: Dennis Oppenheim’s Blue Shirt. Milwaukee County’s cancellation of Blue Shirt, which had been scheduled for installation at Mitchell International Airport in 2003, was a source of civic embarrassment for local public art advocates. By early 2003, Milwaukee Journal Sentinel art writer Jim Auer summarized the “lessons learned” from Blue Shirt and published his blueprint for future public art processes: 1) notify the media early, 2) create venues for citizen input on finalists, and 3) invite publics to meet with artists before plans are finalized. The Open Art Project, in positioning itself as a remedy and a new start for local public art, heeded Auer's advice and layered process with dialogue to create broader public participation.

Following public presentations and dialogue, the Open Art Project commission was ultimately awarded to Kim, a member of the sculpture faculty at the School of the Art Institute of Chicago. Kim had begun to shift her practice toward public work in 2003, completing commissions in Pusan, Korea and Stevens Point, Wisconsin.

== Installation ==
To create Stratiformis, Kim led processes related to research, fabrication, and installation. She took up residence and a studio in Milwaukee and collaborated extensively. Students from MIAD assisted with research on the local community and area businesses of the present and past. They also worked with Kim in the studio. According to Kim, the collaboration of MIAD students as an “integral part of the original process." During the weeks prior to the dedication, Kim and several students moved their studio practice out to the sculpture's site. According to Kim, “People were puzzled and fascinated that it was literally being tied together by hand." The sculpture was dedicated on May 3, 2006.

== Critical response ==
Critics had previously praised Kim's “oddly affecting assemblages," “painstaking approach, which emulates the activity of bandaging or sewing," and her installations “dense as a tropical forest." But response by the Milwaukee art press to Stratiformis has not been positive. Local art critics have derided the sculpture as a “jerry-rigged contraption," a “brown smudge," and “Stratiformless."
