= Vliet Street Commons =

Public art work in Wisconsin, US

Coordinates: 43°02′55.6″N 87°58′33.9″W

- Artist: Jill Sebastian
- Year: 2000
- Type: concrete and steel
- Location: Milwaukee, Wisconsin

Vliet Street Commons is a public art work by American artist Jill Sebastian, located on the west side of Milwaukee, Wisconsin near 50th and Vliet Streets. The work was created as part of a revitalization effort.

== Description ==
Vliet Street Commons is a site-specific artwork made of concrete and steel. It incorporates a large table with bench seating and umbrella sun shade, a rounded arbor with elevated walkway, a birdbath, a reading desk, a stage and a grove of trees.

Sebastian collaborated with representatives from the West End Vliet Street Business Association, Martin Drive Neighborhood Association, Washington Heights Neighborhood Association and Rainbow Heights Association to create "something that would bring people together."

== Location history ==
The work is located at Wick Field, a city-owned recreation site. Vliet Street Commons is tucked between baseball diamonds and tennis courts. According to Milwaukee Journal Sentinel architecture critic Whitney Gould, the work is "a marriage of functional sculpture and landscape design."

In 2011, Vliet Street Commons served as a site for a temporary mural by Harvey Opgenorth. The mural was sponsored by In:Site, a temporary public art organization. When In:Site approached Sebastian for permission to install the mural, she replied, "From the outset, I envisioned it as a backdrop for other artists to use as a framework. The project was about creating a living place that could be part of people's lives."

== Funding ==
The project was supported with a $5,000 planning grant from the Milwaukee Arts Board. According to Sebastian, the remaining construction budget of $120,000 was raised "by the community through car washes, wine tastings, art auctions, door to door soliciting and appeal to local companies."
