= Oops, Missed =

Public artwork by Bernard Peck

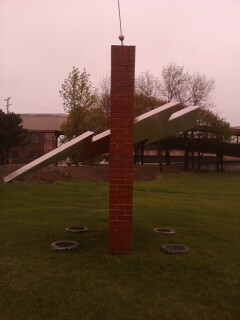
- Artist: Bernard Peck (b. 1927)
- Year: 1987
- Dimensions: 300 cm × 150 cm (10 ft × 5 ft)
- Location: 1515 West Canal St., Milwaukee; 43°1′52.042″N 87°55′52.362″W

Oops, Missed is a public artwork by American Bernard Peck located at 1515 West Canal Street, just off the 16th street viaduct, in Milwaukee, Wisconsin, United States. It was dedicated in July 1987. It is made of brick and stainless steel.

== Historical information ==
The sculpture is located in Menomonee Valley. which at one time was home to white settlers who lived off fish and waterfowl from the Milwaukee water systems. Docks were built along the Great Lakes for shipping. Tanneries, slaughterhouses, and coal yards were moved west of 27th Street in the valley. This was done to keep all businesses in a central location, out of city limits.

== Artist ==
Bernard Peck, at the time of the completed sculpture was vice president of Peck Meat Packing company. During this time he became friends with sculptors Joseph Mendla and Hilary Goldblatt. Friends of Mr. Peck think the sculpture is a self-portrait.
