= Sharing the Load =

Outdoor sculpture by Dan Leonhardt in Milwaukee, Wisconsin

- Artist: Dan Leonhardt
- Year: 1996
- Type: mixed media
- Location: Milwaukee, Wisconsin; 43.070955°N 87.900783°W

Sharing The Load is a public artwork by American artist Dan Leonhardt, located at Garden Park in the Riverwest neighborhood in Milwaukee, Wisconsin, United States. The sculpture is made of steel and stone and was installed by the artist in 1996.

== Description ==
Sharing The Load consists of two large symmetrical steel sections that are welded together at the base. A thick chain joins the sections together. The chain is also woven around two rocks. The steel sections appear to be holding the rocks up. An inscription that reads "SHARING THE LOAD" is welded on in all capital letters. The steel is the color of rust. The chain is a dark grey. The rocks are tan and beige.

== Artist ==
Dan Leonhardt earned his B.F.A. at Illinois Wesleyan University in 1993. He then earned his M.F.A. from the University of Wisconsin-Milwaukee in 1996.
