= Edge Elements =

Public sculpture by Richard Hansen

- Artist: Richard Hansen (artist)
- Year: 2006
- Type: Wisconsin red granite
- Location: South Shore Park; Milwaukee, Wisconsin; 42°59′36.6″N 87°52′48.1″W
- Owner: Milwaukee County

Edge Elements is a public sculpture by Richard Hansen located at South Shore Park on the south side of Milwaukee, Wisconsin. Edge Elements is a series of five sculptures, commissioned by the Milwaukee County Percent for Art Program.

== Description ==
Each sculpture is made of several large pieces of Wisconsin red granite arranged in a different formation. Several sculptures also incorporate carved elements made of white granite. The forms of the individual sculpture all offer seating and views of Lake Michigan. Each sculpture is set on a square bed of crushed stone.

== Historical information ==
Funds for Edge Elements were made available during the five-year redevelopment of South Shore Park, which included improvements to its bike path, breakwater, and shoreline. The budget for the artwork was $110,000.

In June 2007, the South Shore Park Watch offered a tour of the artworks as part of an area-wide celebration of the 100th anniversary of the Milwaukee County Parks System. In 2008, Edge Elements was selected by Jodi Pinto and Ted Landsmark for recognition by the Americans for the Arts Public Art Network as an outstanding project in its "Year in Review."

== See also ==
- Environmental art
