= Buildings 1992 =

Artwork by Susan Walsh

- Artist: Susan Walsh (artist)
- Year: 1992
- Type: stainless steel
- Location: 10320 West Fond du Lac Avenue, Milwaukee, Wisconsin; 43°8′24.72″N 88°2′25.26″W
- Owner: City of Milwaukee

Buildings 1992 is a public art work by American artist Susan Walsh, located on the northwest side of Milwaukee, Wisconsin. The architectural sculpture was created for the Milwaukee Fire Department station at the intersection of 103rd Street and Fond du Lac Avenue.

== Description ==
Buildings 1992 depicts the frames of four tall, rectangular buildings. Each building has two doors at its base. Two of the buildings have triangular roofs. One has an arched roof. The entire work rests on a square concrete base.
