= Cleopatra's Wedge =

Artwork by Beverly Pepper

- Artist: Beverly Pepper
- Year: 1991
- Type: Public Art, Sculpture
- Dimensions: 550 cm (216 in)
- Location: Burns Commons, Milwaukee; 43°2′51.159″N 87°53′46.783″W

Cleopatra's Wedge is an 18-foot-tall (5.5 m) carbon steel sculpture currently on display at the Burns Commons in Milwaukee, Wisconsin. It is part of a growing roster of public art found within the city.

== Description ==
Created in 1991 by Brooklyn born artist Beverly Pepper and carved from an abandoned freeway corridor, the piece has been described by the Milwaukee Journal Sentinel as "slicing into the sky like a tool left behind by Paul Bunyan." It is made from Cor-ten, a favorite among outdoor artists, which naturally oxidizes while maintaining a deep rustlike appearance.

Cleopatra's Wedge came to Milwaukee by way of Chicago's Navy Pier. Before that it was exhibited in New York's Battery Park, Florence, Paris, and other places around the world.

Barry Mandel, a developer who created the surrounding apartment buildings, has an option to purchase the piece for $225,000. He hopes it will become the centerpiece of a new sculpture garden at the Burns Commons that would include a number of smaller works from recognized artists.

The park itself was part of a land swap with the City of Milwaukee to expand available green space. It was dedicated to poet Robert Burns in 1909 by Mayor David Rose, and has been called the First Ward Triangle, Franklin Square, and Baby's Park. During the 1900s, nannies for many of the wealthy Terrace Avenue families would sit with their newborn charges at the triangle.
