= Engine Company No. 10 (Casper) =

Public sculpture in Wisconsin

- Artist: Michael Casper
- Year: 1990
- Type: bronze
- Dimensions: 141.6 cm × 110 cm × 110 cm (55.75 in × 43 in × 45 in)
- Location: Milwaukee; 43.032165°N 87.906885°W

Engine Company No. 10, is a public artwork by artist Michael Casper, commissioned by Thomas M. Wamser located in the Historic Third Ward on Broadway Street, in Milwaukee, Wisconsin, United States. The structure is made out of bronze and was installed in 1990.

== Description ==
Engine Company No. 10 is a statue of a firefighter sitting on a bench with his dog. The statue shows a firefighter and his dog at rest. It sits in front the historic Fire Dept. Engine Co. #10 on Broadway Street in the Historic Third Ward, Milwaukee. The Third Ward is an arts district in Milwaukee that contains a theater and many galleries. Each month a gallery night is held to showcase all of the Third Ward's artistic qualities.
