= Tip (sculpture) =

Artwork by David Middlebrook

- Artist: David Middlebrook
- Year: 2004
- Type: bronze, basalt and marble
- Dimensions: 1,200 cm × 610 cm (480 in × 240 in)
- Location: Gordon Park; Milwaukee, Wisconsin; 43.070842°N 87.897327°W
- Owner: Milwaukee County

Tip is a public art work by American artist David Middlebrook, located in the Riverwest neighborhood north of downtown Milwaukee, Wisconsin. The sculpture was created for Gordon Park as part of a revitalization initiative.

== Description ==
Serving as an entrance arch at the northwest corner of the park, Tip stands on either side of an asphalt path. The work has three primary elements: a thumbprint-stamped basalt column, a sky-slicing net of iconic symbols cast in bronze, and a carved white Italian marble iceberg topped with a large anvil and delicate tree branch. The work's imagery invites viewers "into a dream-like narrative dealing with the geological and cultural history of the location."
