= Ribbons VI =

Public sculpture in Wisconsin

- Artist: Stephen Fischer
- Year: 1989
- Type: steel
- Location: Milwaukee, Wisconsin

Ribbons VI is a public art work by artist Stephen Fischer. It was installed in the Menomonee Valley in downtown Milwaukee, Wisconsin in 1989.

== Description ==
The sculpture has an abstract form that combines an open circle and a squiggle forged in Cor-ten steel. The circle rests directly on the ground, and the squiggle rises from its top, reaching out vertically and slightly diagonally. The fabrication style is consistent with other works by the artist.
