= On Watch =

Public sculpture in Wisconsin

- Artist: David M. Wanner
- Year: 1990
- Dimensions: 190 cm × 170 cm × 86 cm (74 in × 65 in × 34 in)
- Location: 6680 North Teutonia, Milwaukee; 43°8′18.825″N 87°57′13.209″W
- Owner: Administered by the City of Milwaukee

On Watch is a public artwork by American artist David M. Wanner located at the Fire and Police Safety Academy, which is in Milwaukee, Wisconsin, United States. The life-size bronze sculpture depicts a police officer and a fire fighter both holding a rescued child. Created in 1990, the work was commissioned through Milwaukee's Percent for Art program.

== Description ==
On Watch is a life-size bronze sculpture consisting of three figures. A Caucasian policeman and an African-American firefighter stand back-to-back holding a child wrapped in a blanket. The inscription on the southwest corner of the sculpture reads: WANNER 90. The inscription on the northwest corner reads: WACO FDR. There is a bronze plaque on the concrete base which reads: On Watch/ Dedicated to the guardians of public safety in the city of Milwaukee John Norquist, mayor Milwaukee Art Commission, David M. Wanner Sculptor 1990. The work is administered by the City of Milwaukee.

== Historical information ==
In 1972-73 the city of Milwaukee converted Madonna High School into a modern training academy for the city's policemen and firemen. The new building qualified for Milwaukee's Percent for Art program, therefore two competitions were held by the Milwaukee Arts Commission to choose a sculpture for the site. After the first competition's results were announced, the artists involved complained of changes in guidelines and favoritism. A second competition was thus held. David M. Wanner won the second competition and the $33,000 commission.

The three bronze figures were cast in thirteen pieces and then welded together. They were set on concrete foundations, which go 4 1/2 ft. underground. "Wanner wanted to subtly represent the fire fighter as a black minority- either a man or woman; however, the bronze casting by a local industrial foundry blurred the desired nuance."

== Artist ==
David M. Wanner was a Catholic priest as a young man and participated in the civil rights movement. He received a PhD in Fine Arts and Sculpture in 1976 from the Union Institute in Cincinnati, and an MA in Systematic Technology in 1973 from Marquette University in Milwaukee. He has worked in sculpture and design since 1968. Wanner founded Wanner Sculpture Studio in 1970 in Milwaukee, where he works with his son Jordan Wanner. The sculptor is inspired by his faith as well as the work of other artists. "The sculptural style of David and Jordan is rooted in the contemporary European tradition of sculpture, as exemplified in the works of Meštrović, Bourdelli, Rodin, Barlach, Kolbe, Marcks, and others." He currently works on both private commissions and ecclesiastical sculptures.
