= Polyphony (Weiner) =

Artwork by Egon Weiner

- Artist: Egon Weiner
- Year: 1963
- Type: Bronze
- Dimensions: 320 cm × 320 cm × 160 cm (125 in × 125 in × 64 in)
- Location: Milwaukee; 43.074956°N 87.882561°W
- Owner: University of Wisconsin–Milwaukee

Polyphony is a public artwork by Austrian artist Egon Weiner located on the University of Wisconsin–Milwaukee campus, which is in Milwaukee, Wisconsin, United States.

== Description ==
This sculpture is one of two Polyphony sculptures made by Egon Weiner; Polyphony is a much larger version of Polyphony II. These bronze sculptures are made up of geometric shapes. Long poles and large triangles are intertwined in a maze-like piece coming from a central area in the base. Weiner ultimately created Polyphony to symbolize the rhythm and motion of a conductor’s baton as he directed his orchestra. The inscriptions on the sculpture are as follows: POLYPHONY BY EGON WEINER 1963 on the northeast corner of the circular platform and KRIA.KUNST & METALSTOBERI-OSLO-NORWAY on the southwest corner of bronze platform.

== Historical information ==
When the Fine Arts- Music building was completed in 1962 on the University of Wisconsin–Milwaukee campus, sculptor Egon Weiner spent the summer session there as artist-in-residence. Arrangements were made with the university to place a piece of his work on the campus. Throughout the summer of 1963, Weiner sculpted Polyphony in plaster-of-paris, and then cast the sculpture in bronze. During the work’s dedication ceremonies, Weiner stated that the sculpture represents “the rhythm of music and its inner structure.”

=== Location history ===
Originally the sculpture was placed at the west entrance to the music building, but years later the sculpture was moved due to the growing number of students on campus. The Fine Arts-Music building needed additions for the art department and an auditorium therefore Polyphony was moved into storage. After the construction was finished Polyphony was moved to a grassy knoll at the corner of East Kenwood Boulevard and North Maryland Avenue, next to the Student Union; before returning to the Arts Center Complex in 2023. The sculpture is currently located adjacent to the Arts Centre Lecture Hall.

== Artist ==
Born in 1906 and died on August 1, 1987. He was an Austrian sculptor and professor. Weiner taught at the School of the Art Institute of Chicago from 1945 to 1971. He is widely known for his 33 foot abstract bronze sculpture Pillar of Fire, which can be found on the grounds of the Chicago Fire Academy, symbolizing the Great Chicago Fire of 1871. Weiner lectured and exhibited widely. He created hundreds of public and private commissions, and received many awards and honors.
