= Statue of Casimir Pulaski (Milwaukee) =

Public artwork by Joseph Kiselewski

Count Casimir Pulaski
- Artist: Joseph Kiselewski
- Year: 1931
- Type: bronze on granite pedestal
- Dimensions: (72 on a 204 pedestal in)
- Location: Milwaukee; 42°59′56.95″N 87°56′02.74″W

Count Casimir Pulaski is a public artwork by American artist Joseph Kiselewski located in Pulaski Park, which is in Milwaukee, Wisconsin, United States. The bronze statue is a 6-foot, full-length portrait of Count Casimir Pulaski standing atop a 17-foot granite pedestal.

== Description ==
Count Casimir Pulaski consists of a cast bronze full-length portrait of the count dressed in uniform and unsheathing a sword from his proper left side. The sculpture is covered in a blue-green patina and stands on a white cut granite base. There are various inscriptions on the statue and its base. The proper left side of the bronze base reads: J. Kisielewski (sic). One side of the stone base reads: To the memory of Gen. Casimir Pulaski made glorious by his life and death 1746 1779. Another side reads: Erected- 1931. The third side reads: Pulaski. The fourth side of the stone base reads: Na. Wieczna. Parniec. Iczesc. Naszego. Rodaka Kazimierza. Pulaskiego Pulacy. W. Milwaukee. The sculpture is administered by the Milwaukee County, Department of Parks, Recreation and Culture.

== Historical information ==
Pulaski was born in Warsaw, Poland, on March 6, 1745. He fought with his father against the Russian and Prussian influence over Poland. When their efforts failed, Pulaski was outlawed by the Russians for his actions. He met Benjamin Franklin in Paris and was enthralled by the idea of a new country fighting for its freedom, offering his services to help America in the battle. Franklin wrote Pulaski a letter of introduction to General George Washington, and Pulaski sailed to America, arriving in Philadelphia in 1777. He distinguished himself as a brilliant military technician, prompting Congress to put him as the head of the newly established Cavalry. Pulaski thus became known as the Father of the American Cavalry. "It was on October 9, 1779 during the Battle of Savannah, that General Pulaski, charging into battle on horseback, fell to the ground mortally wounded by the blast of a cannon. Pulaski's enemies were so impressed by his courage that they spared him the musket and permitted him to be carried from the battlefield." He died on October 15, 1779.

In Milwaukee, the Polish Army Veterans Post No. 3 decided to recognize Pulaski's 150th anniversary. The Polish-language newspaper and 10 Polish-American civic organizations contributed to the funds needed for the sculpture. Although an equestrian statue would have been more appropriate to honor Pulaski, the Great Depression prevented the Veterans from raising more than $12,000. This amount was perfect for a full-length figure of the general. The board of directors of the Pulaski Monument Association proceeded to choose Kiselewski's model of the statue that stands today.
