= Sea of the Ear =

Artwork by Takashi Soga

- Artist: Takashi Soga
- Year: 2009
- Type: steel
- Dimensions: 430 cm × 730 cm × 180 cm (168 in × 288 in × 72 in)
- Location: Lincoln Park; Milwaukee, Wisconsin; 43°6′18.581″N 87°55′39.312″W
- Owner: Milwaukee County

Sea of the Ear is a public sculpture by Takashi Soga located in Lincoln Park on the north side of Milwaukee, Wisconsin. Sea of the Ear - Floating Cylinder is a kinetic work made of galvanized steel and painted bright red. The artwork was commissioned by the Milwaukee County Percent for Art Program.
