= Lapham Memorial =

Public artwork by Albert H. Atkins

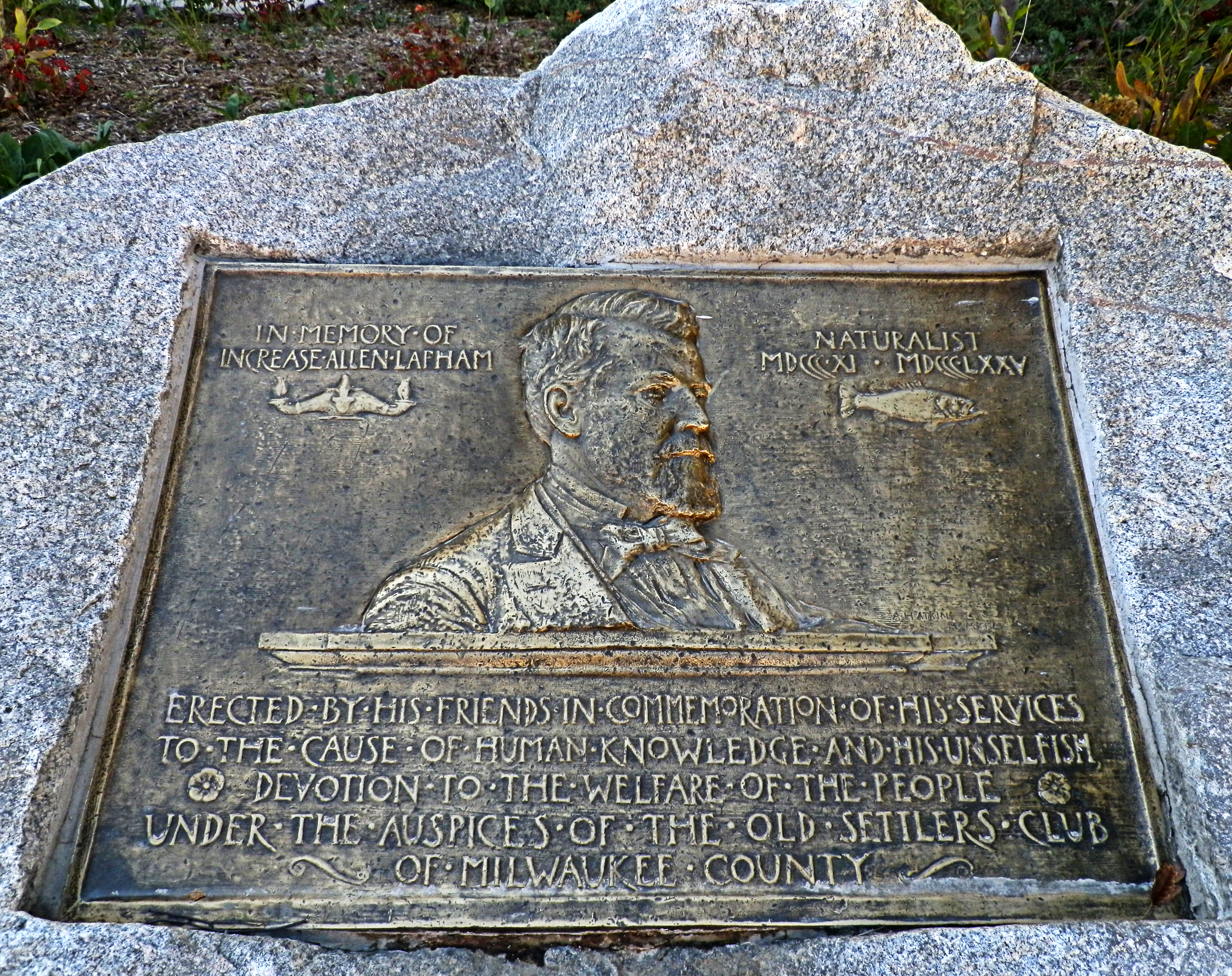
- Artist: Albert H. Atkins
- Year: 1915
- Type: tablet sculpture; plaque on boulder
- Dimensions: 70 cm × 94 cm (27.5 in × 37 in); 7 feet in diameter
- Location: Milwaukee; 43°04′33.5″N 87°52′58.9″W

The Lapham Memorial is a public artwork by American artist Albert H. Atkins, located near the entrance to Lapham Hall, on the University of Wisconsin–Milwaukee campus. It is in memory of Increase A. Lapham, a 19th-century scientist famous for prompting the creation of the National Weather Service and recording the antiquities of Wisconsin, among other accomplishments.

== Description ==
The relief plaque is made out of bronze and is mounted on a granite base. The plaque is approximately 27.5 inches by 37 inches and the base is approximately 50 inches by 82 inches by 82 inches, weighing 40,000 pounds. The plaque is in a landscape format featuring the bust of Increase A. Lapham in the center. The male figure has a mustache and a beard, and is wearing a high collared shirt, a bow tie, and jacket. To the upper left there is an oil lamp, which represents Lapham's contribution to learning in Wisconsin. It is inscribed: "In memory of Increase Allen Lapham." There is a fish on the plaque's upper right representing his interest in the fresh water lakes and natural resources of Wisconsin. It is inscribed: "Naturalist MDCCC.XI . MDCCC.LXXV." The words inscribed below the portrait are as follows: "Erected by his friends in commemoration of his services to the cause of human knowledge and his unselfish devotion to the welfare of the people. Under the auspices of the old settlers club of Milwaukee County."

== Historical information ==
Lapham was a member of the Old Settlers' Club of Milwaukee. The club commissioned the plaque.

=== Location history ===
It was originally installed at an entrance to Lapham Park on 8th Street in Milwaukee. This was where Lapham had surveyed an Indian mound. The city began a housing project on this site in the 1960s and the plaque was moved to a drive leading to Lapham Hall on the University of Wisconsin–Milwaukee campus. It was later moved in front of Lapham Hall along North Maryland Avenue for better visibility.

== Artist ==
The artist who created this plaque was Albert Henry Atkins. He was an American sculptor born in 1880 in Milwaukee. He died in 1951. Atkins both lived and was an active artist in Massachusetts and Rhode Island. He was well known for his monuments and portraits in sculpture. This work is the only example of his sculpture in a public place in the city of his birth.

== Condition ==
In May 1993, Save Outdoor Sculpture! surveyed and noted it needed treatment.

== Other memorial ==
Another memorial tablet in honor of Increase A. Lapham is at Lapham Peak in Waukesha county. It was unveiled in 1917.

== See also ==
- List of public art in Milwaukee

== Sources ==
- Lapham, S. G. Honors a Distinguished Scientist, Americana, American Historical Magazine, (Dec.) 1915, v. 10, pp. 1050–1052. (copy)
- Bruce, W. G. Increase A. Lapham, History of Milwaukee, City and County, 1922, v. 1, pp. 123–126. (copy)
