= Menomonee (sculpture) =

Artwork by Hilary Goldblatt

- Artist: Hilary Goldblatt
- Year: 1985
- Dimensions: 137 cm × 120 cm × 610 cm (4 ft 6 in × 4 ft × 20 ft)
- Location: W. Canal St. and S. Emmber Ln., Milwaukee; 43°1′52.028″N 87°55′54.299″W

Menomonee is a public artwork by artist Hilary Goldblatt located on the former Emmber Foods, Inc. grounds on the south side of Milwaukee, Wisconsin, United States. The Cor-Ten steel piece is a horizontal constructivist abstract form composed of beams forming angles and open spaces. It was created in 1985 and is 4.5 ft high, 20 ft long and 4 ft wide.

== Description ==
Menomonee is a Cor-Ten steel horizontal sculpture made up of beams welded at various angles. It sits on a concrete base with a plaque that reads "Menomonee/by Hilary Goldblatt/sponsored By/peck Meat Packing Corp." The plaque was installed on October 4, 1985, and is unsigned. Goldblatt thought carefully about the Menomonee Valley when conceptualizing this site-specific sculpture. She came up with a balanced abstract form that is both open and enclosed, offering the viewer various angles from which it can be appreciated.

== Information ==
Once Hilary Goldblatt conceptualized Menomonee she built a maquette and created the full-scale work at Hartbronze, Inc., a foundry that she co-founded. The sculpture's ultimate abstract form reflects its meaning. "In a 1986 exhibition at the David Barnett Gallery, the artist said: '...Ideally the work should speak for itself. I am more interested in discovering my philosophy during the process of working. My discoveries, thoughts and statements are recorded in the work. Making sculpture is an instrument that I have used for learning to get at truths which also have a universality that others might sense." Goldblatt gave the work, which was originally located at the Peck Meat Packing Corp., to Bernie Peck in appreciation for his support.

== Artist ==
Hilary Goldblatt was born in London in 1945, and grew up in Cape Town, South Africa. She moved to Milwaukee in the 1970s and enrolled at the Milwaukee Institute of Art & Design. Goldblatt graduated in 1980 with a Bachelor of Fine Arts in sculpture and a minor in printmaking. After graduating, the artist and her husband built a bronze foundry, which was first located at a Peck Foods building and later in the P & V Atlas Warehouse. It was during this period that Goldblatt became adept at welding and began to create constructivist works.

The artist believes that living in different locations around the world has provided her with the opportunity to examine the richness of diverse cultures. She is interested in the nature of reality, the environment, and a lost kinship with nature. Her works espouse ideas of concealment and containment, which she believes are universal themes.

Goldblatt has had many exhibitions in Wisconsin and has been commissioned to create works around the world. She is co-founder of Hartbronze, Inc., Porcupine Magazine, and Mazur Goldblatt Design.
