= Cass Street Park =

Public art work by Marina Lee

- Artist: Marina Lee (artist)
- Year: 1998
- Type: fiberglass
- Dimensions: 490 cm × 150 cm × 490 cm (192 in × 60 in × 192 in)
- Location: Milwaukee, Wisconsin; 43.050709°N 87.90194°W

Cass Street Park is a public art work by American artist Marina Lee, located on the east side of Milwaukee, Wisconsin at 1647 N. Cass St. The work was created as part of a revitalization effort.

== Description ==
Cass Street Park is a series of large scale painted fiberglass sculptures designed to enhance a small park in the Brady Street neighborhood of Milwaukee. Elements include a cat-shaped gateway arch, a dragon, two light poles and a bird. All of the forms are painted in bright colors, adding to the whimsical feel of the site.

The gateway arch in the southwest corner of the park resembles Lewis Carroll's Cheshire Cat. The cat's legs create the sides of the arch, and its striped tail zigzags down one side. The body of the cat is painted teal, and its face and tail are striped with purple and red. Yellow spines march across its back.

The dragon has the form of a snake with a lop-eared, horn-topped head. The green, purple, and blue striped body of the work undulates up and down from the ground creating inverted-U humps on which children are invited to climb and play. The dragon is 18 feet long and its head is 6 feet tall. The face of the dragon is red with yellow snout and ears.

Two tall poles provide creature-clad lighting elements for the park. Their painted fiberglass bodies cover the posts of the lights, and whimsical heads cover the light globes. Illumination streams out from under their chins. These two works are each 13 feet tall.

The final sculptural element is a long-legged bird with a large pink head and bright yellow beak. Its head is topped with a red and purple comb, and its wing feathers splay to each side of its body. The figure has enormous pink three-toed feet. Its skinny legs are striped in yellow and orange with black kneecaps. The bird is 12 feet tall.

== Location ==
Cass Street Park is located at Cass Street Elementary School and is used as a playground. The work was recognized with the Mayor's Design Award in 1998.
