= Steel Reborn =

Artwork by Charles Toman

- Artist: Charles Toman
- Year: 1965
- Type: welded steel
- Dimensions: 1,100 cm (420 in)
- Location: Miller Compressing Company, Milwaukee, Wisconsin; 43°1′31.722″N 87°56′6.139″W
- Owner: Miller Compressing Company

Steel Reborn is a public art work by American artist Charles Toman, located in front of the Miller Compressing Company on the south side of Milwaukee, Wisconsin. The abstract artwork is a three-ton welded steel ball placed atop a 35-foot base. It is located at 1640 W Bruce St.

The work was commissioned by Miller Compressing to demonstrate the value of recycling. The artist selected the materials and fabricated the piece on site, which was originally on Jones Island. It was moved to its current location on W Bruce St at a later date.
