= Stone Bracelet =

Public artwork in Milwaukee, Wisconsin

- Artist: Zoran Mojsilov
- Year: 2000
- Type: stone
- Dimensions: 370 cm × 320 cm × 370 cm (145 in × 126 in × 145 in)
- Location: Paliafito Park; Milwaukee, Wisconsin; 43.022028°N 87.914306°W

Stone Bracelet is a public artwork by artist Zoran Mojsilov, located on the south side of Milwaukee, Wisconsin. The work is a large chiseled stone fitted with a stainless steel loop near its top from which smaller rocks are suspended on four sides of the sculpture. The artwork is located in a small park near Third and Walker Streets in the Walker's Point neighborhood. Stone Bracelet was commissioned through the Spirit of Milwaukee Neighborhood Millennium Art Initiative.
