= Sonja Thomsen =

American artist (born 1978)

- Born: 1978 (age 47–48); U.S.
- Education: Kenyon College (BA), San Francisco Art Institute (MFA)
- Occupations: Visual artist, educator
- Known for: Installation art, photography, video art, sculpture
- Website: sonjathomsen.com

Sonja Ruth Thomsen (born 1978) is an American multidisciplinary visual artist and educator. Working across photography, video art, and sculpture, Thomsen creates art installations that investigate light, perception, and space through feminist and scientific frameworks. She is a professor adjunct in the department of photography at the School of the Art Institute of Chicago.

== Education ==
Thomsen holds a Bachelor’s degree in Biology and Arts from Kenyon College in Gambier, Ohio, in 2000; and a Master of Fine Arts degree from the San Francisco Art Institute in 2004.

== Public art projects ==
=== Here Mothers Are ===
Created in 2012 by Thomsen in her first collaboration with Adam Carr, the public art project centered on the Amani neighborhood. It took the form of a temporary installation combining photography, audio, and text drawn from living room interviews with women and families connected to the Dominican Center for Women. Focusing on motherhood and inter-generational ties, the project collected reflections on mothers, grandmothers, and children.

=== Listening to Mitchell ===
In 2014, Thomsen, in collaboration with Adam Carr created a multimedia public art installation spanning seven blocks of Historic Mitchell Street on Milwaukee’s south side. Developed during the summer, the project engaged local residents and incorporated audio, photographic, and narrative elements drawn from the surrounding community. It was subsequently archived as a digital collection by the Milwaukee Public Library.

== Exhibitions ==
=== Solo exhibitions ===
- 2012: Echo, two-person exhibition with Charlotta María Hauksdóttir, Reykjavik City Museum, Reykjavik, Iceland
- 2015: Glowing Wavelengths In Between, DePaul Art Museum at DePaul University, Chicago, Illinois
- 2016: In Orbit, John Michael Kohler Art Center Glass Gallery, Sheboygan, Wisconsin
- 2017: In the Space of Elsewhere, Madison Museum of Contemporary Art, Madison, Wisconsin
- 2021: Marginal Notes, The Suburban, Milwaukee, Wisconsin
- 2022: By her own movement, Gallery 062, Chicago, Illinois
- 2022: By her own movement, Fonderia 20.9, Verona, Italy
- 2022–2023: Orbiting Lucia, as part of the exhibition Refracting Histories, Museum of Contemporary Photograph, Chicago, Illinois
- 2025: and then down became up, Lynden Sculpture Garden, Milwaukee, Wisconsin
- 2026: Proofs, Tangents, Echoes, Kiehle Gallery, St. Cloud State University, St. Cloud, MN

=== Group exhibitions ===
- 2011: Earth Now: American Photographers and the Environment, New Mexico Museum of Art, Santa Fe, New Mexico
- 2012: Shift, Parkland College, Champaign, Illinois
- 2014: Konstellationen, Gallery 5.6, Munich, Germany
- 2015: Photography Sees the Surface, Higher Pictures, New York
- 2015: Femme Papel, RayKo Photo Center, San Francisco, California
- 2017: New Bauhaus Chicago: Experiment Photography and Film, Bauhaus Archive
- 2017: New Bauhaus Chicago: Experiment Photography, Bauhaus Archive, Berlin, Germany
- 2018: Mary Nohl and the Walrus Club, John Michael Kohler Art Center, Sheboygan, Wisconsin
- 2020: pool, 2020” (with Thom Bridge), Photography & _____, Catherine Edelman Gallery, Chicago, Illinois
- 2022: Refracting Histories, Museum of Contemporary Photography, Chicago, Illinois
- 2023: Pause/Connect, Warehouse Art Museum, Milwaukee, Wisconsin

== Collections ==
- Art Institute of Chicago, Chicago, Illinois
- Milwaukee Art Museum, Milwaukee, Wisconsin
- Museum of Contemporary Photography, Chicago, Illinois
- DePaul University Art Museum, Chicago, Illinois

== Publications ==
- 2020: You Will Find it Where it is, a reader, Poor Farm Press, Wisconsin. Held in the MoMA Library and Yale's Robert B. Haas Family Arts Library
- 2020: Keeper of the Hearth: Picturing Roland Barthes, Odette England, Schlit Publishing, Amsterdam
- 2017: New Bauhaus Chicago: Experiment Photography, Hirmer Publishers, ISBN 978-3-7774-2937-3
- 2009: Lacuna

== Awards and fellowships ==
- 2025–2026: Josef Breitenbach Research Fellowship, Center for Creative Photography, University of Arizona
- 2025: BMC Active Archive Artist Residency
- 2023: Ruth Arts Mary L. Nohl Alumni Award
- 2024: Visual Studies Workshop Project Space Residency, Rochester, New York
- 2018: Cow House Studios Residency, Wexford County, Ireland
- 2015: Artist in Residence Latitude, Chicago, Illinois
- 2011: Mary L. Nohl Fund Fellowship for Established Artists, Greater Milwaukee Foundation, Greater Milwaukee Foundation
- 2008: Hermitage Artist Fellow, Hermitage Artist Retreat
- 2005: Mary L. Nohl Suitcase Export Fund
