= Deflected Jets =

Public artwork by Guido Peter Brink

- Artist: Guido Peter Brink
- Year: Commissioned in 1987; Installed in 1988
- Dimensions: 350 cm × 89 cm × 89 cm (136 in × 35 in × 35 in)
- Location: Milwaukee, Wisconsin; 42°58′49.42″N 88°01′04.83″W

Deflected Jets is a public artwork by American artist Guido Peter Brink located on the Fire Engine Company #29 grounds, which is at 3529 South 84th Street in Milwaukee, Wisconsin, in the United States. Commissioned in 1987 and installed the following year, the work consists of a stainless steel abstract form atop a red brick base, to which a placard is affixed. The total size of the piece is approximately 136 by 35 by 35 inches (345 cm × 89 cm × 89 cm).

== Description ==
Guido Brink's artwork outside the Fire Engine Company #29 of the Milwaukee Fire Department is an abstract sculpture in polished stainless steel placed atop a red brick base. It depicts "jets of water piercing and being repelled by a shield." The sculpture's stainless steel portion is approximately 7 feet 6 inches (2.29 m) in height, and the brick is 3 feet 10 inches (1.17 m) high. An inscription on the brass plate attached to the brick base reads:

Deflected Jets by Guido Brink
Dedicated to the Guardians of Public Safety
The Milwaukee Fire Department
1988
Mayor Henry N. Maier
City of Milwaukee Art Commission"

== Historical information ==
Deflected Jets won the 1987 City of Milwaukee Art Commission competition, and was unveiled by Mayor Henry N. Maier in January 1988. and was funded by a Percent for Art program. Many of the Percent for Art works that have been placed outside fire stations have been met with little enthusiasm from the firefighters as the depictions of the firefighters' work are seen as overly realistic. Brink's piece is an exception. According to Diane Buck, "Deflected Jets lyrically captures the spirit of a firefighter's commitment to the community. By creating a highly polished stainless steel sculpture of a shield and jets, which represent the water used by the firefighters and the courage they display, the artist gives the public the best in artistic imagination and craftsmanship."

== Artist ==
Brink was born in Düsseldorf in 1913, and worked at his uncle's stained glass studio after emigrating to Wisconsin in 1913. After a semester at Columbia University (1931) and a three-year apprenticeship, he attended the State Academy of Fine Arts in Düsseldorf from 1934 to 1939. Here he was very inspired by the work of Paul Klee. Being drafted immediately upon graduation, Brink fought on the Russian and Italian fronts (1940–45). After the war ended, Brink became a landscape painter and emigrated to New York City with his wife Ello; he spent 1952 studying with a fellowship at the Académie des Beaux-Arts Matiers d'Art in Paris. Shortly after, they moved to Milwaukee for Brink to pursue stained glass work. Here he worked at Conrad Schmitt Studios, and eventually became a faculty member of the Layton School of Art. When the school closed in 1974, Brink delved into three-dimensional work, taking advantage of Milwaukee's great wealth of fabricating and manufacturing plants. He became an artist in residence at Super Steel Products Corporation, and would stay there for more than 20 years. "His works seem to be influenced by the experience of growing up between two world wars in the battlegrounds of Europe. He sought mental equilibrium in torn world."

Brink's work can be found in public and private collections throughout the world, including outside Lapham Hall at the University of Wisconsin-Milwaukee, and in the Tory Folliard Gallery in Milwaukee's Third Ward.

== See also ==
- Environmental art
