= Spirit of the Firefighter =

Artwork by Mark Jeffries

- Artist: Mark Jeffries (artist)
- Year: 1983
- Type: bronze
- Dimensions: 190 cm × 60 cm × 37 cm (76 in × 23.5 in × 14.5 in)
- Location: 5335 W. Teutonia Ave., Milwaukee, Wisconsin; 43°6′53.195″N 87°57′1.354″W
- Owner: City of Milwaukee, Milwaukee Fire Department

Spirit of the Firefighter is a public art work by American artist Mark Jeffries, located on the north side of Milwaukee, Wisconsin. The bronze sculpture depicts a male figure wearing a firefighter's protective uniform: cuffed boots with trousers tucked inside, a long belted coat with toggle closures on the front, and a close-fitting hood. On top of his head is a brimmed hat with an "Engine 37 MFD" badge on the front. The figure's arms and hands are at his side. In one hand, he holds his two gloves. The sculpture is installed at 5335 W. Teutonia Ave. at Milwaukee Fire Department Engine Company #37.
