= The Last Alarm (sculpture) =

Public art sculpture at Milwaukee Fire Department headquarters

- Artist: Robert Daus
- Year: 1996
- Type: bronze
- Dimensions: 120 cm (48 in)
- Location: Milwaukee Fire Department; Milwaukee, Wisconsin; 43°2′24.334″N 87°55′13.855″W
- Owner: City of Milwaukee

The Last Alarm is a public art work by artist Robert Daus. It is located in front of the Milwaukee Fire Department headquarters in downtown Milwaukee, Wisconsin at 7th and Wells Streets.

== Description ==
The sculpture consists of bronze boots, jacket, gloves and helmet stacked neatly as if in preparation for a funeral procession. The boots stand upright and face forward, and the jacket is folded neatly on top. Gloves rest on top of the jacket and beneath a helmet bearing the Milwaukee Fire Department insignia. The sculpture is mounted on a black granite pedestal inscribed with the names of firefighters who sacrificed their lives in the line of duty. A brick plaza surrounds the work.
