= Evelyn Terry (artist) =

American visual artist

Evelyn Terry, also known as Evelyn P. Terry or Evelyn Patricia Terry (born 1946) is an American visual artist, art educator, writer, lecturer, exhibition curator and community advocate from Milwaukee, Wisconsin. Terry's mediums include printmaking, drawing, painting, installation, and public art. Her works are exhibited in local, national, and international exhibitions and collections, including in Russia and Japan.

== Early life and education ==
Terry was born to mother Jessie Mae Terry and raised in Milwaukee, Wisconsin. She attended North Division High School.

With a concentration in printmaking, she earned a BFA and a MS in visual arts from the University of Wisconsin-Milwaukee. She later earned an MFA from the School of the Art Institute of Chicago.

== Career ==
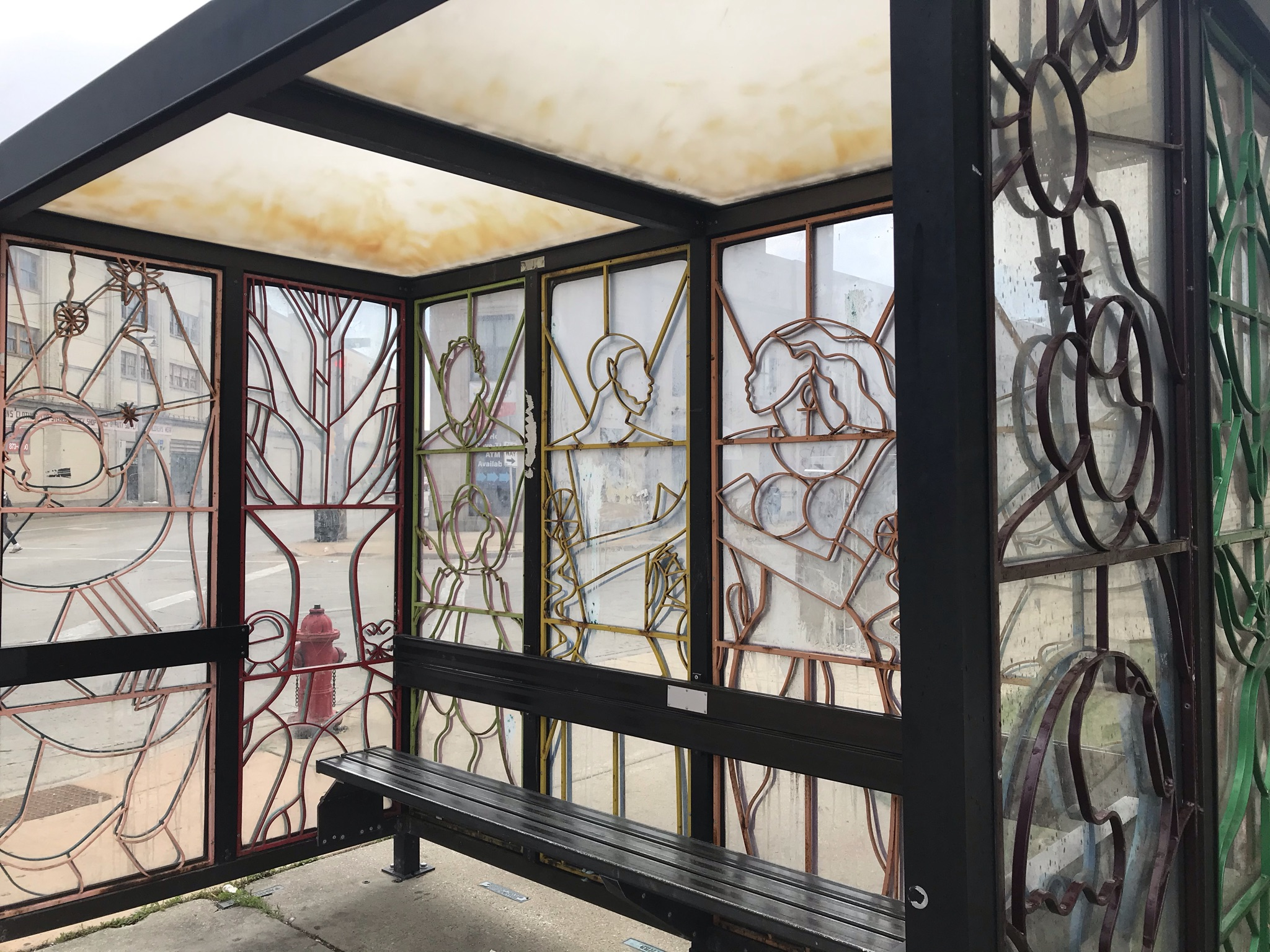
Kindred Ties bus shelter sculpture by Terry in Milwaukee

Terry's work has been locally, nationally, and internationally exhibited in both public and private collections, with over 400 private, corporate, and public collections featuring her work. Her pastel work Watermelon Slice is in the permanent collection of the Museum of Wisconsin Art and other artwork is featured in the Milwaukee Art Museum, the Haggerty Museum of Art at Marquette University, the Racine Art Museum, and the Wright Museum of Art at Beloit College.

Terry's 12-part sculpture Giving Gifts is located in the Milwaukee Mitchell International Airport parking facility. The public artwork represents ethnic legacies in Milwaukee and was completed in 2002 by Terry with welding by George Ray McCormick Sr.

In 2009, Terry converted her Victorian home in Milwaukee to an art gallery, the Terry McCormick Contemporary Fine and Folk Art Gallery, in honor of Artist George Ray McCormick, Sr.

== Awards ==
- 2012: Wisconsin Visual Artist Lifetime Achievement Award
- 2014: Artist of the Year (Milwaukee Arts Board)
