= Brady Street Beasts =

Sculpture in Milwaukee, Wisconsin

Coordinates: 43°03′12.9″N 87°54′11.6″W

Cavorting Critters: Seriously Working at Life
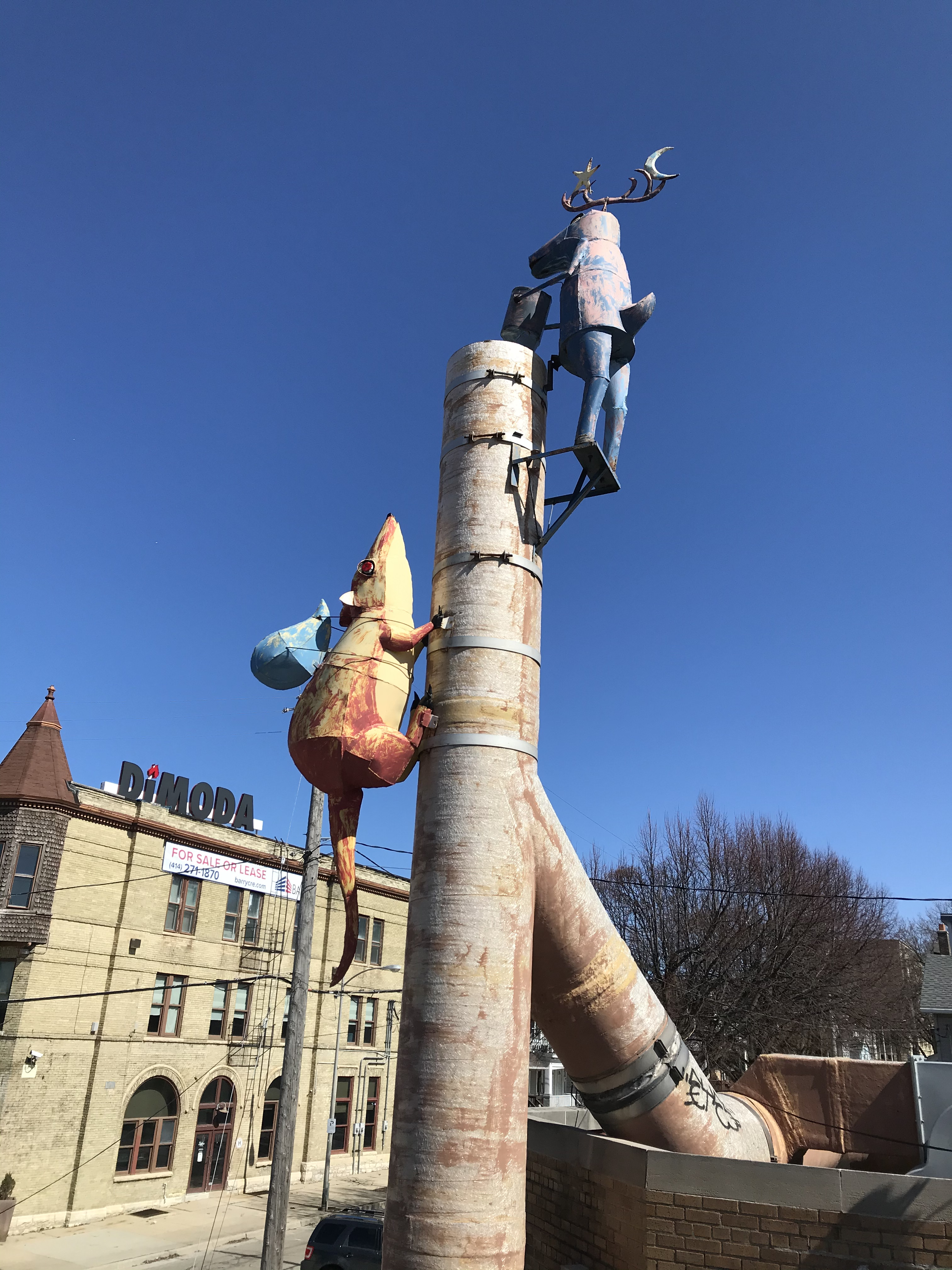
- Artist: Bill Reid
- Year: 2002
- Type: painted steel
- Location: Milwaukee, Wisconsin

Cavorting Critters or Brady Street Beasts is a public art work by American artist Bill Reid located on the East Side of Milwaukee, Wisconsin near Brady Street and the Holton Street Viaduct. The artwork consists of three creatures made of painted steel.

== Description ==
Brady Street Beasts includes a large blue reindeer accompanied by a red rat and a green dragonfly. The sculptures are constructed from sheet metal welded together on top of a substructure of metal rods. The reindeer appears to have scaled to the top of an exhaust chimney above a public works building. Its yellow antlers extend into the sky, and it grasps a paint can from which blue liquid appears to flow into the opening of the chimney. On the opposite side of the chimney, the rat climbs upward. On the roof of the building adjacent to the chimney, a bug-eyed green dragonfly stands with a telescope to its eye. A nearby weather vane includes three words, each painted on a bar with two arrowheads on either end: water, reflection, good food.

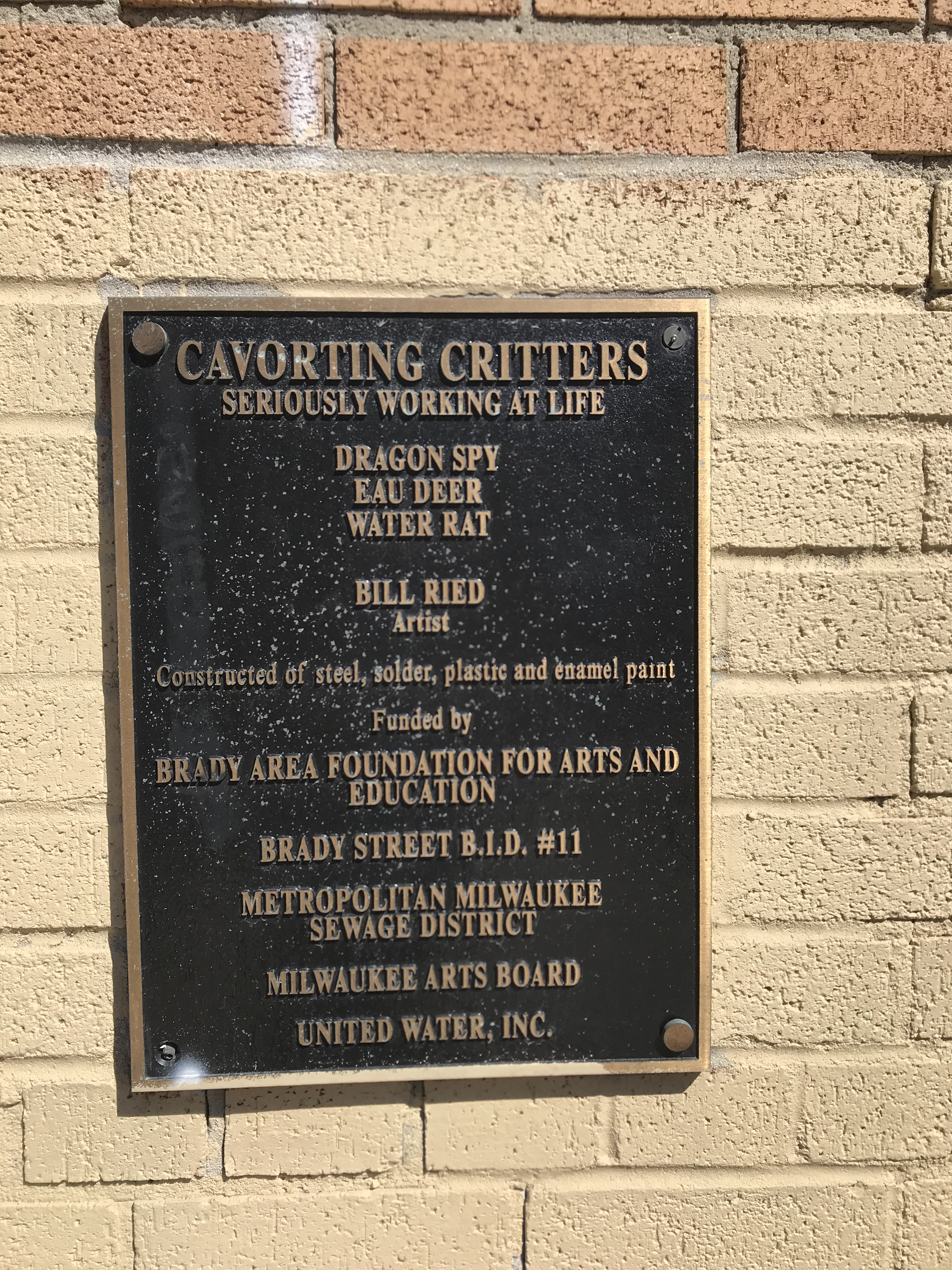
Plaque detailing the piece
