= Happy-Go-Luckies of Nature and Technology =

Public artwork by Guido Brink

- Artist: Guido Brink
- Year: 1992
- Dimensions: 370 cm × 370 cm × 240 cm (144 in × 144 in × 96 in)
- Location: Milwaukee; 43°4′32″N 87°53′4″W

Happy-Go-Luckies of Nature and Technology is a public artwork by German artist Guido Brink located on the University of Wisconsin–Milwaukee campus, which is near Milwaukee, Wisconsin, United States. The sculpture is a steel structure that is painted red. It was dedicated at UWM's Lapham Hall on October 23, 1992.

== Description ==
Happy-Go-Luckies of Nature and Technology is a red kinetic sculpture consisting of three legs that become four abstracted heads resting on open arms. There is a propeller with three blades at the center of the sculpture. "Abstracted humanoid forms have geometric cut shapes around perimeter and geometric-shaped negative spaces. Head forms have three disks and one arrow mounted on stainless steel rods."

== Historical information ==
The sculpture was funded by the Wisconsin Percent for Art program as part of Lapham Hall's new addition. It was commissioned by the University of Wisconsin-Milwaukee. Happy-Go-Luckies of Nature and Technology was installed by the artist on the south side of Lapham Hall and dedicated in October 1992.

== Artist ==
Guido Brink was born in Düsseldorf, Germany in 1913. He came to New York as a teenager with the purpose of working at A.L. Brink Studios, his uncle's stained glass studio. The artist returned to Germany after three years in the United States, and attended the State Academy of Fine Arts in Düsseldorf where he studied under Maximillian Clarenbach. "Brink vividly recalls his experience as a young art student compelled by Hitler, along with other art students, to view the famous 1937 exhibition of Degenerate Art, organized at the former Munich Architectural Institute. Contrary to Hitler's intentions, the young artists were excited by the so-called degenerate art and would in time develop new directions in their own work inspired by the modern art of the condemned artists." He was drafted by the German Army upon graduation and sent to Russia, where he fought on the front. The artist moved to New York City with his wife Ello in 1952. "The couple came to Milwaukee in 1953 for Brink to work as a stained glass window artist for the Conrad Schmitt Studios. They settled in Milwaukee where Ello worked as architectural critic for The Milwaukee Journal; in 1953 Guido became a faculty member at the Layton School of Art where he remained until its closing in 1974." Brink began his career as a painter, yet was intrigued by three-dimensional works. He thus turned to Milwaukee's craftspeople to translate his paintings into sculpture. For more than twenty years Brink was an artists in residence at Super Steel Products Corporation where he produced his humanoid sculptures. "These flat, angular profiles positioned in poetic angles are free-standing works, mostly in brightly painted metal. Sometimes referred to as "Techno-Spirits," these sculptures are the artist's signature works." Happy-Go-Luckies of Nature and Technology falls into this category.
