= First Flight (sculpture) =

Sculpture by Richard Taylor in Milwaukee, US

- Artist: Richard Taylor
- Year: 2012
- Type: painted aluminum
- Dimensions: 610 cm (240 in)
- Location: Milwaukee Youth Arts Center; Milwaukee, Wisconsin; 43.052384°N 87.915094°W
- Owner: City of Milwaukee

First Flight is a public art work by artist Richard Taylor. It is located in front of the Milwaukee Youth Arts Center north of downtown Milwaukee, Wisconsin near 3rd and Walnut Streets. The sculpture is made of aluminum sheets cut and welded and painted white. The work was commissioned by First Stage to commemorate its 25th anniversary.
