= Edmund Lewandowski =

American painter

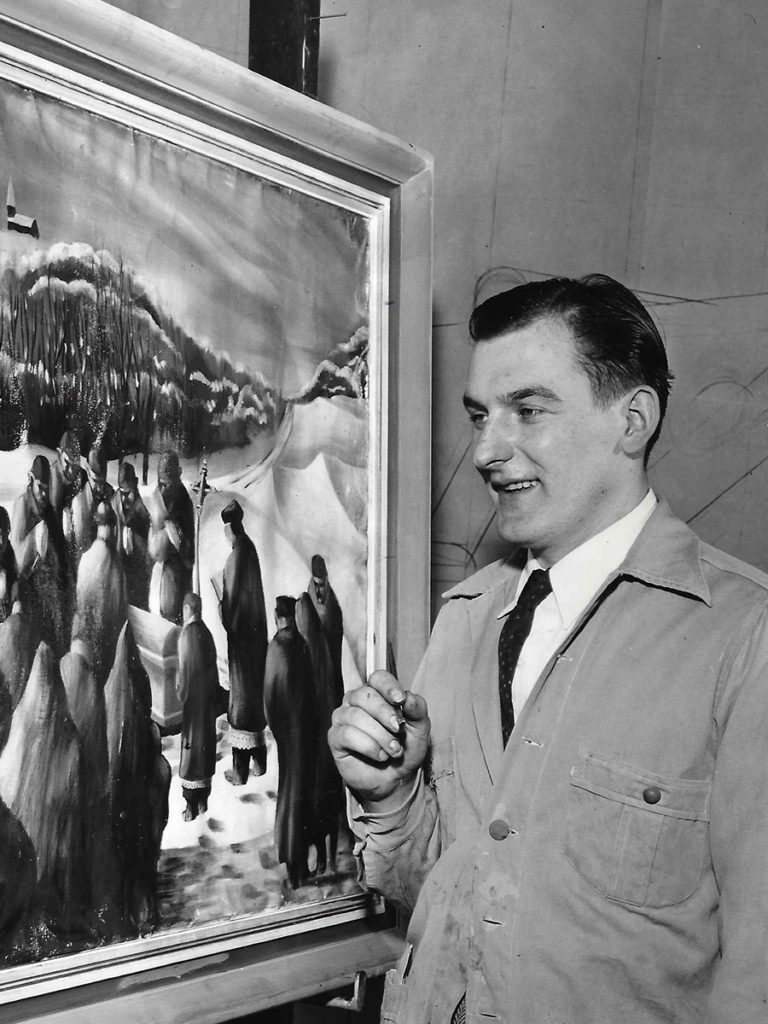
- Edmund Lewandowski in 1940
- Born: July 3, 1914; Milwaukee, Wisconsin, US
- Died: September 7, 1998 (aged 84); Rock Hill, South Carolina, US
- Education: Layton School of Art
- Known for: Painting
- Movement: Precisionism, Social Realism, Regionalism

Edmund D. Lewandowski (July 3, 1914 – September 7, 1998) was an American Precisionist artist who was often exhibited in the Downtown Gallery alongside other artists such as Charles Sheeler, Charles Demuth, Georgia O'Keeffe, Ralston Crawford, George Ault, and Niles Spencer.

== Early life ==
Edmund Lewandowski was born in Milwaukee, Wisconsin, on July 3, 1914. He attended the Layton School of Art from 1931 until his graduation in 1934.

== Career ==
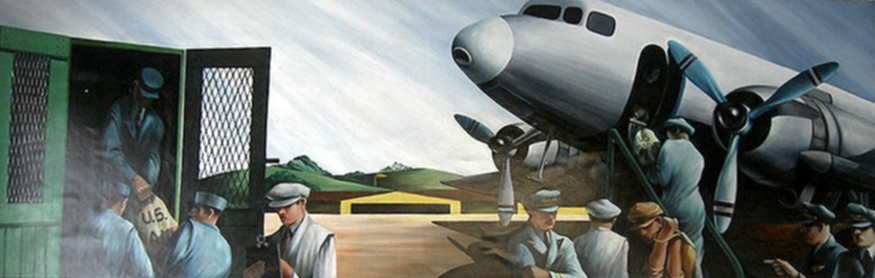
Air Mail Service (1940), post office mural in Stoughton, Wisconsin

He assumed a public school teaching position to make a living while he pursued painting on his own and sought commissions in advertising and magazine illustration. In 1936, he was invited by prominent modern art dealer Edith Halpert to join her Downtown Gallery. That same year, he began painting United States post office murals commissioned by the Section of Painting and Sculpture. During 1939 and 1940 executed murals for the post office in Caledonia, Minnesota, titled Hog Raising; Hamilton, Illinois, titled On the River; and Stoughton, Wisconsin, titled Air Mail Service.

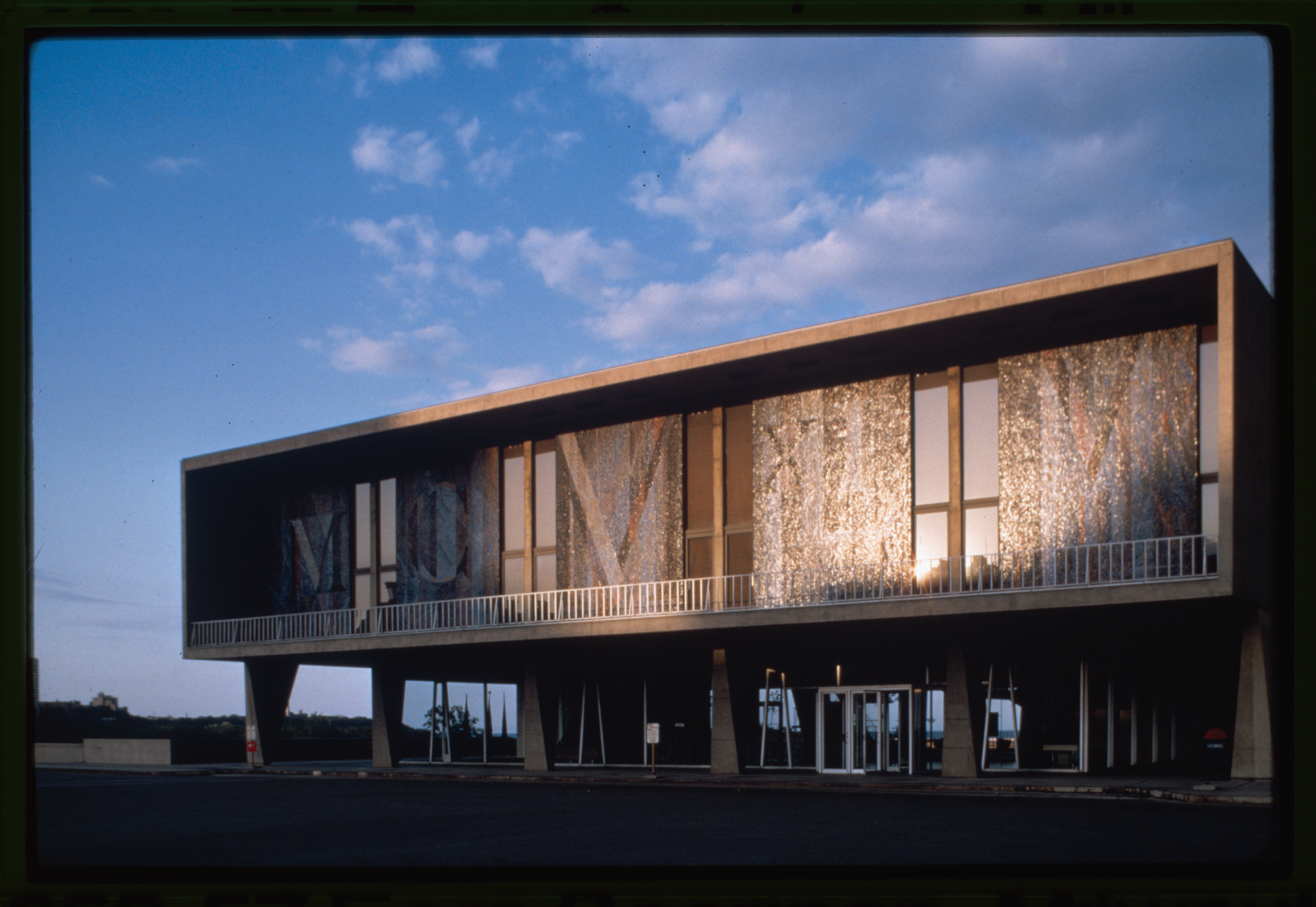
Lewandowski's mosaic, western facade of the Milwaukee County War Memorial, c. 1957

From 1942 to 1946, Lewandowski made maps and camouflage for the United States Army Air Forces and United States Air Force. The otherworldly clarity of Lewandowski's work won him inclusion in a show themed around Magic Realism at the Museum of Modern Art in 1943. In 1947, he was appointed to the faculty of the Layton School of Art. In 1949, he moved to Florida State University, where he remained until 1954. Following his tenure in Florida, he returned to the Layton School as director. Soon after, architect Eero Saarinen asked him to create a mosaic for the western facade of the new Milwaukee County War Memorial he was designing, which would also host the new Milwaukee Art Center.

Lewandowski's final position was as professor and chairman of the Art Department at Winthrop University in Rock Hill, South Carolina, from 1973 until 1984. Upon his retirement, he was named an emeritus professor of the institution. He died in Rock Hill on September 7, 1998.

== Bibliography ==
- Leeds, Valerie Ann (2010). Edmund Lewandowski: Precisionism and Beyond. Flint, MI: Flint Institute of Arts. ISBN 978-0939896301.
