= Egon Weiner =

American sculptor (1906–1987)

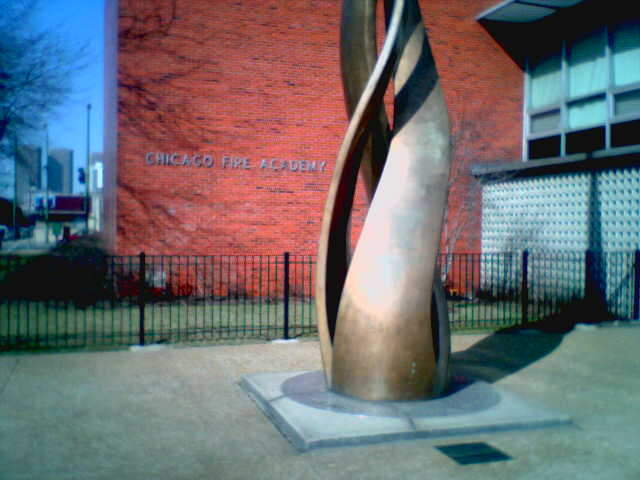
Egon Weiner's sculpture, Pillar of Fire

Egon Weiner (1906 – August 1, 1987) was a Chicago sculptor and longtime professor (1945–1971) at the Art Institute of Chicago. He was known for a 33-foot-tall (10 m) abstract bronze sculpture, Pillar of Fire, which can be found on the grounds of the Chicago Fire Academy on the spot where, legend has it, Mrs. O'Leary's cow knocked over the lantern that started the Great Chicago Fire of 1871.

== Significant works ==
Frank Lloyd Wright Monument at the entrance of Austin Gardens, Oak Park, Illinois.

== Books by Weiner ==
- Art and Human Emotions. Springfield, IL: Thomas, 1974.

== Sources ==
- Obituary: "Egon Weiner, 81, sculptor, created 'Pillar of Fire'" (Chicago Sun-Times August 1, 1987, by Leslie Baldacci).

== Newspaper coverage ==
- Numerous articles on Weiner, spanning several decades, can be found at Google News.
