= Tom Fruin =

American sculptor

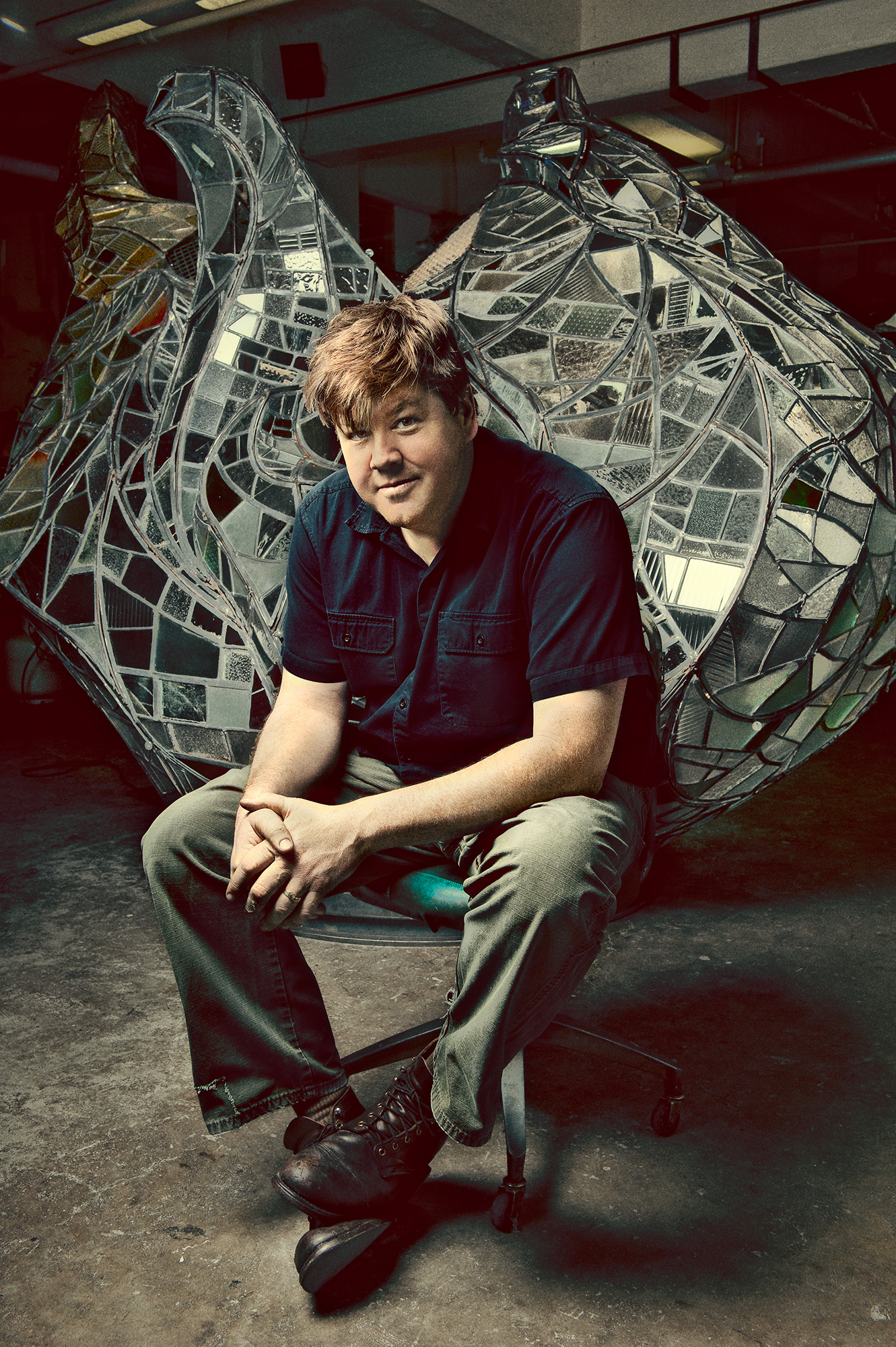
- Born: 1974; Los Angeles, California
- Known for: Sculpture

Tom Fruin (born 1974, Los Angeles) is a contemporary American sculptor. He lives and works in Brooklyn, New York City. Fruin graduated from University of California, Santa Barbara with a BA in 1996.

== Work ==
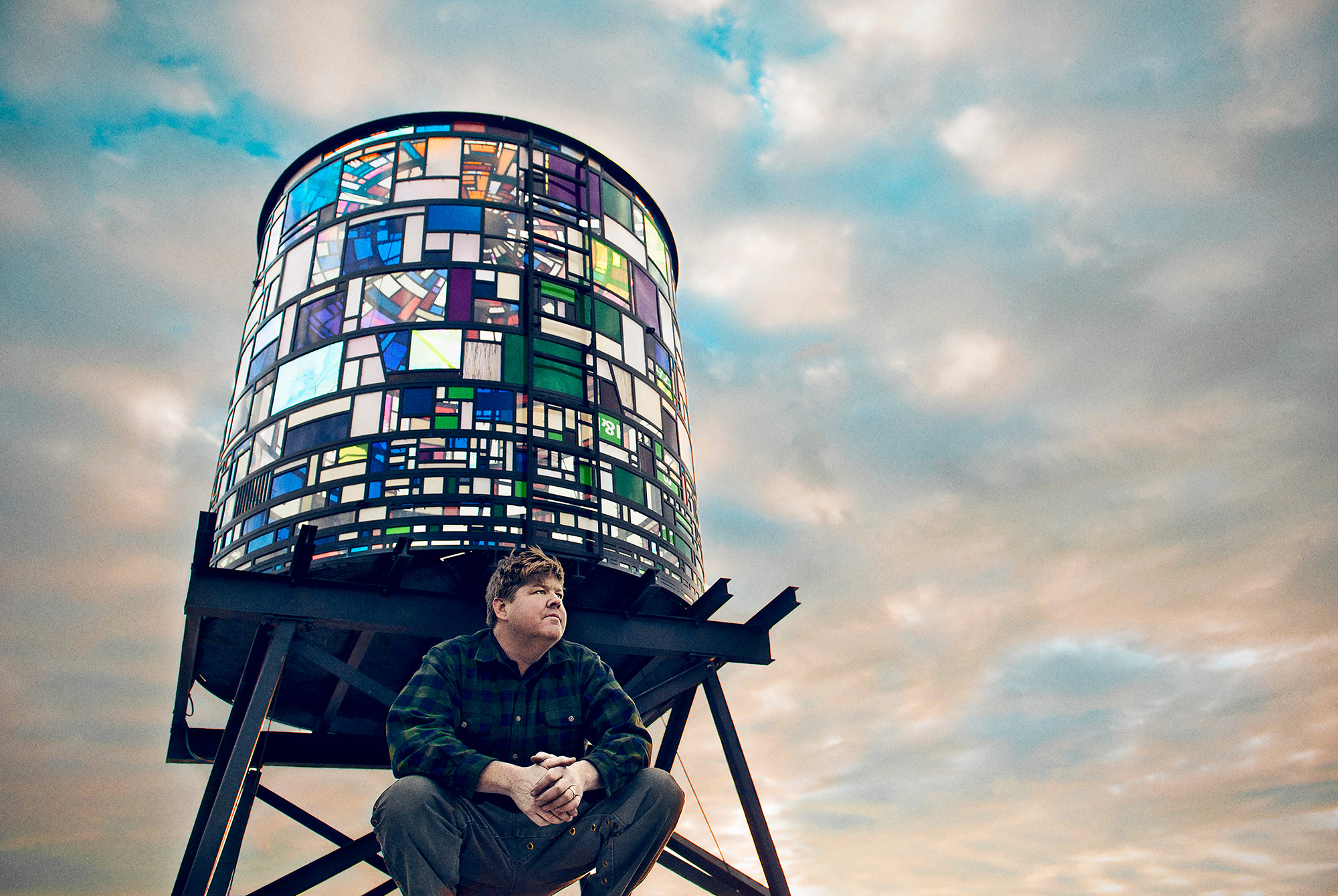
Tom Fruin and Watertower

Known for his large installations, Fruin most commonly uses steel and highly colored plexiglass to create monumental sculptures alluding to local buildings. He has said he aims to make art that is publicly accessible and sustainable by working with reclaimed materials and alternative energy. Fruin's largest installation to date, the Watertower series, is installed on rooftops across New York City and around the country. Other large works have been exhibited in public plazas in Prague, Vienna, Copenhagen and throughout the United States.
