= St. Joan of Arc Chapel =

Church in Milwaukee, Wisconsin

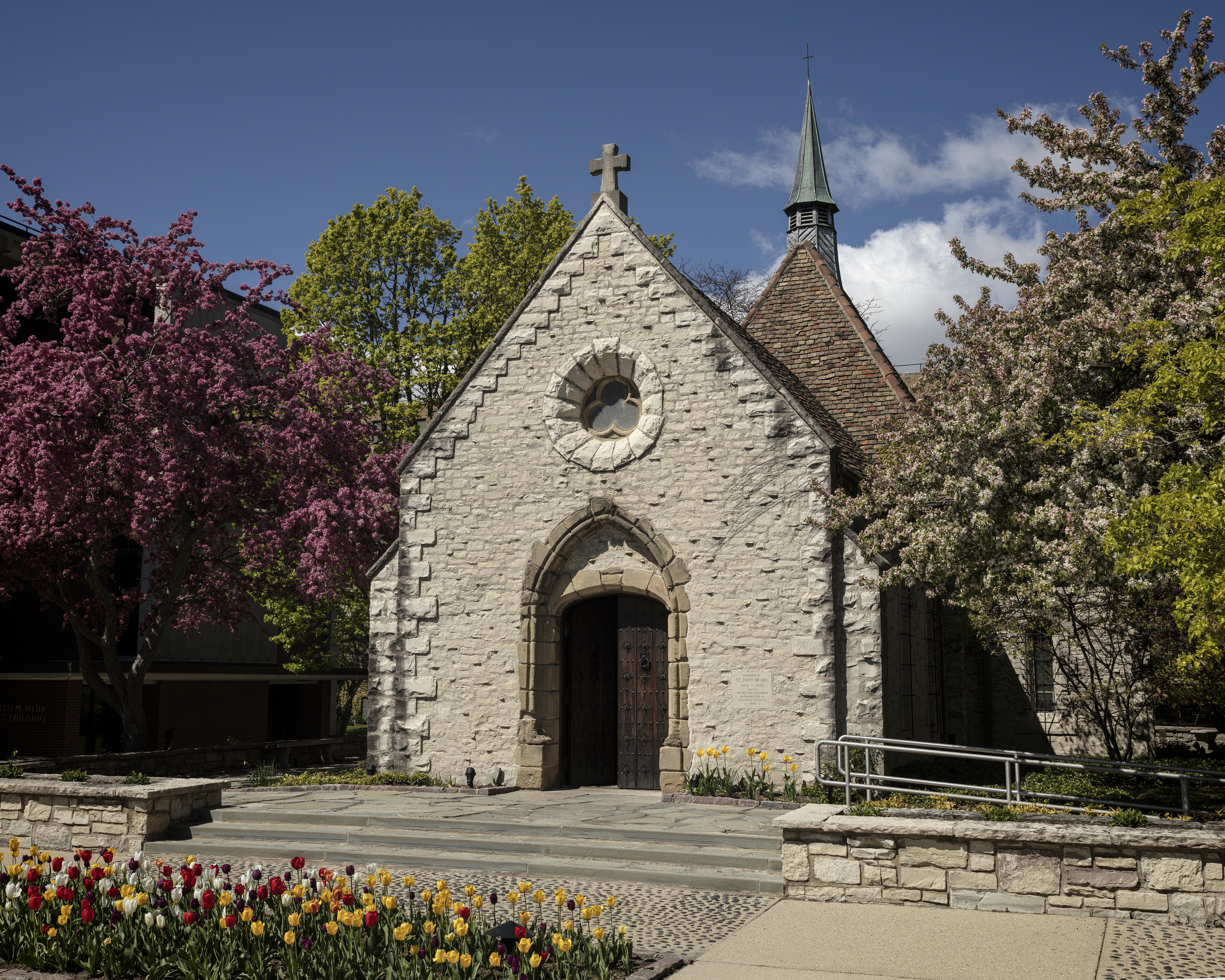
- St. Joan of Arc Chapel, Marquette University

Religion
- Affiliation: Catholic
- Diocese: Roman Catholic Archdiocese of Milwaukee
- Status: Active

Location
- Location: Marquette University, Milwaukee, Wisconsin, United States
- State: Wisconsin
- Interactive map of St. Joan of Arc Chapel
- Coordinates: 43°02′15″N 87°55′52″W

Architecture
- Architects: Jacques Couëlle, John Russell Pope, Lucien David and Earnest Bonnamy (restorations)
- Type: Chapel
- Style: Gothic
- Completed: c. 1420 for original structure May 26, 1966 in Milwaukee
- Materials: Stone, wood

Website
- marquette.edu/chapel

St. Joan of Arc Chapel is a Roman Catholic chapel today located in Milwaukee, Wisconsin, United States, on the campus of Marquette University, in the Archdiocese of Milwaukee. It was dedicated to Joan of Arc on 26 May 1966, after it had been moved from its previous location on Long Island, New York. It was originally built in the Rhône River Valley in France.

== History ==
=== In France ===
Originally named Chapelle de St. Martin de Seyssuel, the chapel was built over several generations in the French village of Chasse-sur-Rhône, south of Lyon. It is estimated that it was erected around the 15th century. The building was abandoned after the French Revolution and fell into ruin. According to a sign on display at the original site in France, Joan of Arc may have visited and prayed at the chapel on 9 March 1429 after meeting King Charles VII of France. Legend relates that Joan prayed to a statue of the Virgin Mary while standing on a flat stone that is now behind the altar. Joan is said to have kissed the stone; ever since, the temperature of that stone has been reported to be colder than those surrounding it.

After World War I, the young architect Jacques Couëlle rediscovered the chapel and negotiated its transfer to the Brookville, New York, home of Gertrude Hill Gavin, the daughter of James J. Hill, best known as the founder of the Great Northern Railway. Couëlle went so far as to refer to the chapel as "ce monument absolument unique en son genre" (the most absolutely unique monument of its kind).

=== In New York ===
The chapel was shipped to Brookville in 1927 and reconstructed there for its new owner by John Russell Pope. There it was attached to a mock French Renaissance chateau. Although the chateau burned down in 1962, the chapel was not damaged. After Gavin died, her estate passed to Marc B. Rojtman and his wife, Lillian. who decided to present the chapel to Marquette University in 1964.

=== At Marquette University ===
The transfer of the chapel took more than nine months, and another eight months passed before reconstruction began. Lucien David and Earnest Bonnamy planned the second reconstruction.

== Features ==
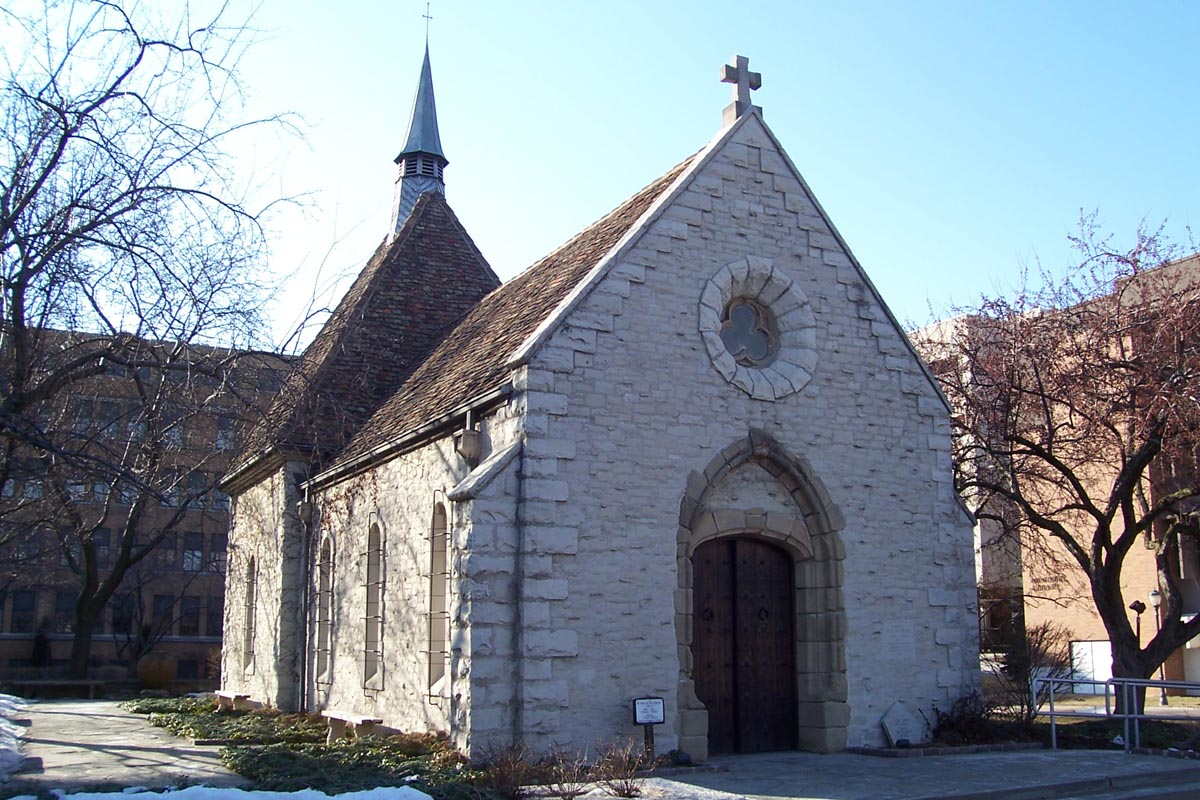
St. Joan of Arc Chapel

The tomb of Chevalier de Sautereau, a former Chatelain of Chasse and Compagnon d'Armes of Bayard, is still located in the floor of the sanctuary.

The chapel features Christian artifacts that predate the original chapel, in some instances by multiple centuries, and which have been collected and displayed in the chapel, including ancient Spanish tapestries, coats of arms, crucifixes, and even a contemporary rooftop. It is one of the few exhibits of items from antiquity that visitors are permitted to handle or touch.

The stained glass windows are not original: Gertrude Hill Gavin, the owner of the chapel in New York, commissioned the windows. Charles J. Connick created and installed them in 1929. Connick modeled the color scheme of the windows on those of the stained glass windows in the Cathedral of St. John the Divine in New York City.
