= Kneeling Camels =

Sculptures by Paul Moulon

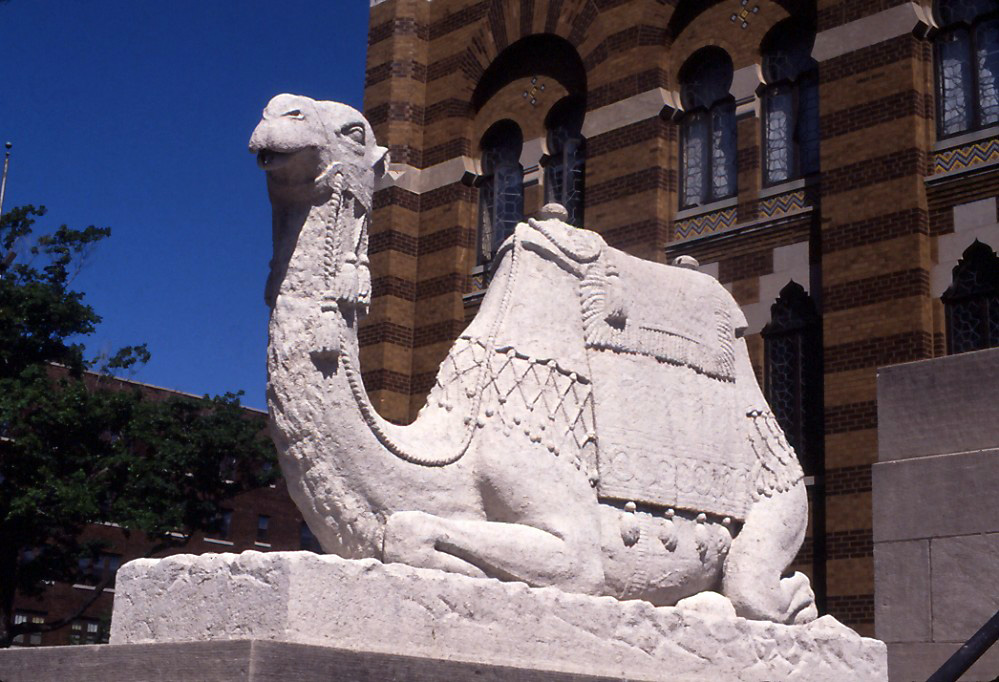
- Artist: Paul Moulon
- Year: 1928
- Type: carved stone
- Dimensions: 210 cm × 150 cm × 64 cm (84 in × 60 in × 25 in)
- Location: 3000 W. Wisconsin Ave., Milwaukee, Wisconsin; 43.038893°N 87.951713°W
- Owner: Tripoli Shrine Temple

Kneeling Camels is a public art work by Paul Moulon located at front entrance of the Tripoli Shrine Temple, a civic organization in the Concordia neighborhood west of downtown Milwaukee, Wisconsin. The work consists of two large camels carved from stone. The two sculptures were installed in 1928 at a cost of $10,000.

== Description ==
The camels flank the stairway entrance to the Tripoli Shrine Temple on West Wisconsin Avenue. The carving on each camel includes details such as reins and saddle, both with tassel decoration. Temple business administrator George Vignyvich told the Milwaukee Journal Sentinel, that the camels are "one of the symbols used by the Shrine. Other Tripoli shrines use live camels. We use concrete ones."

== Information ==
The camels were commissioned by Louis Kuehn, a Shrine leader and founder of the Milwaukee Corrugating Company, the largest sheet metal company in the Midwest, and an organizer of the Milwaukee Rolling Mill. Kuehn arranged the commission while traveling in Europe.

== Reception ==
The camels are popular among visitors, many of whom attempt to climb on top of them for photo opportunities.

== Condition ==
Save Outdoor Sculpture! volunteers conducting a condition survey for the Smithsonian Institution urgently recommended treatment for the sculptures in 1997.
