= Tripoli Shrine Temple =

- Tripoli Temple
- U.S. National Register of Historic Places
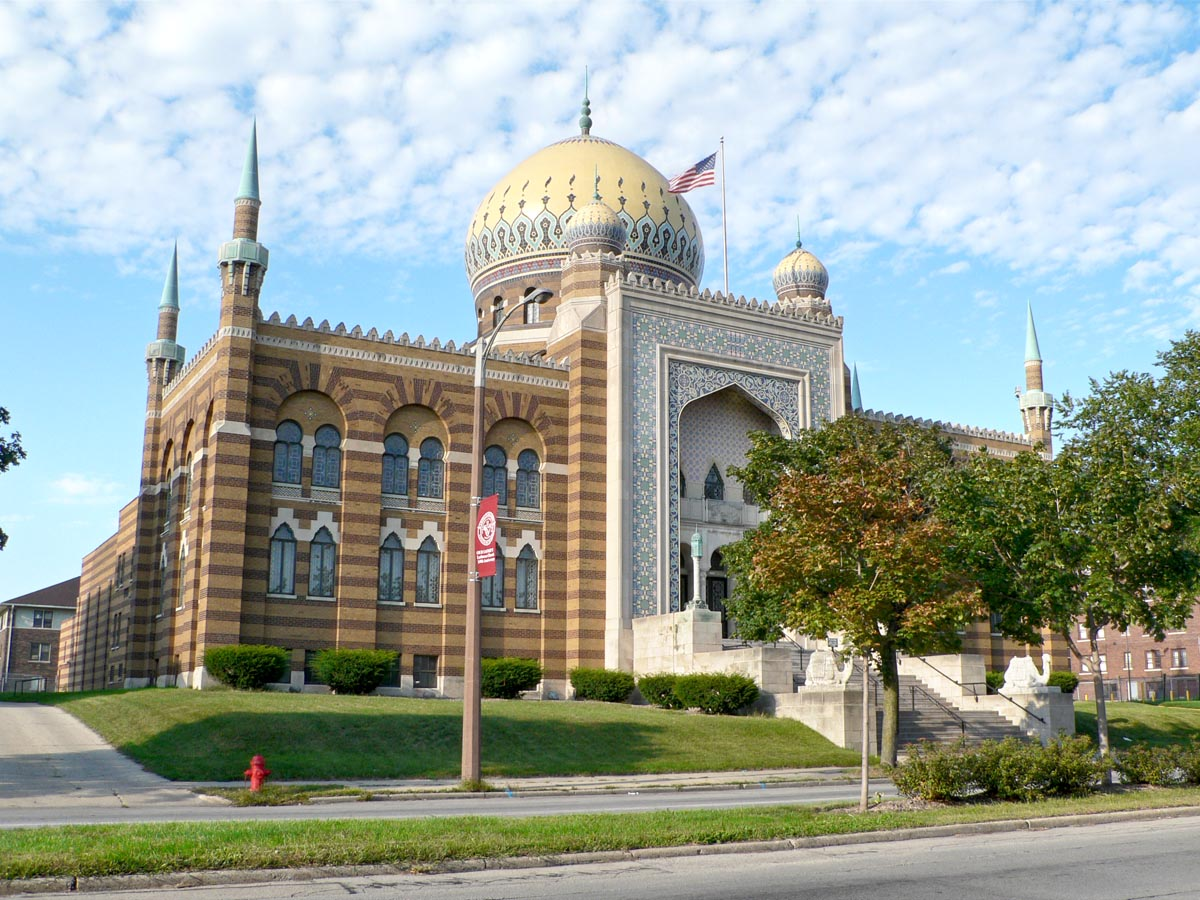
- Tripoli Shrine Temple

- Location within Wisconsin Location within the United States
- Location: 3000 W. Wisconsin Ave., Milwaukee, Wisconsin
- Coordinates: 43°2′21″N 87°57′5″W
- Area: 3.5 acres (1.4 ha)
- Built: 1926
- Architect: Clas, Shepard & Clas
- MPS: West Side Area MRA
- NRHP reference No.: 86000142
- Added to NRHP: January 16, 1986

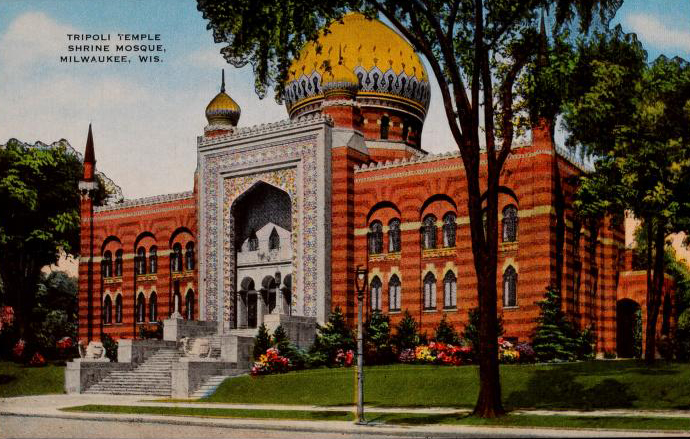
Tripoli Shrine Temple by James Tanis

The Tripoli Shrine Temple is a Shriners temple built 1926–28 in the Concordia neighborhood of Milwaukee, Wisconsin. The building's design incorporates Moorish and Indian elements, somewhat resembling the Taj Mahal in India. It is not a religious building. It is listed on the National Register of Historic Places as Tripoli Temple.

== Description ==
The Tripoli Shrine was founded in 1885 by nobles from the Medinah Temple in Chicago, a fraternal order that traces its lineage to a Masonic lodge established in 1843 by early settlers of Milwaukee. This lodge later founded a dozen other lodges.

Tripoli Temple was designed by architects Alfred Clas and Shepard in Moorish Revival style. Built at a cost of $616,999.61, it formally opened on May 14, 1928, after over two years of construction. It was the first temple in Wisconsin, and was home to 13,000 Shriners in the area. The building is one of the best of examples of Moorish Revival architecture in the United States, a style that was particularly popular for synagogues and movie theaters. The Temple's design is loosely based on the Taj Mahal, with the addition of Mudéjar style polychrome stone coursing. An ornately tiled main dome that spans 30 feet in diameter crowns the structure and is flanked by two smaller domes of like design. Sculptures depicting a pair of kneeling camels grace the entrance, while the interior is decorated with ceramic tile of intricate floral designs and plaster lattice work.

== See also ==
- Moorish Revival
- Kneeling Camels
