= Neighborhoods of Milwaukee =

Location of Milwaukee in Milwaukee County (left) and Wisconsin (right)

The neighborhoods of Milwaukee are mostly unofficial designations of parts of Wisconsin's largest city. There is no consensus definition of which parts of the city fall into which neighborhoods.

In 1990, the Neighborhood Identification Project set boundaries and names for 75 areas of the city. Prior to that, neighborhood names were not official and many areas had no names, official or otherwise.

== North Side ==
=== Arlington Heights ===
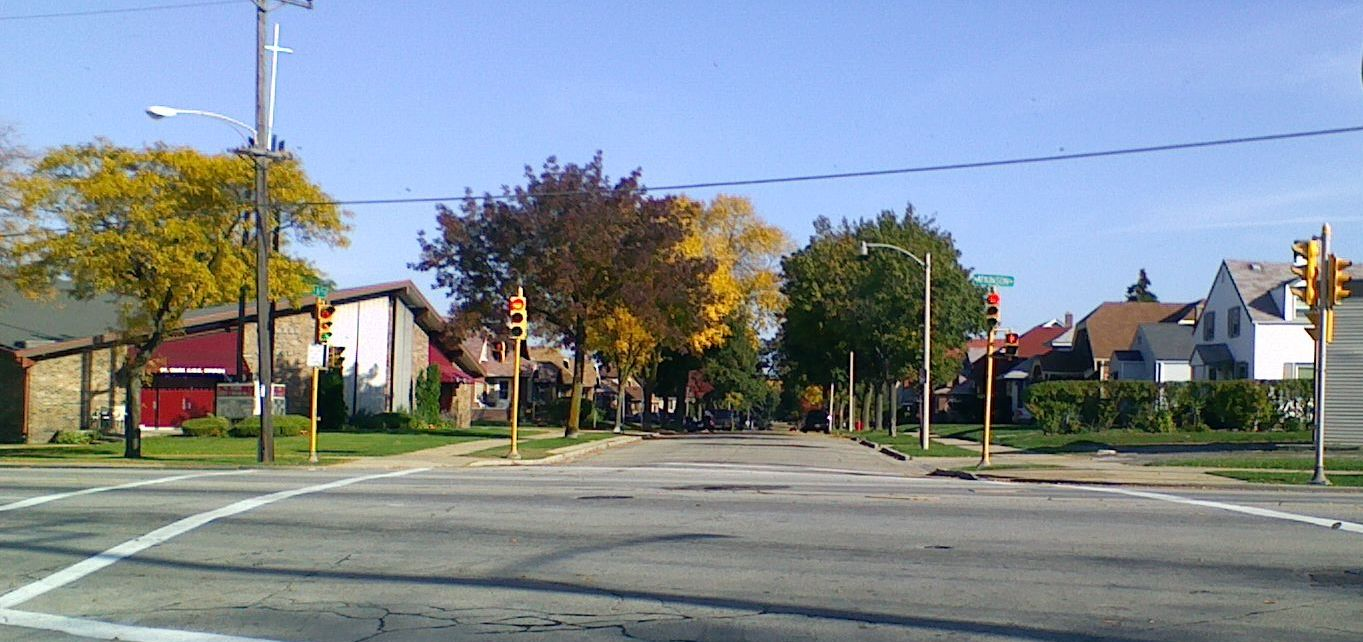
N 16th Street and W Atkinson

Arlington Heights is a neighborhood on Milwaukee's north side. It is bordered by Capitol Drive to the north, I-43 to the east, Keefe Avenue to the south and 20th Street to the west. It is home to Lindbergh Park, an elementary school, a middle school, and a Lutheran grade school. Union Cemetery is located at the far southwest corner of the neighborhood.

=== Brewers' Hill ===
Brewers' Hill is a neighborhood north of downtown on the Milwaukee River. The neighborhood is bordered by North Avenue to the north, the Milwaukee River and Holton Avenue to the east, Pleasant Street to the south, and Dr Martin Luther King Jr Drive to the west.

The name Brewers' Hill (formerly "Uihlein Hill") is derived from the large number of brewery workers and owners who once inhabited the area. Just to the south of the neighborhood, the Schlitz and Blatz breweries once operated. It is a mixed neighborhood where a laborer's cottage could stand across the street from a manager's stylish house.

Neighborhood lore suggests baseball hall of famer, Hank Aaron, resided in Brewer's Hill during his time with the Milwaukee Braves.

Brewers' Hill contains an architectural mix of Greek Revival, Italianate, Queen Anne (including Stick-style), and Colonial Revival buildings dating from the 1850s to the 1920s. The neighborhood has undergone gentrification, with former factories converted into businesses and condominiums. Part of the neighborhood, the Brewers' Hill Historic District, is listed on the National Register of Historic Places, comprising 130 structures built from 1855 to 1929, including:

- The Fitch house at 1825 N. 2nd St. is a rather simple 2-story brick cube with Italianate styling built in 1859. This was the home of Baron Von Cotzhausen, a descendant of Prussian nobility who lived there from 1863 to 1868, practicing law in Milwaukee.
- The house at 102 W. Vine St. is a 2-story frame house in Italianate style with a Gothic Revival emphasis on the vertical, built in 1873.
- The Miller Brewery Bar at 301 E. Garfield Ave is a 2-story structure with decorative brickwork on two sides, built in 1880.
- The James Knox house at 1843–1845 N. Palmer Street is a two-story brick and stone Queen Anne-styled house with a Gothic Revival-styled gable window. It was designed by Charles Gombert and built in 1881 for tanner Charles Scheiderer.
- The Oldenburg house at 303–305 E. Lloyd St is a 2.5-story house with a 3-story tower and Eastlake ornamentation, built in 1882. It is the only Italian villa-style house in the Brewers' Hill district.
- The Lubotsky residence at 1830 N 1st Street is a 2-story Queen Anne-styled house with a Stick style facade, built in 1890.
- 131–133 E. Lloyd St. is a 2.5-story frame Queen Anne-styled home built in 1901, with the shingles in the gable end which are typical of the style. It is one of many Queen Anne homes in the district.

In 2009, This Old House named Brewers' Hill as one of its "Best Old House Neighborhoods," where the neighborhood was referred to as "a distinctly Victorian-era neighborhood that's found new life in recent years as rehabbers buy up its blighted old mansions and restore them into beautiful urban homes."

=== Franklin Heights ===
Franklin Heights is bordered by Capitol Drive to the north, 20th Street to the east, Burleigh Street to the south, and 35th Street to Townsend Street to the railroad tracks on the west. One third of the Franklin Heights population lives below the poverty line.

=== Granville ===
Granville is a historically working-class neighborhood located on Milwaukee's far northwest side, featuring new subdivisions, industrial parks, and Granville Station. Formerly the Northridge mall, the Station has undergone extensive renovations and is attracting new large-format tenants.

=== Grover Heights ===
Located on the fringes of Williamsburg and encompassing parts of Glendale, Grover Heights is bordered by the Milwaukee River to the north, Port Washington Avenue to the east, Capitol Drive to the south and I-43 to the west. Built on lots carved from swampland or wetlands that bordered the river, Grover Heights’ houses were built between 1926 and 1930. Its occupants were primarily German until the 1960s, when immigrant descendants moved to the suburbs. Its first African-American family moved into the area in 1961. The neighborhood has had high stability. Currently Grover Heights has a diverse population consisting of African Americans, Caucasians, and Latinos. Its area forms one of the primary borders of the 5 Points Neighborhood Association, Inc.

=== Halyard Park ===
Halyard Park is bordered by North Avenue to the north, Dr Martin Luther King Jr Drive (3rd Street) to the east, Walnut Street to the south and 6th Street / Halyard Street to the west. It is a residential neighborhood; new condominiums and sprawling residential lots with post-1980 construction are the norm. Carver Park buffers the area from I-43 and is the area's largest park. It was the site of speeches from visiting US presidents in the early 1900s. Beechie Brooks, resident, was the developer who in the early 1980s redeveloped the area from Brown Street north to Garfield Avenue and from 4th Street west to Halyard Street.

=== Harambee ===
Main page: Harambee (neighborhood)

Harambee is a Swahili word for "pulling together". Since the mid-1970s, it has become the most widely used name for a neighborhood on Milwaukee's north side. There is a strong push to redefine the larger area into the Upper Riverwalk District as the entire area is located between two points in the Milwaukee River and has close proximity to the expanding river walk. Draped across a steep ridge overlooking Downtown, the Harambee area is a community of historic homes, churches, and more than 20,000 people. Its name signifies two things: the African heritage of most residents; and a new spirit of "pulling together" that has taken root in an old neighborhood.

The Harambee community is just north of downtown Milwaukee and is bounded by Keefe Avenue to the north, Holton Street to the east, North Avenue to the south, and I-43 to the west. Harambee includes the highest residential elevation in the city, a tall ridge running along 1st Street. Between 1890 and 1910, well-to-do families built mansions on the North Side. Only a few are genuine mansions; the wealthiest Germans lived on the East and West Sides. Some are picturesque Queen Annes, with corner turrets and rambling floor plans. In 1984, the First Street corridor became an official historic district, listed on the National Register of Historic Places.

This area was first settled by German immigrants in the 19th century and served as a key German-American business community for Milwaukee. Daniel Richards, who started Milwaukee's first newspaper, bought a home in 1842 at 2863 N. 1st Street on 160 acres (65 ha) of land that ran from Richards Street west to between 5th and 6th and from Center Street north to Burleigh Street. The home stood until 2002. Richards Hill is located immediately north of Hadley Street between 2nd Street and Palmer, and is the location of the highest natural point in the city. Richards Hill contains thousands of perennials planted by Daniel Richards 160 years ago.

The city limits expanded to the north, reaching Center Street in 1855 and Burleigh a year later. In the 1870s, however, city residents crossed North Avenue and began to develop the former farming district. By 1900, the tide of settlement had reached near Burleigh Street. First, Second and Palmer streets (between North Avenue and Center Street) became the major "gold coast" of the North Side German community. The streets were lined with the homes of merchants, manufacturers, and professionals. Perhaps the best known was Edward Schuster, founder of what was, for decades, Milwaukee's largest department store chain. Wealthy residents organized the Millioki Club and built a lavish clubhouse at First and Wright streets. As the neighborhood filled in, its northeastern corner was developed as a large-scale industrial district.

The neighborhood remained heavily ethnic German through the 1920s, but there were signs of demographic change. Many of the new residents in the northern sections were ethnic Polish and Italian families, immigrants and their descendants who had moved across Holton Street from the Riverwest neighborhood. In the southern sections, scores of German families moved on to new neighborhoods, and the blocks above North Avenue provided homes for a variety of groups, among them African Americans. The first Black families arrived in the 1930s, during the Great Migration from the South. They moved up the Third Street corridor, establishing new churches, opening new businesses, and developing a distinct cultural presence. By 1970, African Americans were the largest group in the neighborhood. A significant number of European residents remained and there was a growing Hispanic community in the blocks just west of Holton Street.

Some sections are thoroughly mixed today, but African Americans are the major influence in the Harambee neighborhood. Juneteenth, the African-American community's largest celebration of emancipation, has been celebrated in the neighborhood on Third Street since 1972. In 1985, at the urging of local residents, the street's name was changed to celebrate Dr. Martin Luther King Jr. There have been grassroots efforts to preserve and improve the area's quality of life by working to strengthen a sense of community. The oldest grassroots organization is the Central North Community Council, established in 1960. The council's perennial president was Frank Zeidler, former mayor of Milwaukee, the last socialist to run a major U.S. city, and a neighborhood resident from 1946 until his death in 2006.

The focus on citizen involvement broadened in the early 1970s. The Center for Community Leadership Development, began to explore ways to assist the neighborhood. Using a community school as its namesake, they organized the Harambee Revitalization Project. The most novel plan called for an "in-town, new town," linking a revitalized Harambee neighborhood with a new community of transplanted North Siders outside the city.

==== Bronzeville ====
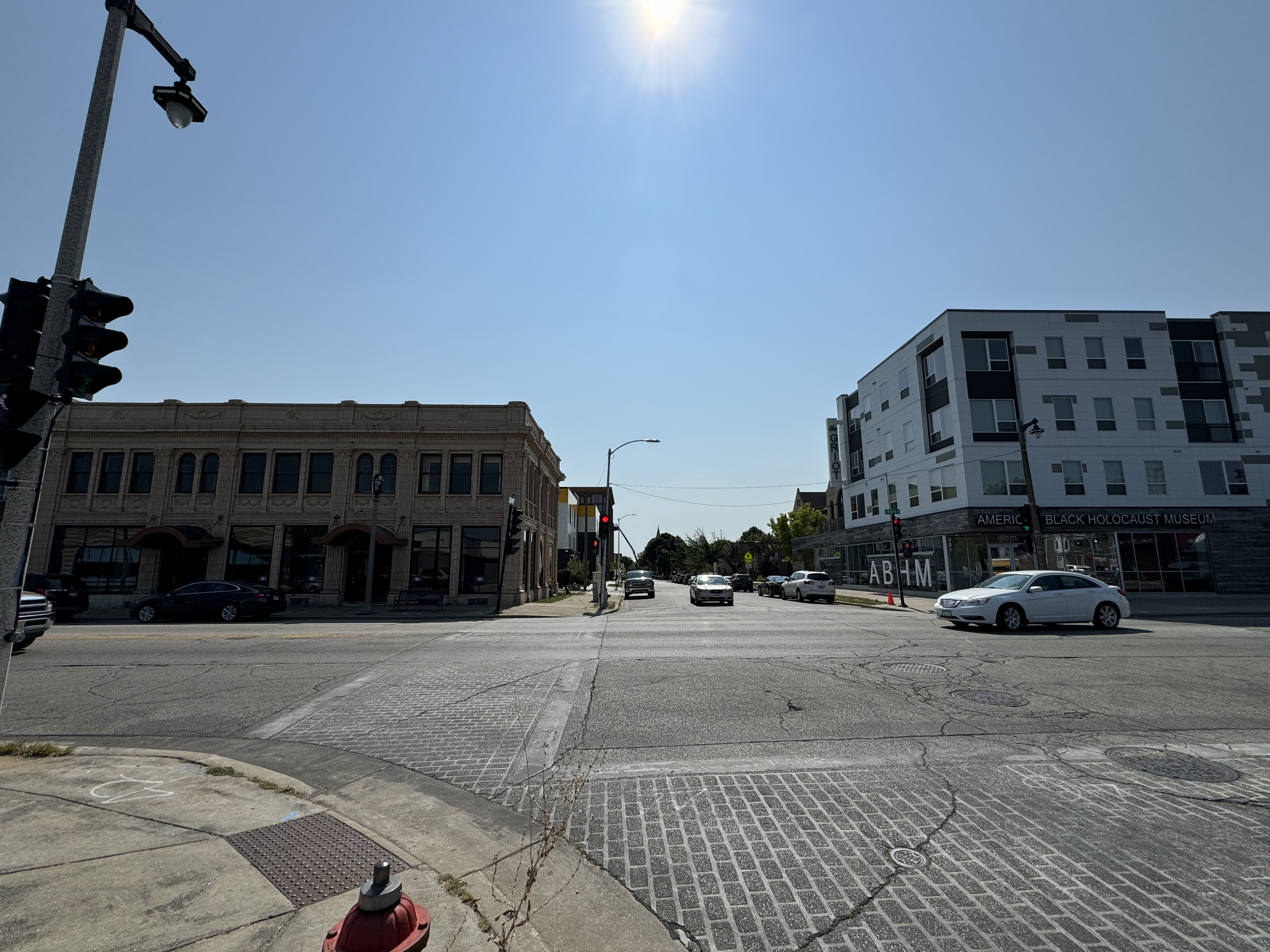
North Avenue and Vel R. Phillips Avenue, with America's Black Holocaust Museum (right)

Bronzeville is an African-American neighborhood that historically was situated between what is now the Harambee neighborhood and the North Division neighborhood. Specifically, Bronzeville was bordered by North Avenue to the north, 3rd Street to the east, State Street to the south, and 12th Street to the west. Developing and active roughly between 1900 and 1950, much of this former district was centered along Walnut Street (essentially halfway between State Street and North Avenue). It was split up by governmental condemnation and acquisition of land to construct Interstate 43 and other arterial road expansions. These changes displaced much of the community. Today, the Haymarket, Hillside, Halyard Park, and Triangle North neighborhoods make up what used to be Milwaukee's Bronzeville neighborhood.

Today, there is a rebuilding and rebranding of the commercial area of nearby North Avenue and Dr Martin Luther King Jr Drive into "Bronzeville", including many new businesses. The Black Holocaust Museum, founded by James Cameron, who survived a lynching attempt in the South, closed in 2008. After operating online, it re-opened in 2022 in a newly renovated space at the Griot Building at 411 W. North Avenue. It is managed by the Dr. James Cameron Legacy Foundation.

The name "Bronzeville" is not Milwaukee-specific. As in other cities, it was used here to refer to an area populated primarily by African Americans, reflecting their many shades of brown and bronze skin tones.

=== Havenwoods ===
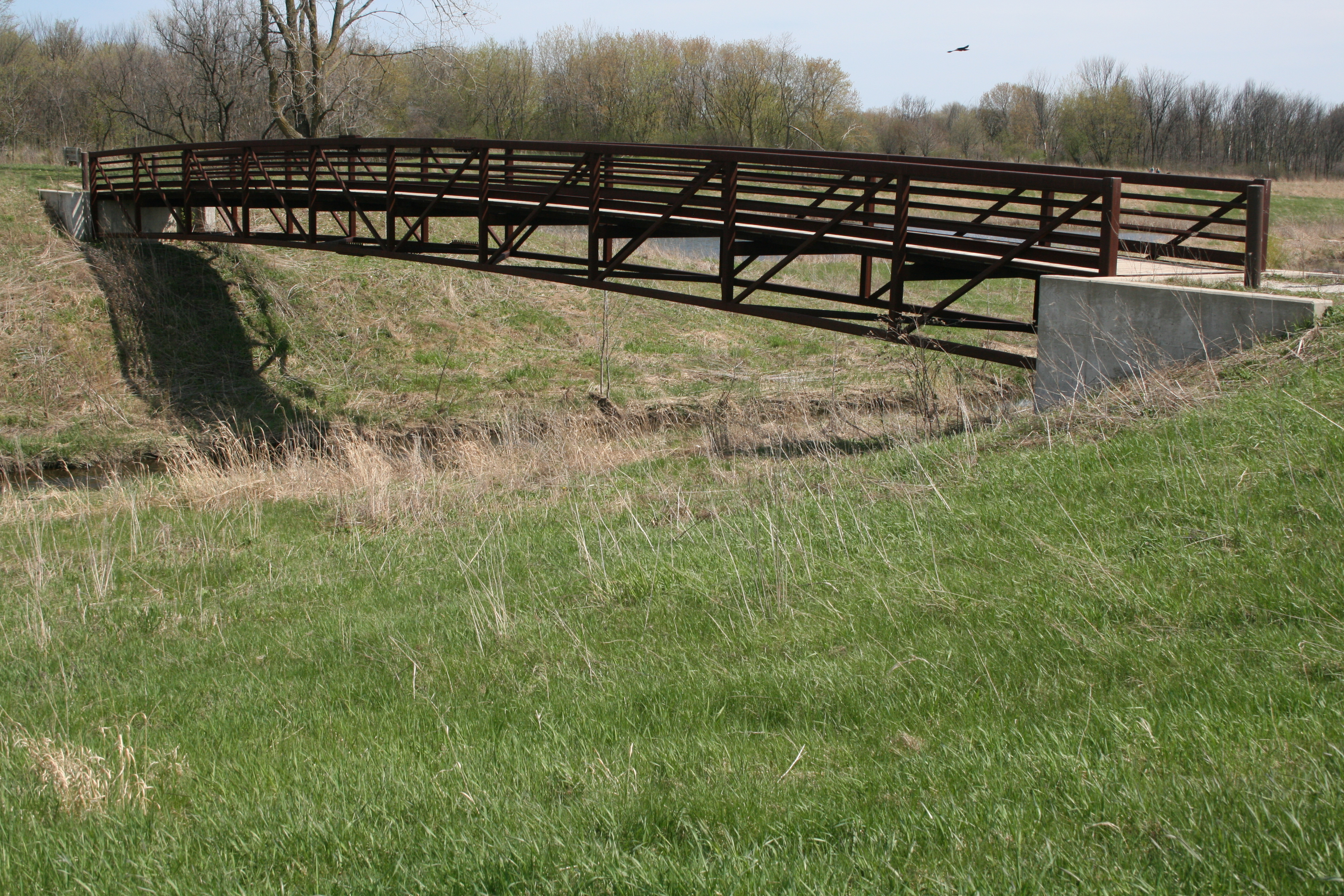
Pedestrian bridge in the Havenwoods State Forest

Havenwoods is bordered by West Mill Road to the north, North Sherman Boulevard to the east, West Silver Spring Drive to the south and 60th Street to the west. It is a working class, mostly African-American neighborhood on Milwaukee's north side, centered near Silver Spring Drive and 60th Street. The neighborhood is moderately urban in character, with a mix of strip malls, older retail buildings, and townhouses. Within the neighborhood's boundaries lie the 237-acre (960,000 m^{2}) Havenwoods State Forest and the US Army Reserve Center.

=== Hillside / Lapham Park ===
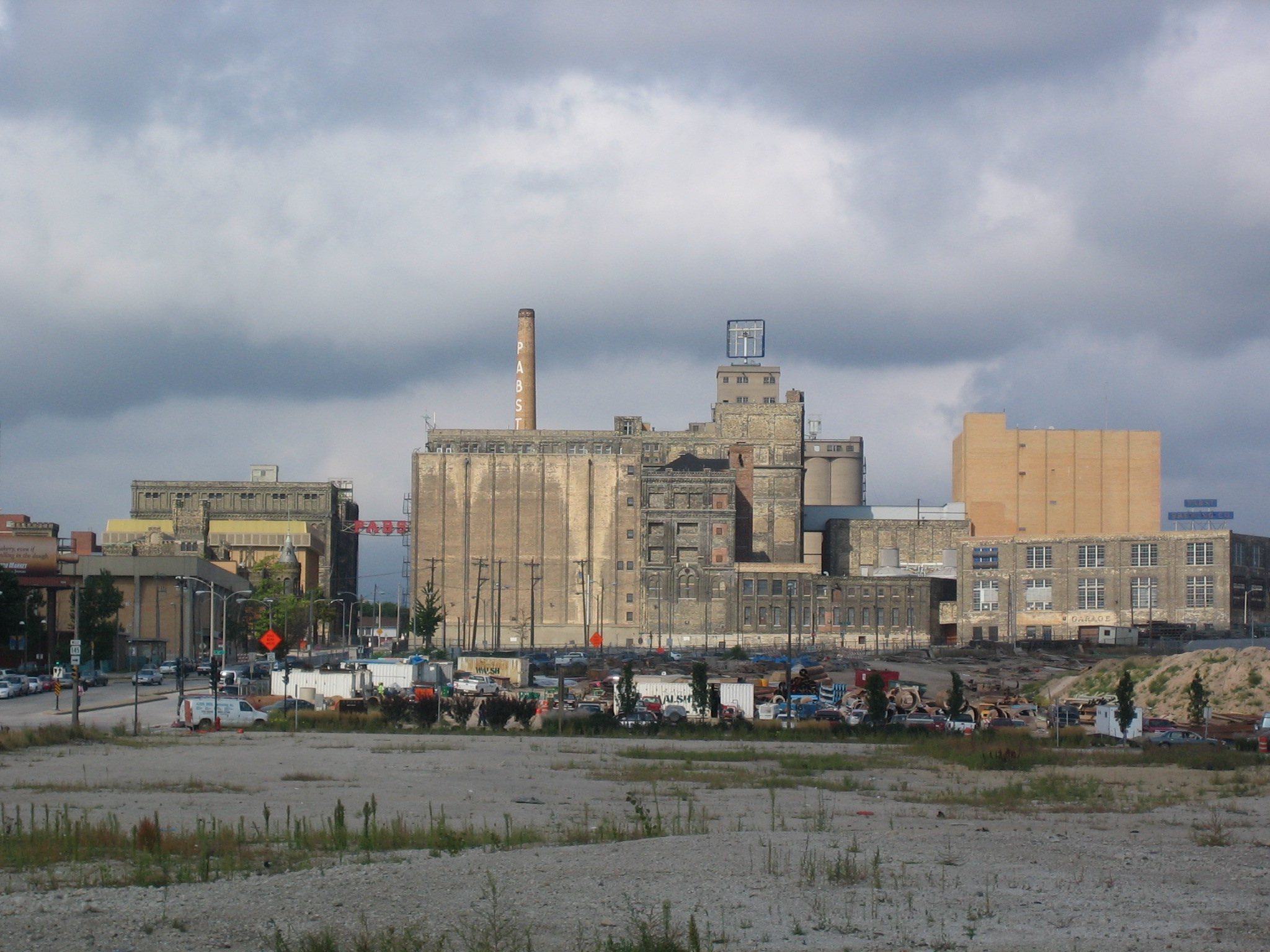
The Pabst Brewery Complex

Hillside/Lapham Park is bordered by I-43 to the north, Halyard Street and 6th Street to the east, Fond du Lac Avenue to the south, and I-43 to the west. It includes Carver Park, which was known as Lapham Park until the 1950s.

The Pabst Brewery Complex is situated in the far southwest corner of the Hillside neighborhood. The Pabst brewery was closed in 1997; however, the property is under redevelopment and speculation.

=== Metcalfe Park ===
Metcalfe Park is bordered by Center Street to the north, 20th Street to the east, North Avenue to the south and 35th Street to the west.

Metcalfe Park is often considered one of Milwaukee's most dangerous neighborhoods. It is one of the poorest; according to the U.S. Census, the poverty rate for the neighborhood and adjoining areas exceeds 60%. In 2002, after a mob of youths and children fatally beat a man, it drew national attention.

The neighborhood continues to make efforts to improve. For instance, new commercial and residential development have recently sprung up along North Avenue, a main thoroughfare. The neighborhood has many active community groups, which aim to help improve the conditions in and image of Metcalfe Park.

=== Midtown ===
Midtown is bordered by North Avenue to the north, 20th Street to the east, Highland Avenue to the south, and railroad tracks to the west. This neighborhood on Milwaukee's northwest side is still struggling to improve through commercial redevelopment and a few nonprofit organizations.

=== Amani ===
Amani is a neighborhood located on the northwest side of Milwaukee. It is bordered by Burleigh Street to the north, 20th Street to the east, North Avenue to the south, and 27th Street and railroad tracks to the west. The neighborhood was known as Park West until 2021.

=== Sherman Park ===
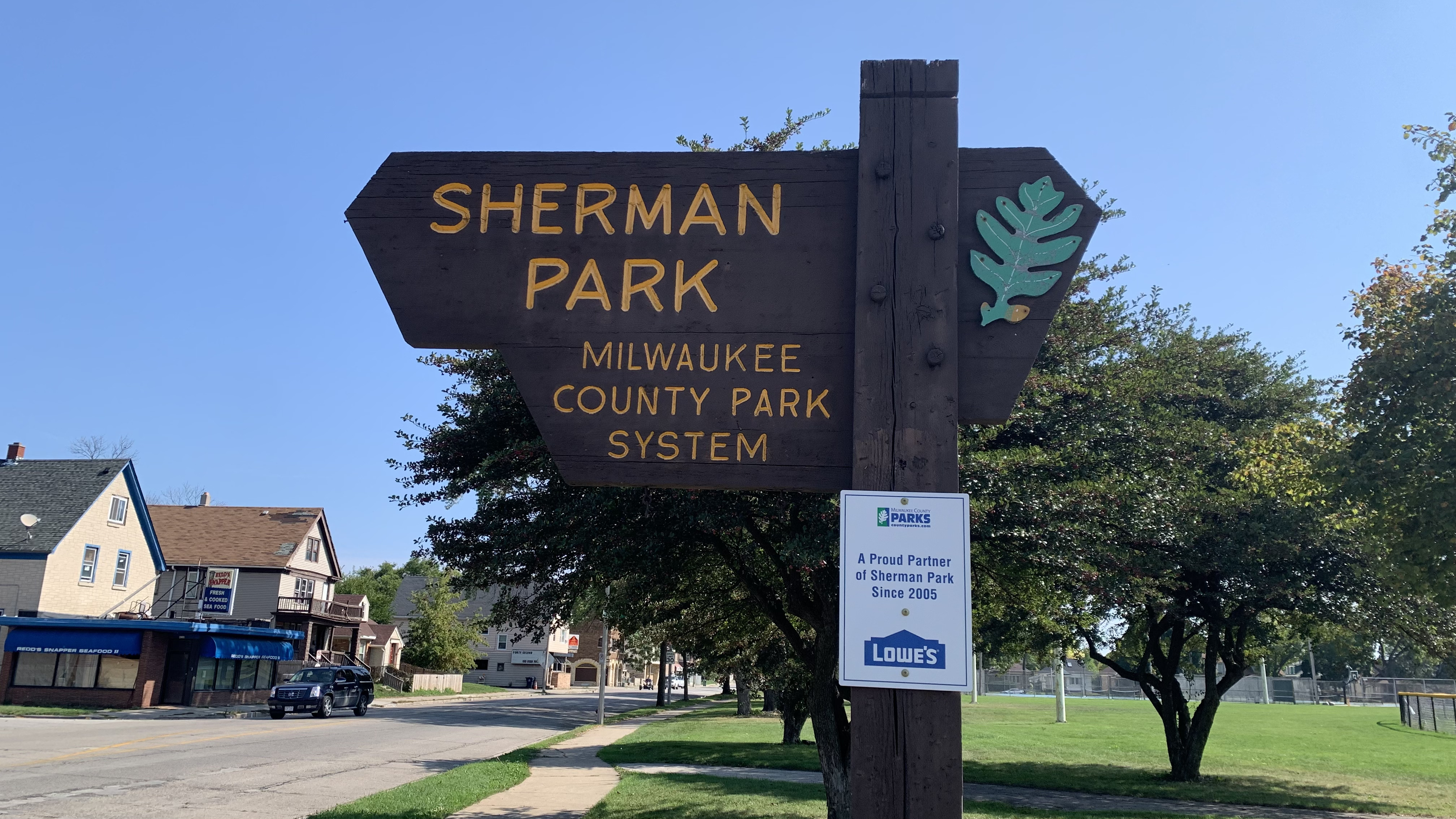
Sherman Park on W Burleigh Street and N Sherman Boulevard

Sherman Park is located on the northwest side of Milwaukee. It is bordered by Capitol Drive to the north, 35th Street to the east, North Avenue to the south and 60th Street to the west.

The Sherman Park area was once home to some of Milwaukee's first business owners. Those people built their homes in the 1920s and 1930s at the westernmost point of the city at the time. Sherman Blvd. and Grant Blvd. are streets with lavish houses.

In the summer of 2016, Sylville Smith was shot and killed by a police officer in the neighborhood, leading to rioting followed by attempts at community development, neighborhood engagement and community building. The unrest has become a catalyst for growth and a reclamation of the neighborhood's tradition of community and diversity.

Sherman Park was once the heart of Milwaukee's Jewish population. Sherman Park has a small, close-knit, and growing group of Orthodox Jews. Herb Kohl, former U.S. Senator and owner of the Milwaukee Bucks and his college roommate Bud Selig, former MLB commissioner and owner of the Milwaukee Brewers, both grew up in Sherman Park in the 1940s and attended Washington High School, which is located in the neighborhood.

The Uptown Crossing is a commercial district is located on West North Avenue and Lisbon Avenue and is a part of Sherman Park that is home to a variety of national and local retail, as well as several public institutions. Several architecturally unique buildings give Uptown Crossing an unparalleled feel, and a business improvement district and business association support the district's vitality.

=== Thurston Woods ===
Thurston Woods is a community in Milwaukee bounded by Douglas Avenue to the north, Teutonia Avenue to the east, Silver Spring Drive to the south and Sherman Boulevard to the west. Thurston Woods is known for its tree-lined streets, accessible location, and affordable homes. Havenwoods State Forest is located just across Sherman Boulevard, business and industrial neighbors lie just north of Thurston Woods along Mill Road, and retail establishments along Silver Spring Drive and Teutonia Avenue provide services for residents.

=== Williamsburg Heights ===
Williamsburg Heights is bounded by Capitol Drive to the north, Holton Street to the east, Keefe Avenue to the south and I-43 to the west. Some consider Williamsburg as a section of the newer Harambee neighborhood to the south.

In the 1800s, when memories of the frontier were still fresh in Milwaukee, the area that became Williamsburg (named for William Bogk) was a farming district. Scores of farmers, most of them German immigrants, settled in the area. Comfortably beyond the city limits, (North Avenue), they patronized their own trading center that they referred to as Williamsburg. The Green Bay road, between Burleigh Street and Keefe Avenue, was the spine of the little settlement. At its peak, Williamsburg boasted a flour mill, greenhouses, feed stores, harness shops, blacksmiths, bakeries, and its own post office.

At Port Washington Road there were a growing cluster of businesses on Green Bay Avenue – the heart of old Williamsburg. The residential sections were dotted with German saloons, German stores, and dozens of German churches. Most of the area's breadwinners were skilled artisans and tradesmen.

In 1891, Williamsburg, by then a suburban community of blue-collar workers, became part of Milwaukee. In the same decade, the Pabst Brewery purchased Schuetzen Park (presently Clinton Rose Park) and developed it as an amusement park. The beer garden remained, but the rifle range was replaced by a roller coaster, a miniature railroad, a carousel, and a fun house called Katzenjammer Castle. The area continued to grow after 1900. The tide of home-seekers washed down the ridge to Keefe Avenue before 1910 and finally reached Capitol Drive in the 1920s. Old Williamsburg became an island of older homes and shops in the heart of the neighborhood.

The homes here are dominantly bungalows, common for the 1920s, with two- and three-story Milwaukee duplexes among them. Williamsburg Heights and Williamsburg Triangle also form the primary borders and constituents of the 5 Points Neighborhood Association, Inc. (5PNA).

In the late 1960s, African Americans began to move in. Relations were more peaceful between the newer group and their older ethnic European neighbors when compared to other parts of the city. The neighborhood was quite stable through this period of change. The former Oak Club was adapted as the Shiloh Tabernacle.

== South Side ==
For many residents, Milwaukee's South Side is synonymous with the Polish immigrant community which settled here. The group's proud ethnicity maintained a high profile here for decades. In the postwar era, with newer housing being built in the suburbs, in the 1950s and 60s some well-established families began to disperse to the southern suburbs.

By 1850, there were seventy-five Poles in Milwaukee County and the US Census indicates that they had a variety of occupations: grocers, blacksmiths, tavernkeepers, coopers, butchers, broommakers, shoemakers, draymen, laborers, and farmers. Three distinct Polish communities evolved in Milwaukee, with the majority settling in the area south of Greenfield Avenue. Milwaukee County's Polish population of 30,000 in 1890 rose to 100,000 by 1915. Poles historically have had a strong national cultural and social identity, maintained through the Catholic Church. A view of Milwaukee's South Side Skyline is replete with the steeples of the many churches these immigrants built, churches that are still vital centers of the community. Milwaukee's South Side has a multi-cultural population of African Americans, Caucasians, Asian Americans and a Hispanic population made up mostly of people of Mexican and Puerto Rican backgrounds.

=== Bay View ===
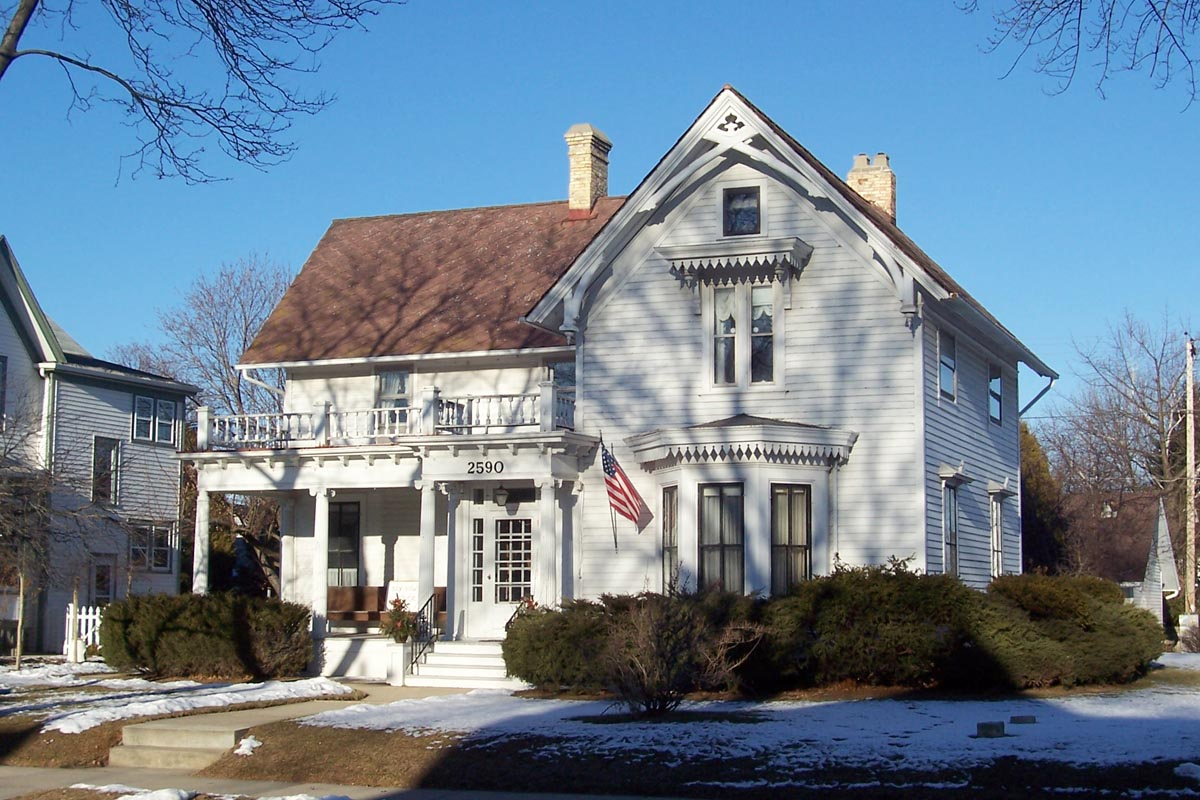
Beulah Brinton House, now used by Bay View Historical Society

Bay View is located on the southeast shore of the city of Milwaukee overlooking Lake Michigan. Bay View boundaries are Becher Street/Bay Street to the north, Lake Michigan to the east, Morgan Avenue to the south, and Sixth Street to the west. Located about 3 miles (5 km) south of downtown on the lake, Bay View originally was developed as a company town by the Milwaukee Iron Company, located near its rolling mill. It is south of Downtown and borders I-94 and I-43.

Bay View incorporated in 1879 (Milwaukee's first suburb) with 2,592 people and 892 acres (361 ha) of land; but by 1887 Bay View's 4,000 residents voted overwhelmingly to join the city of Milwaukee, mostly in order to get city services, of which water was the most important. The former village became Milwaukee's 17th ward.

Bay View is best known to labor historians as the site of the 1886 Bay View Massacre. Father James Groppi, a noted Milwaukee civil rights activist from the 1960s, was born in Bay View, where his father ran a grocery business.

In the 21st century, the neighborhood used to host the annual South Shore Water Frolics, a free three-day summer festival featured a parade, live music and fireworks, was held at South Shore Park. Today the neighborhood has the last remaining public well in the city of Milwaukee: the Pryor Avenue Iron Well.

=== Clarke Square ===
Clarke Square is home to the Mitchell Park Horticultural Conservatory and Cesar Chavez Drive, a commercial strip. Located near Menomonee Valley and tourist attractions such as Potawatomi Casino, American Family Field, and the Harley-Davidson Museum, Clarke Square is a gateway to Milwaukeeʼs Near South Side.

=== Holler Park ===
Holler Park is a medium-sized neighborhood park held by Milwaukee County containing mature old-growth oak trees and abundant wildlife, including Whitetail Deer, Raccoons, Opossums, Geese, Ducks, Great Horned Owls, Hawks and varied bird species. Because of the amount of commercial property here, it is not classified as a residential neighborhood.

=== Jackson Park ===
Jackson Park is a neighborhood on the south side, located about 6 miles (10 km) south of downtown. It is bordered by Lincoln Avenue to the north, Morgan Avenue to the south, 35th Street to the east, and 50th Street to the west. Jackson Park's architecture consists largely of two-story wood-frame houses that were constructed in the early 20th century. Jackson Park's makeup is mostly ethnic European, working middle-class, government and blue-collar workers. Since the late 20th century, an increasing number of Hispanic residents have moved here.

=== Jones Island ===
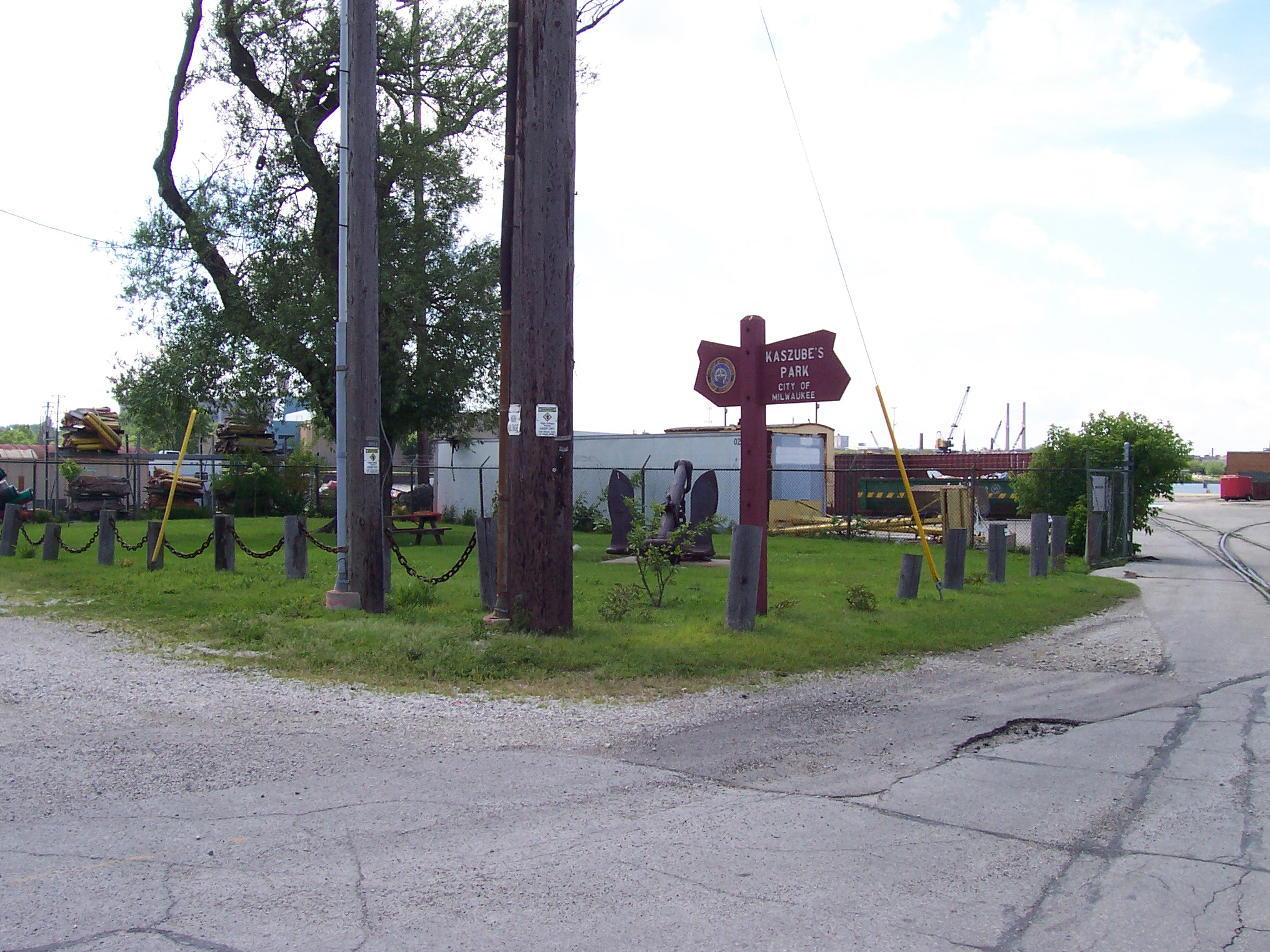
Kaszube's Park at Jones Island

Jones Island is a peninsula located at the Milwaukee Harbor. It began as a fishing village populated by Polish settlers from the Kaszub region as well as some German immigrants in 1870. The settlers made their living by fishing Lake Michigan. Having never officially obtained deeds for the land, they were considered squatters by the City of Milwaukee and evicted in the 1940s. The city developed the property for a shipping port as part of an inner harbor design.

The area is now heavily industrialized, containing only a few mature trees. Jones Island hosts much of the city's municipal services, including the Milwaukee Metropolitan Sewerage District. The area supports the Hoan Bridge and includes a shipping port, the Port of Milwaukee.

=== Layton Park ===
Layton Park is located on the city's near southwest side. The neighborhood is bordered by 35th Street in the west and by Historic Layton Boulevard to the east. Layton Park is today a diverse neighborhood with a large Latino population. The neighborhood was developed in the 1920s and comprises red brick bungalows and duplexes.

=== Lincoln Village ===
Downtown Lincoln Village.

This neighborhood is located along Lincoln Avenue between 5th and 20th streets on the south side of Milwaukee. Lincoln Village contains a national landmark, the Basilica of St. Josaphat. The Holler House tavern, which contains the oldest certified bowling alley in the United States, is located on the far west end of the neighborhood. The Historic Forest Home Cemetery is located just west, adjacent to the neighborhood.

During the early 20th century, this neighborhood was home to a large immigrant and ethnic Polish population. As they moved out, in the 21st century, the neighborhood is inhabited predominately by an ethnic Mexican population. Many have immigrated from rural areas of Mexico or moved from Los Angeles.

=== Mitchell Street ===
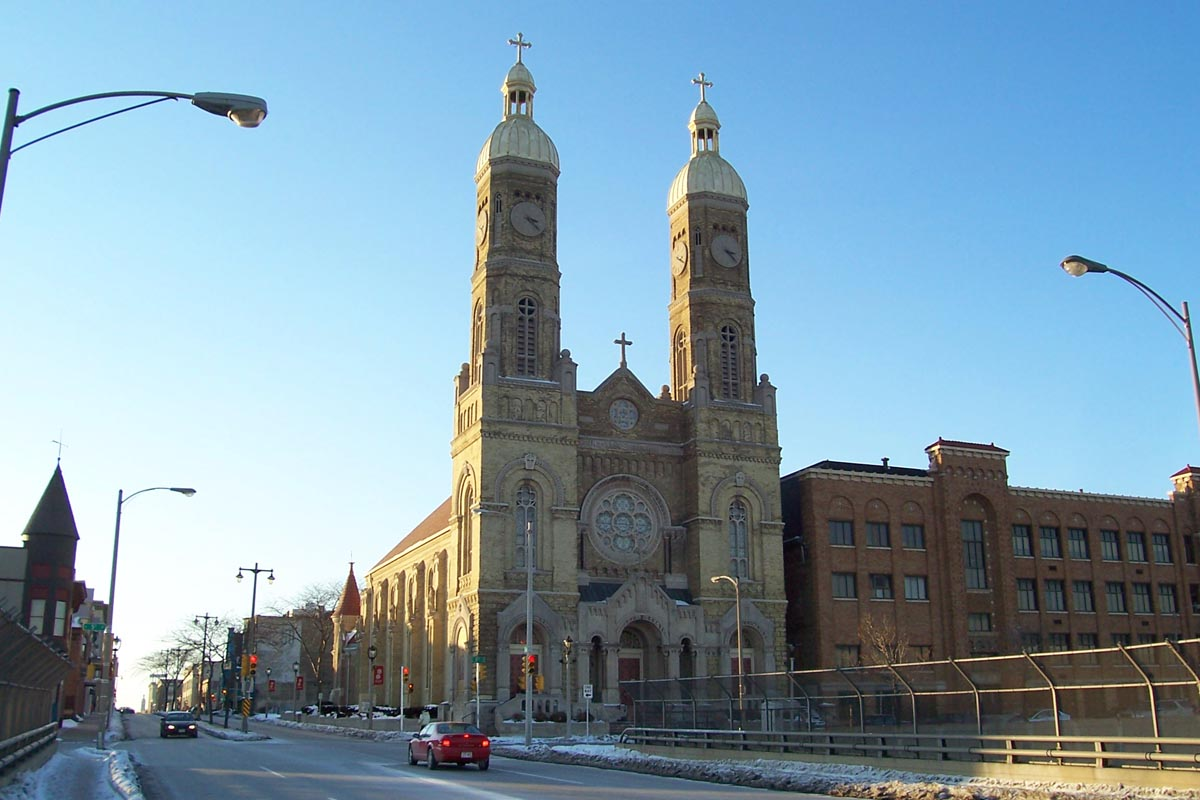
St. Stanislaus Catholic Church on Mitchell at 5th

Historic Mitchell Street is a street located about 1.5 miles (2.4 km) southwest of downtown. The Mitchell Street neighborhood is the heart of a densely populated area of Milwaukee's near south side.

A large portion of the houses in the neighborhood are two or three-story Polish flats, although the area also has a fair amount of five to six-story brick walk-ups and apartment buildings. Mitchell Street is a popular retail district.

=== Tippecanoe ===
Tippecanoe is located on the city's far south side; it is a solidly middle class and well-maintained neighborhood. Most of the neighborhood's homes date back to the 1940s and 1950s. The area was named from the political rallying cry "Tippecanoe and Tyler too" by landowner John Saveland, an outspoken local Republican. He initially developed it as an upper-income suburban community.

=== Town of Lake ===
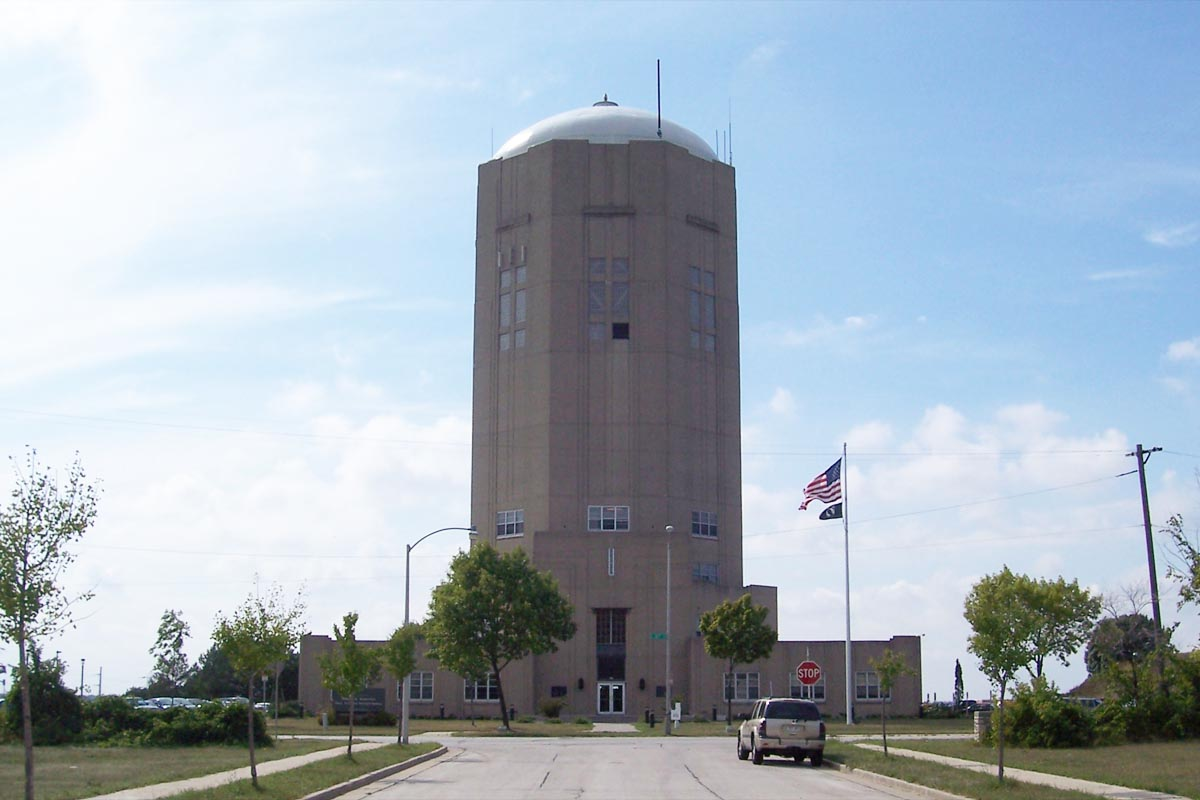
Town of Lake Water Tower

Town of Lake, located near the Mitchell airport, is a neighborhood based on its namesake township. This was established by the Territorial Legislature in 1838 and covered much of what is now the south side of Milwaukee, as well as the city of Cudahy. Over time, the township was parceled out among different area cities. The original boundaries for the Town of Lake were Greenfield Ave to the north, Lake Michigan to the east, College Ave (originally called Town Line Rd) to the south, and 27th Street to the west. In 1951, St. Francis incorporated to prevent annexation by Milwaukee, in effect "seceding" from the Town of Lake.

Before being annexed, the township's northern boundary was Howard Ave, except for a strip of land west of 20th Street going farther north to Morgan Ave. The old town hall on 6th and Howard is still referred to as the "Town of Lake Water Tower". Now officially called the Robert A. Anderson Municipal Building by the City of Milwaukee, it currently serves as office space and water treatment facility. The Town of Lake was officially annexed in 1954. The township's residents had voted not to incorporate as the "City of Lake" in 1928; had they chosen to incorporate, the remaining area of the Town of Lake would probably have never been annexed by Milwaukee, and Milwaukee would have likely expanded further west and north instead. In addition, it is also likely that the Milwaukee suburb of St. Francis would not have felt the pressure to incorporate.

=== Walker's Point ===
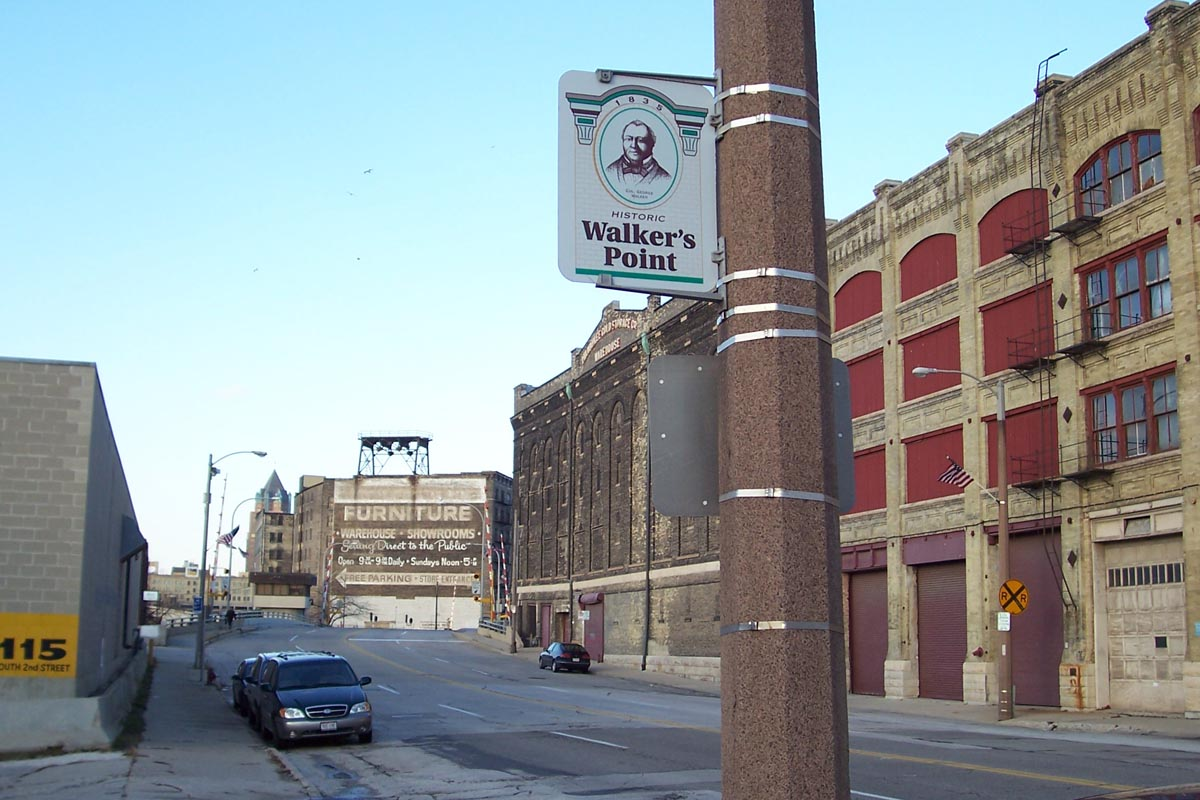
Warehouse district

Walker's Point is a neighborhood that lies south of the Third Ward and the eastern part of the Menomonee River Valley. Founded by George H. Walker in 1835 as a fur trading post, the area is now noted for being mostly an industrial neighborhood, with limited housing scattered in pockets throughout the area, particularly on the eastern end of Walker's Point.

The city's gay and lesbian community actively use the nightclubs and bars in the neighborhood. Recently, this area has seen some condo, office, and retail development spill over the Milwaukee River to this neighborhood. However, it is not displacing anyone as the spaces undergoing development have mainly been former storage or empty industrial space. There has been attempt to revamp the area. The L. Teweles Seed Company warehouse, Fifth Ward Lofts, and the Milwaukee Water Council have been renovated.

Rockwell Automation has their headquarters in this neighborhood. The Allen-Bradley Clock Tower, part of the Rockwell complex, is an icon of the neighborhood and is the world's largest four-faced clock, as listed in Guinness World Records. Esperanza Unida, a community-based nonprofit organization, is located on the western end of Walker's Point. Data security software provider and ZIP file creators PKWARE, Inc. relocated their headquarters to the neighborhood in 2014. Local architecture firm Plunkett Raysich Architects, LLP relocated from its long-time location on the northwest side to the neighborhood in May 2015.

== East Side ==
=== "The East Side" ===
The East Side is a broad area that refers to anywhere east of the Milwaukee River, north of downtown, and south of the suburb of Shorewood. This area includes Brady Street, the University of Wisconsin–Milwaukee campus, the lakefront, and the marina. The streets and buildings in this neighborhood range from towering, expensive high rises and condominiums along the lake to brownstones and walkups a few blocks inland to more affordable duplexes near the river. An economically diverse group of people live in this neighborhood. Brady Street (from Prospect to Holton) and North Avenue (from Prospect to the Milwaukee River) both feature popular, pedestrian-friendly commercial strips of nightlife, restaurants, and shops intermingled with residences. Brady Street is also known for its popular pet parade which runs every first Saturday in October. Downer Avenue (from Bradford to Park) is a similar commercial strip but with fewer bars. Milwaukee County Transit System's bus routes 30 and Green Line Express are the major north–south transit arteries for the neighborhood.

The east side is also home to renowned parks. Frederick Law Olmsted – famed designer of New York's Central Park – designed both Lake Park and Riverside Park (originally "River Park"), with Newberry Boulevard being the deliberate connector between the two. Lake Park is part of Milwaukee's Grand Necklace of Parks and is known for lawn bowling and the North Point lighthouse.

=== The Lower East Side ===
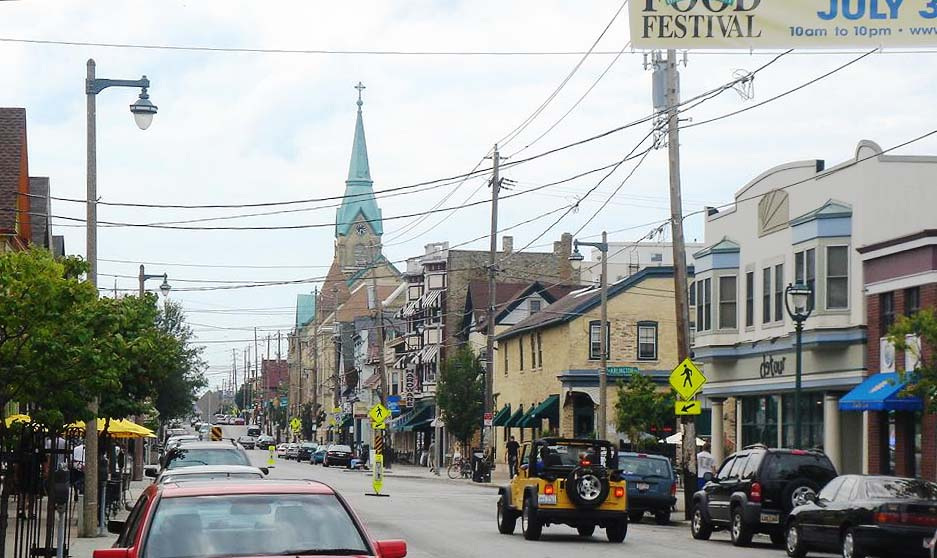
Brady Street

Lower East Side is a neighborhood North of Downtown and East of Riverwest. It is bounded by the Milwaukee River on the west, Lake Michigan on the east, North Avenue on the north and Odgen Street on the south. Brady Street itself runs west from Prospect Avenue (overlooking the Lake) to Water Street.

In the 1880s, Brady Street became a commercial district of Yankee and German owned shops. Regano's Roman Coin, one of the original Pabst tied house taverns, is still located on Brady Street, though the vintaged beer signs outside read "Blatz". This tavern was built in 1890 and is unique in that it was designed by architect Otto Strack, who also designed Milwaukee's Pabst Theater. Today, Lower East Side is filled with coffee houses, nightclubs, restaurants, vintage clothing, and thrift stores.

Lower East Side is often associated with being once the heart of Milwaukee's Italian community, even being called "Milwaukee's Little Italy". But before World War II, it was largely home to Polish immigrants. In fact, historic St. Hedwig's Roman Catholic Church, a long-time Polish church, which was built in 1871, stands at the corner of Brady Street and Humboldt Avenue. In the 1960s, Italians and other assimilated groups began to leave the neighborhood for the suburbs, while the hippies and other bohemians moved in. The 1980s saw blight, neglect and decay, but now the area has been revitalized and has become a model for New Urbanism. Starting in the late 1990s, most of the bohemian population moved to Riverwest and Bay View. But this neighborhood still exhibits a strong, albeit upscale, independent flair.

=== Riverwest ===
Main page: Riverwest (Milwaukee)

Riverwest (Milwaukee) is a primarily residential neighborhood located west of the Milwaukee River and east of Holton Street, situated south of Estabrook Park, between Milwaukee's East Side, Brewers' Hill, Williamsburg Heights, and Harambee neighborhoods. Its borders are Capitol Drive to the north, the Milwaukee River to the east, North Avenue to the south and Holton Street to the west. The main east–west arterial streets – Capitol Drive, Locust Street, and North Avenue – connect Riverwest to the East Side via bridges. The main north–south arterial streets – Holton Street and Humboldt Boulevard – connect Riverwest to the downtown area, the lower East Side (specifically Brady Street), and suburban Shorewood. Along with those streets, Locust, Center, and Burleigh Streets are the major east–west corridors with cafes, bars, and shops where people congregate. Riverwest is one of the neighborhoods that established its boundaries and identity before the 1990s Neighborhood Identification Project, receiving the designation in 1978.

== West Side ==
=== Avenues West ===
Avenues West is an area west of Milwaukee's downtown. It is bordered by Interstate 43 on the east, 27th Street on the west, Interstate 94 on the south, and on the north by Highland Avenue. In decades past this neighborhood has been one of low income levels and property values. It was also home to Jeffrey Dahmer, a notorious serial killer who murdered several of his victims at his apartment in the neighborhood. It has begun more recently to see some signs of redevelopment. The most commonly cited example being the Ambassador Hotel that, until recently, was linked with drug dealing and prostitution and has since been restored to an upscale establishment. Prostitution, although not quite as prevalent as it was in the 2000s is still a concern in the Avenues West area. In an attempt to help control crime in this area, Marquette University went so far as to provide a small additional station for the Milwaukee Police Department's 3rd District, fittingly named "Avenues West". Other notable places in the area include Marquette University, the Milwaukee Rescue Mission, the Pabst Mansion, the Joseph B. Kalvelage House and the Rave/Eagles Ballroom. The western portion of the neighborhood along 27th Street has been recently dubbed SoHi (i.e., South of Highland Boulevard) by the business owners to help jumpstart the area.

On May 18, 2006, a construction worker unearthed human remains in the neighborhood believed to be the location of Milwaukee's first cemetery established in the First Ward (known as the "Old Cemetery") near 22nd and Michigan. Thirteen burials have since been identified, and archaeologists are unsure if they are remnants from the Old Cemetery or an earlier burial site used by a Potawatomi village.

==== University Hill ====
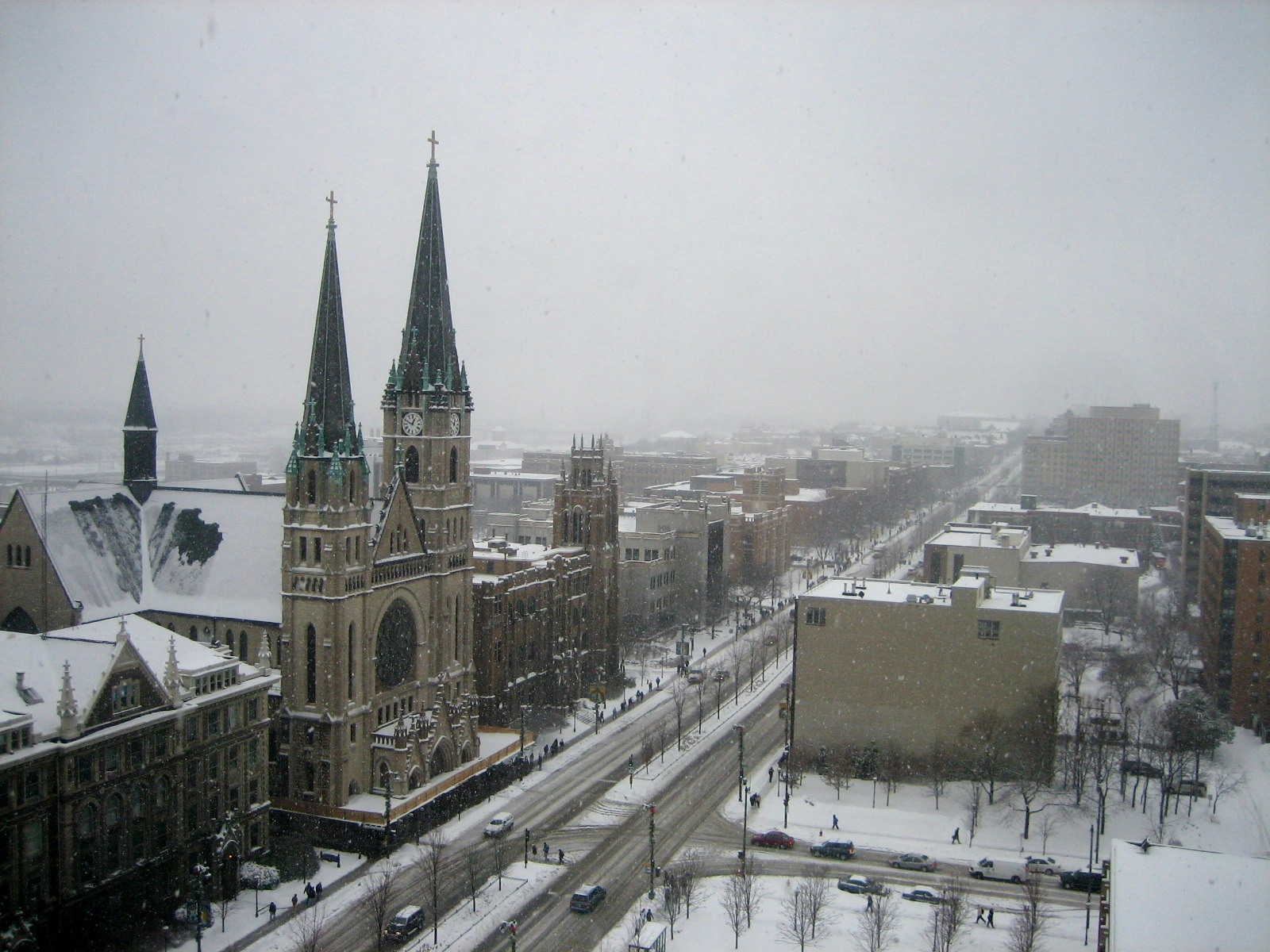
Looking west along W Wisconsin, with Gesu Church visible

University Hill (or simply Marquette) is a campus neighborhood, generally combined with the Avenues West neighborhood (since it is within), that, as its name implies, is home to the Marquette University campus. The neighborhood encompasses 93-acre (380,000 m^{2}) from 9th Street on the east, to 20th Street on the west, and from Wells Street on the north, to Clybourn Street on the south. Wisconsin Avenue, a major thoroughfare in Milwaukee, bisects the campus neighborhood. The neighborhood is positioned adjacent northwest and partially northeast of the Marquette Interchange, which was named so because of its proximity to Marquette University. Lake Michigan is roughly one mile east of the neighborhood. Gesu Church is located within the campus' urban setting, but is not affiliated with the university. The area was at one time the site of the Wisconsin State Fairgrounds.

=== Cold Spring Park ===
Cold Spring Park is a small neighborhood near the Miller Brewing Company on the city's west side. Cold Spring Park has been around since the mid-19th century. It is named for a natural spring that was found in the northwest corner of the neighborhood (then bounded by 27th Street, 35th Street, West Juneau Avenue, and Vliet Street). As far as crime, Cold Spring Park is a rather calm area, as opposed to other nearby sections of Milwaukee.

In 1852, Cold Spring Park was the site of the Wisconsin State Agricultural Society fair and exhibition. During the American Civil War, Cold Spring Park became Camp Washburn, housing the 2nd Cavalry, 30th Infantry, and the 39th Regiment. After the Civil War, Cold Spring Park once again became a race track. A race that was commemorated by Currier and Ives depicted an 1871 record breaking race by the mare Goldsmith Maid, with a time of 2 minutes and 17 seconds.

Adjacent to Cold Spring Park was the Cold Spring House, a hotel which housed visitors and drivers for the races. It was notorious for its gambling, cockfights, courtesans and dances. At the close of the 19th century, Milwaukee saw a population boom, prompting two new streets in Cold Spring Park; Highland Boulevard (1896) and McKinley Boulevard (1906).

Cold Spring Park initially drew German-American residents of the moderate to upper income scale. The upper end residing primarily on Highland and McKinley. Highland Boulevard, Juneau Avenue, and McKinley Boulevard are designated as historical streets by the City of Milwaukee.

=== Historic Concordia District ===
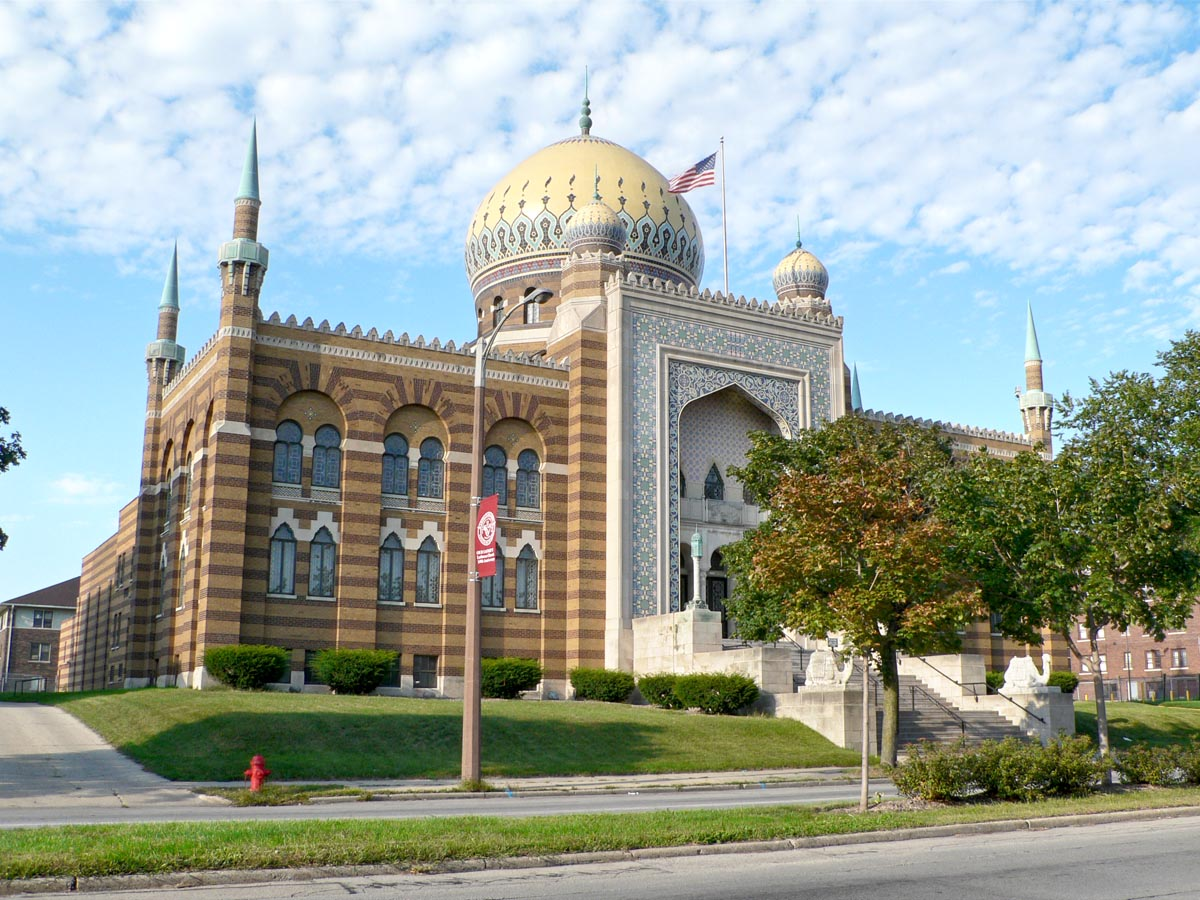
Tripoli Shrine Temple on Wisconsin at 30th

Historic Concordia District is an area between 27th Street, 35th St, Wisconsin Avenue, and Highland Boulevard on Milwaukee's near west side. It is the home of both a local historic district and many nationally registered historic properties, such as the Tripoli Shrine Temple. Many Victorian homes in the neighborhood have been converted into bed and breakfasts. Notable homes include the 1850s Tower House and 1860s Col. Theodore Yates residence. Several private residences are opened to the public each year on the Saturday of Fathers Day weekend for a home tour by Historic Concordia Neighbors Inc.

Concordia College (now known as Concordia University) was located in the neighborhood for 100 years, until 1983. The college's former facilities, between 31st and 33rd streets and State St. and Highland Blvd., are now home to the Indian Community School.

=== Enderis Park ===
The Enderis Park neighborhood is a primarily residential neighborhood bounded by North 76th Street, North 60th Street, West Center Street, and Burleigh/Lisbon Avenue. Many houses date from the 1930s and 1940s. The geographic and cultural heart of the neighborhood is the Enderis Playfield, named for Dorothy Enderis, a public recreation pioneer who retired as an assistant superintendent in the Milwaukee Public Schools teacher in 1948. In 2006, neighbors rallied to rejuvenate the park, which had fallen into disrepair. Magic Grove, a monumental steel sculpture by Wisconsin artist Nancy Metz White, was installed, providing a community gathering place in the park.

=== Grantosa Heights ===
Located between Granville and Wauwatosa, Grantosa Heights is a highly urban neighborhood with a diverse population. This is a lower middle class area with predominantly African-American and Laotian residents. The neighborhood is named after Grantosa Drive, which seems to be the border with Midtown. Much of the architecture consists of tract homes from the 1950s and 1960s. In recent years, this neighborhood has become home to many of the refugees that have fled Laos.

=== Kops Park ===
Kops Park is bordered by North 92nd Street to the west, West Burleigh Street to the south, West Lisbon Avenue to the north, and North 76th Street to the east. The neighborhood is centered around Kops Park, named after Gerald Henry Kops, a Milwaukee County Supervisor.

=== Martin Drive ===
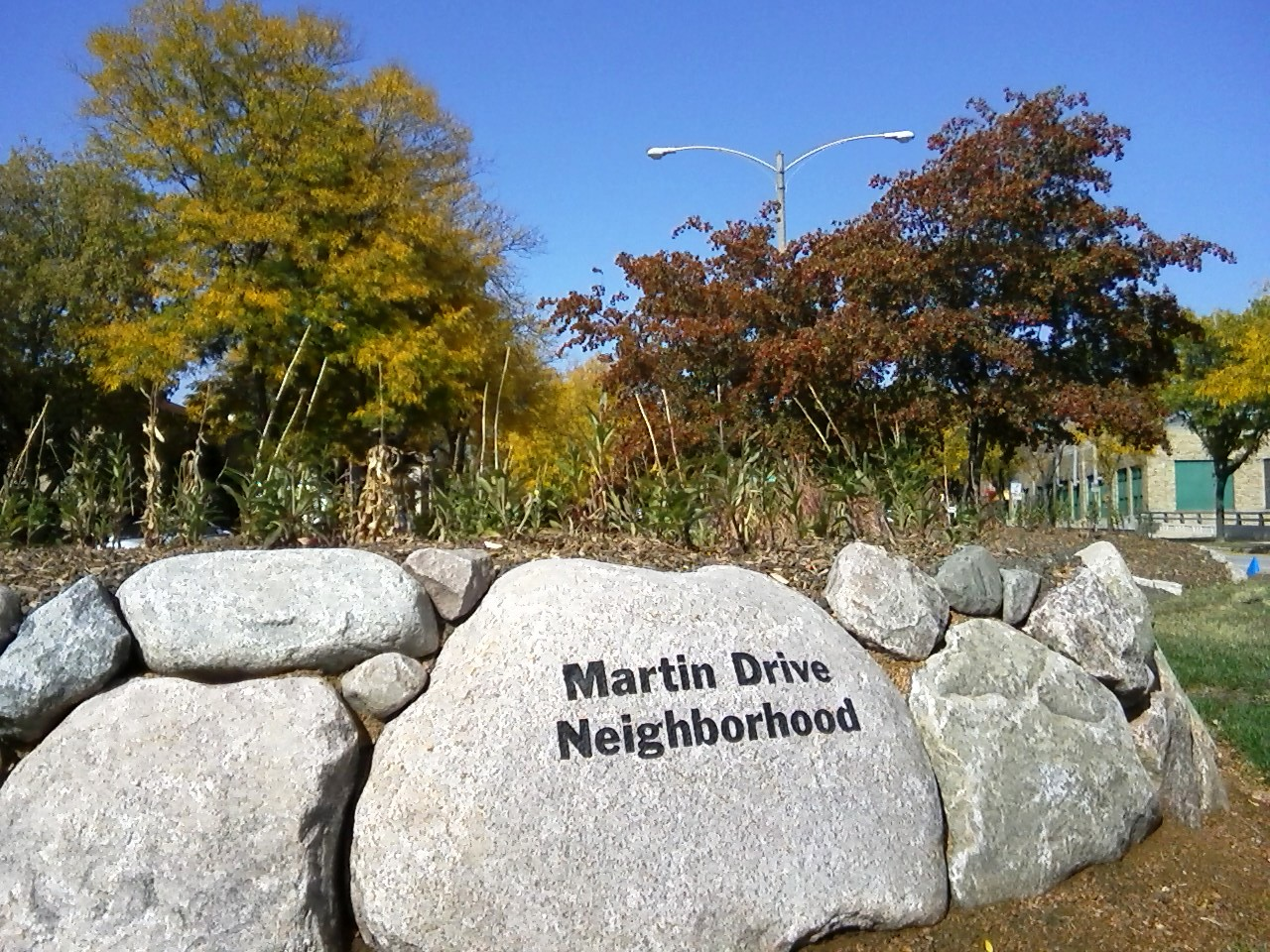
Boulevard Stone

The Martin Drive neighborhood is located on the city's west side. The neighborhood is located north and west of Miller Brewing Company. It includes Harley-Davidson and the Highland Avenue Viaduct. The neighborhood was built up in the 1920s and is home to several old apartment buildings. The neighborhood has retained its density and is still one of the safest neighborhoods in the city. Martin Drive is bordered by Martin Drive in the south, 35th Street in the east, Vliet Street in the north, and WIS 175 in the west. Milwaukee's Washington Park is located adjacent, just north of the neighborhood.

After several decades of stagnant growth the neighborhood is now seeing redevelopment with a few new businesses and building renovations. As such, the neighborhood supports many small and upstart businesses such as Eat Cake, Milwaukee Nut Company, a law office and State Street Animal Hospital among others. Martin Drive has several private and public schools nearby. Grocery stores, hardware stores and pharmacies are in close proximity to the Martin Drive Neighborhood. The neighborhood has a strong and dedicated volunteer-led neighborhood association, the Martin Drive Neighborhood Association.

=== Merrill Park ===
Merrill Park is a residential neighborhood east of Piggsville. Its traditional boundaries are 27th Street on the east, 35th Street on the west, Wisconsin Avenue on the north, and the Menomonee Valley on the south. Traditionally an Irish-American enclave, it is now an ethnically diverse neighborhood. There is little in the way of commerce in Merrill Park, largely confined to the boundary streets, which are major arterials.

Merrill Park was an early home to Milwaukee's Irish community. Many Irish settled in Merrill Park along with the rest of the west side of Milwaukee. The southern portion of the neighborhood was demolished in the 1950s in order to build Interstate 94. The 1960s brought on several redevelopment projects including streetscaping, new homes, and a new public housing tower. Marquette University High School has stayed in the neighborhood and has invested heavily in improving its campus and the surrounding neighborhood.

The neighborhood is seeing major physical improvements. Several new homes have been built on former vacant lots. Several old homes have been purchased and renovated. The Wisconsin Humane Society has made this neighborhood its primary location. Marquette University High School is undergoing a multimillion-dollar renovation and construction project as well.

==== Piggsville ====
Piggsville is a small residential enclave, four blocks by six blocks, at the west end of the Menomonee River Valley, south of Miller Brewing and the Wisconsin Avenue viaduct, and north of Interstate 94. Known as Pigsville during the depression era as pigs were brought into the butchering yards at that location. It is also known as Valley Park, and its neighborhood association is the Valley Park Civic Association. Most of its homes were built in the early 20th century. The area was annexed by the City of Milwaukee in 1925 after petition by its residents. Flooding has been a problem because of its river valley location, and a new concrete retaining wall was built in 2000.

=== Mount Mary ===
Mount Mary surrounds Mount Mary University. It is bordered by Concordia Ave. on the north, 89th St. on the east, Center St. on the south and Menomonee River Parkway on the west. With several curvilinear streets and fewer sidewalks, it resembles a suburban neighborhood. Most of the homes were built in the 1950s. The City of Wauwatosa is to the south and to the west. Milwaukee County Kops and Cooper Parks also border this neighborhood. Portions are also named Golden Valley which is composed of 1950s tract homes built primarily by Welbilt Homes and Corrigan Builders.

=== Story Hill ===
Story Hill is a neighborhood located directly north of American Family Field and south of the Washington Heights neighborhood, on the west side of Milwaukee. Story Hill is named for Hiram Story. Hiram, along with his brother Horace, founded a quarry on the land in this neighborhood. The neighborhood itself lies on a hill just south of Wisconsin Avenue and is characterized by quiet, tree-lined streets and an isolated feel, in sharp contrast to the busier and more depressed neighborhoods that surround it.

Story Hill was developed in the 1920s as a sanctuary for middle class Milwaukeeans living just east toward downtown, in the once affluent Concordia district. Demand for larger lots and a more suburban feel fueled the development of Story Hill. The housing stock consists of ornate early 20th-century houses, usually made of brick.

=== Walnut Hill ===
Walnut Hill is a predominantly African-American neighborhood on the west side, bordered by 27th Street, 35th Street, Vliet Street, and North Avenue. There is also a strong southeast Asian (Hmong) presence here. The neighborhood is one of the most blighted in the city. Parts of the neighborhood include streets without homes and large vacant lots. Despite severe problems in the neighborhood, several homes are under construction and some middle-income proposals are beginning to be seen.

=== Washington Heights ===
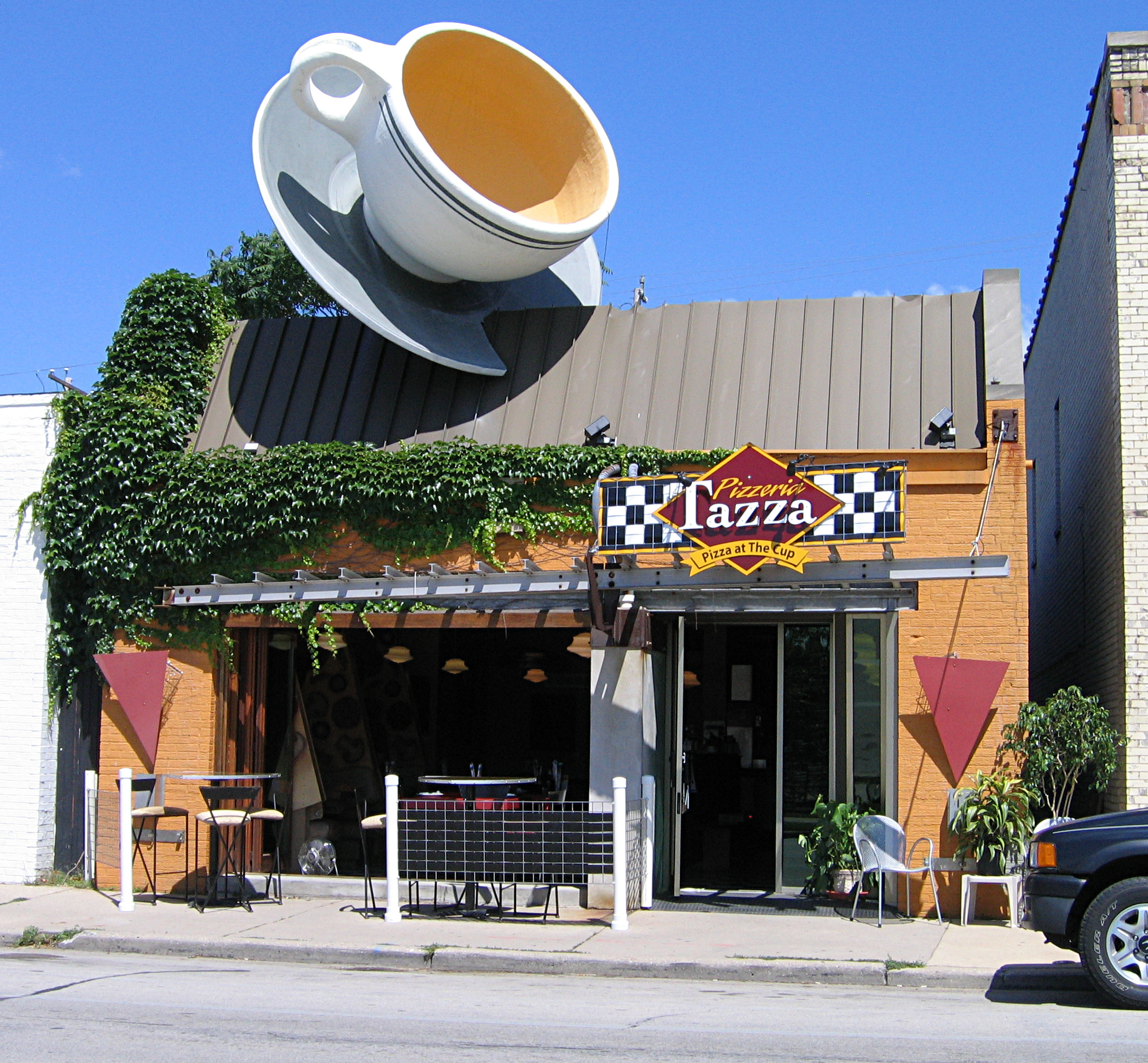
The Cup on W Vliet by 50th

Washington Heights is a neighborhood characterized by its 1920s Arts and Crafts housing stock. The boundaries of Washington Heights are 60th St. on the west, North Ave. on the north, 47th St. and Washington Park on the east, and Vliet St. on the south. Washington Heights should not be confused with The Washington Highlands, a neighborhood on the other side of 60th St., in Wauwatosa, a suburb of Milwaukee.

St. James Evangelical Lutheran Church is a prominent congregation in the area, dating back to the 1920s. Mount Olive Lutheran Church and School situated across the street from Saint Sebastian Catholic Church and School, built respectively in the 1920s and 1930s, at North 54th Street and Washington Boulevard, are large congregations which both serve as strong cornerstones within the neighborhood. There has been significant business growth along its Vliet Street corridor, with many new art galleries, wine shops and restaurants. One business, a long time coffee shop recently turned pizzeria, is unique in that it has a large coffee cup on the roof. The central administrative office building of Milwaukee Public Schools is located in this neighborhood.

Washington Heights, a neighborhood that advertises itself as, "In the City — Out of the Ordinary!" lies along Milwaukee's western border. While the neighborhood is now only minutes from downtown and close urban amenities, this area was once considered remote.

Development of the area began in 1838 when the federal government gave a parcel of land to the Wisconsin Territory. The land was intended for a canal that would connect the Rock River to Lake Michigan, but the venture quickly failed. The land was sold to private investors.

In 1839, roughly two-thirds of what is now known as Washington Heights was purchased by George Dousman and turned into an immense farm. In addition to its agricultural operation, the Dousman family founded the Ne-Ska-Ra Mineral Springs Company, which sold bottled water from a spring on their property. Today an elementary school named Neeskara occupies the land where the spring flowed. Later, the Dousman land was sold in several parcels between the 1880s and the 1920s.

Early settlement of the area owed much to two major 19th Century projects — the extension of the streetcar line to Wauwatosa and the construction of Washington Park.

Between 2000 and 2020, the neighborhood's population fell, even as the number of households remained steady, due to a decrease in the average household size.

The area has a neighborhood organization, the Washington Heights Neighborhood Association.

=== Washington Park ===
Washington Park is located on Milwaukee's West Side and is bordered by 35th street in the east, US-41 in the west, Vilet Street in the south and North Avenue in the north. Sherman Boulevard and Lisbon Avenue run through the neighborhood. Sherman Boulevard is lined with large brick homes and old trees. In the 1950s, Lisbon was a major business street, today though, with a rise in prostitution and the crime that comes with prostitution, it is home to several vacant storefronts. The neighborhood is now settled by a majority African American population.

Washington Park, (originally West Park), a 128.5-acre (520,000 m^{2}) focal point and namesake of the neighborhood, was designed by Frederick Law Olmsted, famed designer of New York's Central Park, and built in 1891. The Milwaukee County Zoo started in this neighborhood in 1892 as the "West Park Zoological Gardens," a small mammal and bird exhibit in the West Park barn.

On September 20, 1900, the West Park was renamed Washington Park and the zoo followed suit by renaming to Washington Park Zoo. The zoo was relocated to its present location when Washington Park lost an 18-acre (73,000 m^{2}) parcel of park property for the freeway expansion in the early 1960s. Ice skating and regular outdoor concerts occurred in Washington Park up until the early 1970s. Today, the park houses an amphitheatre and pool. In 2007, Milwaukee's Urban Ecology Center (headquartered in Riverside Park on the East Side) opened at satellite center in the park in an effort to help rejuvenate the run-down green space and provide interactive programming of nature to local youth.

At the intersection of Lisbon and Sherman, the heart of the neighborhood, stands an equestrian statue of Friedrich Wilhelm von Steuben, a German general who assisted George Washington in the American Revolutionary War. Across from this traffic circle stands the new Washington Park Library, which has replaced the old Boulevard Inn, which burned down in the 1990s.

== Downtown ==
=== East Town ===
The East Town neighborhood encompasses the eastern portion of downtown Milwaukee's central business district from the Milwaukee River on the west to Lake Michigan on the east, and from Ogden Avenue (i.e., the lower East Side) on the north to Clybourn (i.e., the Third Ward) on the south.

Yankee Hill is a key part of the East Town neighborhood, being situated within East Town's boundaries, but closer to the lake and north of downtown. The East Town area also contains the historic Juneau Town settlement, which had competed with the neighboring Kilbourn Town (present-day Westown) for people and resources. With the Milwaukee River as the division, these two "towns" have remarkably different feels. East Town has dense, narrower streets and a more intimate feel, whereas Westown has broad, vast streets with older buildings.

The buildings in East Town are newer. The modern skyscrapers of the Northwestern Mutual Life complex and Milwaukee's tallest building, the U.S. Bank Center, as well as the city's four other tallest buildings, dominate the eastern portion of the neighborhood. Other noteworthy buildings include the Chase Bank building, the Wisconsin Gas Building, the Faison building, and the Morgan Stanley building. Two large condominium developments, Kilbourn Tower and University Club tower, have been recently completed in the northern half of the neighborhood. Both buildings are over 32 stories tall and have multimillion-dollar penthouse units.

The neighborhood also contains the Cathedral of St. John the Evangelist and Old St. Mary's Church which have survived from the early days of Milwaukee. The East Town neighborhood association hosts Jazz in the Park, an outdoor music concert series at Cathedral Square Park. The area has become the center of Milwaukee nightlife featuring several trendy nightclubs, and outdoor upscale eateries. In summer, East Town sponsors the Parisian festival Bastille Days and in winter the Holiday City of Lights. The Milwaukee School of Engineering campus is also located in this neighborhood.

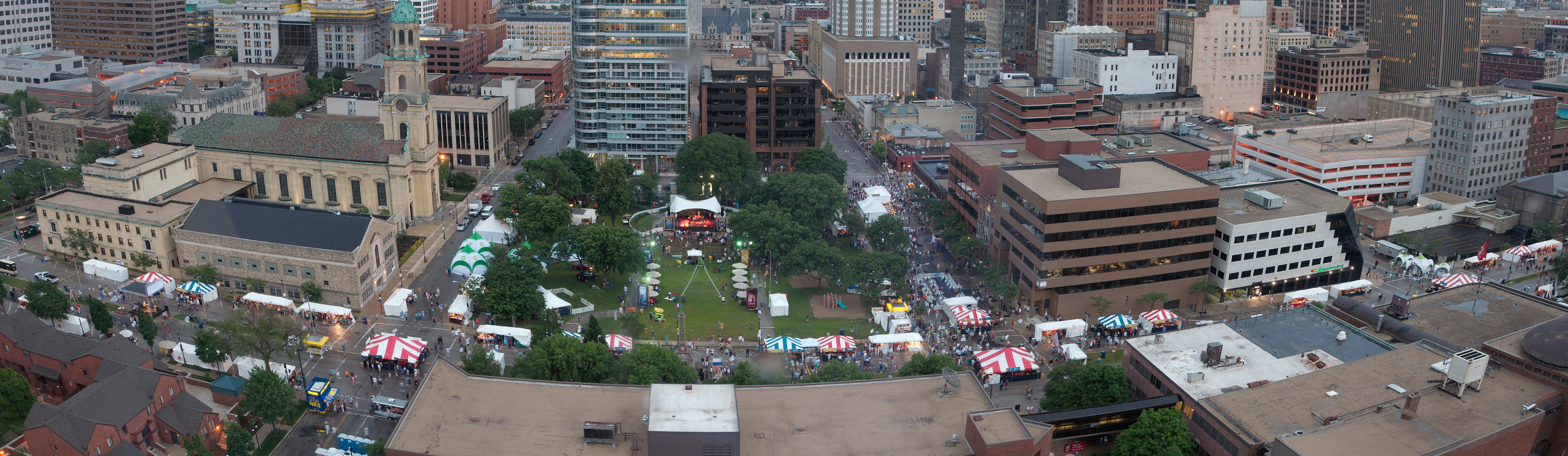
Neighborhood during Bastille Days, facing south toward downtown; Cathedral of St. John the Evangelist on the left.

=== Menomonee River Valley ===
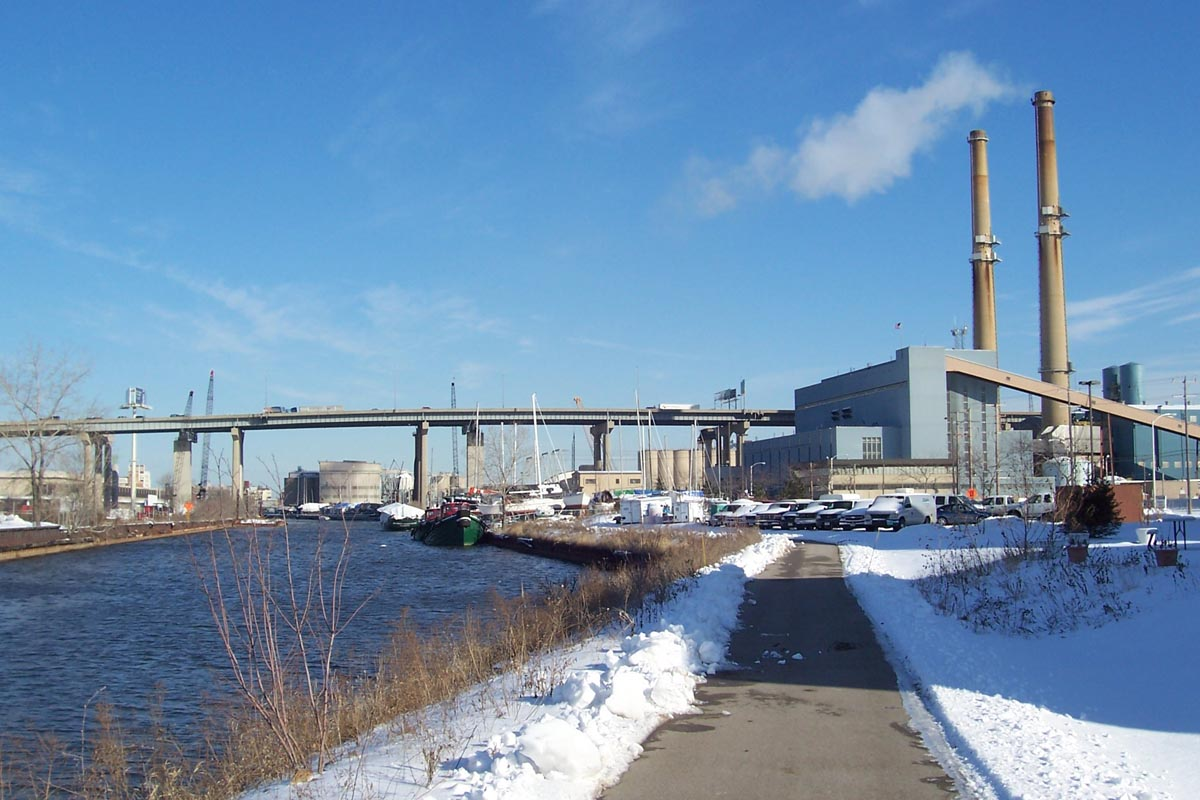
The Hank Aaron State Trail in the Valley

The Menomonee Valley was once the industrial heart of the city of Milwaukee, employing thousands of people in heavy industry and railroading. Despite decades of decline, the Valley is still home to several manufacturers, the Potawatomi Casino, and American Family Field, the home field of the Milwaukee Brewers. The Menomonee Valley is also home to the Harley-Davidson Museum, which opened in July 2008.

Redevelopment in the Menomonee Valley has added thousands of jobs and transformed once-blighted former industrial land into parkland and community gathering space. In 2007, the Sierra Club recognized the Menomonee Valley as a national example of environmentally friendly urban renewal.

=== Historic Third Ward ===
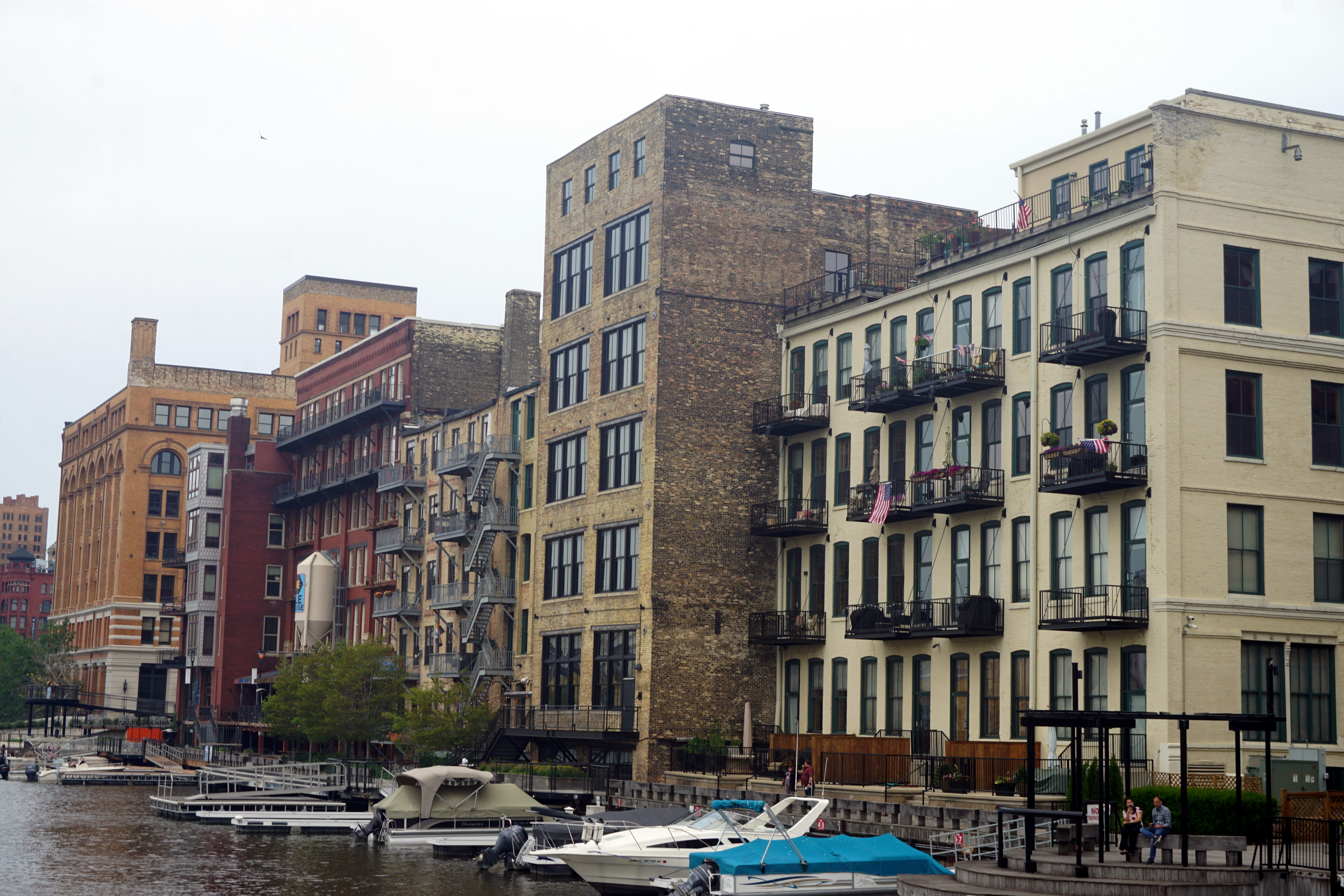
Historic Third Ward buildings from the Milwaukee River

Once home to Irish, and then, Italian immigrants, the Historic Third Ward, located just south of downtown, is now an upper-class neighborhood. The Third Ward is noted for a large number of condominium and loft apartments, antique stores, boutiques and art galleries. Access to Milwaukee's Maier Festival Grounds, best known for Summerfest, can be obtained from through this neighborhood. It is home to the Milwaukee Institute of Art & Design, ComedySportz, and it is also a center of Milwaukee's gay and lesbian community. Located just west of this now trendy neighborhood of nightclubs and outdoor "River Walk" restaurants, is Milwaukee's main transportation hub and the Milwaukee Intermodal Station, which services Amtrak, Greyhound Bus Lines, and Badger Bus.

The neighborhood is referred to as the Historic Third Ward since redistricting over the years currently has the area in the fourth (political) ward.

=== Westown ===
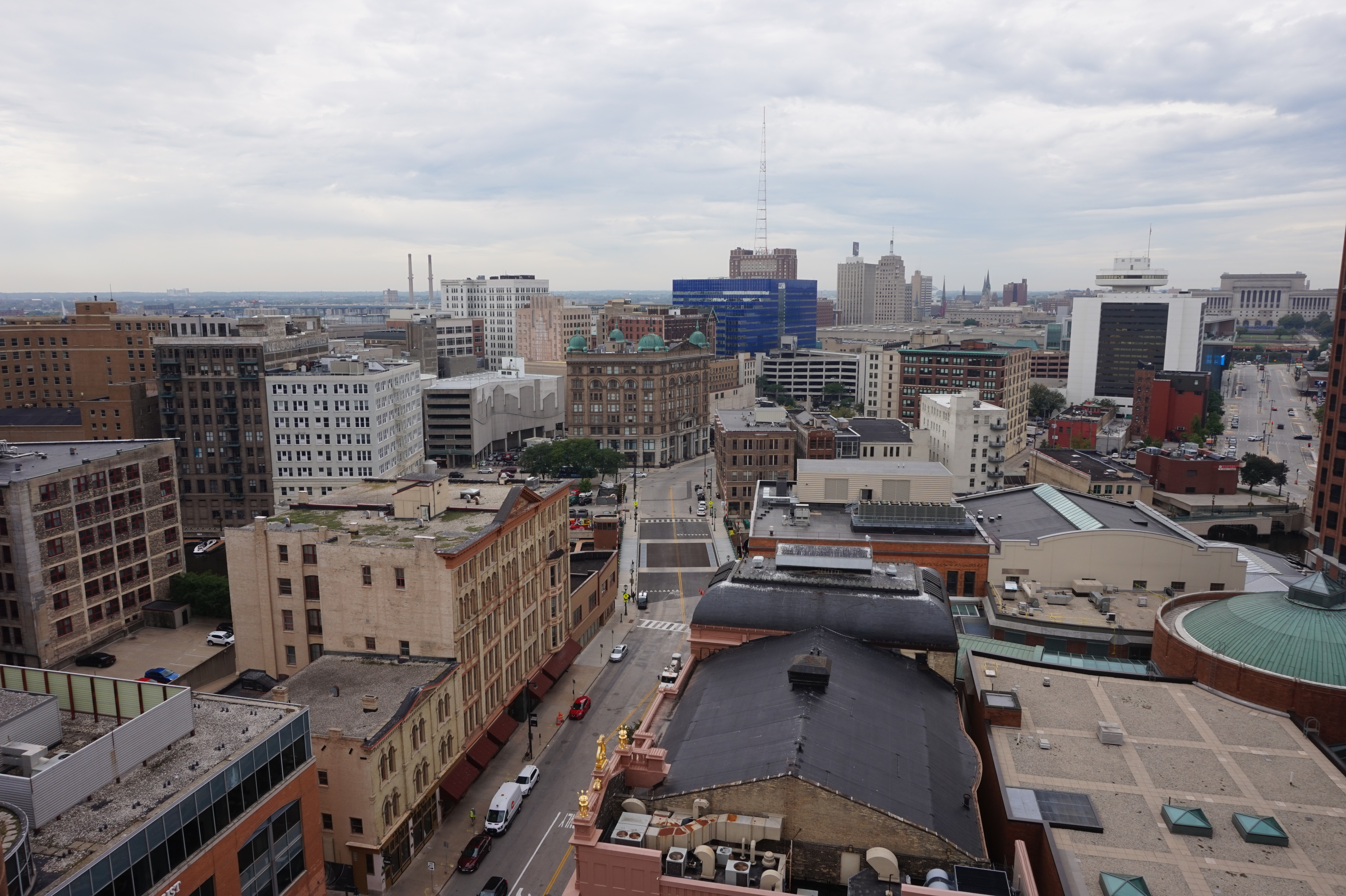
Westown Milwaukee from City Hall

Westown is an area west of the Milwaukee River and downtown, bounded by I-794 on the south, Marquette University neighborhood on the west, McKinley Avenue on the north, and the Milwaukee river on the east.

The neighborhood comprises the original Kilbourn Town in what is now downtown Milwaukee. The Shops of Grand Avenue, along with various theaters, restaurants, nightclubs, lies along Wisconsin Avenue. Other attractions in this neighborhood include the Milwaukee Public Museum, Fiserv Forum & "The Deer District", the US Cellular Arena, the Milwaukee County Courthouse and Old World Third Street.

The area has also become a focal point for Milwaukee's urban scene with events such as RiverSplash!, a three-day block party which begins Milwaukee's summer festival season, and River Rhythms, both held at Pere Marquette Park.

The Westown neighborhood has seen a substantial amount of redevelopment since the 2000s. It is home to one of Milwaukee's two free, public Wi-Fi outdoor Hotspots located in Pere Marquette Park. Within West Town about 3,000 reside. Some skyscrapers like the Wisconsin Tower have been converted into upscale condominiums. The city of Milwaukee has wanted to develop Westown as a place to eat, work and live.

== See also ==
- History of Milwaukee, Wisconsin
- List of unincorporated communities in Wisconsin
