= Esperanza Unida, Inc. =

American non-profit organization

- Formation: 1971
- Type: Non-profit organization

Esperanza Unida, Inc. is a non-profit organization based in Milwaukee that represents Latino workers in workers' and unemployment compensation hearings. The organization's mission is to provide un- and underemployed individuals with training for steady, family-supporting jobs, from asbestos removal to car repairs to welding to child care.

The model was studied and implemented around the country.

After losing its non-profit status, the agency had its non-profit status restored by the IRS in April, 2012.

== Esperanza Unida International Building ==
The Esperanza Unida International Building is located on the city's near south side on the western edge of the Walker's Point neighborhood. The building had been abandoned and fell into disrepair when the organization acquired it from the city in 1990. A number of non-profit organizations serving Milwaukee's South side moved into the building, creating a focal point for the Latino community.

In December 2014, the building was seized by the city of Milwaukee via foreclosure for unpaid property taxes. The building was converted to first-floor office space (including a radio station, a staffing agency, and the Wisconsin Housing and Economic Development Authority) and 36 apartment units.

== Mural of Peace ==
The building features Wisconsin’s largest mural on the side facing Interstate 43 north. Called the "Mural of Peace," it depicts an eagle and dove with a sunburst rainbow of flags. Artist Reynaldo Hernandez designed the mural and community volunteers painted the four by eight foot aluminum panels, which make up the 60 by 152 foot image. The mural was completed in 1994. In 2012, Esperanza Unida, Inc. was awarded a grant by the Milwaukee Arts Board to repair the mural.
