= Woodland Pattern Book Center =

American poetry organization

Coordinates: 43.0712°N 87.9020°W

- Founded: 1979
- Founder: Karl Gartung; Anne Kingsbury; Karl Young
- Type: 501(c)(3)
- Purpose: literature, visual art, new and improvised music, experimental film, literary arts education
- Location: Milwaukee, Wisconsin
- Website: Official website

Woodland Pattern Book Center is a nonprofit organization in Milwaukee, Wisconsin's Riverwest neighborhood that is dedicated to the discovery, cultivation, and presentation of poetry and the arts. The organization was founded in 1979 by Karl Gartung, Anne Kingsbury, and Karl Young, and was named after a passage in poet Paul Metcalf's Apalache: "South of Lake Superior, a culture center, the Woodland Pattern, with pottery but without agriculture..."

Founder Anne Kingsbury served as Woodland Pattern's Executive Director until her retirement in March 2018. The organization is currently co-directed by poets Jenny Gropp and Laura Solomon.

Woodland Pattern is a founding member of the Poetry Coalition, a national alliance of more than 25 organizations dedicated to working together to promote the value poets bring to our culture and the important contribution poetry makes in the lives of people of all ages and backgrounds.

== Programs and services ==
Woodland Pattern's gallery space houses regular readings by small press poets and writers, visual art exhibitions, experimental films, and new and improvised music concerts. Annually, the center hosts a Poetry Marathon, featuring 150 poets and welcoming hundreds of community members throughout the day.

The organization also delivers literary arts education to all age groups, promoting a lifetime practice of reading and writing. Nationally recognized and up-and-coming writers and artists offer workshops and craft talks for adults, and several book and writing groups also meet at the center. Woodland Pattern's Youth Literary Arts Program is award-winning and includes summer poetry camps for youth in grades 6–12 and year-round creative writing and multi-arts classes for youth in grades 2–12.

Woodland Pattern's book center holds a curated and nationally recognized collection of over 25,000 titles of poetry, small press literature, and literary ephemera, including broadsides, chapbooks, and zines—often published in conjunction with the center's programs and spanning nearly four decades. Their Native American literature section is the largest in Wisconsin, and their selection of small-press poetry is the largest of its kind in the country. While books from the center may be purchased, the space also serves as a neighborhood reading room, and people are encouraged to browse and study at their leisure.

Woodland Pattern is known for its community alliances, its efforts to bridge cultural and genre divides, and the diversity of its offerings, as well as its emphasis on new (experimental) writers and writing.

Poet Jerome Rothenberg has praised Woodland Pattern's reputation as "national in scope, and I know of no other center - anywhere in the U.S. - that has carried on a more intricate and demanding program in the literary arts". Since opening its doors, the organization has presented a long list of seminal figures in contemporary literature, music, film, and art, including Guggenheim fellows, Pulitzer Prize winners, Poets Laureate, and Nobel Laureates in Literature. Laurie Anderson, John Ashbery, Margaret Atwood, Amiri Baraka, Stan Brakhage, William Burroughs, Wanda Coleman, Robert Creeley, Allen Ginsberg, Joy Harjo, Juan Felipe Herrera, Myung Mi Kim, Joanne Kyger, Nathaniel Mackey, Eileen Myles, Pauline Oliveros, Evan Parker, Pedro Pietri, Claudia Rankine, Leslie Marmon Silko, Cecilia Vicuna, Anne Waldman, and John Zorn are just a few of the more renowned artists who have performed in the Woodland Pattern gallery over the years.
