= Harambee (neighborhood) =

Neighborhood of Milwaukee, Wisconsin

Coordinates: 43°04′16″N 87°54′50″W

Harambee is a neighborhood in Milwaukee, Wisconsin in the North Side; bordering the Interstate-43. The neighborhood has a community center and an art gallery.

== Etymology ==
The origin of its name of the neighborhood is Swahili, and it is maybe close to "all together for one", but it is maybe close to "pulling together".

== Population ==
The neighborhood is densely populated, with old houses that is mostly two-story wooden frames. It was originally settled from Germans in the 1800s. Over the years, African-Americans migrated to here.

== Climate ==
Harambee is mostly spared from extreme floods because of its land terrain.
