= Riverwest =

Area of Milwaukee, Wisconsin, United States

- Neighborhood
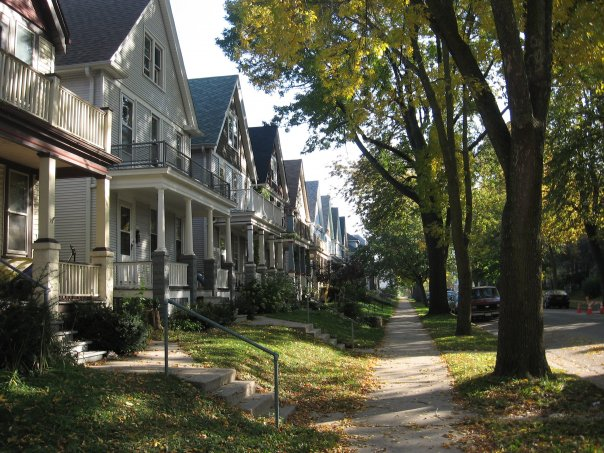
- A residential street in Riverwest
- Interactive map of Riverwest
- Coordinates: 43.07°N 87.90°W
- Country: United States
- State: Wisconsin

Government
  - Type: Milwaukee Common Council
  - Mayor: Cavalier Johnson
  - Alderman: Alex Brower, Milele Coggs

Area
  - Total: 1.00 sq mi (2.58 km^{2})
- Elevation: 617 ft (188 m)

Population (2020)
  - Total: 12,644
  - Density: 9,632/sq mi (3,719/km^{2})
- Time zone: UTC-6 (EST)
  - Summer (DST): UTC-5 (EDT)
- ZIP code(s): 53212
- Area code: 414

Riverwest is an architecturally and culturally distinct neighborhood located on the northeast side of Milwaukee, Wisconsin, situated directly west of the Milwaukee River. It is a neighborhood well-known in the Milwaukee Metropolitan Area as a hub of nightlife, the arts, and counterculture. The neighborhood developed in the late nineteenth century as a working-class enclave for Polish and German immigrants During the late twentieth century, grassroots organizing by the East Side Housing Action Committee (ESHAC) successfully blocked major road-widening projects, officially coining the name Riverwest in 1978 to solidify the neighborhood's unique identity.

== History ==
Riverwest's origins are related to the construction of dams on the Milwaukee River beginning in the mid-1830s when the area was known as a separate town called Humboldt. The first dam was located just south of Capitol Drive, the other further to south by North Avenue. The southern dam was designed by Byron Kilbourn to facilitate a 50-mile canal between Milwaukee and the Rock River which never came to fruition. While the canal never occurred, the dams later proved useful by providing waterpower for a manufacturing district located in the southern part of the neighborhood along Commerce Street. With the growth of the industrial district and adjacent Milwaukee, Humboldt was platted in 1850 to the west of the northern dam site. The usage of the name Humboldt continued into the early twentieth century. During this time the neighborhood continued to grow and Humboldt Boulevard was established and became the home of several large summer estates for wealthy Milwaukee families.

While the wealthy lived along the upper banks of the Milwaukee River valley, working-class immigrants began to move en masse to the lands to the west of Humboldt. By the 1880s, a significant population of Polish immigrants began to reside and open businesses in Humboldt. Members of the Polish Community constructed St. Hedwig Parish (1871) on East Brady and North Humboldt streets on Milwaukee's East Side. As their population grew north of the river, they constructed a second large masonry nave called St. Casimir’s Catholic Church in 1894. The church was completed in 1901 by architects Erhard Brielmaier and Sons. St. Casimir Church is a towering Cream City brick, Victorian Gothic Revival landmark that is recognizable by its distinctively mismatched twin spires. It remains a vital and distinctive historical monument to the late-19th-century northern expansion of Milwaukee’s Polish immigrant community into Riverwest.

The north bank of the Milwaukee River at Humboldt Boulevard is a large sloping hill which gave rise to the Polish nickname Zagora which means beyond the hill. Later in 1907, Milwaukee Catholics constructed St. Mary of Czestochowa parish. Riverwest continues to have a significant population of Polish people which can still be seen in the names of several local businesses.

Starting in the 1960s, significant numbers African-American and Latino residents began to move to the neighborhood. Riverwest was the site of several of Milwaukee's open housing marches. Other new residents to Riverwest were increasingly students at the University of Wisconsin-Milwaukee who found abundant amounts of affordable housing and an easy commute to the main campus on the East Side of Milwaukee. With an increasingly young and diverse population, a prominent counterculture community began to grow in the neighborhood in the 1970s. Outpost Natural Foods co-op, one of Milwaukee's first co-op grocery stores, opened on E. Clarke Street in 1971. Now located on Capitol Drive to the north of Riverwest, the neighborhood is still home to the Riverwest Co-Op. In 1976, a group of activists called the East Side Housing Action Committee, later ESHAC, successfully organized the neighborhood against the widening of E. Locust Street into a multi-lane format as it exists in neighboring Harambee. It was consultants hired by ESHAC who originally coined the Riverwest name in 1978 which remains today.

The history of Riverwest has been significantly shaped by a succession of immigrant and migrant communities beginning with the Germans and later, Polish, Italian, Puerto Ricans and African Americans. With the rapid growth of housing and employment options in Riverwest, there came a desire for firm community institutions both religious and cultural in nature. Riverwest remains an eclectic neighborhood with strong communal spirit, home to a community-run bar, co-op and a community radio station.

== Orientation ==
Riverwest is located to the west of the Milwaukee River. The neighborhood is bounded to the west by Holton Street, Capitol Drive to the North, the Milwaukee River to the east and North Avenue to the south. Additional geographical boundaries include Estabrook Park to the north, Milwaukee's East Side, Brewers' Hill, Williamsburg Heights, and Harambee.The main east–west arterial streets in Riverwest are Capitol Drive, Locust Street, and North Avenue which connect Riverwest to the East Side via bridges over the Milwaukee River. The main north–south arterial streets are Holton Street and Humboldt Boulevard which connect Riverwest to Downtown Milwaukee and the Lower East Side. Along with those streets, Locust, Center, and Burleigh Streets are other major east–west corridors with heavy concentrations of cafes, bars, and shops. The neighborhood is served by 7 bus lines of the Milwaukee County Transit System along with several Bublr Bike Share stations. In the late 2010s, the City of Milwaukee installed several type-2 bike lanes in the neighborhood and Milwaukee's first on-street protected bike lane.

== Population ==
Riverwest has a population of 12,644 living in an area of 1.3 square miles. Riverwest is locally noted for its racial and ethnic diversity, including large numbers of African-Americans and Caucasians, as well as growing Iranian, Russian, Asian, and Hispanic populations. With the neighborhood's proximity to the University of Wisconsin–Milwaukee, a sizable college student population also resides there. Rapidly rising real estate values in the nearby east side neighborhoods have made Riverwest more attractive to home buyers due to its closeness to downtown and the university. This, along with other housing and commercial developments, followed a long period of population and economic decline up through the 1990s. More recently, the trend has been rising property values and an increase in owner-occupied housing. Riverwest still features more affordable rental opportunities in its bungalows, duplexes, and "Polish flats" than is generally found closer to the university. Riverwest's relatively high level of racial and economic integration was studied in the 2017 book Live and Let Live by sociologist Evelyn M. Perry.

== Culture ==
Riverwest has many nonprofit and volunteer-run organizations, such as its neighborhood association, a community newspaper, a grocery co-op, Woodland Pattern Book Center, The Public House (co-op bar) co-op, an investment co-op, infoshop Milwaukee River Advocates, and a volunteer-run community radio station. Riverwest has many festivals, including Locust Street Days, Center Street Daze. The Riverwest 24, Milwaukee's only 24-hour annual bike race, started in 2008 and features local bands with multiple block parties. The neighborhood also features the Riverwest Art Walk, the state's largest walking tour of artists' homes and studios, neighborhood galleries, and various alternative spaces. In 2003, the neighborhood was the subject of its own book, Riverwest: A Community History, by Tom Tolan. In 2011, the neighborhood was the subject of a play, Riverwest: a Rhapsody, written by Eric Theis, and performed by Broom Street Theater in Madison. An annual 24 hour bike race known as Riverwest 24 is held in the neighborhood and takes on a carnival-like atmosphere. The race is a popular attraction for visitors and residents alike.

Woodland Pattern Book Center and the Florentine Opera are two prominent arts institutions in Riverwest. WXRW-LP known as Riverwest Radio and Riverwest Currents are two media organizations based in the neighborhood.

== Education ==
Milwaukee Public Schools operates area public schools. Grade schools included:

- Riverwest Elementary School (K-8)
- Frederick J Gaenslen School

The neighborhood is zoned to Riverside University High School located on the east bank of the Milwaukee River on Locust Avenue.

Private Schools include:

- Messmer Preparatory School
- La Escuela Fratney Elementary School
- St. Philip's Lutheran School
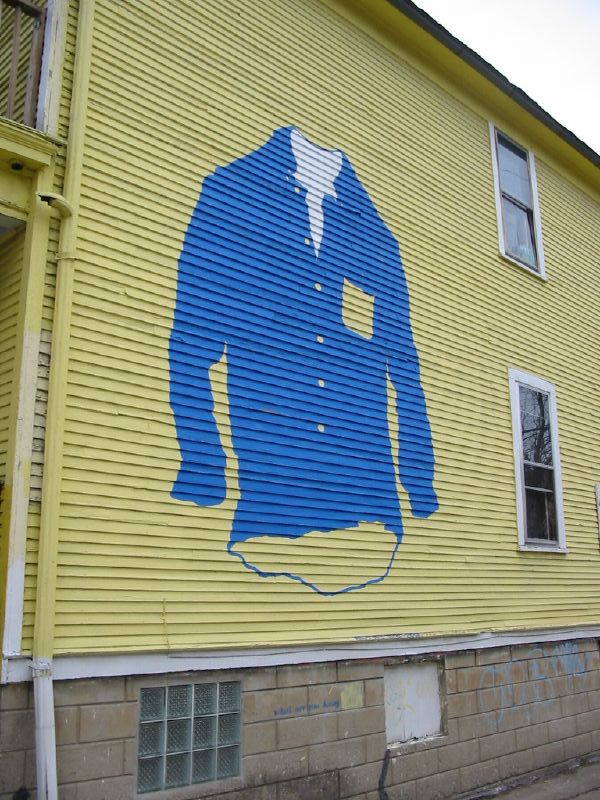
Street art on a house

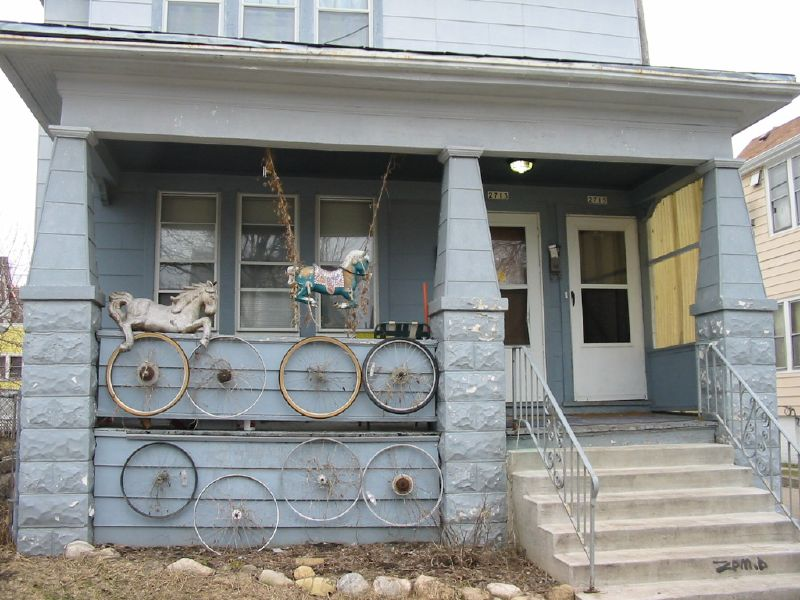
Eccentrically decorated duplex
