= Havenwoods State Forest =

State Forest in Milwaukee County, Wisconsin

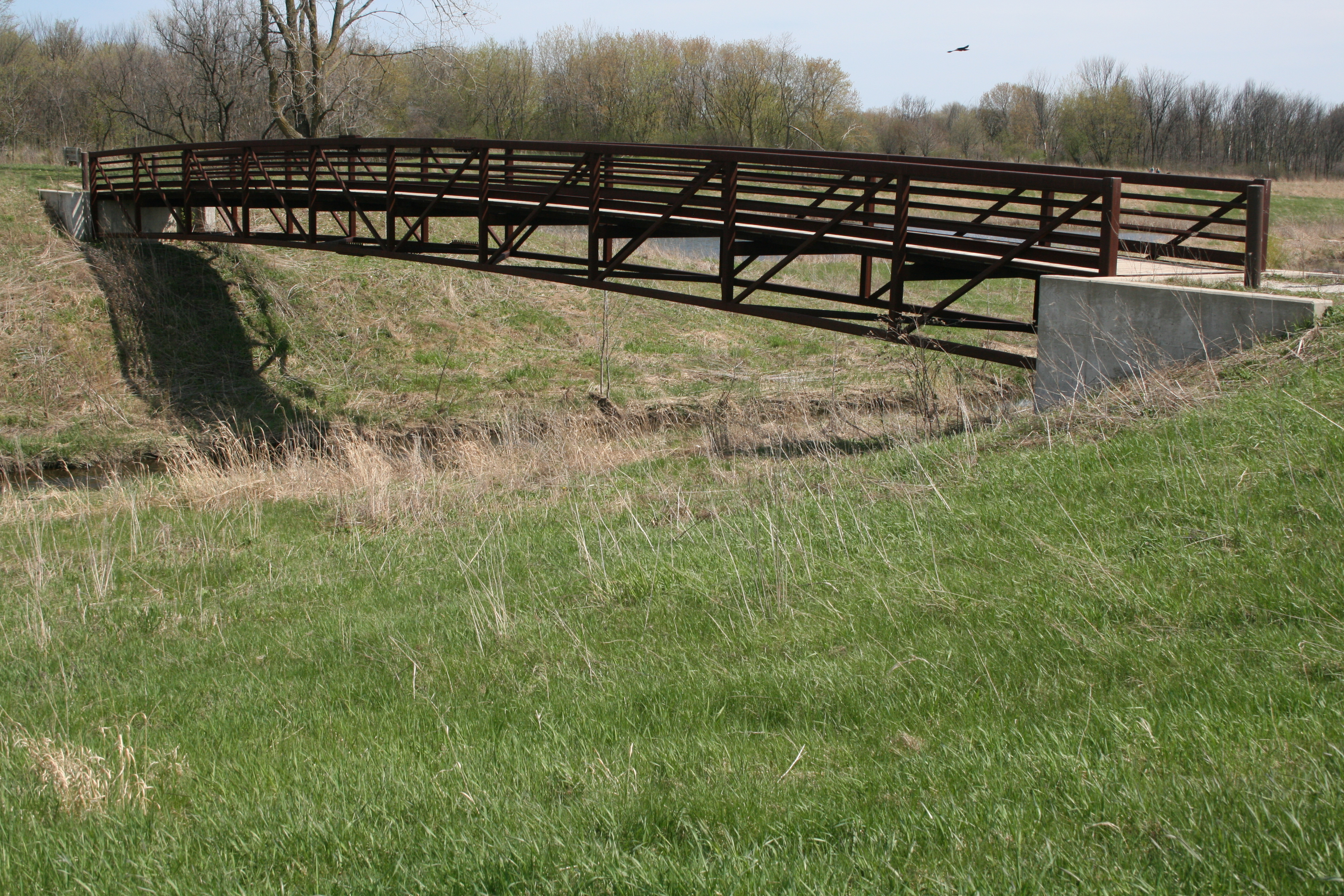
- Pedestrian bridge in Havenwoods

- Location within Wisconsin Location within the United States
- Interactive map of Havenwoods State Forest
- Location: Milwaukee, Wisconsin, United States
- Coordinates: 43°7′43″N 87°58′13″W
- Area: 237 acres (96 ha)
- Established: 1980
- Administrator: Wisconsin Department of Natural Resources
- Website: Official website
- Wisconsin State Forests

Havenwoods State Forest is a 237-acre (96 ha) property managed by the Wisconsin Department of Natural Resources within the city limits of Milwaukee. The forest was created to provide an urban green space and environmental education center.

The land includes grasslands, woods, wetlands, Lincoln Creek, an urban arboretum, and education gardens. The Environmental Awareness Center includes an auditorium, classrooms, displays, and a resource center. There are trails for nature study, hiking, biking, and cross-country skiing. Schoenecker Park abuts the property on the northeast.

== Gallery ==
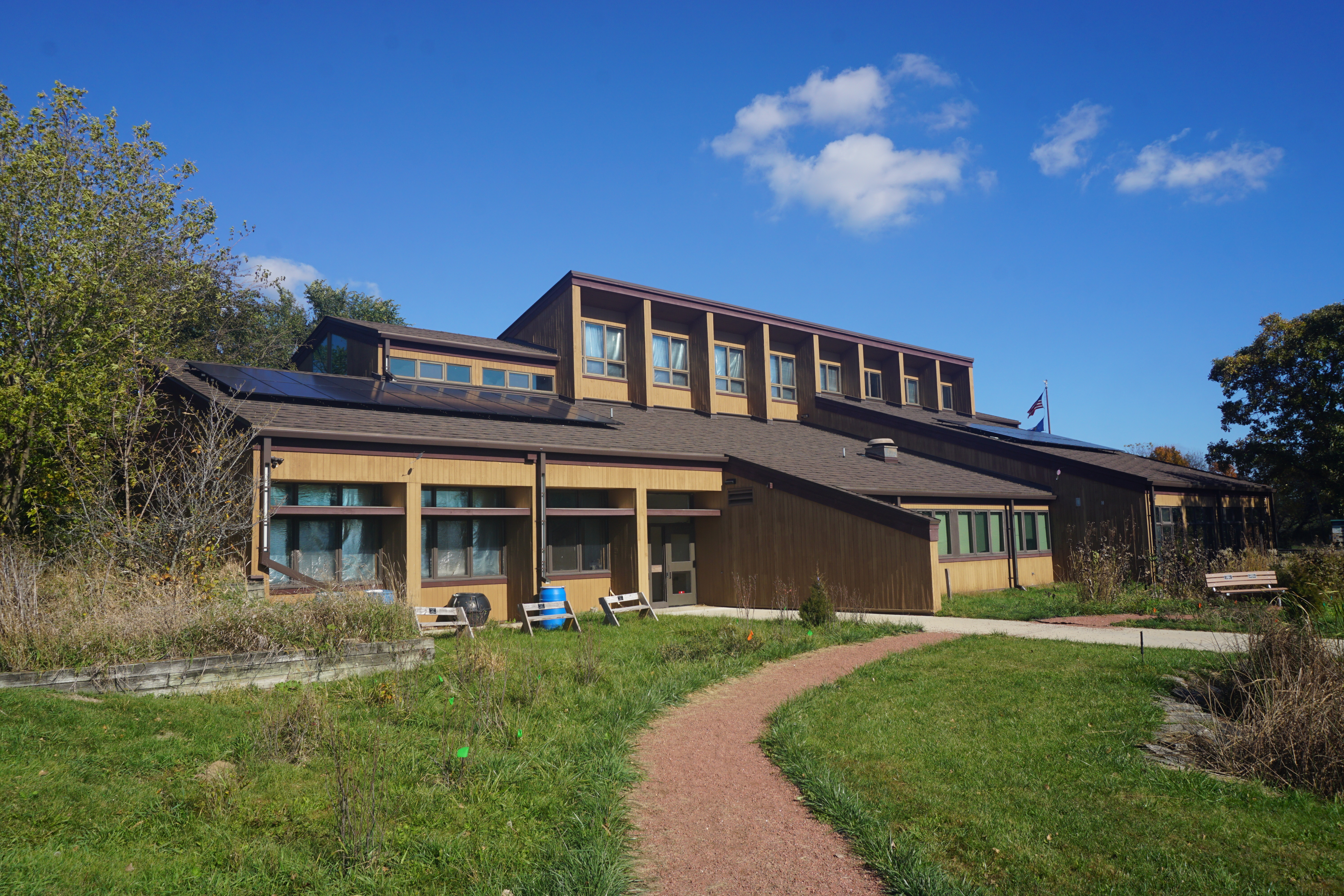
Environmental Awareness Center

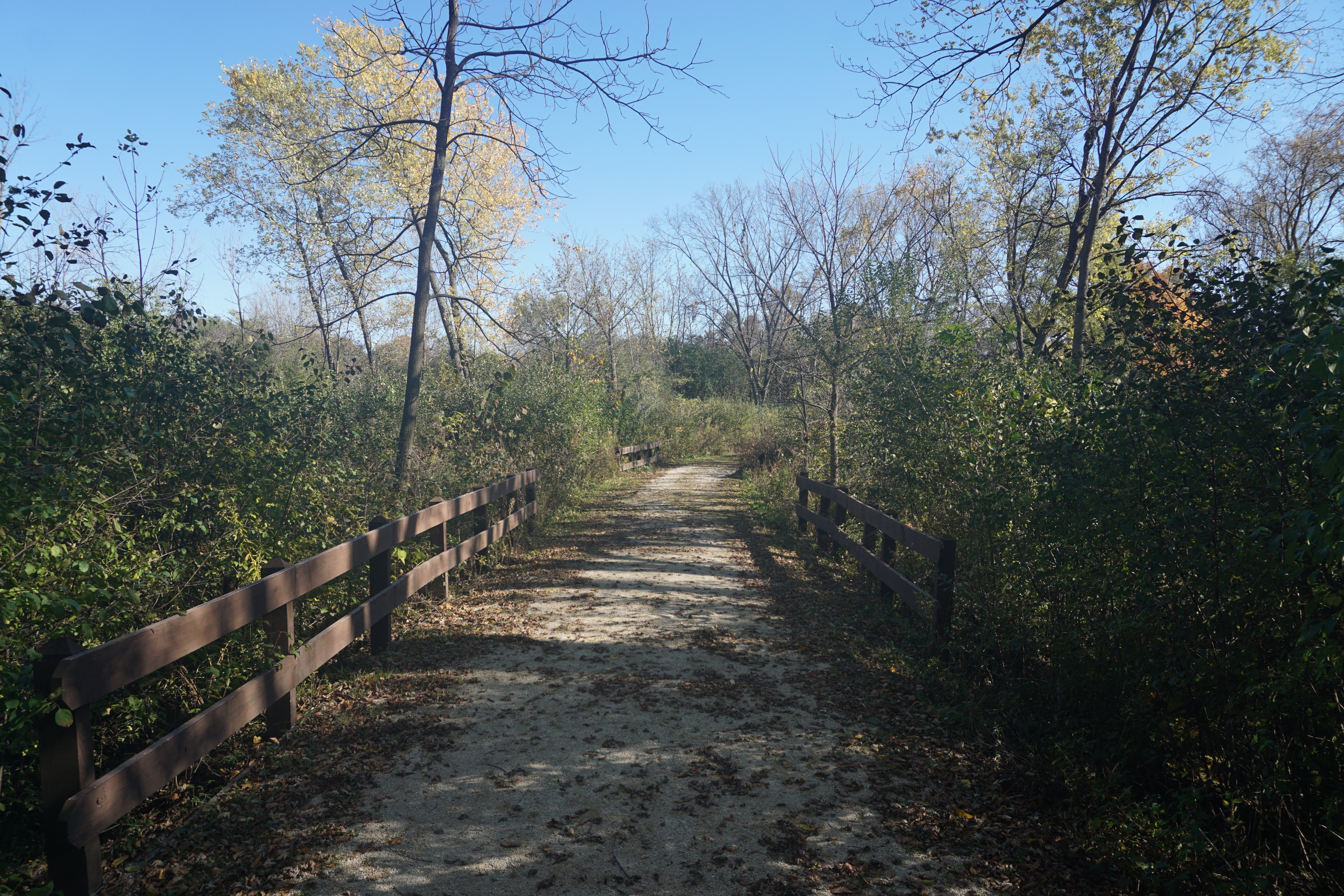
October 2025

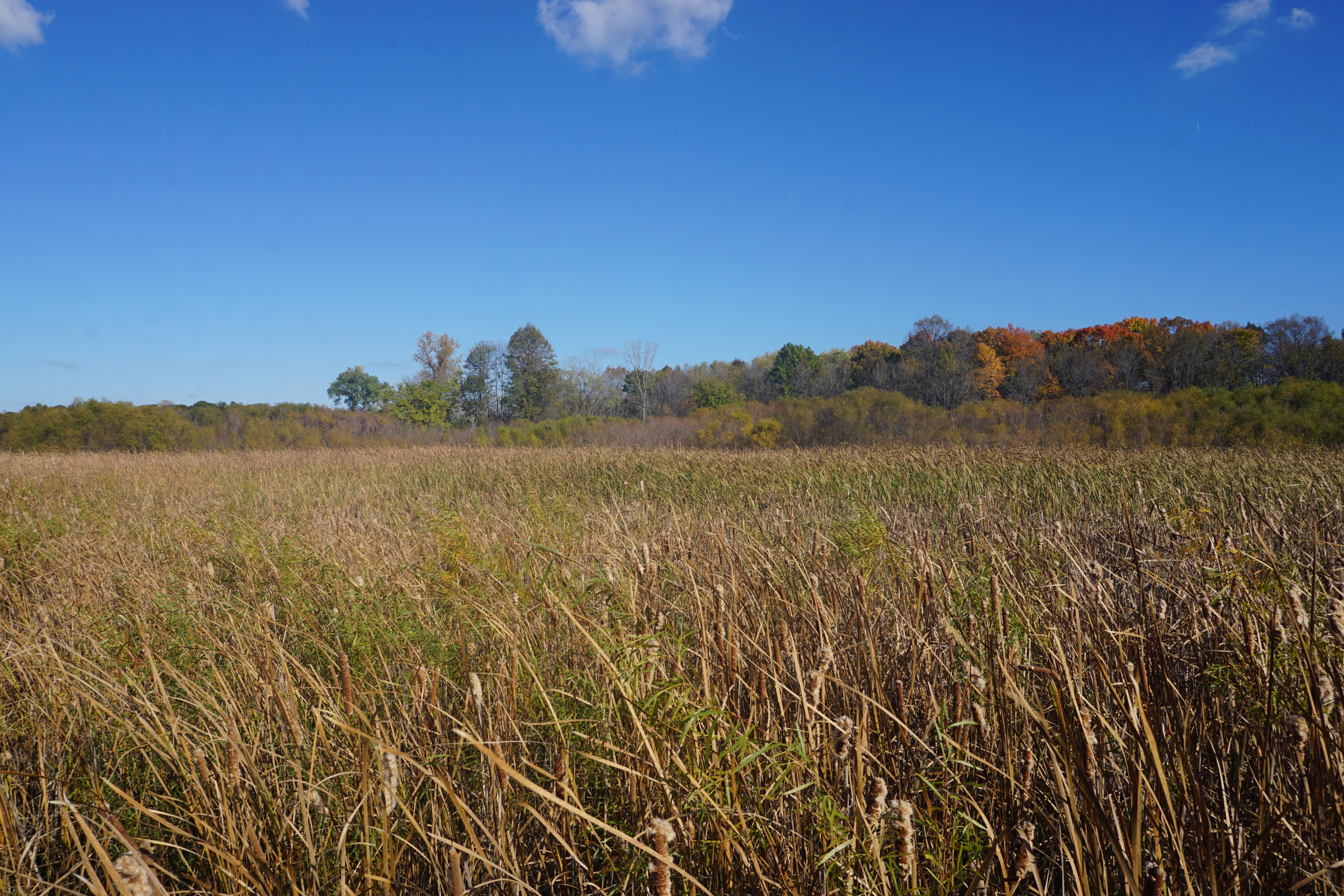
October 2025
