= Whitnall =

Whitnall may refer to:

== Places ==
- Whitnall High School comprehensive secondary school in Milwaukee, Wisconsin, US
- Whitnall School District, a school district in Wisconsin, US

== People with the surname ==
- Charles B. Whitnall (born 1859), first Socialist, treasurer of Milwaukee, Wisconsin, US
- Graeme Whitnall (1952–2021), Australian rules footballer
- Harold O. Whitnall (1877–1945), American geology professor and politician
- Lance Whitnall (born 1979), Australian rules footballer, son of Graeme Whitnall
- Mick Whitnall (born 1968), English guitarist for the band Babyshambles
- Tim Whitnall (born 1961), English actor
