= Boerner Botanical Gardens =

Botanical garden in Milwaukee, Wisconsin, United States

Coordinates: 42.9363°N 88.0313°W

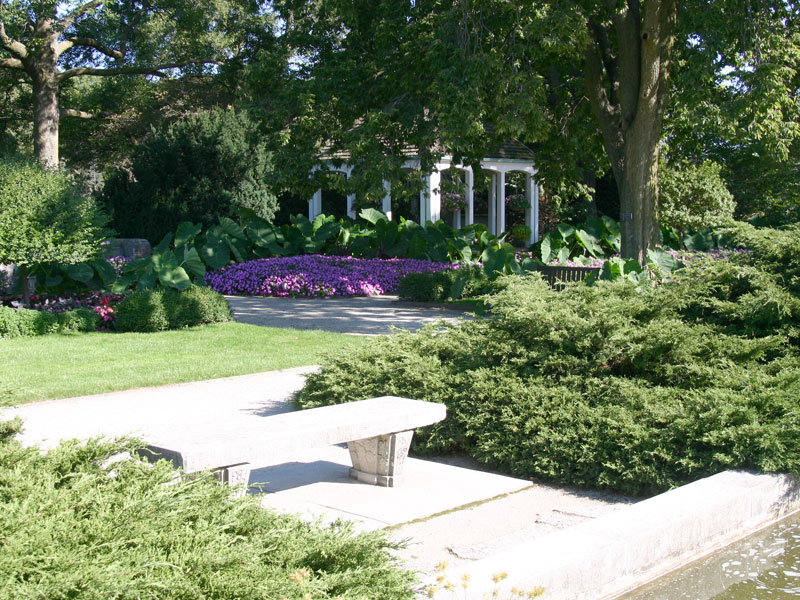
- Interactive map of Boerner Botanical Gardens
- Type: Botanical gardens
- Location: Whitnall Park in the village of Hales Corners, Milwaukee County, Wisconsin
- Website: Official website

Boerner Botanical Gardens are botanical gardens located on the grounds of Whitnall Park in the village of Hales Corners, Milwaukee County, Wisconsin. The gardens are named for Alfred Boerner, who designed the original five formal gardens. The Annual, Perennial, Rock, Rose and Peony Gardens were constructed in the 1930s. Later additions included trial, herb, lily and shrub rose gardens, as well as the Bog Walk.

Part of the Milwaukee County Park System, the gardens are maintained by professional horticulturists. Many species of plant life are cultivated and displayed. The gardens include test and display gardens for All-America Selections, and is an American Hosta Society Display Garden. Boerner Botanical Gardens is open from late April to early November, and closes for the winter.

Within the gardens and adjacent to them in Whitnall Park, and along the Root River Parkway is the arboretum, which showcases arranged groves of trees and shrubs. Nearby are the Wehr Nature Center and the historic Trimborn Farm estate, which are also maintained by the county park system.

== History ==
Boerner Botanical Gardens were founded by Charles B. Whitnall, founder of the Milwaukee County Park System; Alfred Boerner, who was responsible for the design and architecture of the gardens; and John Voight, director of the Boerner Botanical Gardens for 38 years.

The land for the gardens was purchased between 1929 and 1930 for $376 an acre, leaving Milwaukee County with little money to start the development of the park. Federal employment programs implemented during the Great Depression helped provide a workforce for developing the gardens, including the Civilian Conservation Corps (CCC) and the Works Progress Administration (WPA).

== Gallery ==
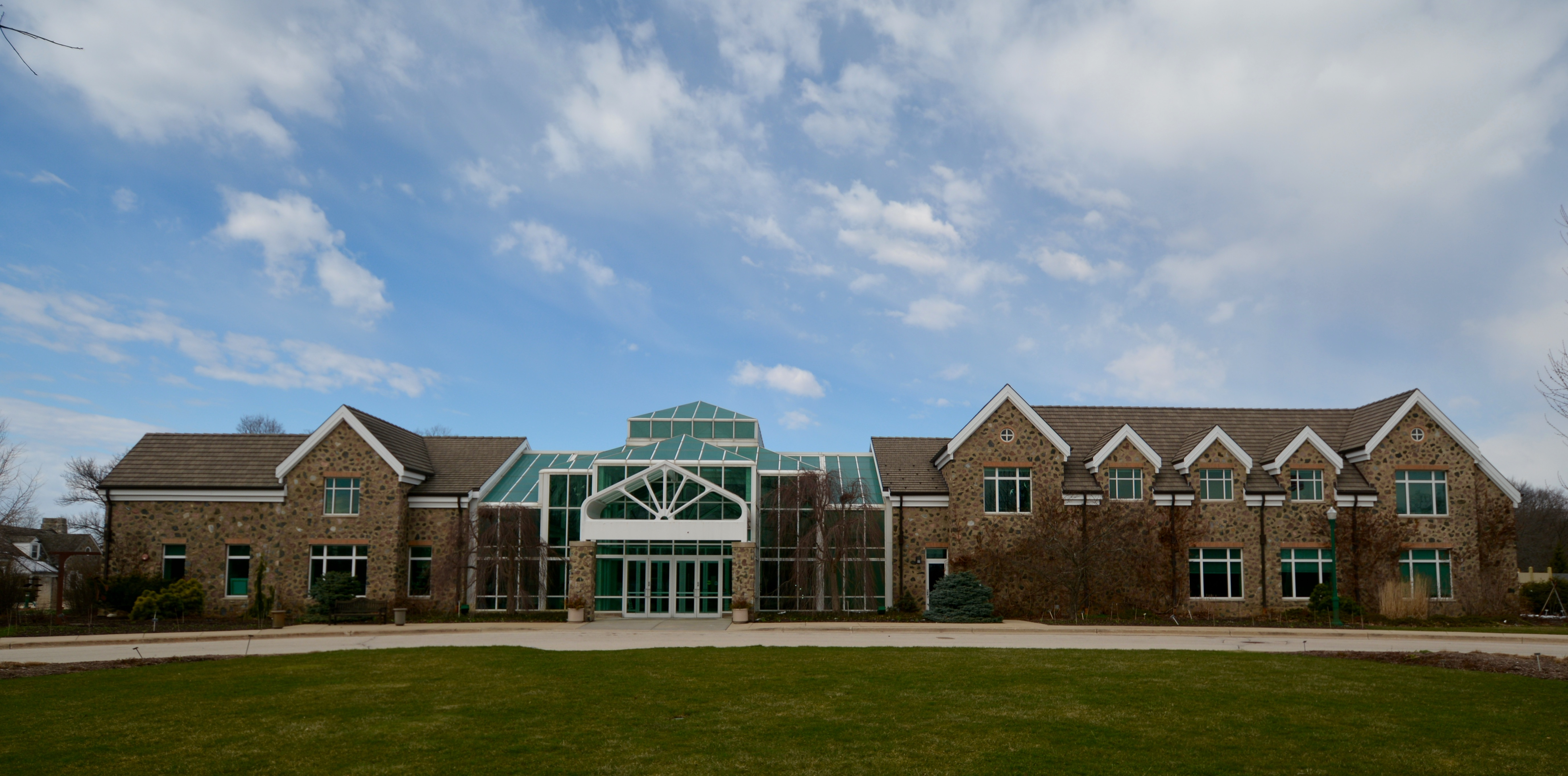
Main building.

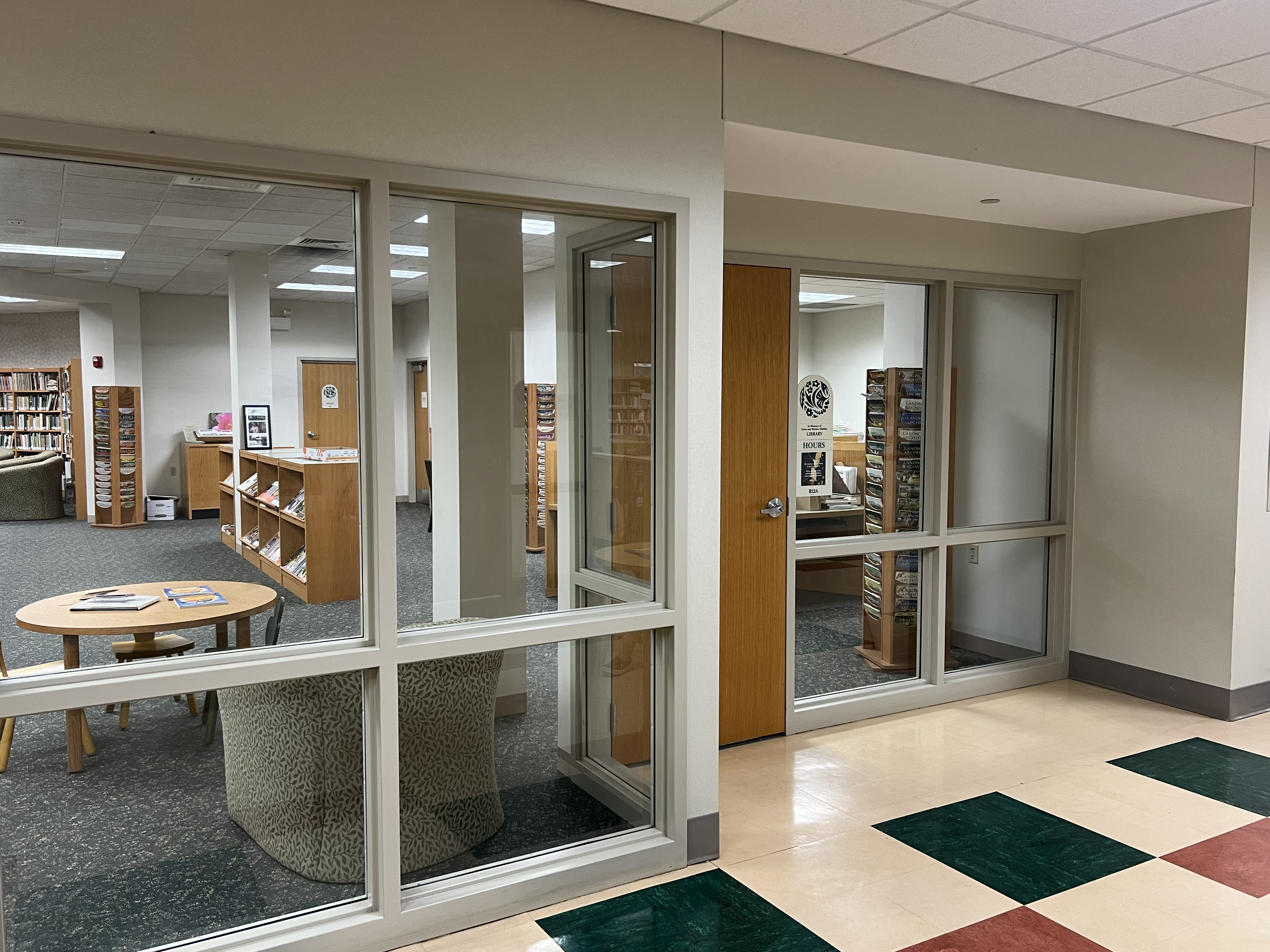
Library of the Friends.

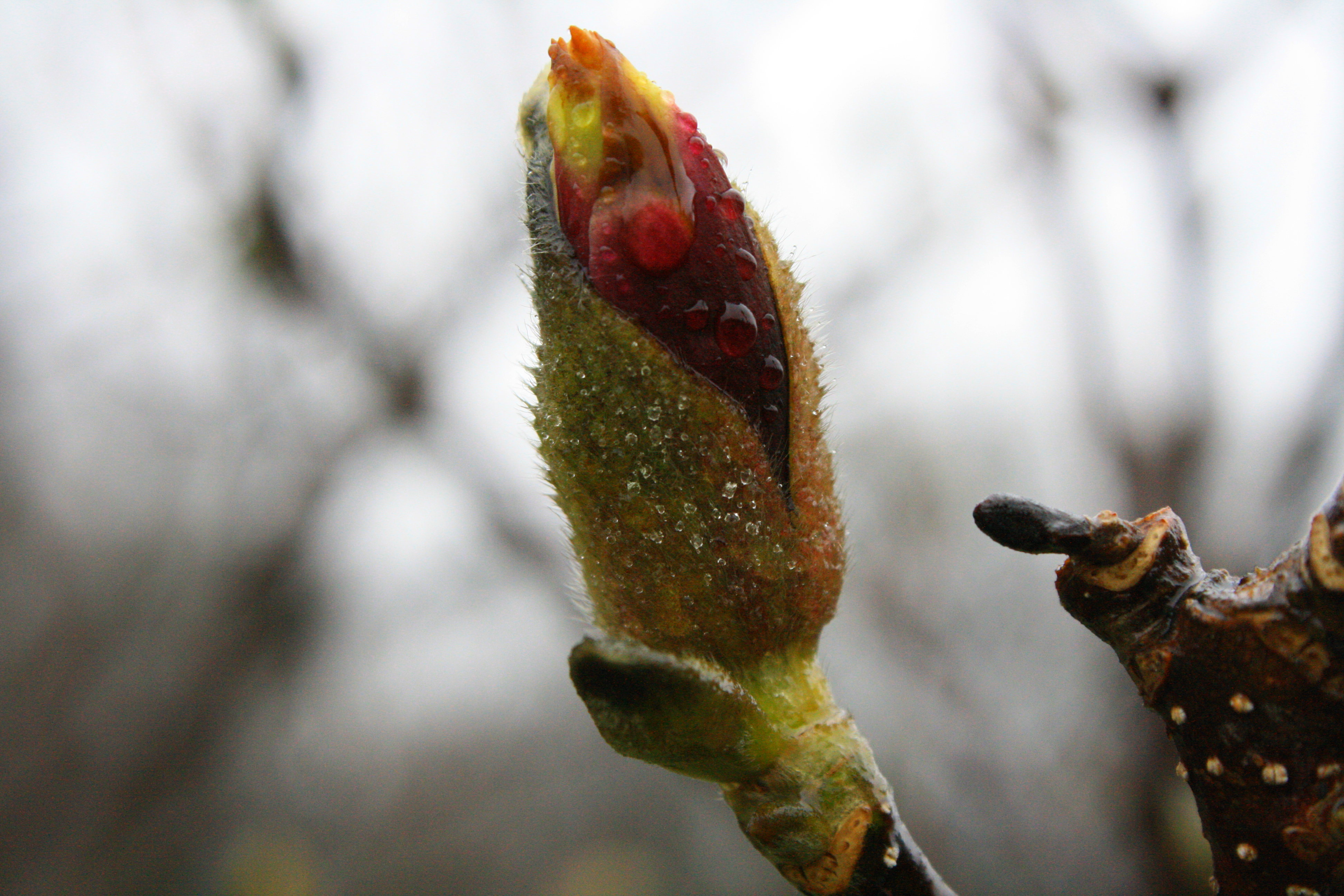
Plant in blossom.

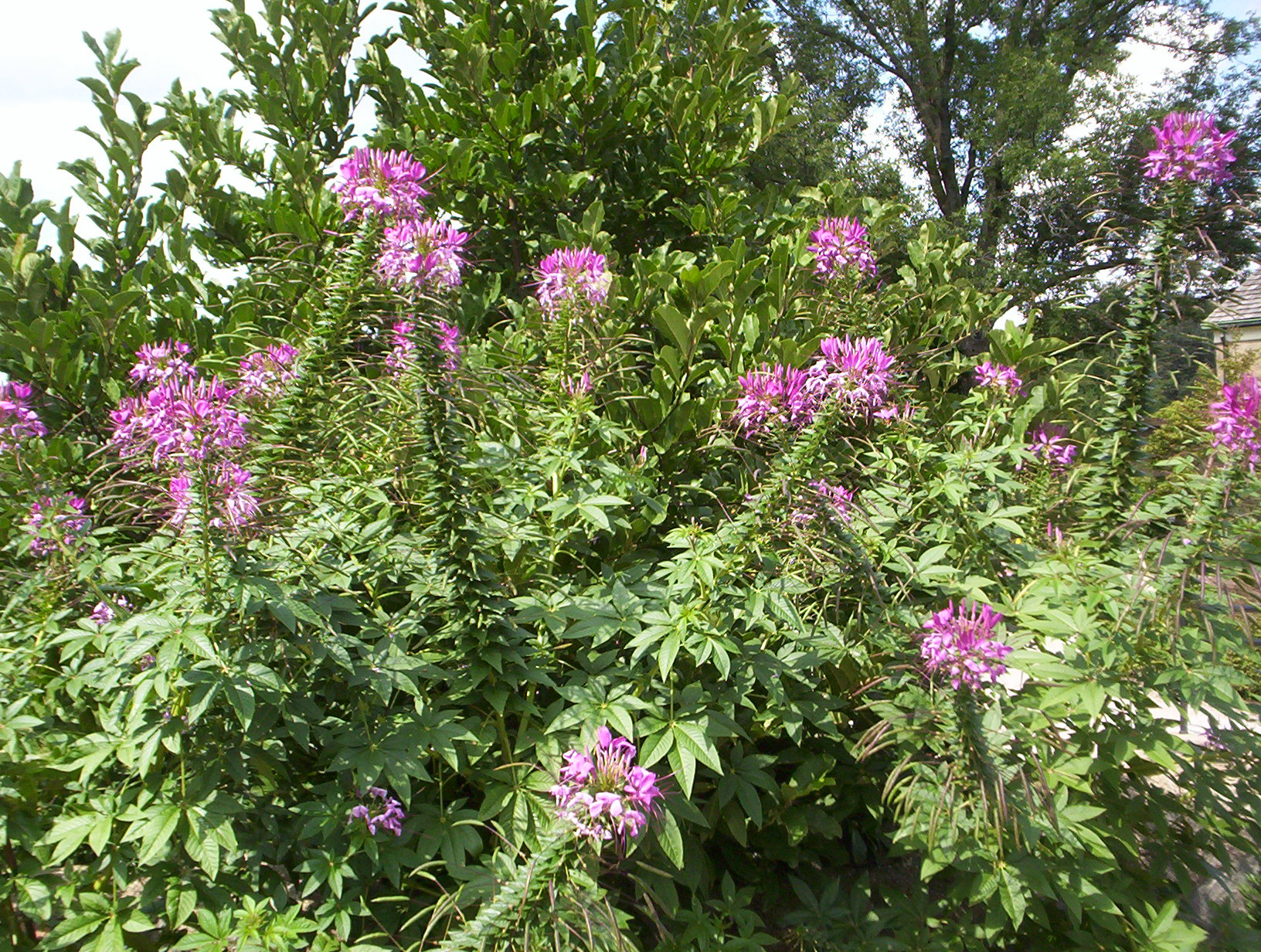
Violet Queen flowers.

== See also ==
- List of botanical gardens and arboretums in Wisconsin
- American Garden Rose Selections
