= Rosa 'Lady of Shalott' =

Apricot-orange shrub rose cultivar

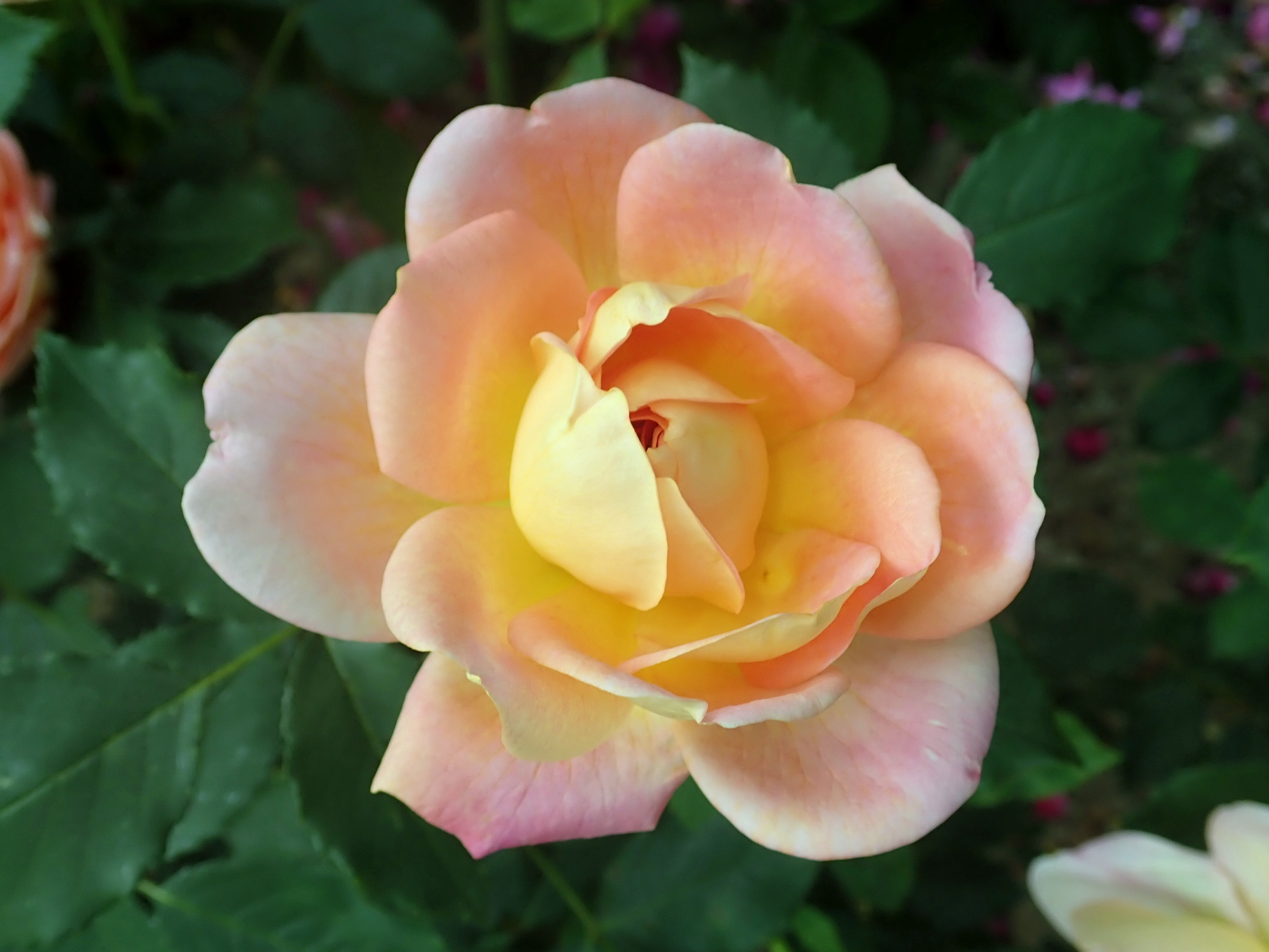
- Rosa 'Lady of Shalott'
- Genus: Rosa hybrid
- Cultivar group: Shrub rose
- Cultivar: 'AUSnyson'
- Breeder: David C. H. Austin
- Origin: Great Britain, 2009

Rosa 'Lady of Shalott' (a.k.a. AUSnyson) is an apricot-orange shrub rose cultivar, bred by British rose breeder, David C. H. Austin and introduced into the UK by David Austin Roses Limited (UK) in 2009. 'Lady of Shalott' is part of the David Austin English Rose Collection. It was awarded the Royal Horticultural Society's Award of Garden Merit in 2012 and the American Garden Rose Selections award in 2017.

== Description ==
'Lady of Shalott' is a medium, bushy shrub rose, 3 to 4 ft (0.91–1.22 m) in height, with a 2 to 3 ft (0.61–0.91 m) spread. It has a strong, fruity, clove fragrance. The flowers are medium-sized, 3 inches (76 mm), and very full (40+ petals). Orange-red buds open to apricot-orange globular-shaped flowers with salmon hues and a golden-yellow reverse. Flowers are carried in small clusters. Flower colour is apricot-orange with salmon hues and a golden reverse. The rose blooms in flushes throughout the season. Blooms tend to ball up in rainy weather. Leaves start out as a red-bronze colour and matures to a semi-glossy, and dark green.

== History ==
=== David Austin roses ===
David C. H. Austin (1926 – 2018) was an award-winning rose breeder, nursery owner and writer from Shropshire, England. He began breeding roses in the 1950s with the goal of creating new shrub rose varieties that would possess the best qualities of old-fashioned roses while incorporating the long flowering characteristics of hybrid tea roses and floribundas. His first commercially successful rose cultivar was 'Constance Spry', which he introduced in 1961. He created a new, informal class of roses in the 1960s, which he named "English Roses". Austin's roses are generally known today as "David Austin Roses". Austin attained international commercial success with his new rose varieties. Some of his most popular roses include 'Wife of Bath' (1969), 'Graham Thomas' (1983), 'Abraham Darby' (1985) and 'Gertrude Jekyll' (1986).

=== 'Lady of Shalott' ===
Austin developed 'Lady of Shalott' using two unnamed seedlings. The cultivar was introduced into the UK by David Austin Roses Limited (UK) in 2009. The rose is part of the David Austin English Rose Collection. 'Lady of Shalott' was awarded the Royal Horticultural Society's Award of Garden Merit in 2012 and the American Garden Rose Selections award in 2017 It was used to hybridize one child plant, 'Crawfish Etouffee' (2020).

'Lady of Shalott'

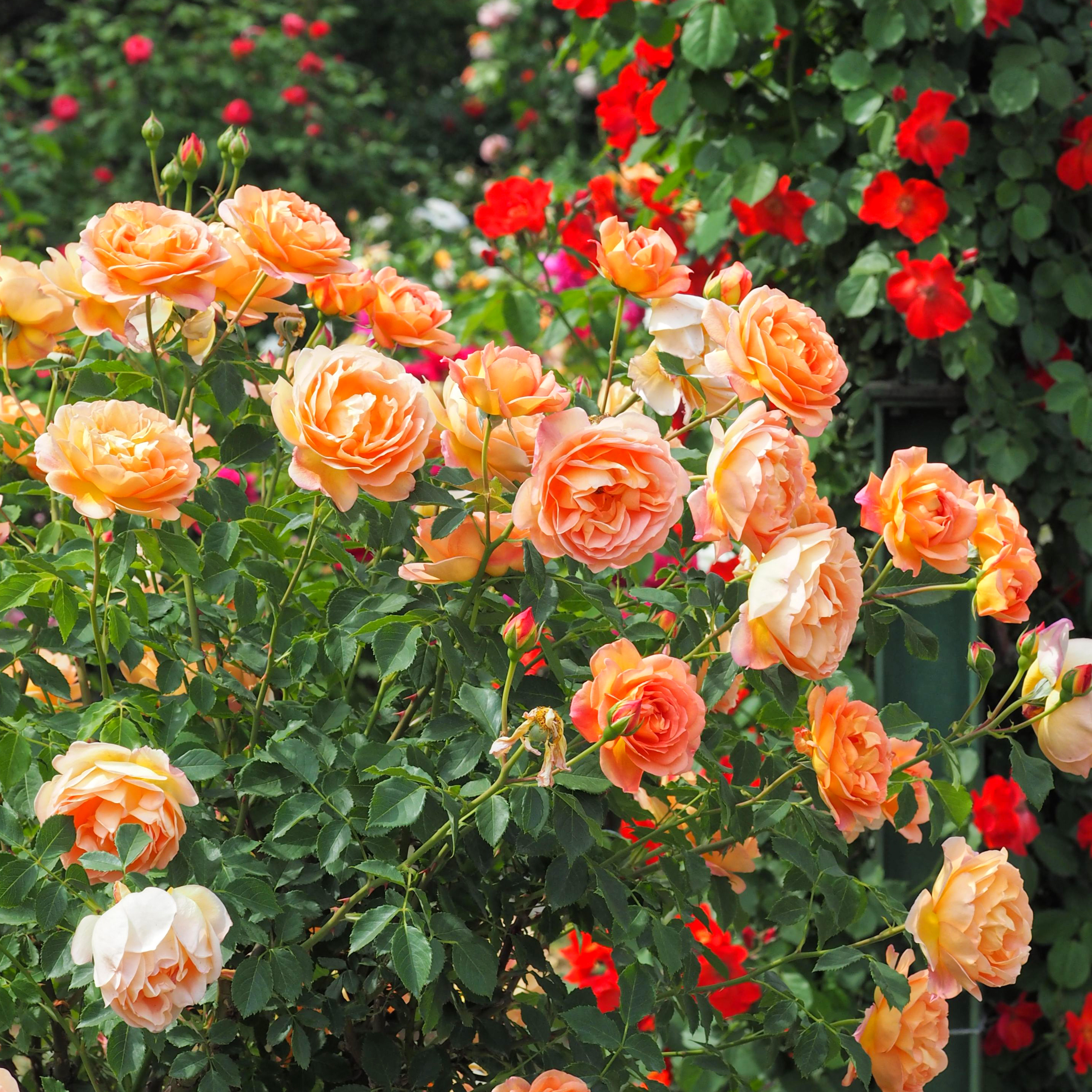

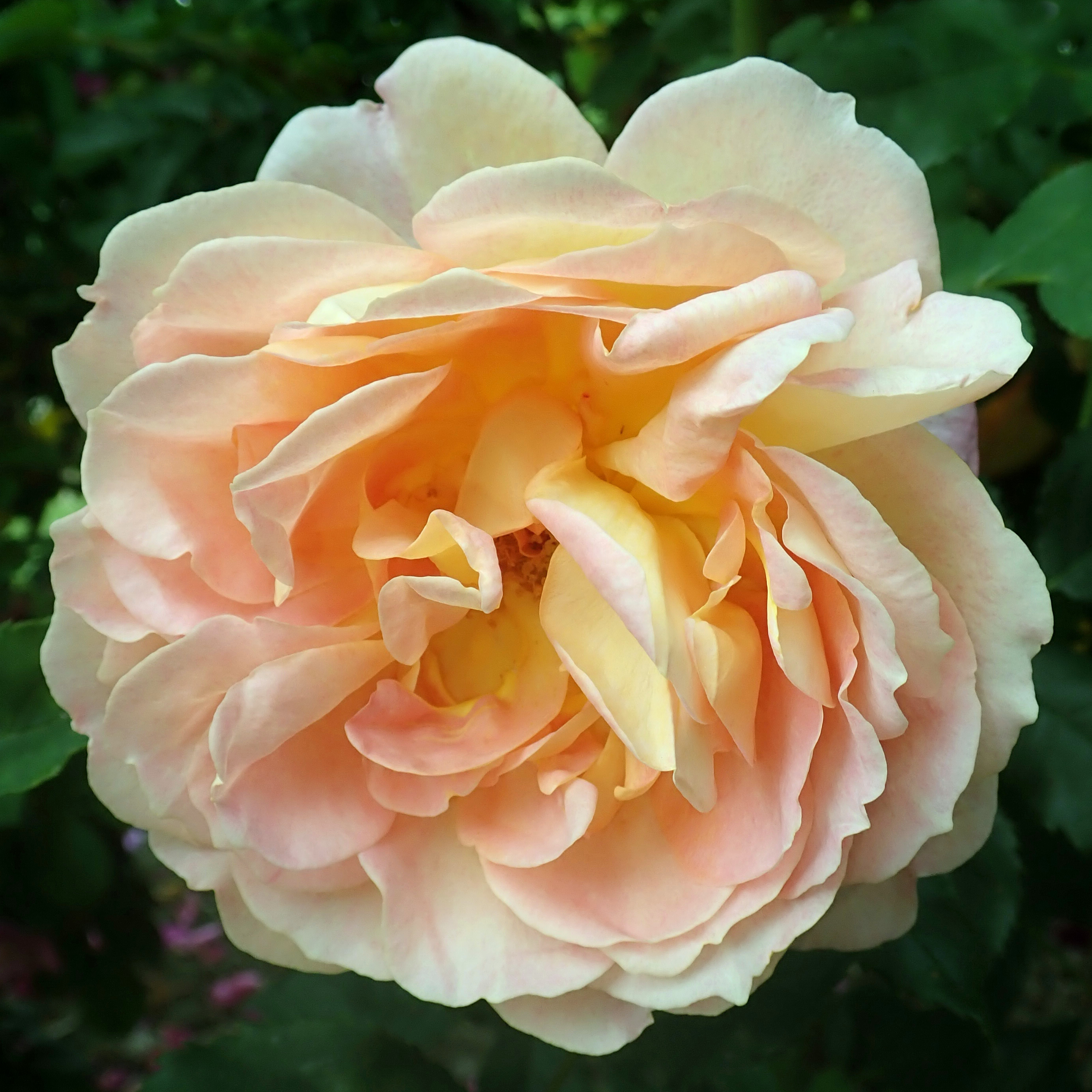

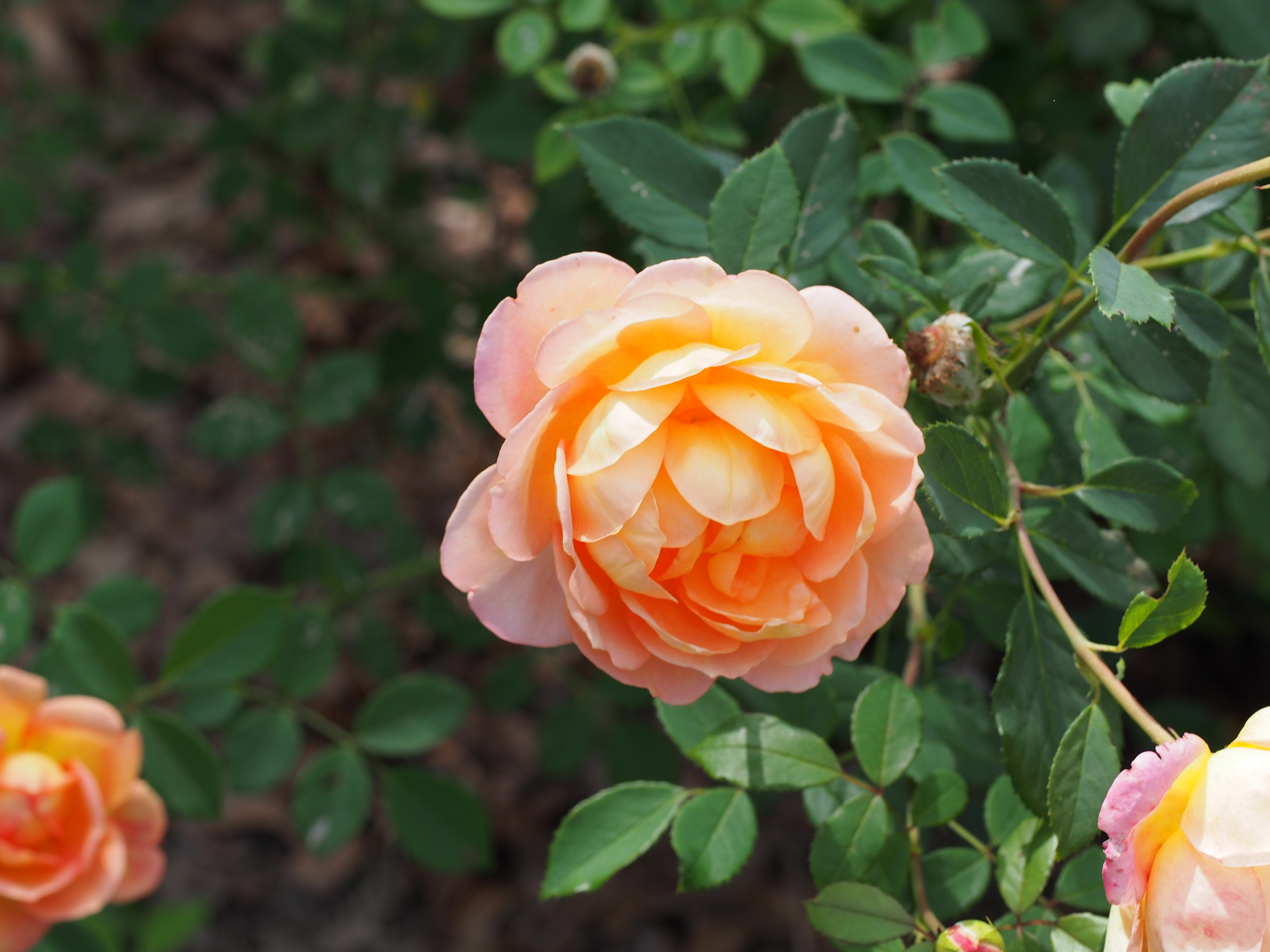

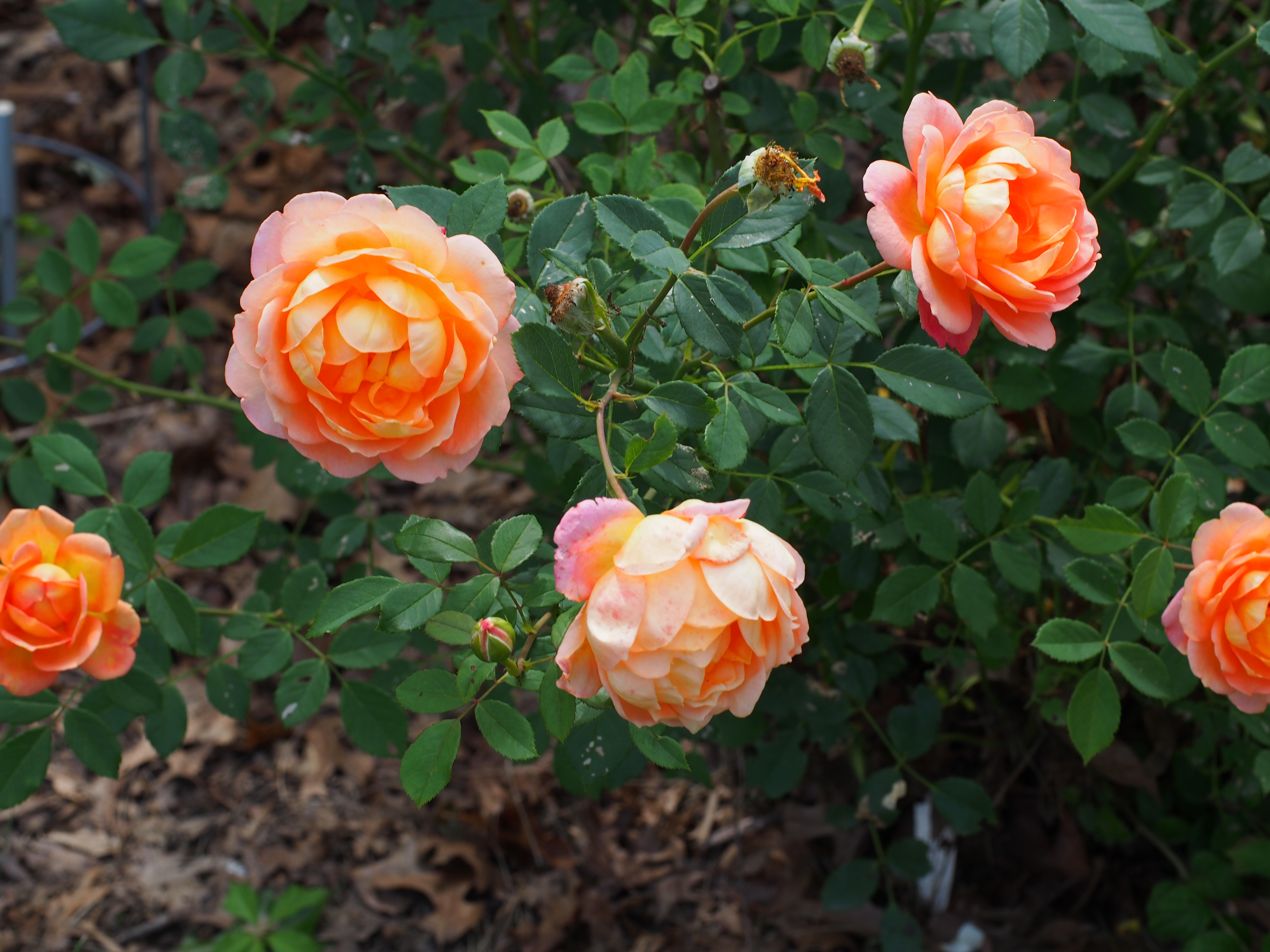

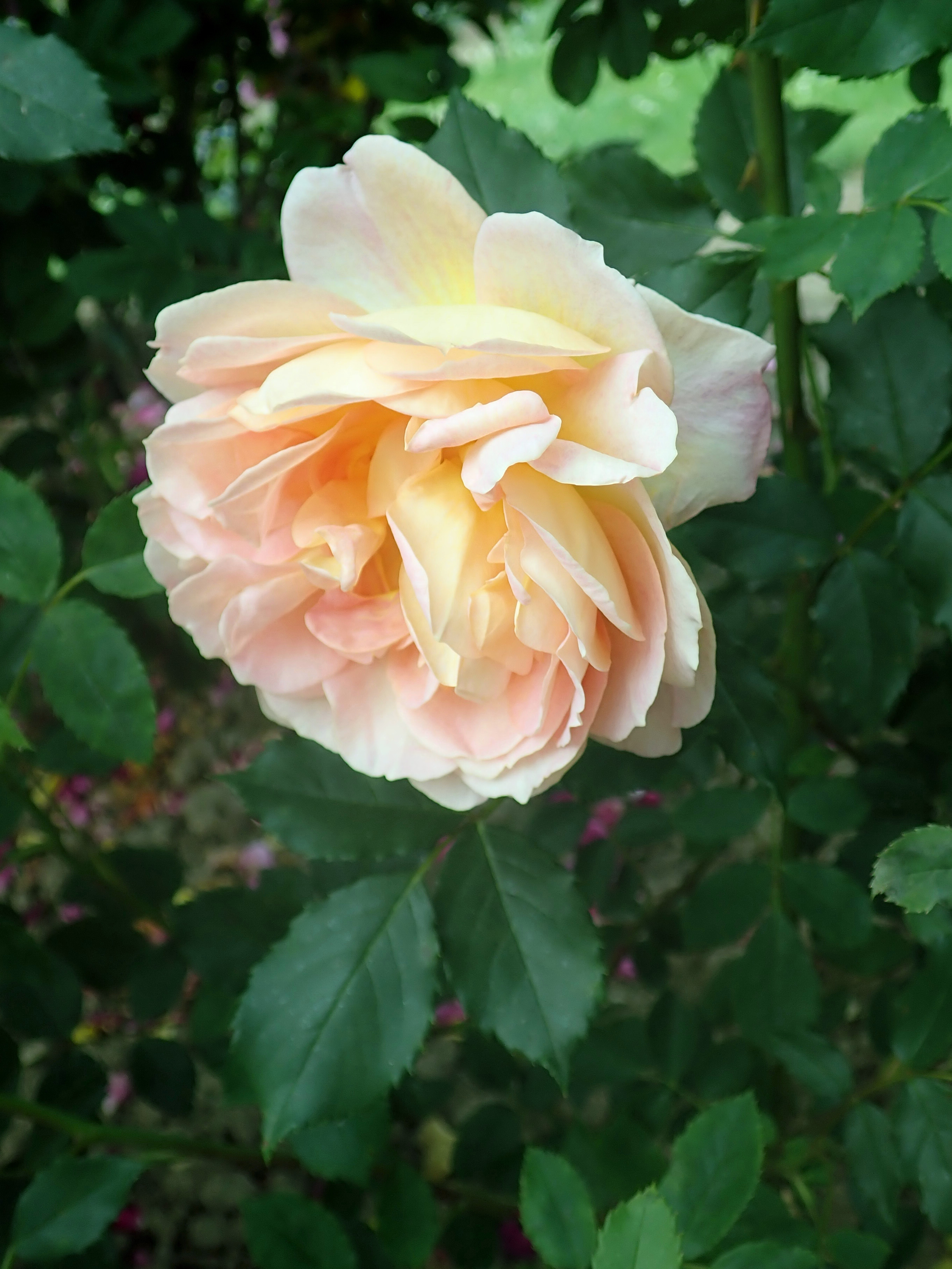

== Sources ==
- Quest-Ritson, Brigid; Quest-Ritson, Charles (2003). Encyclopedia of Roses. DK Publishing. ISBN 978-0756688684.
- Phillips, Roger; Rix, Martyn (1993). The Quest for the Rose. New York: Random House. ISBN 978-0-679-43573-0.
