= Whitnall School District =

School district in Milwaukee County, Wisconsin

Address
- 5000 S 116th Street Greenfield, Wisconsin, 53228; United States
- Coordinates: 42°57′16″N 88°03′23″W

District information
- Grades: PreK-12
- Superintendent: Lisa Olsen
- NCES District ID: 5506000

Students and staff
- Enrollment: 2,364 (2024–2025)
- Teachers: 174.57 (on an FTE basis)
- Student–teacher ratio: 13.54
- Athletic conference: Woodland Conference

Other information
- Website: www.whitnall.com

Whitnall School District is a school district located in southwestern Milwaukee County, Wisconsin, which serves portions of the cities of Franklin, Greenfield, plus all of the village of Hales Corners. Its offices are located on the grounds of Whitnall High School in Greenfield. The district is named after Charles B. Whitnall, who was Milwaukee's first Socialist City Treasurer from 1910 - 1912 and designed the Milwaukee County Parks System.

== Schools ==
- Whitnall High School, Greenfield
- Whitnall Middle School, Greenfield
- Edgerton Elementary, Hales Corners
- Hales Corners Elementary, Hales Corners

== See also ==
- List of school districts in Wisconsin
- List of high schools in Wisconsin
