= Seven Bridges Trail =

Seven Bridges Trail can refer to:

- Seven Bridges Trail in Grant Park (Milwaukee), Wisconsin, USA
- Seven Bridges Trail in North Cheyenne Cañon Park, Colorado, USA
- Seven Bridges of Königsberg, impossible mathematical problem
