= Grant Park (Milwaukee) =

Urban park in South Milwaukee, Wisconsin

- Grant Park sign
- Interactive map of Grant Park
- Type: Urban
- Location: South Milwaukee, Wisconsin, United States
- Coordinates: 42.9231°N 87.8485°W
- Area: 381 acres (154 ha)
- Established: 1911
- Designer: Frederick C. Wulff
- Administrator: Milwaukee County Parks
- Hiking trails: Seven Bridges Trail
- Water: Lake Michigan

Grant Park is a park in South Milwaukee, Wisconsin, United States, on the coast of Lake Michigan. It is the second-largest park in Milwaukee County. The park contains Seven Bridges Trail, a forested trail alongside a ravine with a stream. The trail contains ten wooden bridges, including a covered bridge at the trailhead, as well as stone walls and benches. The southern side of the park contains a sandy beach and a golf course. Founded in 1911, Grant Park was one of the first parks in Milwaukee County. The trails were largely developed under the leadership of Frederick C. Wulff in the 1920s and 1930s, with some work supported by federal agencies. The park receives thousands of visitors annually and has been the subject of ghost stories.

== History ==
Grant Park was founded in 1911, originally called County Park. The Milwaukee County Parks commission purchased the land from Horace Fowle. It was one of the earliest parks in Milwaukee County and contributed to the development of the county's park system, which aimed to create natural spaces within the urban sprawl of Milwaukee.

Frederick C. Wulff's house, now the Wulff Lodge, pictured in 1921

The park was largely developed by German-born horticulturist Frederick C. Wulff, who served as the Milwaukee County Park System's first Superintendent of Horticulture beginning in 1914. A Tudor Revival–style house was built in Grant Park in 1917, the home of Wulff, his wife Dorothy, and, later, their children. The park received a golf course in 1920, and Fowle's farmhouse, dating to 1892, was used as its clubhouse. Originally a 9-hole course, it soon became the first 18-hole golf course in Milwaukee County. The Wisconsin Highway System created the Grant Park Tourist Camp in 1921, and Wulff served as its superintendent. This camp was popular among automobile drivers traversing the Yellowstone Trail, with attendance peaking in 1929.

During the 1920s and 1930s, Wulff and his colleagues constructed a system of trails and bridges, featuring stone walls and benches, which would later be known as Seven Bridges Trail. The structures were designed to blend in with the natural surroundings. In 1929, the park system appropriated $5,000 (equivalent to $93,750 in 2025) to add lampposts to the park's roads, as well as $2,500 (equivalent to $46,875 in 2025) for beautification.

During the Great Depression, the federal Works Progress Administration (WPA) and Civilian Conservation Corps provided 200 workers to develop Grant Park. The federal government granted funds for the park, including $198,431 in August 1935 (equivalent to $4,659,757 in 2025). The WPA expanded Grant Park's trails. Elements of the park constructed during this period include a covered bridge, a waterfall, ponds, and dams. The Grant Park Tourist Camp closed in 1947. Wulff retired in 1948 and moved to Oregon. Barney Sparkowski became the park's superintendent, and his family occupied Wulff's former house. They left in 1959 and the house was unoccupied for years before being used for overnight lodging as the Wulff Lodge.

Five workers of the Wisconsin Conservation Corps worked on the park in 1995, restoring sections of the Seven Bridges Trail. Their work included building six bridges, using fallen stones to reconstruct 210 ft (64 m) of walls, replacing 21 ft (6.4 m) of stone stairs and 330 ft (100 m) of wooden railings, and renovating the Wulff Lodge. Its total cost was $70,000 (equivalent to $147,903 in 2025). Meanwhile, park staff restored the covered bridge.

A building on Grant Park's beach was constructed for lifeguards and abandoned around 2003 as lifeguards no longer operated. This building was renovated and converted into Ferch's Beachside Grille in 2016. It was owned by mother and son Betty and Jeff Ferchoff, who had previously worked on developments at Milwaukee's Bradford Beach. This and other developments gave the beach a surge in activity around the 2010s.

== Location and design ==
View of Lake Michigan from Grant Park

Grant Park is in the suburban community of South Milwaukee, Wisconsin, along Lake Michigan. It has 381 acres (154 ha) of land, making it the second-largest park in the Milwaukee County Park System (behind Whitnall Park). It contains 2 miles (3 km) of coastline. The Oak Creek flows into Lake Michigan at the southern edge of the park. Grant Park is located at 100 East Hawthorne Avenue, near Interstate 794. Grant Park Drive goes through it, with a small parking area, and Oak Creek Parkway runs near the south of the park. The Oak Leaf Trail, a bicycle trail, also traverses the park.

Grant Park contains a trail system of approximately 2 miles (3 km), known as Seven Bridges Trail. It runs alongside a ravine with a stream leading to the lake. The main loop measures 0.5 miles (0.80 km), and a staircase connects it to a side trail on top of a bluff, measuring 0.3 miles (0.48 km). The trail varies in elevation, and some parts provide an overhead view of the lake. It is surrounded by forest, blocking out the city. The trail's vegetation includes beech trees and wildflowers. Some bluffs with slopes greater than 60 degrees have little vegetation. The park also has many birds that migrate over Lake Michigan.

Entrance side

Exit side

The covered bridge at the head of Seven Bridges Trail

Seven Bridges Trail contains wooden bridges and is lined with stone walls and benches. Despite the name, there are ten bridges. These include a covered bridge at the trailhead, inspired by Bavarian architecture. Facing the entrance, this bridge contains the inscription "Enter this wild wood and view the haunts of nature," taken from the poem "Inscription for the Entrance to a Wood" by William Cullen Bryant. The exit side of the bridge contains the inscription "May the God given peace of this leafy solitude rest upon and abide with thee." The trail leads to Lake Michigan, where a large bridge spans the ravine. The Wulff Lodge is to the north of the trail.

The southern side of the park contains a sandy beach resembling a cove. It is downhill from Oak Creek Parkway and the Grant Park golf course. The beach was previously located further north, and the present-day site was used for boat building. The park also contains a lagoon, but, as of 2019, it was poorly maintained.

== Use ==
Grant Park is free to access, and the Seven Bridges Trail is open year-round. According to the National Recreation Trails Program, the trail receives thousands of visitors annually. It is a moderate hike. Seven Bridges Trail is known as a centerpiece of the Milwaukee County Park System.

On the beach, a pavilion contains volleyball nets, a playground, and Ferch's Beachside Grille. The beach also has a sculpture titled The Ghost Ship. The South Milwaukee Yacht Club is next to the beach. Visitors place love locks on the gate to the beach, a practice that began around 2014. As of 2022, it has hundreds of locks. The beach is also a popular place for collecting sea glass.

Grant Park has been the subject of ghost stories, influenced by the word "haunts" on the trailhead inscription. Some stories relate to claims of suicides within the park, and they feature elements such as mysterious lights and voices, as well as a human-like praying mantis creature. Another story describes the ghost of a crying woman wearing white, who searches the trail for her children who drowned in the lake.
