= Nancy Metz White =

American artist (1934–2018)

- Born: 1934; Madison, Wisconsin
- Died: December 10, 2018 (aged 83–84); Minneapolis, Minnesota
- Known for: Sculpture

Nancy Metz White (1934–2018) was a Wisconsin artist with large-scale outdoor public sculptures installed in two parks in Milwaukee, Wisconsin. White welded and sometimes brightly painted steel and forge flashings reclaimed from Milwaukee heavy industry. She described herself as a practitioner of urban archeology.

== Sculptures ==
Tree of Life, which is 2½ stories high, was erected in Mitchell Boulevard Park in 2002. Magic Grove, a grouping of three tree forms, was installed in Enderis Playfield in 2006. Conceived as a community gathering place, Magic Grove includes benches designed by the artist and a commemorative brick walkway. In both Tree of Life and Magic Grove, bird forms perch amid the tree branches, adding a fanciful touch.

A smaller welded outdoor sculpture, Helping Hands, whimsically constructed from hand die forms recycled from a glove factory, is on permanent display at the Mead Public Library in Sheboygan, Wisconsin.

In 2011, Fantasy Garden, a grouping of five larger than life painted steel flowers also made from forge flashings, was installed on the plaza of the retirement community, Saint John’s On The Lake, in Milwaukee, Wisconsin.

White also made a series of sculptures out of galvanized and stainless steel furnace pipe and flexible air-conditioning ducting.

== Biography ==
Born in Madison, Wisconsin, in 1934, White graduated from the University of Wisconsin–Madison with a bachelor's degree in art education and also did graduate study there. She served as creative arts coordinator at Urban Day School in Milwaukee, Wisconsin. She began to weld at the age of 45. White was also a printmaker and pastel artist. Her sense of color remained intact even in the face of dementia. She was married to Joseph Charles White who died in 2009. Their twin daughters are Michele and Jacqueline. Her papers are housed at the Milwaukee County Historical Society. She died December 10, 2018.

== See also ==
- Tree of Life
- Magic Grove
