= Todd Wehr =

C. Frederick "Todd" Wehr (April 14, 1889 -September 28, 1965) was an industrialist and philanthropist. He was co-founder of the Wehr Steel Company and founder of the Todd Wehr Foundation, Inc.

== Biography ==
Wehr was a graduate of West Division High School in Milwaukee, Wisconsin, and of Cornell University, in Ithaca, New York.

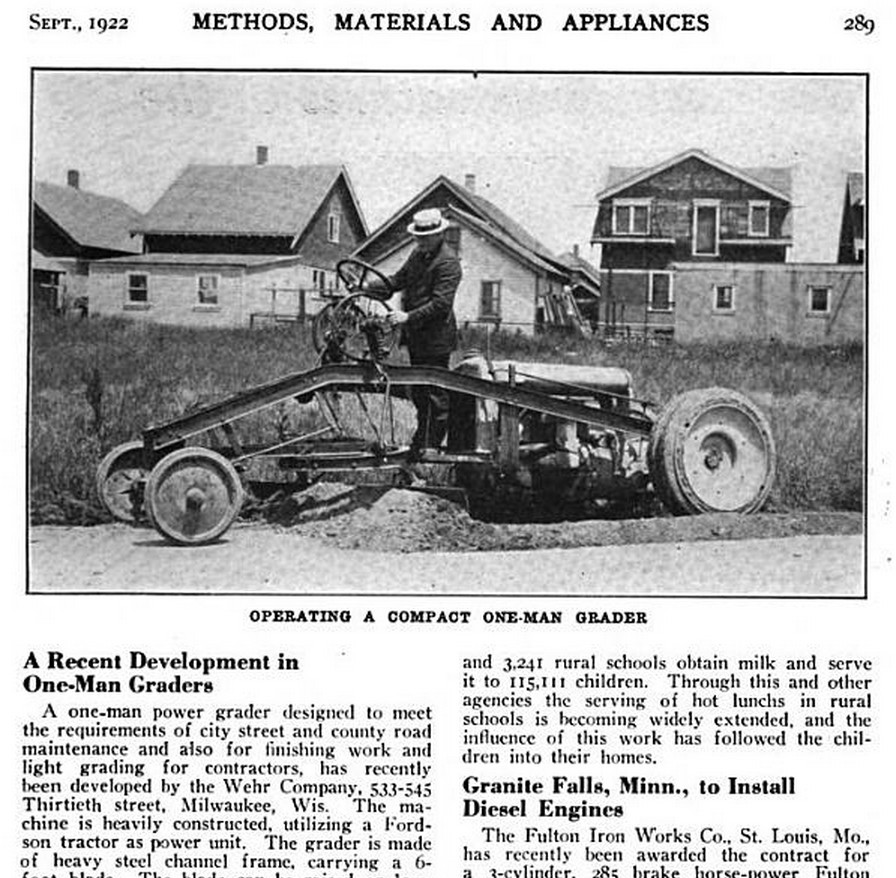
Motor grader made by the Wehr Co, using a Fordson tractor as a power unit

He and his brothers comprised the executive team of the Wehr Steel Company, which was founded in 1910 by his father, Henry Wehr. The company manufactured steel alloy castings for machine parts, magnetic separators, and brakes. During World War II, it received numerous "E" awards from the government for excellence in steel production.

In 1958, when the company was re-organized as a division of the Wehr Corporation, Wehr became the chairman of the board, a position he held until his retirement in 1963.

Venturedyne bought Wehr Steel in 1986.

=== Todd Wehr Foundation ===
Wehr left the bulk of his estate to a trust set up for charitable religious, scientific and educational purposes. Many Wisconsin universities and cultural organizations have benefited from the Todd Wehr Foundation, including Viterbo University, which received a grant to renovate the facility that now bears the name Todd Wehr Memorial Library. Marquette University also benefited from Wehr's philanthropy. Marquette has named its entire science complex after Wehr as well as a theater. The Milwaukee School of Engineering has an auditorium dedicated in his name as well.

The Todd Wehr Foundation is focused primarily on local Milwaukee giving, with an emphasis on elementary and high schools. The foundation focuses on large memorial gifts payable over several years, with emphasis on capital projects affecting children.

== Legacy ==
- Alverno College in Milwaukee, Wisconsin has a Todd Wehr Auditorium in Christopher Hall
- Carroll University in Waukesha has a Todd Wehr Memorial Library.
- Carthage College in Kenosha has a Todd Wehr Center, which houses the Dean of Students office, conference rooms, and a cafeteria.
- Lakeland College (Wisconsin) in Sheboygan has a Todd Wehr Center, which contains The Moose & Dona Woltzen Gymnasium, intramural fieldhouse, fitness center, weight room, and athletic offices.
- Concordia University Wisconsin in Mequon has a Todd Wehr Auditorium.
- Edgewood College in Madison, Wisconsin has a Todd Wehr Edgedome.
- Marquette University in Milwaukee, Wisconsin has a science complex and a theatre named after Wehr.
- The Medical College of Wisconsin in Wauwatosa has a Todd Wehr Memorial Library.
- Milwaukee School of Engineering had the Todd Wehr Conference Center. (The TWCC was renovated into a campus welcome center in 2021)
- Ripon College in Ripon has a building dedicated to Todd Wehr, which houses the mathematics, business, educational studies, and psychology departments.
- St. Norbert College in De Pere has a Todd Wehr Hall, which housings important student serving offices such as the Bookstore, the Registrar, Financial Aid, Student Accounts, Academic Service Learning, and the Academic Advising and Career Development Center.
- Viterbo University in La Crosse has a Todd Wehr Memorial Library.
- Wehr Nature Center, part of Milwaukee County Parks, is named after Wehr.
- Todd Wehr Alumni Center at Marian University in Fond du Lac, WI.
- Todd Wehr Theater in the Marcus Center for the Performing Arts in Milwaukee, WI.
- Todd Wehr Gymnasium at the Milwaukee Academy of Science
- Todd Wehr foundation supported St. Marcus Lutheran Church and school
- Todd Wehr foundation supported Wisconsin Lutheran High School
- Todd Wehr foundation supported Risen Savior Lutheran Church and school
- Todd Wehr Gymnasium at the Milwaukee Academy of Science in Milwaukee, Wisconsin.
