= Whitnall High School =

Coordinates: 42.95448°N 88.05614°W

Location
- 5000 South 116th Street; Greenfield, Wisconsin 53228; United States

Information
- Type: Public high school
- Established: 1959
- School district: Whitnall School District
- Principal: CIndy Garstecki
- Teaching staff: 57.73 (on an FTE basis)
- Grades: 9–12
- Enrollment: 821 (2024–2025)
- Student to teacher ratio: 14.22
- Color
- Athletics conference: Woodland Conference
- Team name: Falcons
- Rival: Greenfield High School
- Website: https://whs.whitnall.com

Whitnall High School is a comprehensive secondary school in Milwaukee County, Wisconsin. It is part of the Whitnall School District. It is named for Charles B. Whitnall, the first Socialist city treasurer of Milwaukee and the architect of Milwaukee County's system of public parks.

== Administration ==
Cindy Garstecki is the principal.

== Sports ==
WHS is a member of the Woodland-East Conference. Schools in that conference include Brown Deer, Cudahy, Greenfield, Milwaukee Lutheran, South Milwaukee, and Shorewood.

During the 2015-2016 school year, the school's varsity football program tied as Woodland East Conference champions, the 4th championship in school history.

Sports offered at WHS:

- Boys cross country
- Girls cross country
- Boys volleyball
- Girls volleyball
- Boys soccer
- Girls soccer
- Football
- Girls tennis
- Boys tennis
- Girls swimming
- Boys swimming
- Boys basketball
- Girls basketball
- Wrestling
- Boys golf
- Boys track
- Girls track
- Baseball
- Softball

=== Conference affiliation history ===
- Braveland Conference (1961-1963)
- Parkland Conference (1963-1997)
- Woodland Conference (1997–present)

== Notable alumni ==
- Lisa Brescia, actress
- Tyler Herro, basketball player
- Jeana Keough, actress
- Joel Stave, football player
- Nate Valcarcel, football player
