= Rosa 'Munstead Wood' =

Dark red shrub rose cultivar

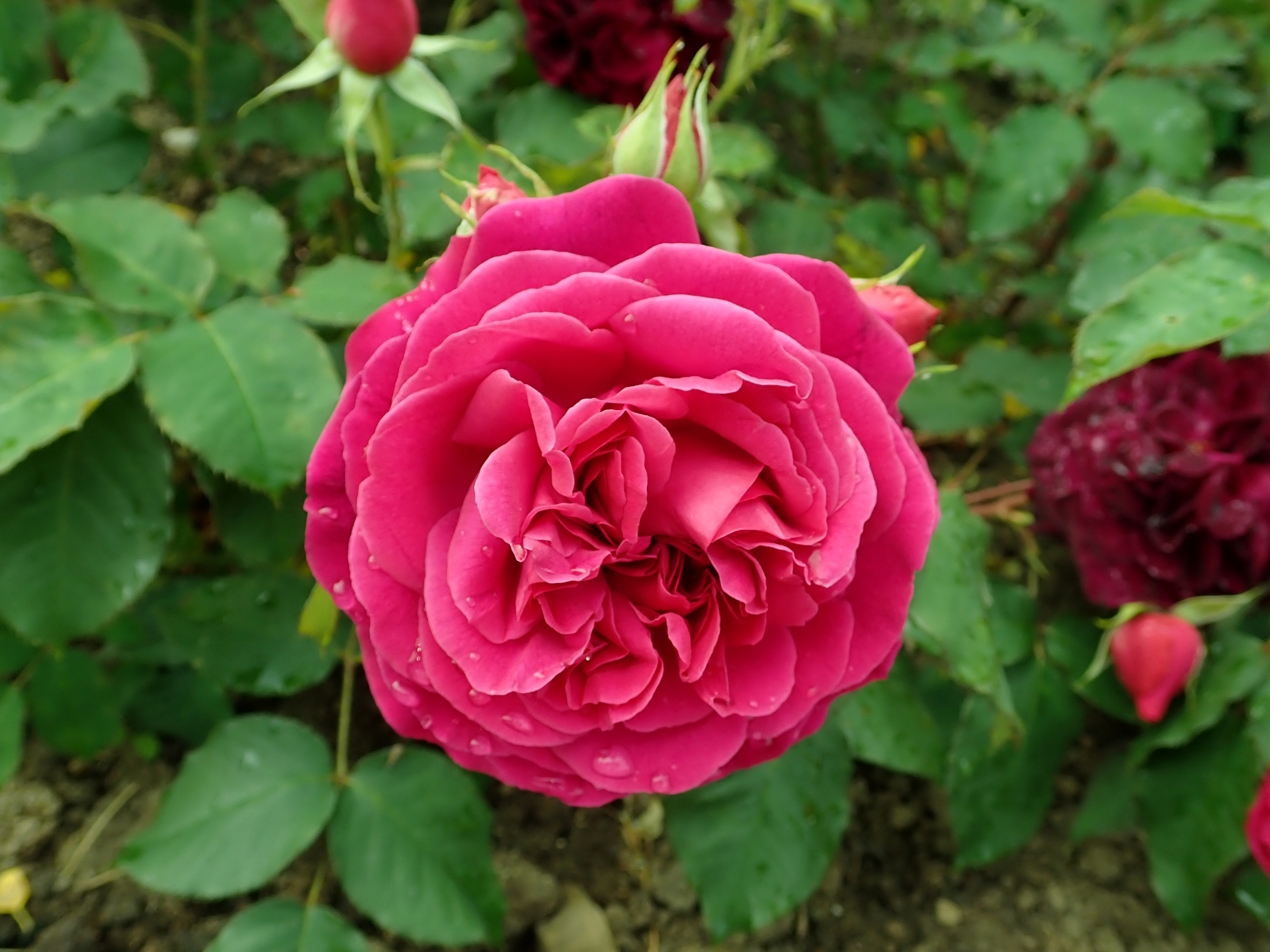
- Rosa Munstead Wood'
- Genus: Rosa hybrid
- Cultivar group: Shrub rose
- Cultivar: 'AUSbernard'
- Breeder: David C. H. Austin
- Origin: Great Britain, 2007

Rosa 'Munstead Wood' (aka AUSbernard) is a dark red shrub rose cultivar, bred by British rose breeder David C. H. Austin, and introduced into the UK by David Austin Roses Limited (UK) in 2007. The cultivar was named after horticulturalist and garden designer Gertrude Jekyll's home, Munstead Wood, in Surrey, England. The rose was awarded the Award of Garden Merit (AGM) by the British Royal Horticultural Society (RHS) in 2007 and an American Garden Rose Selections (AGRS) Fragrance Award, in 2017.

== Description ==
'Munstead Wood' is a short, bushy spreading rose, 2 to 3 ft (0.61–0.91 m) in height, with a 2 to 3 ft (0.61–0.91 m) spread. The plant is a vigorous grower. The rose has a strong, old rose fragrance. Its flowers are average in size, 3.75 in (95 mm), with a cupped, old rose bloom form. Flower colour is a deep, crimson with lighter coloured outer petals. 'Munstead Wood' blooms in small clusters throughout the season. Leaves are medium-sized and a matte, medium green colour.

== History ==
=== David Austin roses ===
David C. H. Austin (1926–2018) was an award-winning rose breeder, nursery owner and writer from Shropshire, England. When he was young, he was attracted to the beauty of old garden roses, especially the Gallicas, the Centifolias and the Damasks, which were popular in nineteenth century France. Austin began breeding roses in the 1950s with the goal of creating new shrub rose varieties that would possess the best qualities of old garden roses while incorporating the long flowering characteristics of hybrid tea roses and floribundas.

His first commercially successful rose cultivar was 'Constance Spry', which he introduced in 1961. He created a new, informal class of roses in the 1960s, which he named "English Roses". Austin's roses are generally known today as "David Austin Roses". Austin attained international commercial success with his new rose varieties. Some of his most popular roses include 'Wife of Bath' (1969), 'Graham Thomas' (1983), 'Abraham Darby' (1985) and 'Gertrude Jekyll' (1986).

=== 'Munstead Wood' ===
Austin developed 'Munstead Wood' from a cross between two unnamed parents. The new cultivar was introduced into the UK by David Austin Roses Limited (UK) in 2007. It was named after the horticulturalist and garden designer Gertrude Jekyll's home, Munstead Wood, in Surrey, England. The rose was awarded the Award of Garden Merit (AGM) by the British Royal Horticultural Society (RHS) in 2007 and an American Garden Rose Selections (AGRS) Fragrance Award, in 2017.
