= Tree of Life (White) =

Public sculpture in Milwaukee, Wisconsin

- Artist: Nancy Metz White
- Year: 2002
- Location: Mitchell Boulevard Park, Milwaukee; 43°2′11.203″N 87°58′41.063″W

Tree of Life is a public artwork by American artist Nancy Metz White, located at the north end of Mitchell Boulevard Park, a Milwaukee County Park in Milwaukee, Wisconsin. It is located near Miller Park. Unveiled in 2002, Tree of Life is constructed out of recycled steel from industry processes. It stands 2½ stories tall, and is brightly painted. White intended for the sculpture to become a place for Milwaukee locals to gather and forge new community ties.

== Description ==
Tree of Life is a 2½ story tall, welded steel sculpture. The steel was sourced from industrial waste. The entire sculpture is brightly colored, the tree trunk and branches being a bright blue-green, with orange, red, yellow, and green leaves. The steel leaves are made from welded-together flashings left over from machinery forging.
