= Magic Grove =

Artwork by Nancy Metz White

- Artist: Nancy Metz White
- Year: 2006
- Type: painted steel
- Location: Enderis Playfield; Milwaukee, Wisconsin; 43°4′16.967″N 88°0′4.656″W
- Owner: City of Milwaukee

Magic Grove is a public art work by artist Nancy Metz White. It is located in Enderis Playfield, which is northwest of downtown Milwaukee, Wisconsin. It was installed in November 2006 and dedicated in May 2007.

== Description ==
Magic Grove consists of three brightly painted trees made of salvaged metal, a brick walkway and artist-designed benches. The trunks of the trees are made of steel plate, and the canopies are a collage of reclaimed forge flashings painted in greens, blues, reds and yellows. The flashings are welded to create a smooth surface across each tree canopy, interrupted occasionally by orange bird forms that jut vertically and perpendicularly from the top of each sculpture. The three trees are set into a circular plaza that is bright blue. Green and blue benches of varied sizes and heights surround the work.

== Commissioning process ==
The project received funding initially through the Milwaukee Arts Board as part of a larger, two-year effort to renovate a recreational park managed by the Milwaukee Public Schools. Several neighborhood associations, local businesses and the Department of Public Works partnered to implement the renovation. The Enderis Park Neighborhood Association president said that partners "wanted a piece of art in the park to be the exclamation point on our joint effort." Neighbors and White collaborated to raise funds for the sculpture.
