= Whitnall Park =

Park in Milwaukee County, Wisconsin, United States of America

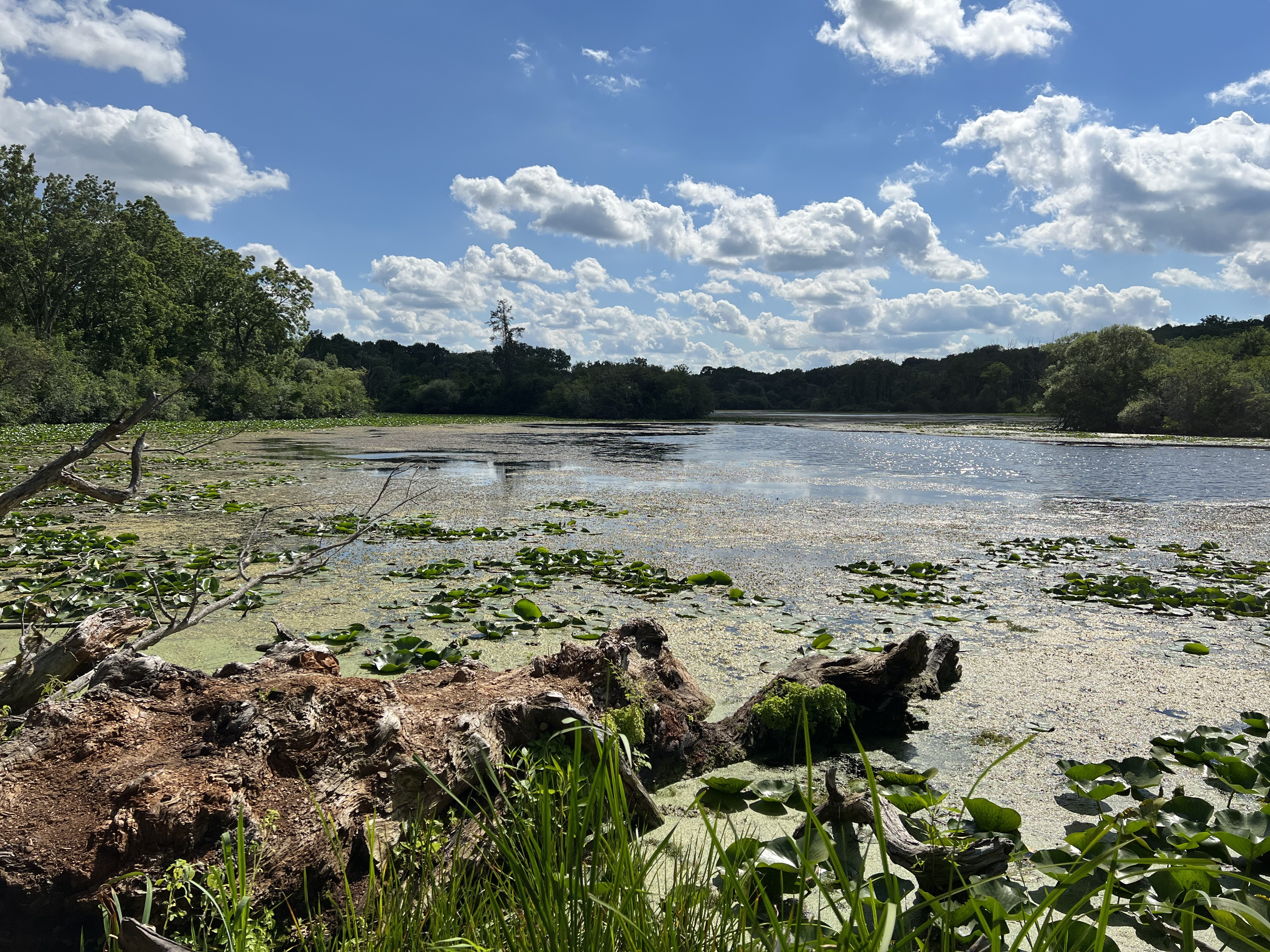
- Whitnall Park pond
- Interactive map of Whitnall Park
- Location: Hales Corners, Wisconsin
- Nearest city: Milwaukee
- Coordinates: 42.927°N 88.034°W
- Area: 640 acres (260 ha)
- Created: 1924
- Status: Open

Whitnall Park is the largest park in Milwaukee County, Wisconsin. It is located in Hales Corners, Wisconsin. The park was named for Charles B. Whitnall. Major work in the park was completed during the Great Depression through the Public Works Administration.

== History ==
The planning for the park began in 1924. The park was named for Charles B. Whitnall. Whitnall was called the father of the Milwaukee County Park System. The plans for the park called for a golf course, picnic areas and an Arboretum. Many of park's structures, were constructed during the 1930s and much of the park labor was provided by the Civilian Conservation Corps program. Much of the landscaping was completed between 1935 and 1927 by The National Youth Association. The group was active in the park, working on the gardens and picnic areas.

The park is 640 acres (260 ha) and it was originally called Hales Corners Park. The park covers one square mile, making it Milwaukee County's largest park.

== Park features ==
- Boerner Botanical Gardens which were named for Alfred Boerner: the designer of the original gardens.
- Wehr Nature Center which is a 220 acre section of protected land in Whitnall Park.
- The park contains the state's oldest sugar maples (270 years) and other unique trees.
- A portion of the Oak Leaf Trail Whitnall Loop runs through the park.

== See also ==
- Parks of Milwaukee
