= Wehr Nature Center =

Nature preserve in Franklin, Wisconsin

Coordinates: 42.9252°N 88.0360°W

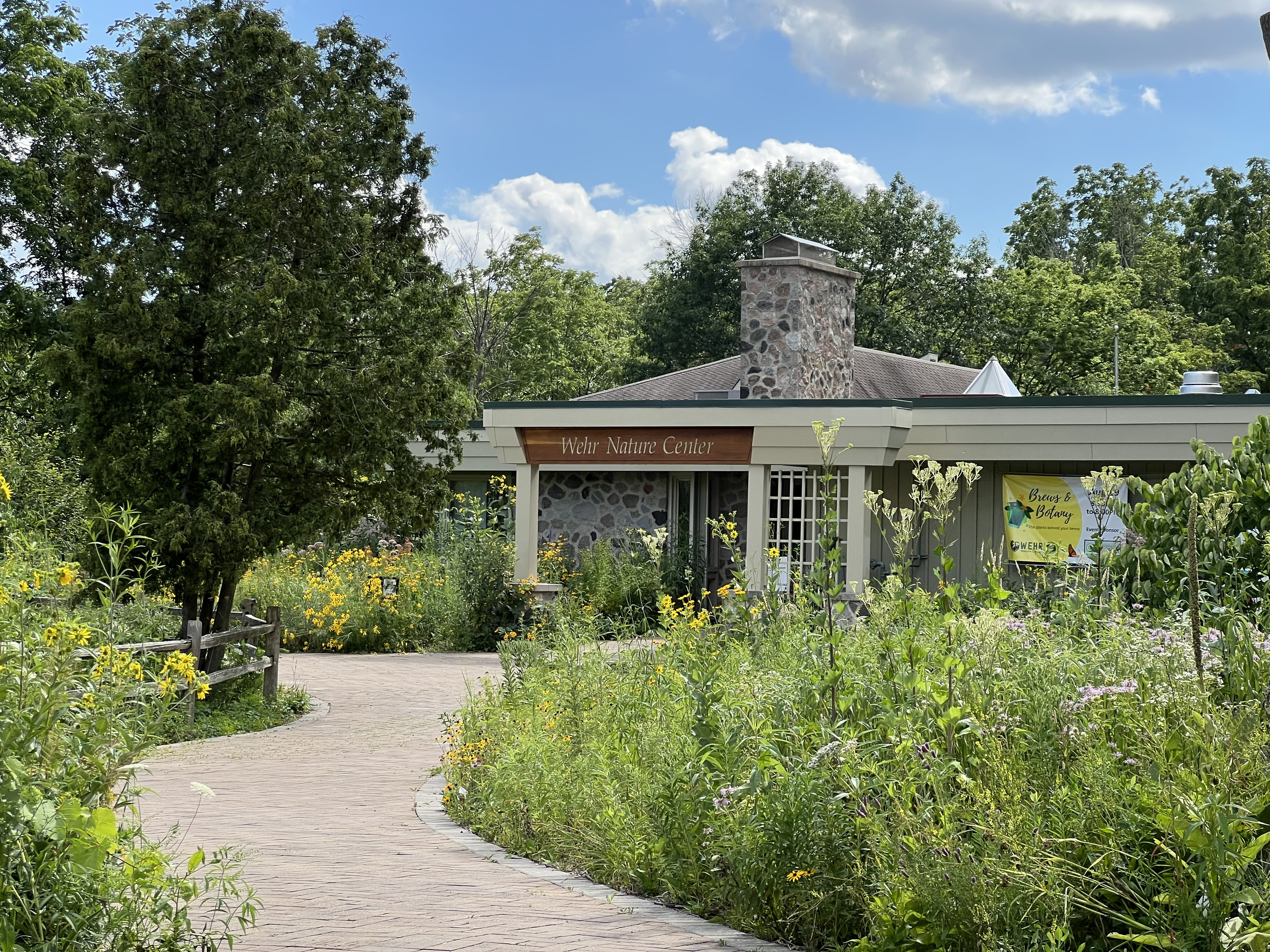
- Nature center building

- Location within Wisconsin
- Location: 9701 W. College Ave. Franklin, WI 53132 Franklin, Wisconsin
- Area: 220 acres (89 ha)
- Established: 1974

Wehr Nature Center is a 220-acre (89 ha) nature preserve located in Franklin, Wisconsin. It is part of Whitnall Park. It was named for philanthropist Todd Wehr whose foundation donated US$200,000 to help build the center.

== History ==
The center opened in 1974 and was made possible by a US$200,000 grant from the Todd Wehr Foundation along with federal and state grants. The nature center was built on the site of a livestock trading center.

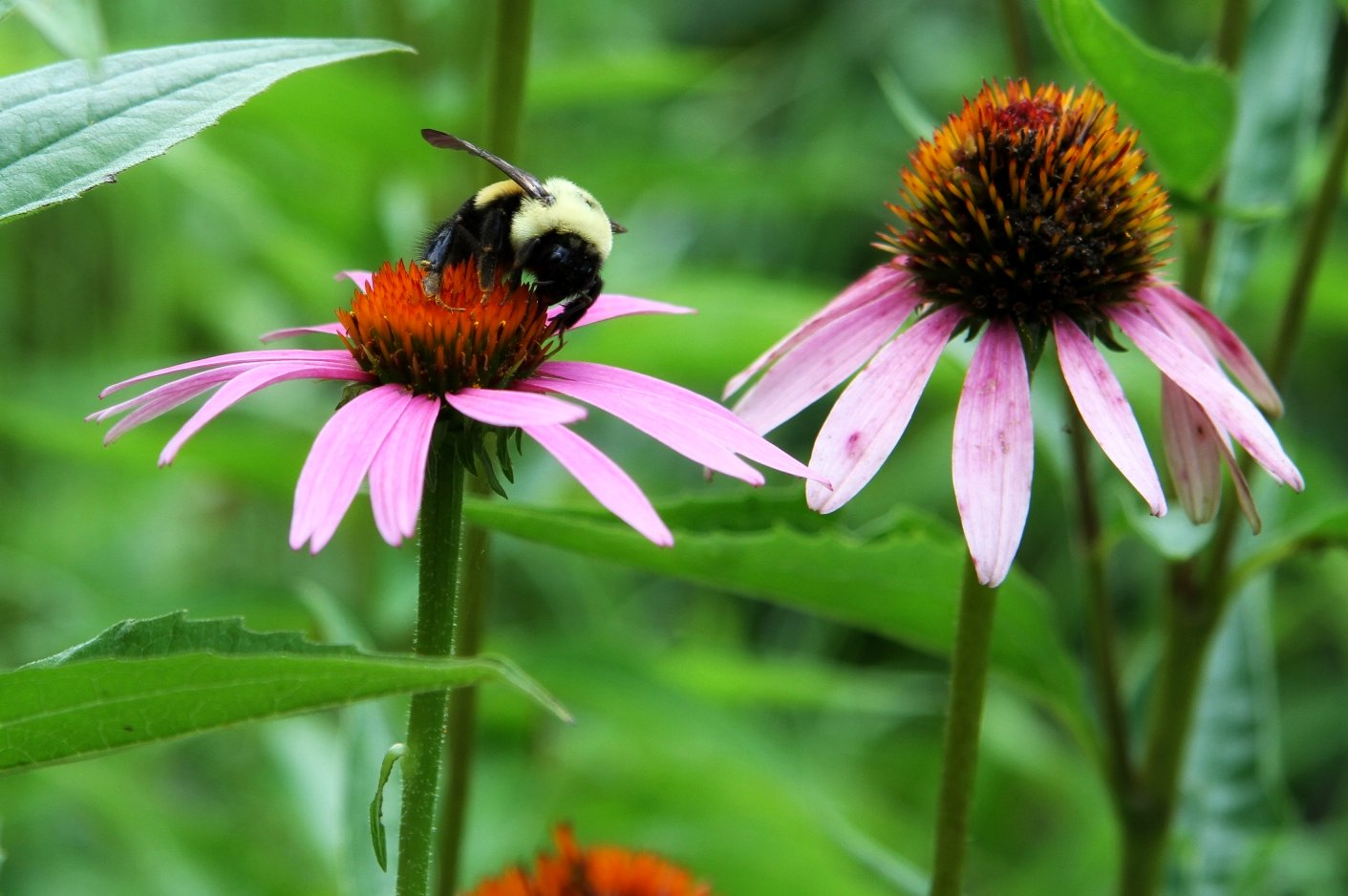
Wehr Nature Center image of a bumble bee on a flower

In 2018, organizations raised funds to update the nature center to accommodate people with disabilities. Bathrooms, a boardwalk and a viewing deck were included in the updates to make the center more wheelchair accessible.

== Description ==
The nature center is 220 acres of protected land inside of Whitnall Park. The Milwaukee County Park System states that visitors may not ride bicycles, or fish, or use any watercraft within the nature center. They also do not allow pets. There is a 2.8 mile trail for hikers which goes through the center. The trail passes Mallard Lake and passes a boardwalk and observation deck. The trail is made of wood chips and it passes the scenic elements of the park.
