= American Garden Rose Selections =

Annual American rose award

The American Garden Rose Selections (AGRS) is an annual award sponsored by the American rose industry to acknowledge and recommend outstanding rose varieties for different regions of the United States. AGRS replaced the long-established All-America Rose Selections, which was discontinued after 2012. AGRS's first annual award was introduced in 2016. The AGRS selection process involves rose trials in multiple regional test gardens throughout the U.S. Promising rose varieties are grown and evaluated multiple times a year for two years. Only 4% of all the roses tested in the program are selected for the AGRS award.

== History ==
The American Garden Rose Selections (AGRS) is an award given annually by the American rose industry to outstanding new rose varieties. AGRS has replaced the All-America Rose Selections Award (1938–2012), considered to be the most prestigious rose award in the U.S. In 2012, representatives from many professional rose organizations came together during "the Great Rosarians of the World" lecture series being held in New York City. They discussed the establishment of a new, more rigorous national rose trial program, one that would identify and recommend the best roses to gardeners who lived in different regions in the U.S.

The group decided that the new rose trial test program should more selective than the previous AARS testing program, and require stricter maintenance standards for the AGRS test gardens. Only about 4% of the roses tested in the AARS program are chosen for the AGRS award. The first award winners were introduced in 2016.

== Rose trials and selection process ==
The AGRS selection process consists of rose trials at multiple regional test gardens throughout the U.S. Many of the test gardens are located in botanical gardens that are usually open to the public. Promising rose varieties that are submitted to the AGRS program are grown and tested in official test gardens for two years in six different geographical regions. Each region has two test gardens. The roses are evaluated five times each growing season by rose experts. One of the primary goals of the program is the selection of rose varieties that are disease resistant and easy to care for. Evaluators also search for hardiness, excellent flowering, attractiveness, repeat bloom habit, foliage health, plant habit, and fragrance.

The AGRS official trial test gardens include: the Chicago Botanic Garden in Glencoe, Illinois, Edisto Memorial Garden in Orangeburg, South Carolina, Mesa Community College Rose Garden in Mesa, Arizona, the Ag Center Botanic Gardens in Baton Rouge, Louisiana, Portland International Test Garden in Portland, Oregon, Queens Botanical Garden in New York City, and Boerner Botanical Gardens in Milwaukee County, Wisconsin.

== Selected AGRS winners ==
- 'Belinda's Blush' (Antique Rose Emporium), 2020
- 'Brindabella Purple Prince', (Sylvia and John Gray), 2021
- 'Celestial Night', (Weeks Roses), 2022
- 'Coral Knockout',(Star Roses and Plants) 2018
- 'Dee-lish' (Meilland), 2016
- 'Easy on the Eyes' (Tom Carruth), 2022
- 'Easy to Please', (Christian Bedard), 2021
- 'Faith Whittlesey', ( M.S. Viraraghavan), 2017
- 'Lady of Shalott' (David Austin), 2017
- 'Lemon Fizz', (Kordes), 2020
- 'Look-A-Likes', (William Radler), 2019
- 'Icecap', (William Radler), 2017
- 'Munstead Wood', (David Austin), 2017
- 'Peachy Keen', (William Radler), 2017
- 'Pink Freedom', (Weeks Roses), 2022
- 'Pretty Polly' (Star Roses), 2022
- 'Sweet Spirit', (Meilland), 2021
- 'Tahitian Treasure', (William Radler), 2017
- 'Tequila Gold', (Meilland), 2019
- 'Tequila Supreme', (Meilland), 2019
- 'Thomas Affleck', (Rose Emporium), 2016
- 'Top Gun', (Tom Carruth), 2021
- 'Wedding Bells', (Kordes), 2020

== AGRS gallery ==
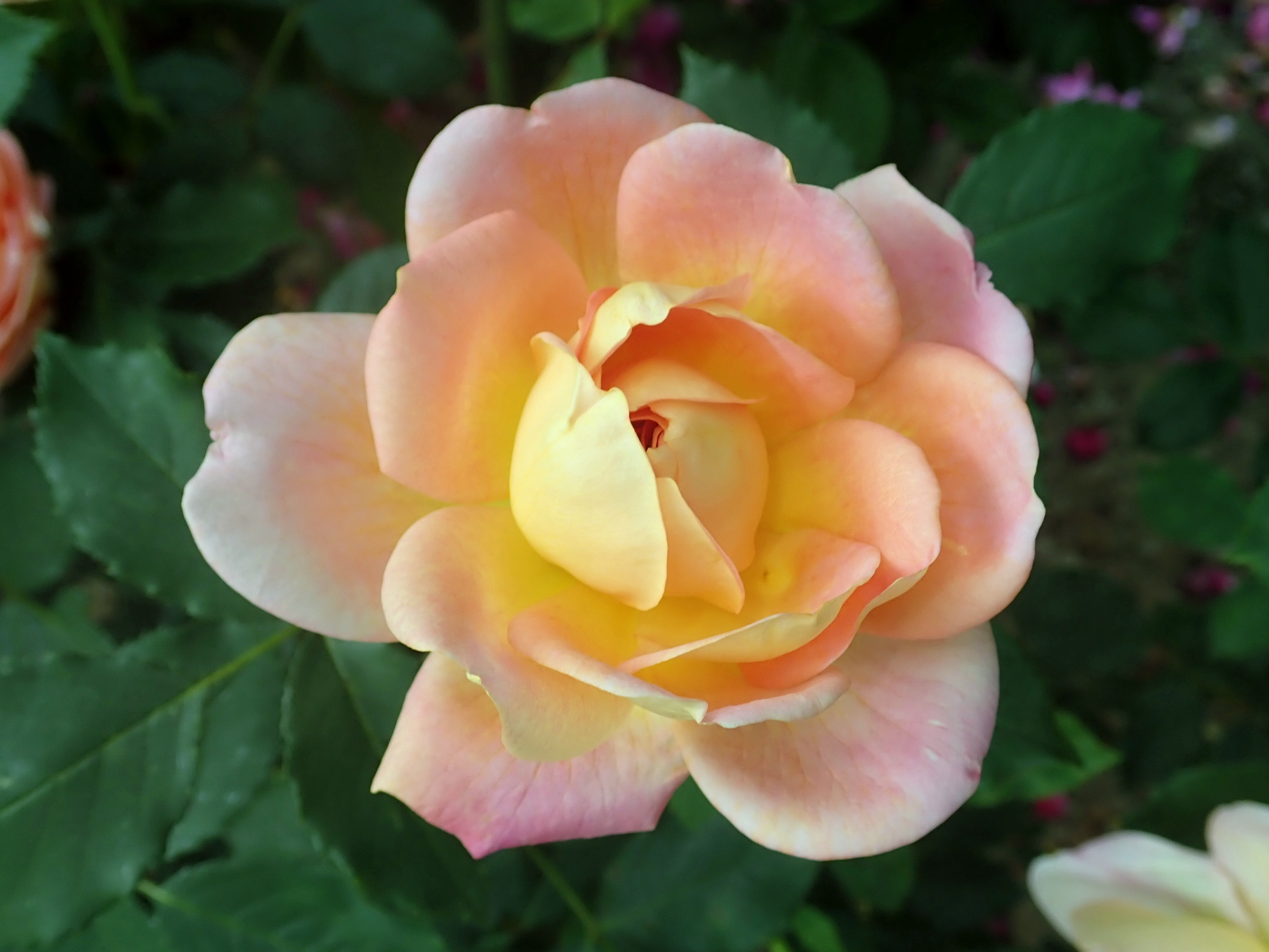
'Lady of Shalott'

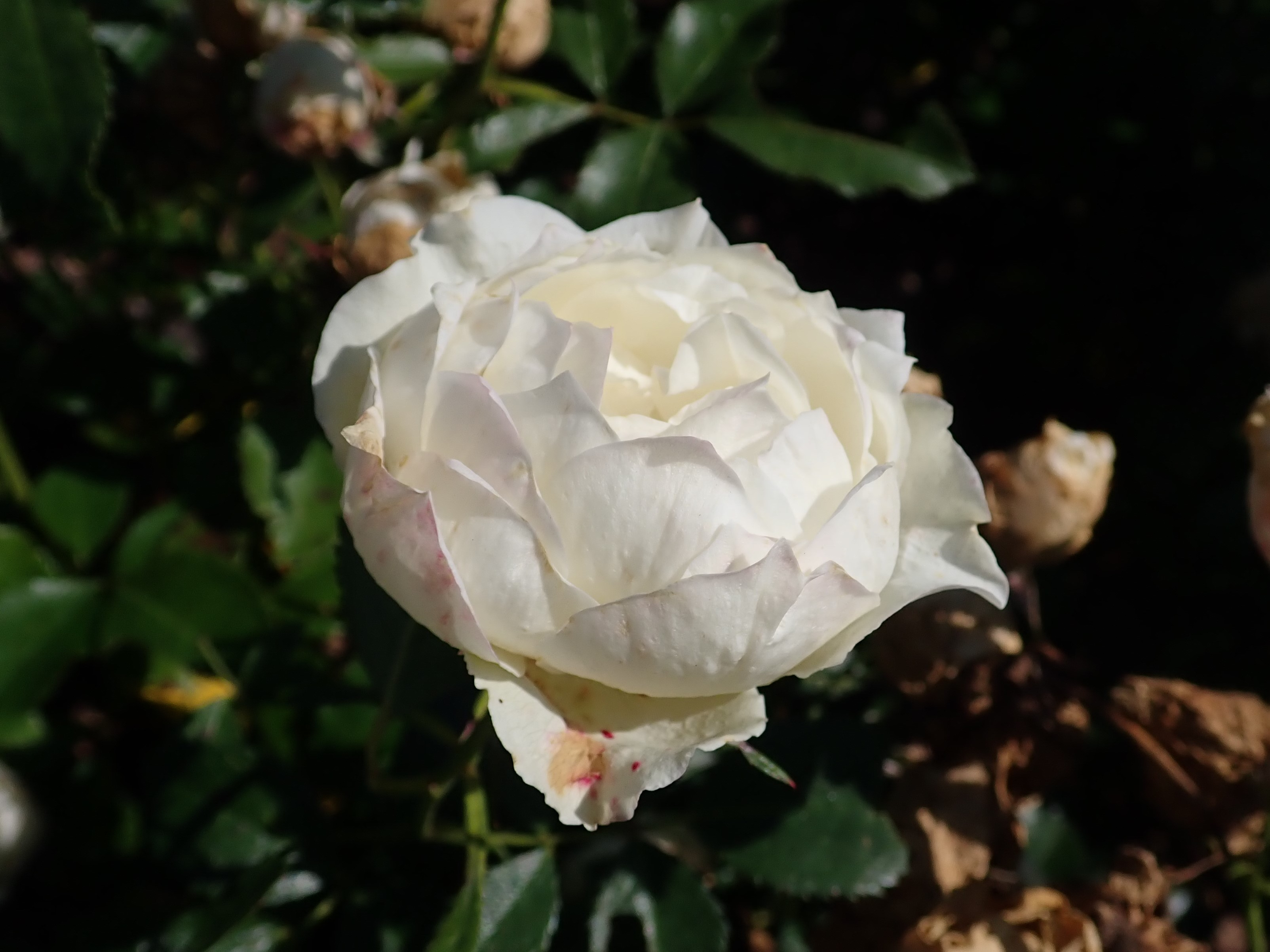
'Icecap'

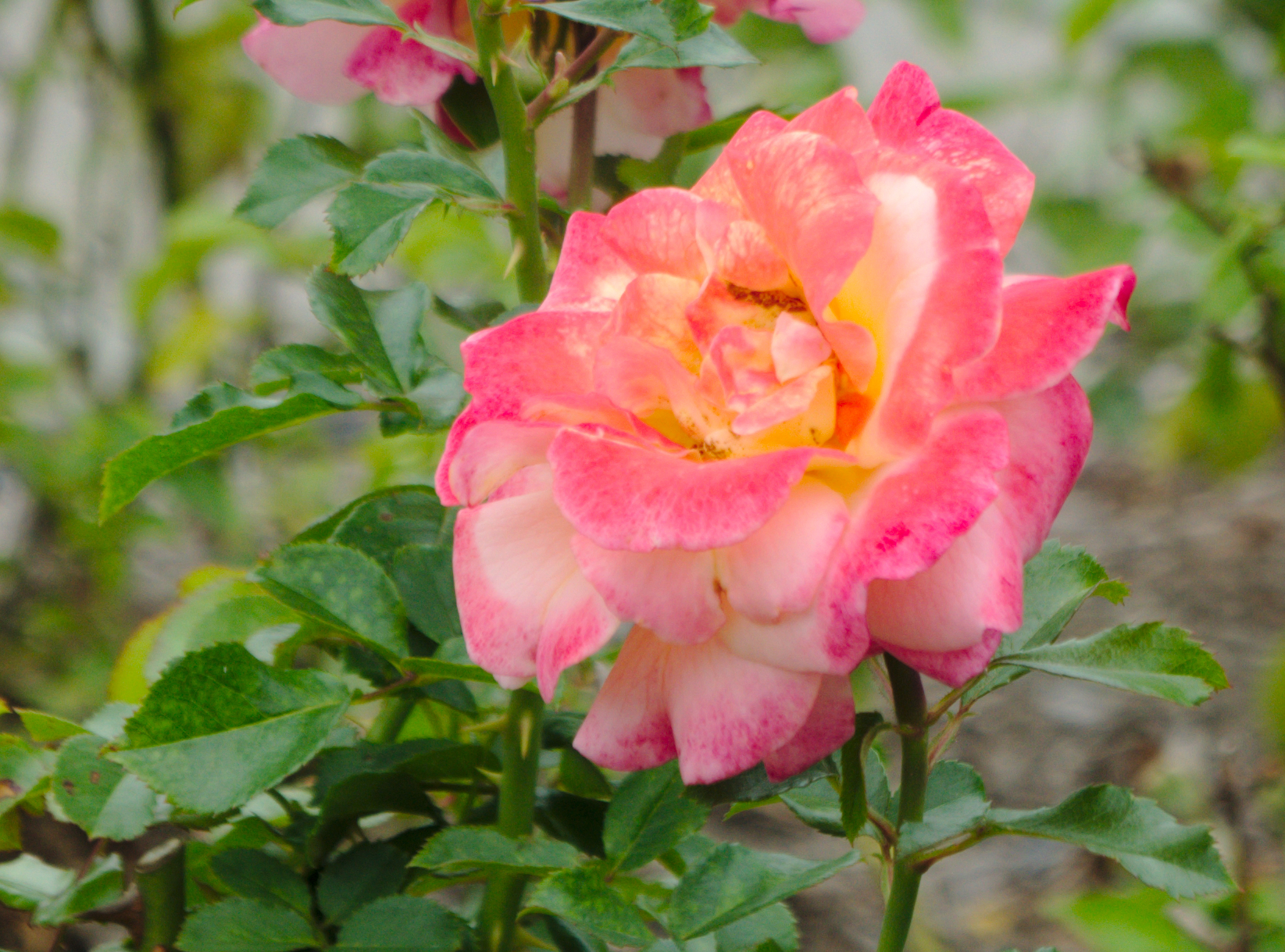
'Lemon Fizz'

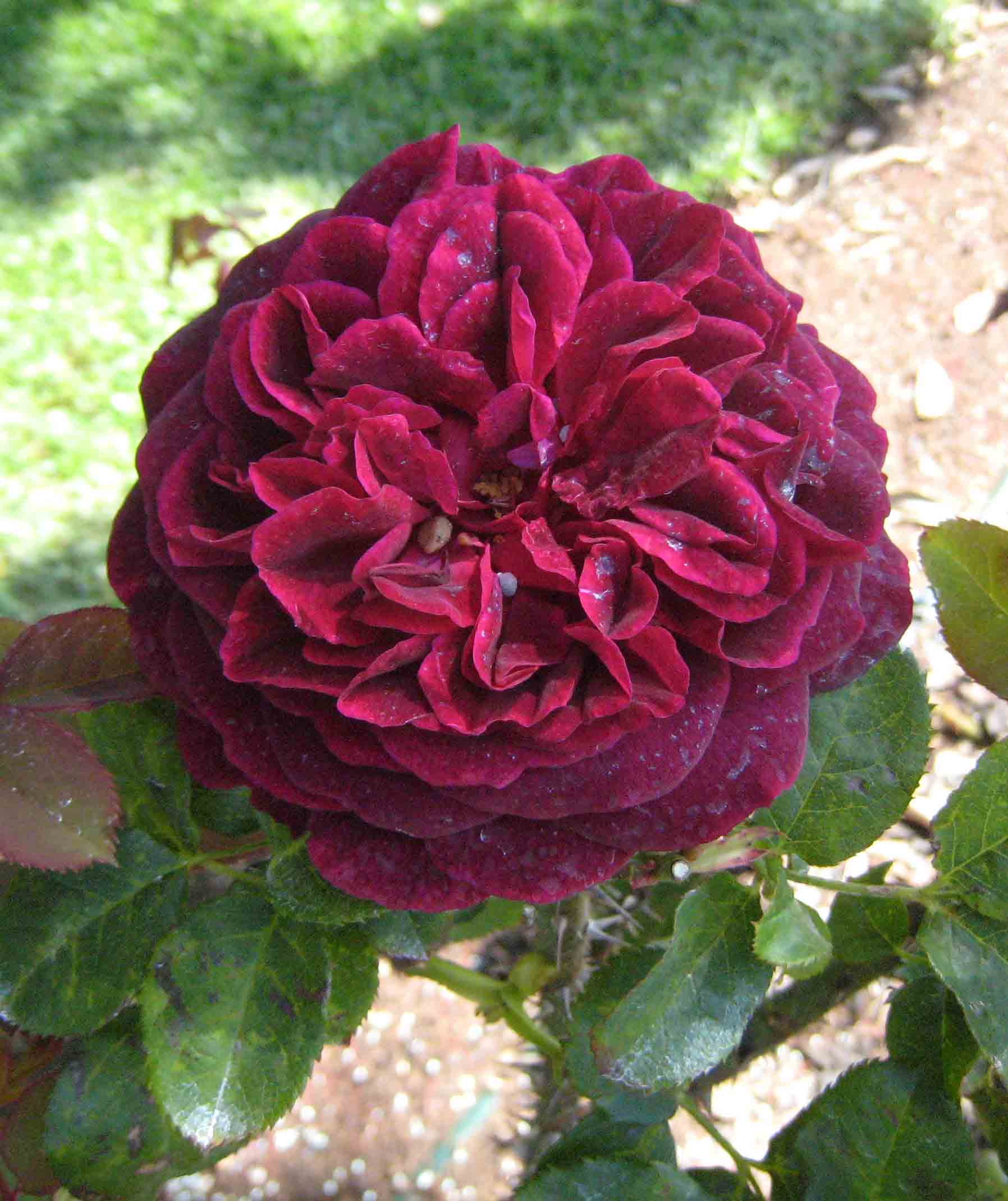
'Munstead Wood'
