= List of parks in Milwaukee =

Most parks in Milwaukee are owned and maintained by Milwaukee County as part of a county-wide system. However, some parks are administered by other entities, such as the state of Wisconsin, the city of Milwaukee, or neighborhood organizations.

== Parks in Milwaukee County park system ==
The Milwaukee County Park system was awarded the 2009 National Gold Medal Award "for excellence in the field of park and recreation management" by the National Recreation and Park Association.

Park	Address	Size	Notes	Photo
Alcott	3751 S 97 St	16.9-acre (68,000 m^{2})		
Algonquin	7850 N 51 St	9.4-acre (38,000 m^{2})	This park, located in Brown Deer, Wisconsin, has historically been a neighborhood park. Located adjacent to Algonquin Elementary School (now demolished), Algonquin Park is the home of a playground and wading pool.	
Armour	6105 W Norwich Ave	14.6-acre (59,000 m^{2})		
Atkinson	936 W Atkinson Ave	1.3-acre (5,300 m^{2})		
Back Bay	2315 E Back Bay	6.5-acre (26,000 m^{2})	Overlooks Lake Michigan	
Baran	2600 S Chase Ave	23.8-acre (96,000 m^{2})	Baran Park has primarily been a baseball park, housing several ball diamonds. Nestled between the freeway and the neighborhoods of Bay View, Baran Park has provided a quiet island adjacent to several highly populated areas on Milwaukee's south side.	
Barnard	3300 W Barnard Ave	10.1-acre (41,000 m^{2})	Adjacent to Greenfield Middle School	
Bay View	3120 S Lake Dr	37.5-acre (152,000 m^{2})		Bay View Park along the Oak Leaf Trail
Beckum	900 W. Brown St			
Bender	4503 E Ryan Rd	302.7-acre (1,225,000 m^{2})		
Big Bay	5000 N Lake Dr	8.7-acre (35,000 m^{2})		
Bradford	2400 N Lincoln Memorial Dr	29.0-acre (117,000 m^{2})	Beach volleyball courts along Lake Michigan	
Brown Deer	7835 N Green Bay Rd	362.6-acre (1,467,000 m^{2})	Location of the Brown Deer Park Golf Course and since 1994, the U.S. Bank Championship. Golf course designed by George Hansen in 1929.	
Burns Commons	1300 N Franklin Pl	1.5-acre (6,100 m^{2})	The original site (called "First Ward Triangle") was donated to the City of Milwaukee by a real estate developer named James H. Rogers in 1847, making it one of the oldest parks in the city. The city soon changed the name to Franklin Park, the later renamed the park in honor of Scottish poet Robert Burns, to whom there is statue.	
Butterfly	37th and Meinecke Ave			
Caesar's	1939 N Warren Ave	3.7-acre (15,000 m^{2})	Southern end of the "east bank trail" on the East Side, adjacent to the east bank of the Milwaukee River and the former North Avenue dam. Site was originally acquired by the City of Milwaukee Water Department in 1889 and was named Milwaukee River Dam Park. In 1929, it was transferred to the city's parks department and named Caesar's Park in honor of Caesar Paikowski. In 1997, the city of Milwaukee removed the central section of the North Avenue dam, allowing the water to flow faster.	
Cambridge Woods	Cambridge & Providence	20.9-acre (85,000 m^{2})	Located in Milwaukee's East Side neighborhood, west of University of Wisconsin–Milwaukee, along the Milwaukee River.	
Cannon	303 N 95 St	8.5-acre (34,000 m^{2})		
Carver	911 W Brown St	23.2-acre (94,000 m^{2})	A portion of the current site has a history of park use which dates back to 1853. At that point in time, Quentin's Park, a private facility, occupied the site of what is now Roosevelt Middle School plus much of the southerly part of Carver Park. In 1879 this land was sold to the Joseph Schlitz Brewing Company and Schlitz Park (a popular beer garden) was created. Through the 1940s, the park was called Lapham Park and featured the Lapham Memorial.	
Cathedral Square	520 E Wells St	2.1-acre (8,500 m^{2})	The exact site of Milwaukee's second courthouse (1873–1931), as well as neighboring land to the first courthouse, which was just north of the park. Next to St. John's Cathedral and location of "Jazz in the Park," an outdoor summer concert series.	
Center Street	6420 W Clarke St	4.5-acre (18,000 m^{2})		
Chippewa	11500 Park Hill Ave	10.5-acre (42,000 m^{2})		
Clarke Square	2330 W Vieau Pl	2.1-acre (8,500 m^{2})	Donated in 1837 by Nathaniel Brown and Norman and Lydia Clarke, who at the time were real estate developers in the area.	
Clas	930 W Wells St	1.0-acre (4,000 m^{2})	Located adjacent to the south entrance of the Milwaukee County Courthouse. The Park Commission acquired the land (which had been a parking lot) from the County Board in 1967. A fountain was added during redevelopment of the space in the 1980s. The park was named after Alfred C. Clas, a prominent architect and planner who also served as a County Park Commissioner (1907–1917)	
Columbus, Indigenous Peoples'	7301 W Courtland Ave	10.4-acre (42,000 m^{2})		
Cooper	8701 W Chambers St	8.4-acre (34,000 m^{2})	Named for William H. Cooper who served as a member of the Milwaukee County Parks Commission from 1948 to 1955, the park contains a rental pavilion, softball diamonds, a play structure, and a wading pool. The Friends of Cooper Park partner with the county for park improvements, volunteer activities, and community events.	Photo of the Cooper Park pavilion from SE
Copernicus	2150 W Klein Ave	20.3-acre (82,000 m^{2})		
Cudahy	3000 E Ramsey Ave	17.6-acre (71,000 m^{2})		
Cudahy Nature Preserve	501 E College Ave	42.2-acre (171,000 m^{2})		
Cupertino	2000 E Iron St	7.1-acre (29,000 m^{2})	Named after County Supervisor Daniel Cupertino, this area was previously the northernmost portion of Southshore Park.	Looking North into Cupertino Park View of Lake Michigan from Cupertino Park
Currie	3535 N Mayfair Rd	195.7-acre (792,000 m^{2})	Golf course designed by George Hansen in 1927.	
Dineen	6901 W Vienna Ave	64.2-acre (260,000 m^{2})	Located on the northwest side of Milwaukee, the park land was first acquired in 1951, with major developments in the 1960s. Named in honor of Cornelius R. Dineen, Park Commissioner (1927–1955).	
Doctors	1870 E Fox Ln	54.8-acre (222,000 m^{2})	Overlooks Lake Michigan; adjoins Schlitz Audubon Nature Center	
Doyne	5300 W Wells St	35.4-acre (143,000 m^{2})		
Dretzka	12020 W Bradley Rd	326.0-acre (1,319,000 m^{2})	The majority of park land was acquired in 1956. The park was named after Jerome C. Dretzka, a member of the Park Commission (1920–1963). The 210-acre (0.85 km^{2}) golf course opened in 1964. Other facilities include a golf driving range, picnic areas, sand volleyball, a multi-use athletic field, a disc golf course, a segment of the Oak Leaf Trail, and a groomed cross-country ski trail.	
Estabrook	4400 N Estabrook Dr	122.0-acre (494,000 m^{2})	Located along the easterly bank of the Milwaukee River between Hampton Ave and Capitol Drive. Initial acquisition of land for the park started in 1916. Significant development took place in the early and mid-1930s, led in part by the Civilian Conservation Corps. The historic Benjamin Church House—built by pioneer builder Benjamin F. Church—was moved to the park in 1938. The WITI TV Tower is also located within the park.	
Euclid	3200 S 88 St	9.1-acre (37,000 m^{2})		
Falk	2013 W Rawson Ave	215.8-acre (873,000 m^{2})		
Franklin	10400 W Oakwood Rd	164.5-acre (666,000 m^{2})		
Froemming	8801 S 51 St	16.9-acre (68,000 m^{2})		
Garden Homes Square	2600 W Atkinson Ave	1.8-acre (7,300 m^{2})		
Gilman Triangle	2475 N Lake Dr	0.4-acre (1,600 m^{2})		
Gordon	2828 N Humboldt Blvd	25.0-acre (101,000 m^{2})	The City of Milwaukee purchased the site for Gordon Park in 1907. In 1937, it was turned over to Milwaukee County as part of the consolidation of parks.	
Grant	100 E Hawthorne Ave	379.3-acre (1,535,000 m^{2})	Located in South Milwaukee, established in 1911 after Horace Fowle's sale of farm land.	Grant Park Fall 2011
Granville Dog Park	11718 W Good Hope Pl	25.4-acre (103,000 m^{2})	Milwaukee County's first dog park. Established in 1998, Granville Dog Park sits in what was once the town of Granville before it was annexed by the City of Milwaukee. Originally created by a combination of political leaders and a non-profit group, Partners in Parks, Granville Dog Park is now run exclusively by the Milwaukee County Parks department.	
Greene	4235 S Lipton Ave	36.5-acre (148,000 m^{2})		
Greenfield Park	2028 S 124 St @ W Greenfield Ave	282.3-acre (1,142,000 m^{2})	Located in West Allis at the source of both the Root River and Underwood Creek. The majority of land for the park was acquired in 1921. The golf course, designed by George Hansen, opened in 1923. The park's pool became the county's first outdoor swimming pool when it opened in 1932.	
Grobschmidt	3751 W College Ave	152.0-acre (615,000 m^{2})	Composed of oak-hickory woodland, sedge meadow, and a six-acre pond named Mud Lake. Formerly used by Native Americans and is virtually undeveloped except for the park sign and walking trail.	
Hales Corners	5765 S New Berlin Rd	33.1-acre (134,000 m^{2})		
Hansen	9800 W Underwood Creek Pkwy	51.4-acre (208,000 m^{2})		
A.C. Hanson	9100 N Maura Ln	13.5-acre (55,000 m^{2})	This small park in Brown Deer houses a great playground.	
Hart	7300 Chestnut Street Wauwatosa, WI 53213	19.5-acre (79,000 m^{2})		
Hartung	3266 Menomonee River Parkway Wauwatosa, WI 53222	.28-acre (1,100 m^{2})		
Hawthorne Glen	1130 North 60th Street	23-acre (93,000 m^{2})	Nature center museum, live native animals, ¾ mile self-guided nature trail, picnic areas	
Highland	4000 W Highland Blvd	3.4-acre (14,000 m^{2})		
Holler	5151 S 6 St	15.4-acre (62,000 m^{2})		
Holt	3300 S 106 St	20.6-acre (83,000 m^{2})	Undeveloped park located in Greenfield.	
Hoyt	1800 Swan Blvd	20.0-acre (81,000 m^{2})		
Humboldt	3000 S Howell Ave	70.2-acre (284,000 m^{2})	One of the city's first parks, opened in 1891. In 1900, it was named to honor Friedrich Wilhelm Heinrich Alexander Freiherr von Humboldt.	
Jackson	3500 W Forest Home Ave	113.0-acre (457,000 m^{2})	First named Reynolds Grove in 1907, renamed in honor of Andrew Jackson in 1910. The park contains the Statue of Commerce or "The Pewter Lady." This statue by sculptor Gustav Haug had originally stood over the entrance of the Chamber of Commerce building in downtown from 1880 until 1909.	
Jacobus	6501 W Hillside Ln	26.0-acre (105,000 m^{2})	The original name of the site was Sholes Park in honor of Christopher Sholes. In 1932, the site was renamed in recognition of the role Charles C. Jacobus, a former county supervisor from Wauwatosa, had in development of the park system.	
Johnsons	1919 W Fond du Lac Ave	13.2-acre (53,000 m^{2})		
Johnstone	6750 S 24 St	12.7-acre (51,000 m^{2})		
Joseph Lichter	N Swan Rd & W Fairy Chasm Dr	33.7-acre (136,000 m^{2})		
Juneau	801 N Lincoln Memorial Dr	15.8-acre (64,000 m^{2})	Named after Solomon Juneau. Overlooks Lake Michigan just north of downtown. Originally under the jurisdiction of the public works department. The original park was a narrow strip of land along the bluff above a busy railroad depot.	
Kern	3614 N Humboldt Blvd	30.2-acre (122,000 m^{2})		
King	1531 W Vliet St	21.4-acre (87,000 m^{2})	Named after Martin Luther King Jr. The County Park Commission acquired park land in 1968 from the City of Milwaukee redevelopment agency. The community center opened in 1976, which continued to provide a range of programming.	
Kinnickinnic Sports Center	3070 S 20 St	20.0-acre (81,000 m^{2})		
Kletzsch	6560 N Milw. River Pkwy	140.5-acre (569,000 m^{2})	Adjacent to the Milwaukee River within the City of Glendale. Acquisition of land for the park began in 1918 when the 35-acre (140,000 m^{2}) Blatz farm was purchased. Named after Alvin P. Kletzsch, a member of the Park Commission (1907–1941). Archaeological studies done in the early 1930s indicated that a portion of the park once contained an Indian camp and burial ground.	
Kohl	7603 W County Line Rd	273.2-acre (1,106,000 m^{2})	Named after real estate developer, Sydney Kohl, this land was donated to Milwaukee County but has become undeveloped thus far. Previous to being named the land was called Park Site 71. An effort to explore development of the property was torpedoed by neighbors adjacent to the park in 2000 amid fears of what development could bring.	
Kops	3321 N 86 St	8.2-acre (33,000 m^{2})	Named in honor of Milwaukee County Supervisor, Gerald Henry Kops, the park is located near Mount Mary College. Attorney Kops received his undergraduate degree from NYU and his law degree from Marquette University. He served as Milwaukee County Supervisor for over 20 years in the 1930s nd 1940's. The park includes a wading pool, tot lot and 2 softball diamonds.	
Kosciuszko	2201 S 7 St	33.6-acre (136,000 m^{2})	The city acquired initial land in 1890 from J. C. Coleman, and the site was referred to as the Coleman Tract and Coleman Park. During the mid-1890s the site was renamed Lincoln Avenue Park and ultimately in 1900 it was named after General Tadeusz Kościuszko, to which there is a statue.	
Alan Kulwicki Memorial Park	10777 W Coldspring Rd	28.2-acre (114,000 m^{2})	Created in 1996 to honor NASCAR racecar driver, and Greenfield native, Alan Kulwicki	
La Follette	9418 W Washington St	18.4-acre (74,000 m^{2})		
Lake	3233 E Kenwood Blvd	138.1-acre (559,000 m^{2})	Designed by Frederick Law Olmsted. Location of the historic North Point Lighthouse, which was built in 1855.	
Lincoln	1301 W Hampton Ave	312.3-acre (1,264,000 m^{2})	Location of the television station transmitter tower for WISN-TV and the combined tower of Weigel Broadcasting's four area stations.	
Lindbergh	3629 N 16 St	3.0-acre (12,000 m^{2})		
Lindsay	4360 N 87 St	13.3-acre (54,000 m^{2})		
Lyons	3301 S 55 St	12.4-acre (50,000 m^{2})		
Madison	9800 W Glendale Ave	59.1-acre (239,000 m^{2})		
Maitland	6001 S 13 St	26.9-acre (109,000 m^{2})		
Manitoba	2941 S 49 St	3.7-acre (15,000 m^{2})		
McCarty	8214 W Cleveland Ave	52.1-acre (211,000 m^{2})	Located in West Allis. A segment of the Oak Leaf Trail cuts through this park.	
McGovern	5400 N 51 Blvd	61.0-acre (247,000 m^{2})	Initially called Silver Spring Park, later renamed in honor of William R. McGovern, the longest serving Park Commissioner (1919–1964). Initial acquisition of the land took place in 1910 when the Milwaukee County Board of Supervisors purchased acreage as part of the House of Corrections farm which was located in that area.	
McKinley	1750 N Lincoln Memorial Dr	103.3-acre (418,000 m^{2})		
Meaux	1904 W Villard Ave	25.8-acre (104,000 m^{2})		
Melody View Preserve	7300 N 91 St	13.9-acre (56,000 m^{2})	Prior to acquisition by Milwaukee County, this land was owned by MPS who sold the land to Walgreens who wanted to put a pharmacy on Good Hope Road. Amid neighborhood concerns, the County Supervisor at the time negotiated donation of the land between Walgreens and the Melody View Neighborhood. A walking path which was planned of the park was scrapped amid budget concerns in the late 1990s.	
Merrill	461 N 35 St	11.47-acre (46,400 m^{2})		
Metcalfe	3401 W. Meinecke Ave			
Mitchell	524 S Layton Blvd	61.0-acre (247,000 m^{2})	Location of the Mitchell Park Horticultural Conservatory.	
Mitchell Airport	4446 S Logan Ave	18.8-acre (76,000 m^{2})	Located just north of Milwaukee Mitchell International Airport.	
Mitchell Boulevard	5115 W Bluemound Rd	15.6-acre (63,000 m^{2})	The Tree of Life is at the North end of the park along Bluemound Rd.	
Moody	2200 W Burleigh St	4.1-acre (17,000 m^{2})		
Morgan Triangle	3404 S Kinnickinnic Ave	0.9-acre (3,600 m^{2})		
Nash	7800 W Nash St	9.3-acre (38,000 m^{2})		
Noyes	8235 W Good Hope Rd	71.6-acre (290,000 m^{2})	Housing a par 3 golf course, Noyes Park is a short course on Milwaukee's Northwest side. It also houses a great playground on the western part of the park.	
Oakwood	3600 W Oakwood Rd	276.0-acre (1,117,000 m^{2})	Initial acquisition of land for the park occurred in 1958, the rest was purchased by 1961. The 18-hole golf course (opened in 1971) occupies over one-half of the park and it is the county's longest course at approximately 7,000 yards.	
O'Donnell Park	E. Wisconsin Avenue & Prospect	9.3-acre (38,000 m^{2})	Has views of the lakefront and downtown skyline from benches and picnic tables. Home to the Betty Brinn Children's Museum, banquet facilities and plaza gardens used for weddings and other events. The park links the east end of Wisconsin Avenue and the "Calatrava" addition of the Milwaukee Art Museum through the Reiman Bridge. A great place to watch daily opening and closing of the Calatrava's white "wings" ("Burke Brise Soleil"), as well as fireworks and sunrises. North half of park was originally part of adjacent Juneau Park and dates back to 1868.	
Pere Marquette	900 N Plankinton Ave	1.9-acre (7,700 m^{2})	Directly west of the Marcus Center, across the Milwaukee River. The Milwaukee County Historical Society is at its western edge. The original development of the park was completed in 1976. The park is named in honor of Father (Père) Jacques Marquette. Hosts the annual River Splash festival.	
Pleasant Valley	1229 E Concordia Ave	23.1-acre (93,000 m^{2})		
Pompeii Square	Interstate 794 @ N Van Buren St & N Jackson St	0.4-acre (1,600 m^{2})	Location of Blessed Virgin of Pompeii Church (1904–1967), which stood west across N. Jackson St. from present-day Pompeii Square. The church (known as "the little pink church") was razed for freeway expansion in 1967.	
Popuch	8500 W Granville Rd	11.6-acre (47,000 m^{2})	This small, neighborhood park is a little green oasis with an ADA compliant playground.	
Prospect Triangle	Bradford & Maryland	0.6-acre (2,400 m^{2})		
Pulaski – Cudahy	5400 S Swift Ave	15.9-acre (64,000 m^{2})		
Pulaski–Milwaukee	2677 S 16 St	25.9-acre (105,000 m^{2})	Includes a bronze sculpture of Casimir Pulaski, a hero of the American Revolutionary War. The sculpture was created by Joseph Kiselewski, a Polish - American sculptor.	
Rainbow	700 S 119 St	25.9-acre (105,000 m^{2})		
Rawson	1400 E Rawson Ave	29.7-acre (120,000 m^{2})		
Red Arrow	920 N Water St	1.2-acre (4,900 m^{2})	Named in honor of the symbol for the 32nd Infantry Division. The original Red Arrow Park, between N 10th St and N 11th St south of Wisconsin Ave, was lost due to freeway construction. The county acquired the current site (just north of Milwaukee City Hall, east of the Marcus Center) in 1966 from the City of Milwaukee Redevelopment Authority. As part of recent redevelopment of the space, there is now a public outdoor ice-skating rink.	
Riverside	1500 E Riverside Pl	25.4-acre (103,000 m^{2})	Designed by Frederick Law Olmsted. Present-day location of the main offices of the Urban Ecology Center.	
Riverton Meadows	2800 E Honeysuckle Ave	12.1-acre (49,000 m^{2})		
Rose	3045 N Dr M L King Jr Dr	9.6-acre (39,000 m^{2})	Originally named after James A. Garfield in 1922. In the late 1970s, the park was renamed in honor of Clinton E. Rose who had served as a County Supervisor (1968–1977) and a Park Commissioner (1972–1976). It is home to the Clinton Rose Senior Center.	
Runway Dog Exercise Area	1214 E. Rawson Ave	26.2-acre (106,000 m^{2})		
Saveland	3700 S 2 St	3.3-acre (13,000 m^{2})		
Schoenecker	6237 N Hopkins St	17.5-acre (71,000 m^{2})		
Scout Lake	5902 W Loomis Rd	64.3-acre (260,000 m^{2})		
Servite Park Preserve	8501 N Servite Dr	20.2-acre (82,000 m^{2})	This land adjacent to the former site of a Servite Order Monastery, the intention of this land was to be a planted and established and undeveloped prairie. The trail, designed by the County Supervisor at the time, was inspired by landscape architect Frederick Law Olmsted Jr. Under a public-private partnership, the trail was built by WE energies in exchange for rights to access the power lines through the park.	
Sheridan	4800 S Lake Dr	131.8-acre (533,000 m^{2})	This park is operated by Milwaukee County Park in the City of Cudahy. It was originally donated to the city by Patrick Cudahy in 1914. It lies on a bluff overlooking Lake Michigan.	
Sherman	3000 N Sherman Blvd	20.7-acre (84,000 m^{2})		
Smith	5462 N 33 St	19.3-acre (78,000 m^{2})		
South Shore	2900 S Shore Dr	44.4-acre (180,000 m^{2})		View of Lake Michigan from South Shore Park
Southwood Glen	3180 W Hilltop Ave	8.9-acre (36,000 m^{2})		
Sports Complex	6000 W Ryan Rd	116.5-acre (471,000 m^{2})		
St Martin's	10705 W Robinwood Ln	19.3-acre (78,000 m^{2})		
Tiefenthaler	2501 W Galena St	10.6-acre (43,000 m^{2})		
Tippecanoe	1411 E Warnimont Ave	17.3-acre (70,000 m^{2})		
Trimborn Farm	8881 W Grange Ave	7.3-acre (30,000 m^{2})		
Uihlein Soccer Park	7101 W Good Hope Rd	67.2-acre (272,000 m^{2})	A soccer-specific stadium built in 1994, the Milwaukee Wave sometimes practices here.	
Valley	343 N 42 St	1.5-acre (6,100 m^{2})		
Veteran's	1010 N Lincoln Memorial Dr	103.5-acre (419,000 m^{2})	Just south of the McKinley Marina along Milwaukee's Lakefront.	
Vogel	8601 W Lancaster Ave	11.8-acre (48,000 m^{2})		
Wahl/Harriet Tubman	4750 N 48 St	12.4-acre (50,000 m^{2})		
Walker Square	1031 S 9 St	2.1-acre (8,500 m^{2})	Originally donated to the city by George H. Walker in 1836.	
Warnimont	5400 S Lake Dr	249.4-acre (1,009,000 m^{2})		
Washington Park	1859 N 40 St	128.5-acre (520,000 m^{2})	Designed by Frederick Law Olmsted in 1892. Originally named West Park, it was renamed Washington Park in 1900. It gradually became the location of the city's zoo in the late 1800s and continued there until 1963. A branch of the Urban Ecology Center opened in the park in 2007. The park also includes a bandshell designed by Fitzhugh Scott, which seats 8,500 people, and opened on August 23, 1938.	
Webster	4521 N Mayfair Rd	4.5-acre (18,000 m^{2})	Located just west of Mayfair Road, the park is owned by Milwaukee County and leased to the City of Wauwatosa. The Oak Leaf Trail runs through it.	
Wedgewood	7201 W Wedgewood Dr	6.1-acre (25,000 m^{2})		
Wehr Nature Center	9701 W College Ave	250-acre (1,000,000 m^{2})	Located near Boerner Botanical Gardens and Whitnall Park golf course.	
West Milwaukee	5000 W Burnham St	21.1-acre (85,000 m^{2})		
Whitnall Park	5879 S 92 St	625.4-acre (2,531,000 m^{2})	Location of the Boerner Botanical Gardens. Golf course designed by George Hansen in 1932. Largest park in the system, named after city planner Charles B. Whitnall who was instrumental in starting up the park system.	
Wilson	1601 W Howard Ave	76.7-acre (310,000 m^{2})	Named in honor of Woodrow Wilson. Initial acquisition of the site occurred in 1930. In 1938, work on the park's grade was completed by the Works Progress Administration.	
Wilson Recreation	4001 S 20 St	51.5-acre (208,000 m^{2})	Located directly west of Wilson Park. Programming is done year around at the indoor ice arena for both open free style skating as well as private groups and clubs. The Milwaukee Admirals continue to use Wilson as a practice facility.	
Wisconsin Avenue	10300 W Wisconsin Ave	17.9-acre (72,000 m^{2})		
Wyrick	5400 W Green Tree Rd	17.7-acre (72,000 m^{2})		
Zablocki	3717 W Howard Ave	45.0-acre (182,000 m^{2})		
Zeidler Union Square	301 W Michigan St	1.2-acre (4,900 m^{2})	First Milwaukee public park in 1835, as Union Square. Acquired by the county in 1937, as Fourth Ward Square. Now named after Milwaukee's 33rd mayor Carl Zeidler.	
Park	Address	Size	Notes	Photo

== Other parks ==
Park	Address	Size	Notes	Photo
Alice Bertschy Kadish	909 E. North Ave.	24-acre (97,000 m^{2})	Home to the Selig-Joseph-Folz Amphitheater	
Carmen Playfield	7320 W. Carmen St			
Clovernook Playfield	6594 W. Langos			
Custer Playfield	4001 W. Custer Ave			
Enderis Playfield	76th street to 67th street Center to Burleigh/Lisbon	326.0-acre (1,319,000 m^{2})	Dorothy Enderis was a public recreation pioneer. In her time, this Lady of the Lighted Schoolhouse could look at a sandbox and see the possibility of a playground within walking distance of every child; could meet each playground attendant and see the possibility of training a future community leader; and could view the ravages of the Great Depression and see the city's recreation playfields as social centers that would knit our community together. Enderis Playfield is Home of the Magic Grove sculpture.	
Erie Street Plaza	E. Erie St	0.25-acre (1,000 m^{2})	Located in the Historic Third Ward neighborhood and opened in 2010. Situated at confluence of Milwaukee River and Kinnickinnic River near harbor entrance, with view of Hoan Bridge and Milwaukee Pierhead Light.	
Garden Park	E Locust St & N Bremen St	0.3-acre (1,200 m^{2})	Located in Milwaukee's Riverwest neighborhood. The site of neighborhood gatherings and Sunday concerts. Features native prairie plantings maintained by neighborhood residents. Named in part after nearby Gordon Park, four blocks east.	
Henry Maier Festival Park	200 N. Harbor Drive	75-acre (300,000 m^{2})	Location of Marcus Amphitheater and Summerfest, among a variety of ethnic festivals	
Kaszube's Park	S Carferry Dr at Jones Island	0.15-acre (610 m^{2})	City-owned park. The last trace of a Milwaukee fishing village that had been settled by Kaszubs on Jones Island. Smallest park in Milwaukee.	
Kilbourn Reservoir	750 E North Ave	35-acre (140,000 m^{2})	The park was created with the removal of a 135-year-old underground drinking water reservoir that once held 20 million gallons of water. The land was donated in the 1870s to the City of Milwaukee by Mayor Byron Kilbourn.	
Lakeshore State Park	N Harbor Dr & E Polk St	22-acre (89,000 m^{2})	Green space east of Milwaukee's downtown, opened in 1998 and managed by the Wisconsin Department of Natural Resources. It is open to the public from 6 a.m. to 10 p.m.	
Snail's Crossing	3000 N Bremen Street	0.5-acre (2,000 m^{2})	Green space with a playground in Milwaukee's Riverwest neighborhood alongside a former railroad right of way. It is located 1 block west of Garden Park and across Burleigh Street from the start of Milwaukee's Beerline Trail. It was known as "Baby Park" to Riverwest residents until 1990.	
Three Bridges Park	South bank of the Menomonee River, from approximately S. 35th St. to just east of S. 27th St.	24-acre (97,000 m^{2})	Opened in 2013 on brownfield and former rail yard site in Menomonee Valley. Land is owned by Milwaukee Development Authority, while park is administered jointly by Wisconsin Department of Natural Resources and nonprofit Urban Ecology Center.	
Urban Park	43°02'10.3"N 87°53'52.6"W	2.9-acre (12,000 m^{2})	The green space was created in 2022. The land is owned by the Port of Milwaukee.	
Victory Over Violence Park	2601 N N Doctor M.L.K. Jr Dr		Opened in 2000 to serve as a community gathering and healing space for victims of violence and trauma.	
Wisconsin State Fair Park	640 S 84th St	190-acre (770,000 m^{2})	Located in West Allis, hosts the Wisconsin State Fair since 1892.	
Zillman Park	S Kinnickinnic Ave & E Ward St	0.7-acre (2,800 m^{2})	Located in the Bayview neighborhood, and managed by the City of Milwaukee, Department of Public Works. Wisconsin State Historical Marker #373, erected at the park in 1998, honors Bayview's historic immigrant worker population.	
Park	Address	Size	Notes	Photo

== See also ==
- Milwaukee
- Neighborhoods of Milwaukee
- Oak Leaf Trail
- List of baseball parks in Milwaukee
