= Charles B. Whitnall =

American urban park planner

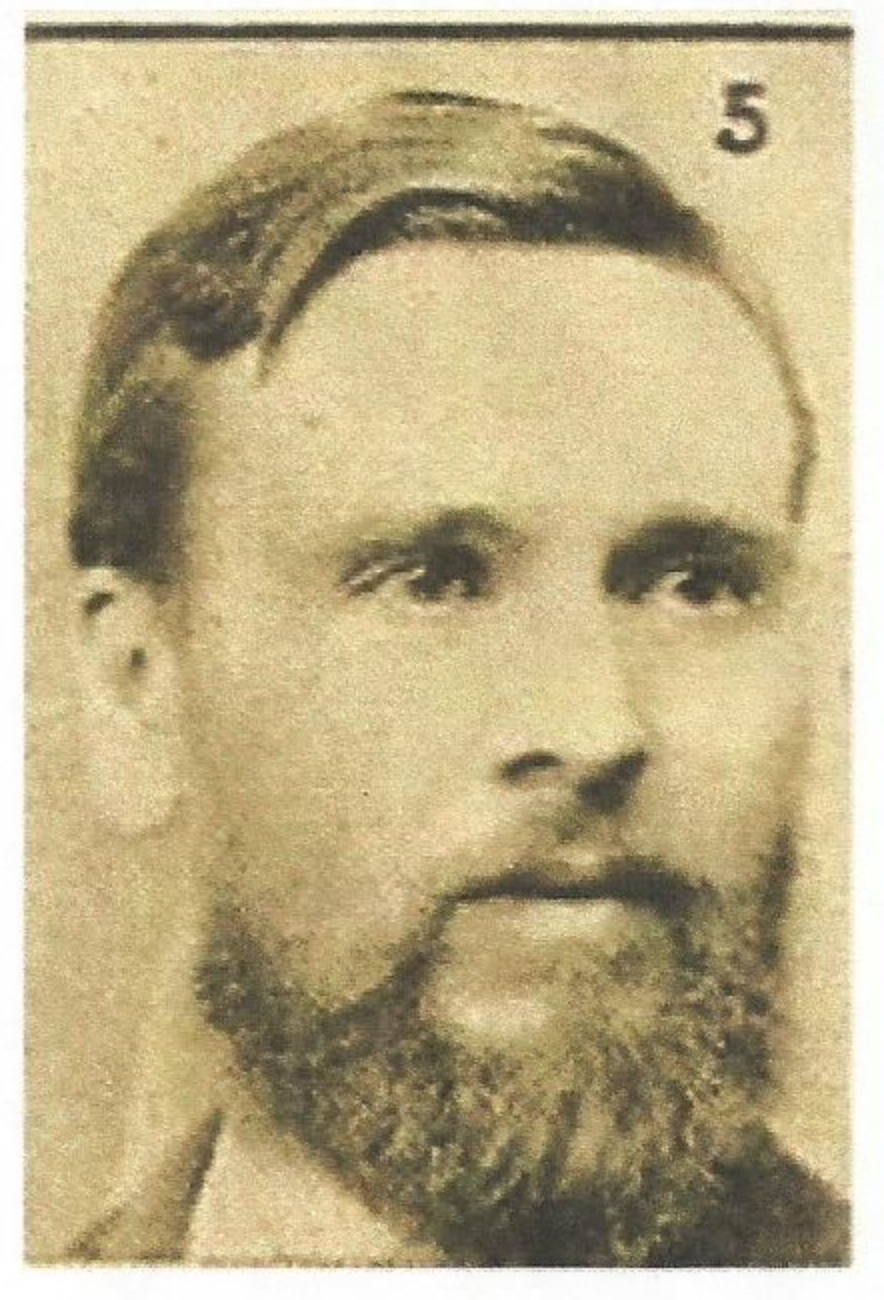
Charles B. Whitnall, Milwaukee florist, businessman and Socialist officeholder

Charles Byrner Whitnall (January 21, 1859 – 1949) was a florist and banker who became the first Socialist city treasurer of the city of Milwaukee and the architect of Milwaukee County, Wisconsin's system of public parks. He served as Secretary of the Milwaukee County Park Commission from its inception in 1907 until his retirement in 1941.

Whitnall was a critic of urban congestion and suburban sprawl. As de facto planner for the city of Milwaukee he sought to alleviate the negative effects of congestion and to prevent sprawling development from destroying the natural landscape. His plan of 1923 began the purchase and development of 84 miles of greenways along the course of streams and rivers, in order to preserve these waterways in a natural state and to provide city dwellers convenient access to the natural environment. Whitnall was critical of the prevailing urban park ideal of his day, which he described as, "an artificial attempt to create a natural influence." His parkway plan has been described as "decades ahead of its time."

== Background ==
Charles B. Whitnall was born in Milwaukee on January 21, 1859, the son of a florist. He went into and eventually took over his father's business, and became active in the floral industry. He helped organize a National Association of Florists and started the Florist Telegraph Delivery System (FTD) as a retailers' cooperative.

Whitnall was a charter member of the Socialist Party of America and also a co-founder of the Commonwealth Mutual Savings Bank of Milwaukee, a cooperative enterprise.

Whitnall Park was named for Charles B. Whitnall Park. The planning for the park began in 1924.
