= Jacob Rutstein =

American businessman (1877–1946)

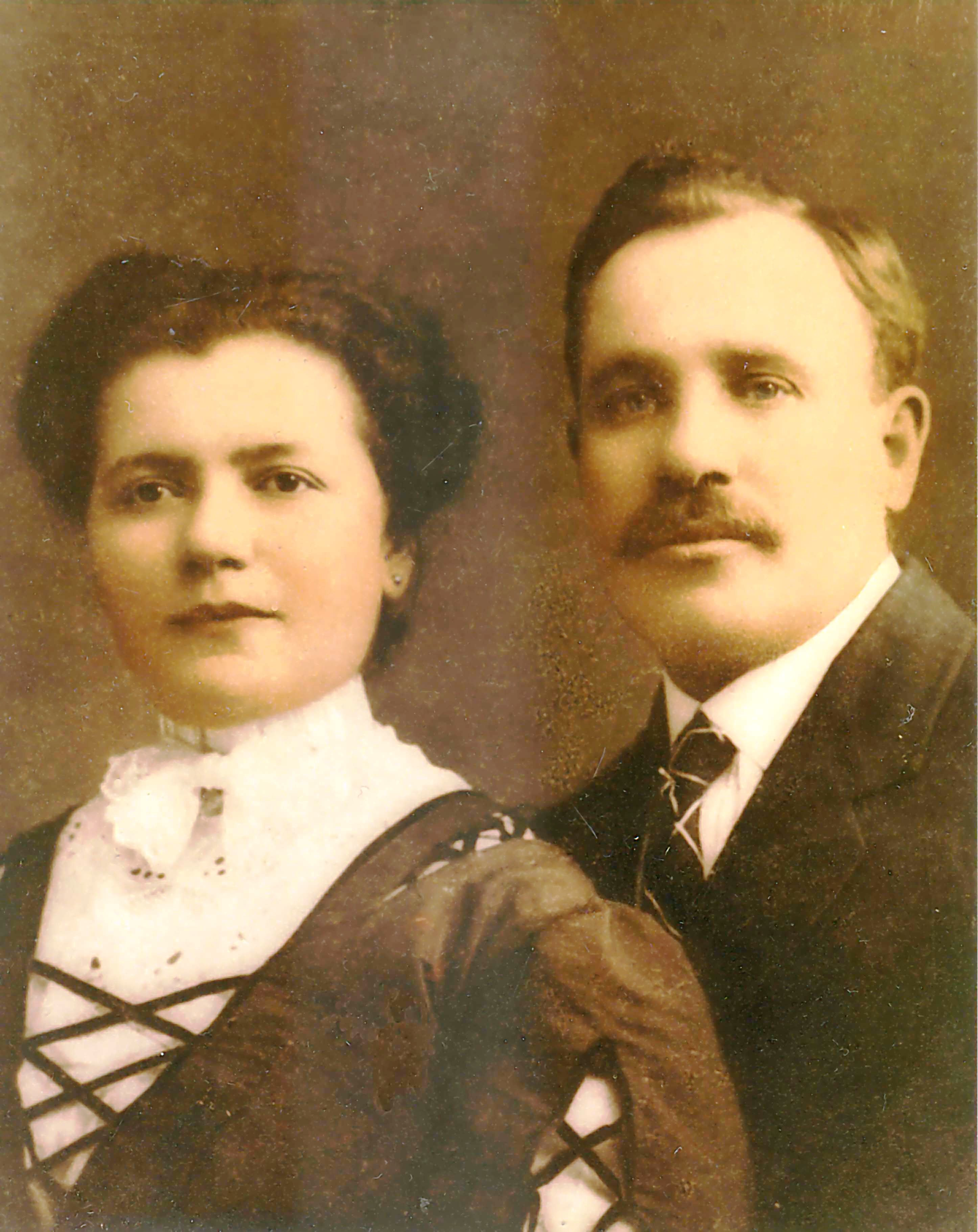
- Born: Jacob Rutstein; April 15, 1877; Tolochin, Belarus
- Died: February 27, 1946 (aged 68); Brooklyn, New York
- Occupations: Real estate developer businessman lumberman
- Known for: Jew Plank
- Spouse: Bessie Poretzky

Jacob Rutstein (1877–1946) was an American businessman, philanthropist, real estate developer and lumber magnate who became known for his innovations to the Lumber Nominal Measurements or Nominal Size by the invention of the 11/4 wooden panel.

== Early life ==
Jacob Rutstein was born in Tolochin, Belarus as Yankev Rutstein. From an early age, Jacob's father took him to the Tolochin commodities market which dealt primarily in lumber. Jacob developed a keen business acumen, and by the age of twelve, he far exceeded his own father's business prowess. During his teenage years, Rutstein was drafted into the Russian army after which he was recruited by a German company supervising the import of lumber into Western Europe. At eighteen, Rutstein was promoted to the General Manager of the Minsk Capital Region. Over time, Rutstein amassed a small fortune which he subsequently deposited in London. In 1902, at the age of approximately twenty-five, Rutstein, fleeing religious persecution, immigrated to the United States via London.

== Development of Brownsville, Brooklyn ==
The increased demand for lumber led Rutstein to acquire the raw source of timber. During the 1920s, Rutstein began to acquire lumber fields throughout the United States. By owning the source of timber, Rutstein was able to sell cheap lumber at reduced rates and undercut his competition throughout New York City. In control of the lumber supply, Rutstein was able to undertake large building campaigns throughout Brooklyn and especially in Brownsville and Crown Heights. The New York Times described Rutstein as "a pioneer builder in the Brownsville-East New York section of Brooklyn."

== Prudential Lumber Corporation & The Nominal Measurement Revolution ==
In 1930, in the midst of the Great Depression, Rutstein formed the Prudential Lumber Corporation. Despite the collapse of the global economy as a result of the depression, demand for cheaper lumber increased not only in New York but nationally. Since 1918, Rutstein had been experimenting with cutting lumber logs along new nominal lumber measurements. Rutstein innovated an 11/4" (2 3/4") wooden plank whereby the price of lumber was reduced 1/12 or about eight percent. At the time, most floor beams were 3/10 x 8/4 and when dressed on four sides by going through a planer, the 8" or 10" wood would end up being 7 5/8" or 9 5/8" in width.

Rutstein was able to convince mills on the West Coast to adopt the standard and it was colloquially called the "Jew Plank". According to Jim Denison in his history of the lumber industry, Rutstein "wanted this low-grade lumber to use for shoring for five stories of basement for parking lots, and a lot of those skyscrapers. So [people in the industry] called this Jew Plank that they cut, and it was a three-inch thickness, a rough cut, and put on ships. There were Calmar Lines that came into Newport, from the Suez Canal route, getting out to the West Coast. They brought steel out from the East Coast and delivered steel, and took lumber back to the East Coast again." This innovation would change the lumber industry and permanently adjust the structure of lumber nominal measurements into modern times.

== Beth-El Hospital ==
On February 23, 1933, the Brooklyn Daily Eagle announced that Jacob Rutstein was named for a committee at Beth-El Hospital, formally known as Brownsville and East New York Hospital. On November 12, 1933, an article appeared which contained a picture of Jacob Rutstein, the caption providing: "Jacob Rutstein, prominent charitable worker and treasurer of the Beth-El Hospital, is active in obtaining subscriptions reservations for the hospital's 10th annual dinner to be held at the Waldorf Astoria held on Sunday evening. December 3. This annual dinner attracts an attendance of 1,200 and the proceeds go to the annual deficit." Similar articles appeared on November 23, 1933, and December 13, 1934. On December 15, 1934, another article described the opening of the Beth-El Hospital bazaar, and stated that Jacob Rutstein was chairman of the bazaar committee and had helped procure $50,000 worth of merchandise, which would go towards the deficit of the hospital. A similar article regarding Beth-El appeared on November 1, 1937. Another article about an upcoming Beth-El hospital dinner was published on May 5, 1940, citing Jacob Rutstein and stating that Samuel Strausberg, acting president of the hospital, praised Rutstein for his "untiring efforts in helping to make the dinner a huge success." Strausberg added that from "early morning until late at night, Mr. Rutstein and his committee are giving up their own businesses in an effort to obtain subscriptions for the dinner."

== The Redstone Group ==
Rutstein had numerous children, grandchildren and great-grandchildren, many of whom continued in the real estate industry. Over four generations, the family included restaurateurs, developers, real estate attorneys and financiers. The multi-generational level of experience of the Rutstein family in the real estate sector ultimately evolved into The Redstone Group, a closely held family company in the real estate industry.

== Notable Descendants ==
Some notable descendants of Jacob Rutstein include:

- Helaine Blumenfeld, artist
- Remy Blumenfeld, British TV producer
- Jared Blumenfeld, former United States EPA regional administrator for the Pacific Southwest
- Isaiah Rothstein, American rabbi and activist
