= The Great Double =

Bronze sculpture by Alicia Penalba

- Artist: Alicia Penalba
- Year: 1972
- Type: Public art, sculpture
- Dimensions: 840 cm × 440 cm × 405 cm (330 in × 170 in × 159 in)
- Location: Milwaukee, Wisconsin

The Great Double is a bronze sculpture by the Argentine artist Alicia Penalba (1913–1982). One statue named Le Grand Double (1962–1964) is on display in the sculpture garden of the Dutch Kröller-Müller Museum. Another (1972) is on display outside the MGIC building in Milwaukee, Wisconsin (43°02′33.5″N 87°54′32.1″W).

== Description ==
The Great Double measures 28 feet high and weighs 12 tons. The sculpture was produced by the Tesconi & C. Fonderia D'Arte S.N.C located in Pietrasanta, Italy.

The Great Double resembles an organic form. It is made up of many different round and rectangular forms, and has a surface that somewhat resembles bark. The one on display in Milwaukee stands between the MGIC building and a small park, as if to be a stepping stone; it merges the organic and the man-made. The Great Double is truly a monumental sculpture. Standing vertically at 840 cm (over two stories) it challenges the surrounding trees within its proximity for dominance, as well as the MGIC building, to which it is adjacent. One must stand several feet away in order to take the whole object in at once.

== Historic information ==
"The Mortgage Guaranty Insurance Corporation was founded in the 1950s by Max Karl... Less than twenty-five years later, the company had become a financial leader and decided to build its corporate headquarters in Milwaukee." Skidmore, Owings and Merril hired Milwaukee firm Fitzhugh Scott Architects, Inc. to design the headquarters, which were located east of the Marcus Center. The design consisted of an inverted pyramid, with each floor fifteen feet below the ground.

When The Great Double was selected to be sited on the plaza in front of the building, the plaza, the stairs and the landscape were redesigned to give visitors a feeling of monumentality. "Max Karl, president of the MGCI Investment Corporation, commissioned the sculpture with the desire to place a major artist's work in the community and to reassert the commitment of the private sector to the improvement of downtown Milwaukee. At the dedication of the sculpture, Mayor Henry Maier congratulated MGIC for its "distinctive contribution to the cityscape" in an area targeted for urban renewal in the city."
