= My Diary =

My Diary may refer to:

== Books ==
- My Diary, by Edith Holden, alternative title for The Country Diary of an Edwardian Lady
- My Diary, by Marvel Comics 1950s in comics
- Jenny, My Diary, by "Jenny", pseudonymous post-nuclear war fiction by Yorick Blumenfeld 1983
- My Diary..., various volumes by Sir William Howard Russell
- Fragments from my Diary, by Maksim Gorky 1940

== Music ==
- My Diary, album by Indonesian band Mocca 2002
- My Diary (R. Kelly album), 2005 compilation album
- "My Diary", single by Carol Connors 1961
- "My Diary", single by Rosa Lee Parks from Jimi Hendrix discography 1965
- "My Diary", song by Jim Jones from Harlem: Diary of a Summer 2005
