= Alicia Penalba =

Argentine artist, sculptor (1913–1982)

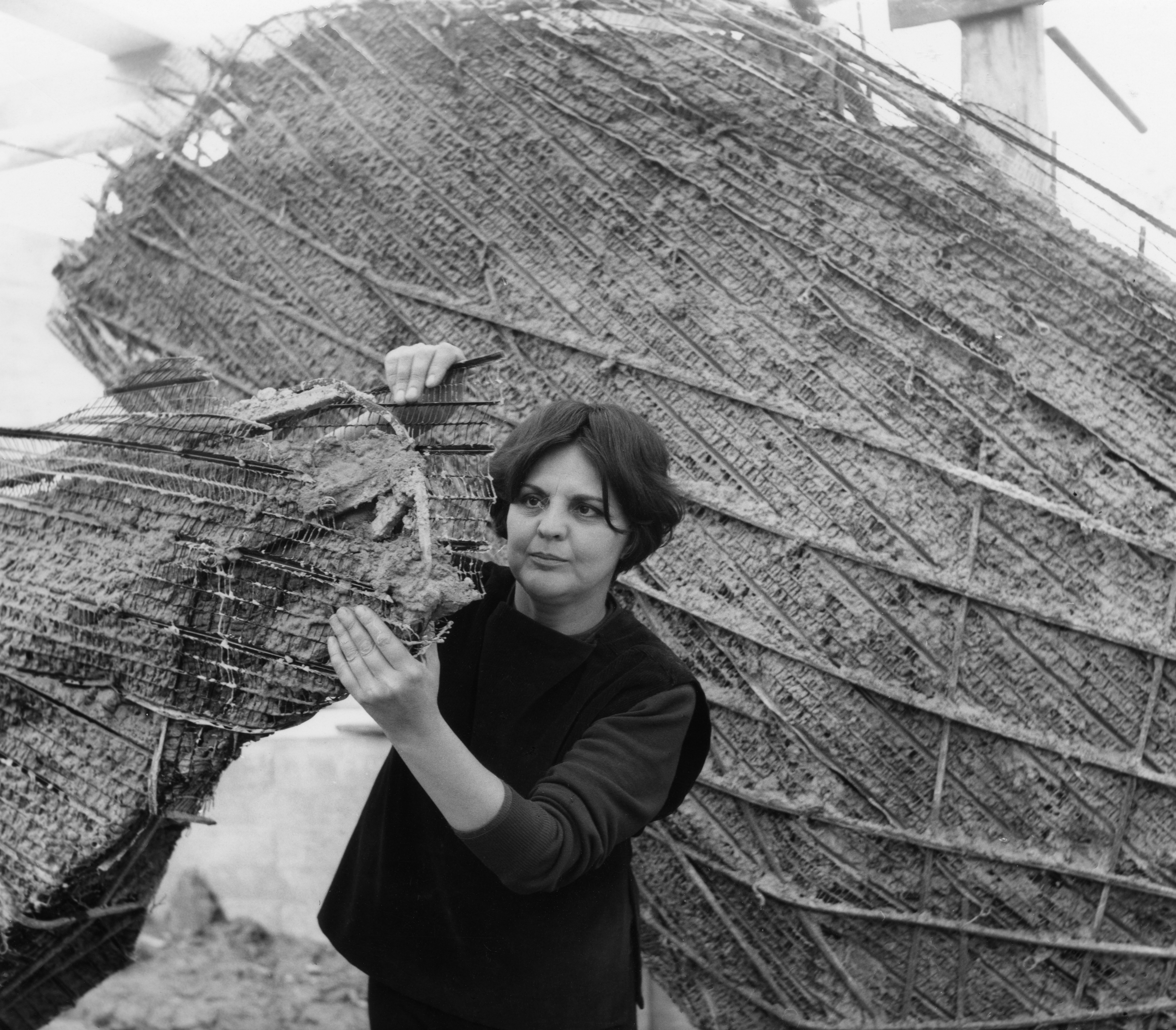
- Penalba in 1963
- Born: August 9, 1913; San Pedro, Argentina
- Died: November 4, 1982 (aged 69); Dax, Landes, France
- Known for: Sculpture, tapestry, weaver
- Movement: abstract art
- Website: penalba.com

Alicia Penalba (August 9, 1913 – November 4, 1982) was an Argentine sculptor, tapestry designer, and weaver.

== Biography ==
Penalba was born in San Pedro, Buenos Aires Province on 9 August 1913. She originally sought a career in drawing and painting. However, in 1950, during her stay in Paris, she decided to commit entirely to sculpture. Penalba specialized in vertical organic forms and drew inspiration from fellow sculptors Etienne Martin and Etienne Hajdu. Her works are part of the non-figurative abstract art movement and tie in with the work of Martin, Hajdu, François Stahly, Karl-Jean Longuet, Simone Boisecq and Marta Colvin who staged a renewal of the sculptural form from 1950. By the 1960s, her artwork shifted slightly toward sculptures of a more horizontal orientation. While she created many sculptures of all shapes and sizes, she is best known for her monumental pieces that can be found all over the world. Her statue, The Great Double (Le Grand Double; 1962–1964) is included in the sculpture garden of the Kröller-Müller Museum in Otterlo, Netherlands, while her 1972 version is displayed outside the MGIC building in Milwaukee, Wisconsin, US. In 1974, while working in Pietrasanta, Panalba, encouraged Helaine Blumenfeld to try sculpting in marble and introduced her to master carver Sem Ghelardini.

Penalba died in Dax, Landes on November 4, 1982.

== Work ==
Penalba was awarded the International Sculpture Prize at the 5th Biennial in São Paulo, Brazil (1961). Her work in the collections of the Art Institute of Chicago, the Buffalo AKG Art Museum, the Kröller-Müller Museum, the Middelheim Open Air Sculpture Museum, and the Museo Nacional de Bellas Artes (Buenos Aires). Penalba's work was included in the 2021 exhibition Women in Abstraction at the Centre Pompidou.
