= Sem Ghelardini =

Italian sculptor

- Born: Semme Ghelardini; 30 March 1927; Pietrasanta, Italy
- Died: 12 January 1997 (aged 69); Pietrasanta, Italy
- Occupation(s): sculptor and artisan

Sem Ghelardini (30 March 1927 – 12 January 1997) was an Italian sculptor and artisan. He was known as a master marble-carver and was the founder of Studio Sem in Pietrasanta, which has executed the monumental works of many contemporary sculptors, including Henry Moore and Joan Miró. Helaine Blumenfeld and Harold F. Clayton are amongst the artists who learned marble carving at his studio. Ghelardini died in Pietrasanta, the city of his birth, at the age of 69. Studio Sem continues to this day, directed by his former assistant and collaborator Keara McMartin and his youngest son Pierangelo Ghelardini.

== Life and career ==
Ghelardini was born in Pietrasanta, a town in the foothills of the Apuan Alps long known for its marble quarries and artisans working in marble. Michelangelo was sent there in 1518 by Pope Leo X to source the marble for the façade of the Basilica of San Lorenzo.

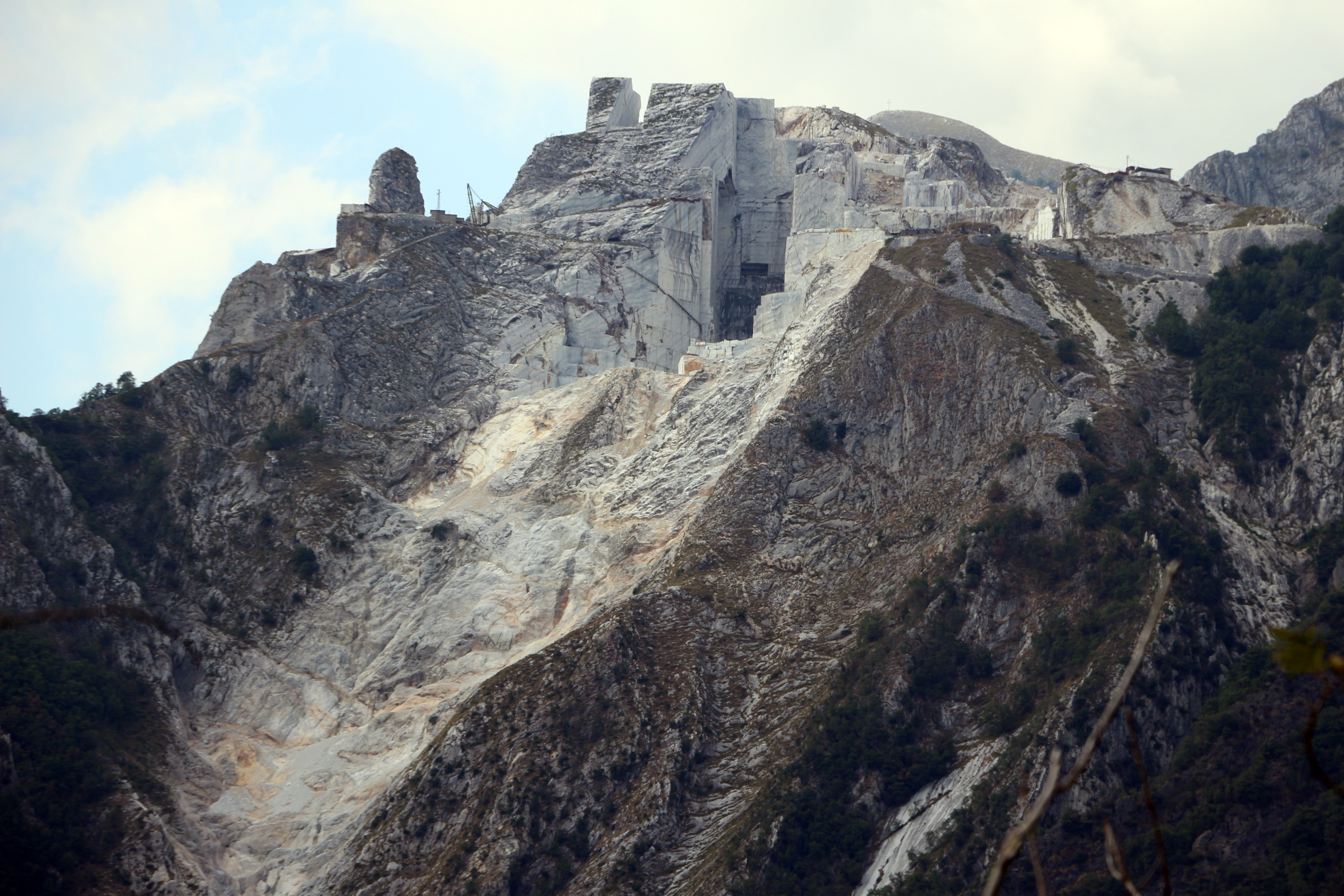
Marble quarry in the Apuan Alps above Pietrasanta

At the age of 15, Ghelardini became a prominent member of the Italian resistance movement in the region, working with the American forces, who would drop off money to fund their activity. After the war, he studied at art schools in Massa and Florence and then returned to Pietrasanta, where he trained as a marble sculptor with Dino Niccolai. When the firm they were working for went bankrupt in the early 1950s, Niccolai and Ghelardini opened their own studio specialising in the production of figurative statuary for churches and cemeteries. After Niccolai's retirement, Ghelardini carried on the firm which would later become known as Studio Sem. The business had thrived in the 1950s and early 1960s with clients from Italy and abroad. Amongst the works they executed during that time was a statue of the Madonna for Saint Patrick's Cathedral in New York and the restoration of a bust of Diana for the Versailles Museum.

In 1963, the Second Vatican Council advocated a retrenchment in religious art and removed the requirement that all Catholic churches have a marble statue of the church's namesake. The decision nearly brought the firm to bankruptcy and saw the closure of many marble-carving and bronze-casting businesses in Pietrasanta. However, Ghelardini was one of the first marble artisans in Italy to recognise the opportunities afforded by abstract sculpture and working with contemporary artists to help them realize the often monumental works which they had designed. It was to become the mainstay of Studio Sem. From the early 1960s, Henry Moore entrusted Ghelardini's studio with the execution of the majority of his stone sculptures. Other artists for whom the studio had executed work in the 1960s and 1970s included Henri-Georges Adam, Emile Gilioli, Joan Miró, and Alicia Penalba. Amongst the artists who later collaborated with the studio were Barry Flanagan and Knut Steen.

Ghelardini also took a keen interest in young sculptors, training them in stone carving and inviting them to meet with the major artists who were visiting the studio to supervise the execution of their works. Sculptors who trained with Ghelardini include Helaine Blumenfeld and Harold F. Clayton. In 2018, Blumenfeld described her first meeting with Ghelardini in 1974:

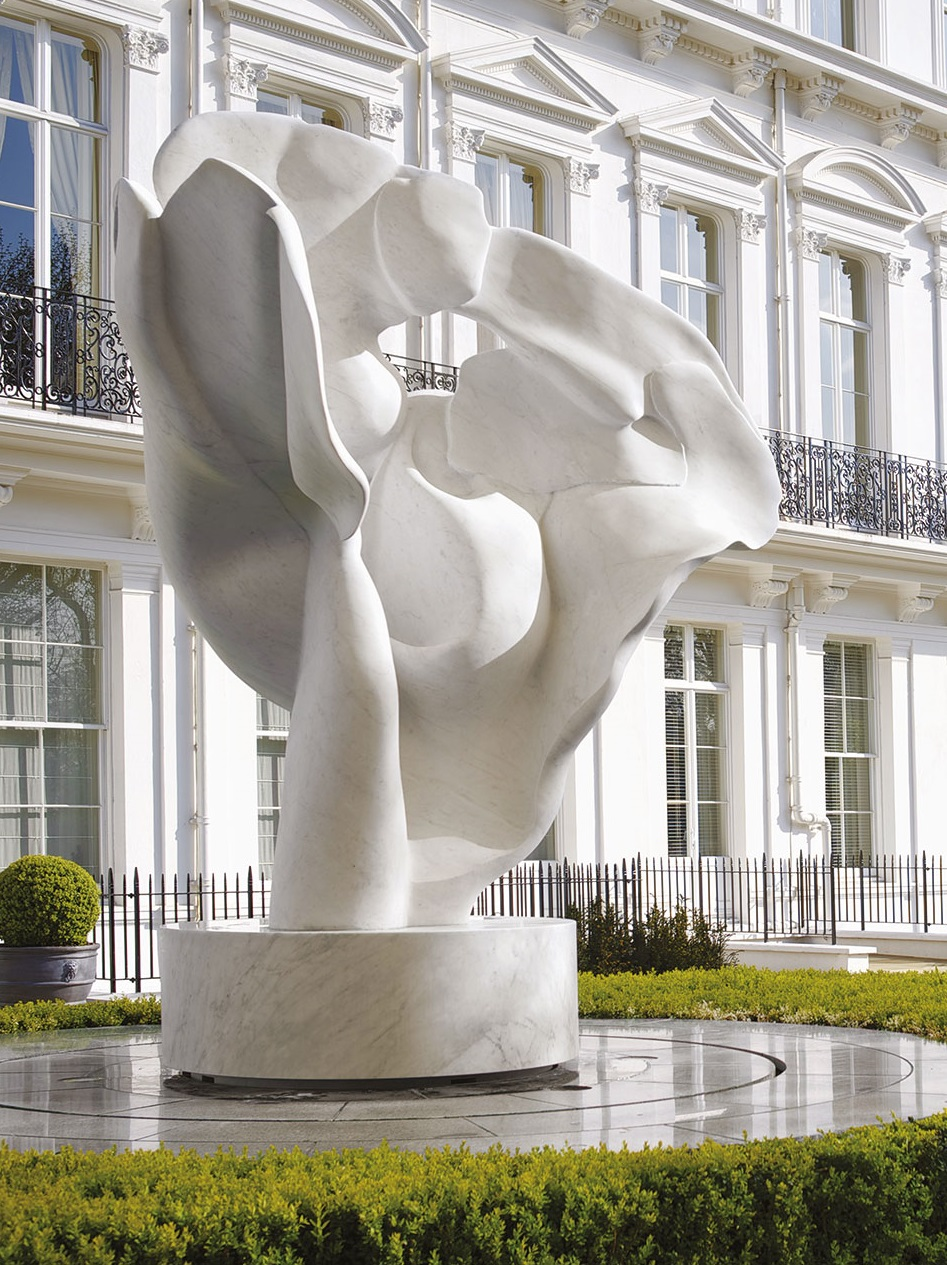
Blumenfeld's Tempesta, executed at Studio Sem and installed at The Lancasters, London in 2012

He was so charismatic. I immediately thought about Picasso because he had that same vitality.

Following a series of strokes which began in 1996 and became progressively worse, Sem Ghelardini died in Pietrasanta on 12 January 1997 at the age of 69. An exhibition by artists associated with his studio, entitled Omaggio a Sem: Se tutto va bene...siamo rovinati, (Note: In English: Homage to Sem: If everything goes well... we are ruined) took place in the town in the autumn of that year. In 2012, Piazza Sem Ghelardini in Pietrasanta was named in his honour.

In the later years of his life, Ghelardini had acquired Il Feudo, a small farm in the hills outside Montignoso, and designed the vineyard's unique terracing system made from off-cuts of granite. The vineyard and its winery continue to be run by members of the Ghelardini family.

== Studio Sem after Ghelardini ==
Since Gelardini's death, Studio Sem has been run jointly by his former assistant and collaborator Keara McMartin and his youngest son Pierangelo who is also a marble carver. The studio continues to specialise in the execution of works for contemporary sculptors including Helaine Blumenfeld, Damien Hirst and Peter Randall-Page but also produces classical and religious statuary.

The Fondazione Sem, founded in 2003 and administered by McMartin and Pierangelo Ghelardini, has provided three-month residencies at the studio for emerging sculptors since 2006. The residency program is financed by the Brian Mercer Charitable Trust and was set up by Helaine Blumenfeld and the Royal British Society of Sculptors. Masters and Emerging Sculptors from Studio Sem, a major exhibition of 36 artists who had worked at the studio from the 1960s to the early 2000s, was held in the University of Leicester's Harold Martin Botanic Garden from July to September 2007.

In 2016, the studio and its artists moved from the crowded historic center of Pietrasanta to more spacious premises in the nearby town of Camaiore.
