= Remy Blumenfeld =

British television producer

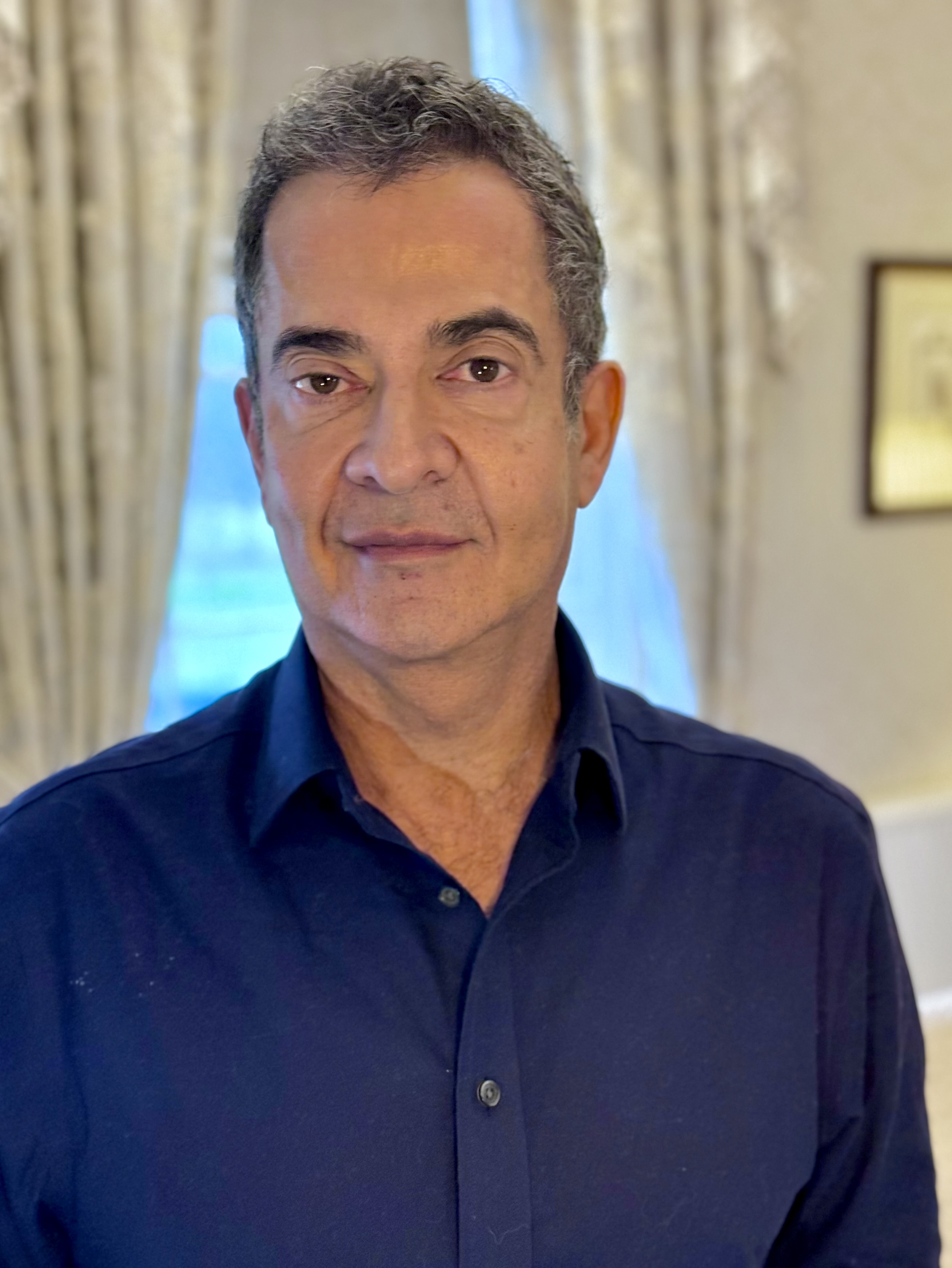
- Born: 1965 (age 60–61); Paris, France
- Occupations: Television producer Executive coach Leadership Development specialist.
- Relatives: Yorick Blumenfeld (father); Helaine Blumenfeld (mother); Erwin Blumenfeld (grandfather)

Remy Blumenfeld (born 1965) is a British television producer, format creator, executive coach and leadership development specialist who co-founded the production company Brighter Pictures which was acquired by Endemol in 2001.

According to a 2008 report in The Guardian, he had created and produced more than 30 original television series by that point in his career. Since 2018 he has worked as an executive coach and co-developed the Breakthrough Leaders leadership development program.

== Life and career ==
Blumenfeld was born in Paris to American parents. His father, Yorick Blumenfeld, was a writer; his mother, Helaine Blumenfeld, is a sculptor; and his grandfather was the fashion photographer Erwin Blumenfeld. He spent his early years in New York and Vienna before the family moved to the United Kingdom and settled in Cambridgeshire. He attended Bedales School and performed with the National Youth Theatre during the summers. After leaving school he worked for several years in the New York City area as a reporter for WPIX and WWOR-TV. He has stated that he knew he was gay from the age of eight.

=== Television career ===
In 1991 Blumenfeld co-founded the production company Brighter Pictures with Gavin Hay. The company specialised in factual entertainment, documentaries and reality-based programming and produced series for major UK broadcasters, including Channel 4’s Flava and Bombay Blush, BBC One’s Tabloid Tales with Piers Morgan and My Worst Week, and BBC Two’s Get a New Life. It developed formats including There’s Something About Miriam, Gay, Straight or Taken?, Wudja Cudja, and Undercover Lovers. In 1999, he produced the Channel 4 documentary The Other Francis Bacon.

Brighter Pictures was acquired by Endemol in 2001. Blumenfeld remained with the company for several years as creative director for the Brighter Pictures division.

Blumenfeld joined ITV Studios in September 2008 as director of formats. He led development and production of unscripted programming and new commercial strategy across ITV Studios’ international businesses following a downturn in advertising spending. He created a centralized development team that launched The Chase on ITV1 as part of a pilot scheme he initiated and expanded Four Weddings to 23 territories. He also drove international production and licensing of major formats, including I’m a Celebrity… Get Me Out of Here! (produced by ITV Studios subsidiaries in Sweden, Germany, and the USA) and Come Dine with Me (produced in the USA, Germany, Sweden, and 31 other territories). During his tenure, ITV Studios’ international production revenues grew 41% to £138 million.

Blumenfeld has also produced documentaries including the 2013 BBC Four film The Man Who Shot Beautiful Women about his grandfather Erwin Blumenfeld and Hard Beauty (2018) about his mother Helaine Blumenfeld.

=== Theatre ===
Blumenfeld produced Eunuchs In My Wardrobe, a one-man show written and performed by Silas Carson, with Scamp Theatre at Assembly George Square during the 2011 Edinburgh Fringe.

In 2016, he produced Tramp’s London production of Tennessee Williams’s Confessional at Southwark Playhouse, directed by Jack Silver. The production received reviews from WhatsOnStage, British Theatre Guide, Everything Theatre, and BritishTheatre.com.

Leadership development and executive coaching

Since 2018 Blumenfeld has worked as an executive coach and leadership development specialist, primarily through his practice Vitality Guru. He advises founders, executives, and creative professionals in media, entertainment, technology, and related sectors, focusing on leadership effectiveness, career development, resilience, and organizational culture. He has contributed articles on these topics to publications including Forbes (as a former contributor) and The Hollywood Reporter.

In 2025, Blumenfeld co-founded Coachr.ai, an artificial intelligence-powered leadership coaching platform intended to make executive coaching and professional development more accessible and scalable.

Breakthrough Leaders programme

In 2020 Blumenfeld co-developed the Breakthrough Leaders program with Simone Pennant of The TV Collective. The initiative provides leadership development, coaching, mentoring and networking support for mid-to-senior professionals from Black, Asian and Global Majority backgrounds working in the UK television and wider screen industries. It has run annual cohorts of approximately 50 participants and, by its fifth year in 2025, had supported more than 250 individuals. Partners and supporters have included Fremantle, BBC Studios, ITV Studios, Prime Video, Sky, and others. Blumenfeld has been credited in program materials and industry coverage as a co-developer or co-deviser, particularly in relation to the coaching framework and group coaching sessions.

The program has been noted in industry coverage for its focus on career progression into senior creative and executive roles.

== Recognition ==
Blumenfeld was ranked 19th in The Independent on Sunday’s Pink List in both 2005 and 2006. The annual list recognized the most influential gay men and women in the United Kingdom.

In October 2010, at the MIPCOM trade fair, Blumenfeld was named by industry peers as one of the world’s top five “Format Kings," an accolade covered by Broadcast magazine in its MIPCOM edition.

== Selected television credits ==
- Flava (Channel 4)
- Tabloid Tales with Piers Morgan (BBC One)
- My Worst Week (BBC One)
- Get a New Life (BBC Two)
- There’s Something About Miriam
- The Other Francis Bacon (Channel 4)
- The Man Who Shot Beautiful Women (BBC Four, 2013)
- Hard Beauty (2018; about Helaine Blumenfeld)
