= Church of Saint Anthony, Talachyn =

Church in Vitebsk Region, Belarus

Coordinates: 54°24′25″N 29°42′14″E

Church of Saint Anthony in Talachyn
- Касцёл Святога Антонія Падуанскага
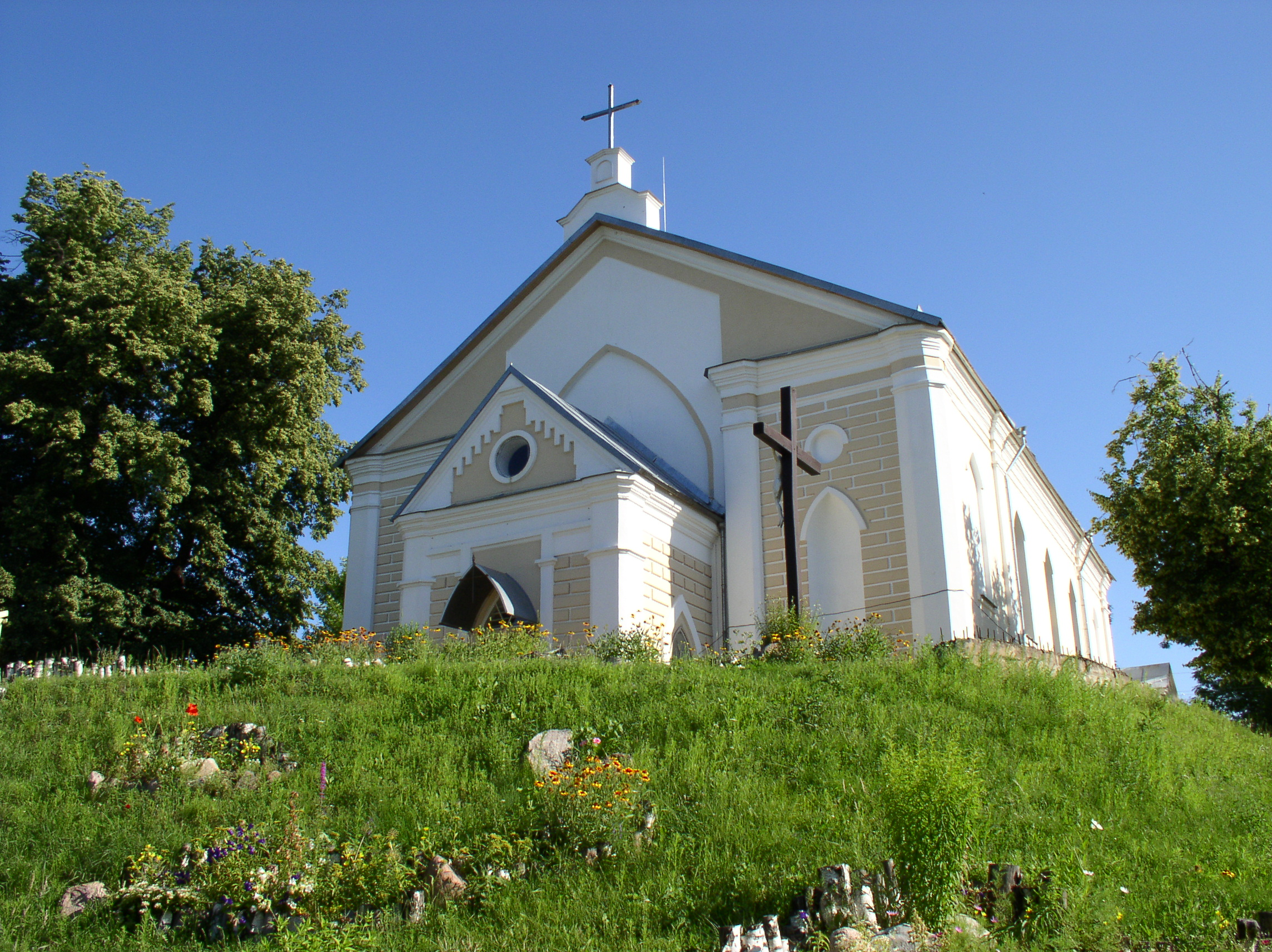
- Church of Saint Anthony in Talachyn
- Location: Talachyn (Talačyn)
- Country: Belarus
- Denomination: Roman Catholic church

Architecture
- Style: Baroque, Neoclassicism
- Years built: 1813—1861

Administration
- Diocese: Roman Catholic Diocese of Vitebsk

The Church of Saint Anthony in Talachyn is a Belarusian cultural heritage object, built in 1813–1861 and consecrated in the name of Saint Anthony of Padua.

The first Catholic parish in Talachyn was established in 1604 by Lew Sapieha. He built a school, a hospital, and a first church. The town was severely damaged in the Russo-Polish War (1654–1667) and the French invasion of Russia (1812), which is why no buildings of the 17th century and earlier have survived.

The current church of Saint Anthony was constructed between 1813 and 1861 in commemoration of the victory in the War of 1812. Some sources claim that the construction was finished by 1853.

In the 1930s the church was closed by the Soviet authorities and used as a warehouse, then a cafe and a club. In the 1960s the bell tower was destroyed.

In 1993 the church was returned to the parish and restored.

== Gallery ==
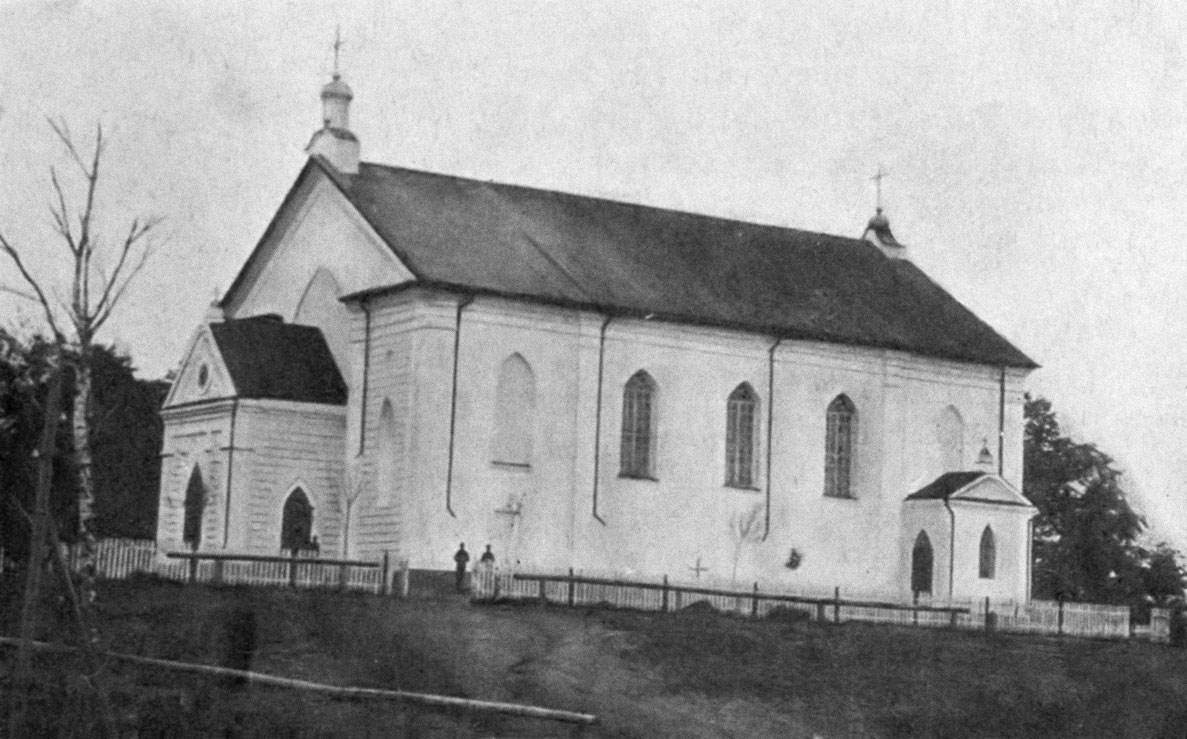
The church in 1913

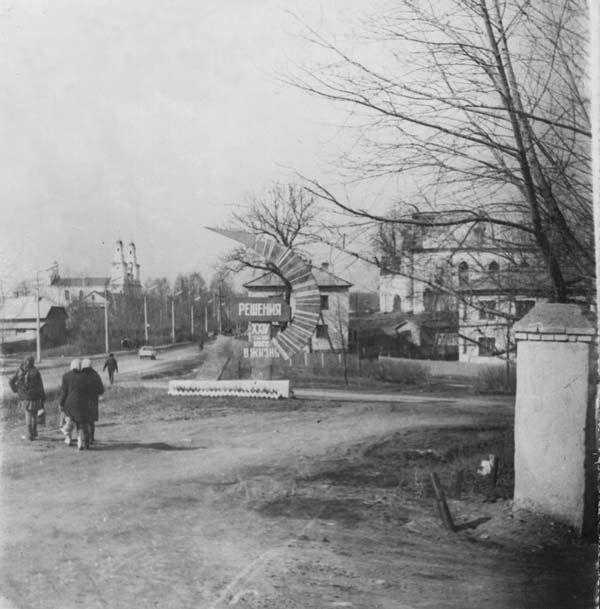
The church before 1950

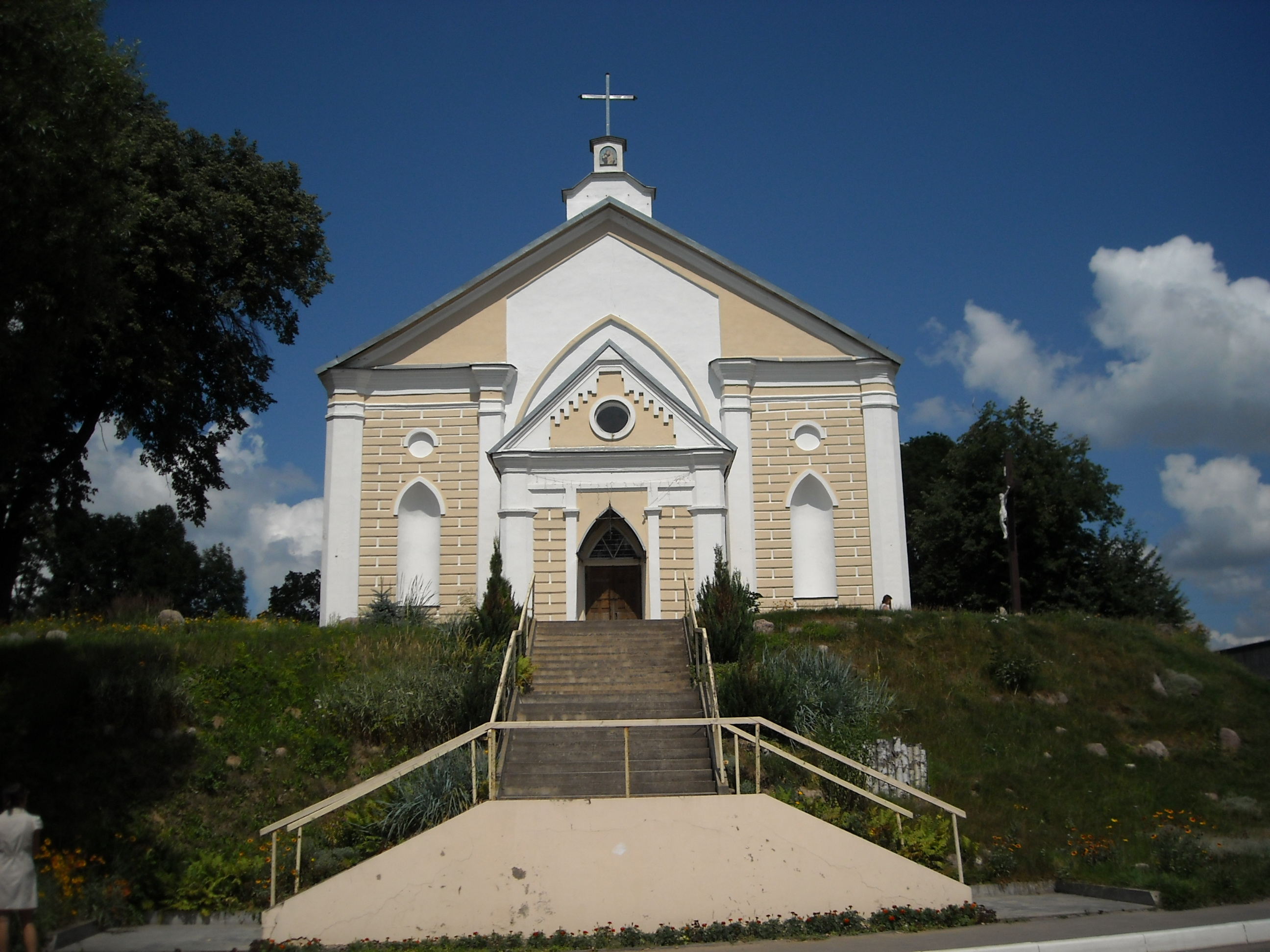
The church in 2010
