= Family (Blumenfeld) =

Sculpture by Helaine Blumenfeld

- Artist: Helaine Blumenfeld
- Year: 1983
- Type: Norwegian blue granite
- Dimensions: 150 cm × 69 cm (largest piece is approx. 89 in × 58 in × 27 in)
- Location: E. Wisconsin Ave. between N. 3rd St. and N. 4th St., Milwaukee; 43°2′20.393″N 87°54′53.228″W
- Owner: Administered by Federal Plaza Associates

Family is a public artwork by American artist Helaine Blumenfeld located on the Henry Reuss Federal Plaza, which is in downtown Milwaukee, Wisconsin, United States. The sculpture is made from Norwegian blue granite. It consists of five forms, with the largest form measuring approximately 89 x 58 x 27 inches. Family was installed in the Henry Reuss Federal Plaza in 1983.

== Description ==
The granite sculpture was commissioned to Helaine Blumenfeld for the plaza in front of the then in-construction Henry S. Russ Federal building. The artwork consists of five abstract biomorphic blue granite forms which sit in a circle. The sculptures are movable and the public is encouraged to climb, touch and rearrange the works periodically.

== Information ==
Family is located on the Henry Reuss Federal Plaza and tied to the building it sits in front of. The building was the brainchild of US House member Henry S. Reuss. He believed it would encourage the development of downtown Milwaukee, as well as group thirty federal agencies under one roof. When Reuss made the plans for the new building public, he announced that there would be no federal money given for artwork, explaining that an anonymous donor had offered to donate an outdoor sculpture. Blumenfeld was thus privately commissioned to create Family in the late 1970s. She selected 68 tons of Norwegian blue granite, which she had shipped to Carrara, Italy. Blumenfeld and four assistants proceeded to chisel the five forms. "Family is the first of several of Blumenfeld's multi-component outdoor sculptures. Although her works are abstract, the forms are organic and are intended to symbolize human figures and their relationships. Like members of a family, each of the humanoid figures relates strongly to the others, but retains its separate identity." As the viewer moves the parts, the sculpture changes; the same way that relationships are always changing. Blumenfeld refers to this evolving relationship stating, "One is sometimes stronger, one is weaker. Looking at a family you see the different values placed on each member at different times. I'm trying to show the dynamic tension in a relationship."

=== Acquisition ===
The work cost around $250,000 and was funded by two anonymous donors.

== Artist ==
Helaine Blumenfeld was born in New York in 1942. She obtained a PhD in philosophy from Columbia University before moving to Paris to work as an assistant in the Cubist sculptor's Ossip Zadkine's studio. She decided to begin sculpting after having interesting vivid dreams and realizing that words were not enough to express what she experienced. Her early works concentrated in transforming a figurative form into a symbolic meaning. Later she began exploring the relationship between more than one form. Blumenfeld believes that sculpture is not about narrative, but is instead centered on experience and process, having the potential to excite the viewer's imagination. She develops her ideas in clay to get a sense of the figure's form before translating them to their final materials. "Blumenfeld's daily practice remains grounded in the working of raw materials, a physical relationship that provides a channel for her imagination. She thrives in the solitary confines of her studio where she can think, dream, experiment and take risks without constraint." The artist relocated to Cambridge, England in 1976. She currently splits her time between Cambridge and her workshop in Pietrasanta, Italy.

== See also ==
- Helaine Blumenfeld category in Commons
