= Harold F. Clayton =

American sculptor

- Born: Harold Fooshee Clayton; May 9, 1954
- Died: May 26, 2015 (aged 61); Dallas, Texas
- Education: Italy
- Known for: sculpture, stone carving
- Notable work: marble cows

Harold Fooshee Clayton (May 9, 1954 – May 26, 2015) was a noted sculptor and stone-carver, best known for several sets of life-size sculptures of cows on display at various public sites in Texas.

Initially interested in painting, Clayton studied art at the Massachusetts College of Art in Boston, Massachusetts and the University of North Texas in Denton, Texas, graduating cum laude with a BFA in 1977. He moved to stone as a medium, and spent the years from 1982 to 1987 in Pietrasanta, Italy, studying carving in the studio of Sem Ghelardini.

While still in Italy, Clayton accepted a commission for four sets of five marble cows from for the Trammell Crow Company, a large Dallas real estate development concern. Three of the sets now stand in Texas at the Arboretum at Great Hills in Austin, at Founder's Park in Las Colinas in Irving, and at Trammel Crow Park in Dallas. The fourth set is at One Park Plaza in Milwaukee, Wisconsin. A sculpture of a half completed cow, emerging from stone, sits in the front yard of Clayton's former home in Dallas.

The cows at these sites stand where live cows actually grazed in the recent past. In fact, the models for the sculptures were made in 1980 from cows standing on the hill where the Las Colinas cows now appear to graze. Each cow required four tons of marble. The cows at the Arboretum site are much loved by children.

Clayton maintained a workshop in Dallas and was a member of the Stone Carvers Guild. He died of lung cancer in 2015.

== See also ==
- Concrete Cows
- CowParade

== Images ==
- Bison in Heath, Texas
- One of the Las Colinas cows
- The Milwaukee cows
