= Talachyn =

Town in Vitebsk Region, Belarus

Talachyn: Талачын (Belarusian); Толочин (Russian)
- Town
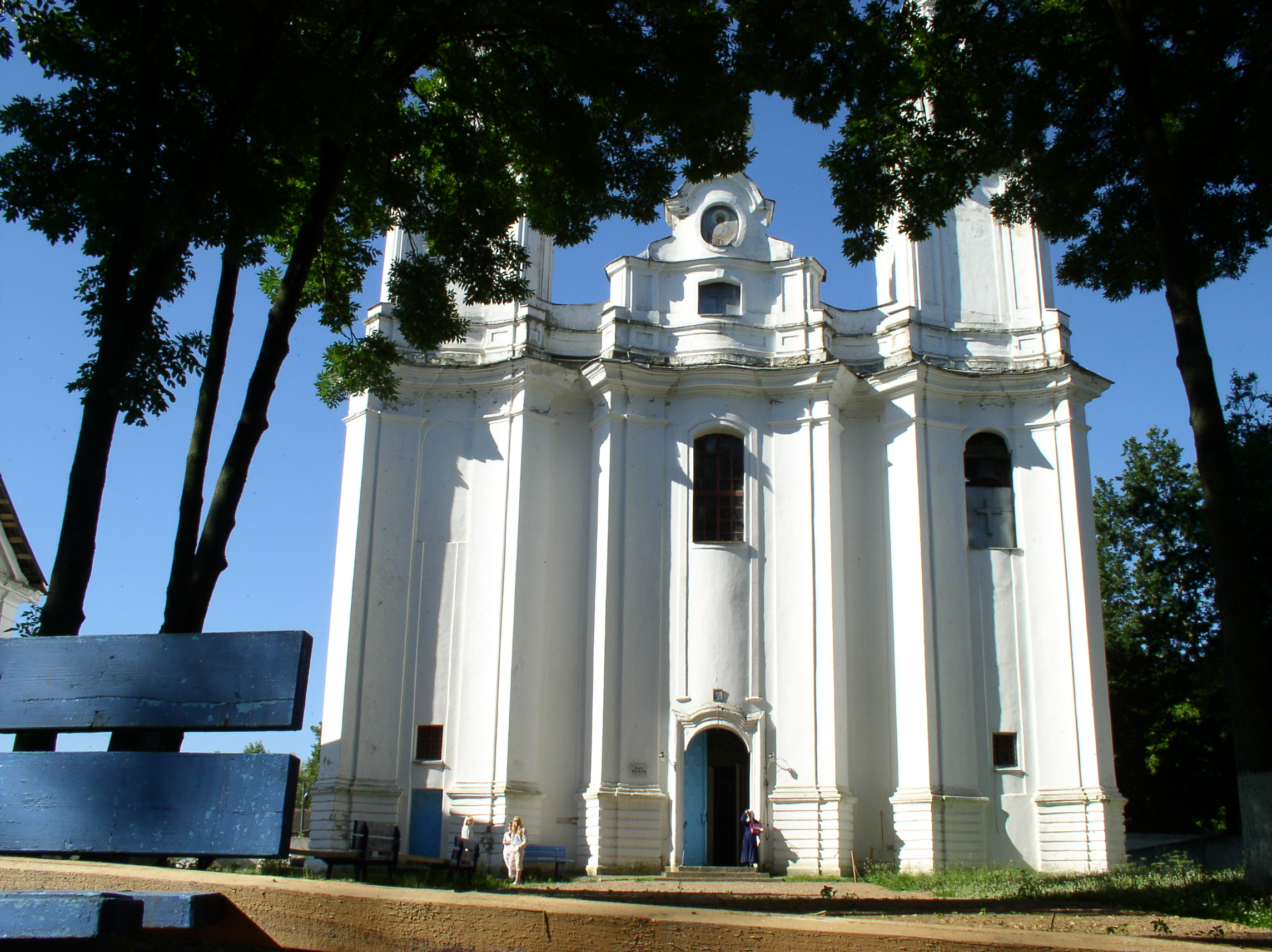
- Church of the Protection of Our Lady

- Flag Coat of arms

- Location within Belarus
- Coordinates: 54°25′N 29°42′E
- Country: Belarus
- Region: Vitebsk Region
- District: Talachyn District
- First mentioned: 1433
- Elevation: 199 m (653 ft)

Population (2025)
  - Total: 9,542
- Time zone: UTC+3 (MSK)
- Postal code: 211070
- Area code: +375 2136
- License plate: 2

Talachyn or Tolochin (Note: Belarusian: Талачын, romanized: Talačyn, IPA: [taɫaˈtʂɨn]; Russian: Толочин; Polish: Tołoczyn; Yiddish: טאָלאָטשין; Lithuanian: Talačynas.) is a town in Vitebsk Region, Belarus. It serves as the administrative center of Talachyn District. As of 2025, it has a population of 9,542.

== History ==
The town was first mentioned in 1433. Talachyn was a private town of the Sapieha, Szemiot and Sanguszko families, administratively located in the Vitebsk Voivodeship of the Polish–Lithuanian Commonwealth. In 1604 Lew Sapieha founded a Basilian monastery, church, hospital, and schools. It was repeatedly seized by Russians during the Polish–Russian War of 1654–1667. It was a shtetl.

In 1939, 1,292 Jews lived there, making up 21.2 percent of the total population of the town.

=== World War II ===
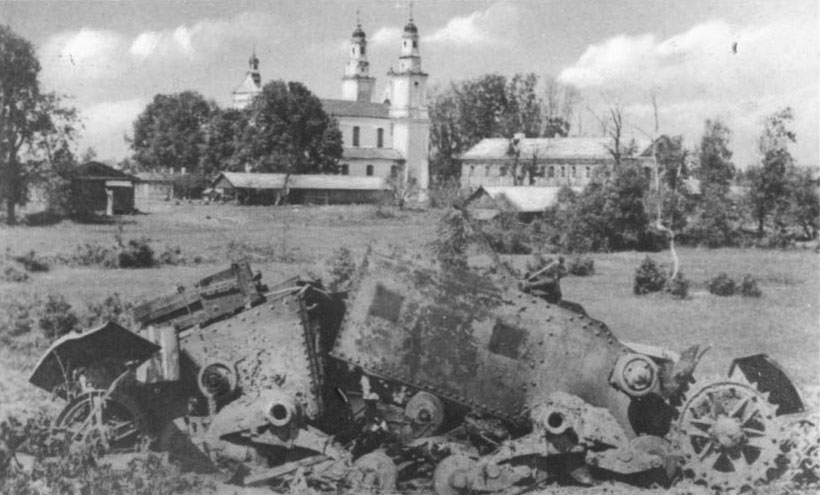
Talachyn in 1941

The town was under German military occupation from 6–7 July 1941 until 1944.

The Germans established a ghetto in September or October 1941, which consisted of 15 houses and had 2,000 inmates. The ghetto was liquidated on 12 or 13 March 1942 and its inmates were killed. The Germans killed more than 2,000 Jews, according to estimates made by the Soviet Extraordinary State Commission. However, this figure is disputed, due to the pre-war Jewish population being significantly lower, and some Jews having been drafted or able to flee. The Einsatzkommando reported that it had killed 1,551 Jews in March, presumably in the entire district.

A memorial has been erected to remember the fate of the victims.

== Notable structures ==
- Memorial to Jewish victims of World War II
- Church of St Anthony (Catholic)
- Church of the Holy Intercession (or: of the Protection of Our Lady)
- Pokrovsky Monastery
- Basilian Monastery, Talachyn
- Brothers' Cemetery (military cemetery)
- War Memorial

== Notable people ==
- Jacob Rutstein (1877–1946), businessman

== Sources ==
- Megargee, Geoffrey P.; Dean, Martin (2012). The United States Holocaust Memorial Museum Encyclopedia of Camps and Ghettos 1933–1945. Volume II. Indiana University Press, United States Holocaust Memorial Museum. pp. 1738–1739. ISBN 978-0-253-35599-7.
