= Talachyn district =

District of Vitebsk region, Belarus

Talachyn district Талачынскі раён (Belarusian)
- District
- Flag Coat of arms

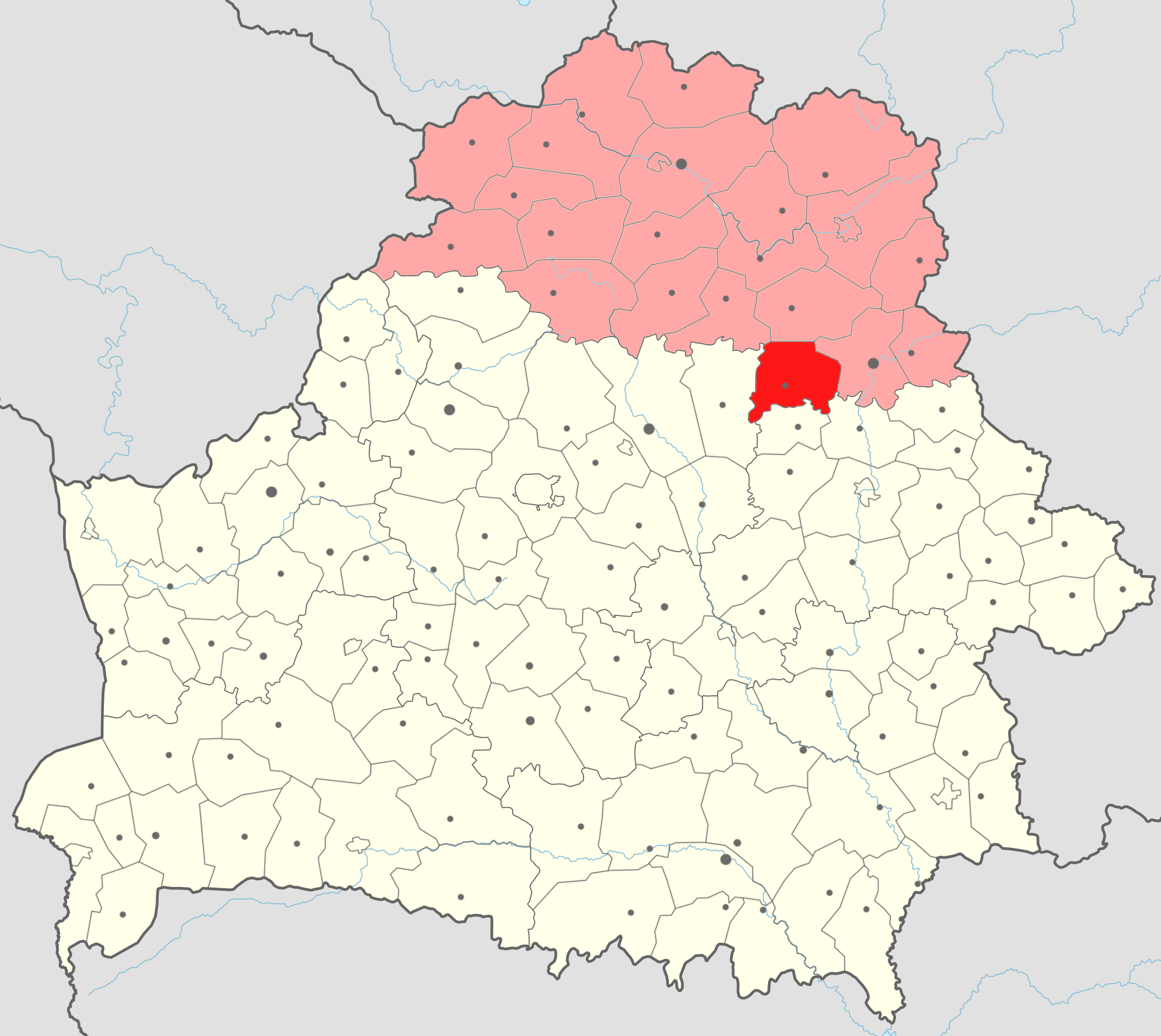
- Coordinates: 54°25′N 29°42′E
- Country: Belarus
- Region: Vitebsk region
- Administrative center: Talachyn

Area
  - Total: 1,498.56 km^{2} (578.60 sq mi)
- Elevation: 234 m (768 ft)

Population (2023)
  - Total: 22,218
  - Density: 14.826/km^{2} (38.400/sq mi)
- Time zone: UTC+3 (MSK)

Talachyn district (Belarusian: Талачынскі раён; Russian: Толочинский район) is a district (raion) of Vitebsk region in Belarus. Its administrative center is Talachyn.
