= Helaine Blumenfeld =

American sculptor (born 1942)

- Born: Helaine M. Colton; 1942; New York City
- Education: University of Michigan (BA, MA); Columbia University (PhD); Académie de la Grande Chaumière
- Occupation: Sculptor
- Relatives: Yorick Blumenfeld (husband); Remy Blumenfeld (son); Jared Blumenfeld (son)
- Awards: Honorary OBE
- Website: helaineblumenfeld.com

Helaine Blumenfeld (born 1942) is an American sculptor particularly known for her large-scale public sculptures. She creates works primarily in marble and bronze but also in granite and other materials. Examples of her work are in the collections of Clare College, Cambridge, the Courtauld Gallery and the Smithsonian. Amongst her large-scale public works are Family in granite installed in Henry Reuss Federal Plaza in Milwaukee, Wisconsin; Tempesta in marble at The Lancasters, London; and Fortuna in bronze at Canary Wharf, London. A fellow and past vice president of the Royal British Society of Sculptors, Blumenfeld was awarded an Honorary OBE in 2011. She lives in the United Kingdom and works there and in Pietrasanta, in Tuscany in central Italy.

== Life and career ==
Blumenfeld was born in New York City in 1942 and grew up in Jamaica Estates in the Borough of Queens. Her father was a builder. Her mother, a daughter of Russian émigrés, was a poet and painter. She received her BA and MA from the University of Michigan and then went on to study for her PhD in political philosophy at Columbia University. After completing her doctoral dissertation, John Locke: A Science of Ethics, in 1964, she studied art in Paris at the Académie de la Grande Chaumière under the sculptor Ossip Zadkine.. She held her first solo exhibition, a group of polished bronzes, in 1966 at the Palais Pálffy in Vienna.

Blumenfeld had met her husband Yorick in a New York bookshop while she was researching her PhD. They married when she was 20 and had two sons. Their elder son Remy, born in 1965, is a television producer. Their younger son Jared became an environmentalist and served as the EPA Administrator for California and the West under the Obama administration. The Blumenfelds moved permanently to Europe in the late 1960s, eventually settling in the Cambridgeshire village of Grantchester in 1970 where Helaine also has her UK studio.

A turning point in Blumenfeld's career came with her 1974 visit to Pietrasanta in Italy which eventually led her to add marble as one of her primary mediums. She had originally gone there to do bronze casting, but Alicia Penalba, another sculptor working in Pietrasanta, encouraged her to try sculpting in marble and introduced her to master carver Sem Ghelardini. Blumenfeld joined Ghelardini's Studio Sem and began learning stone-carving. At the time, she was the only woman working in the studio's marble yard. In the ensuing years she travelled back and forth from her Grantchester home to Pietrasanta to continue her work with Ghelardini. It was also in Pietrasanta during the 1970s that she met Henry Moore for the first time. He had come to the town to supervise two large-scale sculptures that Ghelardini was carving for him. In 1985 she had a joint exhibition with Moore entitled A British Dialogue: From Perry Green to Cambridge at New York's Alex Rosenberg Gallery. Twelve of her large-scale sculptures in marble and travertine were shown.

By 2013 Blumenfeld's oeuvre had encompassed over 65 commissioned works for public spaces and private collections. The later years of her career have seen several major retrospective exhibitions of her work including those at the Royal British Society of Sculptors (2008), Pietrasanta in the Piazza del Duomo and Chiesa di Sant'Agostino (2011), Salisbury Cathedral (2013), and Bowman Sculpture in London (2015). The London exhibition, entitled Helaine Blumenfeld – Henry Moore A Dialogue 1985–2015, marked the 30th anniversary of her first exhibit with Henry Moore. Hard Beauty, a documentary film on her life and work, was broadcast on Sky Arts in April 2018. The largest solo exhibition to date of the work of Helaine Blumenfeld was presented at Canary Wharf, London, from 16 March to 18 September 2020. Eight of her artwork, including Meridiana, Mysteries, Taking Risks, Illusion, Fortuna, VENUS, ASCENT, and Metamorphosis, are now displayed and free to visit at Canary Wharf Art Trail.

== Honours ==
Blumenfeld was elected a fellow of the Royal British Society of Sculptors in 2000 and from 2004 to 2009 served as the society's vice-president. In 2007 she became the first female recipient of the Premio Pietrasanta nel Mondo. She received an honorary OBE in 2011.

== Gallery ==
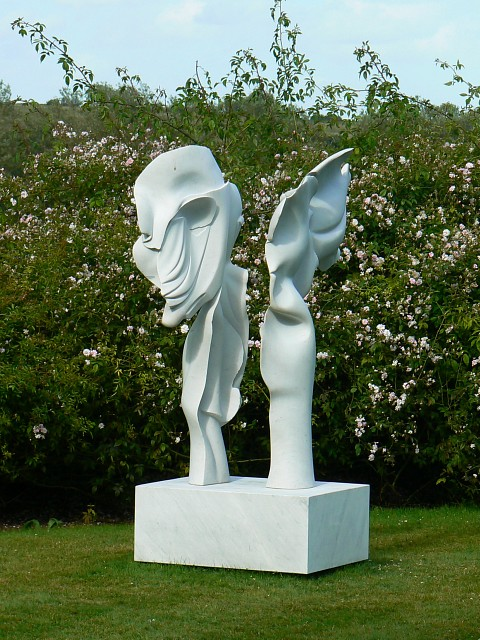
Angels: Harmony, Asthall Manor, Asthall

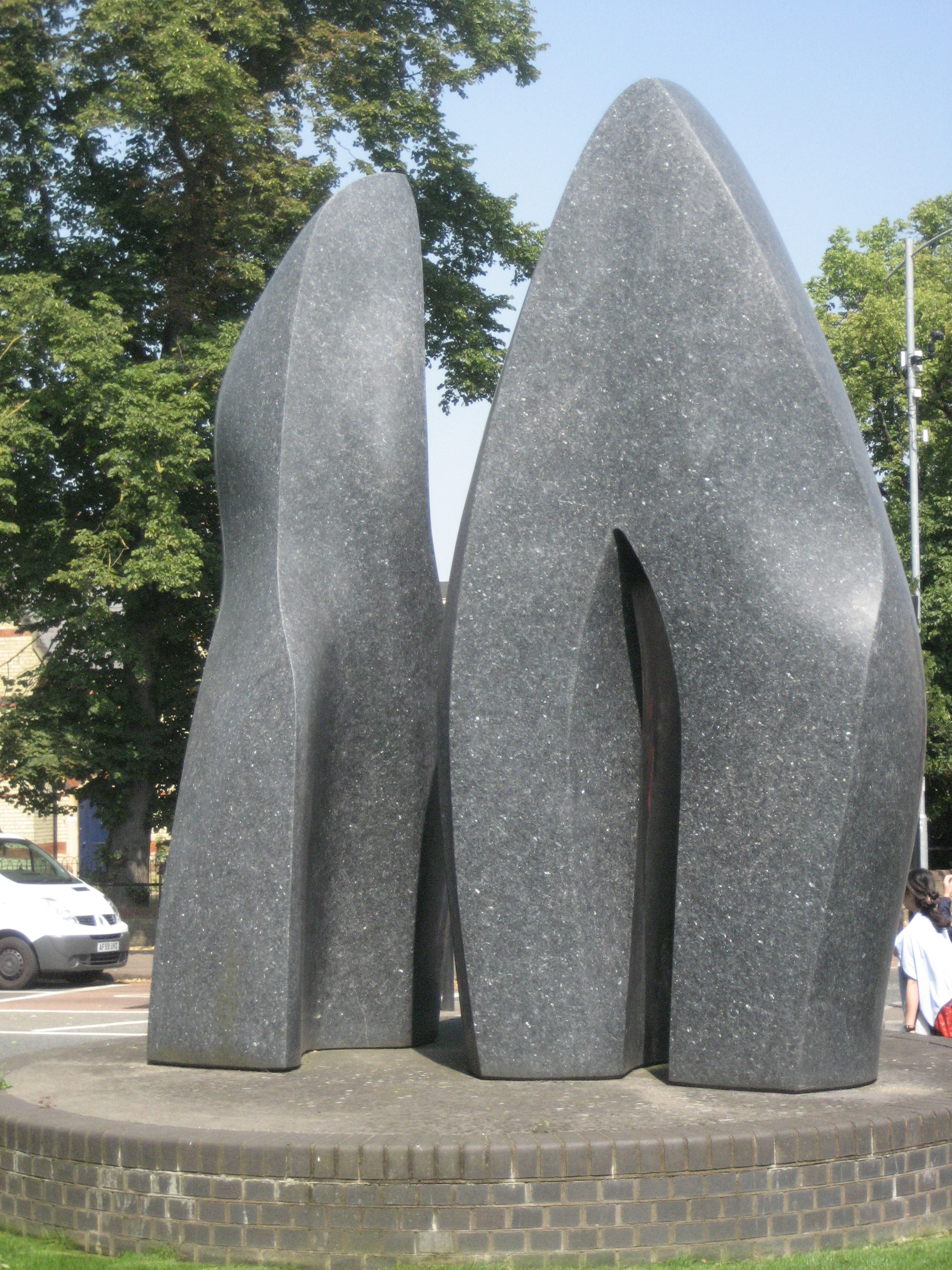
Chauvinist, in Cambridge

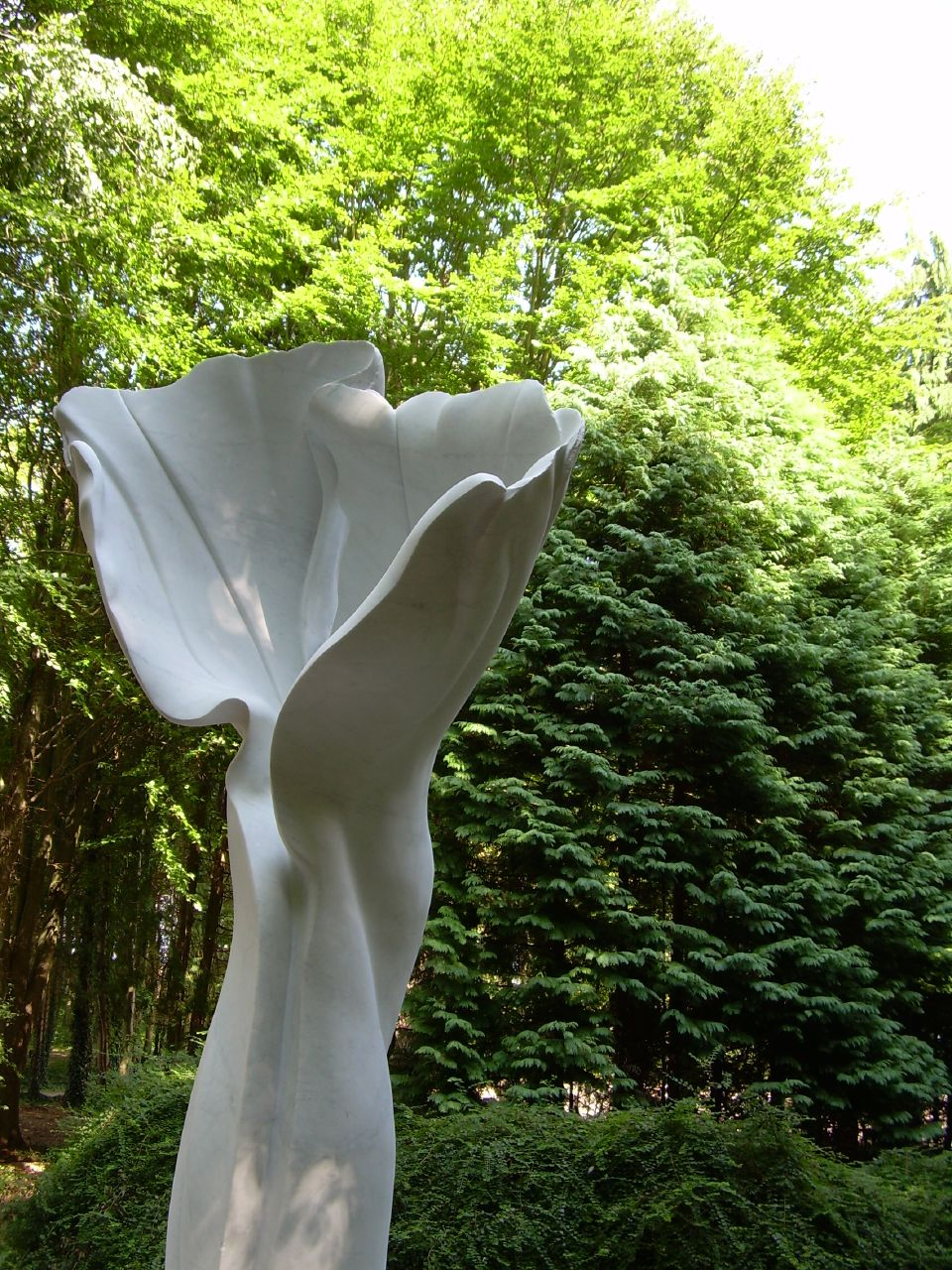
Spirit of Life, Cass Sculpture Foundation, Goodwood

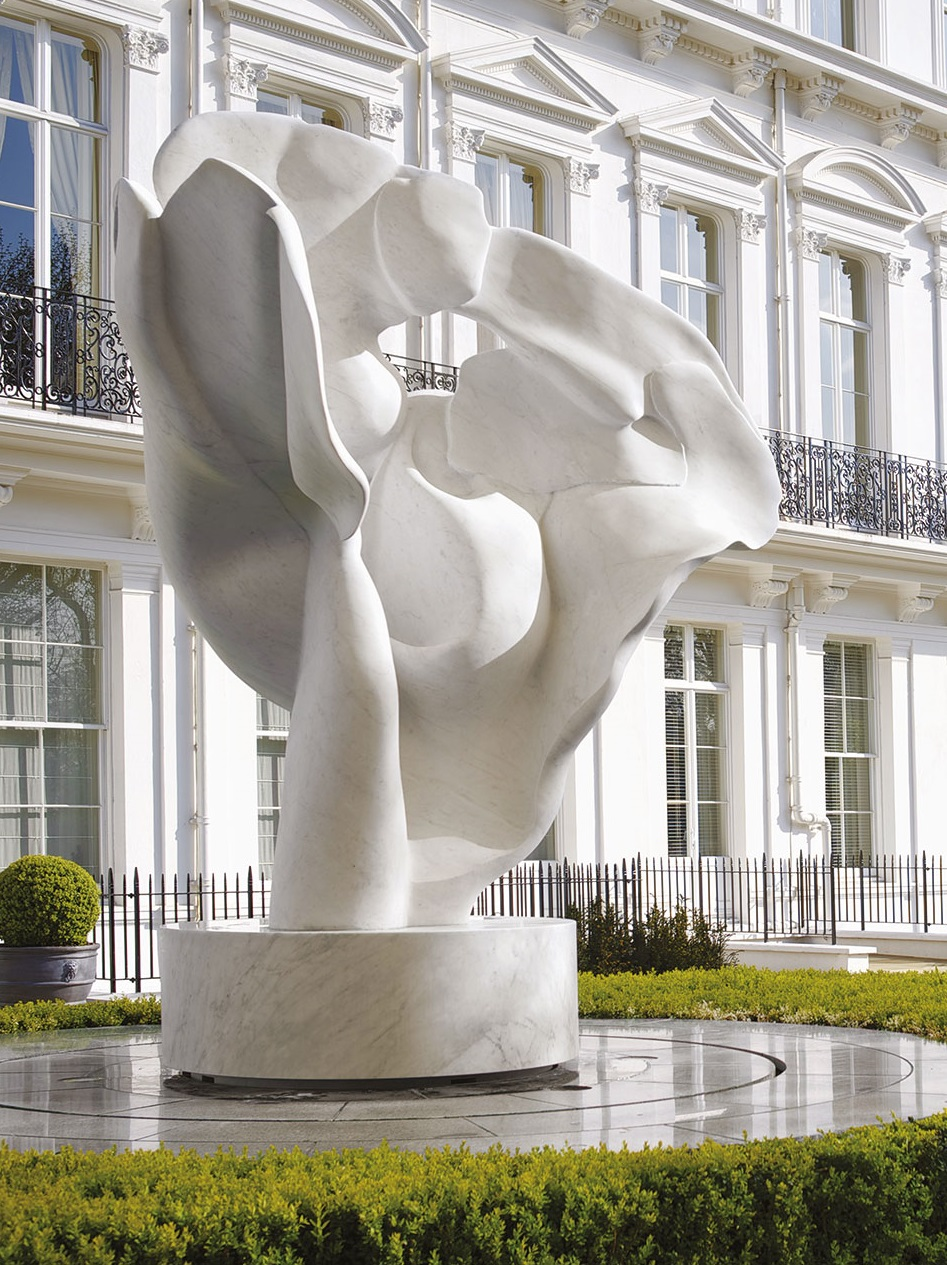
Tempesta, The Lancasters opposite Hyde Park, London

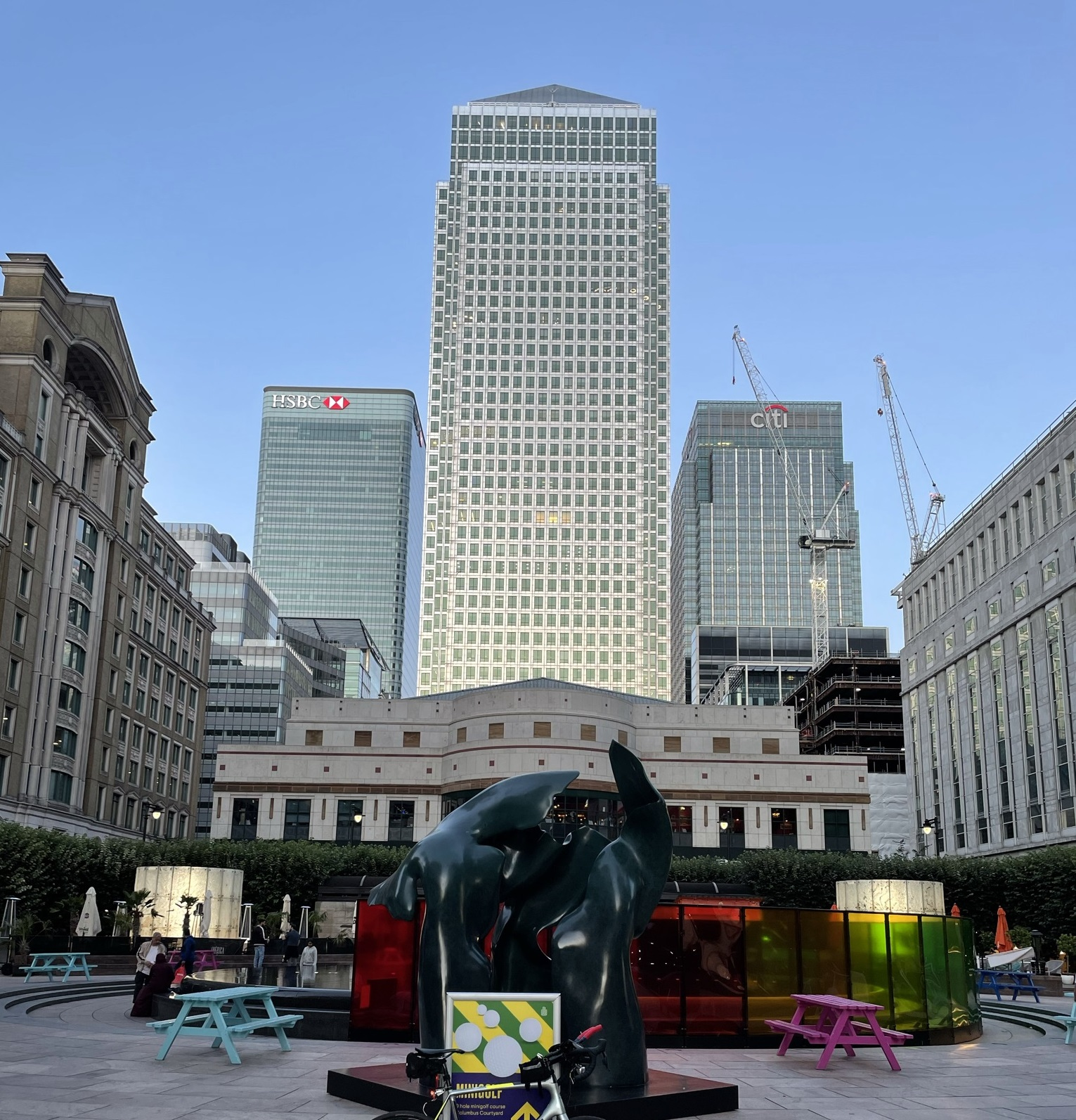
Illusion, Cabot Square, Canary Wharf, London

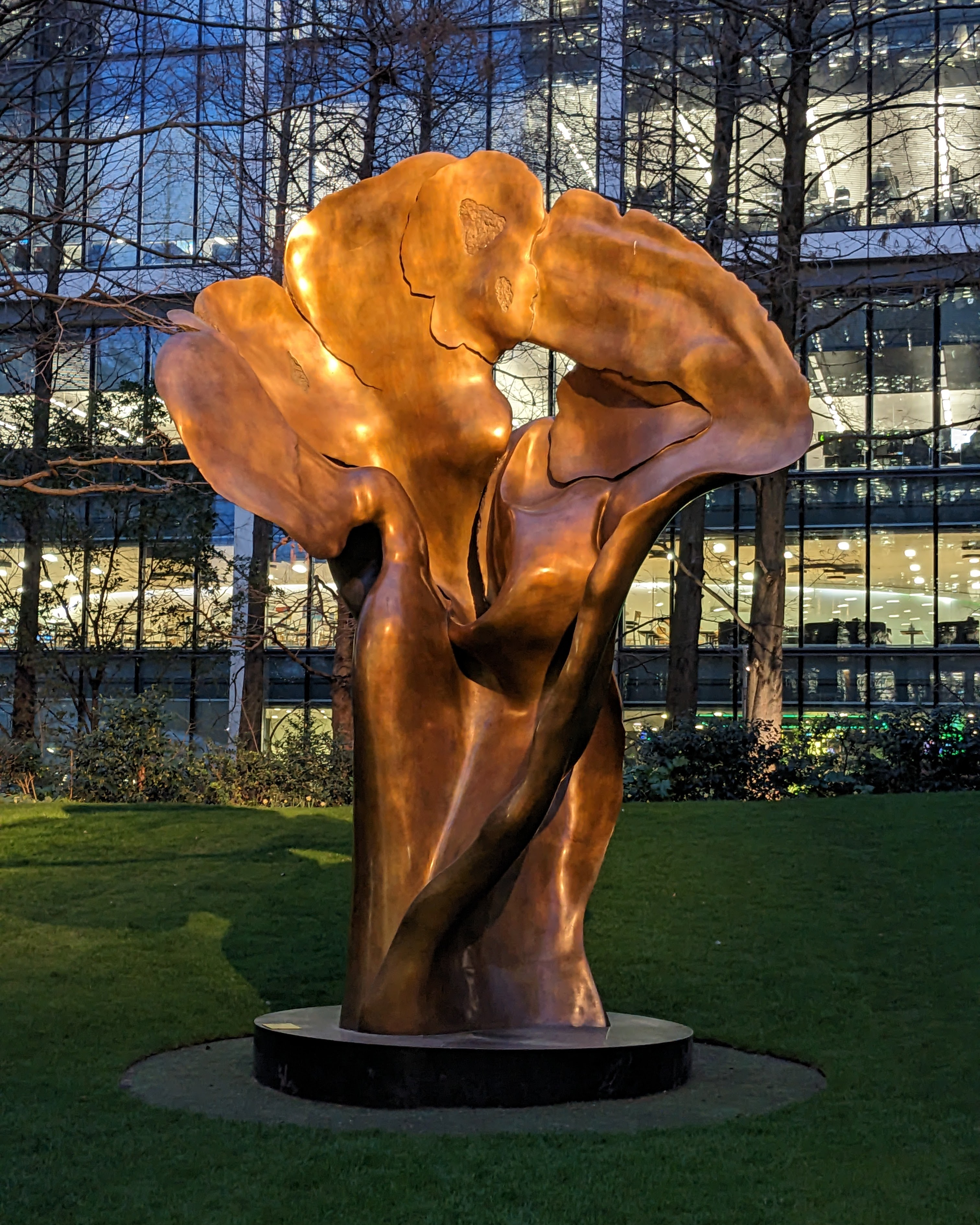
Fortuna, Jubilee Park, Canary Wharf, London

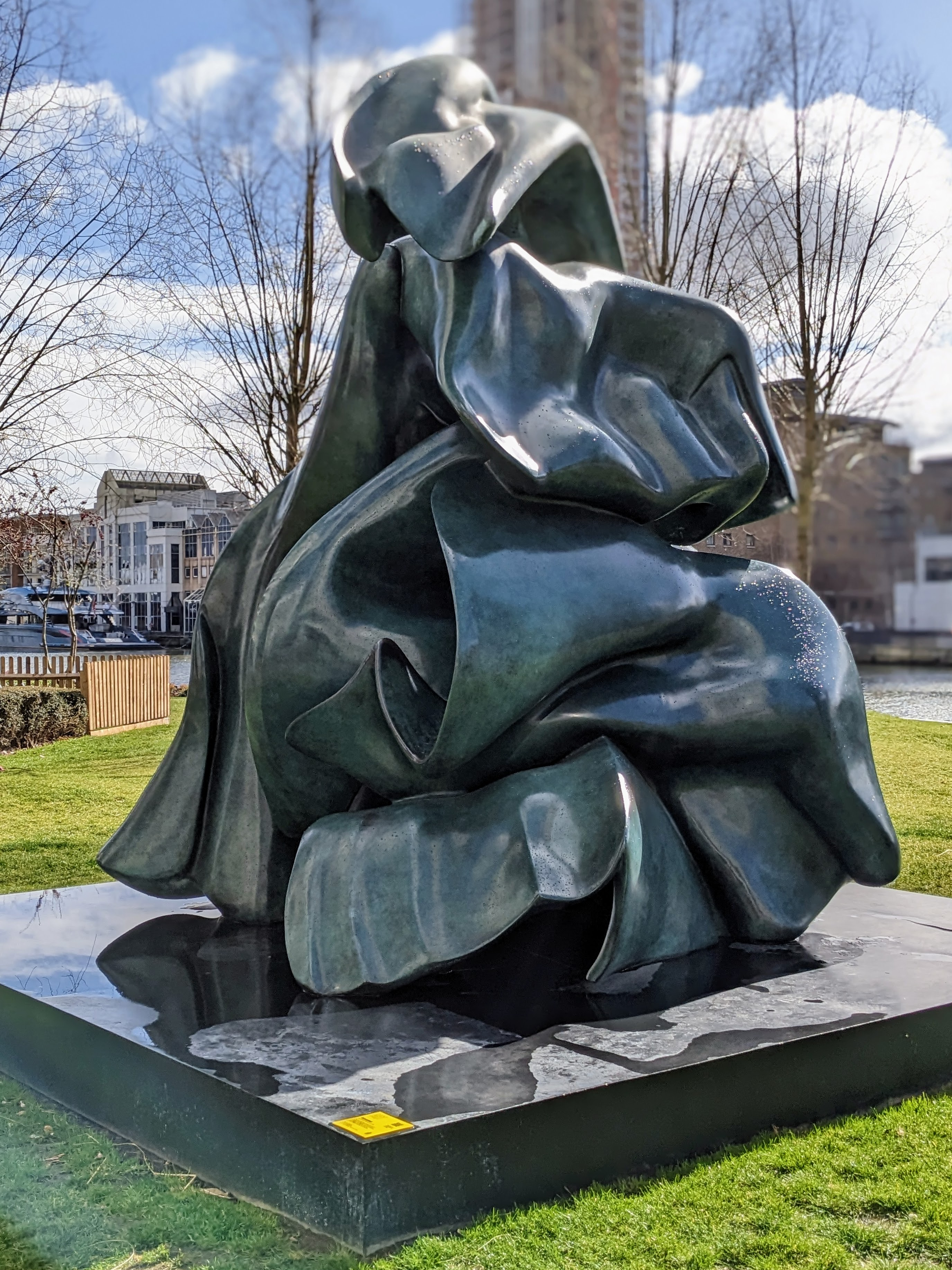
Metamorphosis, Park Drive, Canary Wharf, London
