= Yorick Blumenfeld =

Dutch-born British writer (1932–2024)

- Born: 11 April 1932; Amsterdam, Netherlands
- Died: 8 April 2024 (aged 91); Grantchester, England
- Education: Columbia Grammar School, Harvard University
- Occupation: Writer
- Spouse: Helaine Blumenfeld
- Family: Erwin Blumenfeld (father)

Yorick Blumenfeld (11 April 1932 – 8 April 2024) was a Dutch-born British writer.

== Biography ==
Yorick Blumenfeld was born in Amsterdam on 11 April 1932, the son of Erwin Blumenfeld. In 1941, his family moved to New York City, where he attended Columbia Grammar School. He was at Harvard from 1950 to 1954. In 1999, he edited The Naked and the Veiled, a collection of photographs by his father. He was married to the sculptor Helaine Blumenfeld.

In 1969, he moved to the United Kingdom with his wife, Helaine. They settled in Grantchester, near Cambridge, where he died at his home, on 8 April 2024, at the age of 91. He was survived by his wife Helaine, their sons Remy and Jared, and two grandchildren.

== Publications ==
- Towards The Millennium: Optimistic visions for Change, Chimera Publications
- The Waters of Forgetfulness, Quartet Books
- Jenny, My Diary, Penguin Books
- See-Saw, Harcourt Brace
- The Naked and The Veiled, Thames and Hudson
