= MGIC Investment Corporation =

U.S. financial services company

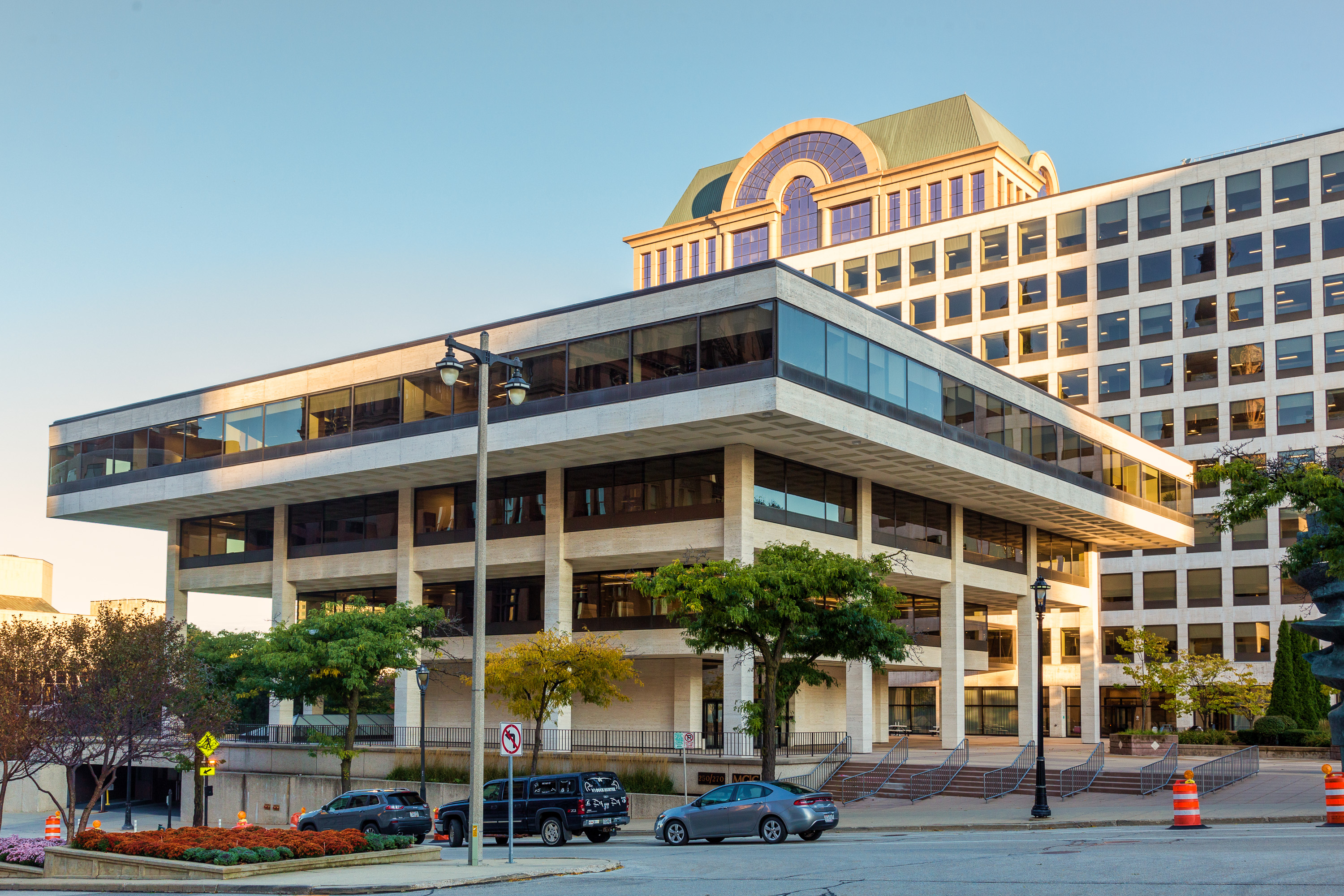
- Company type: Public
- Traded as: NYSE: MTG; S&P 400 component
- Industry: Private Mortgage Insurance
- Founded: 1957
- Founder: Max H. Karl
- Headquarters: Milwaukee, Wisconsin, U.S.
- Website: www.mgic.com

MGIC Investment Corporation NYSE: MTG ("MGIC") is a provider of private mortgage insurance in the United States. The company is headquartered in Milwaukee, Wisconsin.

In addition to mortgage insurance, MGIC provides lenders with various underwriting and other services and products related to home mortgage lending. Today, MGIC serves lenders in the United States, Puerto Rico and Guam with obtaining mortgage insurance.

== History ==
In 1957, the company was founded in Milwaukee by Max H. Karl, a real estate attorney who noticed that his clients were having trouble paying for their new homes. Karl invented modern private mortgage insurance and secured US$250,000 from investors, including friends and business associates, to open MGIC. In 1982, Karl sold the company to Baldwin United for $1.2 billion. In 1983 Baldwin United filed for Chapter 11 bankruptcy protection, and in 1985 MGIC was liquidated and its assets sold to Northwestern Mutual for $775 million. That same year, Karl and others set up a new company with the same name sometimes called "New MGIC." In 1987, Bill Lacy was appointed chairman and chief executive officer of the company. Karl died in 1995. Lacy died in 2016.

Starting in 2007, the subprime mortgage crisis resulted in record insurance claims for MGIC that threatened its ability to maintain its required regulatory capital. In coordination with the Wisconsin Office of the Commissioner of Insurance and Fannie Mae, MGIC reactivated and recapitalized its original business entity (Old MGIC) for underwriting while it took steps to reduce claim exposure for New MGIC. To increase its capital MGIC conducted several offerings of stock and convertible notes; sold its interest in Sherman Financial Group, a debt collector; and discontinued some practices that it had adopted during the housing bubble such as writing insurance on pools of mortgages. By 2013 MGIC had sufficiently stabilized its capital position to focus again on business growth, and in 2018 New MGIC resumed underwriting.

== Headquarters ==
MGIC's four-story headquarters is located at 250 Kilbourn Avenue in downtown Milwaukee. The building was designed in an inverted pyramid shape by Fitzhug Scott-Architects, Inc. and Skidmore, Owings & Merrill and was completed in 1973. The building was extensively renovated by Eppstein Uhen Architects and Hunzinger Construction in 2019.

== Community service ==
MGIC supports many community organizations through donations and volunteering. They currently have programs and campaigns supporting United Way, Junior Achievement, United Performing Arts Fund, Milwaukee Public Television, Habitat for Humanity, Secure Futures and many other nonprofit organizations.

== Honors ==
Mortgage Guaranty Insurance Corporation has been named a "Top Workplace" by the Milwaukee Journal Sentinel every year since 2010.

In 2015, MGIC was one of the winners of the Healthiest Employers awarded by the Milwaukee Business Journal. MGIC received a 2018 Platinum WELCOA Well Workplace Award.
