= Kindred Ties =

Artwork by Evelyn Patricia Terry

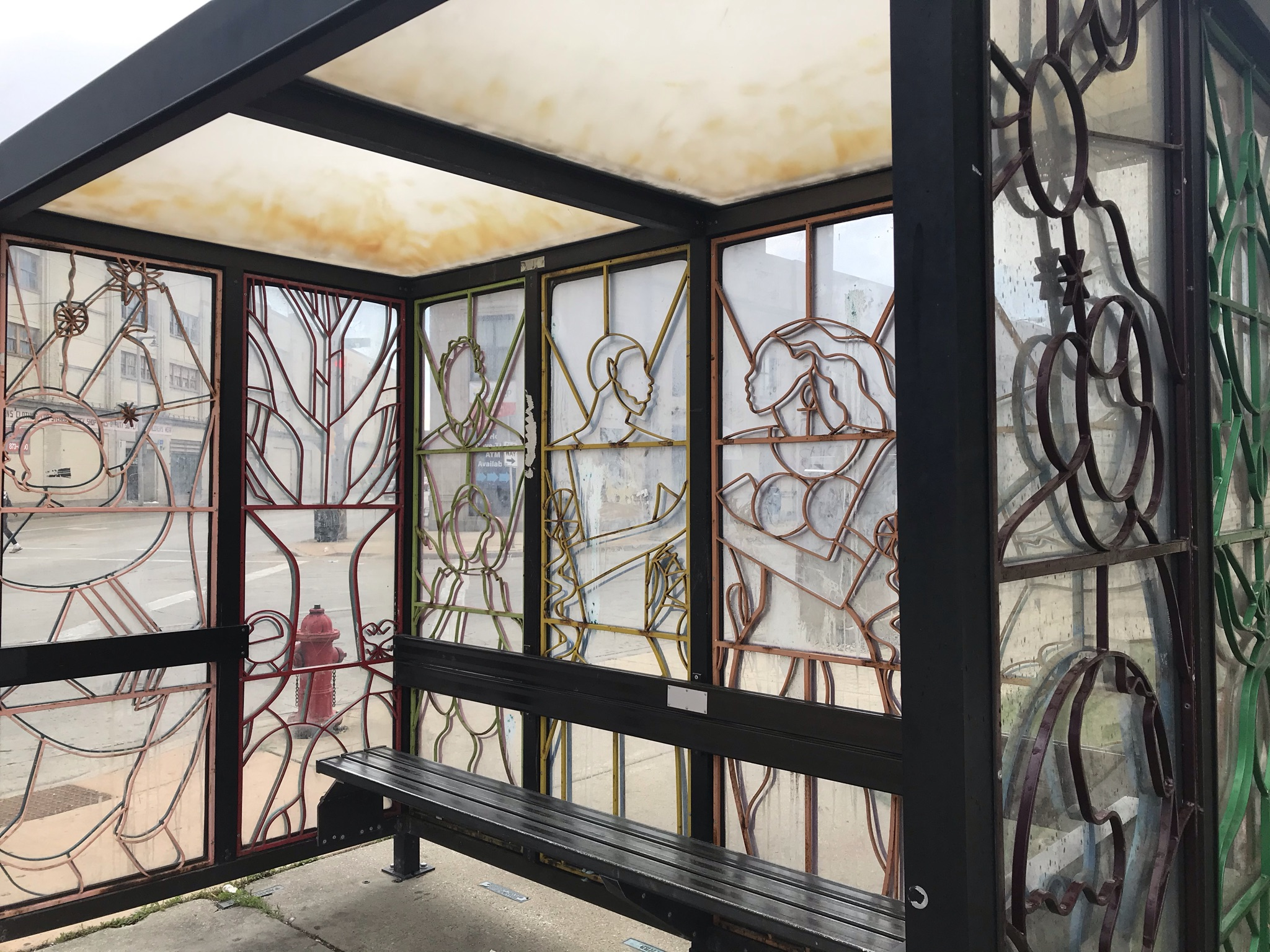
- Artist: Evelyn Patricia Terry
- Year: 2000
- Location: Fond du Lac and North; Milwaukee, Wisconsin; 43.060616°N 87.938728°W
- Owner: Spirit of Milwaukee

Kindred Ties is a work of public art by Evelyn Patricia Terry located near the intersection of Fond du Lac Avenue, North Avenue and 21st Street on the north side of Milwaukee, Wisconsin, United States. The artwork, a bus shelter of painted metal and glass, was commissioned by the Spirit of Milwaukee Neighborhood Millennium Art Initiative. Terry created the work in collaboration with a team of local artists.

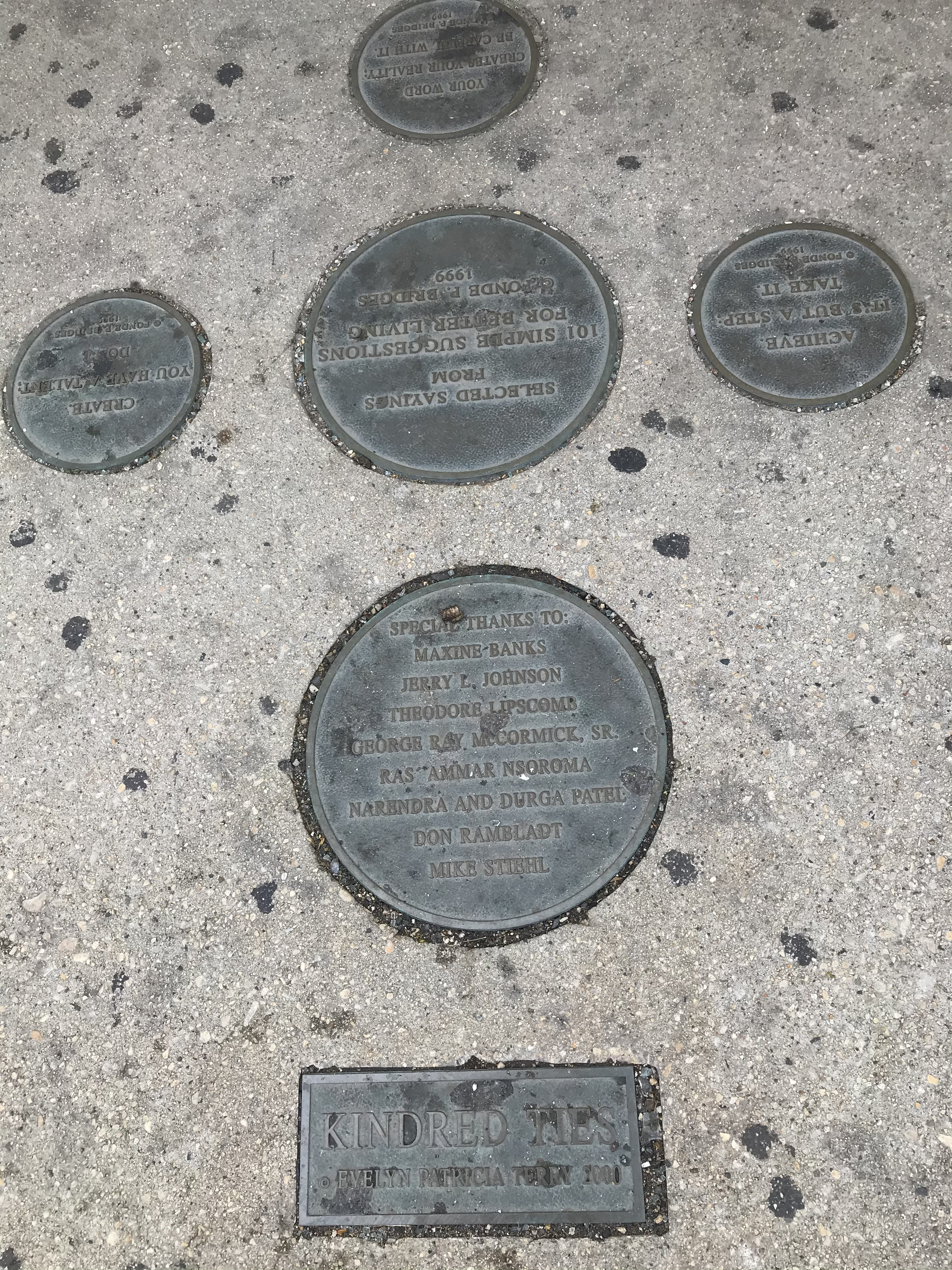
Some of the plaques on the sidewalk under the Kindred Ties bus shelter
