= List of fire department specialty facilities =

This is a list of specialty facilities of fire departments, besides fire stations, and not including fire lookout towers. Specialty functions include:

- supporting separate water systems for firefighting, distinct from the main municipal water systems of cities
- fire alarm headquarters

For buildings which include a fire stations as well as some of these functions, see list of fire stations

Notable specialized facilities include:

in the United Kingdom

- Defence Fire Training and Development Centre
- London Fire Brigade Museum, in former London Fire Brigade headquarters

in the United States

- Pumping Station No. 2 San Francisco Fire Department Auxiliary Water Supply System (1912), which supports the separate firefighting water supply system in San Francisco, California
- Fire Alarm, Telegraph and Police Signaling Building, Troy, New York
- Tulsa Fire Alarm Building, Tulsa, Oklahoma
- Fire Alarm Station, Tacoma, Washington
- Milwaukee Fire Department High Pressure Pumping Station (1931), in Milwaukee, Wisconsin, which provided high pressure water to fight fires in an industrial area, replacing use of a fireboat
- Fire Department Headquarters-Fire Alarm Headquarters, Washington, D.C.

For training, numerous, often included in fire station facilities, but sometimes separate:

- Drill tower

== See also ==
- Fireboat Station, Tacoma, Washington
- List of fire stations
- List of firefighting monuments and memorials
- List of firefighting museums
