= Golden Fire Hydrant =

Sculpture in San Francisco, California, U.S.

The Golden Fire Hydrant
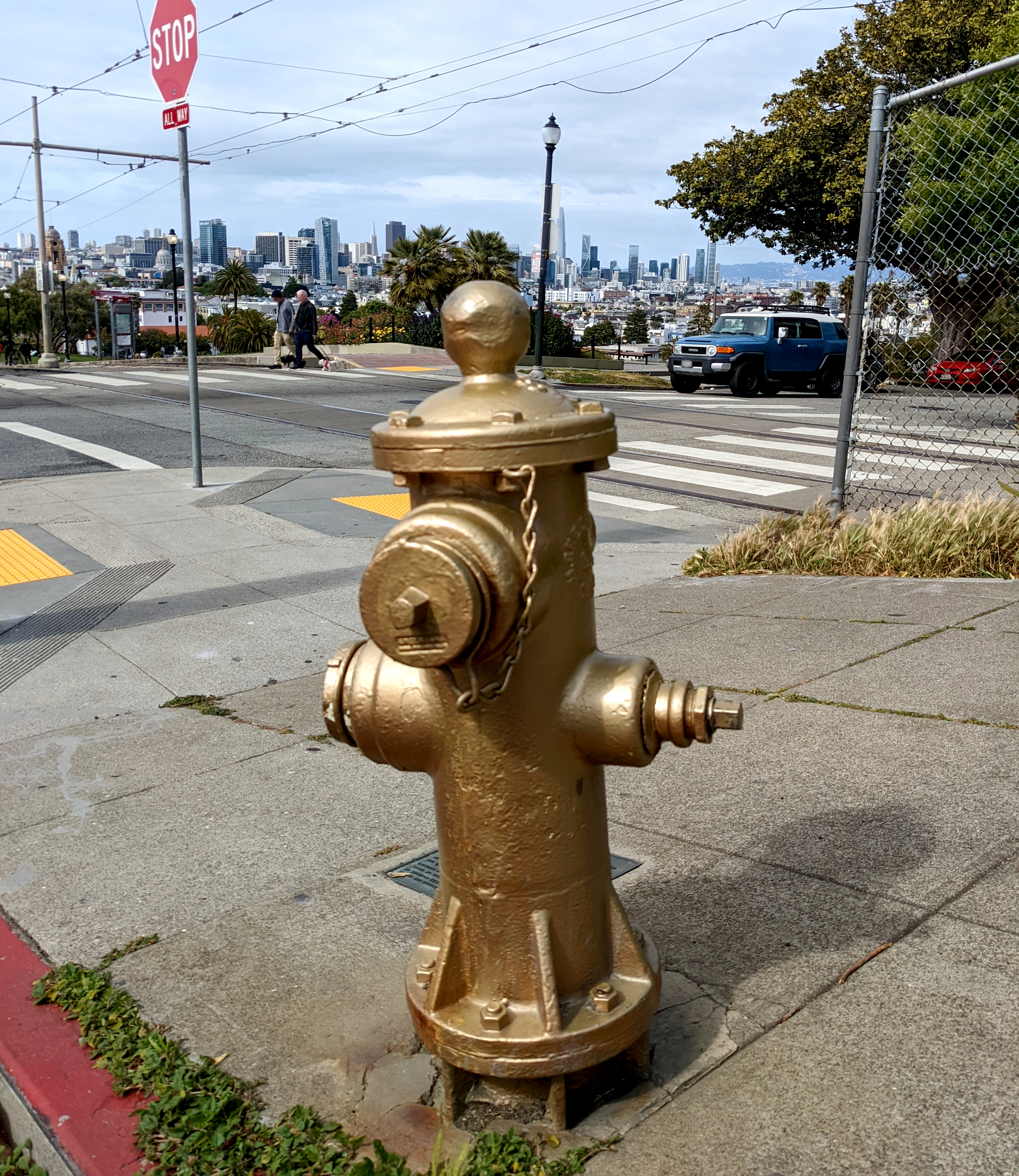
- Photograph of the Golden Fire Hydrant near Dolores Park in San Francisco, California
- Interactive map of The Golden Fire Hydrant
- Location: 3899 20th St San Francisco, CA
- Coordinates: 37.758009°N 122.427952°W
- Designer: Maurice Greenberg and Sons
- Dedicated date: April 18, 1966
- Dedicated to: "Chief Dennis Sullivan and the men who fought the Great Fire and to the spirit of the people of San Francisco"

The Golden Fire Hydrant (also called "the Little Giant") is a fire hydrant on the corner of Dolores Park in the Mission District of San Francisco. The hydrant is celebrated for being one of the few functioning hydrants after the 1906 San Francisco earthquake. The earthquake broke many of the cisterns and water mains, and most of the damages from the earthquake came from the subsequent fires in the eastern part of the city that lasted for three days. The San Francisco Fire Department used this fire hydrant to stop the fires from spreading through the Mission District.

== Annual Celebration ==
In the 1960s, dentist and historian Doc Bulloch began the annual tradition of painting it on the anniversary of the fire, April 18.

In 1966, it was dedicated by the Upper Noe Valley Neighborhood Council to "Chief Dennis Sullivan and the men who fought the Great Fire and to the spirit of the people of San Francisco." Chief Dennis Sullivan was the fire chief who was killed by a falling chimney from the California Hotel during the earthquake.

The San Francisco History Association has painted it gold every year except 2012. That year, the Association's president bought silver paint by accident and, because they painted it before the sun rose, the celebrants only noticed their mistake once they were finished. The hydrant was repainted gold shortly thereafter.

== Legacy ==
The importance of functioning fire hydrants during the 1906 earthquake inspired the San Francisco government to invest in the San Francisco Fire Department Auxiliary Water Supply System.
