= Milwaukee Fire Department =

Fire department in Wisconsin, US

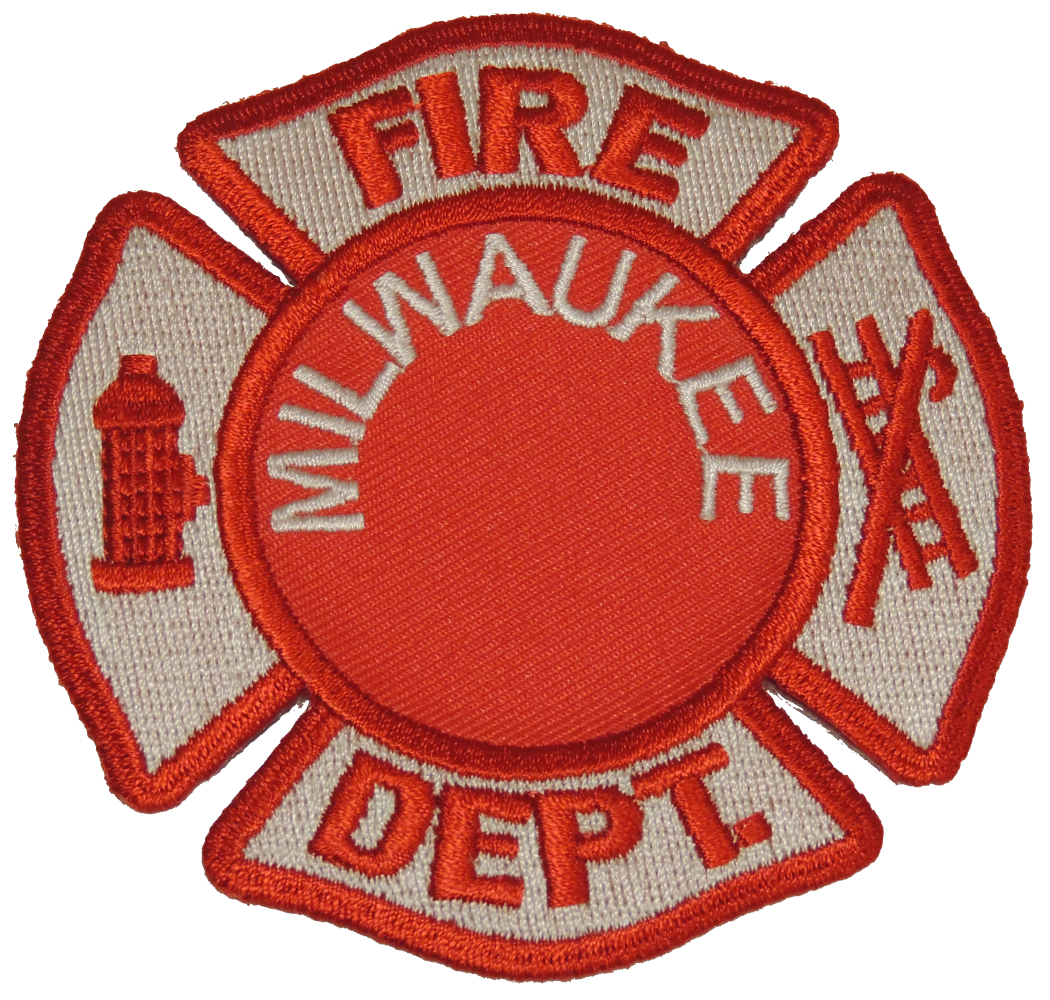

Operational area
- Country: United States
- State: Wisconsin
- City: Milwaukee
- Address: 711 West Wells Street
- Coordinates: 43.03984300°N 87.92073200°W

Agency overview
- Established: 1875
- Annual calls: 93,029 (2019)
- Employees: 871 (2019)
- Annual budget: $116,333,388 (2019)
- Staffing: Career
- Fire chief: Aaron Lipski
- EMS level: ALS and BLS
- IAFF: 215
- Motto: Courage, Integrity and Honor

Facilities and equipment
- Battalions: 6
- Stations: 29
- Engines: 29
- Trucks: 8
- Rescues: 2
- Ambulances: 12
- HAZMAT: 2
- USAR: 1
- Fireboats: 1

Website
- city.milwaukee.gov/MFD
- IAFF website

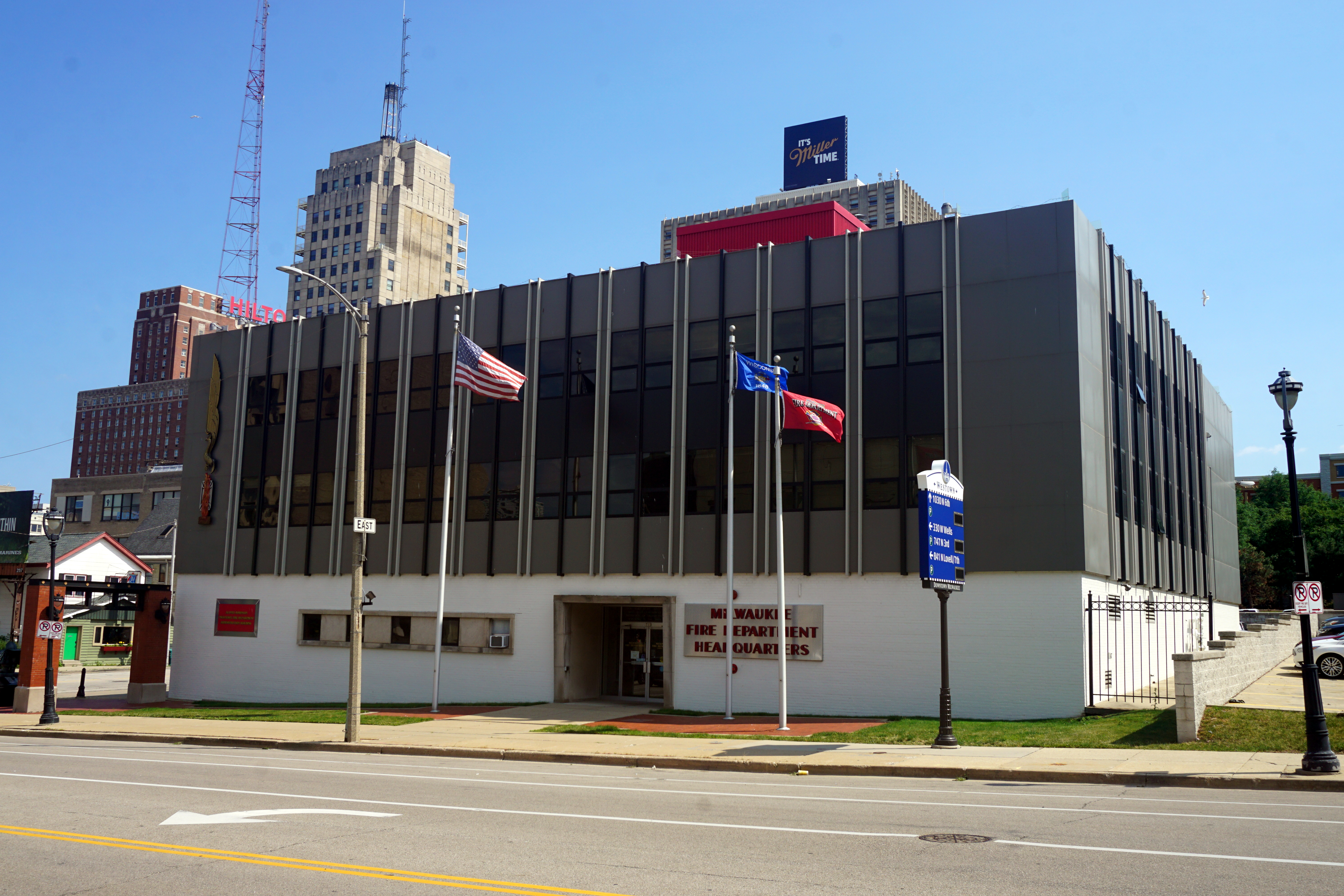
Milwaukee Fire Department Headquarters (designed by architect Alonzo Robinson, Jr.)

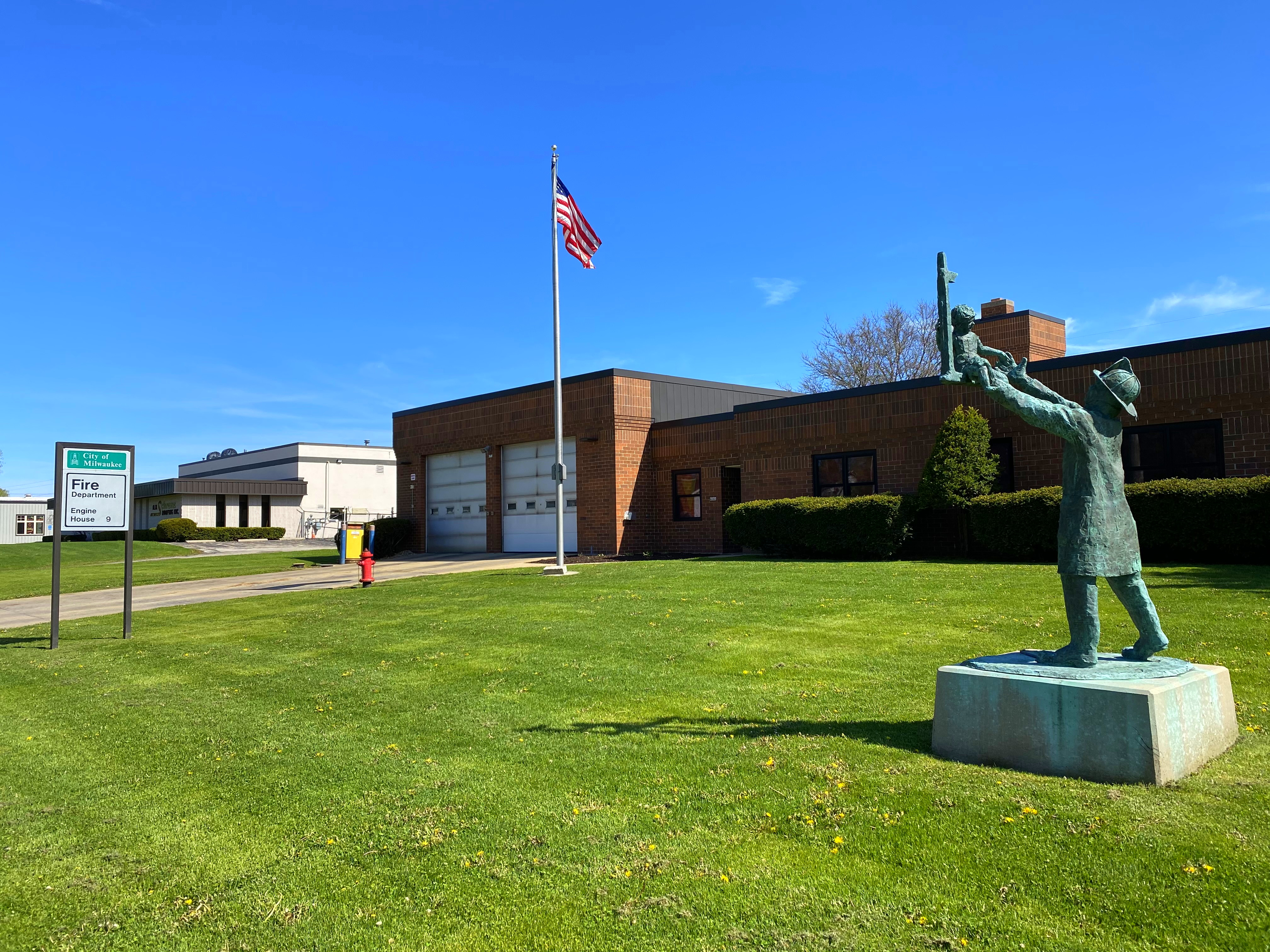
Milwaukee Fire Station 9, located at 4141 West Mill Road, houses Engine 9 and Med 4.

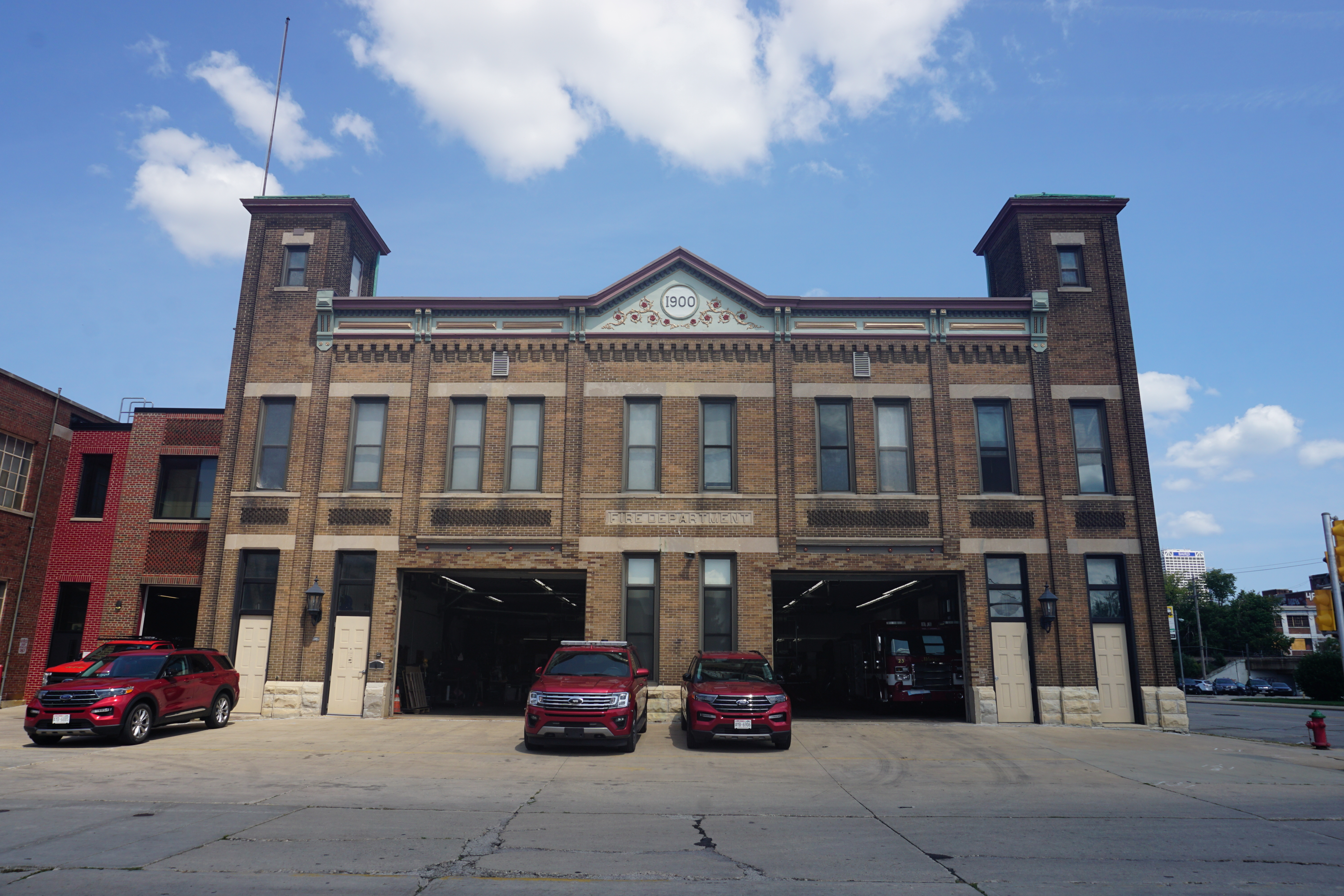
Milwaukee Fire Department Construction and Maintenance Division

The Milwaukee Fire Department provides fire protection and emergency medical services to the city of Milwaukee, Wisconsin. The department is responsible for an area of 96.12 square miles (248.9 km^{2}) with a population of 594,833. It is the largest fire department in the State of Wisconsin.

== History ==
Milwaukee’s fire department began as a volunteer effort in 1837 with the creation of the village of Milwaukee. The first company, Hook and Ladder No. 1, included Alexander Mitchell. By 1859, there were some eleven volunteer firefighting companies in the city. In 1875, the Milwaukee Fire Department was officially established and the full-time career department was formed. The department included individuals that resonate with Milwaukee’s history: Solomon Juneau, Dousman, Auer, Ludington and Elisha W. Edgerton to name a few.

In 1885, the department boasted a total work force of 119 men, ten steam engines and two chemical engines.

The Newhall House Hotel Fire is the deadliest fire in Milwaukee's history on January 10, 1883. A porter discovered the fire at about 3 a.m. when the elevator he was in began to fill with smoke. At least 70 people perished in the fire. On April 9, 1894, a fire broke out in the Davidson Theater that killed nine firemen and injured fifteen.

In 1931, the Milwaukee Fire Department High Pressure Pumping Station was built to replace the function of Fireboat No. 17, which was located in an area of heavy industry and where streets, railway tracks, bridges and the Kinnickinnic River crossed multiple times. The station closed in 1950 and the building would later operate as a brewpub from 2009 until 2015 when the property was listed for sale. The building was demolished in 2018.

Debra Pross was hired as the first female firefighter in Milwaukee's history in 1983.

In January 2020, Milwaukee firefighters Jeff Lang and Craig Parello joined Team Rubicon co-founders William McNulty and Jacob Wood to lead a medical team into Port-au-Prince three days after the Haiti earthquake. The four men wore uniforms consisting of military BDU pants and navy blue Milwaukee Fire Department shirts in an effort to convey some semblance of being official.

In November 2018, for the first time ever in the department's history, an all-female crew responded to emergency calls. In December 2019, Sharon Purifoy became the first African American female deputy chief of the Milwaukee Fire Department.

== Survive Alive House ==
The Survive Alive House is a building located on Milwaukee's south side that teaches fire safety to children. It is a joint endeavor with the Milwaukee Fire Department and Milwaukee Public Schools. Since opening in 1992, over 450,000 students have visited.

The building opened in 1992 and is designed to teach second though fifth grade students in Milwaukee fire safety and fire prevention techniques.

In April 2019, the Milwaukee Fire Department rolled out a mobile Survive Alive House. The RV was built by REV Recreation Group and features two bedroom-style classrooms with smoke evacuation training.

== Stations and apparatus ==
As of April 2021, the Milwaukee Fire Department operates out of 29 fire stations, with 28 being in the City of Milwaukee and one being located in the Village of West Milwaukee. A fire engine is housed at each station as well as several other firefighting apparatus including ladder trucks and heavy rescues. A fire boat is docked at the Discovery World Pier at Milwaukee Harbor.

The department also operates 12 ambulances which provided Advanced life support and Basic life support services. The City of Milwaukee contracts with Bell Ambulance and Curtis Ambulance to provide additional emergency medical services throughout the city.

In 2019, the busiest fire station was Station 30, located at North Teutonia Avenue and East Locust Street.

A number of closed fire stations are occupied for other uses. The not-for-profit Milwaukee Fire Bell Club operates out of the shuttered Fire Station 25 and the fire department's Community Relations Division is located in the former Fire Station 6 in the city's Brady Street neighborhood.

== See also ==
- Fireboats of Milwaukee
