= AWSS =

AWSS can refer to:

- Association for Women in Slavic Studies
- Automated Weather Sensor System
- San Francisco Fire Department Auxiliary Water Supply System
