= Pumping Station No. 2 San Francisco Fire Department Auxiliary Water Supply System =

- U.S. National Register of Historic Places
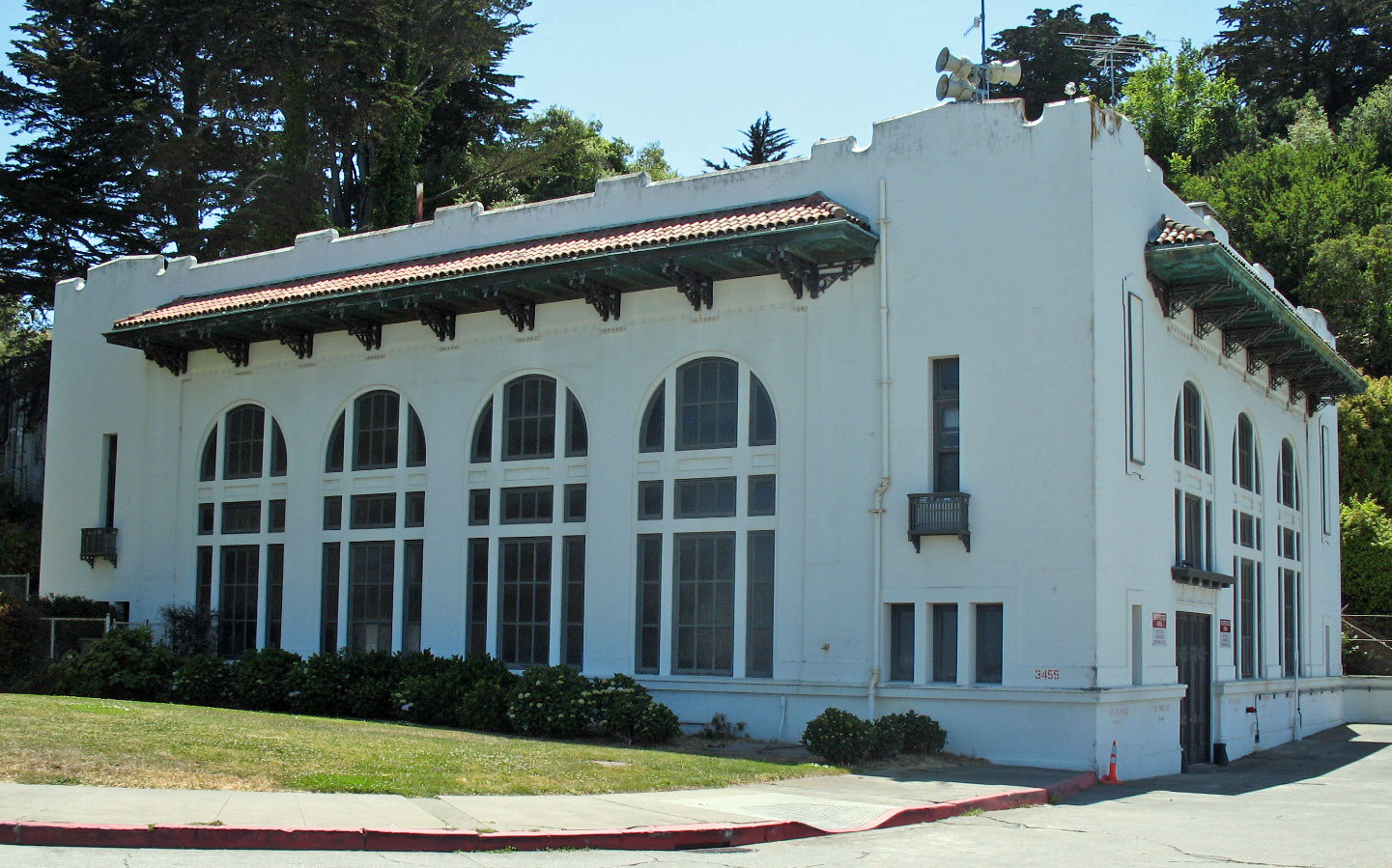

- Location within California
- Location: N end of Van Ness Ave, San Francisco, California
- Coordinates: 37°48′29″N 122°25′37″W
- Area: 1 acre (0.40 ha)
- Built: 1912
- Built by: Caldwell & Co.
- Engineer: Marsden Manson
- Architectural style: Mission/spanish Revival
- NRHP reference No.: 76000177
- Added to NRHP: May 13, 1976

The Pumping Station No. 2 of the San Francisco Fire Department Auxiliary Water Supply System was built in 1912. It is located near Fort Mason, at the northern end of Van Ness Avenue and close to the shore of the San Francisco Bay. It was listed on the National Register of Historic Places in 1976. The listing included a contributing building and three contributing structures.

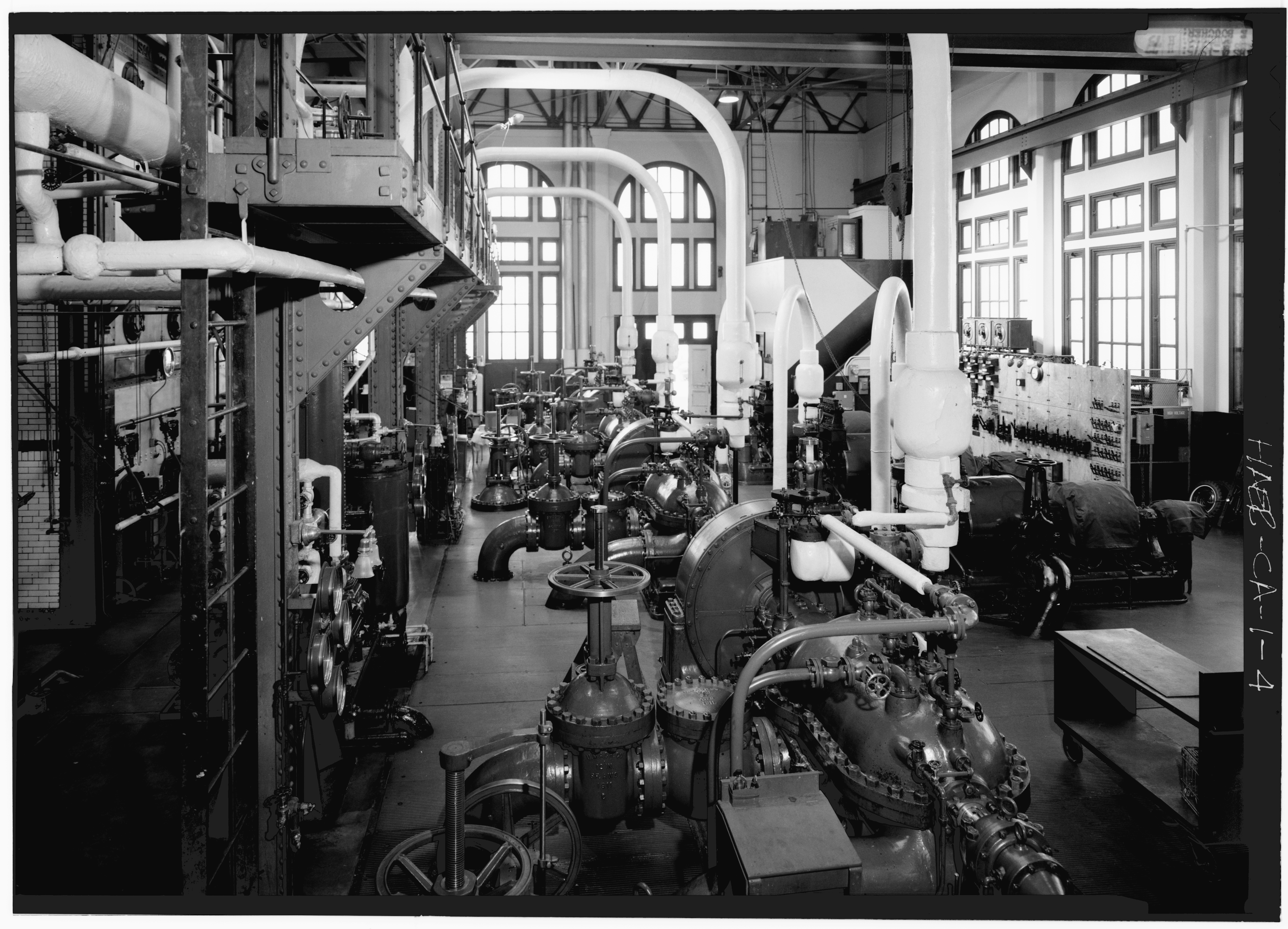
The interior of the station in 1975

It is a crucial component of the San Francisco Fire Department Auxiliary Water Supply System, which provided a water-supply system separate from the domestic water supply system.

It was designed by City Engineer Marsden Manson and was built by contractor Caldwell & Co.

The building is in Mission Revival style, and has large windows (about 12 feet (3.7 m) wide and about 20 feet (6.1 m) from sill to top of arch).
