= Cistern =

Waterproof receptacle for holding liquids, usually water

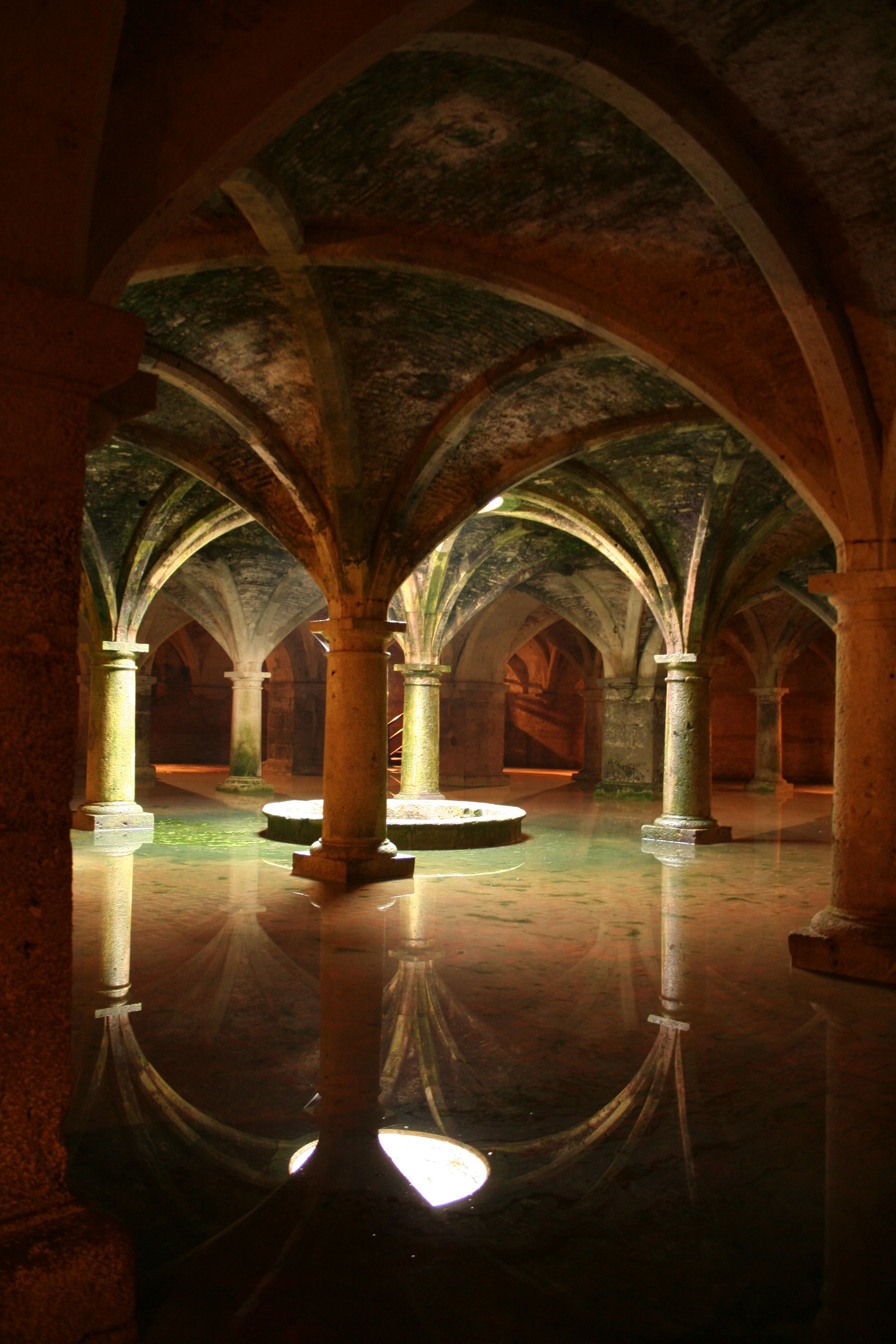
Portuguese cistern (Mazagan), El Jadida, Morocco (1514)

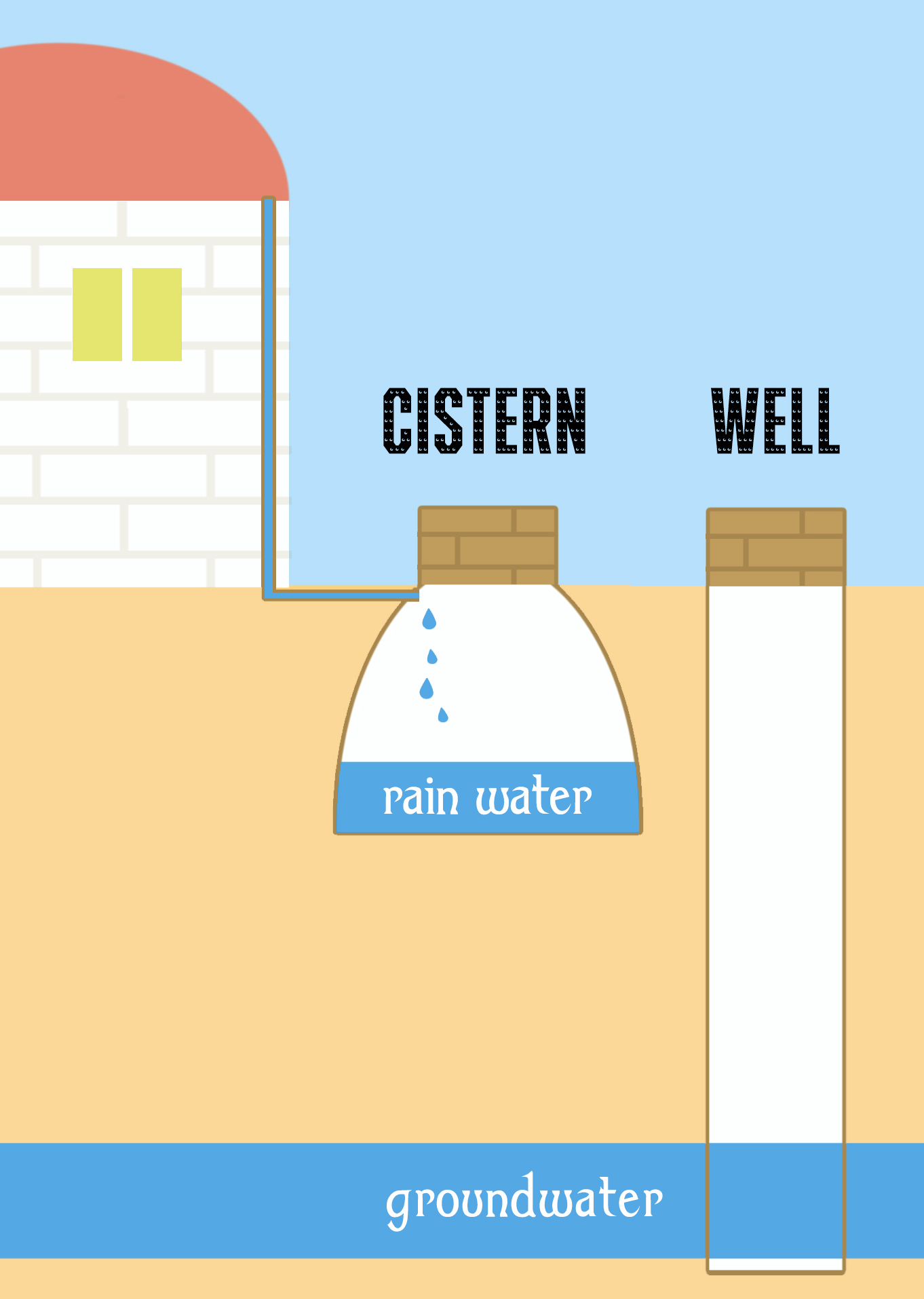
The difference between a cistern and a well is in the source of the water: A cistern collects fresh water where a well draws from groundwater.

A cistern (from Middle English cisterne; from Latin cisterna, from cista 'box'; from Ancient Greek κίστη (kístē) 'basket') is a waterproof receptacle for holding liquids, usually water. Cisterns are often built to catch and store rainwater. To prevent leakage, the interior of the cistern is often lined with hydraulic plaster.

Cisterns are distinguished from wells by their waterproof linings. Modern cisterns range in capacity from a few liters to thousands of cubic meters, effectively forming covered reservoirs.

== Origins ==
=== Early domestic and agricultural use ===
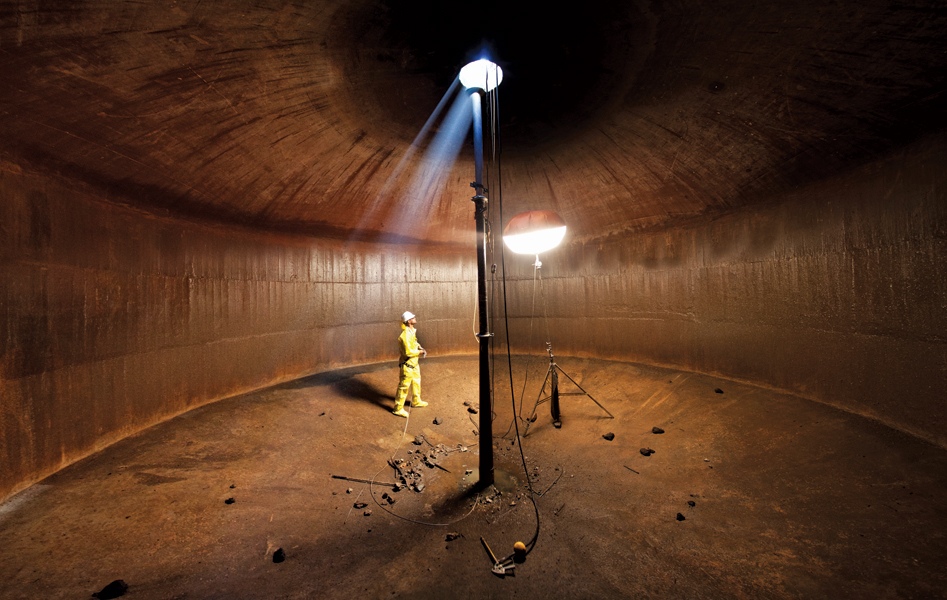
A modern-day cistern, located in San Francisco, California, for emergency firefighting purposes.

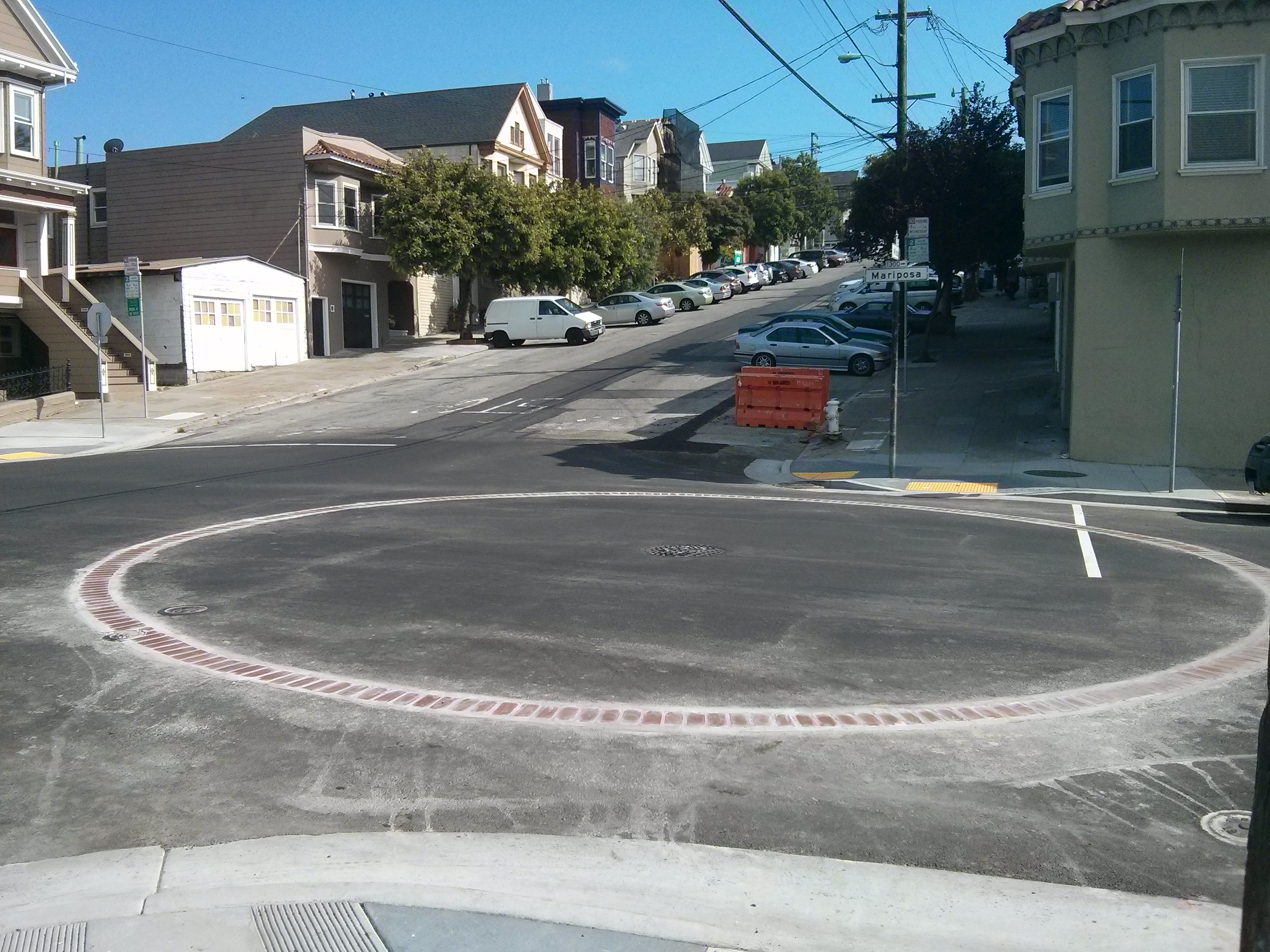
The street-level view of the aforementioned cistern.

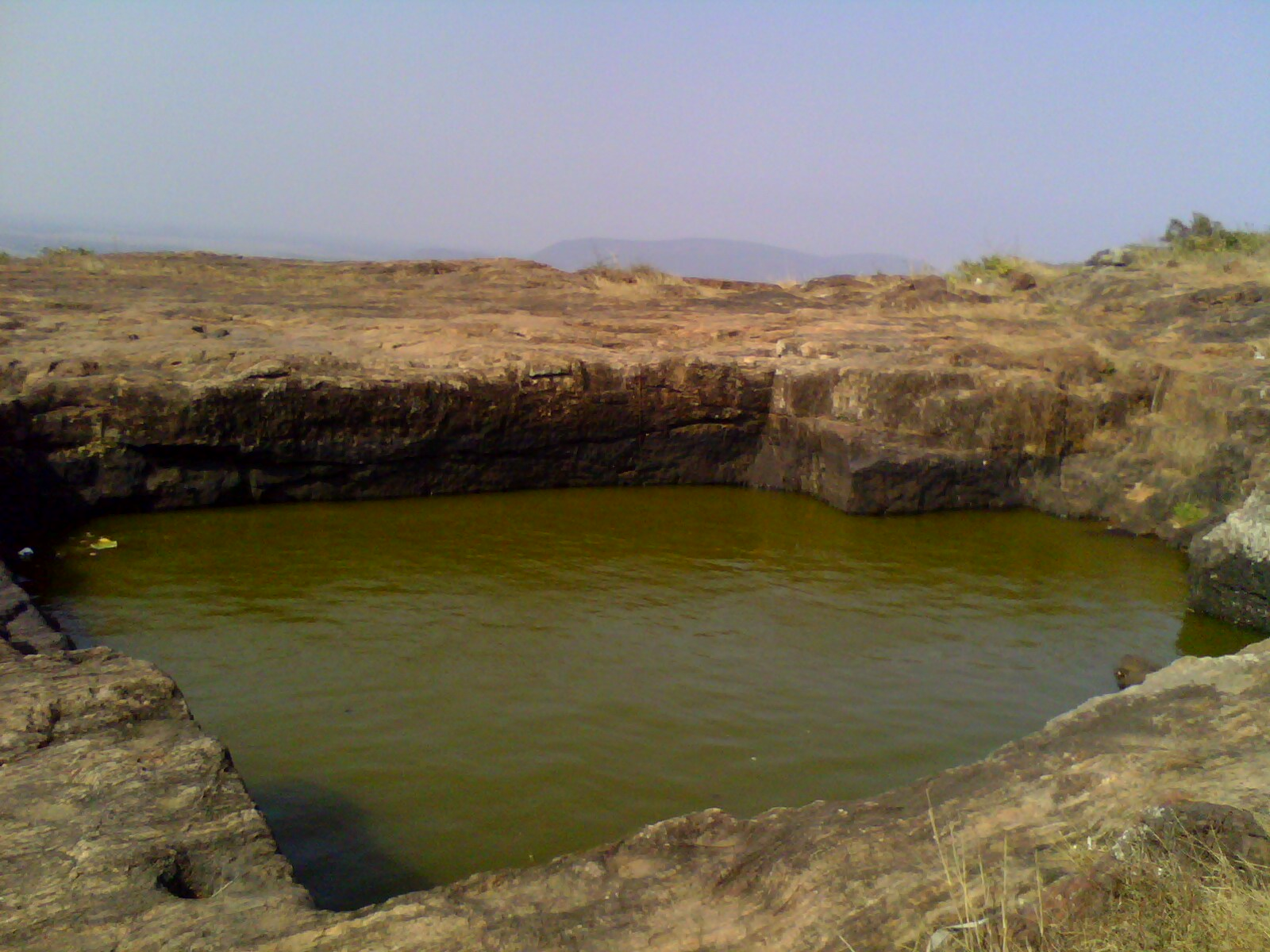
Ancient Buddhist rock-hewn cistern at Pavurallakonda in India

Waterproof lime plaster cisterns in the floors of houses are features of Neolithic village sites of the Levant at, for instance, Ramad and Lebwe, and by the late fourth millennium BC at Jawa in northeastern Lebanon. Cisterns are essential elements of emerging water management techniques in dry-land farming communities.

Early examples of ancient cisterns, found in Israel, include a significant discovery at Tel Hazor, where a large cistern was carved into bedrock beneath a palace dating to the Late Bronze Age. Similar systems were uncovered at Ta'anakh. In the Iron Age, underground water systems were constructed in royal centers and settlements throughout ancient Israel, marking some of the earliest instances of engineering activity in urban planning.

The Ancient Roman impluvium, a standard feature of the domus house, generally had a cistern underneath. The impluvium and associated structures collected, filtered, cooled, and stored the water, and also cooled and ventilated the house.

=== Castle cisterns ===
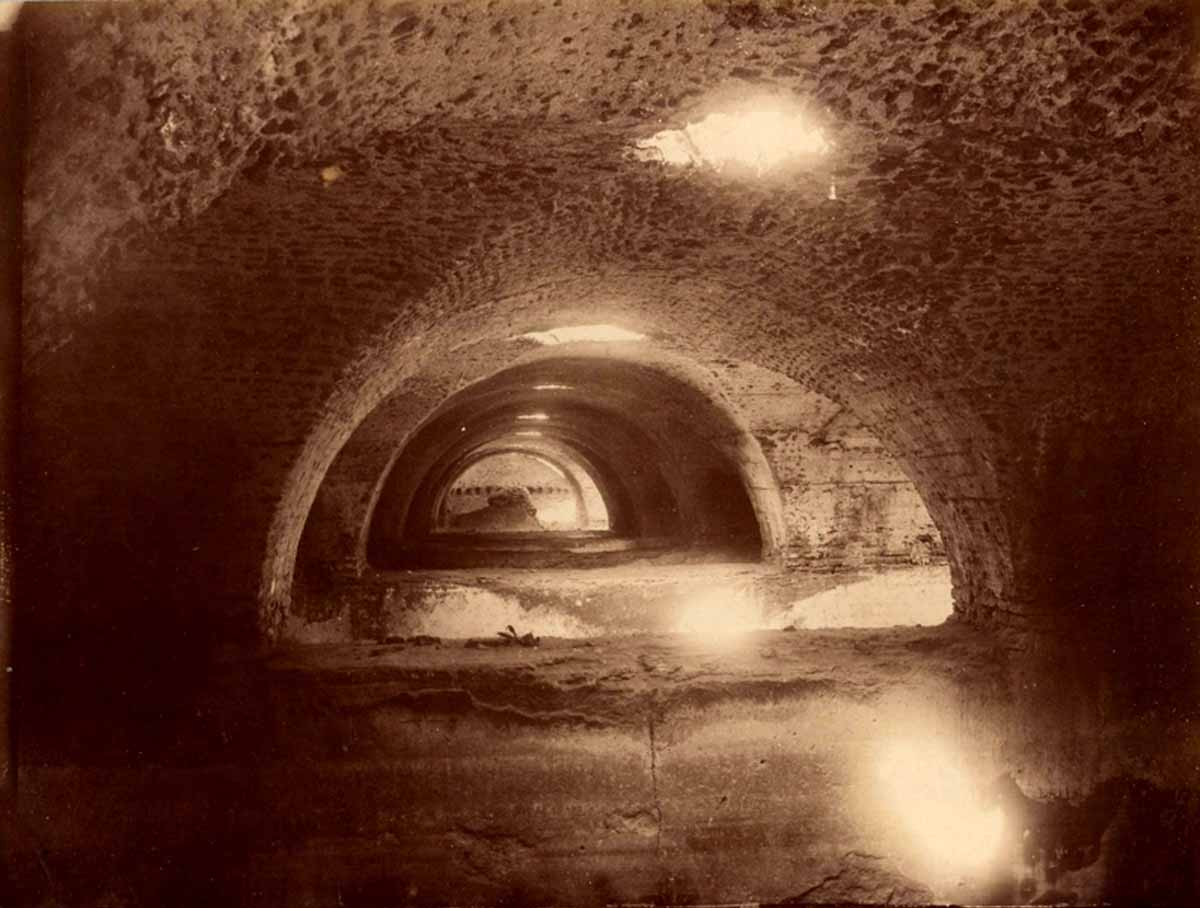
One of the Cisterns of La Malga, Carthage, 1930

In the Middle Ages, cisterns were often constructed in hill castles in Europe, especially where wells could not be dug deeply enough. There were two types: the tank cistern and the filter cistern. Such a filter cistern was built at the Riegersburg in Austrian Styria, where a cistern was hewn out of the lava rock. Rain water passed through a sand filter and collected in the cistern. The filter cleaned the rain water and enriched it with minerals.

== Present-day use ==
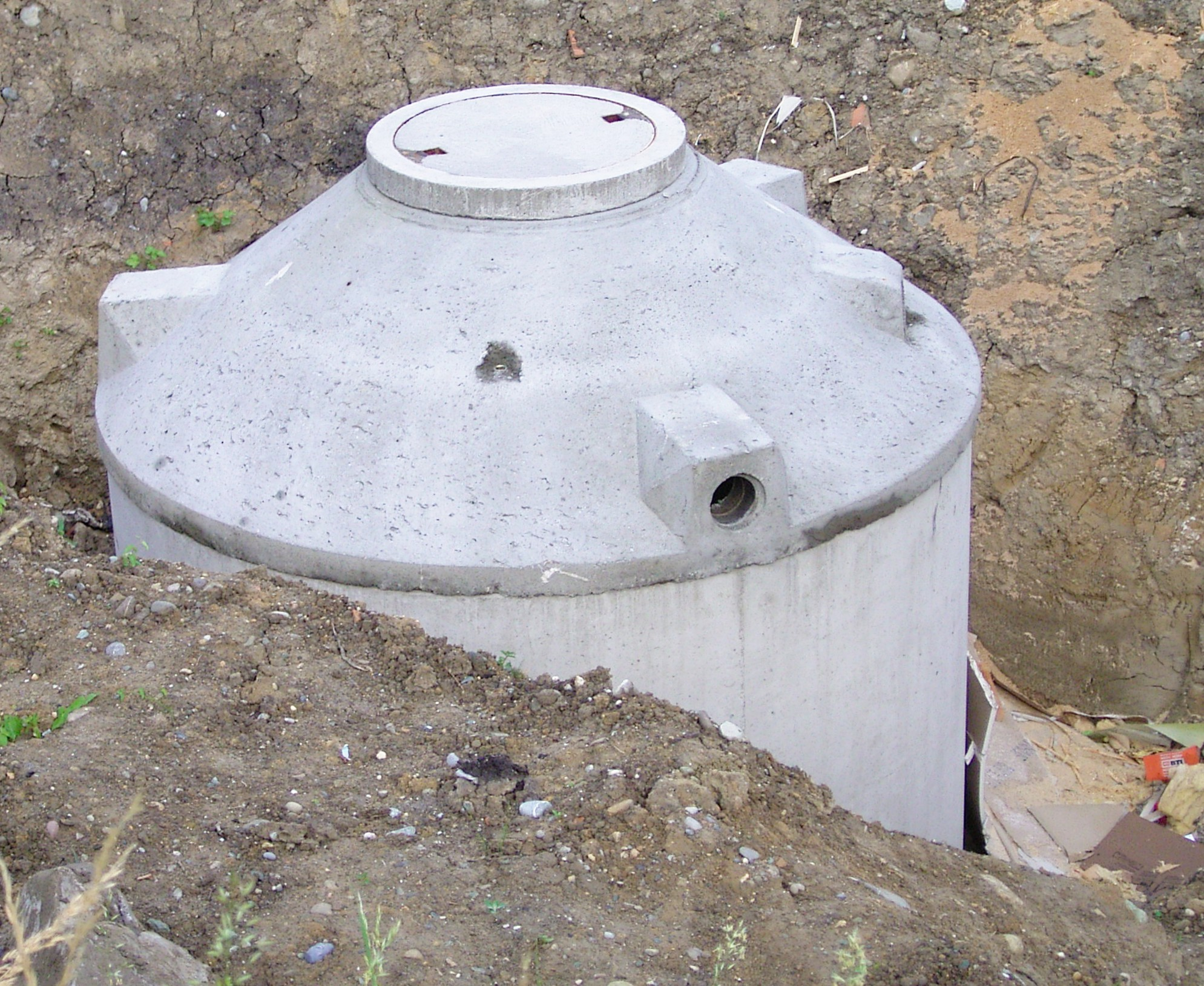
Concrete cistern

Cisterns are commonly prevalent in areas where water is scarce, either because it is rare or has been depleted due to heavy use. Historically, water was used for cooking, irrigation, and washing. Present-day cisterns are often used only for irrigation due to concerns over water quality. Cisterns today can also be fitted with filters or other water purification methods when the water is intended for consumption. It is not uncommon for a cistern to be open in some manner to catch rain or to include more elaborate rainwater harvesting systems. It is important in these cases to have a system that does not leave the water open to algae or to mosquitoes, which are attracted to the water and then potentially carry disease to nearby humans.

One particularly unique modern utilization of cisterns is found in San Francisco, which has historically been subject to devastating fires. As a precautionary measure, in 1850, funds were allocated to construct over 100 cisterns across the city to be utilized in case of fire. The city's firefighting network, the Auxiliary Water Supply System (AWSS) maintains a network of 177 independent underground water cisterns, with sizes varying from 75,000 US gallons (280 kL) to over 200,000 US gallons (760 kL) depending on location, with a total storage capacity of over 11,000,000 US gallons (42 ML). These cisterns are easily spotted at street level with manholes labeled CISTERN S.F.F.D surrounded by red brick circles or rectangles. The cisterns are completely separate from the rest of the city's water supply, ensuring that in the event of an earthquake, additional backup is available regardless of the condition of the city's mainline water system.

Some cisterns sit on the top of houses or on the ground higher than the house, and supply the running water needs for the house. They are often supplied by wells with electric pumps, or are filled manually or by truck delivery, rather than by rainwater collection. Very common throughout Brazil, for example, they were traditionally made of concrete walls (much like the houses themselves), with a similar concrete top (about 5 cm or 2 inches thick), with a piece that can be removed for water filling and then reinserted to keep out debris and insects. Modern cisterns are manufactured out of plastic (in Brazil with a characteristic bright blue color, round, in capacities of 10 to 50 kilolitres (2,600 to 13,200 US gal). These cisterns differ from water tanks in the sense that they are not entirely enclosed and sealed, they have a lid made of the same material as the cistern, which is removable by the user.

To keep a clean water supply, the cistern must be kept clean. It is important to inspect them regularly, keep them well enclosed, and to occasionally empty and clean them with a proper dilution of chlorine and to rinse them well. Well water must be inspected for contaminants coming from the ground source. City water has up to 1ppm (parts per million) chlorine added to the water to keep it clean. If there is any question about the water supply at any point (source to tap), then the cistern water should not be used for drinking or cooking. If it is of acceptable quality and consistency, then it can be used for (1) toilets, and housecleaning; (2) showers and handwashing; (3) washing dishes, with proper sanitation methods, and for the highest quality, (4) cooking and drinking. Water of non-acceptable quality for the aforementioned uses may still be used for irrigation. If it is free of particulates but not low enough in bacteria, then boiling may also be an effective method to prepare the water for drinking.

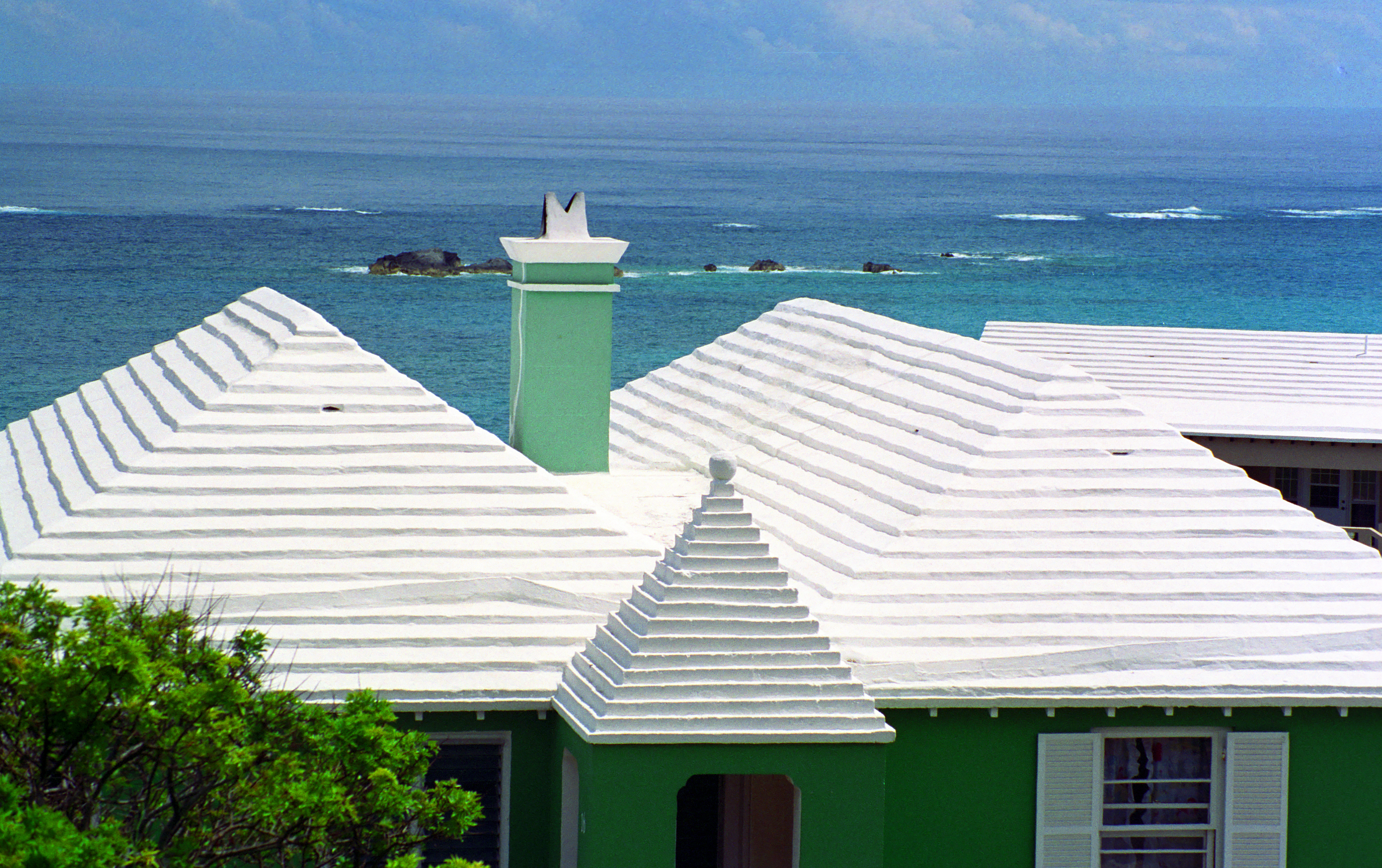
Bermuda's white-stepped roofs for collecting rainwater channeled into cisterns

Many greenhouses rely on a cistern to help meet their water needs, particularly in the United States. Some countries or regions, such as Flanders, Bermuda and the U.S. Virgin Islands, have strict laws requiring rainwater harvesting systems be built with any new construction, and cisterns can be used in these cases. In Bermuda, for example, its familiar white-stepped roofs are part of the rainwater collection system, water is channeled by roof gutters to below-ground cisterns. Other countries, such as Japan, Germany, and Spain, also offer financial incentives or tax credit for installing cisterns. Cisterns may also be used to store water for firefighting in areas where there is an inadequate water supply. The city of San Francisco, notably, maintains fire cisterns under its streets in case the primary water supply is disrupted. In many flat areas, the use of cisterns is encouraged to absorb excess rainwater which otherwise can overload sewage or drainage systems by heavy rains (certainly in urban areas where a lot of ground is surfaced and doesn't let the ground absorb water).

== Bathing ==
In some southeast Asian countries such as Malaysia and Indonesia showers are traditionally taken by pouring water over one's body with a dipper (this practice comes from before piped water was common). Many bathrooms even in modern houses are constructed with a small cistern to hold water for bathing by this method.

== Toilet cisterns ==
A traditional gravity toilet tank concluding the flush cycle.: 1. float, 2. fill valve, 3. lift arm, 4. tank fill tube, 5. bowl fill tube, 6. flush valve flapper, 7. overflow tube, 8. flush handle, 9. chain, 10. fill line, 11. fill valve shaft, 12. flush tube

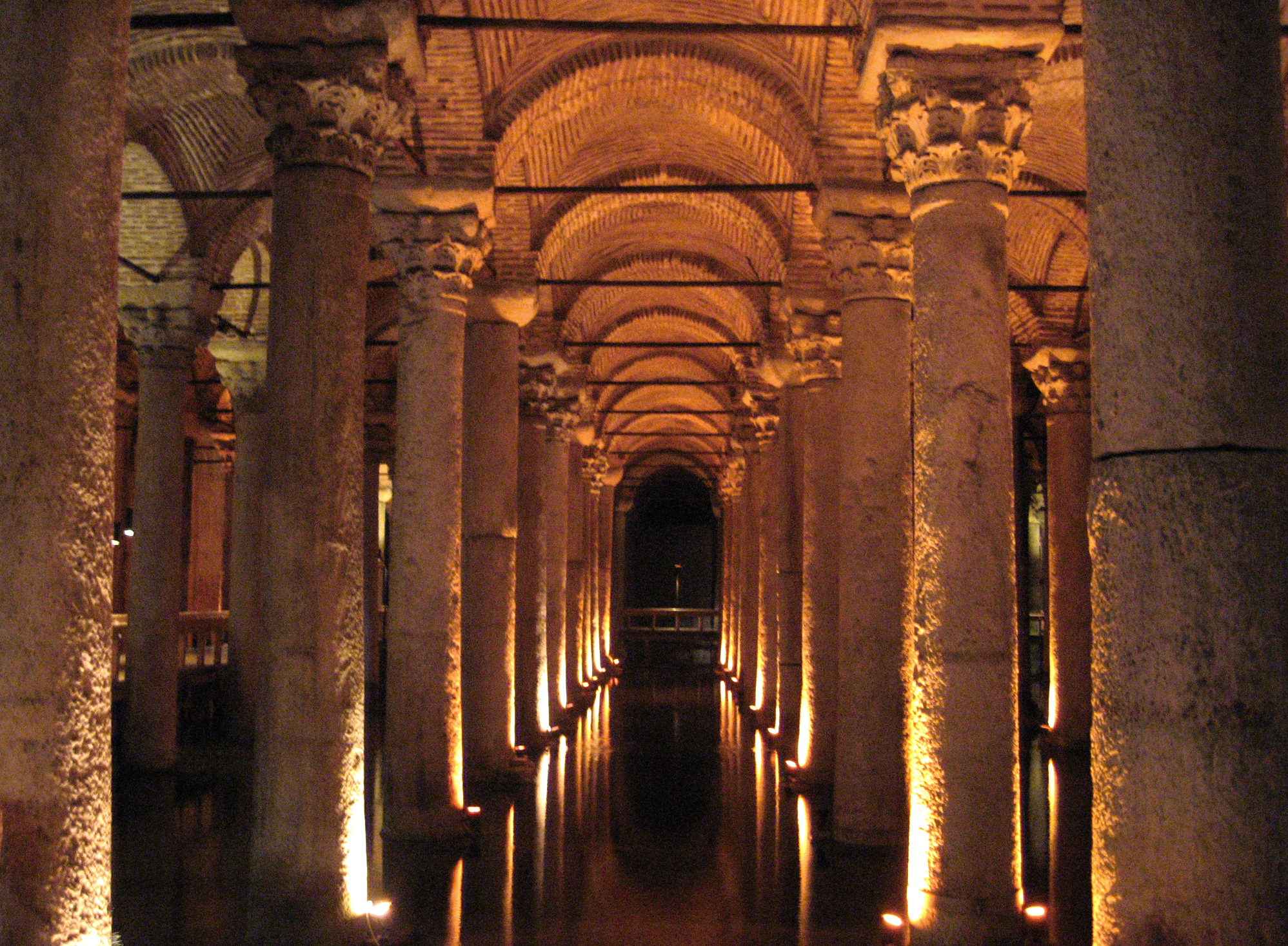
Basilica Cistern, Istanbul, 138 x 65 meter, 80,000 m^{3}; Justinian I

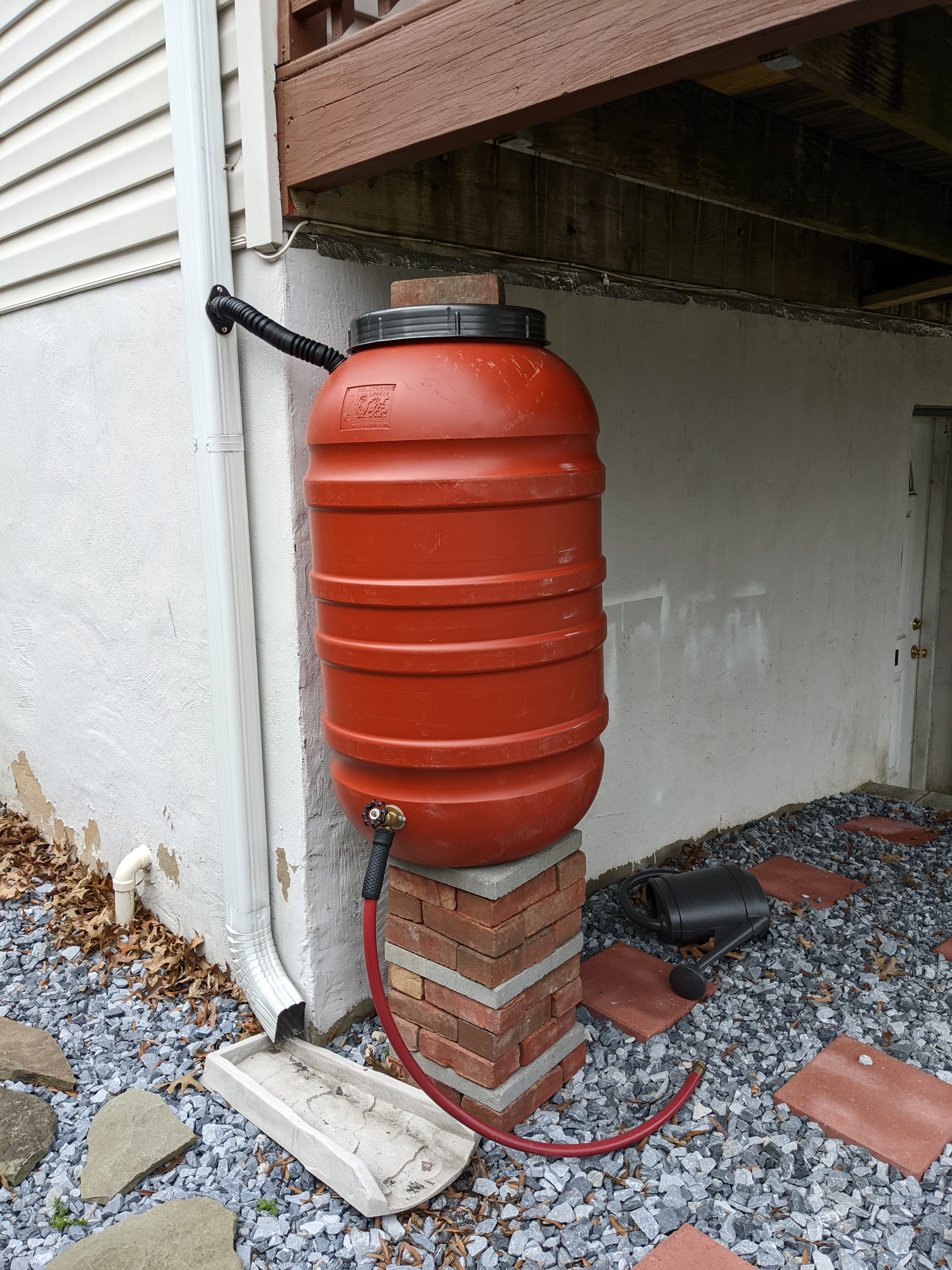
A rain barrel is a form of small cistern

The modern toilet utilises a cistern to reserve and hold the correct amount of water required to flush the toilet bowl. In earlier toilets, the cistern was located high above the toilet bowl and connected to it by a long pipe. It was necessary to pull a hanging chain connected to a release valve located inside the cistern in order to flush the toilet. Modern toilets may be close coupled, with the cistern mounted directly on the toilet bowl and no intermediate pipe. In this arrangement, the flush mechanism (lever or push button) is usually mounted on the cistern. Concealed cistern toilets, where the cistern is built into the wall behind the toilet, are also available. A flushing trough is a type of cistern used to serve more than one WC pan at one time. These cisterns are becoming less common, however. The cistern was the genesis of the modern bidet.

At the beginning of the flush cycle, as the water level in the toilet cistern tank drops, the flush valve flapper falls back to the bottom, stopping the main flow to the flush tube. Because the tank water level has yet to reach the fill line, water continues to flow from the tank and bowl fill tubes. When the water again reaches the fill line, the float will release the fill valve shaft and water flow will stop.

== One Million Cisterns Program ==
In Northeastern Brazil, the One Million Cisterns Program (Programa 1 Milhão de Cisternas or P1MC) has assisted local people with water management. The Brazilian government adopted this new policy of rainwater harvesting in 2013. The Semi-Arid Articulation (ASA) has been providing managerial and technological support to establish cement-layered containers, called cisterns, to harvest and store rainwater for small farm-holders in 34 territories of nine states where ASA operates (Minas Gerais, Bahia, Sergipe, Alagoas, Pernambuco, Paraíba, Rio Grande do Norte, Ceará and Piauí).

The rainwater falling on the rooftops is directed through pipelines or gutters and stored in the cistern. The cistern is covered with a lid to avoid evaporation. Each cistern has a capacity of 16,000 liters. Water collected in it during 3–4 months of the rainy season can sustain the requirement for drinking, cooking, and other basic sanitation purposes for rest of the dry periods. By 2016, 1.2 million rainwater harvesting cisterns were implemented for human consumption alone. After positive results of P1MC, the government introduced another program named "One Land, Two Water Program" (Uma Terra, Duas Águas, P1 + 2), which provides a farmer with another slab cistern to support agricultural production.

== Notable examples ==
- Basilica Cistern in Istanbul, Turkey
- Aljibe of the Palacio de las Veletas in Cáceres, Spain
- Portuguese cistern (Mazagan) in El Jadida, Morocco
- Cistern in Silves, Portugal
- Matera, southern Italy
- Asa of Judah built a cistern. The prophet Jeremiah was later thrown in it after prophesying the Babylonian invasion
- Cistern in Genesis 37:20, 22

== Gallery ==
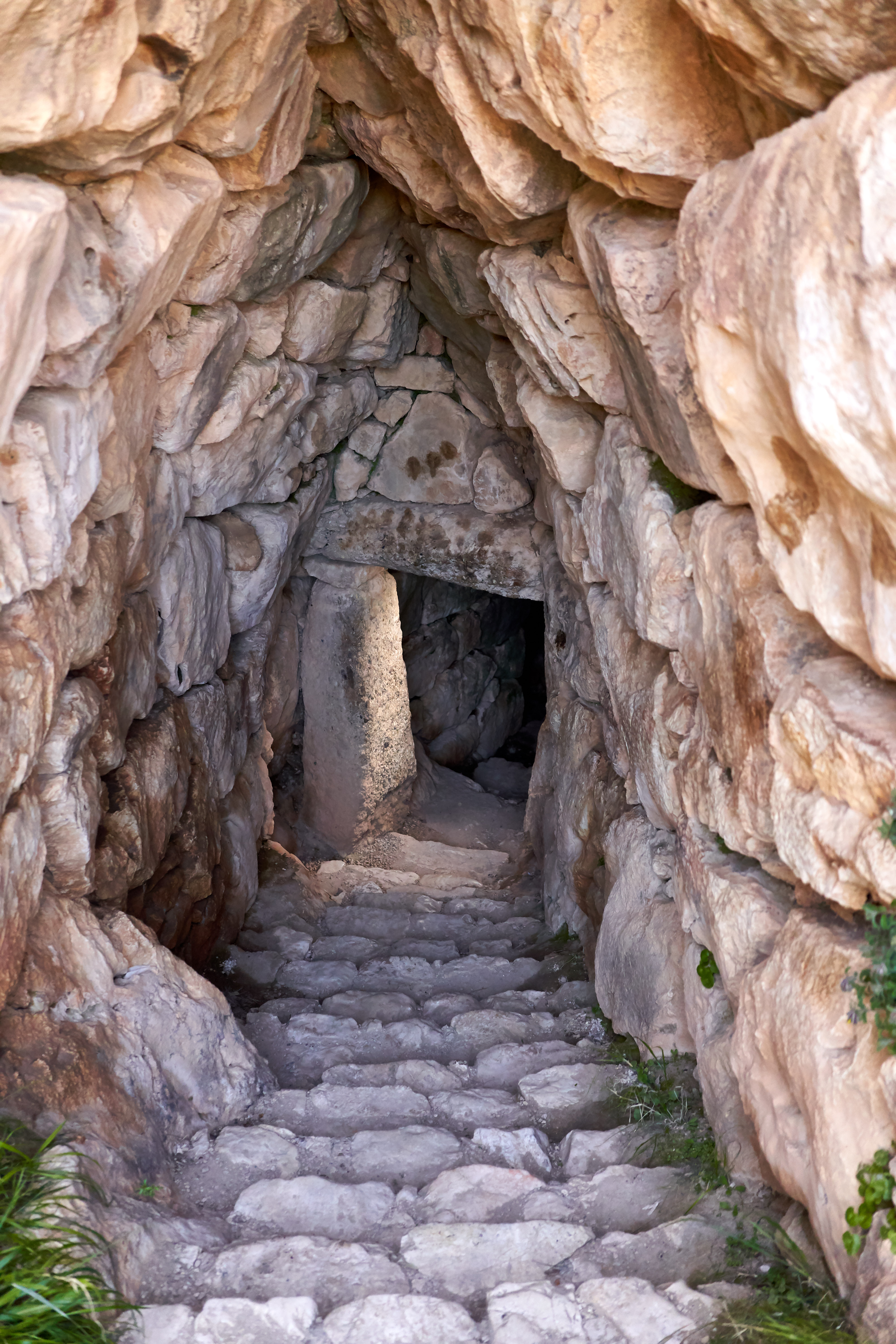
Staircase leading to the lower levels of the underground cistern of Mycenae, Argolis,
13th cent. B.C.

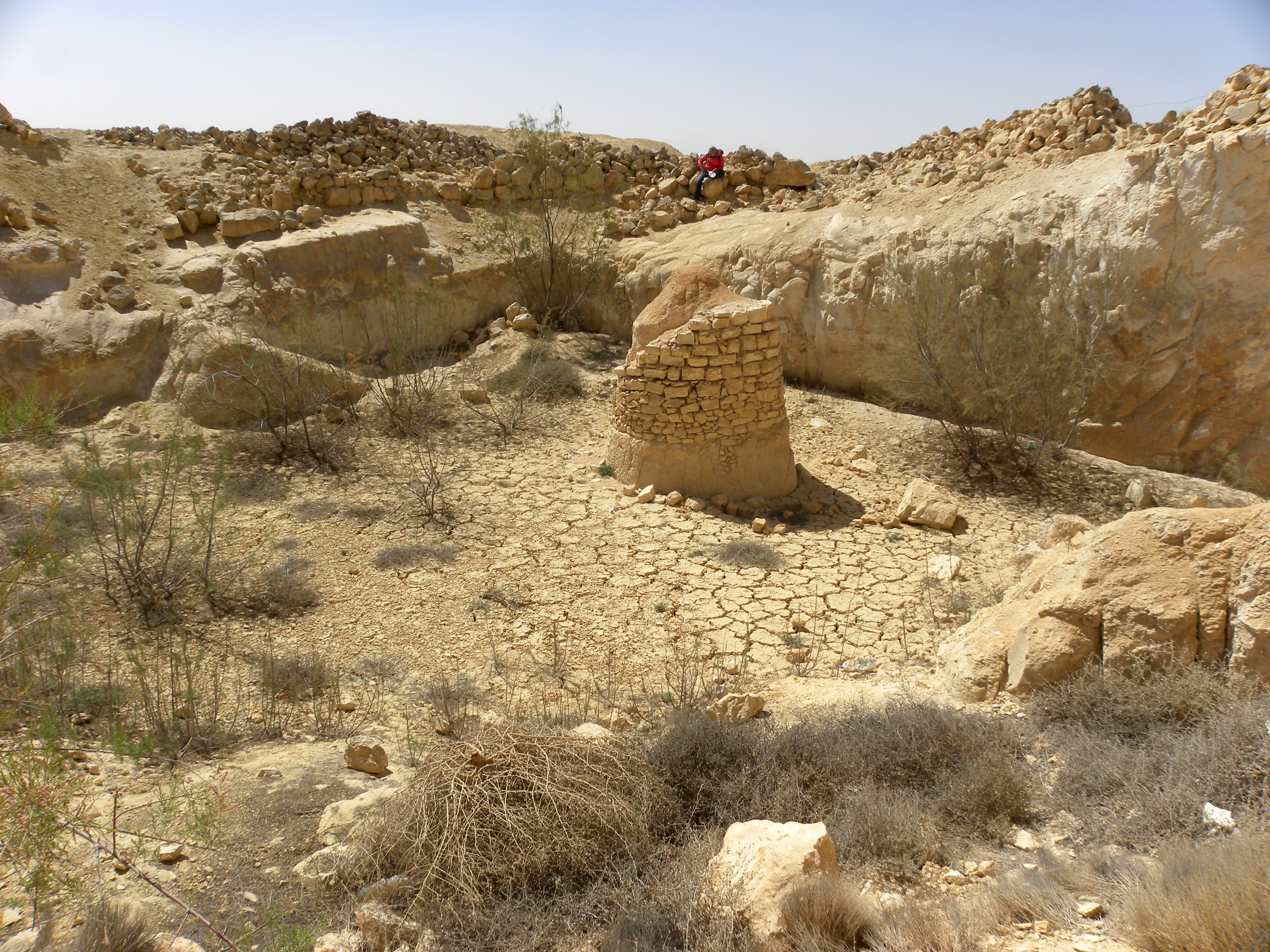
Remains of a Nabataean cistern north of Makhtesh Ramon, southern Israel

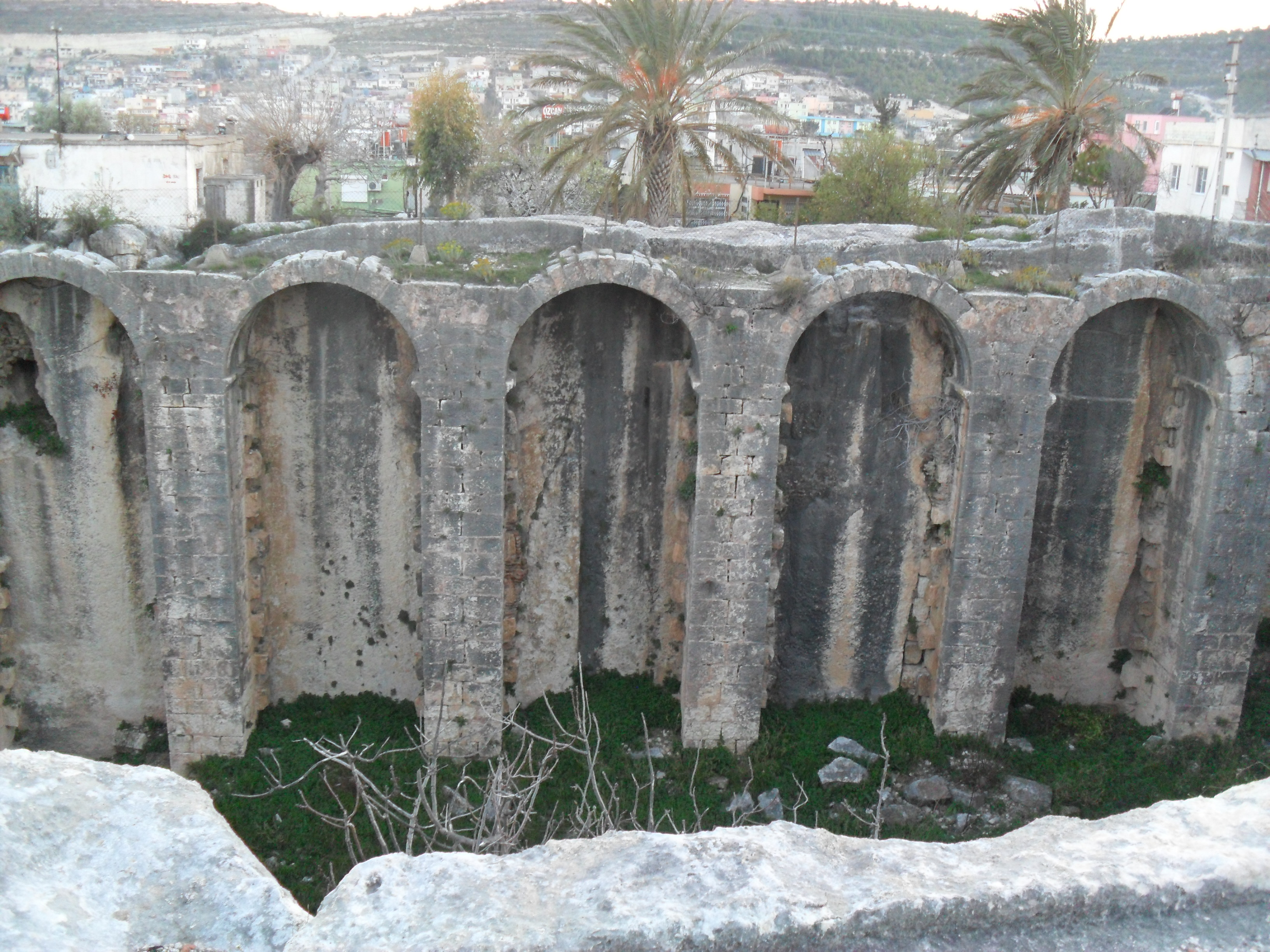
Cistern known as Tekir ambarı in Silifke, Mersin Province, Turkey

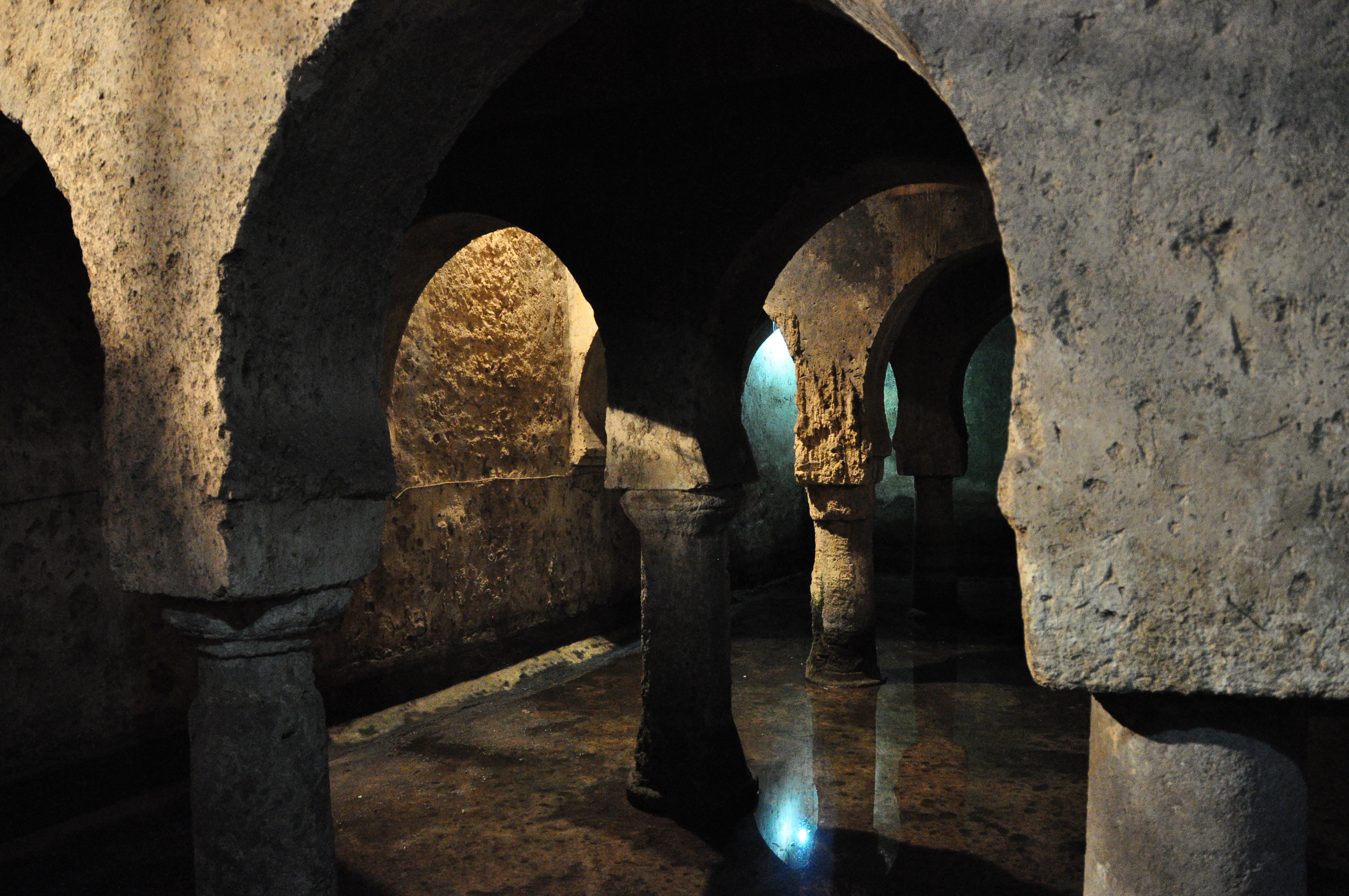
Aljibe of the Palacio de las Veletas, Cáceres, Spain

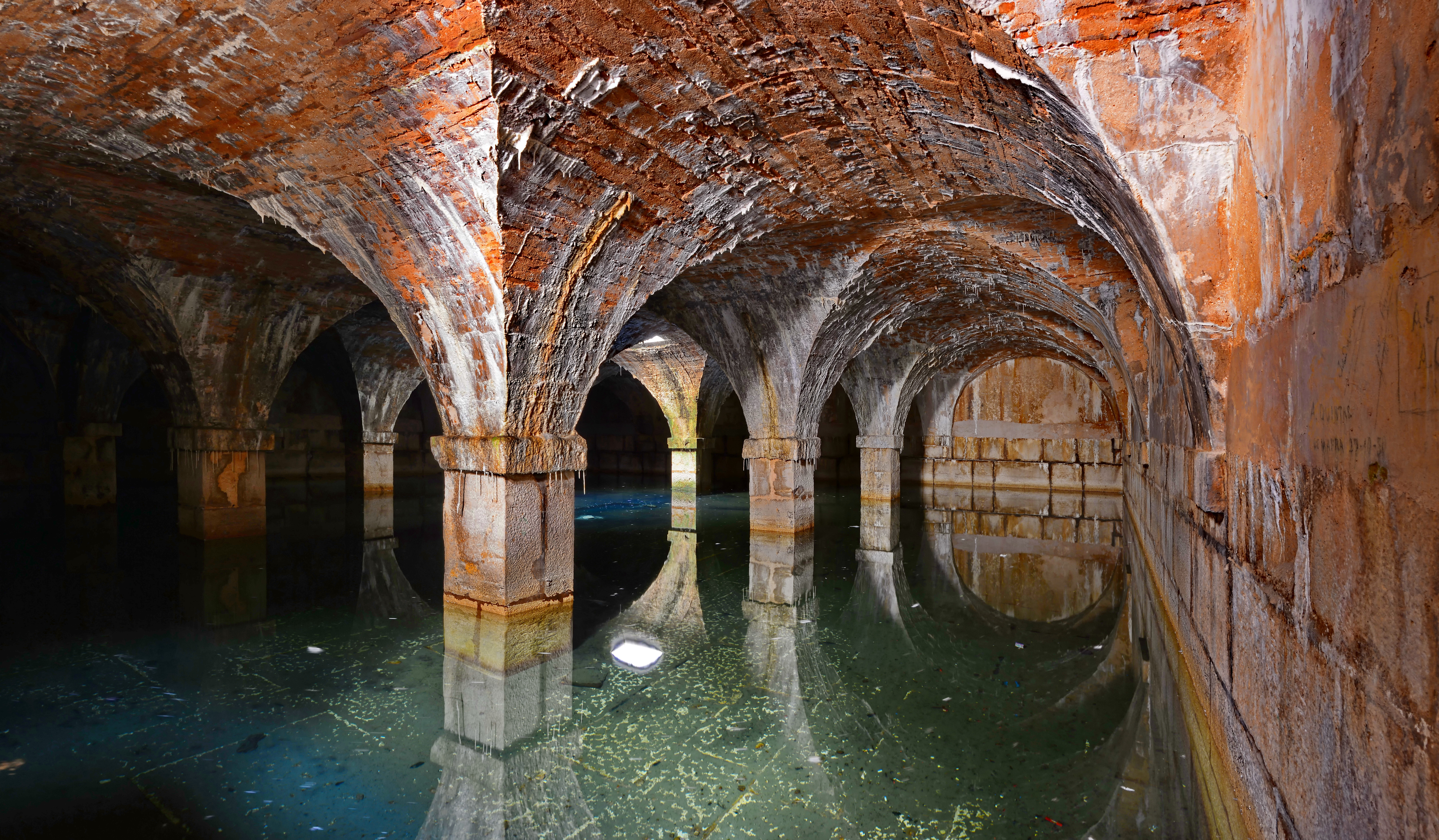
Cistern in the Peniche Fortress, Peniche, Portugal

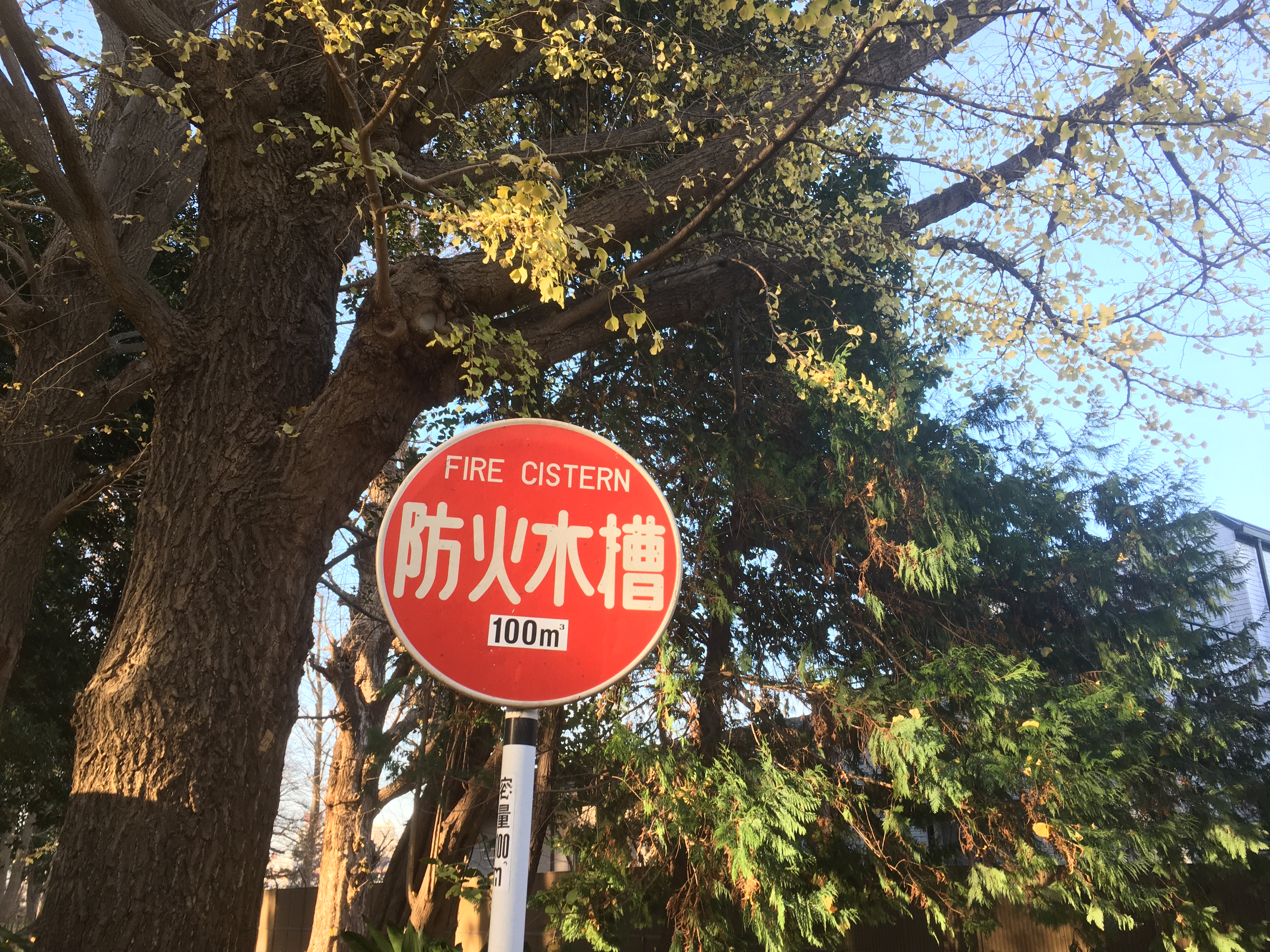
Sign indicating a cistern in Japan

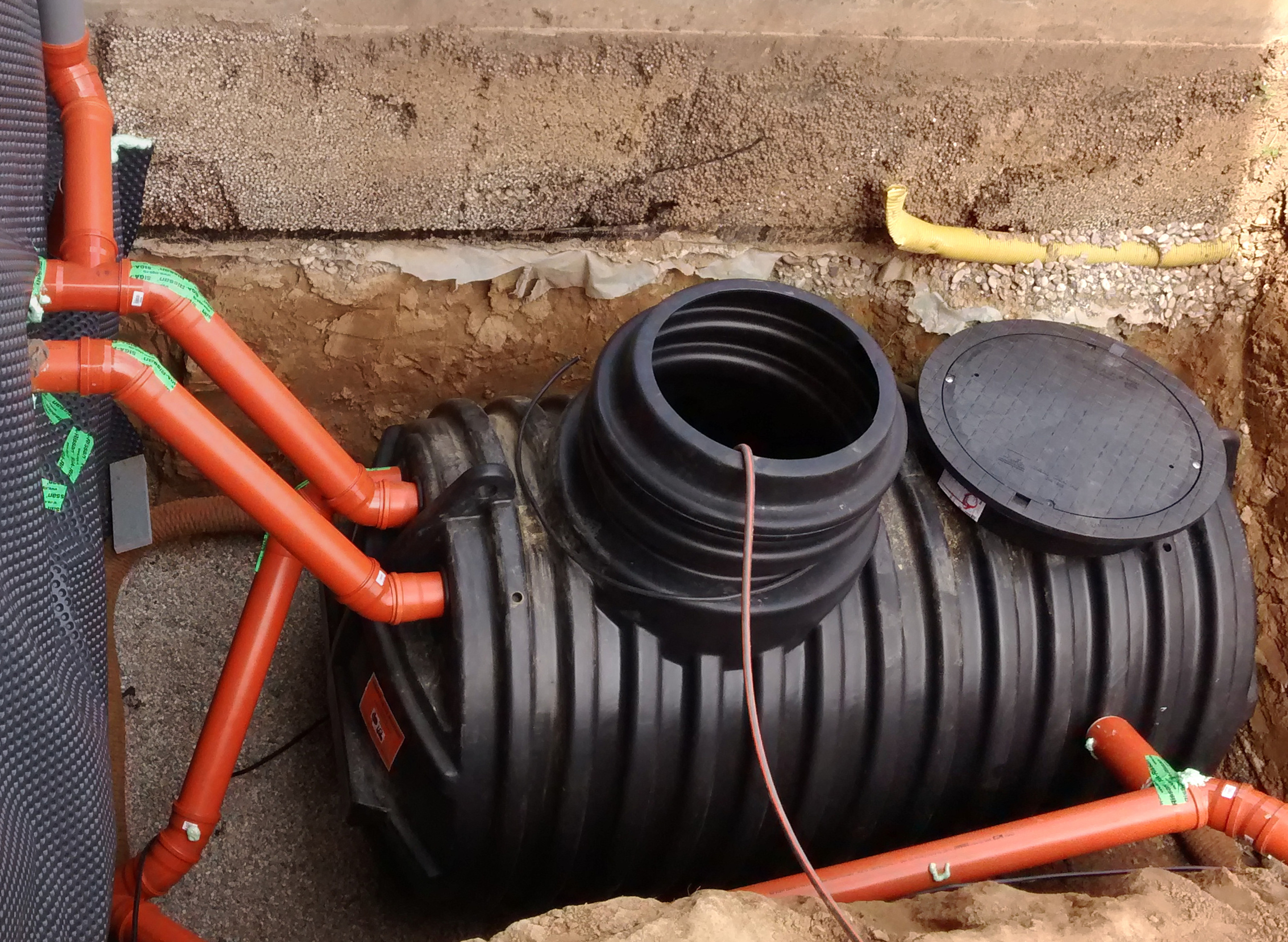
Plastic cistern

== See also ==
- History of water supply and sanitation
- Ancient water conservation techniques
- List of Roman cisterns
