= Milwaukee Fire Department High Pressure Pumping Station =

- Formerly listed on the U.S. National Register of Historic Places
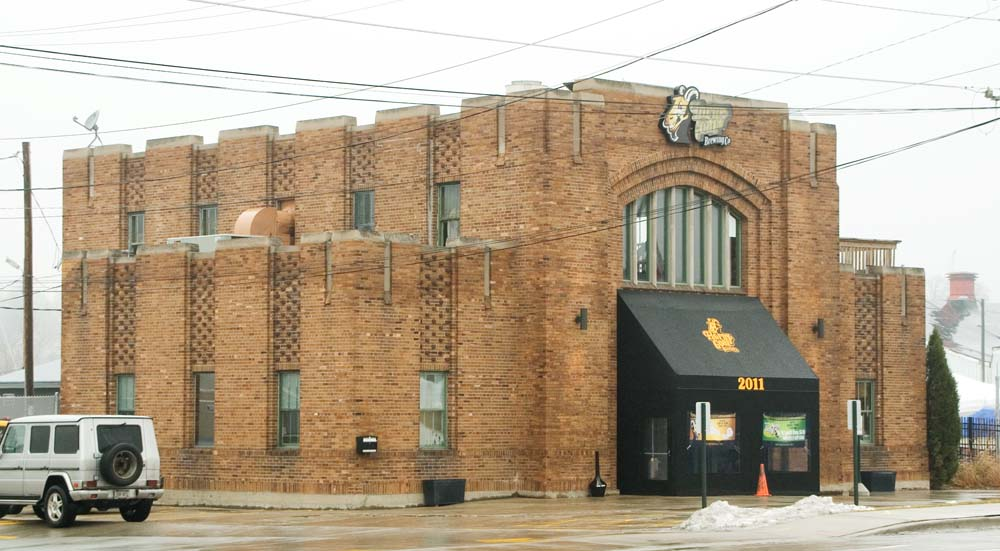

- Location within Wisconsin
- Location: 2011 S. 1st St., Milwaukee, Wisconsin
- Coordinates: 43°00′21″N 87°54′41″W
- Area: less than one acre
- Built: 1931
- Architect: Milwaukee's Water Engineering Division
- Architectural style: Late Gothic Revival, Perpendicular English Style
- Demolished: 2018
- NRHP reference No.: 81000049

Significant dates
- Added to NRHP: July 7, 1981
- Removed from NRHP: December 18, 2024

The Milwaukee Fire Department High Pressure Pumping Station, at 2011 South 1st Street in Milwaukee, Wisconsin, was built in 1931. It has also been known as the Kinnickinnic River Pumping Station. It was listed on the National Register of Historic Places in 1981 and the building was demolished in 2018. It was delisted in 2024.

== History ==
The building was built to replace the function of Milwaukee Fire Department Fireboat No. 17 in the area around the pumping station, which was an area of heavy industry and where streets, railway tracks, bridges and the Kinnickinnic River crossed multiple times. It provided assurance that high pressure water could be supplied to fight fires in the area, and required a six-man crew rather than the 16-man crew required to man the fireboat. The station's 600 h.p. Allis-Chalmers three-stage centrifugal M-i type pumps delivered water at pressures on the order of 475 pounds per square inch through special mains 12 to 20 inches in diameter, as compared to a conventional city water system which delivers no more than 80 pounds per square inch and then requires pumps on fire trucks to shoot the water high onto buildings. This was the only such station built in Milwaukee.

As the city water system improved and the Great Depression weakened industry in the area, the need for the special station decreased and it was closed in 1950.

== Demolishment ==
Horny Goat Brewing Company had operated a brewpub in the building from 2009 until 2015 when they listed the property for sale. Michels Corporation acquired the site for $3.6 million in April 2017. Michels applied to demolish the building one year later in April 2018. The company and City of Milwaukee officials announced a $100 million Harbor District development for the six-acre site. Because the building was not locally designated as a historic structure, no hearing was required before the Historic Preservation Commission.

== See also ==
- Milwaukee Fire Department
- List of fire department specialty facilities
