= Alonzo Robinson Jr. =

American architect (born 1923)

- Born: March 5, 1923
- Died: June 26, 2000 (aged 77)
- Occupation: Architect

Alonzo Robinson Jr. (March 5, 1923 – June 26, 2000) was an American architect. Wisconsin’s first registered Black architect, his career spanned over four decades and he designed numerous offices, churches, and other spaces in greater Milwaukee.

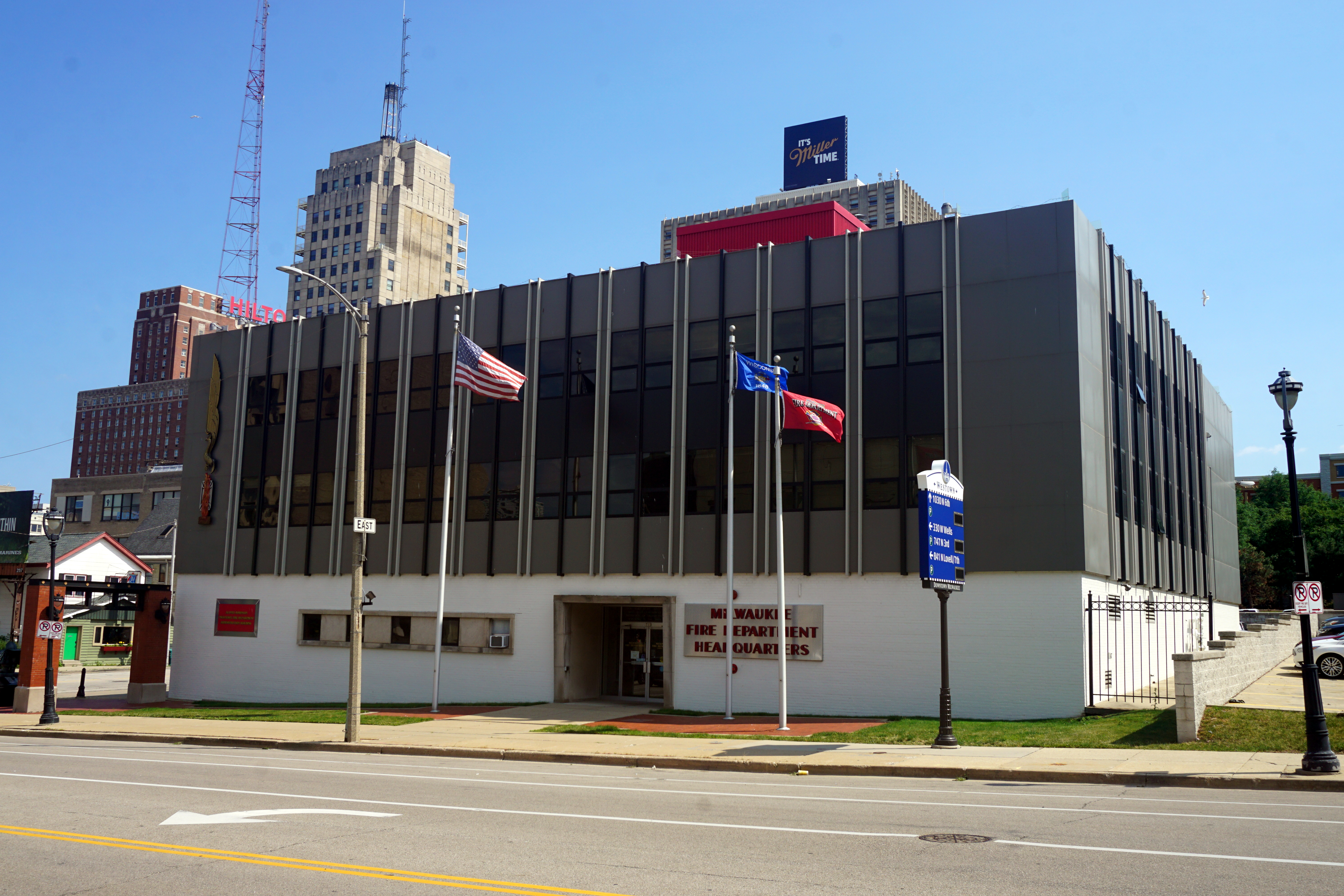
The Milwaukee Fire Department Headquarters in Milwaukee, Wisconsin.

== Biography ==
Robinson grew up in Delaware. He graduated from Howard University in Washington, DC. In 1954, he was hired by the City of Milwaukee. He later worked for Milwaukee County and also established his own architectural firm. During 40 years of work, he designed over 100 buildings ranging from large-scale public buildings and churches, to beauty salons, daycare centres and restaurants.

Notable projects he designed were the Kosciuszko Park Community Center, Mr. Perkins Restaurant at Atkinson Drive and North 20th St, and the downtown Milwaukee Fire Department headquarters at 7th and Wells, which was renamed in 2021 to honor him as designer of the building. Additionally, he designed the Central City Plaza, which was completed in 1973, and was the first Black-developed, Black-owned, and Black-operated mixed-use commercial development in Wisconsin. Robinson also served as architect of record for Mahalia Jackson’s Chicken System restaurant in Milwaukee, 1970.
