= Fire Department Headquarters–Fire Alarm Headquarters =

Building in Washington, D.C.

- U.S. National Register of Historic Places
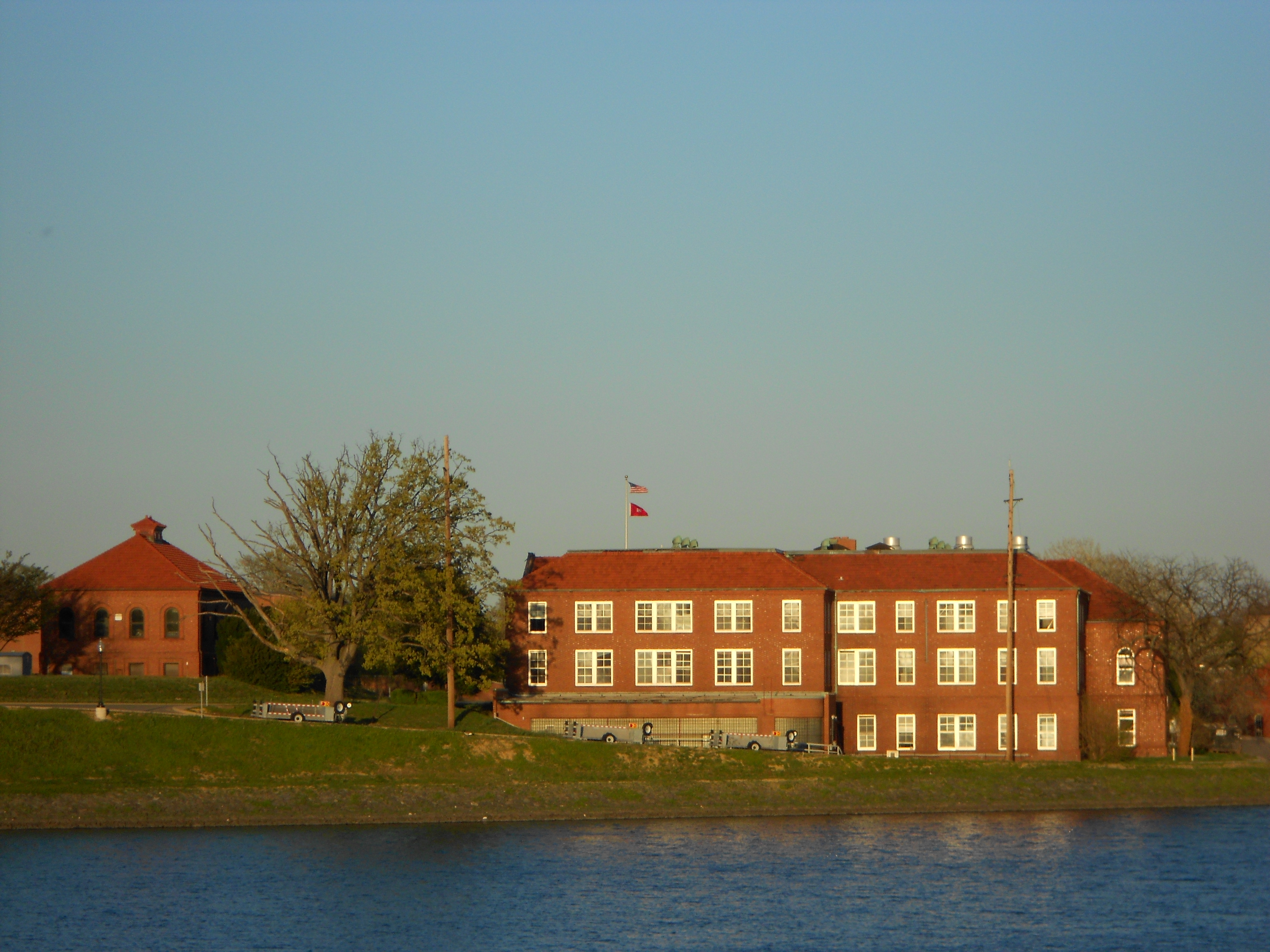
- Fire Department Headquarters-Fire Alarm Headquarters in 2012

- Location within District of Columbia
- Location: 300 McMillan Dr., NW. Washington, D.C.
- Coordinates: 38°55′24″N 77°0′47″W
- Built: 1939
- Architect: Nathan C. Wyeth
- MPS: Firehouses in Washington DC MPS
- NRHP reference No.: 11000286
- Added to NRHP: May 18, 2011

The Fire Department Headquarters–Fire Alarm Headquarters is an historic structure located in the Bloomingdale neighborhood in Washington, D.C. It was listed on both the District of Columbia Inventory of Historic Sites and on the National Register of Historic Places in 2011. The building was designed by Nathan C. Wyeth and built in 1939 along the McMillan Reservoir.
