= Fire Alarm, Telegraph and Police Signaling Building =

- U.S. National Register of Historic Places
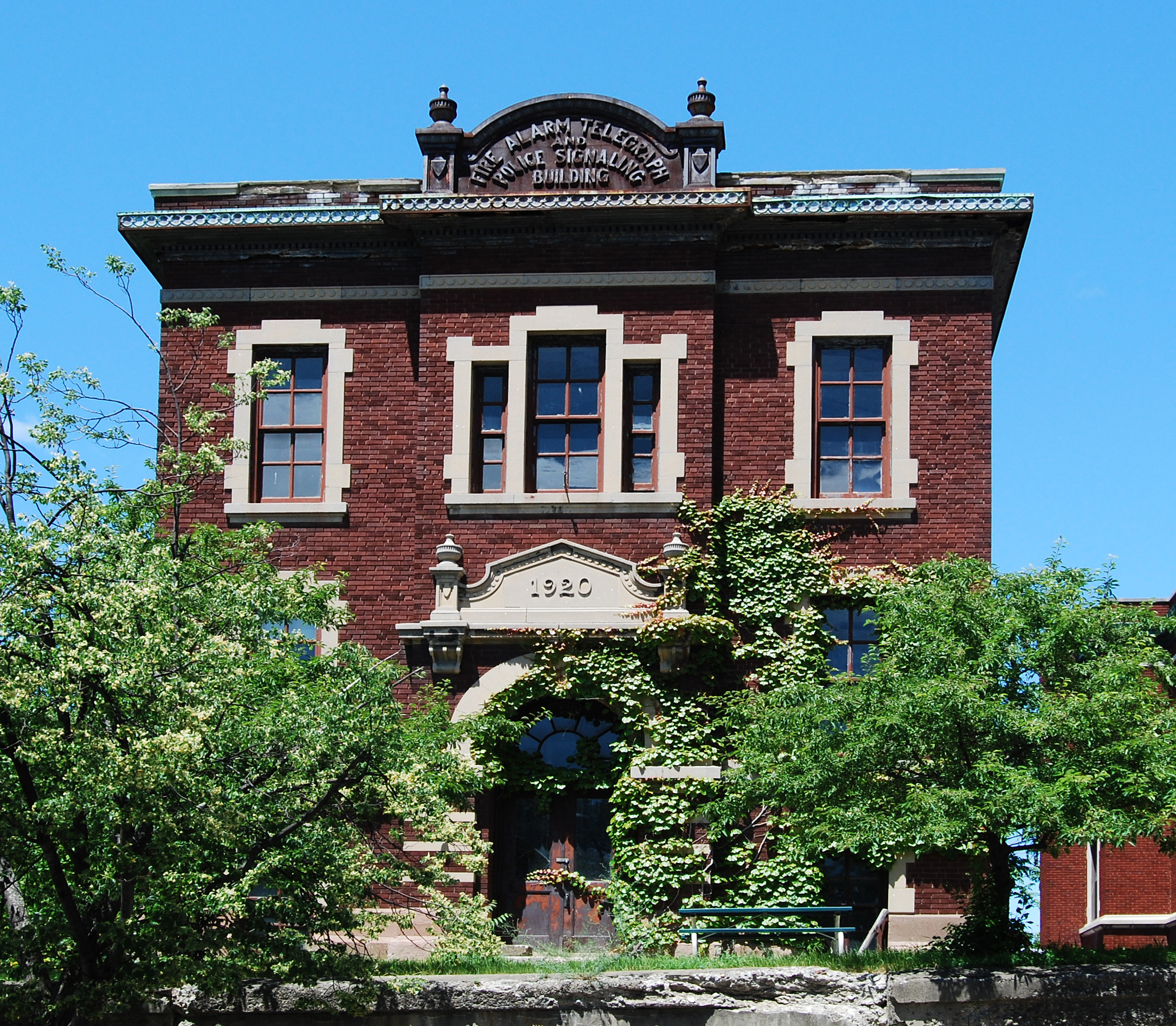
- South elevation, 2009

- Location within New York Location within the United States
- Location: Troy, NY
- Coordinates: 42°43′46″N 73°41′09″W
- Built: 1920-22
- NRHP reference No.: 02001714
- Added to NRHP: 2003

The Fire Alarm, Telegraph and Police Signaling Building, usually referred to just as the Signaling Building, was located at 67 State Street in Troy, New York, United States. After years of use as storage space by Rensselaer County, the building was demolished in 2022.

It was originally built to implement a new combined fire and police "silent alarm" system in the early 1920s, using telephone wires instead of human bell-ringers. This represented the last step in Troy's efforts to prevent the devastating fires of the 19th century from destroying so much of the city again. It continued to be used for that purpose until 1968, and in 2003 it was listed on the National Register of Historic Places.
