= Fireboats of Milwaukee =

As a significant Great Lakes port there has been a need for fireboats in Milwaukee.

Fireboats in Milwaukee
image	name	entered service	retired	notes
	Cataract	1889	1903	
	Fireboat 17	1893	1930	Previously named James Foley.
	Fireboat 23	1897	1922	
	Fireboat 15	1903	1952	
	Fireboat 29	1906	1948	
	Torrent	1922	1949	Presviously served a private railroad in Two Harbors, Minnesota
	Deluge	1949	1984	
	Roamer	1963	1984	Initially powered by waterjets, her propulsion had to be converted to conventional propellers.
	Fireboat 1	1984	1993	This was a military surplus amphibious truck
	Fireboat 1	2007		Metalcraft Marine 36' fireboat
