= Dennis T. Sullivan =

American firefighter

Dennis Thomas Sullivan
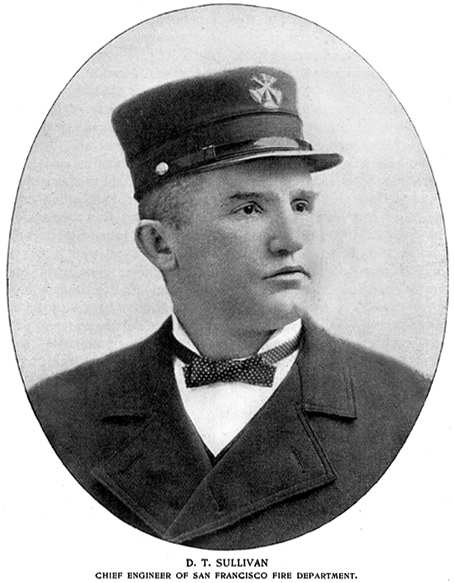
- Born: November 2, 1852; Florence, New York
- Died: April 22, 1906 (aged 53); San Francisco
- Occupation: Fire Chief Engineer
- Known for: Killed by the 1906 San Francisco earthquake

Dennis T. Sullivan (1852–1906) was the Chief of the San Francisco Fire Department in 1906. He was mortally wounded during the 1906 San Francisco earthquake, when a neighboring building collapsed onto the fire station that housed the Chief's official apartment.

Sullivan grew up in Utica, New York, and moved to San Francisco in the late 1870s. He was a blacksmith when he joined the Fire Department at 25 years old. He was appointed the Department's Chief upon the death in office of his predecessor, David S. Scannell.

In 1903 Sullivan proposed an emergency water supply system for the fire department to use water from one or more reservoirs to be constructed on the city's high peaks. Construction began in 1909, three years after the quake. Called the San Francisco Auxiliary Water Supply System (AWSS), it remains the backbone of the city's emergency water supply. Its construction was completed in 1913.

Sullivan was mortally injured by the 1906 earthquake when an adjacent building collapsed onto his firehouse residence. His wife Margaret survived her injuries.

== Legacy ==
In 1909 the city launched the fireboat Dennis T. Sullivan. When San Francisco built a new residence for its Fire Chiefs it was named after Sullivan. There is also an Irish pub in north beach area in San Francisco that is named Chief Sullivan's in honor of him. The Memorial Home of Fire Chief Dennis T. Sullivan, built in 1922, stands at 870 Bush Street.
