= Marsden Manson =

Civil engineer

Marsden Manson ( February 14, 1850, 1850 – February 21, 1931) was an American civil engineer.

Manson was born in Virginia. He received a bachelor of science and civil engineering degrees in 1873 at the Virginia Military Institute and received his Ph.D. in engineering at University of California in 1893. Manson worked as a civil engineer for several institutions in California, in particular in the San Francisco area. He died in Berkeley.

== Books and publications ==
- "The Evolution of Climate", 1922
