= San Francisco Fire Department Auxiliary Water Supply System =

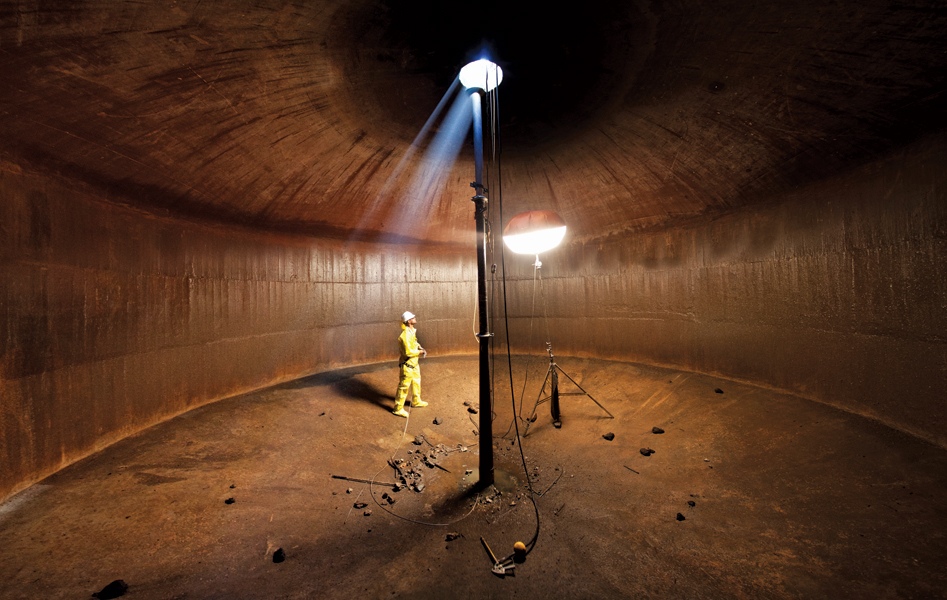
Cistern in the Mission District, San Francisco, California

The Auxiliary Water Supply System (AWSS, though often referred to on manhole covers and hydrants as HPFS for High Pressure Fire System) is a high pressure water supply network built for the city of San Francisco in response to the failure of the existing emergency water system during the 1906 earthquake. Most damages to the city from the earthquake were caused not by the seismic event but by the fires that ensued, destroying 80% of the city's property value at the time. The improved water system was originally proposed by San Francisco Fire Department chief engineer Dennis T. Sullivan in 1903, with construction beginning in 1909 and finishing in 1913. The system comprises a collection of water reservoirs, pump stations, cisterns, suction connections and fireboats. While the system can use fresh or salt water, it is preferential not to use salt water, as it commonly causes galvanic corrosion in fire equipment.

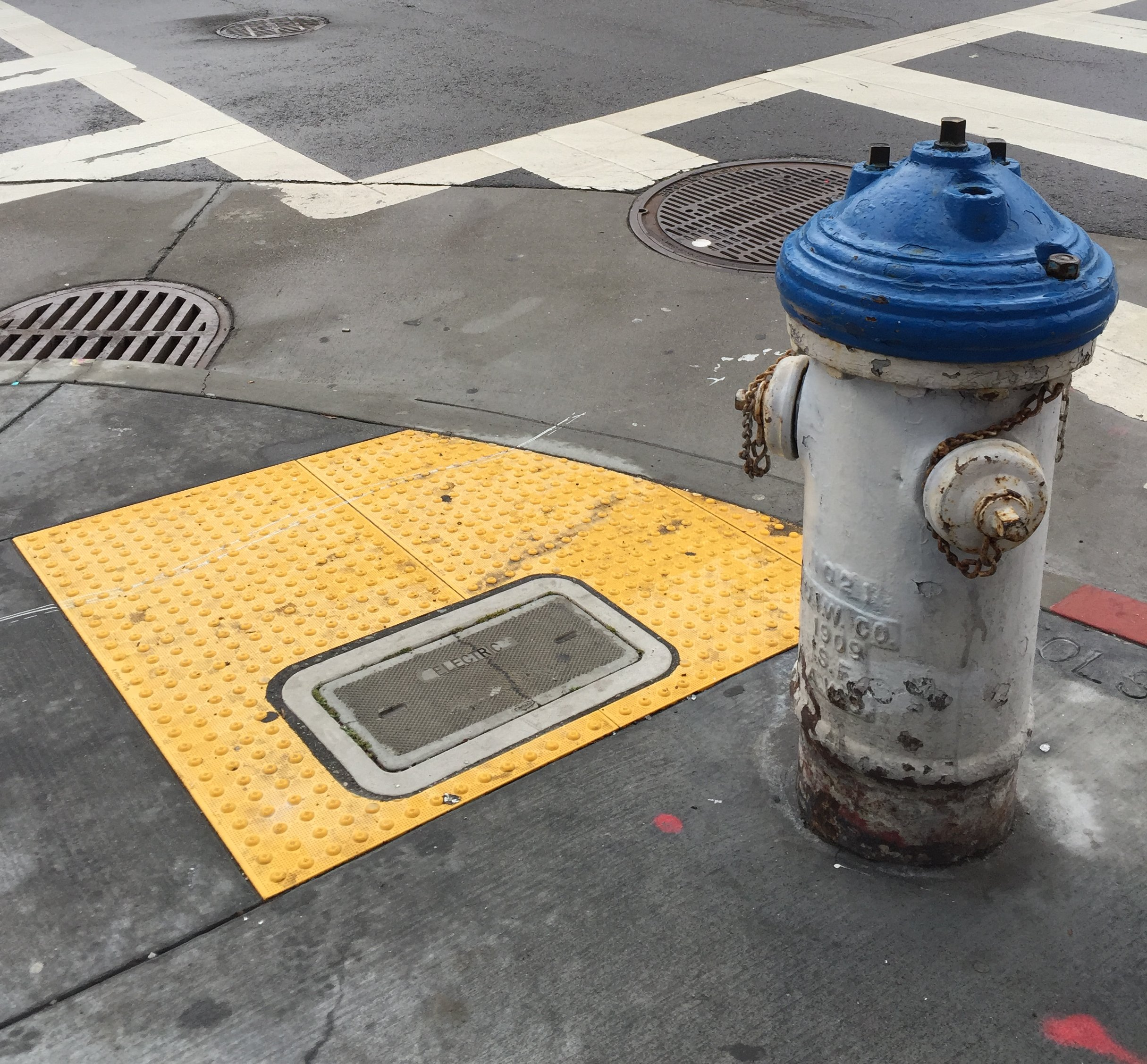
Blue-topped AWSS fire hydrant in the Mission district of San Francisco.

The large, white oversized hydrants that are supplied by the AWSS/HPFS, of which there are 1,889, are visible throughout the city. The hydrants have painted tops that are color-coded as to their zone:

- Black-topped hydrants are in the West of Twin Peaks zone and are fed by the Twin Peaks Reservoir.
- Red-topped hydrants are in the upper zone and are fed by the Ashbury Street tank.
- Blue-topped hydrants are in the lower zone and are fed by the Jones Street tank.

== Upper zone ==
=== Reservoirs ===
==== Twin Peaks Reservoir ====
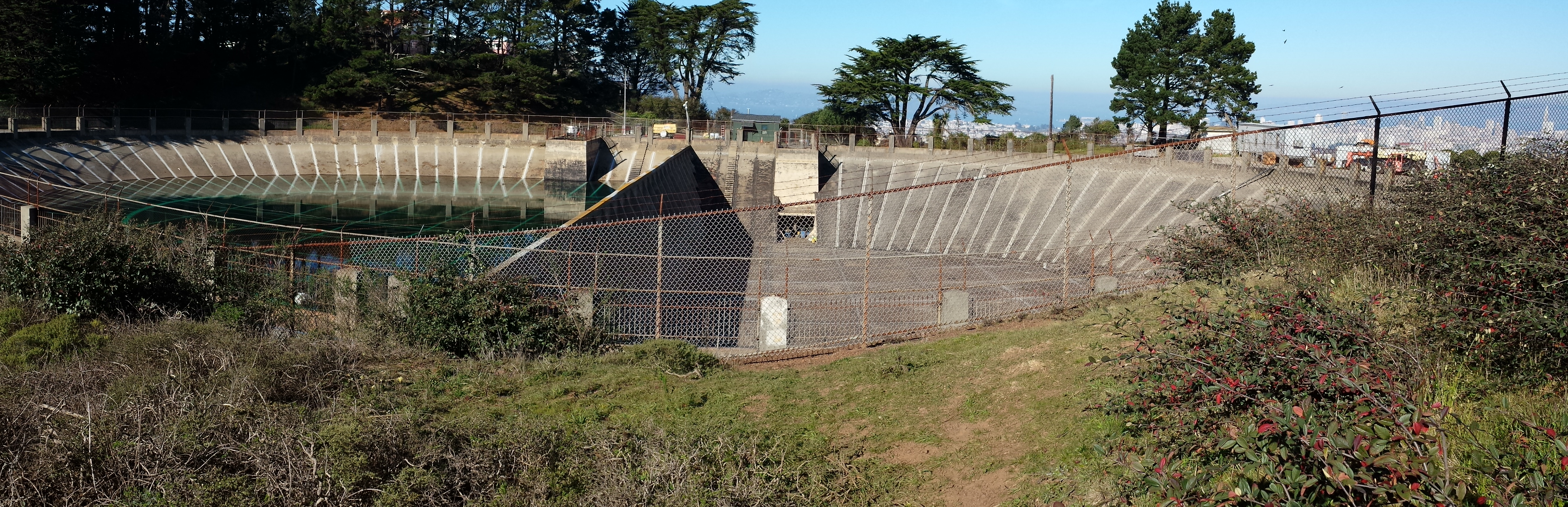
Twin Peaks Reservoir, at near-empty level.

The Twin Peaks Reservoir is the backbone of the AWSS system and is located at the top of San Francisco's Twin Peaks hilltop. It is made up of a 10.5-million-U.S.-gallon (40-million-liter) storage reservoir made out of 6-inch-thick (150 mm) reinforced-concrete slabs. Two 750-US-gallon-per-minute (2,800 L/min) centrifugal pumps deliver fresh water from the city's domestic water system. For safety, the reservoir is broken up into two tanks, and each tank can be emptied separately so that only half of the reservoir is lost in case of a pipe breakage. The tank is set at 758 feet (231 m).

==== Ashbury tank ====
The Ashbury tank is directly connected to the Twin Peaks reservoir and has a total capacity of 500,000 US gallons (1,900,000 L). The tank is set at 494 feet (151 m) and, when combined with the Jones Street tank, can provide hydrants with 214 pounds per square inch (1,480 kPa) of pressure. It is located at 1234 Clayton Street, in the city's Ashbury Heights neighborhood.

==== Jones Street tank ====
The Jones Street tank is directly connected to the Ashbury tank and has a total capacity of 750,000 US gallons (2,800,000 L). The tank is set at 369 feet (112 m), providing hydrants with 160 pounds per square inch (1,100 kPa) of pressure. It is located at 1239 Jones Street in the city's Nob Hill neighborhood.

== Lower zone ==
=== Pump stations ===
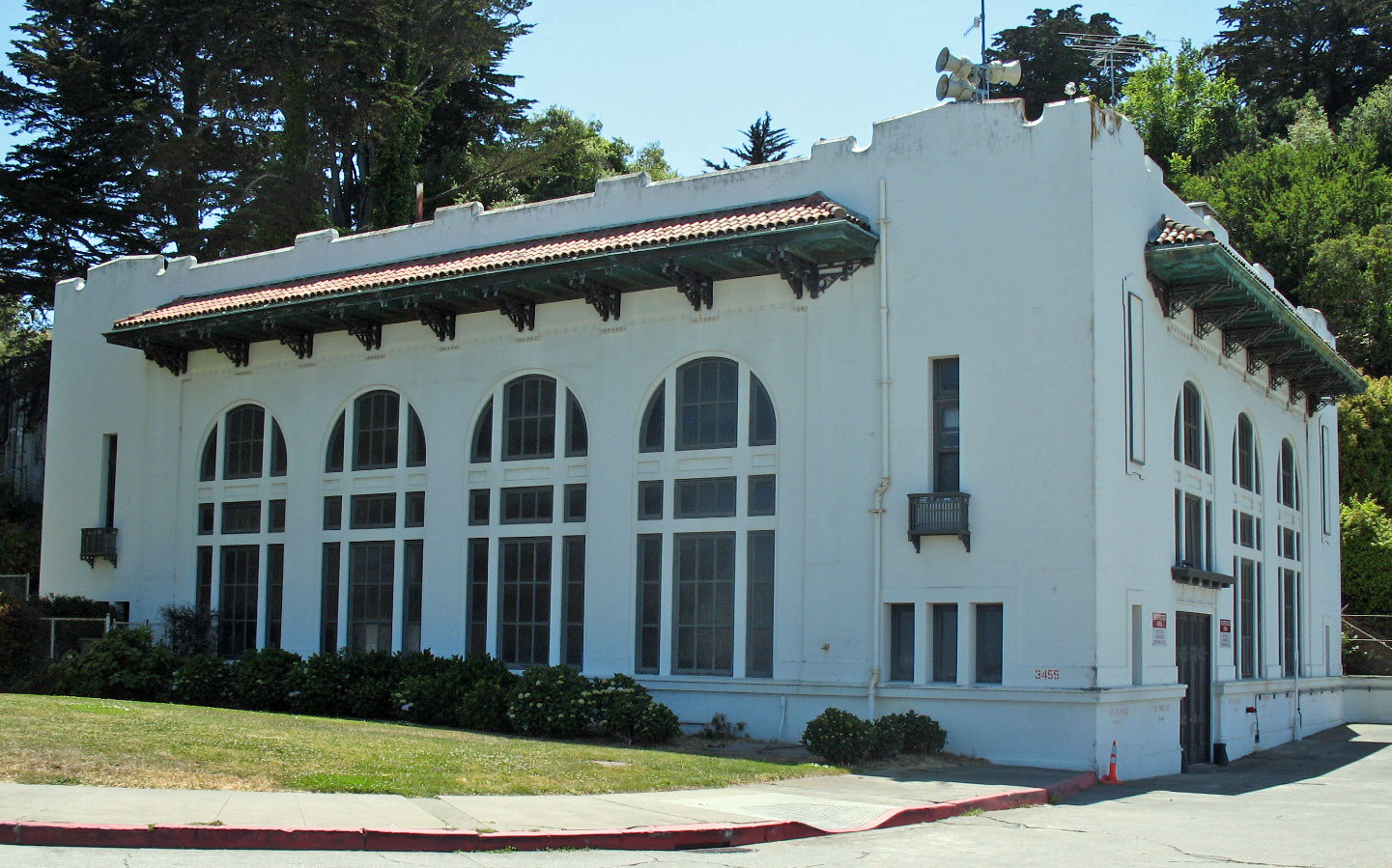
Pumping Station No. 2

There are two emergency pumping stations present within the AWSS:

- Pumping Station No. 1: Basement of San Francisco Fire Department Headquarters, 698 Second Street at Townsend St.
- Pumping Station No. 2: Van Ness Avenue and San Francisco Bicycle Route 2 in Fort Mason.

Both stations are capable of pumping 10,000 US gallons per minute (38,000 L/min) of salt water at a pressure of 300 pounds per square inch (2,100 kPa) with on-site generators. Pumping Station No. 2 is listed on the National Register of Historic Places.

=== Fireboats ===
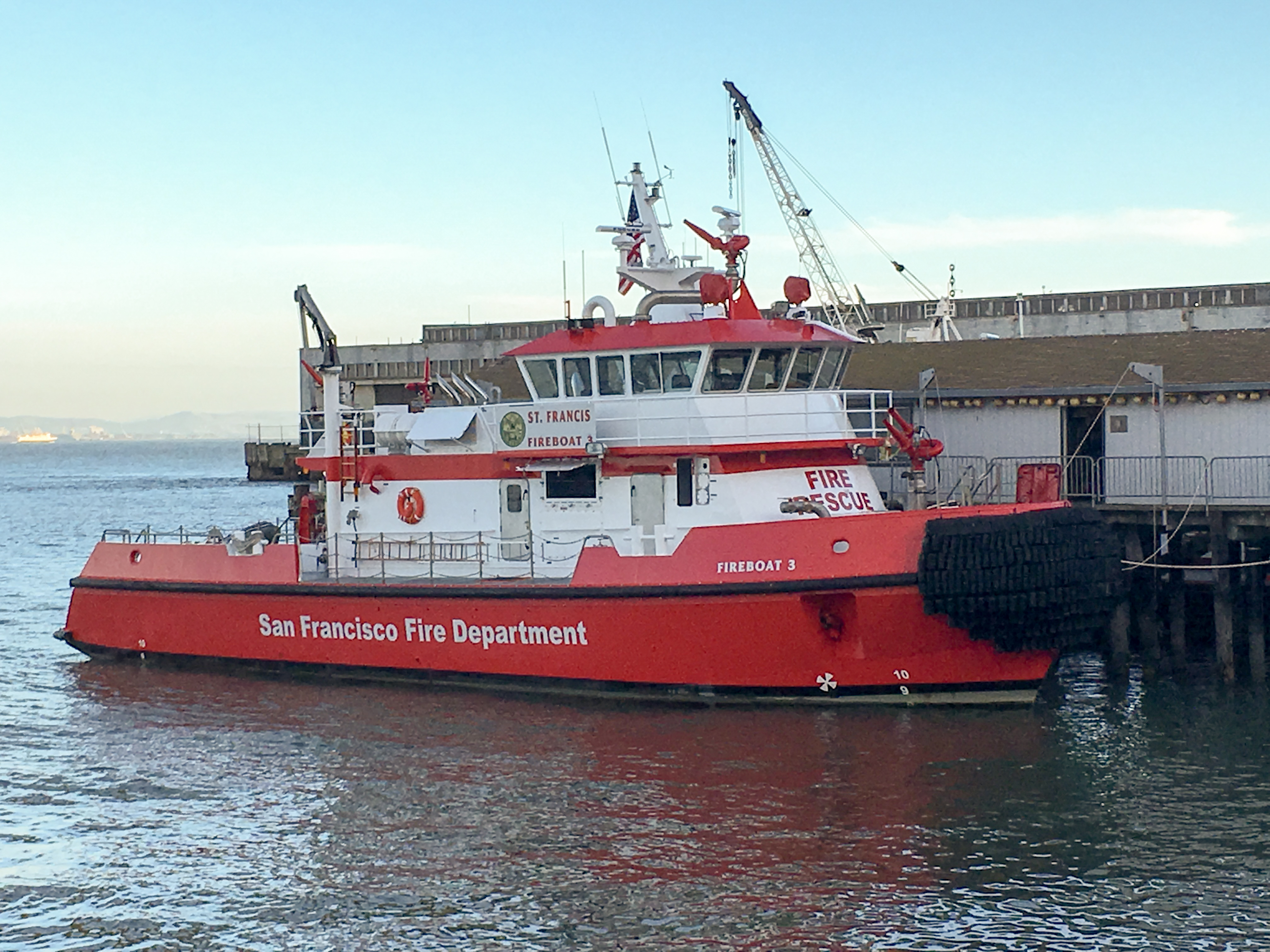
St. Francis fireboat

To supplement any failure of the pumping stations or reservoirs, the city’s two fireboats can be utilized to deliver salt water into the system. They can also deliver water by hose line to areas near the waterfront.

- Phoenix: 9,600 US gallons per minute (36,000 L/min) at 150 pounds per square inch (1,000 kPa)
- St. Francis: 18,000 US gallons per minute (68,000 L/min) at 150 pounds per square inch (1,000 kPa)

=== Cisterns ===
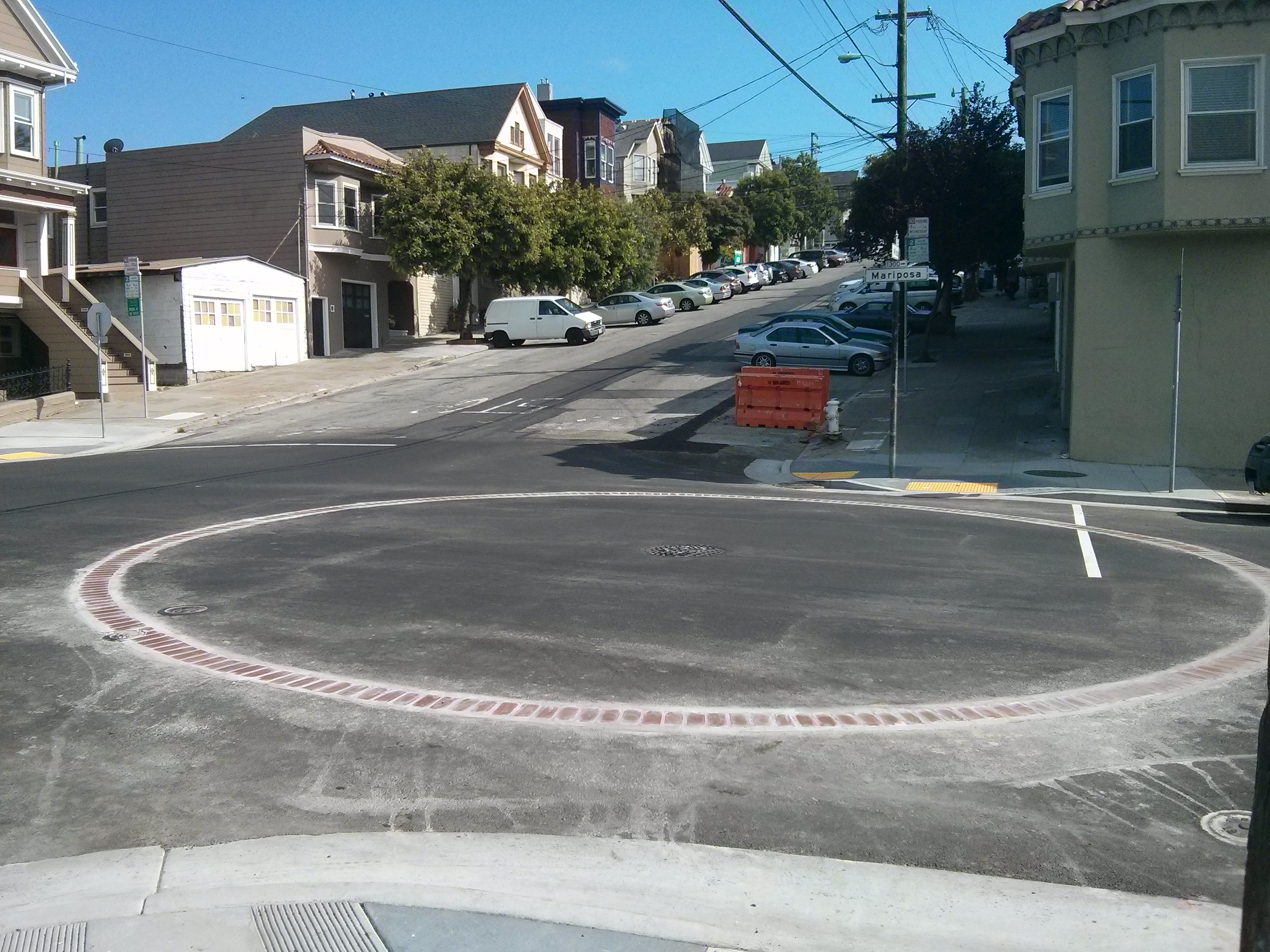
Brick circle denoting the location of an underground cistern

As a final measure to counter a failure of the AWSS piping, the city maintains a network of 177 independent underground water cisterns. Sizes vary from 75,000 to 200,000 US gallons (280,000 to 760,000 L) with a total storage capacity of over 11 million U.S. gallons (42 million liters) of water. These cisterns are visible at street level with manholes surrounded by a circle or rectangle of red brick.
