= Fireboats of California =

California's major ports have long traditions of maintaining dedicated fireboats, and, soon after Al Qaeda's attack on September 1st, 2001, FEMA started issuing port security grants equipping fireboats for California's smaller ports, that are also equipped to work when hazardous materials have been released.

Californian ports equipped with fireboats
image	city	first boat	number of boats	pumping capacity of most powerful boat	notes
	Long Beach, California	1942, Charles S. Windham	4	41,000 gpm	
	San Diego, California	1919, Bill Kettner	6		All six vessels have modest capacity -- the smallest is operated by the city's lifeguard department.
	San Francisco, California	1878, Governor Irwin	3	18,000 gpm	
	Los Angeles, California				
	San Rafael, California	2016 Confidence	1		The $50,000 cost of this used vessel was paid for through a grant from a local charity.
	Alameda, California	2001 Big Jim LeMoine	2	500 gpm	The Big Jim LeMoine was retired in 2008, and replaced by the superior, but still small Deanna Jo in 2014.

== See also ==
- Fireboats of Long Beach, California
- Fireboats of San Diego
- Fireboats of San Francisco
