= Cyclogyro =

Aircraft configuration that uses a horizontal-axis cyclorotor as a rotor wing

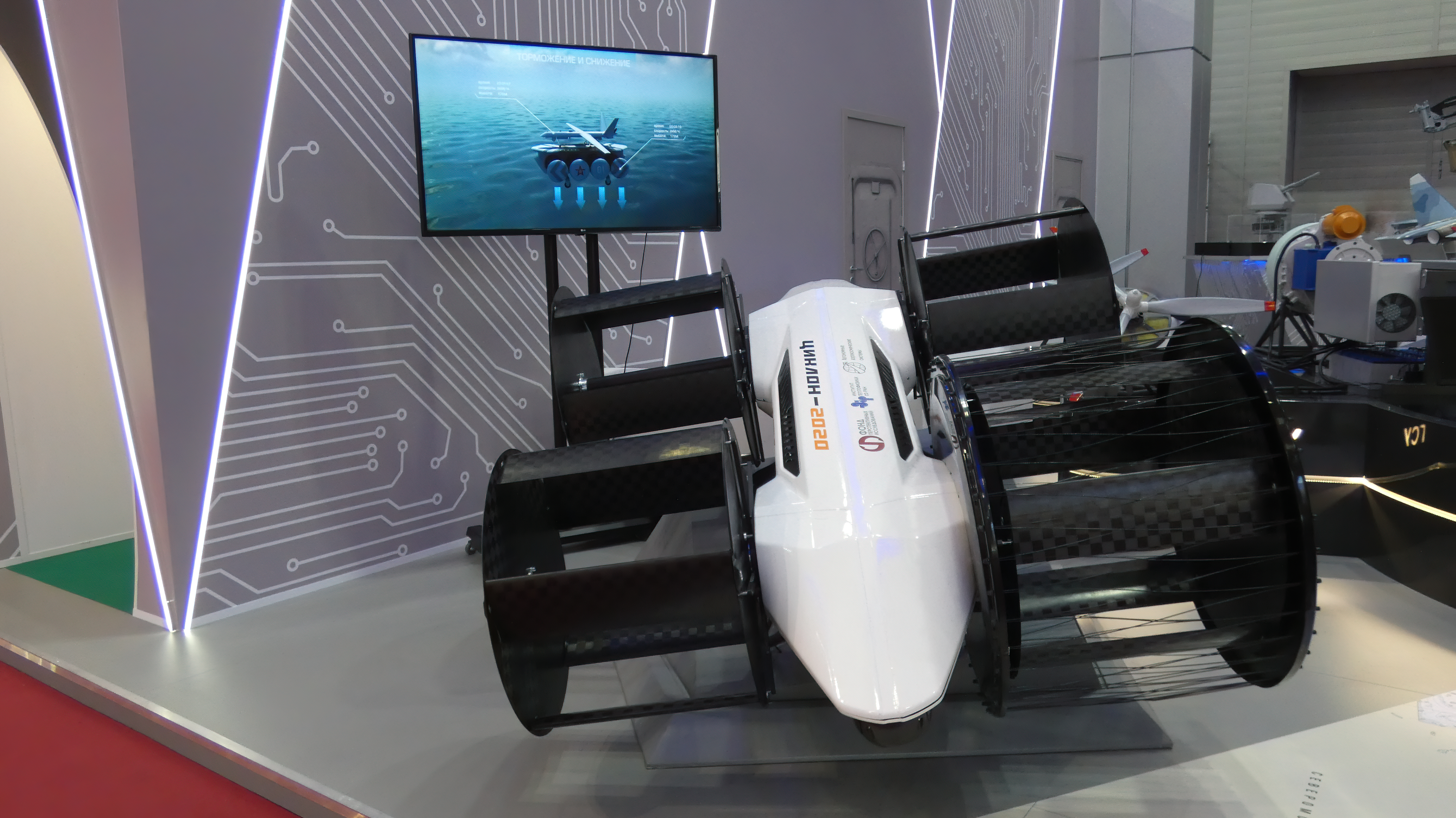
Cyclone-2020 during the Armiya 2021 exhibition

Concept drawing of a cyclogyro

The cyclogyro (cyclocopter) is an aircraft configuration that uses a horizontal-axis cyclorotor as a rotor wing to provide lift and, sometimes, also propulsion and control. In principle, the cyclogyro is capable of vertical take off and landing and hovering performance, like a helicopter, while potentially benefiting from some of the advantages of a fixed-wing aircraft.

The first untethered model cyclogyro flight came in 2011 at China's Northwestern Polytechnic Institute.

The performance of traditional rotors deteriorates at low Reynolds Numbers by low angle-of-attack blade stall. Current hover-capable MAVs can stay aloft for minutes. Cyclorotor MAVs (very small scale cyclogyros) could utilize unsteady lift to extend endurance. The smallest cyclogyro flown to date weighs 29 grams and was developed by the vertical flight laboratory at Texas A&M University.

Commercial cyclogyro UAVs are under development by D-Daelus, Pitch Aeronautics, and CycloTech.

== Principles of operation ==
The cyclogyro wing resembles a paddle wheel, with airfoil blades replacing the paddles. Like a helicopter, the blade pitch (angle of attack) can be adjusted either collectively (all together) or cyclically (as they move around the rotor's axis). In normal forward flight, the blades are given a slight positive pitch at the upper and forward portions of their arc, producing lift and, if powered, also forward thrust. They are given flat or negative pitch at the bottom and are "flat" through the rest of the circle to produce little or no lift in other directions. Blade pitch can be adjusted to change the thrust profile, allowing the cyclogyro to travel in any direction without the need for separate control surfaces. Differential thrust between the two wings (one on either side of the fuselage) can be used to turn the aircraft around its vertical axis, although conventional tail surfaces may be used as well.

The cyclogyro's cyclorotor is similar to a Voith Drive, which is a type of propeller used on some boats. They work in almost exactly the same way, except a Voith Drive can produce a force in any direction, whilst a cyclogyro is only designed to produce lift. The other main difference is that Voith Drives work underwater but cyclogyros work in air.

The cyclogyro is distinct from the Flettner airplane, which uses a cylindrical wing rotor to harness the Magnus effect.

Animation of cyclogyro wing mechanics

== History ==
Jonathan Edward Caldwell, a pioneer of an American version of a Cyclogyro aircraft propulsion, took out patent number 1,640,645. It was granted on August 30th, 1927.

The Schroeder S1 of 1930 was a full-size prototype which used the cyclogyro for forward thrust only. Adolf Rohrbach of Germany designed a full VTOL version in 1933, which was later developed in the US and featured a tall streamlined fuselage to keep the wings clear of the ground. Another example was built by Rahn Aircraft in 1935, which used two large-chord rotary wings instead of a multi-blade wheel driven by a 240 hp supercharged Wright Whirlwind

The cyclogyro has been revisited in the twenty-first century, as a possible configuration for unmanned aerial vehicles.

== See also ==
- FanWing
- Rotary-wing aircraft
- VTOL/STOL/VSTOL/STOVL
- Voith Schneider Propeller
