= Vigilance (fireboat) =

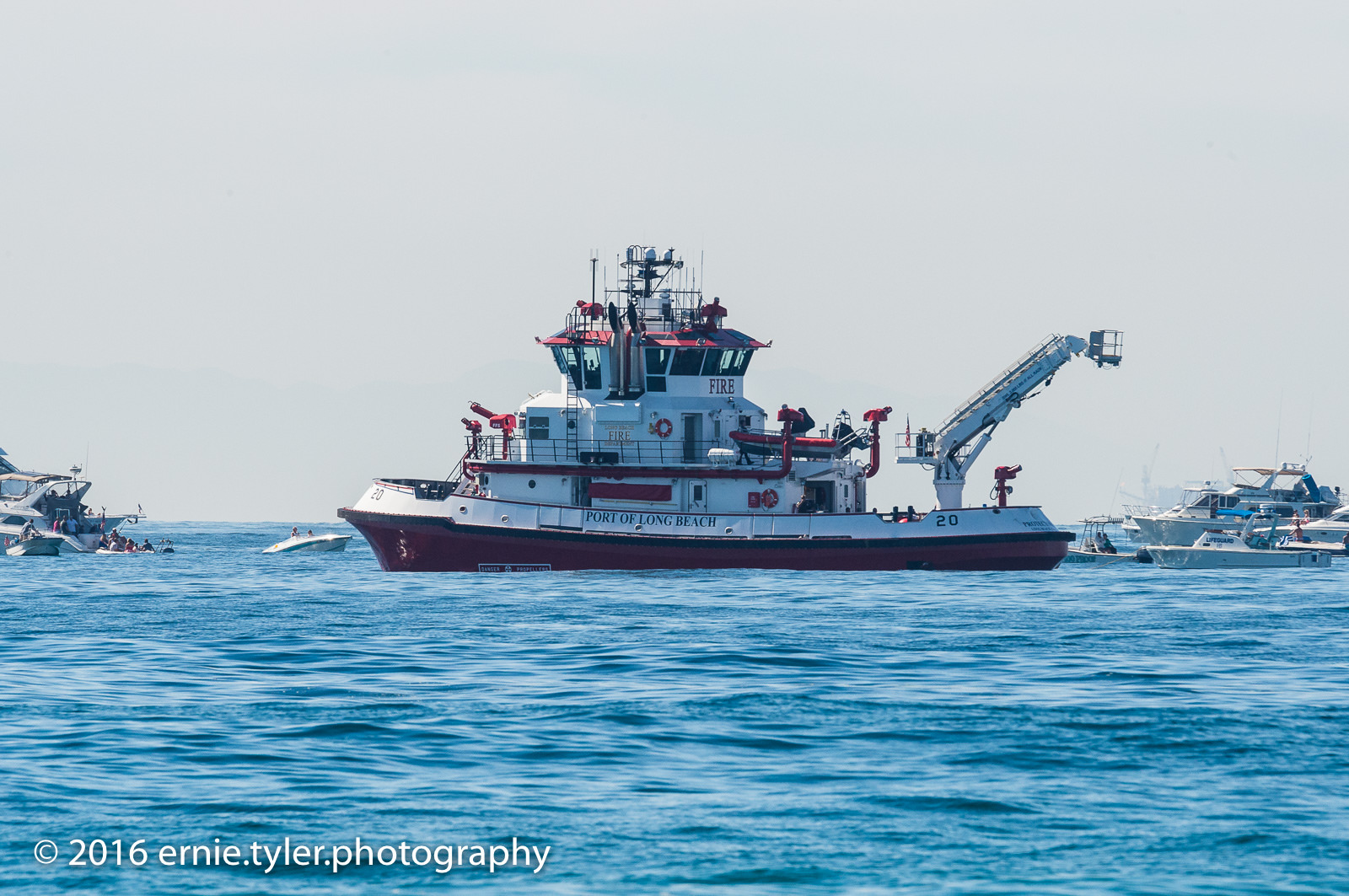
- Sister ship Protector

History

United States
- Name: Vigilance
- Operator: Long Beach Fire Department
- Ordered: 2010
- Builder: Foss Maritime inc.
- Cost: $25,500,000
- Completed: 2017
- Commissioned: 2017

General characteristics
- Type: Fireboat
- Length: 108 ft (33 m)
- Draft: 15 ft 10 in (4.83 m)
- Propulsion: Voith-Schneider propellers
- Speed: 13 knots (24 km/h; 15 mph)
- Endurance: 5 days
- Complement: 6
- Crew: 6

Vigilance is a fireboat operated by Long Beach, California. It is the second of two large fireboats Long Beach commissioned and the largest on North America's West Coast.

Vigilance and Protector were designed by Robert Allan Limited, a firm known for designing many widely admired tugboats, fireboats and support vessels.

The Vigilance is propelled by a pair of Voith-Schneider propellers, an advanced propulsion system that bears some resemblance to helicopter propulsion, and enable instantaneous changes in the propeller thrust. It is 108 feet long, with a maximum speed of 13 knots. The ship's ten water cannons can pump 41,000 gallons per minute, more than four times as much as its predecessors. The cannons are able to throw water up to 236 feet (72 m) in the air, and up to 580 feet (180 m) away.

In addition to firefighting duties, Fireboat 20 and its sister-ship have air-tight crew compartments and a decontamination chamber, so they are equipped to respond to the releases of hazardous material, in particular they can respond to radiological, poison gas, or germ warfare attacks. The vessels pumps can de-water flooded structures. The vessels are highly automated, and require only a crew of four. They can transport 12 additional individuals. Part of the cabin can serve as an emergency infirmary. The pair of vessels was budgeted at $51 million.

== Operational career ==
The Vigilance was commissioned on November 13, 2017.

The Vigilance and its sister ship Protector helped celebrate the 2019 Great Pacific Air Show.
