= Protector (fireboat) =

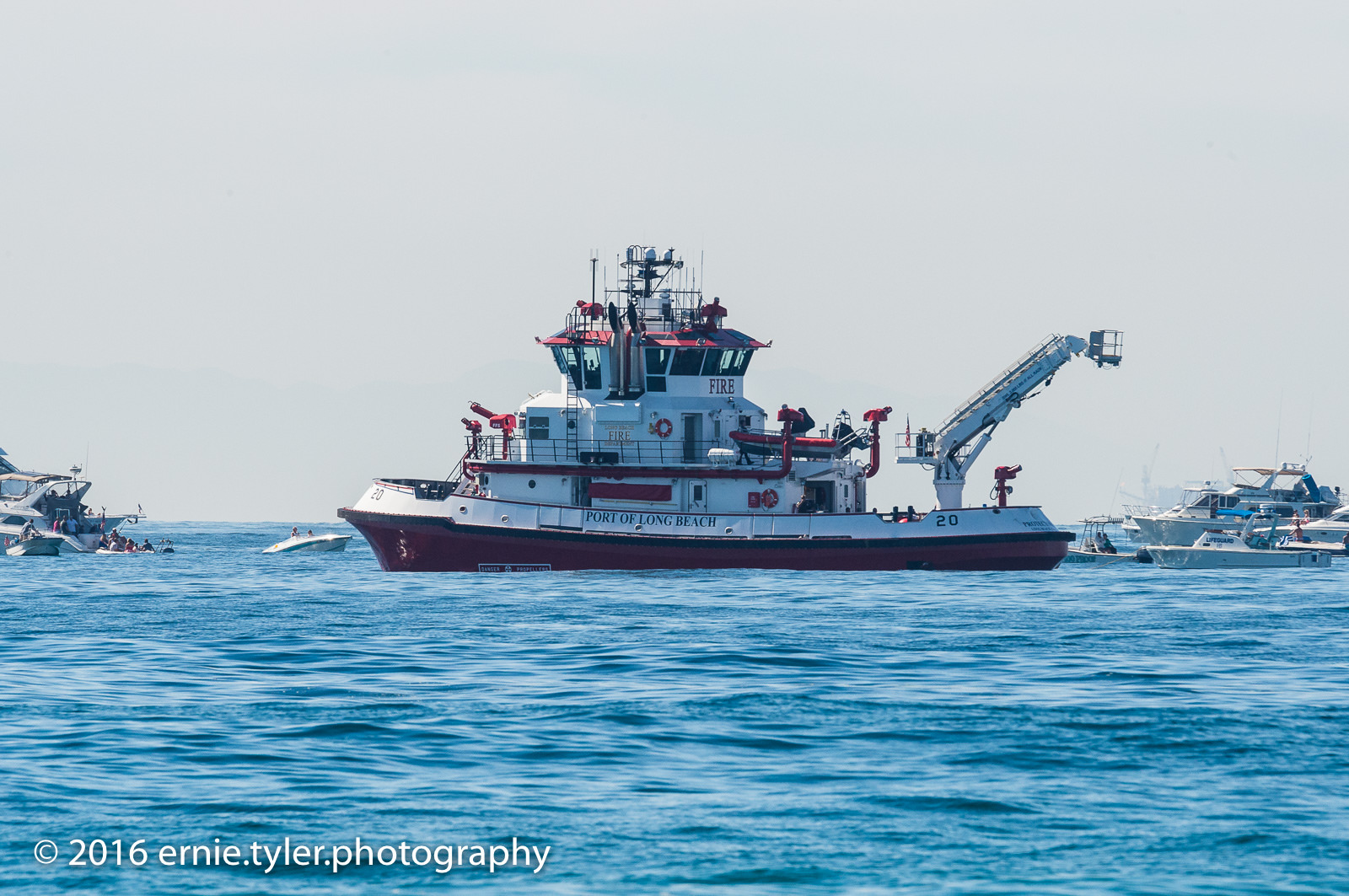

History

United States
- Name: Fireboat 20
- Operator: Long Beach Fire Department
- Ordered: 2010
- Builder: Foss Maritime inc.
- Cost: $25,500,000
- Completed: May 2014

General characteristics
- Type: Fireboat
- Length: 108 ft (33 m)
- Draft: 15 ft 10 in (4.83 m)
- Propulsion: Voith-Schneider propellers
- Speed: 13 knots (24 km/h; 15 mph)
- Endurance: 5 days
- Complement: 6
- Crew: 6

The City of Long Beach, California started to operate a new fireboat, now known as the Protector, in May 2014. The vessel was known as Fireboat 20, until she was officially commissioned, on June 8, 2016. A sister ship will follow within a year. The two new vessels will replace the Challenger and the Liberty, commissioned in 1987. The earlier vessels had a troubled maintenance record. She will be one of the most powerful fireboats in the world.

Protector is propelled by a pair of Voith-Schneider propellers, an advanced propulsion system that bears some resemblance to helicopter propulsion, and enable instantaneous changes in the propeller thrust. She is 108 feet long, with a maximum speed of 13 knots. Her ten water cannon can pump 41,000 gallons per minute, more than four times as much as her predecessors. She is able to throw her water up to 236 feet (72 m) in the air, and up to 580 feet (180 m) away.

The two vessels were designed by Robert Allan Limited, a firm known for designing many widely admired tugboats, fireboats and support vessels.

In addition to firefighting duties Fireboat 20 and her sister have air-tight crew compartments and a decontamination chamber, so they are equipped to respond to the releases of hazardous material, in particular they can respond to radiological, poison gas, or germ warfare attacks. The vessels pumps can de-water flooded structures. The vessels are highly automated, and require only a crew of four. They can transport 12 additional individuals. Part of the cabin can serve as an emergency infirmary. The pair of vessels was budgeted at $51 million.

== Operational history ==
On May 20, 2016, the Protector joined other emergency vessels and vehicles in fighting a fire at Long Beach's Seal Beach Pier.

Protector and Vigilance helped celebrate the 2019 Great Pacific Air Show.

== See also ==
- Fireboats of Long Beach, California
- Fireboats of California
