= Voith Schneider Propeller =

Proprietary marine propulsion system

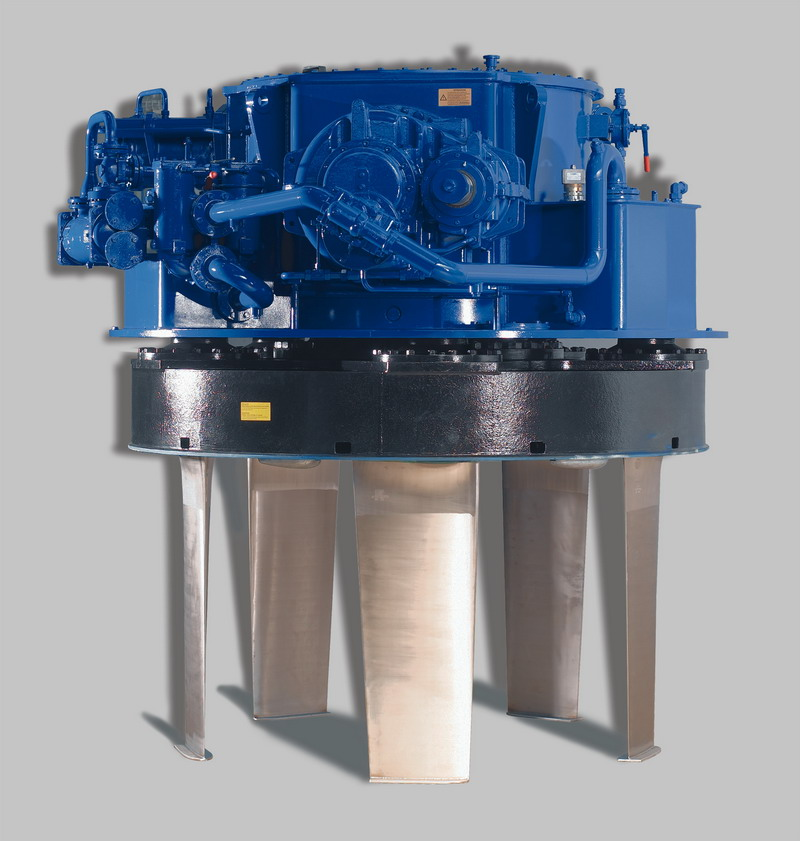
Voith Schneider Propeller

The Voith Schneider Propeller (VSP) is a specialized marine propulsion system (MPS) manufactured by the Voith Group based on a cyclorotor design. It is highly maneuverable, being able to change the direction of its thrust almost instantaneously. It is widely used on tugs and ferries. The Voith Schneider drive was invented by Ernst Schneider. It has been developed and produced by Voith in Heidenheim an der Brenz and St. Pölten since 1926.

== Operation ==
From a circular plate, rotating around a vertical axis, a circular array of vertical blades (in the shape of hydrofoils) protrude out of the bottom of the ship. Each blade can rotate itself around a vertical axis. The internal gear changes the angle of attack of the blades in sync with the rotation of the plate, so that each blade can provide thrust in any direction.

Unlike the azimuth thruster (where a conventional propeller is rotated about the vertical axis to direct its thrust, allowing a vessel to steer without the use of a rudder), the Voith-Schneider drive merely requires changing the pattern of orientation of the vertical blades. In a marine situation, this provides for a drive which can be directed in any direction and thus does away with the need for a rudder. It is highly efficient and provides for an almost instantaneous change of direction. These drives are becoming increasingly common in work boats such as fireboats and tugboats where extreme maneuverability is needed.

Azimuth thrusters (and Kort nozzles) have both advantages and disadvantages when compared to cycloidal drives. The azimuth thruster is less efficient and slower to maneuver, but is likely to be cheaper in the short term. Life cycle costs favour the Voith solution, something reflected in the residual value of a Voith water tractor. A choice is made on the basis of perceived performance requirements. Instead of a Kort nozzle, VSPs are often fitted with a "thrust plate" or "propeller guard" which acts as a nozzle at low speed, protects the VSP against grounding and provides another blocking location during drydocking.

A low acoustic signature favours the device's use in minesweepers by minimising cavitation (usually produced at the tips of axial propellers) as the rotor does not need to rotate as fast for a given thrust. The underwater sound signature of the MV North Sea Giant (IMO: 9524073, MMSI: 248039000) dynamic positioning vessel was measured by the International Centre for Island Technology (ICIT) whilst installing a foundation monopile for the Voith tidal energy device in the Fall of Warness, Orkney (Ref Beharie and Side, 2011).

VSPs are offered with an input power range of 160 kW to 3900 kW

Operation of a Voith Schneider propeller

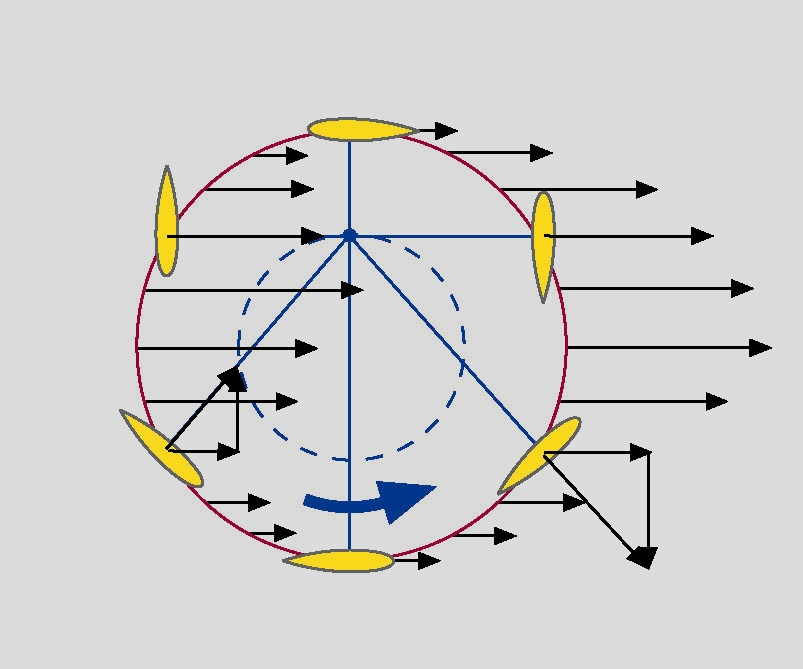
Lift forces imparted to the VSP from the water body

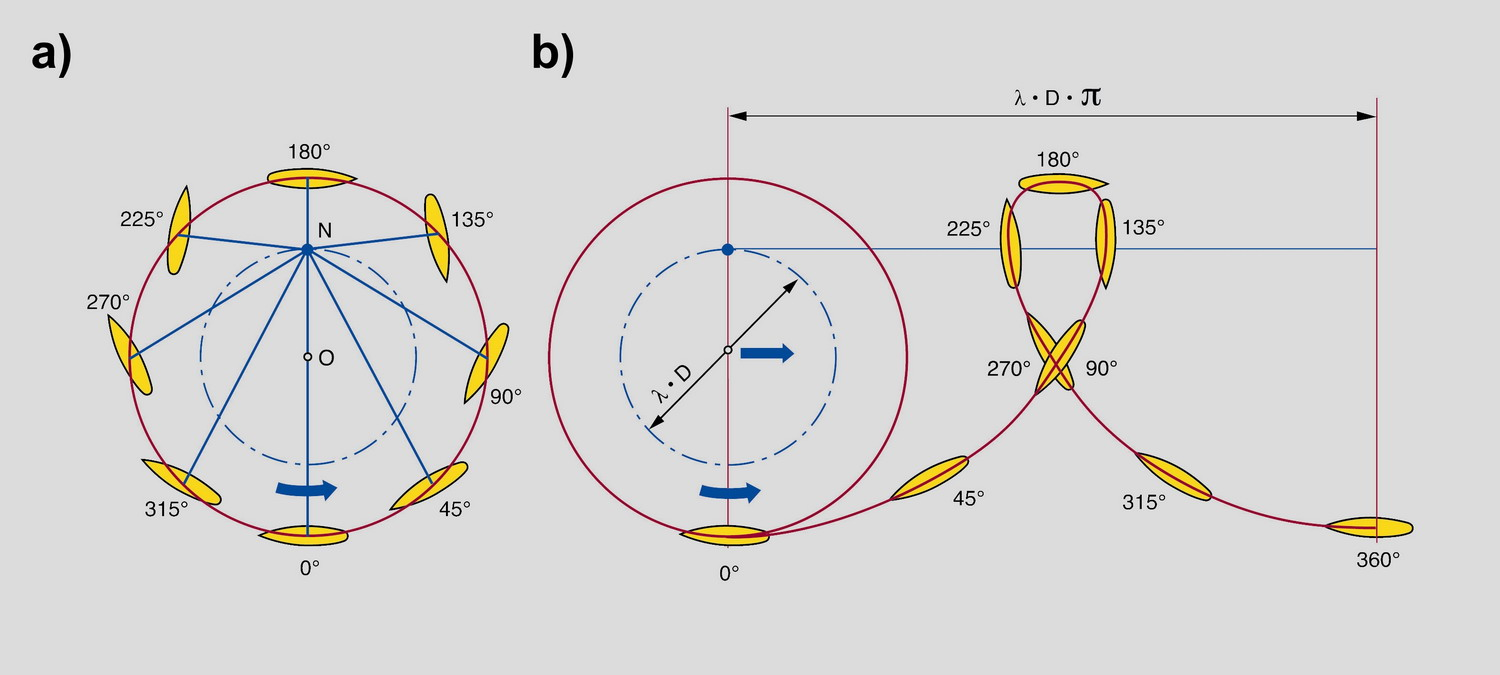
Path of a blade in the water

== History ==
The Voith Schneider propeller was originally a design for a hydro-electric turbine. Its Austrian inventor, Ernst Schneider, had a chance meeting on a train with a manager at Voith's subsidiary St. Pölten works; this led to the turbine being investigated by Voith's engineers, who discovered that although it was no more efficient than other water turbines, Schneider's design worked well as a pump by reversing the flow through the device. By changing the orientation of the vertical blades, it could be made to function as a combined propeller and rudder.

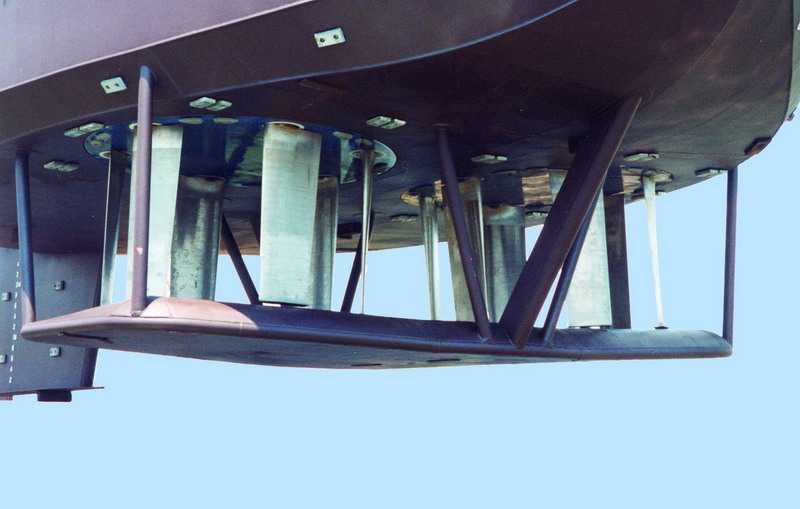
Twin Voith Schneider propeller with thrust plate on a tug's hull

In 1928 a prototype was installed in a 60-hp motor launch named Torqueo (Latin:I spin) and trials were carried out on Lake Constance. A number of German minesweepers (R boats) were fitted with VSPs; the first of these was the R8, built in 1929 by Lürssen. By 1931 VSPs were being fitted in new vessels on Lake Constance run by the German State Railways. The first such ship to use the Voith Schneider propeller was the excursion boat Kempten. Two German 1935-type M class minesweepers M-1 and M-2 were fitted with VSPs.

The first British ship to use Voith Schneider propellers was the double-ended Isle of Wight ferry MV Lymington, launched in 1938. Some 80 ships had been installed with VSPs by the end of the 1930s, including the uncompleted 1938 German aircraft carrier Graf Zeppelin (two auxiliary units in the bow), and the Japanese submarine cable laying ship Toyo-maru (also 1938).

Three vessels (John Burns, Ernest Bevin, and James Newman) which were in service for the Woolwich Ferry until 2018 featured Voith-Schneider propulsion systems. They were built in 1963 by the Caledon Shipbuilding & Engineering Company of Dundee and featured one VSP in the bow and a second in the stern for remarkable maneuverability. The Tay Ferries Scotscraig which were built by the Caledon in the 1950s also used VSPs.It was essentially a replacement copy of the earlier Abercraig ferry, which was built by Fleming and Ferguson Paisley yard for Dundee Harbour crossings and launched in 1938. The "Abercraig" also featured VSPs.

The US Navy built twelve VSP-equipped Osprey-class coastal minehunters in the 1990s. These vessels have been decommissioned, six were sold to foreign navies. and six were sold for "dismantlement purposes only." The French Navy operates sixteen tugboats of the RPC12 type, that can provide a 12-tonne bollard pull thanks to two Voith Schneider propellers.

The same device, mounted on a horizontal rather than a vertical axis, has been used to provide lift and propulsion on a few experimental aeroplanes, known as "cyclogyros". None of them were very successful. It has also more recently been proposed as an alternative to rotors for drone applications.

== See also ==
- Azipod – Electric drive azimuth thruster
- Cycloid – Curve traced by a point on a rolling circle
- Cyclorotor – Perpendicular-axis marine propulsion system
- Dynamic positioning – Automatic ship station- and heading-holding systems
- HMS Challenger
