= RPC12 =

Remorqueurs Portuaires et Côtiers de 12 tonnes de traction au point fixe (RPC12)
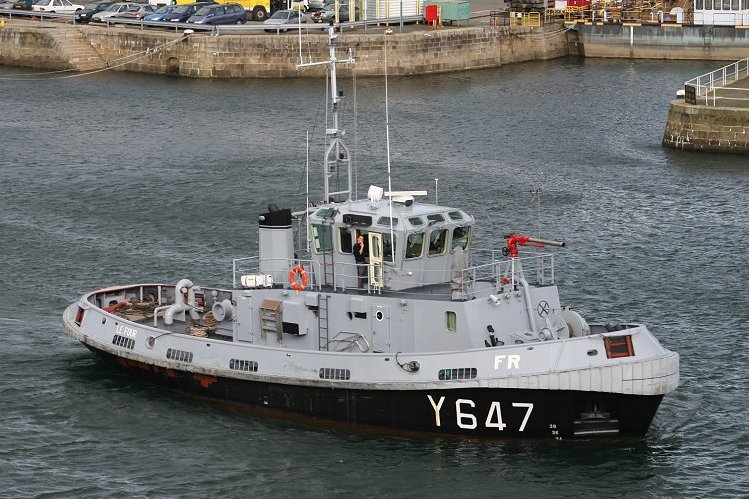
- Le Four maneuvering in Brest harbour on 10 November 2004

Class overview
- Name: RPC12
- Builders: Lorient Naval Industries (LNI), Socarenam
- Operators: French Navy
- Preceded by: Actif class; Acajou class; Aigrette class; Bonite class
- Subclasses: RPC12 type A; RPC12 type B; RP12

General characteristics
- Type: Harbour tugboat
- Displacement: 220 tonnes (259 full load)
- Length: 25 m (82 ft 0 in)
- Beam: 8.4 m (27 ft 7 in)
- Height: 13.2 m (43 ft 4 in) (6.9 m, 23 ft with mast removed)
- Draught: 3.4 m (11 ft 2 in)
- Propulsion: Type A: 2 × SACM-Wärtsilä UD30 V12 M3D diesel engines (2 × 683 hp, 509 kW); Type B: 2 × Baudouin 12P15 2S SKC diesel engines (2 × 660 hp (490 kW))
- Speed: 11 knots (20 km/h; 13 mph)
- Range: 800 nmi (1,500 km; 920 mi) at 10 knots (19 km/h; 12 mph)
- Boats & landing craft carried: 1 × rigid-hulled inflatable boat
- Complement: 5 (harbour operations) to 8 (coastal operations)
- Sensors & processing systems: One navigation radar: Type A: Decca RM170; A682 Rascas: Furuno; Others: Racal Decca Bridgemaster C181-4

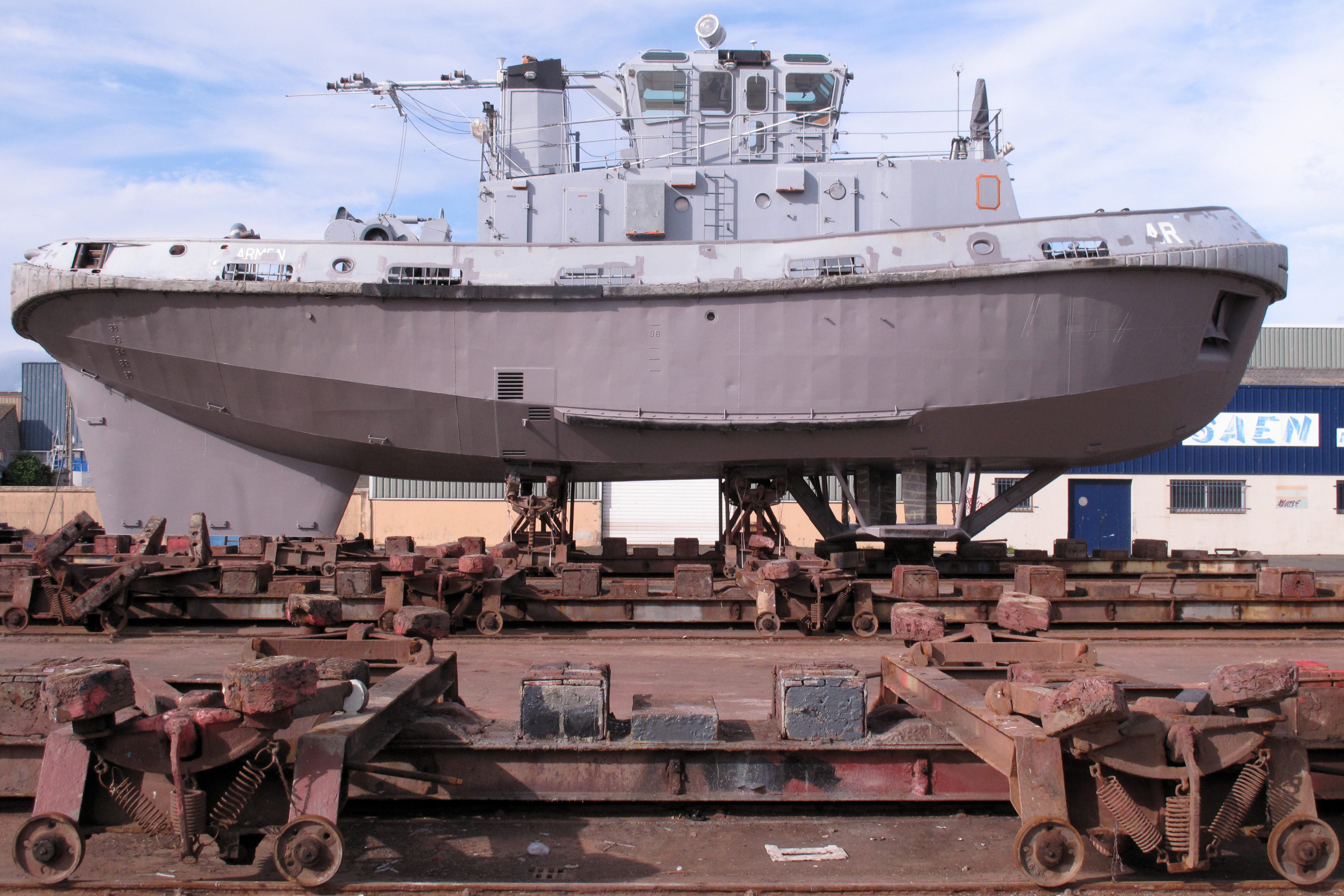
Profile view of Armen undergoing repairs, with her Voith Schneider propellers clearly visible under the hull

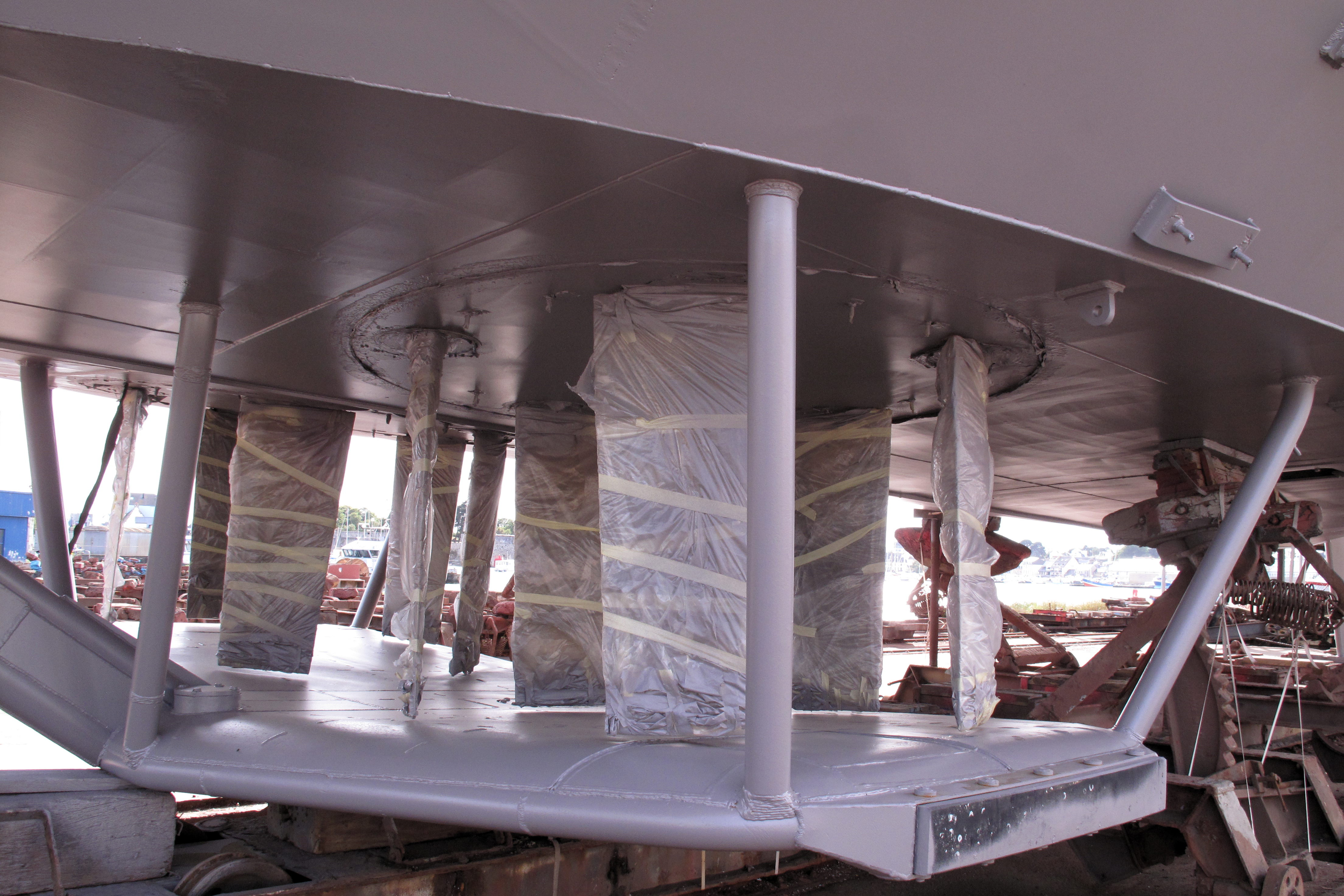
Detail of Armen's propellers

The RPC12 (Remorqueurs Portuaires et Côtiers de 12 tonnes de traction au point fixe, "Harbour and Coastal tugboat, 12-tonne bollard pull") is a type of harbour tugboat operated by the French Navy. They utilise Voith propulsion to develop a 12-tonne bollard pull.

== Design and description ==
The RPC12 has been classified into three sub-types: the original version, called "Type A" (comprising Fréhel and Saire), was designed as a dual-purpose tugboat capable of supporting shipping operations both in harbours and off the coast. After the two first units, the design was simplified, while retaining most functionalities, to reduce cost, yielding the "Type B" (comprising Armen, La Houssaye, Kéréon, Sicié and Taunoa). The nine remaining units constitute the RP12 type, which is further simplified to operate only within harbours (comprising Lardier, Giens, Mengam, Balaguier, Taillat, Nividic, Port Cros, Le Four and Eckmühl). Because of these differing capabilities, the RPC12 of both types are classified "auxiliaries", with an "A"-prefixed pennant number, while the RP12 are considered "yard vessels", with the corresponding "Y"-prefixed pennant numbers.

The latest in the series, Rascas, is an improved high-sea ship with better sonic isolation and air conditioning, or use in tropical waters, and a different radar.

== Ships ==
Ship	Pennant	Builder	Commissioned	Home port	Fate
Fréhel	A675	Lorient Naval Industries (LNI)	23 May 1989	Cherbourg	In active service
Saire	A676	LNI	6 October 1989	Cherbourg	In active service
Armen	A677	LNI	6 December 1991	Brest	In active service
La Houssaye	A678	LNI	30 October 1992	Brest	In active service
Kéréon	A679	LNI	5 December 1992	Brest	In active service
Sicié	A680	LNI	6 October 1994	Lorient (until 1995), Toulon	In active service
Taunoa	A681	SOCARENAM	9 March 1996	Brest	In active service
Lardier	Y638	SOCARENAM	12 April 1995	Toulon	In active service
Giens	Y639	SOCARENAM	2 December 1994	Toulon	In active service
Mengam	Y640	SOCARENAM	6 October 1994	Brest	In active service
Balaguier	Y641	SOCARENAM	8 July 1995	Toulon	In active service
Taillat	Y642	SOCARENAM	18 October 1995	Toulon	In active service
Nividic	Y643	SOCARENAM	13 December 1996	Brest	In active service
Port Cros	Y649	SOCARENAM	21 June 1997	Toulon	In active service
Le Four	Y647	SOCARENAM	13 March 1998	Brest	In active service
Eckmühl	Y646	SOCARENAM			In active service
Rascas	A682	SOCARENAM	22 November 2003	Toulon	In active service
