= Benning Race Track =

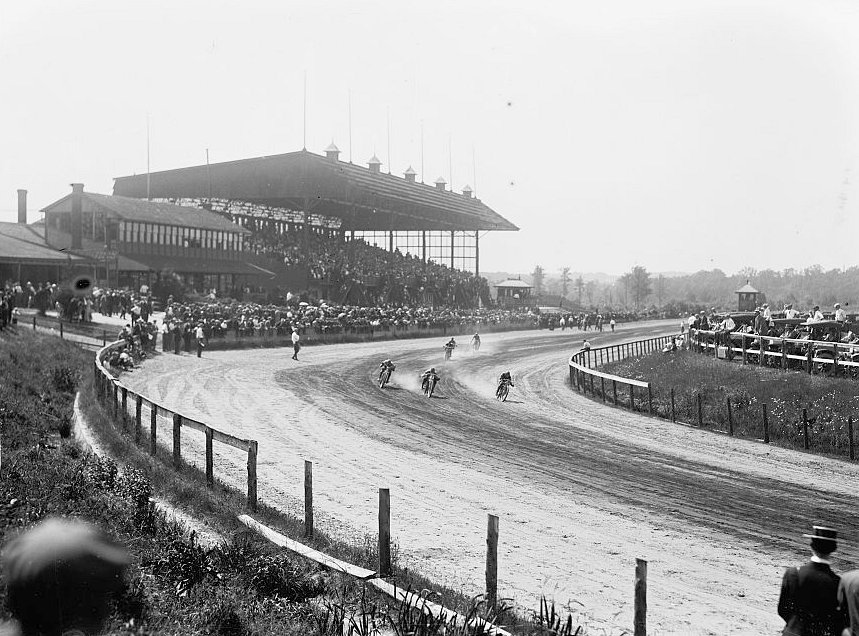
Benning Race Track

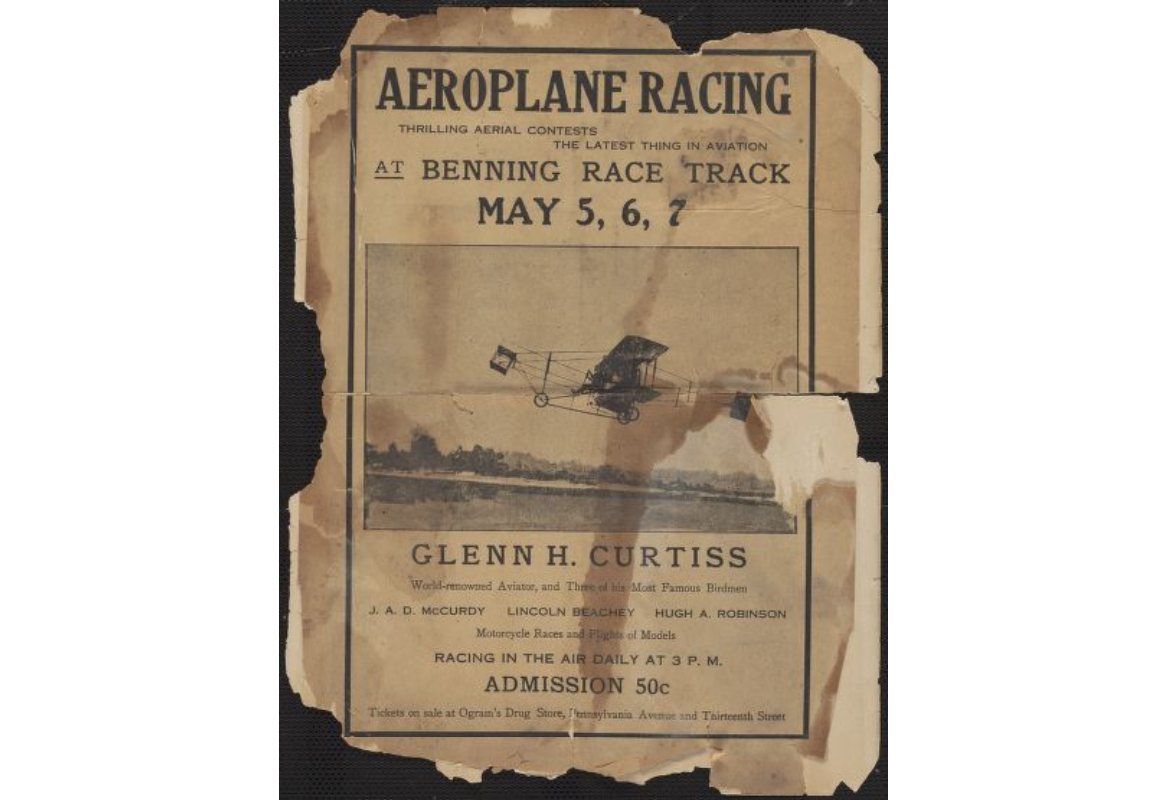
Benning Race Track Aeroplane Racing

Benning Race Track was a horse racing and motorsport venue that opened in 1890 on the east side of Washington, D.C. With the close proximity to the capital, the races were attended by many politicians. A journalist once took a photo of Alice Roosevelt Longworth placing a bet, much to the chagrin of her father Theodore Roosevelt, who suppressed the sale of the photos to the newspapers. Famous jockey Walter Miller won all five races during a Benning meet in 1906. The track operated until Congress banished horse racing in the District in 1908. The last race day was April 12 of that year and the grandstand burned in 1915.

After horse racing ended, the track was used for automobile racing though the 1910s. It continued as a training stable and event venue until the 1940s. In 1938, inventor Jonathan Edward Caldwell demonstrated his prototype Autogyro at the abandoned track.

In 1942, a developer bought the track to build the Mayfair Mansions apartment complex. Mayfair Mansions opened in 1946, providing housing options for working and middle class African American families.

== Selected Stakes Races ==
- Grand Consolation Stakes
- Washington Nursery Stakes
