= Fireboats of Long Beach, California =

The Long Beach Fire Department of the city of Long Beach, California owns and operates Fireboats in Long Beach, providing fire protection and rescue services for the Port of Long Beach and the marina and beach areas of the city of Long Beach Although administered separately, the port facilities of Los Angeles and Long Beach are adjacent, and together, form one of the largest container ports in the world. The cities of Los Angeles and Long Beach have a mutual aid arrangement where one will loan fireboats to the other in case of need.

image	name	launched	notes
	Charles S. Windham	1942	The city's first fireboat.
	Fireboat 1	1954	Fireboat 1, Long Beach's second fireboat.
	Fireboat 2	1954	Fireboat 2, Long Beach's third fireboat.
	Challenger	1987	The Los Angeles Times reported that the Challenger and Liberty began to show maintenance problems due to poor contrstruction within two years of their delivery.; Capable of pumping 10,000 Gallons per minute.
	Liberty	1987	The Liberty had the same corrosion problems as her sister ship, the Challenger, and by September 1988 the Long Beach Harbour Commission had to allocate an addition $883,000 to repair the vessels.
	Protector	2014	Commissioned on June 8, 2016.; Designed to mount water cannons capable of fighting fires on the largest modern container ships.
	Vigilance	2015	Commissioned on November 13, 2017.; Design identical to Protector.

Workboat magazine reported, on June 14, 2017, that Long Beach planned to spend $100 million USD to construct two new firestations for its two new fireboats.

== See also ==
- Los Angeles Fire Department
