= Grand Consolation Stakes =

- Class: Stakes race
- Location: Benning Race Track, Deanwood, Washington, D. C., United States
- Inaugurated: 1899
- Race type: Thoroughbred - Flat racing

Race information
- Distance: 1 1/16 miles
- Surface: Dirt
- Track: left-handed
- Qualification: Two-year-olds

The Grand Consolation Stakes was an American Thoroughbred horserace held from 1902 through 1907 at Benning Race Track in the Deanwood section of Washington, D.C.. A race on dirt at a distance of seven furlongs, it was open for two-year-old horses and was the track’s most valuable event.

In 1908, the United States Congress banned horse racing in the District of Columbia. On April 12 the Benning Race Track hosted its last day ever of racing.

== Racing notes ==
With jockey Willie Shaw aboard for trainer Jack Goldsborough and owner Jack Bennet, Flip Flap won the 1905 edition of the Grand Consolidation Stakes that would see her become the only filly to ever win this important race.

A few races prior to winning the 1906 Grand Consolidation Stakes, Monfort had earned the first win of his career in his second start on May 30, 1906 at Belmont Park where he won a purse race by six lengths over a large field of 17 competitors while setting a new track record for the 4½ furlong event on dirt.

== Records ==
Speed record:

- 1:25.40 – Lord of the Vale (1902)

Most wins by a jockey:

- 2 - Willie Shaw

Most wins by a trainer:

- no trainer won this race more than once.

Most wins by an owner:

- no owner won this race more than once.

== Winners ==
Year	Winner	Age	Jockey	Trainer	Owner	Dist. (Miles)	Time	Win $
1907	The Squire	2	Joe Notter	Thomas Welsh	Thomas Welsh	7 f	1:30.40	$3,050
1906	Monfort	2	Walter Miller	Thomas J. Healey	Richard T. Wilson Jr.	7 f	1:28.60	$3,700
1905	Flip Flap	2	Willie Shaw	A. J. Goldsborough	Jack A. Bennet	7 f	1:27.00	$3,825
1904	Dandelion	2	Willie Shaw	John E. Madden	Francis R. Hitchcock	7 f	1:27.60	$5,135
1903	Orthodox	2	Wallace Hicks	Arthur Carter	Morris L. Hayman	7 f	1:28.20	$6,530
1902	Lord of the Vale	2	Andrew Minder	John J. Hyland	August Belmont Jr.	7 f	1:25.40	$6,125
