= Washington Nursery Stakes =

- Class: Stakes race
- Location: Benning Race Track, Deanwood, Washington, D. C., United States
- Inaugurated: 1899-1908
- Race type: Thoroughbred - Flat racing

Race information
- Distance: 4½ furlongs
- Surface: Dirt
- Track: left-handed
- Qualification: Two-year-olds

The Washington Nursery Stakes was an American Thoroughbred horserace held from 1905 through 1908 at Benning Race Track in the Deanwood section of Washington, D.C.

In 1908, the United States Congress banned horse racing in the District of Columbia. The Benning Race Track shut done forever after it hosted what would be its last day of racing on April 12.

== Racing notes ==
While a short-lived race ended beyond the control of the racetrack’s owners, a “Nursery” race in the early part of the year is important to racetracks in order to give new and existing owners and trainers a chance to not only earn prize money, but to size up the competition for the coming year’s racing while comparative testing as to how their horses adapt to that particular track’s racing surface.

1907 winner Billie Hibbs was named by owner George Howard to honor William Beale Hibbs, founder of William B. Hibbs & Co. brokerage firm who was a member of the Executive Committee of the Washington Jockey Club and well connected in Federal political circles.

== Records ==
Speed record:

- 4½ furlongs – 0:56.40 : Oaklawn (1905)

Most wins by a jockey:

- no jockey won this race more than once

Most wins by a trainer:

- 2 - John Whalen (1905, 1906)

Most wins by an owner:

- 2 - August Belmont Jr. (1905, 1906)

== Winners ==
Year	Winner	Age	Jockey	Trainer	Owner	Dist. (Miles)	Time	Win$
1908	Personal	2	Joe McCahey	James McLaughlin	James McLaughlin	4½ f	0:57.20	$1,440
1907	Billie Hibbs	2	Louis A. Smith	William M. Garth	George Howard	4½ f	0:57.60	$1,390
1906	Curriculum	2	Charles Morris	John Whalen	August Belmont Jr.	4½ f	0:57.40	$1,330
1905	Oaklawn	2	Tommy Burns	John Whalen	August Belmont Jr.	4½ f	0:56.40	$1,210
