= Jonathan Edward Caldwell =

Canadian-American aeronautical engineer (1883–1955

Jonathan Edward Caldwell (March 24, 1883 – November 8, 1955) was a Canadian-American self-taught aeronautical engineer who designed a series of bizarre aircraft and started public companies in order to finance their construction. None of these was ever successful, and after his last known attempt in the later 1930s he disappeared, apparently to avoid securities fraud charges. His name was later connected with mythical German flying saucers, and he remains a fixture of the UFO genre.

Caldwell was born in Hensall, Ontario, Canada, the fifth son (and one of twelve children) of William Thomas Caldwell (1848–1930) and Sarah Alice Chamberlain (1852–1933). He moved to the United States in 1910 and attended Oregon State College, from 1912 to 1913, majoring in mechanical engineering. He formally emigrated from Canada in 1914 and applied for U.S. citizenship in 1915, while working as a farmer in Montana. In the 1920s, according to statements he made later in life, he became interested in aviation and began to study the fundamentals of aerodynamics.

== Cyclogyro ==
Diagram of the cyclogyro design from the company stationery. The image is inaccurate: the airfoils had a limited degree of rotation, and would face "down" on the front portion of the disk, whereas this image shows them facing forward.

In February 1923, Caldwell filed for a patent on a device he called the "cyclogyro". It consisted of an airplane fuselage with two paddle-wheel like attachments in place of the wings. The wheels were powered by an engine in the fuselage, spun to power the upper portion of the attachments forward – clockwise, as seen looking left from the cockpit. The wheels each featured four high aspect ratio airfoils, which were able to rotate around their horizontal axis in order to change their pitch.

By changing the pitch continually through the entire rotation, the lift of the airfoils could be tuned to produce thrust in any direction. For instance, to lift off vertically the airfoils were pitched to have a positive angle of attack only at the top of their rotation, just generating lift only at that point. In forward flight the angle at the top of the arc would be reduced to make the lift neutral, but they would retain their positive angle even through the forward part of the circle, producing forward thrust. By changing the angle in this fashion, the aircraft could be "lifted" in any direction, with differential thrust between the two "wings" allowing yaw to be applied.

Caldwell formed Gravity Aeroplane Company in Reno, Nevada (Caldwell was living in Santa Monica at the time) and issued stock in 1928. Their company stationery included an illustration showing the cyclogyro, a version with four airfoils per "wing", attached on the fuselage end to a large disk and the outer end to a cross-like support.

== Ornithopter ==
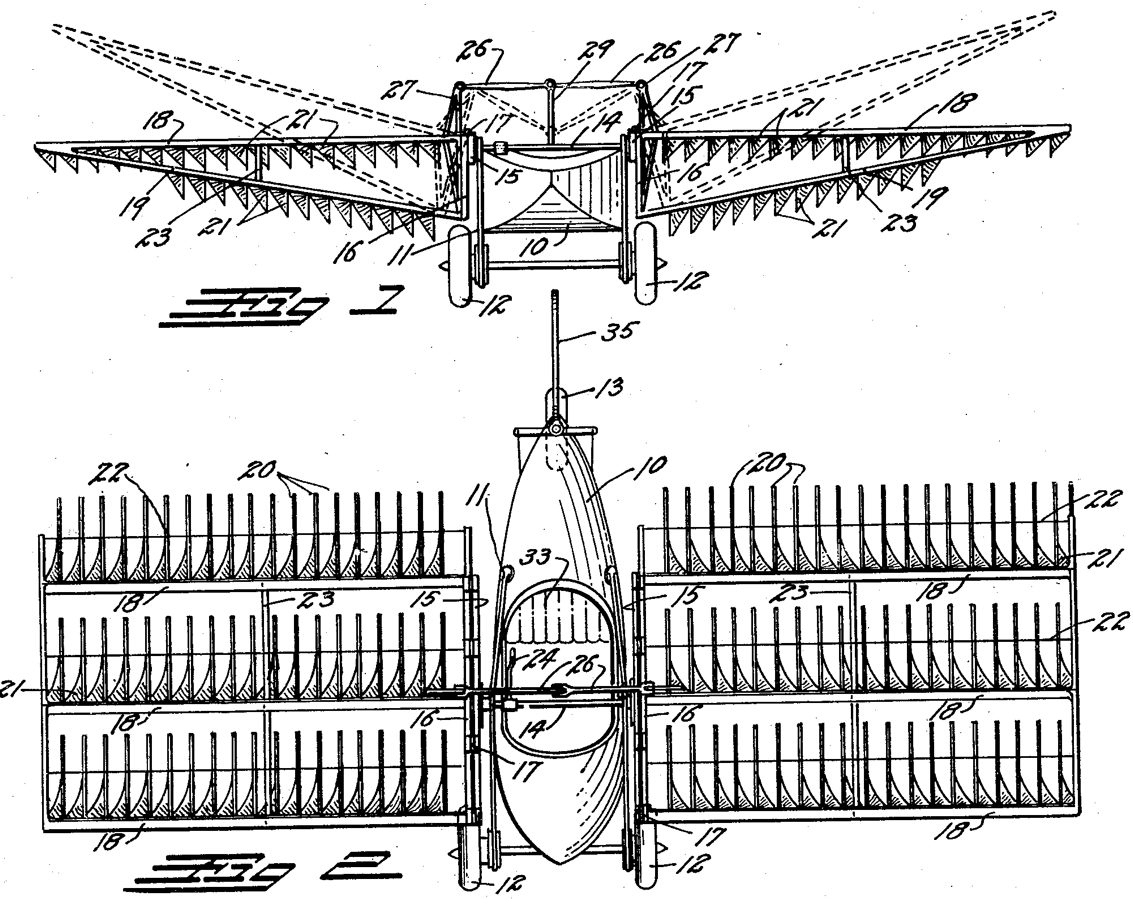
Diagram of the ornithopter design from the patent application. The wedge-shaped objects on the wings (#20) consist of the fabric "valves" (#21), which would blow closed against the supports (#20) on the downstroke.

Caldwell then turned to an even more bizarre aircraft design, an ornithopter. The wings were equipped with flexible fabric valves which were supposed to open on the upstroke and close on the downstroke, allowing it to generate lift with no forward motion and thus provide VTOL service, like the cyclogyro.

Caldwell, now living in Denver filed a patent on his new design in December 1927, which was finally granted as US1730758 in October 1929. In early 1928 he started another company in Nevada to raise funds to develop it, Gray Goose Airways, inc., issuing 10,000 shares of stock at ten cents per share, retaining a 51 percent interest. The funds were used to develop a human-powered prototype.

By 1931 there was still no working prototype, and Caldwell moved to Orangeburg, New York, and later to Madison, New Jersey. A January 14, 1932 newsreel film shows the ornithopter being readied for a test. This was apparently attempted without success, by the otherwise unknown Emile Harrier. Additional funds were then raised by another stock issue in order to build a full-sized prototype at Teterboro Airport. He also apparently restarted his cyclogyro work, and an article appeared in one of the Popular Mechanics-like magazines showing the design equipped with a V-8 engine mounted in an odd twin-fuselage with the pilot and passengers below.

Before the ornithopter prototype could be completed, the New Jersey Assistant Attorney General charged Caldwell with fraud in September. In his notes, the Attorney, Robert Grossman, noted that "no one connected with the company possessed sufficient knowledge of aeronautics to build a practical ship." Caldwell eventually reached an agreement that allowed him to continue construction of the ornithopter prototype until December, as long as no more shares of stock were sold in that time. Grossman also noted that Caldwell had begun work on yet another entirely new design, using a disk wing.

In December there was still no prototype, and Caldwell moved the company to New York. The New York Attorney General started questioning the business almost immediately.

== Autogyro ==
In 1934, Caldwell moved again, this time to Washington, DC. In a filing with the Maryland Securities and Exchange Commission he described the company as working solely on a new type of autogyro, which he referred to as a "disk-rotor plane".

The design consisted of a fairly conventional autogyro layout, but the wing was disk-like instead of the more traditional helicopter-like bladed assembly. The disk had airfoils formed out of fabric on the inside of the rim, and four small solid surfaces on the outside. In forward motion the airstream blowing across the four small surfaces would spin the disk, which would provide lift from the fabric airfoils inside. On reaching cruising altitude, the disk would be braked to stop it spinning, and unbraked again for a near-vertical landing. The advantage to this arrangement was that there was no theoretical limit on forward speed, whereas a conventional autogyro cannot be stopped in flight, and has a limit when the speed of the rearward moving blade approaches the stall speed.

Unlike his previous attempts, the disk-rotor aircraft was actually completed between 1936 and 1938, and was issued a CAA experimental registration number NX99Y. In late 1937 or early 1938, a test flight was attempted with the company mechanic at the controls, Willard Driggers. According to later claims (see below), Driggers managed to get the aircraft airborne from the Benning Race Track, and in a panic cut power, causing the aircraft to crash-land, damaging the landing gear. Although damage was minor, Caldwell had apparently already lost interest in the design and did not repair it.

== Another autogyro ==
In 1939 Caldwell shut down Grey Goose and swapped shares once again, forming Rotor Planes, Inc. His latest design retained the disk-rotor from his earlier autogyro, but replaced the fuselage with a smaller disk in the center. According to some accounts, around 1940 the Maryland securities commission also started examining Caldwell, who promptly disappeared, abandoning the broken disk-rotor and the partially completed rotorplane.

== The USAF investigates ==
In May 1949, officers of the U.S. Air Force's Project Sign received a letter from a Gray Goose shareholder, who explained that the company had been building aircraft similar to the "flying saucers" which were then a popular topic in the press. This was during the UFO craze following Kenneth Arnold's reports of seeing UFOs over Mount Rainier and the Roswell Incident that followed. The Air Force had canvassed for reports of flying saucers, and the shareholder apparently felt that Caldwell's disk-rotor might explain them.

Tracking down the leads, the team, accompanied by the Maryland Police, visited an abandoned farm in Glen Burnie, Maryland (outside Baltimore), where the damaged remains of Caldwell's disk-rotor aircraft were discovered. They also tracked down Driggers, who told them the story of the attempted flight in 1937/8. The team reported that the prototypes could not be responsible for the "flying saucer" reports that were being received from all around the country.

Photographs of the broken disk-rotor machine continue to appear in UFOs books to this day. They were often described as "crashed" flying saucers in earlier works, claiming it was one more example of the USAF being in possession of such vehicles. More recently they are normally connected with the claims that the Nazis had built working flying saucers late in the war, lumped together with other disk-shaped aircraft like the Avrocar, Sack_AS-6 and Vought V-173, in an effort to demonstrate that such aircraft were both possible and well-researched.

== Personal life ==
In 1909/10, Caldwell married Olive E. Davis. In 1930, Caldwell was living in Denver with his wife and son, Carl Davis Caldwell (July 17, 1917, Montana – November 27, 1993, Cupertino, California).

He died in 1955.
