= Challenger (Long Beach fireboat) =

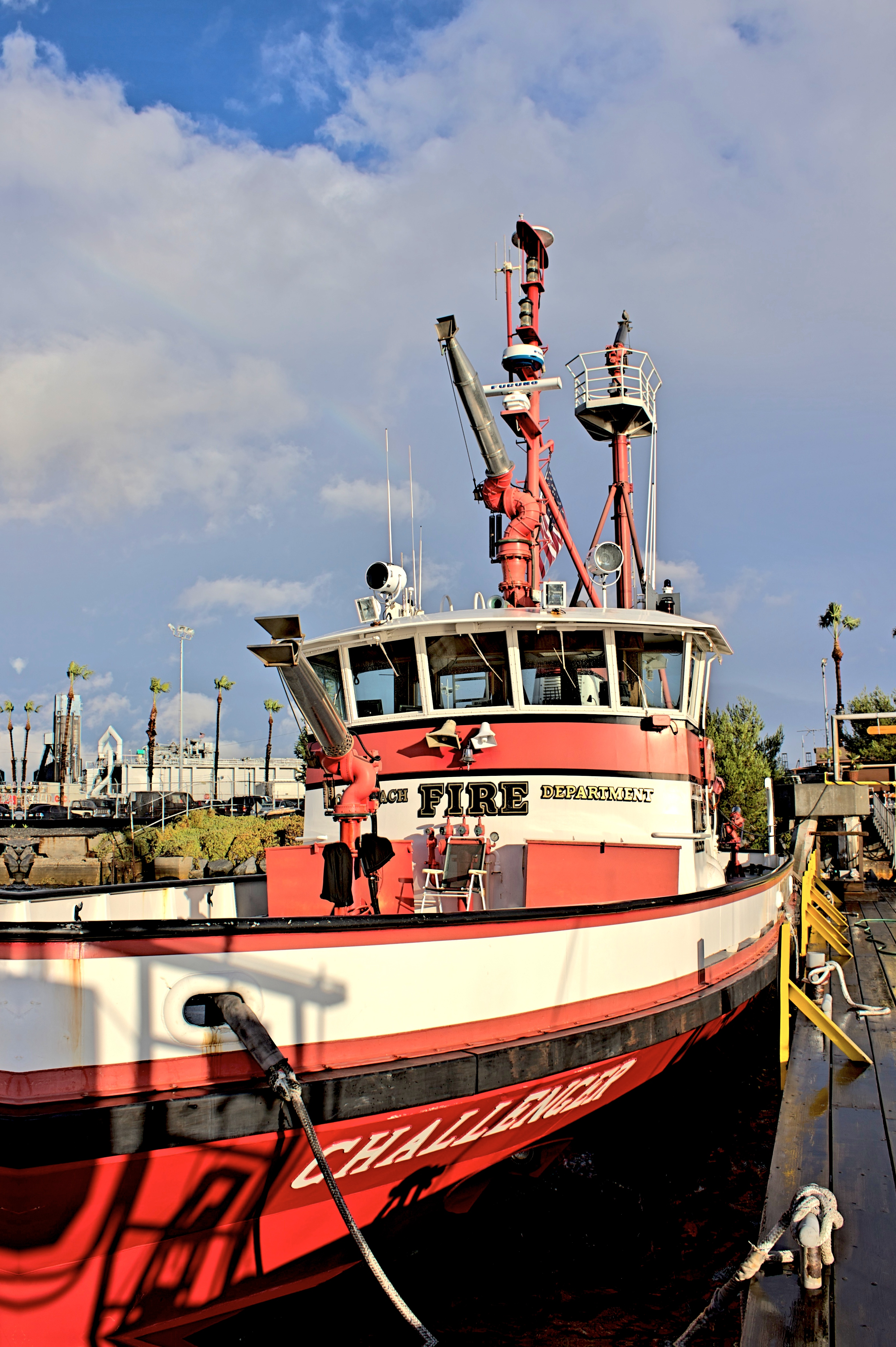

Challenger is a fireboat built for the Long Beach California Fire Department. She and her sister ship Liberty entered service in 1987. They replaced two older vessels. Within a year both vessels developed serious corrosion problems, due to poor choice of alloys, and the joints between different metals.

The Los Angeles Times reported that the vice president of Moss Point Marine, Vince Almerico, said "If the port wanted entirely rust-free vessels it could have specified use of stainless steel for everything at a much higher cost."

The vessels are 88 feet (27 m) long, and equipped with five water cannons capable of pumping water or foam at 10,000 US gallons (38,000 L; 8,300 imp gal) per minute. The two vessels cost $2.2 million each, in 1987 dollars, and, by September 1988 the Long Beach Harbor Commission had to allocate an addition $883,000 to repair the construction problems. The Challenger and the Liberty were delivered in a red livery with black trim, while the two older fireboats they replaced were grey. The maintenance problems had such a serious effect on crew morale that the Los Angeles Times reported crew members had put up a sign, saying, the city should sell the red ones and keep the grey ones. The Challenger and the Liberty were scheduled to be replaced by more modern fireboats in 2014.

== See also ==
- Fireboats of Long Beach, California
- Fireboat 20
