= Confidence (fireboat) =

Fireboat owned by San Rafael, California

The city of San Rafael, California purchased a fireboat named Confidence in 2016. The 27 feet (8.2 m) boat built in 2003 was purchased for $50,000, from San Juan Island, Washington, by the San Rafael Fire Foundation, a local charity. The Foundation then donated the vessel to the city.

In 2020, San Rafael purchased a new boat Fireboat San Rafael, with Confidence being sold to the Berkeley Fire Department as the agency's first fully equipped fire suppression watercraft.

She was built in 2003, arrived in California in October 2016, and underwent maintenance. Testing and training began in March 2017, and she first went into service in May 2017. She is currently in service out of the Berkeley Marina as a resource of the Berkeley Fire Department performing search and rescue, as well as fighting fires.

== Operational career ==
The Confidence was deployed on December 11, 2018, following an industrial accident on East Marin Island, part of the Marin Islands National Wildlife Refuge, located off San Rafael Bay. Construction worker Shawn Frederick Moore was buried in rubble when a retaining wall collapsed. Firefighters were able to unearth his body, but he had already died.
