= Cyclorotor =

Perpendicular-axis marine propulsion system

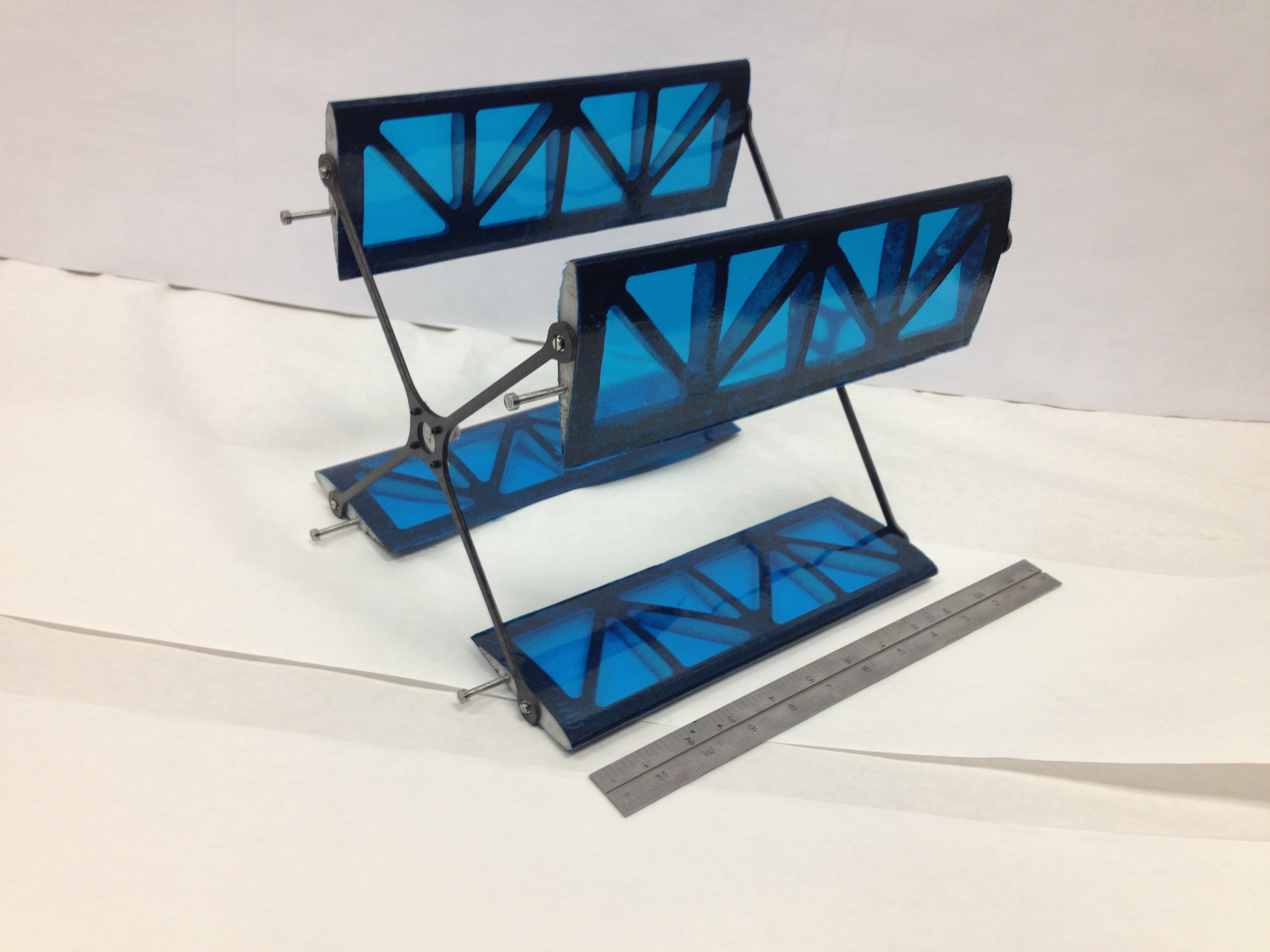
Cyclorotor before installation on small-scale cyclogyro

A cyclorotor, cycloidal rotor, cycloidal propeller or cyclogiro, is a fluid propulsion device that converts shaft power into the acceleration of a fluid using a rotating axis perpendicular to the direction of fluid motion. It uses several blades with a spanwise axis parallel to the axis of rotation and perpendicular to the direction of fluid motion. These blades are cyclically pitched twice per revolution to produce force (thrust or lift) in any direction normal to the axis of rotation. Cyclorotors are used for propulsion, lift, and control on air and water vehicles. An aircraft using cyclorotors as the primary source of lift, propulsion, and control is known as a cyclogyro or cyclocopter. A unique aspect is that it can change the magnitude and direction of thrust without the need of tilting any aircraft structures. The patented application, used on ships with particular actuation mechanisms both mechanical or hydraulic, is a Voith Schneider Propeller.

== Operating principle ==
A cyclorotor generates thrust by altering the pitch of the blade as it transits around the rotor.

The blades revolve around the central axis while individually cycling back and forth to engage (creating driving force) and disengage (to avoid creating drag). By adjusting their angle-of-attack they maximize the net force. This joint action generates a higher thrust at low speed than any other propeller design.

In aircraft hover, the blades adjust to a positive pitch (sharp edge facing outward from the centre of the rotor) on the upper half of their revolution and a negative pitch (sharp edge inward) over the lower half inducing a net upward aerodynamic force and opposite fluid downwash. By varying the phase of this pitch the force can be shifted to any angle. Increasing the pitching kinematics amplitude magnifies thrust.

Cyclorotors are an application of the Magnus effect.

=== Magnus effect ===
The Magnus effect is a phenomenon that occurs when a spinning object is moving through a fluid. A lift force acts on the spinning object and its path may be deflected in a manner not present when it is not spinning. The strength and direction of the Magnus force is dependent on the speed and direction of the rotation of the object.

The Magnus effect is named after Heinrich Gustav Magnus, the German physicist who investigated it. The force on a rotating cylinder is an example of Kutta–Joukowski lift, named after Martin Kutta and Nikolay Zhukovsky (or Joukowski), mathematicians who contributed to the knowledge of how lift is generated in a fluid flow.

== History ==
=== Samoljot ===
The cyclorotor propeller emerged in Russian aeronautics. Sverchkov's "Samoljot" (St. Petersburg, 1909) or "wheel orthopter" is the first vehicle thought to have used this system. Its scheme came near to cyclogiro, but is difficult to precisely classify. It had three flat surfaces and a rudder; the rear edge of one surface could be bent, replacing the action of an elevator. Lift and thrust had to be created by paddle wheels consisting of 12 blades, set in pairs at a 120° angle. The blades were concave. The angle of incidence was controlled by eccentrics and springs.

At the bottom of the craft a 10 horsepower engine was arranged. Transmission was by belt. The empty weight was about 200 kg. It was constructed by military engineer E.P. Sverchkov under the Main Engineering Agency. It was demonstrated at the Newest Inventions Exhibition and won a medal. However, it could not pass preliminary flight tests.

In 1914, Russian inventor and scientist A.N. Lodygin proposed a cyclogiro-like aircraft, similar to Samoljot, but the project was not carried out.

=== Adolph Rohrbach ===
In 1933, Adolf Rohrbach experimented in Germany with a paddle wheel wing arrangement. Oscillating winglets cycled from positive to negative angles of attack during each revolution, and their eccentric mounting could, in theory, produce nearly any combination of horizontal and vertical forces. The DVL evaluated Rohrbach's design, but the aviation journals of the time cast doubt on the design preventing funding, even with a proposal as a Luftwaffe transport aircraft. No evidence indicates that this design was ever built. Platt in the US designed by 1933 his own independent Cyclogyro, based on Rohrbach's work. His arrangement was awarded a US patent (one of many similar patents), and underwent extensive wind-tunnel testing at MIT in 1927. Despite this, Platt's aircraft was never built.

=== Voith-Schneider ===
The first functional design was developed at Voith in the 1930s. Its origins date to the decision of the Voith company to focus on turbine transmission gear assemblies. The Voight propeller was invented by Ernst Schneider and enhanced by Voith. It was launched as the Voith-Schneider Propeller (VSP) for commercial marine vessels. It significantly improved ship manoeuvrability as demonstrated in sea trials on the test boat Torqueo, in 1937. The first Voith Schneider Propellers were put to work in the canals of Venice, Italy. During the 1937 World Fair in Paris, Voith was awarded the grand prize – three times – for its propellers and turbo-transmissions. A year later, two of Paris' fire-fighting boats started operating with the system.

In 2025, ABB announced its Dynafin cyclorotor system, which promises up to 85% efficiency and precise maneuvering. Dynafin follows the Azipod system introduced in the 1990s. The Dynafin uses an electric motor to rotate a disc on the underside of a ship or boat, which spins at between 40 and 80 RPM. Five independently controllable blades are mounted at equal intervals on the disc. The record efficiency could allow the use of more compact propulsion systems. The relatively low-pressure pulses and blade-tip speeds create less turbulence than conventional props. Independent testing reported that Dynafin managed energy savings of 22% compared to conventional configurations. The concept was evaluated on the Carlton Ilma cruise yacht, saving power, weight and space.

== Design ==
=== Thrust vectoring ===
Cyclorotors can quickly vector thrust by altering the pattern of blade pitching

Cyclorotors provide a high degree of control. Traditional propellers, rotors, and jet engines produce thrust only along their axis of rotation and require redirecting the entire device to alter the thrust direction. This realignment requires large forces and comparatively long time scales since the propeller inertia is considerable, and the rotor gyroscopic forces resist rotation. For many practical applications (helicopters, airplanes, ships) this requires rotating the entire vessel. In contrast, cyclorotors need to vary only the blade pitch. Since little inertia is associated with blade pitch change, thrust vectoring in the plane perpendicular to the axis of rotation is rapid and efficient.

=== Advance ratio thrust and symmetric lift ===
Cyclorotors can produce lift and thrust at high advance ratios, which, in theory, enable a cyclogyro to fly at much faster subsonic speeds than single rotor helicopters.

Forward speed of single rotor helicopters is limited by a combination of retreating blade stall and sonic blade tip constraints. As helicopters fly forward, the tip of the advancing blade experiences wind velocity that is the sum of the helicopter forward speed and the rotational speed. This value cannot exceed the speed of sound if the rotor is to remain efficient and quiet.

Keeping the rotational speed down avoids this problem, but presents another. In the traditional method of the composition of velocity the wind velocity seen by the retreating blade is the vector composition of the blade rotation velocity and the freestream velocity. In this condition in the presence of a sufficiently high advance ratio the air velocity on the retreating blade is low. The flapping of the blade changes the angle of attack. It is then possible for the blade to reach the stall condition. In this case the stalling blade must increase the pitch angle to maintain lift. This constrains the wing profile and requires careful dimensioning of the rotor radius for the specified speed range.

Slow speed cyclorotors avoid this problem by switching the rotation axis to horizontal and operating at a lower blade tip speed. For higher speeds it is necessary to adopt more sophisticated strategies. One approach is to independently actuate the blades via hydraulic actuation. The horizontal axis of rotation always advances the upper blades that always produce a positive lift by the full rotor. These characteristics could help overcome helicopter's low energy efficiency and the advance ratio constraint.

=== Aerodynamics ===
The revolving and oscillating blades are the cyclorotor's two dynamic actions, generating complex aerodynamic phenomena:

- delaying the blade stall;
- increasing the maximum blade lift coefficient at low Reynolds numbers.

The two effects are correlated with increasing thrust. Compared to a helicopter or any other propeller, the same blade crossection in a cyclorotor produces much more thrust at the same Reynolds number. This effect can be explained by considering traditional propeller behavior.

At low Reynolds numbers little turbulence is present and laminar flow conditions can be achieved. A traditional wing profile minimizes the speed difference between upper and lower face of the wing, reducing both lift and stall speed. A consequence is a reduction of stall condition attack angle.

In this regime, conventional propellers and rotors must use larger blade areas and rotate faster to achieve the same propulsive forces, while losing more energy to blade drag. Thus, a cyclorotor is more energy efficient than any other propeller.

Cyclorotors quickly increase and decrease blade attack angle, which delays stall and achieves lift. This unsteady lift makes cyclorotors more efficient at small scales, low velocities, and high altitudes than traditional propellers. However, birds and some insects are still much more efficient, because they can change both the pitch and the shape of their wings, or the boundary layer (as in sharkskin).

Research aims for the same level of efficiency of wings or surfaces. One direction is morphing wings. Another relates to the introduction of boundary layer control mechanisms, such as dielectric barrier discharge.

=== Noise ===
During experimental evaluation, cyclorotors produced little aerodynamic noise, credited to lower blade tip speeds, which produce lower intensity turbulence.

=== Hover thrust efficiency ===
In tests, cyclorotors achieved higher power loading than comparable traditional rotors at the same disk loading. This is attributed to utilizing unsteady lift and consistent blade aerodynamic conditions. The rotational velocity component on propellers increases from root to tip and requires blade chord, twist, airfoil, etc., to vary along the blade. Since the cyclorotor blade span is parallel to the axis of rotation, each spanwise blade section operates at similar velocities and the entire blade can be optimized.

=== Structural considerations ===
Cyclorotor blades require a support structure. This structure, sometimes referred to as "spokes," adds to parasite drag and rotor weight. Cyclorotor blades are centrifugally loaded in bending (as opposed to the axial loading on propellers), which requires high strength-to-weight ratio blades or intermediate support spokes. Early 20th century cyclorotors featured short blade spans, or additional support.

=== Blade pitch considerations ===
Cyclorotors require continuously actuated blade pitch. The relative flow angle experienced by the blades as they revolve varies with advance ratio and rotor thrust. To operate efficiently a blade pitch mechanism must adjust for these diverse flow angles. High rotational velocities makes it difficult to implement an actuator-based mechanism. A fixed or variable shape track can supply pitch control when mounted parallel to blade trajectory. The pitch control track shape reliably determines blade's pitch along the orbit regardless of RPM. While the pitching motions used in hover are not optimized for forward flight, in experimental evaluation they were reported to provide efficient flight up to an advance ratio near one.

== Applications ==
=== Wind turbines ===
Wind turbines are a potential application. Labeled variable-pitch vertical-axis wind turbines, they offer benefits with respect to traditional VAWTs. This kind of turbine is stated to overcome most of the traditional limitations of traditional Darrieus VAWTs.

=== Ship propulsion and control ===
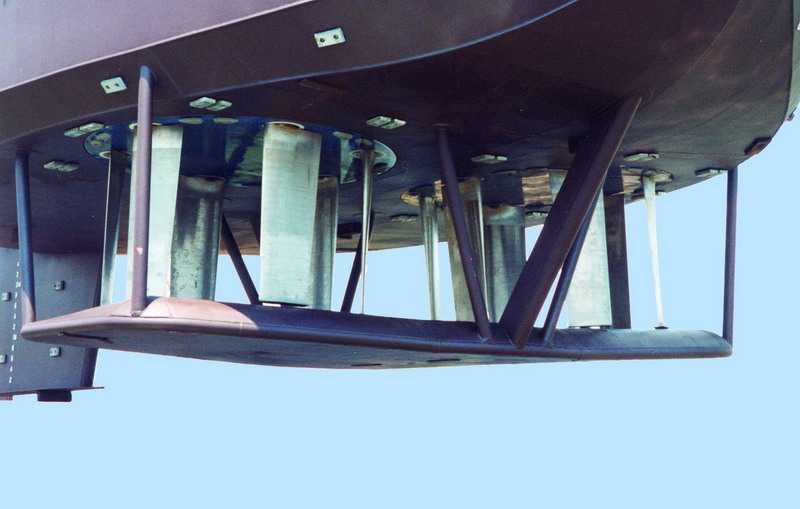
Twin Voith Schneider propeller with thrust plate on a tug's hull

The largest potential application of cyclorotors is ship propulsion and control. The cyclorotor is mounted with a vertical axis of rotation so that thrust can be vectored in any direction parallel to the water surface. In 1922, Frederick Kirsten fitted a pair of cyclorotors to a 32 ft boat, which eliminated the need for a rudder and provided greater manoeuvrability. While the idea floundered in the United States after the Kirsten-Boeing Propeller Company lost a US Navy research grant, the Voith-Schneider propeller company successfully deployed the propeller. This propeller was fitted to more than 100 ships prior to the outbreak of the Second World War. Today, the same company sells this type of propeller. It is applied on offshore drilling ships, tugboats, and ferries.

=== Aircraft ===
==== Cyclogyros ====
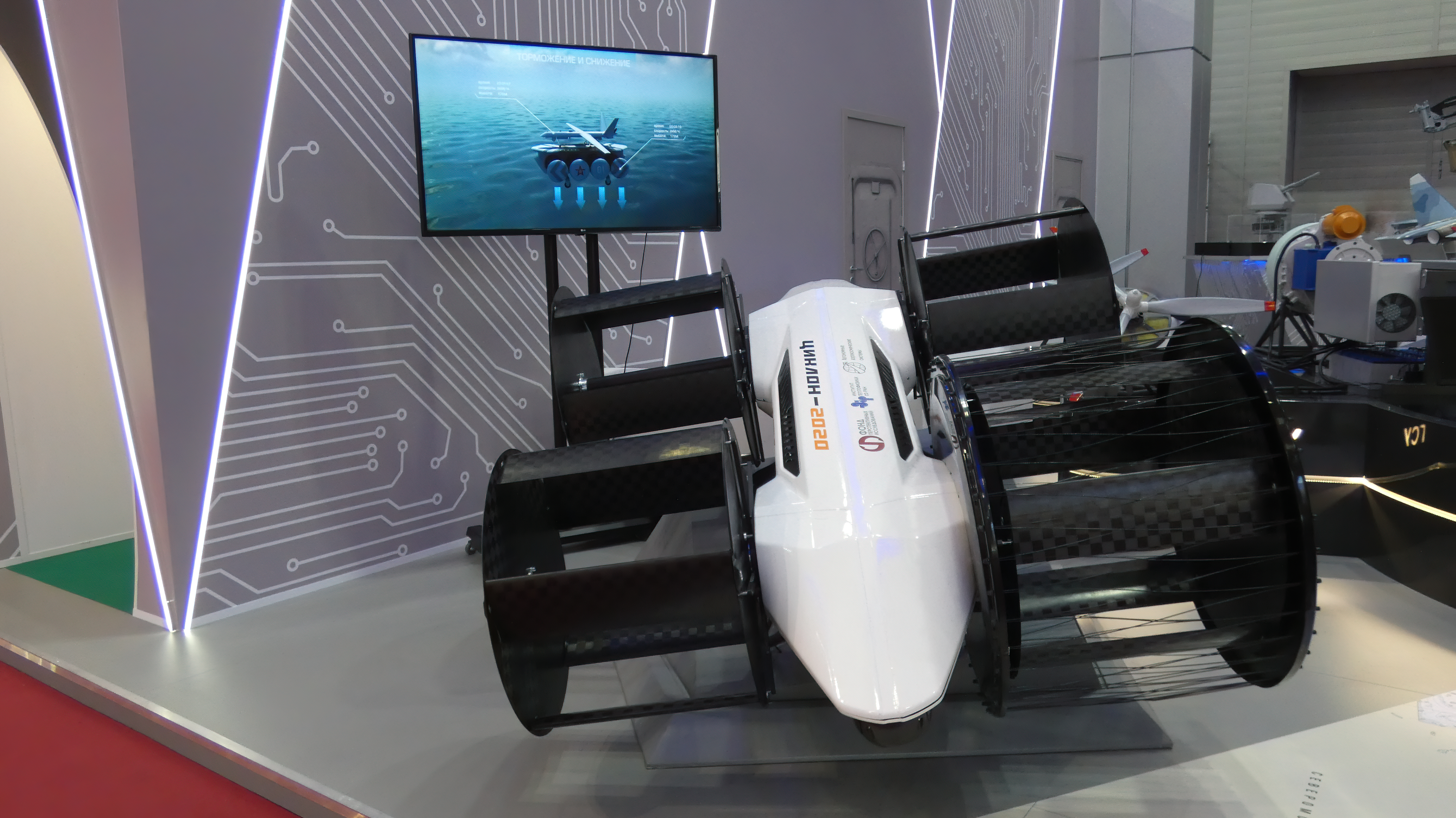
Cyclone-2020 during the Armiya 2021 exhibition

Concept drawing of a cyclogyro

The cyclogyro (cyclocopter) is an aircraft configuration that uses a horizontal-axis cyclorotor as a rotor wing to provide lift and, sometimes, also propulsion and control. In principle, the cyclogyro is capable of vertical take off and landing and hovering performance, like a helicopter, while potentially benefiting from some of the advantages of a fixed-wing aircraft.

The first untethered model cyclogyro flight came in 2011 at China's Northwestern Polytechnic Institute.

The performance of traditional rotors deteriorates at low Reynolds Numbers by low angle-of-attack blade stall. Current hover-capable MAVs can stay aloft for minutes. Cyclorotor MAVs (very small scale cyclogyros) could utilize unsteady lift to extend endurance. The smallest cyclogyro flown to date weighs 29 grams and was developed by the vertical flight laboratory at Texas A&M University.

Commercial cyclogyro UAVs are under development by D-Daelus, Pitch Aeronautics, and CycloTech.

Concept drawing of a cyclogyro

==== EVTOLs ====
CycloTech is also developing Cyclorotor-powered EVTOls. Its Blackbird prototype uses one barrel-shaped cyclorotor motor at each corner, with two others at the front and rear mounted at right angles to increase thrust, maneuverability, and redundancy. The barrels rotate at constant speed, with propulsion controlled by the blades attached to the barrel's inner surface. Thrust can be quickly vectored with 360-degree freedom. Its first flight test came in April 2025.

==== Airships ====
A large exposed area makes airships susceptible to gusts and difficult to maneuver in windy conditions. Propelling airships with cyclorotors could compensate for gusts with rapid thrust vectoring. Accordingly, the US Navy considered fitting six primitive Kirsten-Boeing cyclorotors to the USS Shenandoah airship. The Shenandoah crashed while transiting a squall line on 3 September 1925 before installation and testing. No large scale tests have been attempted since, but a 20 m (66 ft) cyclorotor airship demonstrated improved performance over a traditional airship configuration in a 2009 test.

== See also ==
- Cycloid – Curve traced by a point on a rolling circle
- Cyclogyro – Aircraft configuration that uses a horizontal-axis cyclorotor as a rotor wing
- Helicopter rotor – Aircraft component
- Voith Schneider Propeller – Proprietary marine propulsion system
