= Fireboats of San Diego =

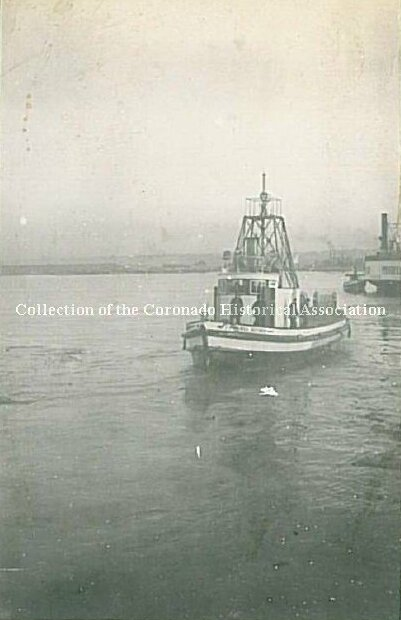
San Diego's first fireboat, the Bill Kettner.

Fireboats in San Diego have been operated on San Diego Bay in the San Diego, California, area since the early 20th century, as well as by the Port of San Diego since its creation as a quasi-governmental agency serving the entire bay in 1962.

== City of San Diego Fire-Rescue Department ==
The city's first fireboat, the Bill Kettner, was named after San Diego's Congressional Representative William Kettner. The vessel was built by the city's own firefighters in their own workshop. She was commissioned in 1919.

The Point Loma II, a small patrol vessel with a modest pumping capacity, served from 1957 to 1977. She had a single water cannon, only capable of pumping 1,200 gallons per hour.

The Bill Kettner was retired in 1961, when she was replaced by the Shelter Island. The Shelter Island had two water cannon, capable of pumping 2,000 gallons per minute and 1,000 gallons per minute. A third vessel, the Harbor Island, was also put into service. She had a single water cannon, capable of pumping 2000 gallons per minute. Shelter Island and Harbor Island are named after "islands" (actually peninsulas) in San Diego Bay.

On June 26, 2015, a new high speed vessel christened the Marine 3 began operation by the San Diego Lifeguard Department. San Diego Lifeguard Services is a unit of the San Diego Fire-Rescue Department. The vessel is equipped for both search and rescue and firefighting duties. It is equipped with infrared and other sensors, for helping to find missing sailors and lost boats. The two water cannon, each capable of pumping 12,000 gallons per minute, can be remotely controlled from the cabin. The lifeguard department's previous rescue and fire vessel had just a single water cannon, capable of pumping only 500 gallons per minute. The vessel cost $1 million, and its projected life is 25 years.

== San Diego Harbor Police ==
The San Diego Harbor Police is the law enforcement authority for the Port of San Diego. It provides uniformed police services as well as marine firefighting. The department has an area of responsibility that includes San Diego Bay shorelines of the cities of San Diego, National City, Chula Vista, Imperial Beach, and Coronado. Harbor Police officers are cross-trained in law enforcement and firefighting.

On November 22, 2010, the city accepted two new fireboats, to be operated by the San Diego Harbor Police, that were paid for by a port security grant from the federal Department of Homeland Security. The two new vessels each have three water cannon. They replaced three older and less capable vessels, that had been in service for 35 years. In 2011 the City of San Diego agreed to accept three more vessels, under another grant from the Department of Homeland Security. The five identical vessels are MetalCraft FireStorm 36 fireboats and are capable of approximately 2,200 gallons per minute.
