= Bill Kettner (fireboat) =

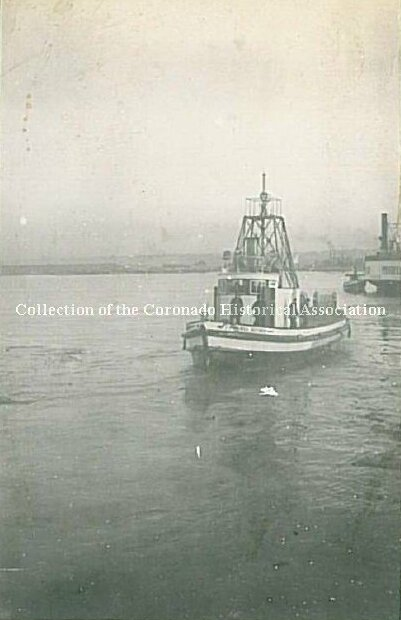
San Diego's first fireboat, the Bill Kettner.

The Bill Kettner was San Diego, California's first fireboat. She was a 59 feet (18 m) and staffed by a crew of seven. She was named after William Kettner, who was then San Diego's Congressional Representative.

The San Diego fire department's history asserts that the Bill Kettner was the first gasoline-powered fireboat in the world. Her pumps could project 6000 gallons per minute. She served from 1919 to 1961.

The vessel was wooden-hulled.

== See also ==
- Fireboats in San Diego
