= Army (International Military-Technical Forum) =

Annual arms trade show in Russia

International Military-Technical Forum
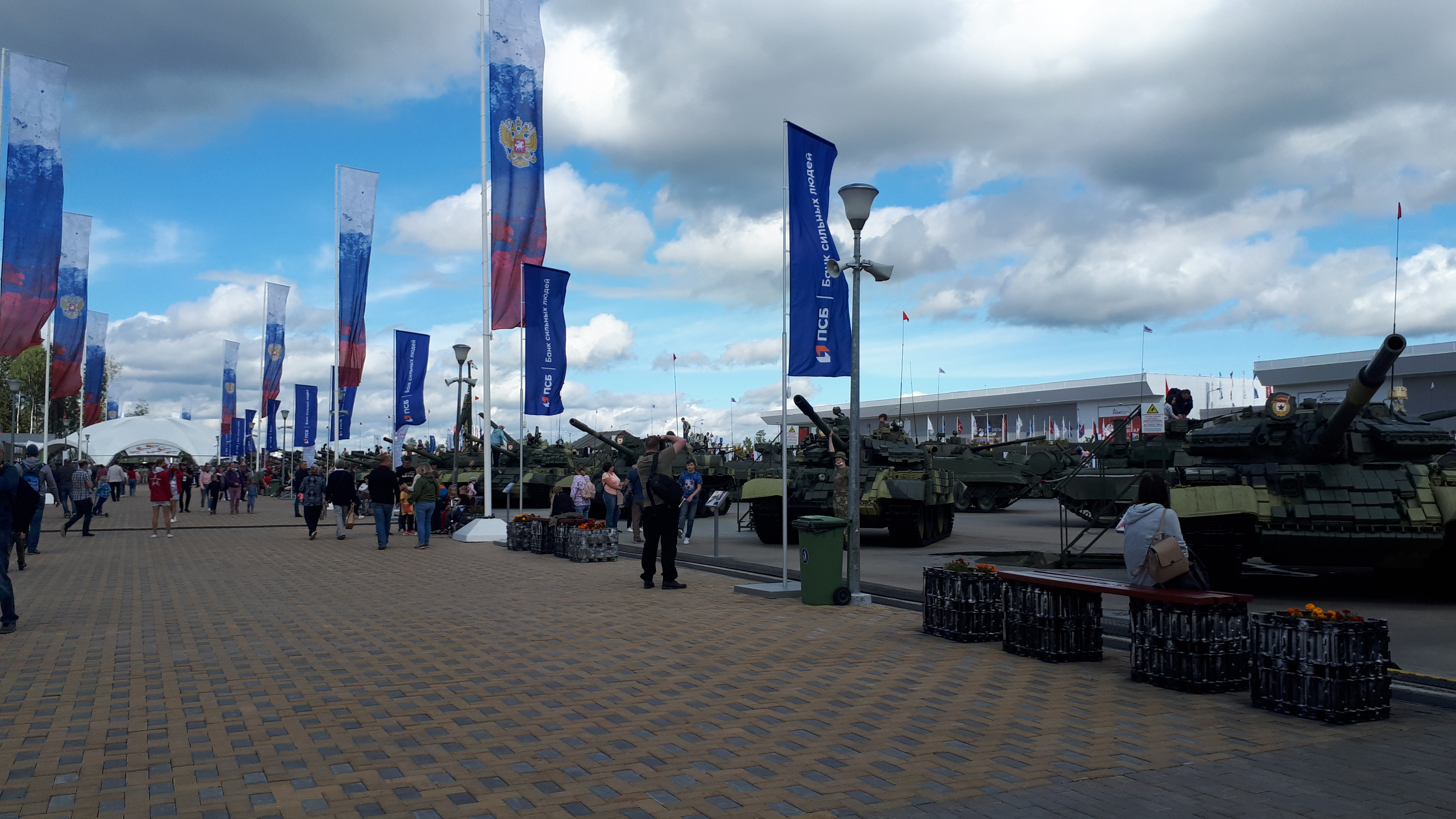
- Genre: Defense
- Venue: Patriot Park
- Location: Moscow Oblast
- Country: Russian Federation
- Inaugurated: 2015
- Next event: August 2025.
- Attendance: 1,000,000 (2020)
- Organizer: Ministry of Defence (Russia)
- Website: rusarmyexpo.com

The "Army" or "Armiya" International Military-Technical Forum (Russian: Международный военно-технический форум «Армия») is an annual trade show for the arms industry held in Russia since 2015 by the Russian Ministry of Defence. Attending representatives of governments and businesses exhibit and demonstrate military technology, advertise services, negotiate sales, and discuss all aspects of the industry.

== 2020 ==
- At the end of July 2020, a senior Defence Ministry official stated that, due to travel and planning disruptions resulting from the COVID-19 pandemic, only 35 states out of 133 invited had confirmed their intent to participate in Army 2020.
- Almost 1,500 defense industry organizations took part in the forum, presenting over 28,000 exhibits.
- Rostec presented over 1100 inventions in 2020.
- Ruselectronics Group Sozvezdiye unveiled the fifth generation of the R-176-1AE radio station, which serves as a component of mobile long-range communications radio center used by the Russian Armed Forces.

== 2021 ==
- In 2021, the forum was held from the 22nd to the 28th of August.
- The Russian Ministry of Defence (MO) signed 41 contracts worth RUB500 billion (US$8.3 billion) with 27 defense enterprises during Army 2021 for the delivery of 1,300 new weapon systems and the refurbishment of 150 existing systems, while Rostec's Rosoboronexport arms exporter signed deals worth EUR2 billion (US$2.04 billion) with China on seaborne hardware, with India on land forces’ equipment and also with Armenia, Uzbekistan, Myanmar and Belarus.
- The Military Technopolis "Era" presented a working model of electric transport developed for the Armed Forces of the Russian Federation - the "ERA" electric vehicle.
- Nearly 100 countries participated in Army 2021.

== 2023 ==
In 2023, the forum was held from August 14 to August 20. On weekdays, the exhibition was open to potential buyers. Over the weekend, the forum was open to civilians.

== 2024 ==
- In 2024, the forum was held from August 12 to August 14. The Russian Ministry of Defence (MO) signed contracts worth almost RUB500 billion (about US$5.5 billion) during Army 2024 for the delivery of over 500 basic weapons systems and more than one million munitions. More than 1,000 defense industry organizations took part in the forum, presenting over 20,000 exhibits.
- Belarusian enterprises signed contracts worth $100mln.

== Photo gallery ==
Vehicles exhibited at Army IMTF
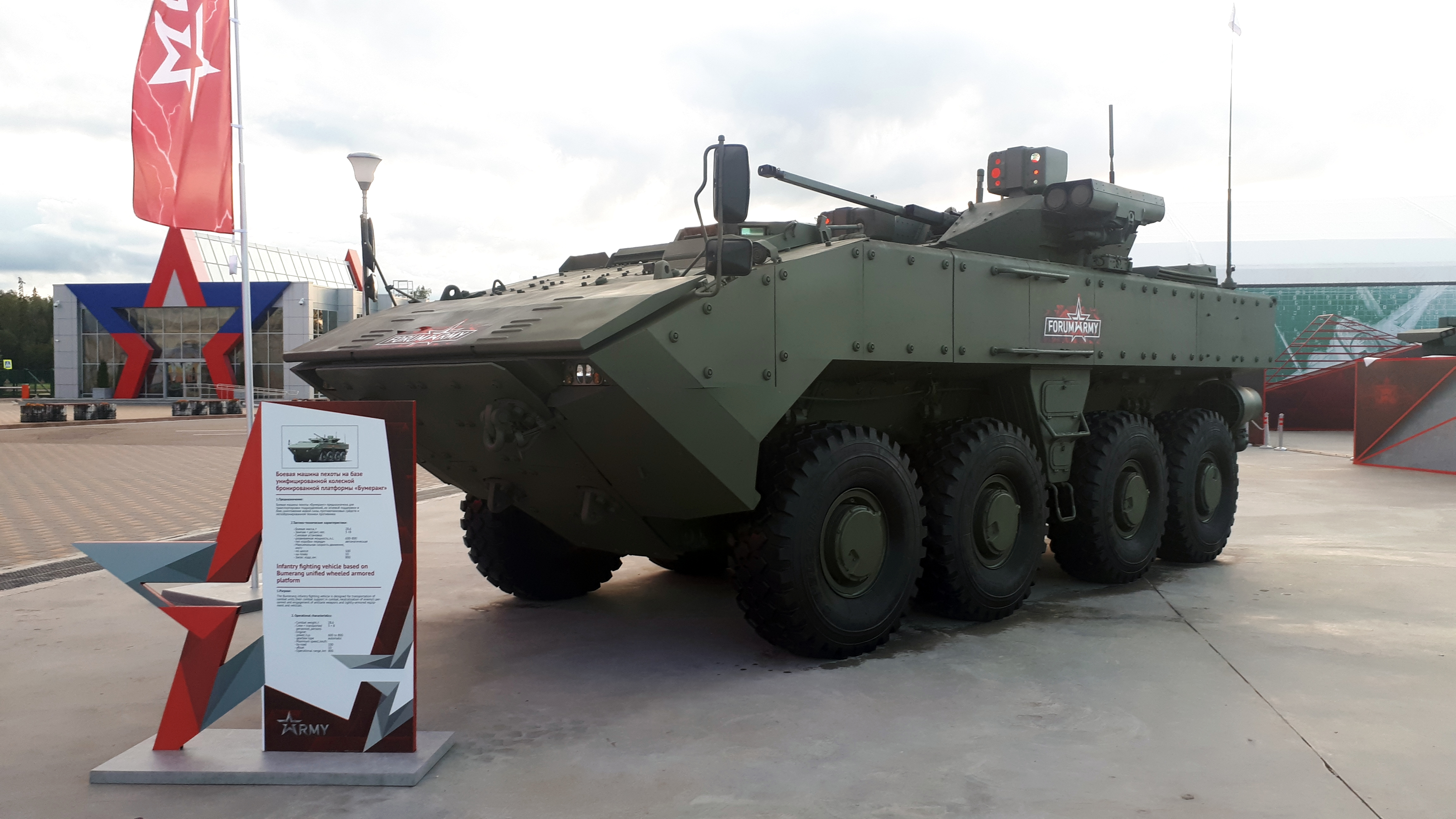
VPK-7829 Bumerang exhibited at Army 2020

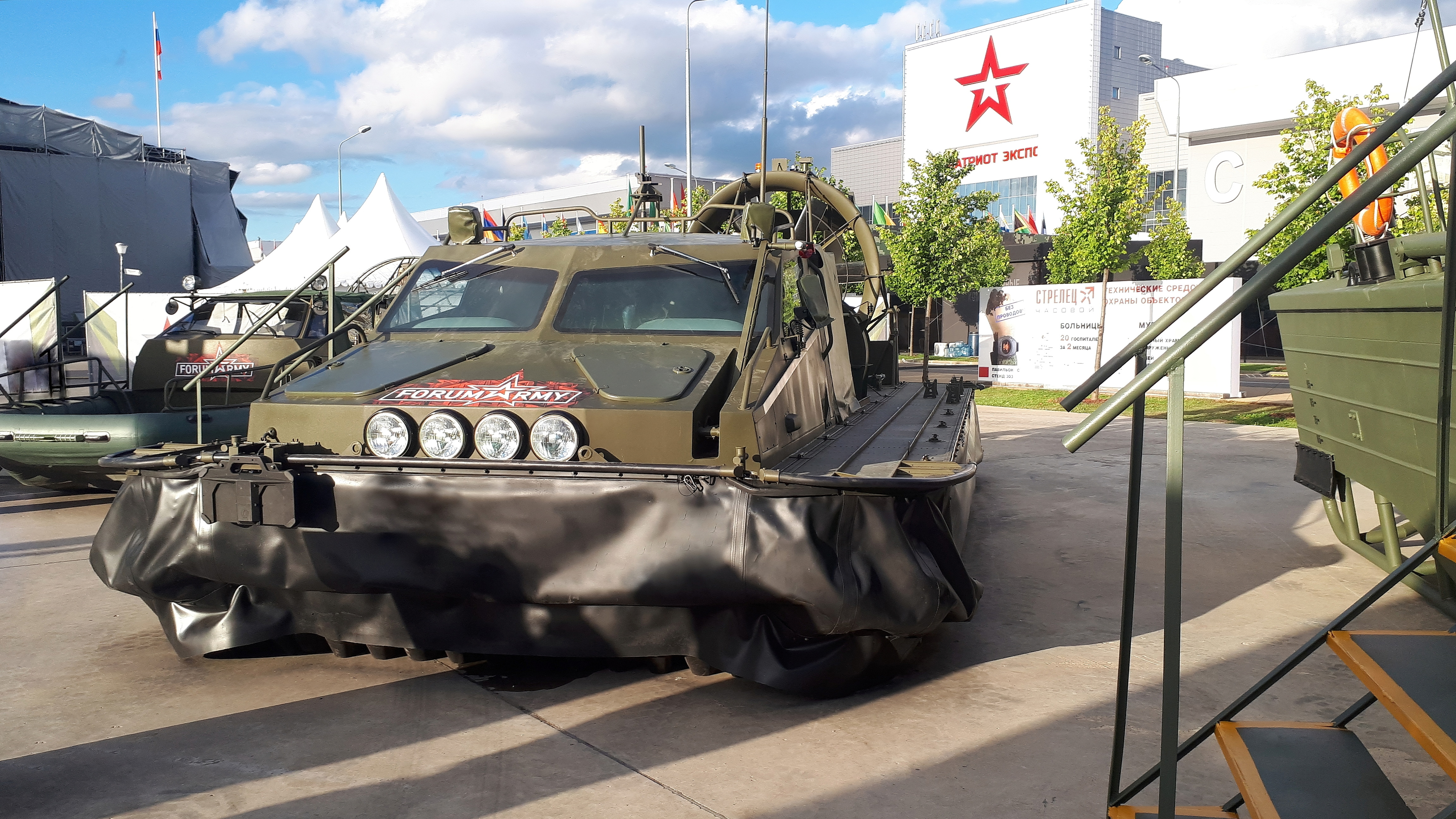
Russian engineer reconnaissance hovercraft (инженерный разведывательный катер) at Army 2020

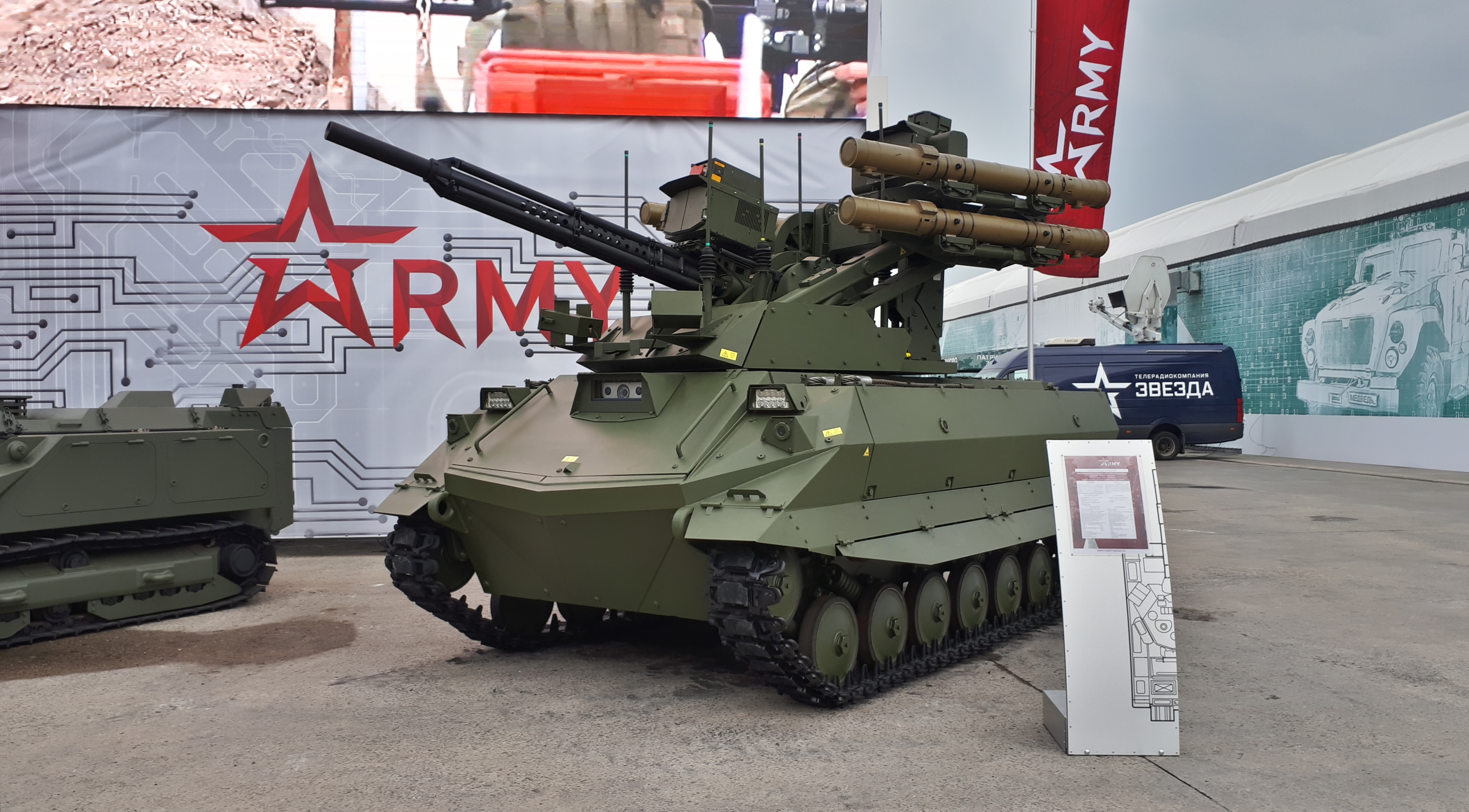
Uran-9 unmanned combat ground vehicle (UCGV) at Army 2021

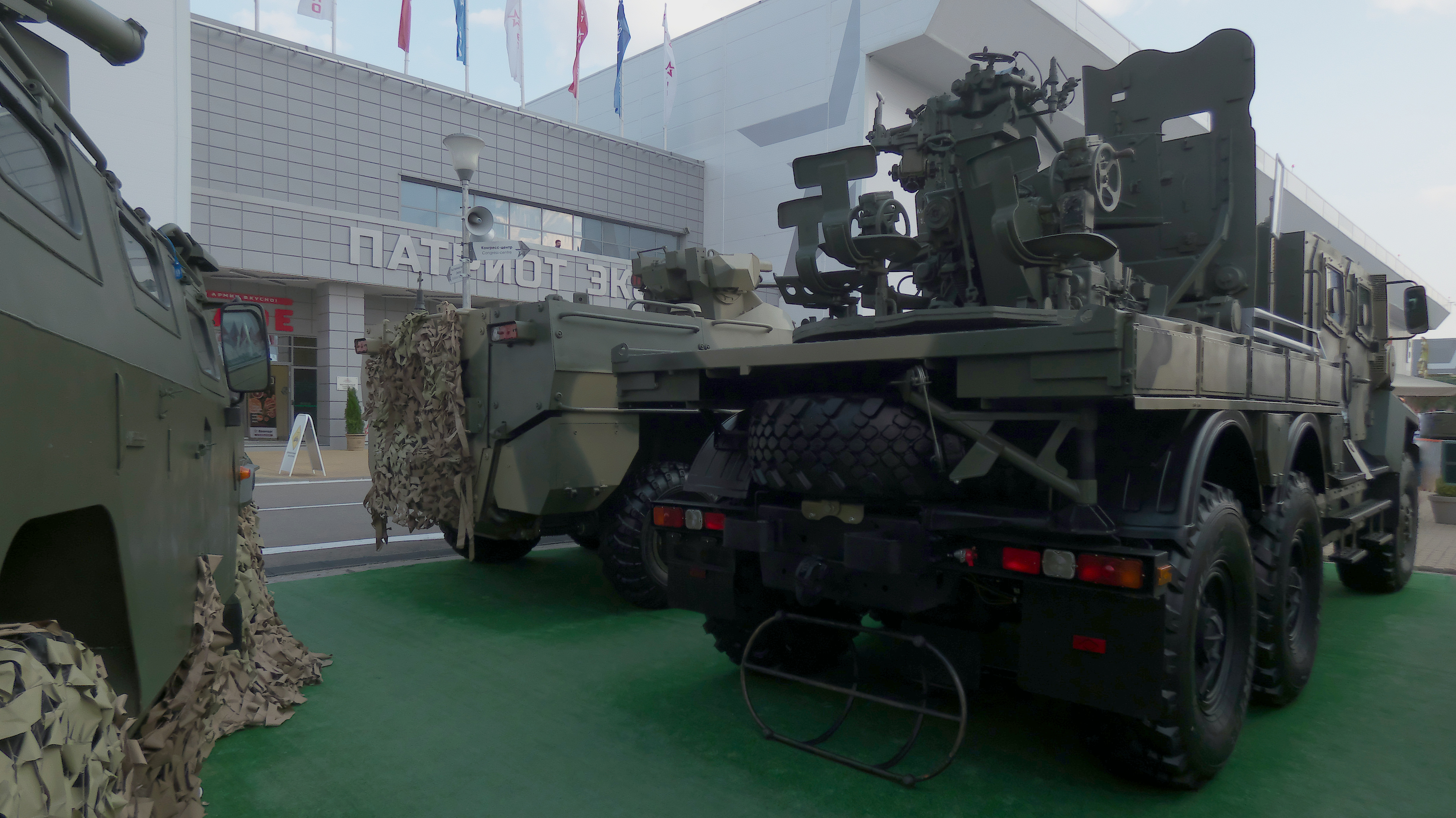
Heavy AZP S-60 cannon on truck chassis at Army 2023
