= Fireboats of San Francisco =

As a major port a number of fireboats of San Francisco have been operated by the city of San Francisco since 1878.

fireboats of San Francisco
image	name	entered service	retired	notes
	Governor Irwin	1878	1909	Participated in 1906 San Francisco earthquake and fire.; The Governor Irwin was owned by the State of California, she could only pump a modest 1000 gallons per minute.
	Governor Markham	1895		Participated in 1906 San Francisco earthquake and fire.; Sister ship to the Governor Irwin.
	David Scannell	1909	1954	Steam powered.
	Dennis T. Sullivan	1909	1954	Steam powered.; Active during World War II, when she fought a fire on Angel Island.
	Frank G. White	1947	1978	A tugboat with fire-fighting capability, which would be called into service for particularly serious fires, or when the full-time fireboats were undergoing maintenance.
	Phoenix	1955		Was scheduled to be retired, as a cost-saving measure, but was still in service when the San Francisco area was hit by the 1989 Loma Prieta earthquake.; Remains in service.
	Guardian	1990		The Guardian was donated to the city by private citizens after the 1989 Loma Prieta earthquake. The pumps of the Phoenix played a key role in fire prevention in areas where the earthquake had broken water mains.; The vessel had previously served in Vancouver, British Columbia.
	St. Francis	2016		In October 2014, San Francisco started building a modern fireboat.; Is capable of pumping 18,000 gallons per minute through five water cannons.; She will be equipped with a stern launch ramp, similar to those US Coast Guard cutters use to deploy pursuit boats to capture smugglers.; One of the department's older fireboats may be retired when the new vessel enters service.

United States Navy fireboats USS Leslie, USS Fortune and USS Active were employed to fight the fires triggered in the aftermath of the disastrous 1906 San Francisco earthquake. These vessels were not operated by the San Francisco Fire Department, which did not have any active fireboats at the time of the disaster.
