= Pier 35 =

Pier 35 may refer to:

- Pier 35 (San Francisco), USA
- Pier 35 (Manhattan), New York City, USA
- Pier 35 (Port Melbourne), Australia
