= David Scannell =

David Scannell may refer to:

- David John Scannell (1875–1923), US marine who was awarded the Medal of Honor
- David S. Scannell (1820–1893), San Francisco's first professional Fire Chief
- David Scannell (fireboat), a fireboat operated by San Francisco from 1909 to 1954
