= Governor Irwin =

Governor Irwin may refer to:

- Jared Irwin (1750–1818), 22nd and 26th Governor of Georgia
- John Irwin (British Army officer) (1727–1788), Governor of Gibraltar from 1765 to 1767 and Governor of Londonderry 1775 to 1776
- John N. Irwin (died 1905), 9th Governor of Idaho Territory
- William Irwin (California politician) (1827–1886), 13th Governor of California

== See also ==
- Governor Irwin (fireboat), served in San Francisco from 1878 to 1909
