= Phoenix (fireboat) =

Fireboat owned by State of California

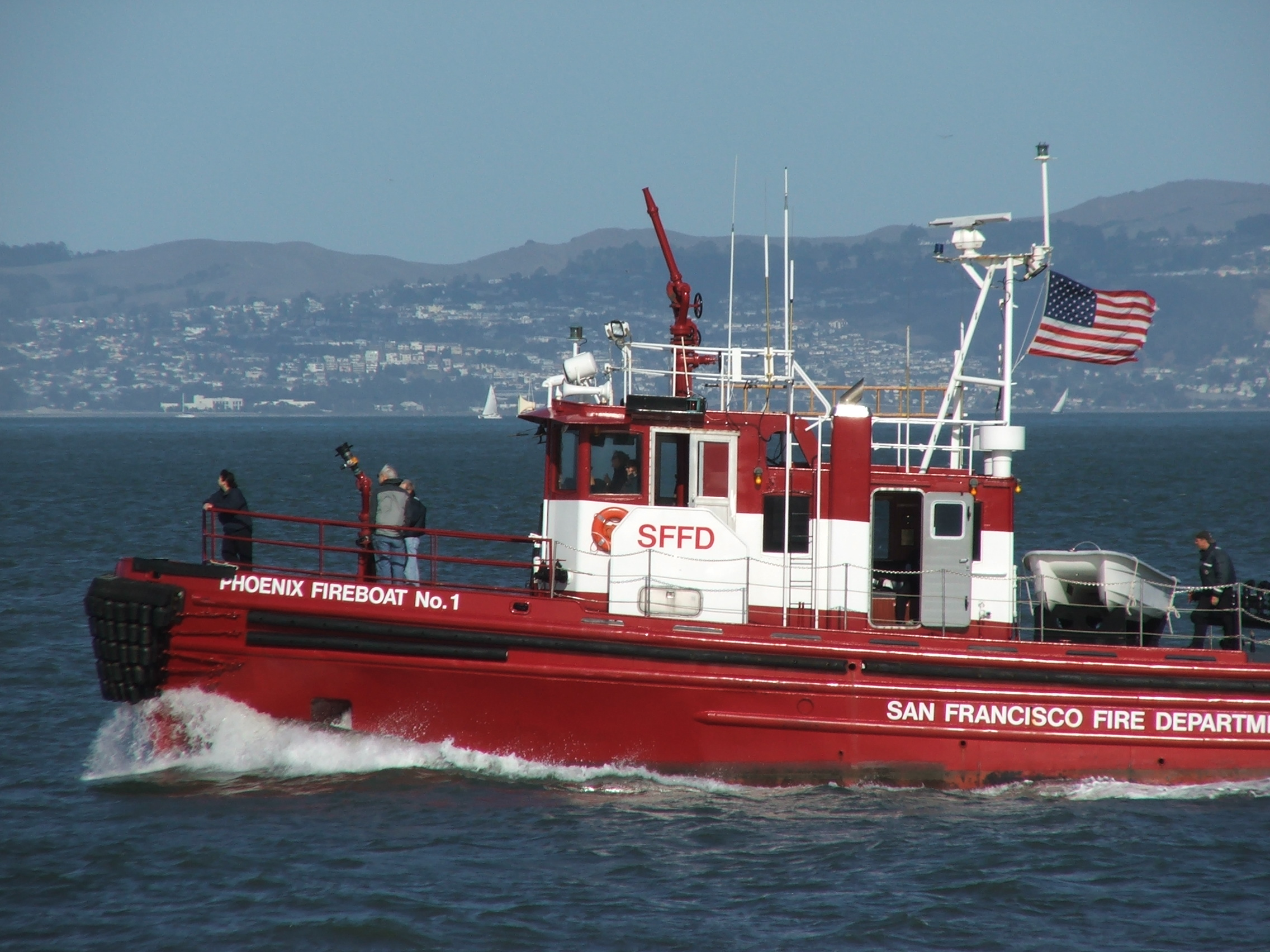
- Fireboat Phoenix

History

United States
- Name: Phoenix
- Owner: State of California
- Operator: San Francisco Fire Department
- Ordered: 1954
- In service: 1955
- Identification: MMSI number: 338127187; Callsign: WX5042

General characteristics
- Type: Fireboat
- Displacement: 146 tons
- Length: 89 ft (27 m)
- Beam: 19.5 ft (5.9 m)
- Draft: 7 ft (2.1 m)
- Propulsion: 2 × Cummins Model KTA-1150-M inline, 1 × Cummins Model NVHMS-1200
- Speed: 15 knots (28 km/h; 17 mph)
- Crew: 2 officers, 8 crew (maximum); 1 officer, 2 crew (minimum)

Phoenix is a fireboat owned by State of California and operated by the city of San Francisco in the San Francisco Bay since 1955. Phoenix is known for helping to save Marina District buildings from further destruction by fire following the 1989 Loma Prieta earthquake. Her worthy assistance resulted in a second vintage fireboat obtained for the city. Both Guardian and Phoenix are based at Firehouse No. 35 at Pier 22½ of the Port of San Francisco. Phoenix often leads parades of ships, and takes part in welcoming ceremonies.

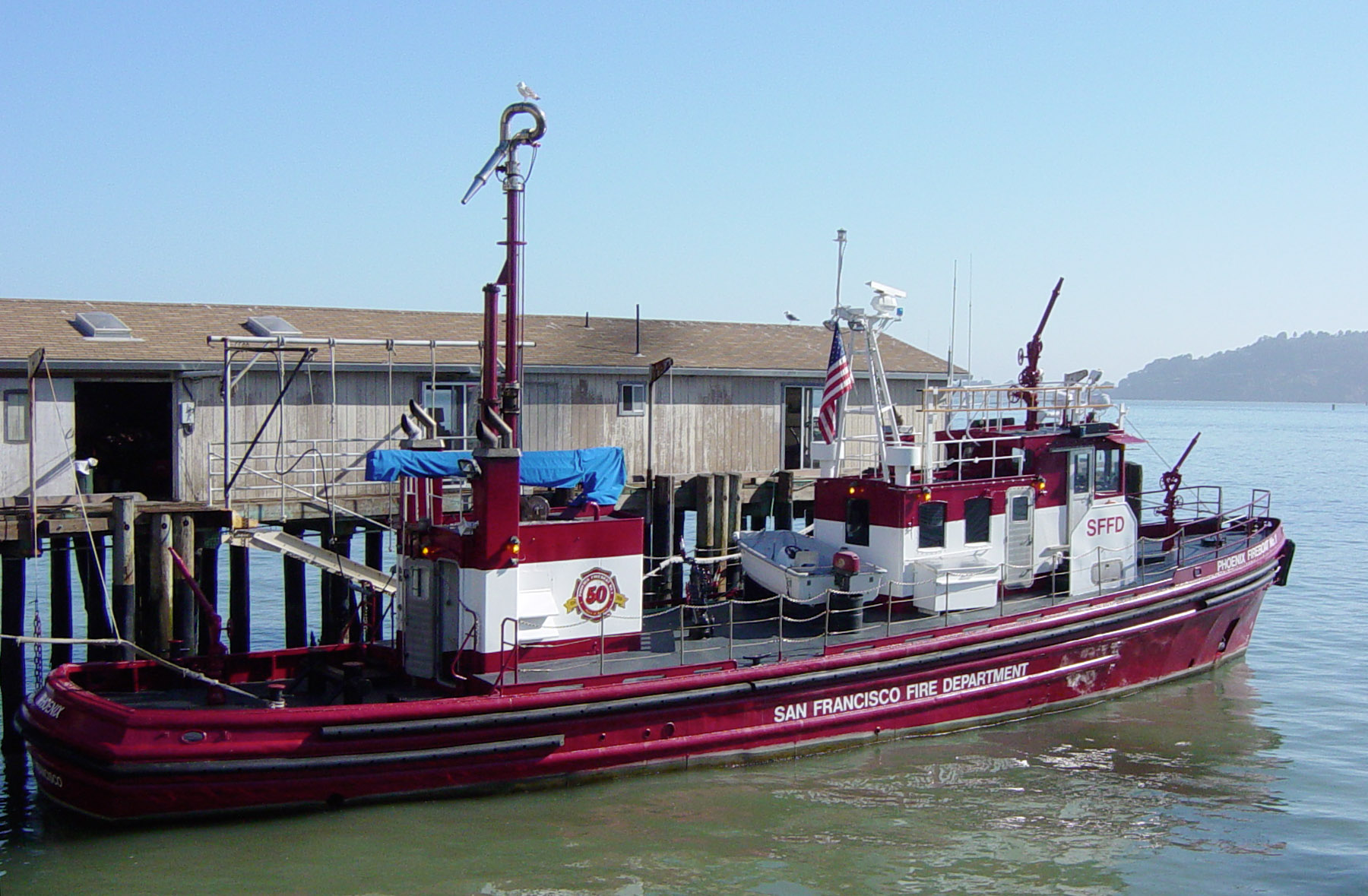
Phoenix at Pier 22½

== History ==
The city of San Francisco operated two fireboats in the 1900s: Governor Irwin and Governor Markham. Both were capable of pumping about 1,000 US gallons (3,800 L) per minute. These two, assisted by tugboats and military fireboats, tried but failed to stop the horrific fires which swept the city after the 1906 San Francisco earthquake. In 1909, two new fireboats were placed in service—David Scannell and Dennis T. Sullivan—steam-powered boats each rated for 9,000–10,000 US gallons (34,000–38,000 L) per minute. A firehouse was built for them at the edge of the Panama–Pacific International Exposition in 1915. This firehouse was moved by barge to Pier 22½ near the intersection of Harrison Street and Embarcadero following the Exposition, when the old fair buildings were being torn down and the Marina District was being built in its place. The two fireboats served the city for 45 years and were scrapped in 1954.

To fill the anticipated lack of a fireboat, Phoenix was built in 1954 in Alameda by Hugh F. Munroe of Plant Shipyard, paid for by the State of California. Her name came from a contest publicized by the Port Authority; the winning suggestion was submitted by a member of the Phoenix Society, a group of San Francisco citizens interested in civil fire protection. the Phoenix, the mythical firebird which rose anew from ashes, seemed appropriate because the city of San Francisco had risen seven times from great fires. The Phoenix bird is also a prominent feature of the Seal of San Francisco

Phoenix is 89 feet (27 m) long with a 19.5-foot (5.9 m) beam and a 7-foot (2.1 m) draft. Phoenix can pump up to 6,400 US gallons (24,000 L) at a pressure of 150 pounds per square inch (1,000 kPa), or at the rate of 3,200 US gallons (12,000 L) per minute at twice the pressure. She can make 15 knots (28 km/h; 17 mph). When put into service in 1955, Phoenix was the only fireboat based in San Francisco. Like her predecessors, she docked at Pier 22½; one of only two remaining 1915 Exposition buildings, the other being the Palace of Fine Arts.

Two decades later, Phoenix was the subject of discussions about the city budget. In the late 1970s, the fireboat's annual operating expenses were about $1.2 million. Mayor George Moscone met with the San Francisco Port Commission in 1977 to determine whether Phoenix would be refurbished, replaced, or scrapped with no replacement. An improvement bond was passed in November 1977 to build a new fireboat. Local naval architects Morris Guralnick Associates submitted a design in 1980 to replace Phoenix, but the estimated construction costs far exceeded the bond. Instead, Mayor Dianne Feinstein redirected the funds to refurbish Phoenix in 1981–1982.

== Firefighting ==
Phoenix's first call to action came on April 2, 1955. A four-alarm blaze at the Ferry Building greatly damaged the north end of the building; losses came to $750,000. Other notable fires that Phoenix fought include Pier 70 burning in 1980, and a lengthy battle at Piers 30–32 throughout the night of May 9–10, 1984—a five-alarm explosive conflagration which destroyed the piers and caused an estimated $2.5 million in damage.

Local shipping accidents are among the responsibilities of the Phoenix. In September 1965, the Norwegian freighter MS Berganger collided with the tanker Independent, resulting in fires aboard the ships. Phoenix responded along with U.S. Coast Guard fireboats to quickly put out the freighter's blaze, but the tanker took longer to extinguish. A year later, a gasoline barge collided with rocks near the shore. While Phoenix and the Coast Guard were investigating, the barge exploded killing two Coast Guardsmen and one nearby workman. Phoenix rescued a third Coast Guardsman with severe injuries, and fought to snuff the blaze. Flaming, floating gasoline proved difficult to subdue. In December 2011, a tourist DUKW boat suffered an engine fire while in McCovey Cove, and Phoenix doused the flames while the Coast Guard rescued the passengers and crew.

=== 1989 Marina District fires ===
Phoenix played a notable role in the response to the 1989 Loma Prieta earthquake. At 5:04 pm on October 17, 1989, a major earthquake rumbled through the San Francisco Bay Area. One of the hardest-hit locations was the Marina District of San Francisco; a densely populated neighborhood built up primarily in the 1920s on rubble, sand and debris dumped at the edge of the bay following the 1906 earthquake. A number of buildings collapsed, and firefighters were called to rescue trapped residents. Subsequent to a sharp aftershock, a fire broke out in a three-story building at Divisadero and Jefferson, threatening nearby buildings. Fire engines connected their hoses to the city's seawater-based Auxiliary Water Supply System (AWSS) and began to quench the fire, but an explosion caused the structure to collapse onto the fire hydrant. Fire crews were forced back, and with the assistance of off-duty police and civilian volunteers they ran hoses four blocks away to alternate sources. Further explosions caused other structures to collapse onto the newly laid hoses. At about the same time, other fire companies in the Marina were reporting water pressure problems with both the AWSS and the regular municipal water system. The AWSS was suffering from broken underground lines and from a 20% loss in stored water volume—both from earthquake damage—and from broken high pressure hydrants caused by building collapses. At 6:16 pm Phoenix was called to assist.

At 6:49 pm fire crews waiting to connect to Phoenix reported she was having difficulty getting close enough because of low tide conditions. Despite the problems requiring pilot and commander Arvid Havneras to perform an extraordinarily hazardous docking procedure, at 7:00 pm Phoenix was ready to pump at the Marina lagoon, two blocks away from the first fire. By this time the whole neighborhood was threatened with destruction by fire. Fire crews were manning hoses laid in anticipation; firefighters at the burning buildings were instructed to hold their ground, that they would soon have more water.

Phoenix connected hoses to an engine company and to two ladder trucks and commenced pumping seawater from the bay. Fire crews renewed their efforts, making a frontal attack on burning structures. Soon, one of the Fire Department's Hose Tenders arrived in the lagoon carrying 5,000 feet (1,500 m) of 5-inch (130 mm) hose, followed shortly by another hose tender—they connected to Phoenix to relay water to more distant engine companies. In a parallel effort, the AWSS lines were inspected by city workers, temporary repairs made, and two high-pressure pump stations were brought back into operation at about 8 pm, supplying 10,000 U.S. gallons per minute. Phoenix worked until all the Marina fires were under control, pumping seawater continuously for 15 hours at the rate of 6,400 gallons per minute, a total of 5.5 million gallons (20.8 ML).

Phoenix is credited with saving the area from further destruction. One of Feinstein's last mayoral acts was to save the city's only fireboat from suggested budget cuts. Some 21 months later the earthquake struck. Feinstein wrote that the boat "unquestionably saved the Marina from a greater catastrophe". The fireboat's role in the earthquake is the subject of a children's book, Frankie & The Phoenix. Senator Feinstein read the book to students at the opening of a new San Francisco elementary school dedicated in her name in August 2006.

Subsequent to the 1989 earthquake, $50,000 from grateful Marina property owners, and $300,000 from an anonymous donor were used to provide Phoenix with a colleague. Guardian, an older fireboat built in 1951, was purchased from the City of Vancouver, British Columbia, and refurbished. She was piloted down the Pacific Coast to dock alongside Phoenix at Pier 22½. In 1999, the shared fireboat house was declared San Francisco's 225th Historic Landmark.

A monument was planned to be sited in the Marina District commemorate the role of Phoenix in the Marina firefighting effort. Instead, a sculpture incorporating historic photos was installed near Firehouse 35 at Pier 22½ in the shape of the prow of a boat. The sculpture, titled "Bow" and created by Walter Hood, was unveiled on March 10, 2022.

== Ceremonial appearances ==
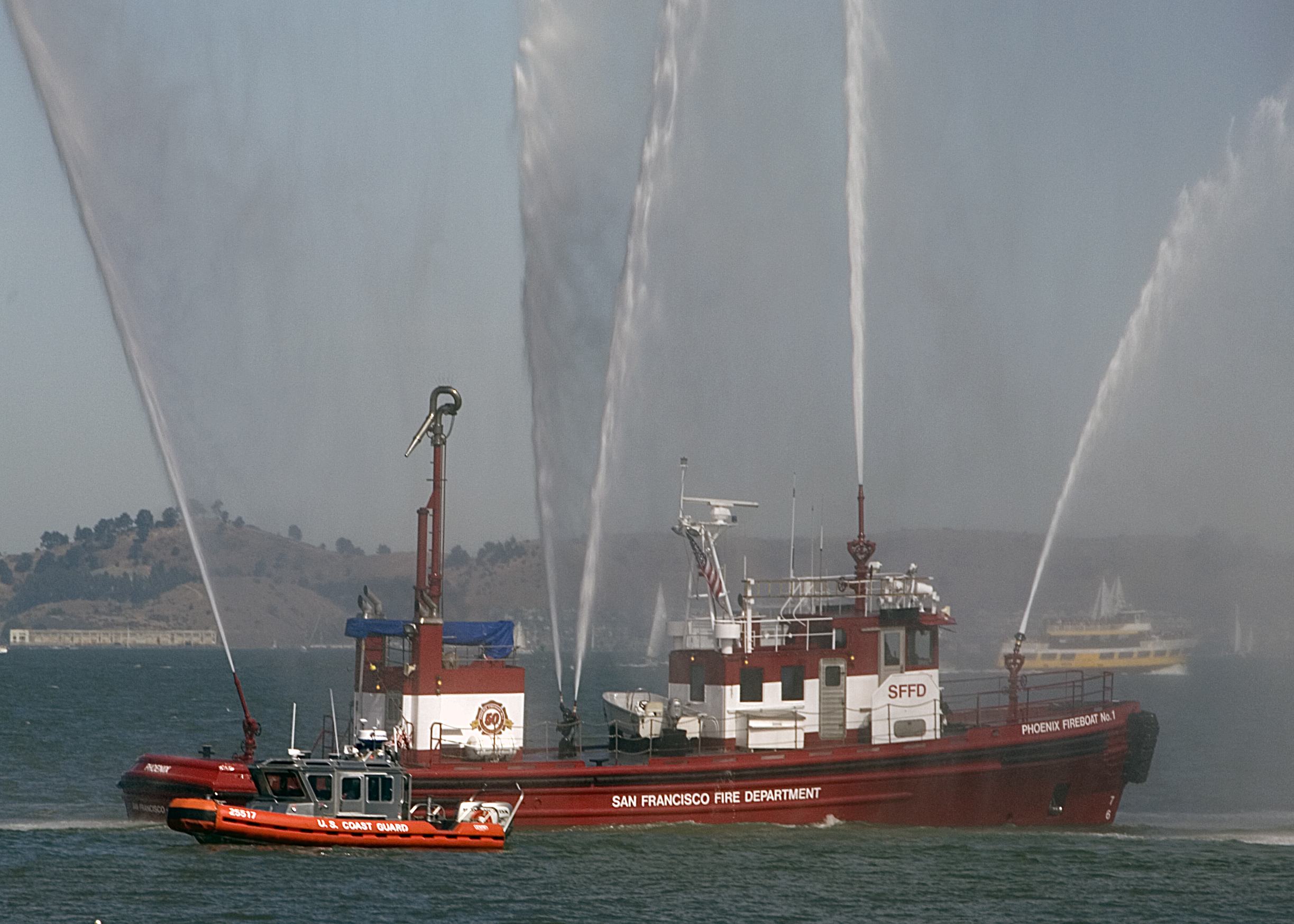
Phoenix leads a parade of ships during Fleet Week, October 2007

Phoenix has taken a lead role in many spectacles on the San Francisco Bay. The fireboat regularly leads parades on the bay, escorts famous ships entering the bay, and participates in tall ship events and Fleet Week in San Francisco. Phoenix threw out plumes of water to celebrate the reopening of the San Francisco–Oakland Bay Bridge on November 16, 1989 following its closure due to earthquake damage. Phoenix welcomed the historic cruise vessel SS Independence to San Francisco in November 2001. In July 2005, Phoenix led the "Parade of Sail" from the Golden Gate Bridge to the Bay Bridge. Famous tall ships in the parade included the 270-foot (82 m) barque ARM Cuauhtémoc from Mexico and the 356-foot (109 m) Pallada from Russia. Other ships included the Liberty ship SS Jeremiah O'Brien and the presidential yacht USS Potomac—both based in San Francisco Bay. In 2008, Phoenix led a similar parade including Californian (California's official tall ship, based in San Diego) and the Coast Guard barque the Eagle. The Jeremiah O'Brien took part as did the U.S. Navy submarine Pampanito.

== Crew and maintenance ==
Phoenix is normally operated with a crew of one vessel command Fireboat officer, one engineer who operates the pumps and engines, one pilot who steers/navigates the boat, one fire Engine company officer, and three to five firefighters to handle hoses and nozzles. Firehouse 35 on Pier 22½ has seven men on duty at all times: four to serve Engine #35, and three dedicated to the two fireboats. All seven are able to man the fireboats in an emergency. As many as ten men can work Phoenix, but in October 1989 after Engine #35 was called to duty, only three were available: Pilot Arvid Havneras, Engineer Nate Hardy, and Lieutenant Bob Banchero. Both fireboat pilot and engineer are licensed by the US Coast Guard.

In the early 2000s, San Francisco spent $1.7 million each year to operate its two fireboats. Maintenance problems on the historic vessels increased to the point that Phoenix needed to be lifted into dry dock for extensive repairs to the hull. The fireboat was thoroughly renovated in 2004 at Bayside Boatworks in Sausalito, California.
