= Earl Gage Jr. =

American firefighter

- Born: November 19, 1926; Beaumont, Texas, U.S.
- Died: July 30, 2017 (aged 90); Elk Grove, California, U.S.
- Education: San Francisco City College; University of California, Berkeley
- Occupation: Firefighter
- Known for: First Black firefighter in San Francisco, California
- Spouse: Blondell Wright
- Children: 1

Earl Gage Jr. (c. 1927 – July 30, 2017) was an American firefighter. He was the first Black firefighter in San Francisco, California. He served as the only Black firefighter for 12 years. During his 28-year career, Gage promoted efforts to increase racial diversity.

== Biography ==
=== Early life ===
Gage was born in 1926 in Beaumont, Texas. In 1945, Gage's family moved from Texas to San Francisco. He had 2 sisters and 4 brothers. Gage graduated from San Francisco City College and the University of California, Berkeley, with a pre-med focus. He was drafted into the United States Army.

=== Career ===
"He was a trailblazer, and paved the way for the SFFD to become one of the most diverse departments in the world, truly representing the city we serve," – Joanne Hayes-White, San Francisco Fire Chief

The San Francisco Fire Department hired Gage in 1955.

Gage experienced racism in his career, especially during the twelve years in which he was the only Black firefighter. In the fire station bunks, firefighters soiled his mattress and threw it away. Crews were assigned rotating beds regularly, and some would refuse to sleep on a mattress used prior by Gage. As a result, Gage had his own mattress that he transported himself to the different stations. As early as 1969, Gage began calling for increased diversity in the department.

As a result of the ongoing racism and threats to his safety, Gage moved from fighting fires to serving as director of community services. He was the first Black man to hold a departmental command position. During his work a director, which was supported by San Francisco Mayor Joseph Alioto, he recruited firefighters and improved the diversity among staff. He hired Robert Demmons, who would become the city's first Black fire chief. He also developed training for entrance exams, loosening requirements to make it easier for recruits to pass the exams after feedback of the tests being too hard. Gage also re-launched two programs: field trips for children to visit fire departments and seasonal holiday decorations at firehouses. Gage also advocated for women to be let into the squad, but his requests were not met until after he retired.

Gage retired, after 28 years, in 1983. Despite his retirement, in 1987 he was named in a consent decree to increase diversity, including both racially and by gender, in the fire department. After retirement, Gage became a real estate broker.

=== Death and legacy ===
Gage died on July 30, 2017, in Elk Grove, California. The service was held at the Third Baptist Church in San Francisco.

At Gage's funeral, Sherman Tillman, president of the San Francisco Black Firefighters Association, first proposed the idea of naming a street after Gage. In 2020, the San Francisco Board of Supervisors voted unanimously to rename part of Willow Street after Gage.

In 2022, the city honored Gage with a 15-foot full-color mural at Rosa Parks Elementary School. At the unveiling, Mayor London Breed stated that Gage "paved the way" for Black leaders in San Francisco, such as the first Black fire chief, Robert Demmons, the first Black mayor, Willie Brown Jr., and London Breed herself, the first Black woman mayor.

== Personal life ==
In 1952, he married Blondell Wright, whom he converted to Catholicism to wed.
