= St. Francis (fireboat) =

Fireboat operated by the San Francisco Fire Department

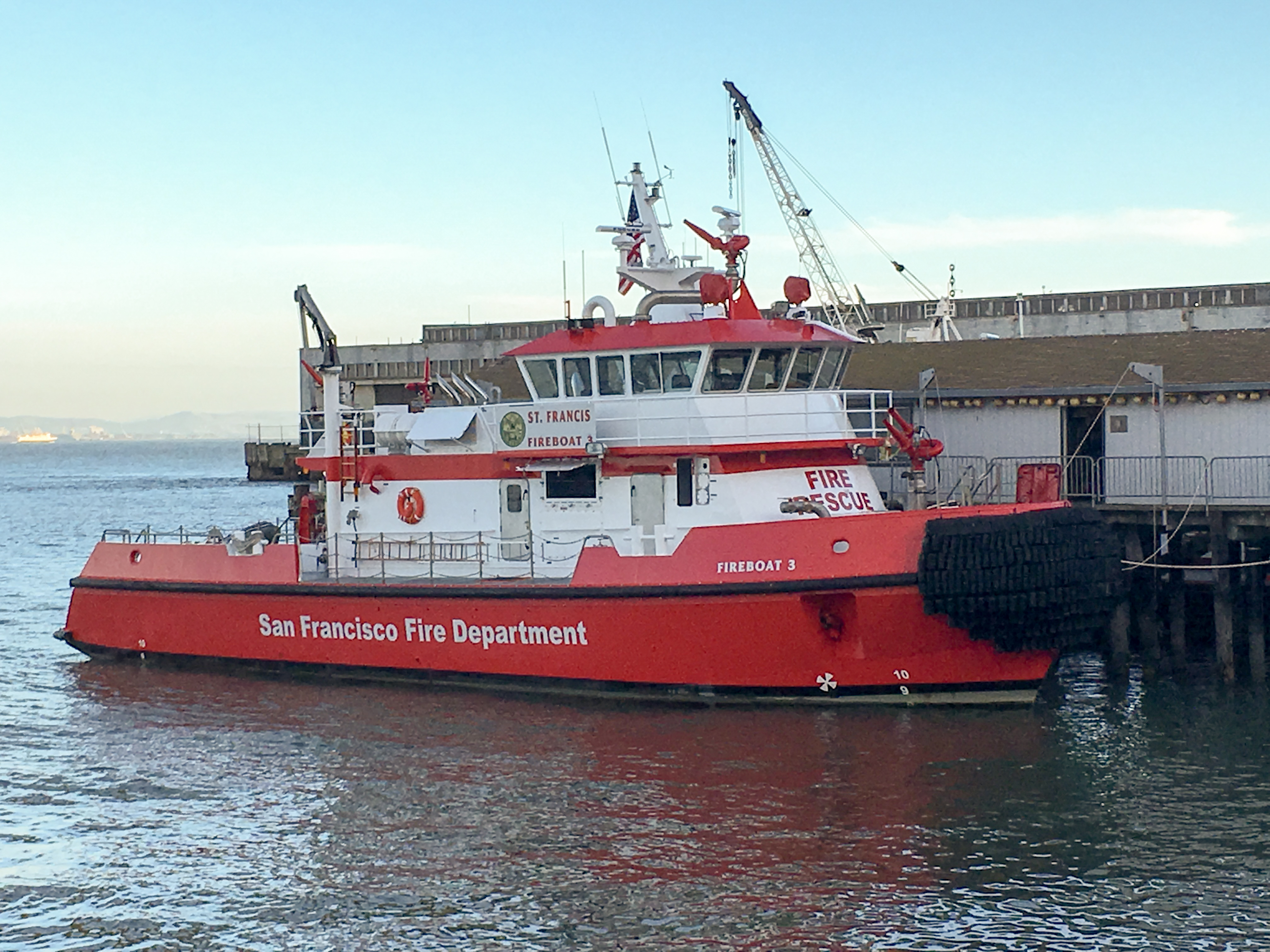
- SF Fireboat 3

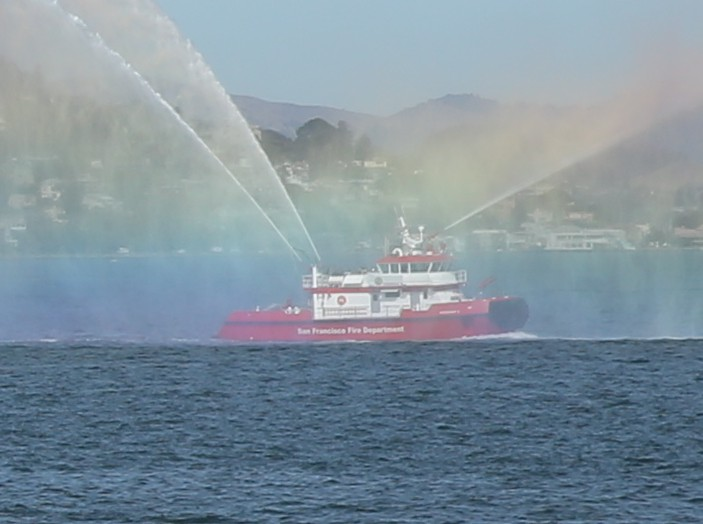
In October, 2016, San Francisco's new fireboat, helped the US Navy celebrate Fleet Week.

St. Francis is a fireboat operated by the San Francisco Fire Department on San Francisco Bay since 2016. Also known as Fireboat 3, she was given the official name on October 17, 2016, the anniversary of the 1989 Loma Prieta earthquake. Local schoolchildren helped pick the vessel's name.

San Francisco had been about to retire the Phoenix, its last fireboat, when the earthquake proved its worth. The earthquake broke water mains. The Phoenix was equipped with extra fire-hose couplings, so her pumps were able to provide water pressure to a temporary network of fire-hoses, so local fire engines could fight fires in neighborhoods where the earthquake broke underground pipes.

Most of the vessel's $11.8 million construction cost was paid for from a port security grant from the U.S. Department of Homeland Security. Senator Dianne Feinstein attended the vessel's christening. According to the San Francisco Chronicle, Feinstein was largely responsible for securing $8 million in federal funds to pay for the vessel. Feinstein reflected on how, during her time as San Francisco's mayor, some fiscal conservatives wanted to retire the city's last fireboat, Phoenix and how that vessel proved its worth during the Loma Prieta earthquake, when she was able to pump water to substitute for fire mains broken during the quake.

On May 23, 2020, the St. Francis and her crew saved the SS Jeremiah O'Brien, a World War II museum ship, when a major fire broke out on Pier 45, where she was moored.

Specifications
feature	value
length	88 feet (27 m)
breadth	25 feet (7.6 m)
draft	14 feet (4.3 m)
power	750 horsepower (560 kW)
pumping capacity	18,000 gpm
