= Guardian (fireboat) =

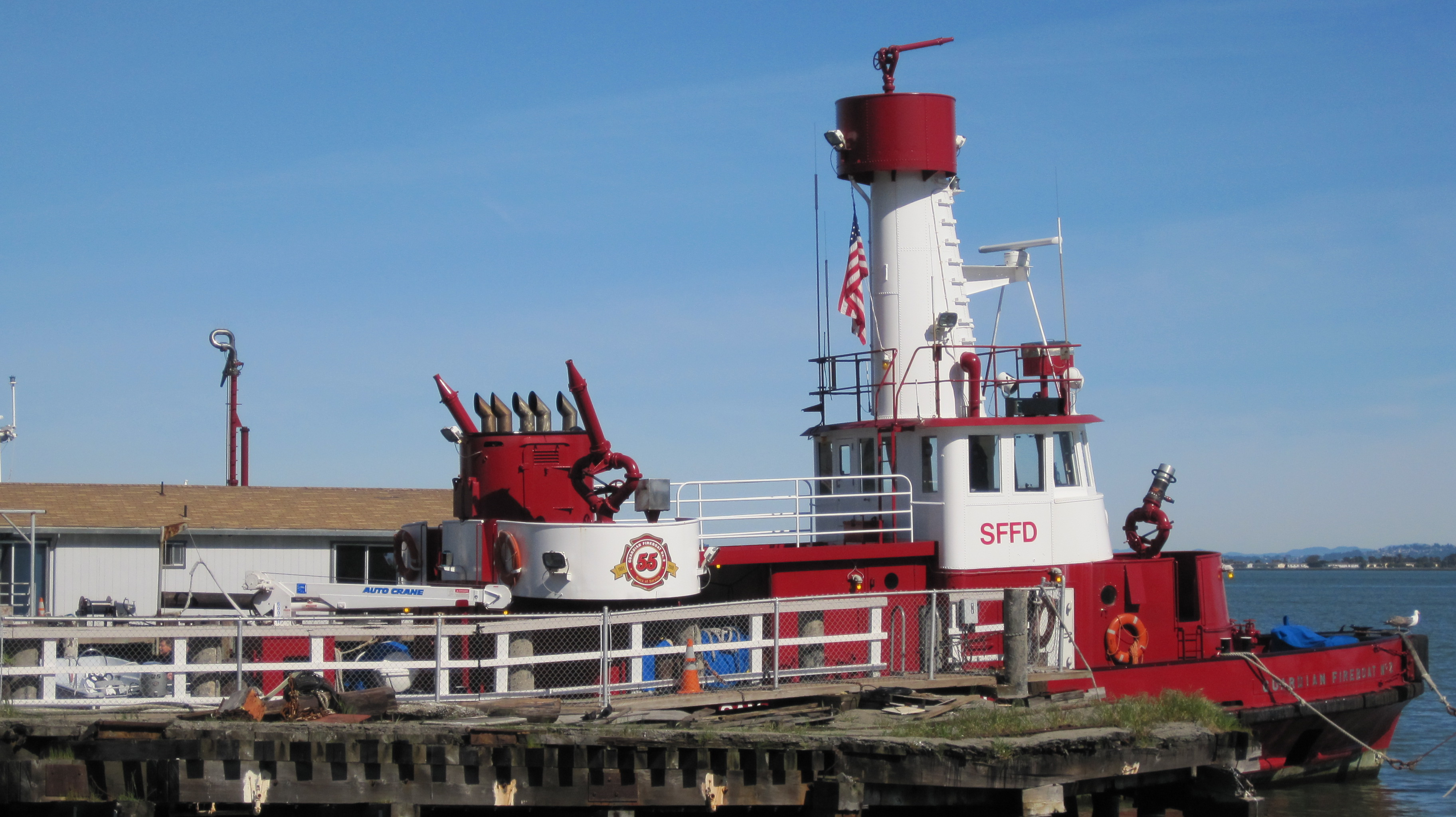

History

United States
- Name: Guardian
- Owner: San Francisco Fire Department 1990-2022 Guardian Fireboat SF, LLC 2022-Present
- Operator: San Francisco Fire Department 1990-2022 Guardian Fireboat SF, LLC 2022-Present
- Builder: Yarrows, Ltd., Esquimalt, British Columbia, Canada

General characteristics
- Type: Fireboat
- Tonnage: 80 tons
- Displacement: 188 tons
- Length: 88 ft (27 m)
- Beam: 21.6 ft (6.6 m)
- Draft: 7 ft (2.1 m)
- Installed power: 2 x GM Detroit Diesel 3 cylinder engines - generators
- Propulsion: 2 × GM Detroit Diesel 12 cylinder engines, 456 BHP each
- Speed: 15 knots (28 km/h; 17 mph)

Guardian is a fireboat that was owned by San Francisco Fire Department from 1990 until December, 2022. She operated in the San Francisco Bay since 1990 in reserve status. Guardian was a gift to the people of San Francisco by anonymous donors following the notable role of the fireboat Phoenix in helping to save the Marina District buildings from further destruction by fire following the 1989 Loma Prieta earthquake. Both Guardian Fireboat No. 2 and Phoenix Fireboat No. 1 have been based at Firehouse No. 35 at Pier 22½ of the Port of San Francisco. Guardian was officially retired by the City of San Francisco in 2022 and was purchased at auction by a small group of individuals intending to keep this vessel in San Francisco Bay. She is anticipated to be ready for charters and events once proper restoration and refitting to safely transport passengers is complete. Guardian is also being prepared for use as an on-water fireboat training facility for the West Coast.

Guardian has 5 pumps which can deliver up to 28,000 gallons of water per minute, significantly more than Phoenix making it one of the most powerful water pumping fireboats in the world.

== History ==
Guardian was built by Yarrows, LTD of British Columbia in 1951 and was hull number 115.

Guardian served the city of Vancouver, British Columbia, Canada from 1951 until the time it was retired in 1987 by Vancouver Fire and Rescue Services under the name Fireboat #2.

Though the city of San Francisco had operated two fireboats from the early 1900 until 1954, the Phoenix was the only fireboat in the city from 1955 until the 1989 Loma Prieta earthquake. Because of the role of Phoenix in the protection of the Marina District after the 1989 earthquake, $50,000 from grateful Marina property owners and $300,000 from anonymous donors were used purchase and refurbish Guardian. Upon arrival in San Francisco, the ship was rechristened Guardian, a name chosen by the school children of San Francisco at the request of the anonymous donors.

Both Guardian and Phoenix have been based at Pier 22 1/2. Guardian was officially retired in 2022 and sold at auction in December. In 1999, Firehouse 35 at Pier 22 1/2 was declared San Francisco's 225th Historic Landmark.

== Crew and maintenance ==
Guardian has operated in San Francisco since 1990 in an uncrewed reserve status. Firehouse 35 on Pier 22½ has seven crew on duty at all times: four to serve Engine #35, and three dedicated to the two fireboats. All seven are able to crew the fireboats in an emergency.
