= David Scannell (fireboat) =

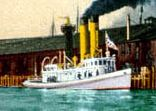
The David Scannel in 1912

The David Scannell was a steam-powered fireboat built for and operated by the San Francisco Fire Department. The city had no fireboats at the time of the disastrous 1906 San Francisco earthquake, so United States Navy fireboats had to travel there to help fight the extensive fires in the aftermath of the earthquake.

San Francisco built a second ship to the same design, the Dennis T. Sullivan, which was launched later in 1909. Both vessels were retired in 1954.

The vessel is named after David S. Scannell, San Francisco's first Fire Chief when, in 1871, it transitioned from volunteers to paid staff.

specifications
Cost	$139,809
Length	120 feet (37 m)
Beam	26 feet (7.9 m)
Draft	12 feet (3.7 m)
Displacement	272 tons
