= Pier 35 (Port Melbourne) =

Pier in Australia

Coordinates: 37.8237°S 144.9073°E

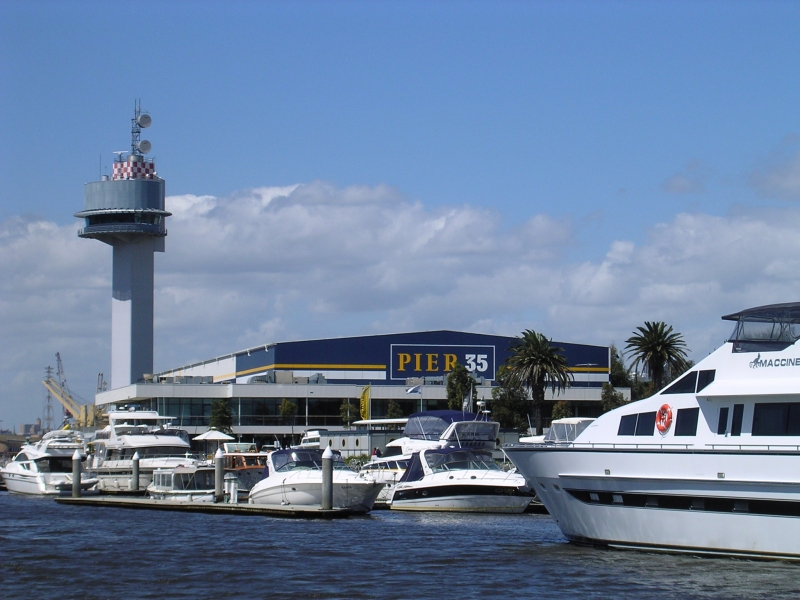
Pier 35

Pier 35 is a pier along Lorimer Street on the Yarra River in Port Melbourne, Victoria, Australia. It contains the Pier 35 Bar and Grill restaurant, formerly the Steakhouse, and d'Albora Marinas, a major supplier of marina berths. In 2004, Australia's leading marina owner, Macquarie Leisure, purchased Pier 35 for almost $A15 million.
