= David S. Scannell =

- Scannell c. 1881
- Born: c. 1820; New York City, New York, U.S.
- Died: March 30, 1893 (aged 73); San Francisco, California, U.S.
- Occupations: Firefighter, sheriff
- Known for: First Fire Chief of the San Francisco Fire Department

David S. Scannell (c. 1820 – March 30, 1893) was an American firefighter, law enforcement official, and veteran of the Mexican–American War.

== Biography ==
"Baseball Mania in San Francisco," a cartoon by George Frederick Keller published in The Wasp depicting San Francisco firefighters, national guardsmen, policemen and youths playing baseball, December 14, 1878

Scannell was born in New York City in about 1820, and began working as a volunteer firefighter when he was just twelve years old.

In 1846 he volunteered to fight during the Mexican–American War, and was commissioned as a Lieutenant in the 2nd Regiment of Foot of New York. His unit fought at the battles of Veracruz, Cerro Gordo, Contreras, Churubusco, Chapultepec and Garita de Belen. His unit experienced extremely heavy casualties, but Scannell returned to New York uninjured.

In 1851 he moved from New York to California during the California Gold Rush. He joined San Francisco's volunteer fire department, and enrolled in a local militia.

Scannell was San Francisco's third elected Sheriff, serving from 1855 to 1856. When the San Francisco Fire Department transitioned from an organization staffed by volunteers to one staffed by full-time paid staff Scannell served as its first fire chief.

== Death and legacy ==
Scannell died on March 30, 1893, in San Francisco. He was buried in Lone Mountain Cemetery. His remains were moved to Cypress Lawn Memorial Park in Colma, California before 1941.

Scannell's will and testament established an award, the David S. Scannell Medal, to be given annually to an outstanding San Francisco firefighter. In 1909, the city named a fireboat after him, the David Scanell.
