= Pier 35 (San Francisco) =

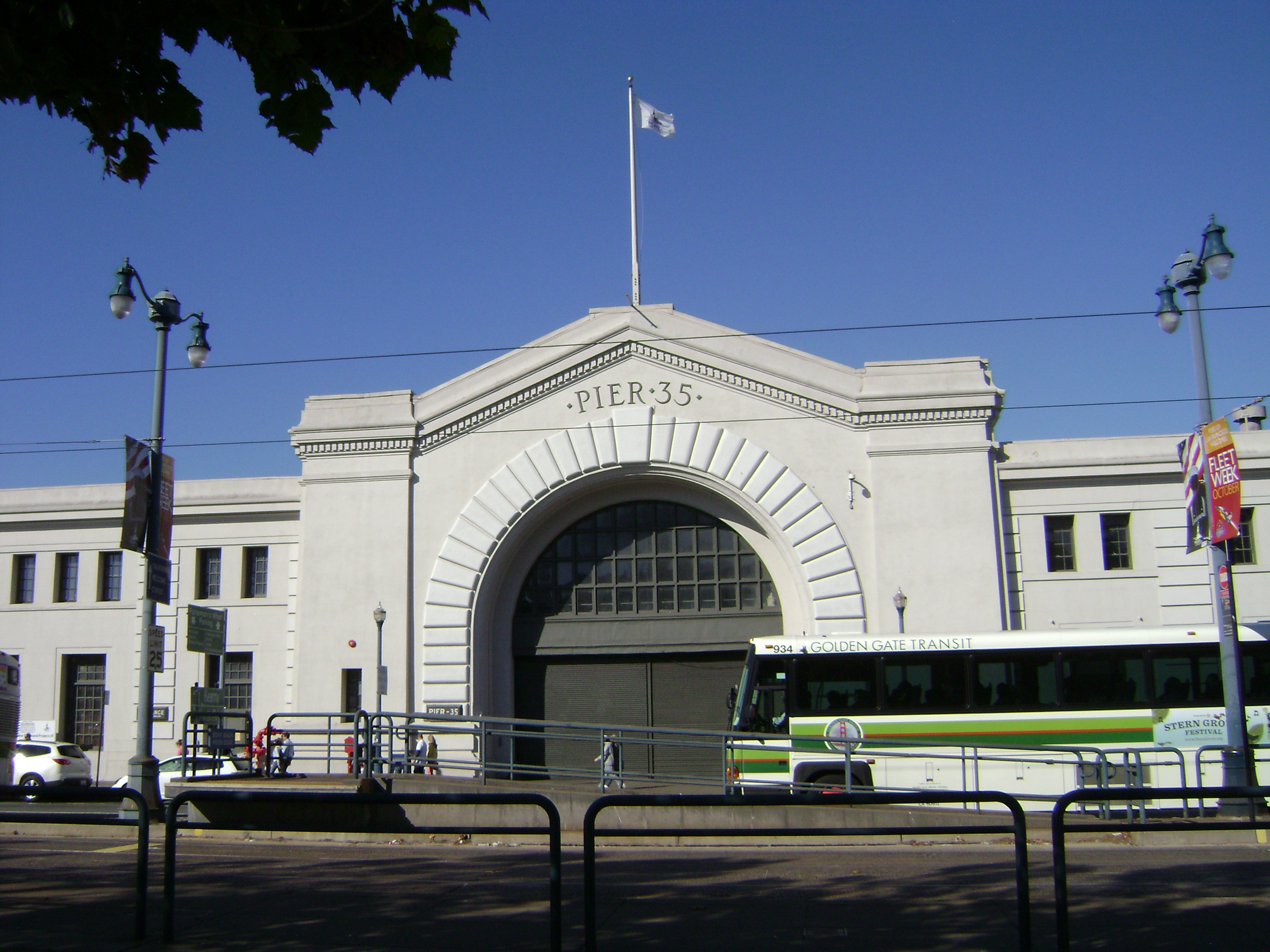
- Pier 35

- Location within San Francisco

General information
- Type: Pier
- Location: San Francisco, 1454 The Embarcadero, San Francisco, CA 94133
- Coordinates: 37.807313°N 122.406249°W
- Construction started: 1914
- Completed: 1916
- Renovated: 1933, 1981
- Owner: Port of San Francisco

Pier 35 is a pier in The Embarcadero, San Francisco, US, just to the east of Pier 39.

== Background ==
Pier 35 served as San Francisco's primary major cruise ship terminal for eight decades, servicing several cruise operators including the Grace Line, Matson Line, Pacific Far East Line, and Princess Cruises, whose ships Star Princess, Sapphire Princess, and Sea Princess made regular stops at the pier throughout the year.

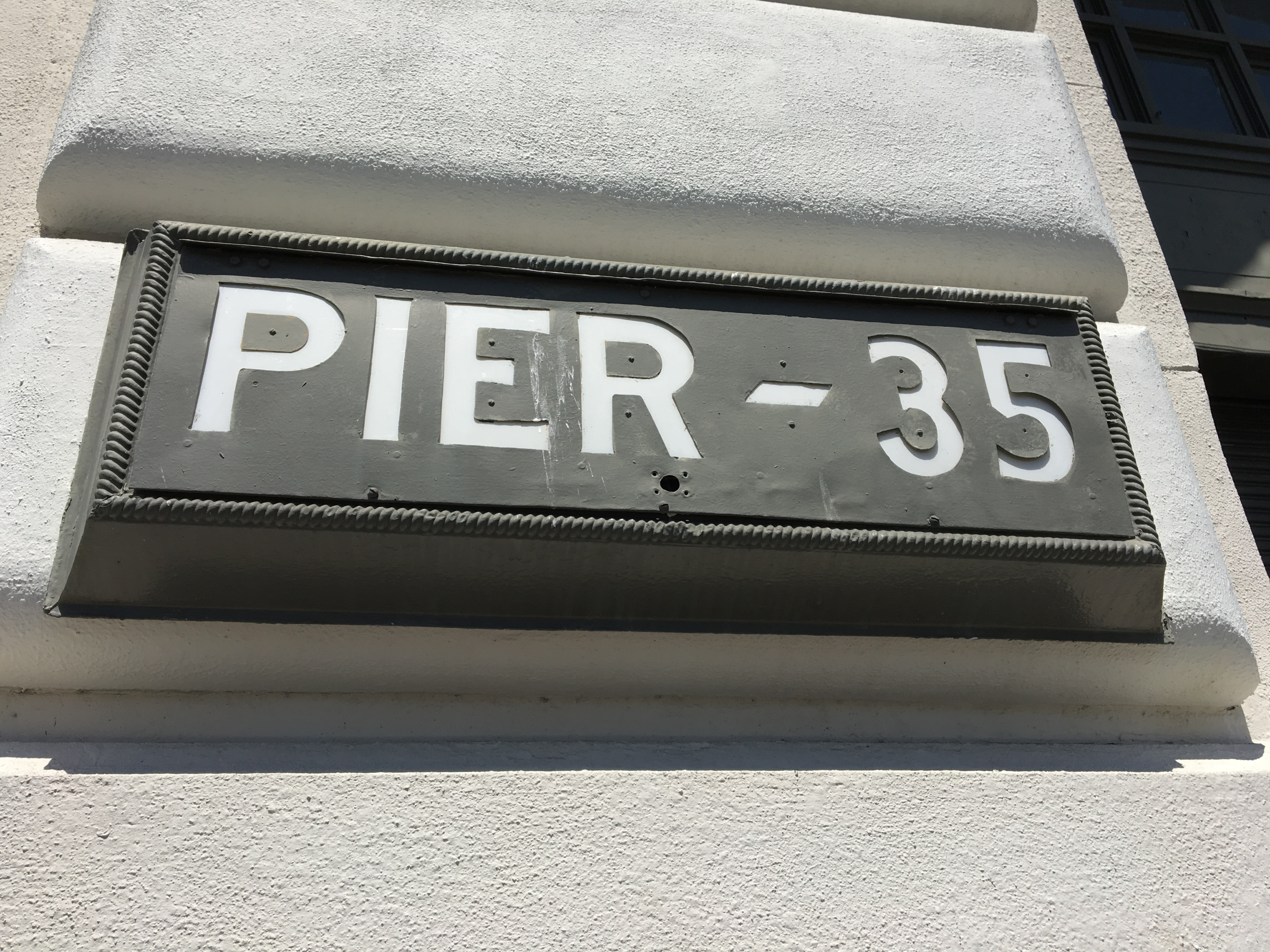
Sign for Pier 35

The bulkhead wharf and pier substructure were built in 1914, and the bulkhead building and transit shed were built in 1915–1916. It was rebuilt by the State Board of Harbor Commissioners and dedicated as the new San Francisco terminal for the Grace Line on October 19, 1933. Santa Lucia, one of the line's large new liners, was present and the first of the big new intercoastal liners to use the pier. The rebuilt pier was designed to expedite cargo and passenger passage from ship to destination. Large, comfortable rooms were located on the elevated gallery for passengers and friends for boarding and debarking. The manager for Grace in San Francisco estimated the new facility would handle 12,000 passengers, 60,000 visitors and 300,000 tons of cargo during the next year.

In 1981, major changes were made to the east aisle of the interior of the transit shed, including the addition of new offices, waiting rooms, an escalator, and a staircase, and alterations to the mezzanine gallery.

On New Year's Eve 2009, a stabbing incident took place on the pier.

== Current usage ==
Since the opening of the James R. Herman Cruise Terminal at Pier 27 in 2014, Pier 35 has been used as a backup facility for cruise ship operations. The pier's transit shed has been converted for use as a rentable event space.

In 2020, the historic Liberty ship SS Jeremiah O'Brien was temporarily moved to Pier 35 following a fire which damaged its previous home at Pier 45. The Jeremiah O'Brien's relocation was made permanent in 2023 when the nonprofit organization responsible for the ship signed a long-term lease with the Port of San Francisco.
