= SS Jeremiah O'Brien =

US cargo ship from World War II, now a museum ship

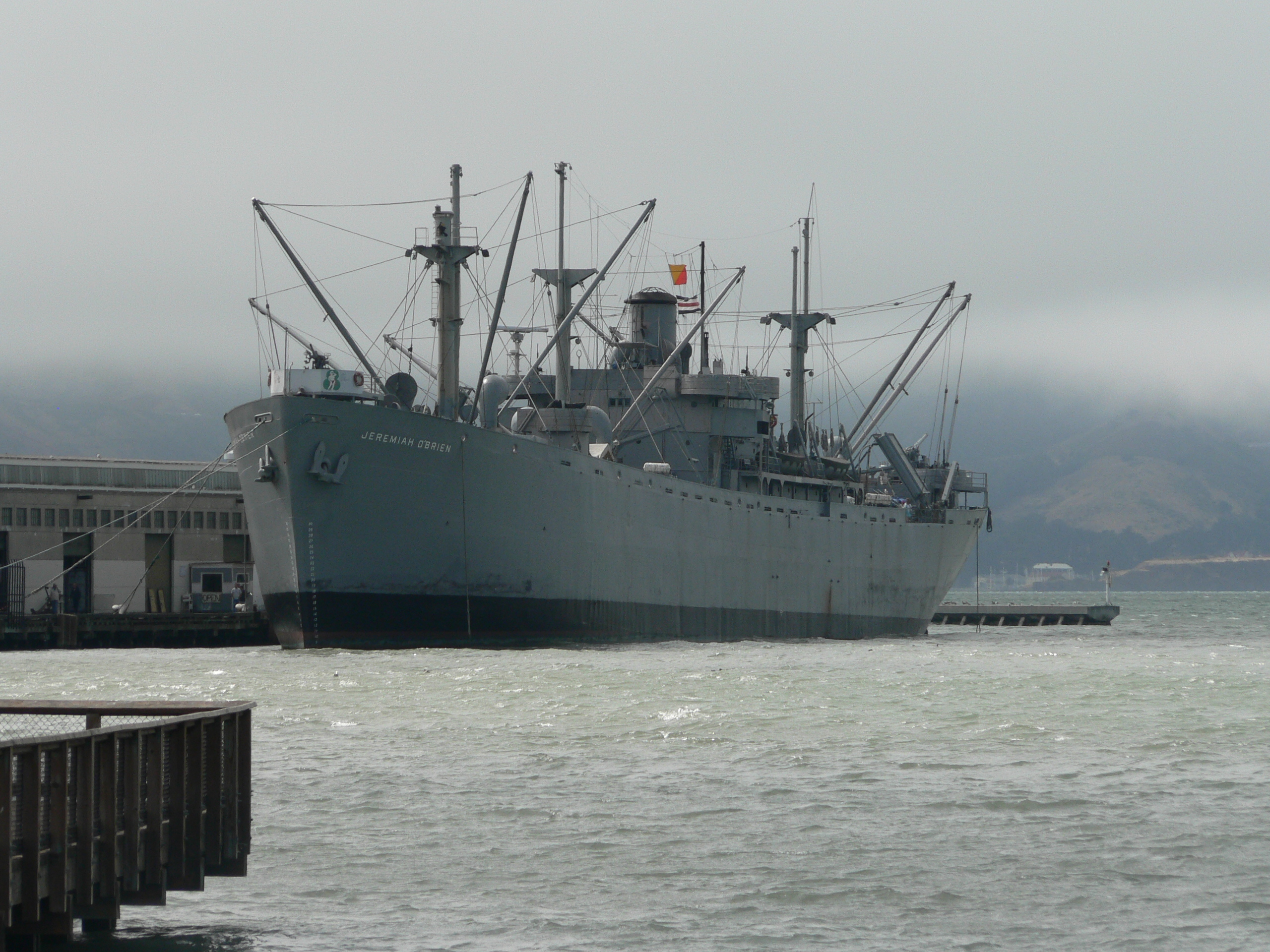
- SS Jeremiah O'Brien at her former berth at Pier 45 in San Francisco

History

United States
- Name: Jeremiah O'Brien
- Namesake: Jeremiah O'Brien
- Owner: War Shipping Administration
- Operator: Grace Line, Inc.
- Port of registry: Portland, Maine; San Francisco
- Builder: New England Shipbuilding Corporation
- Yard number: 230
- Laid down: 6 May 1943
- Launched: 19 June 1943
- In service: 3 July 1943
- Out of service: 7 February 1946
- Identification: Call sign: KXCH; IMO number: 5171749; MMSI number: 366879000; ABS class no: 4304713
- Status: Seagoing museum ship since 1979

General characteristics
- Class & type: EC2-S-C1 (Liberty ship)
- Displacement: 15,928 long tons (16,184 t)
- Length: 441 ft 6 in (134.57 m)
- Beam: 57 ft (17 m)
- Draft: 27 ft 9 in (8.46 m)
- Propulsion: Two Foster Wheeler (Babcock & Wilcox-design) boilers, 235 psi (1,600 kPa); 3-cylinder reciprocating triple expansion steam engine, 2,500 horsepower (~1.9 MW) at 76 rpm; 1 shaft, 18-foot (5.5-meter) screw
- Speed: 11 knots (20 km/h; 13 mph)
- Armament: 1 × 5-inch (127 mm)/38-caliber gun (stern); 1 × 3-inch (76 mm)/50-caliber gun (bow); 8 × 20 mm Oerlikon anti-aircraft guns
- SS Jeremiah O'Brien
- U.S. National Register of Historic Places
- U.S. National Historic Landmark
- Location within California
- Location: Pier 35, San Francisco, California
- Coordinates: 37°48′31″N 122°24′25″W
- Built: 1943
- Architect: New York Shipbuilding Corp.
- Website: ssjeremiahobrien.org
- NRHP reference No.: 78003405

Significant dates
- Added to NRHP: 7 June 1978
- Designated NHL: 14 January 1986

SS Jeremiah O'Brien is a Liberty ship built during World War II and named after the American Revolutionary War ship captain Jeremiah O'Brien (1744–1818).

Now based in San Francisco, she is a survivor (Note: The tugboat Nash, another National Historic Landmark ship located in Oswego, New York, is another survivor of the D-Day fleet, as is the battleship USS Texas (BB-35) near Houston, Texas.) of the 6,939-ship 6 June 1944 D-Day armada off the coast of Normandy, France.

Of the 2,710 Liberty ships that were built, only the Jeremiah O'Brien and the SS John W. Brown (both operational as of 2024) and the SS Hellas Liberty (a static museum ship) are still afloat.

== History ==
=== World War II ===
Jeremiah O'Brien is a class EC2-S-CI ship, built in just 56 days at the New England Shipbuilding Corporation in South Portland, Maine and launched on 19 June 1943. Deployed in the European Theater of Operations, she made four round-trip convoy crossings of the Atlantic and was part of the Operation Neptune invasion fleet armada on D-Day. She made 11 cross-channel round-trips to support the invasion. Following this she was sent to the Pacific Theater of Operations and saw 16 months of service in both the South Pacific and Indian Ocean calling at ports in Chile, Peru, New Guinea, the Philippines, India, China, and Australia.

=== Postwar ===
The end of the war caused most of the Liberty ships to be removed from service in 1946 and many were subsequently sold to foreign and domestic buyers. Others were retained by the U.S. Maritime Commission for potential reactivation in the event of future military conflicts. Jeremiah O'Brien was mothballed and remained in the National Defense Reserve Fleet in Suisun Bay for 33 years.

=== Restoration ===
In the 1970s, however, the idea of preserving an unaltered Liberty Ship began to be developed and, under the sponsorship of Rear Admiral Thomas J. Patterson, USMS (then the Western Regional Director of the U.S. Maritime Administration), the ship was put aside for preservation instead of being sold for scrap. In a 1994 interview printed by the Vintage Preservation magazine Old Glory, Patterson claimed the ship was steamed to her anchorage in the mothball fleet (unlike the many that were secured as unserviceable and towed into storage), and frequently placed at the back of the list for disposal which undoubtedly contributed to her survival.

An all-volunteer group, the National Liberty Ship Memorial (NLSM), acquired Jeremiah O'Brien in 1979 for restoration. At that time, she was virtually the last Liberty at the anchorage. The volunteers who campaigned to resurrect the mothballed ship (led by Captain Edward MacMichael, NLSM Executive Director, and Master) were able to get the steam plant operating while she remained in Suisun Bay. After more than three decades in mothballs, Jeremiah O'Brien's boilers were lit. The ship left the mothball fleet on 6 October 1979 bound for San Francisco Bay, drydocking, and thousands of hours of restoration work. She was the only Liberty Ship to leave the mothball fleet under her own power.

Jeremiah O'Brien then moved to Fort Mason on the San Francisco waterfront just to the west of Fisherman's Wharf to become a museum ship dedicated to the men and women who built and sailed with the United States Merchant Marine in World War II. She was named a National Historic Mechanical Engineering Landmark by the American Society of Mechanical Engineers in 1984 and designated a National Historic Landmark in 1986. Licensed to carry tours around San Francisco Bay, it was suggested that the ship be restored to oceangoing specification. After efforts in securing sponsorship, this was accomplished in time for the 50th "D-Day" Anniversary Celebrations in 1994.

=== 50th Anniversary of D-Day ===
In 1994, Jeremiah O'Brien steamed through the Golden Gate bound for France. She went down the West Coast, through the Panama Canal, and crossed the Atlantic for the first time since World War II. She stopped first in London, England, where she was berthed adjacent to HMS Belfast, then went on to Portsmouth for the D-Day +50 celebrations before she continued on to Normandy, where Jeremiah O'Brien and her crew (a volunteer crew of veteran World War II-era sailors and a few cadets from the California Maritime Academy) participated in the 50th Anniversary of Operation Overlord, the Allied invasion of Western Europe. She was the only large ship from the original Normandy flotilla to return for the event.

=== Today ===
Docked at Pier 35, she makes several passenger-carrying daylight cruises each year in the San Francisco Bay, and occasional voyages to more distant ports such as Seattle and San Diego.

Footage of the ship's engine was used in the 1997 film Titanic to depict the ill-fated ship's own triple-expansion engines. The engine is very similar to the engines on board the RMS Titanic; two of her engines were triple expansion marine steam engines, albeit Titanic's engines were four cylinders as opposed to three.

The ship is completely restored to its original World War II configuration. Most areas are open to the public, including the engine room, bridge, and cargo holds. Modernization has been kept to a minimum and mostly involves systems related to safety, communications, and navigation.

In 2009, Jeremiah O'Brien was dry docked inside Eureka at Pier 70. During that same year, Tim Ferriss hosted a party aboard the ship to celebrate the success of his LitLiberation project.

On 23 May 2020, Jeremiah O'Brien and USS Pampanito were threatened by a 4-alarm fire at a warehouse structure next to where Jeremiah O'Brien was berthed at San Francisco's Pier 45, but both vessels were undamaged due to the actions of the local firefighters. The fireboat St. Francis is credited with saving the ship. Following the fire, the ship was moved on a temporary basis to Pier 35 until repairs to Pier 45 could be made. This relocation was made permanent in 2023 when the nonprofit organization responsible for the ship signed a long-term lease at Pier 35 with the Port of San Francisco.

== Gallery ==
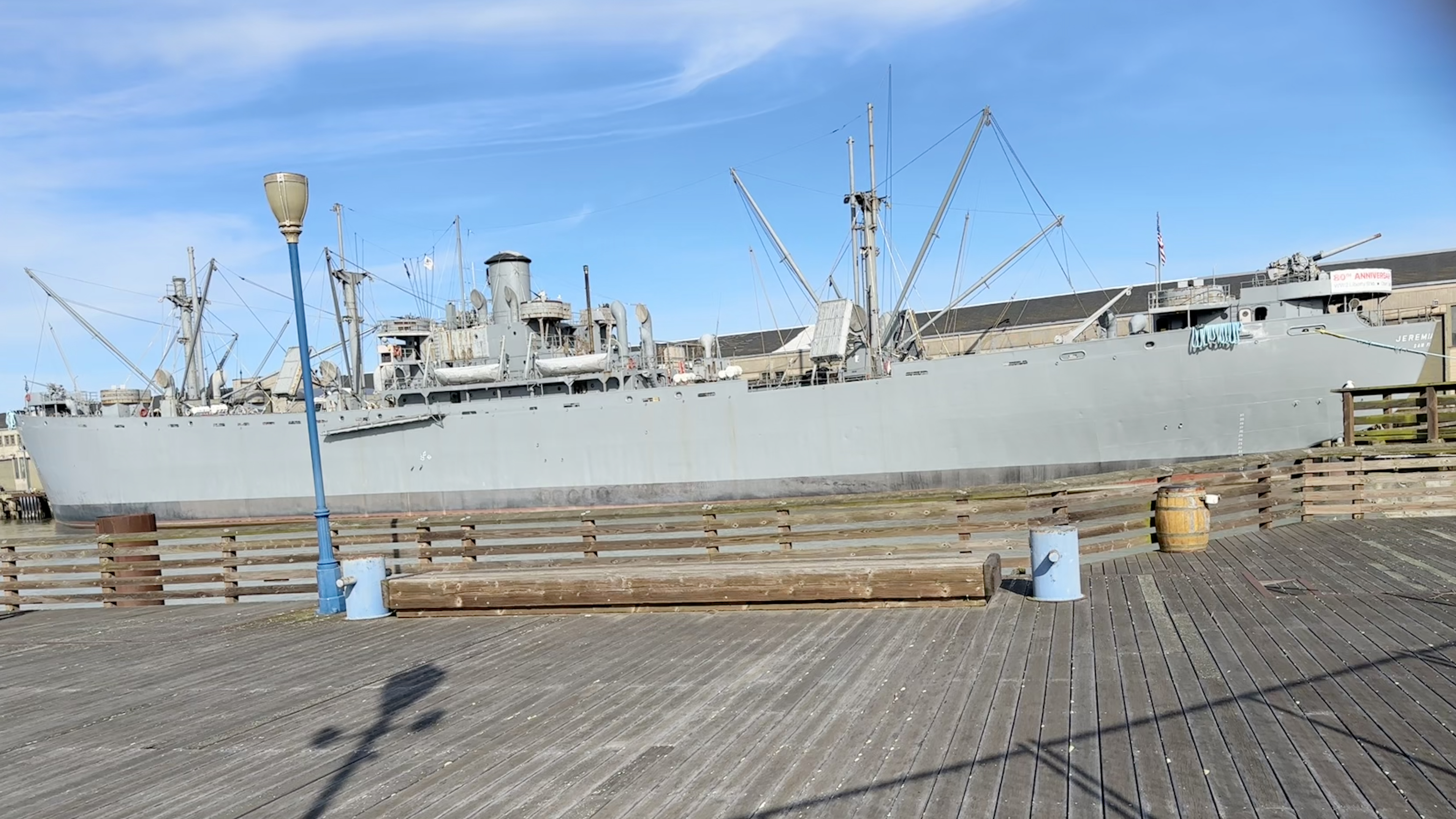
Jeremiah O'Brien at her new home at Pier 35, San Francisco, California

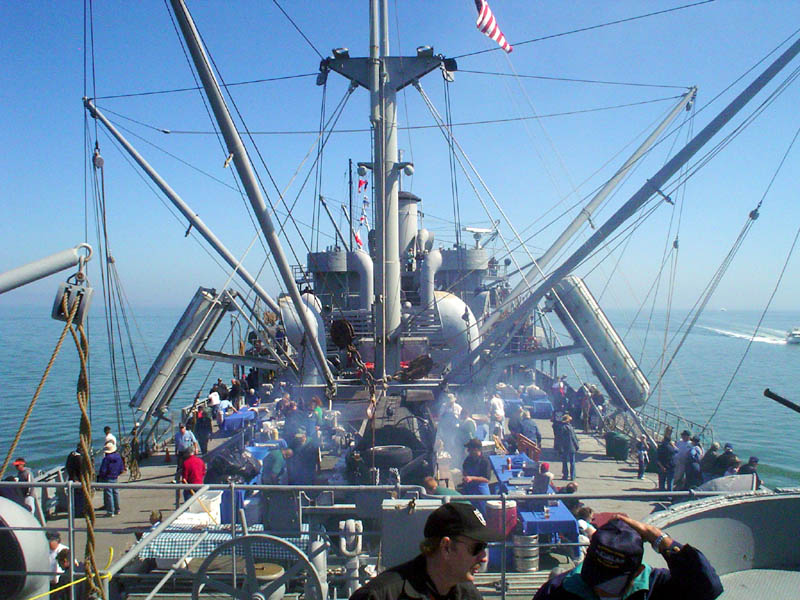
Jeremiah O'Brien under way in San Pablo Bay on 27 August 2005, as seen from the aft steering station

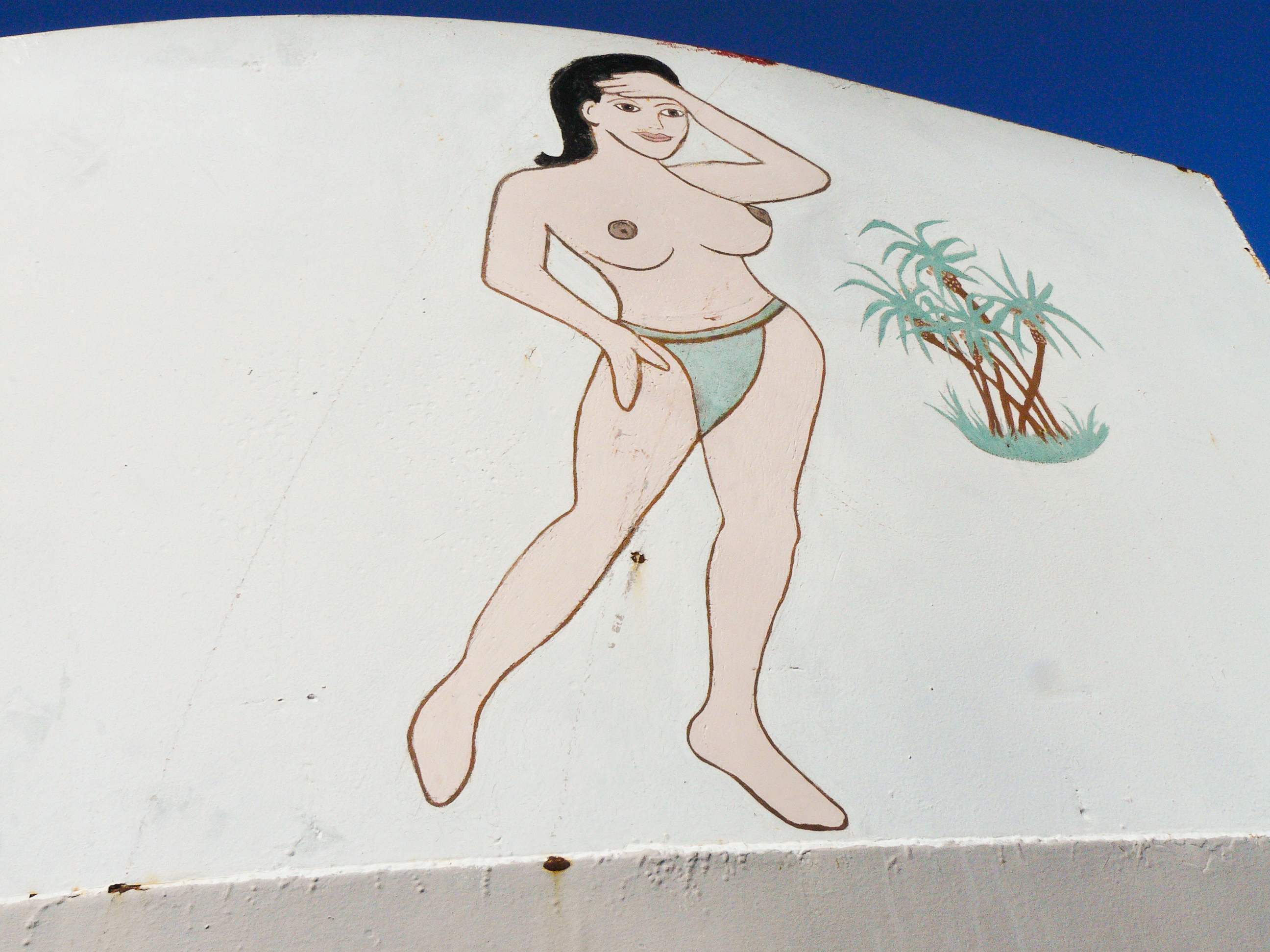
Polynesian fantasy pinups painted on Jeremiah O'Brien's bow for her maiden voyage. Found beneath later paint, they were restored during the ship's 1990s restoration.

Engine room status board seen while underway

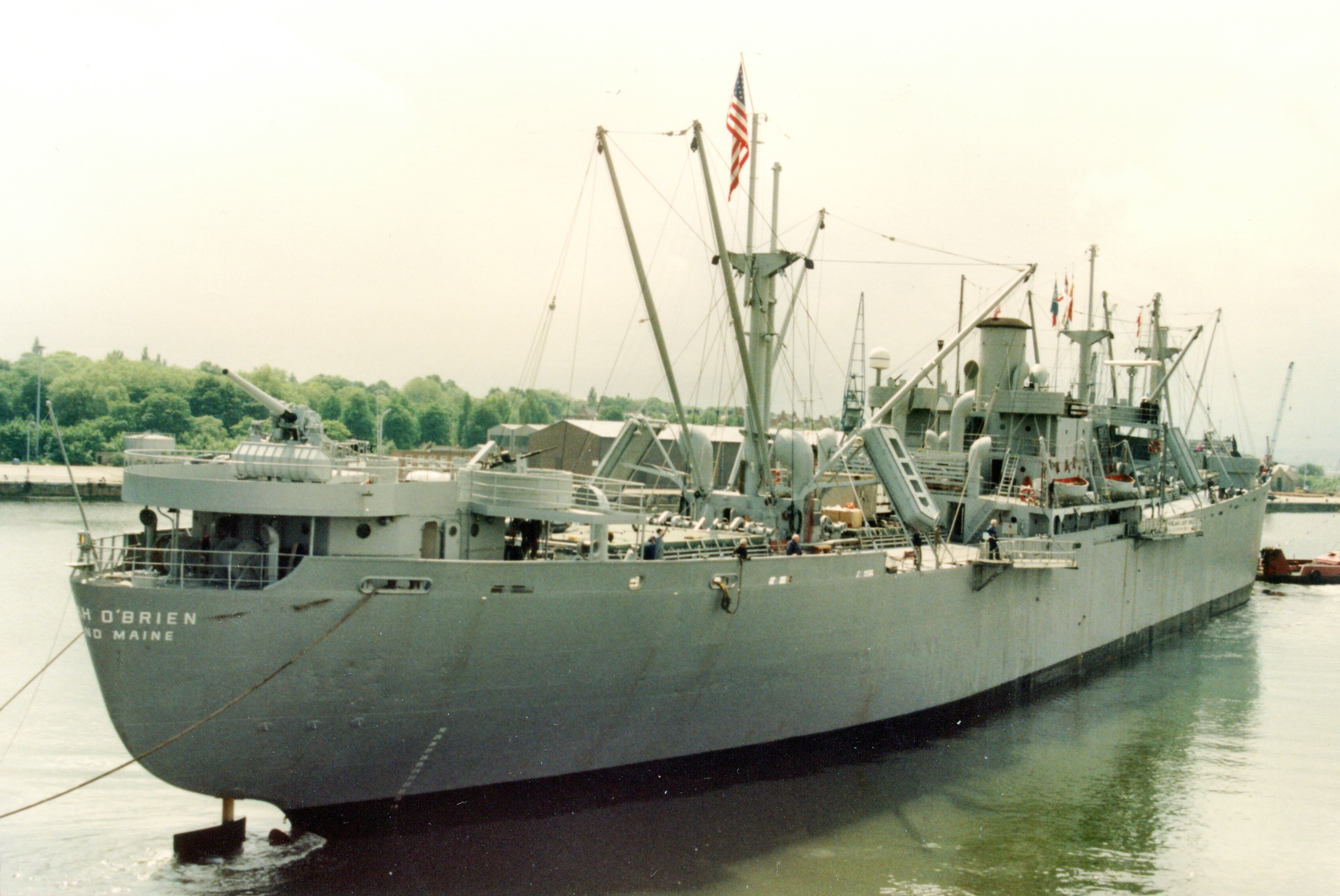
Jeremiah O'Brien arriving at Chatham (UK), 8 June 1994

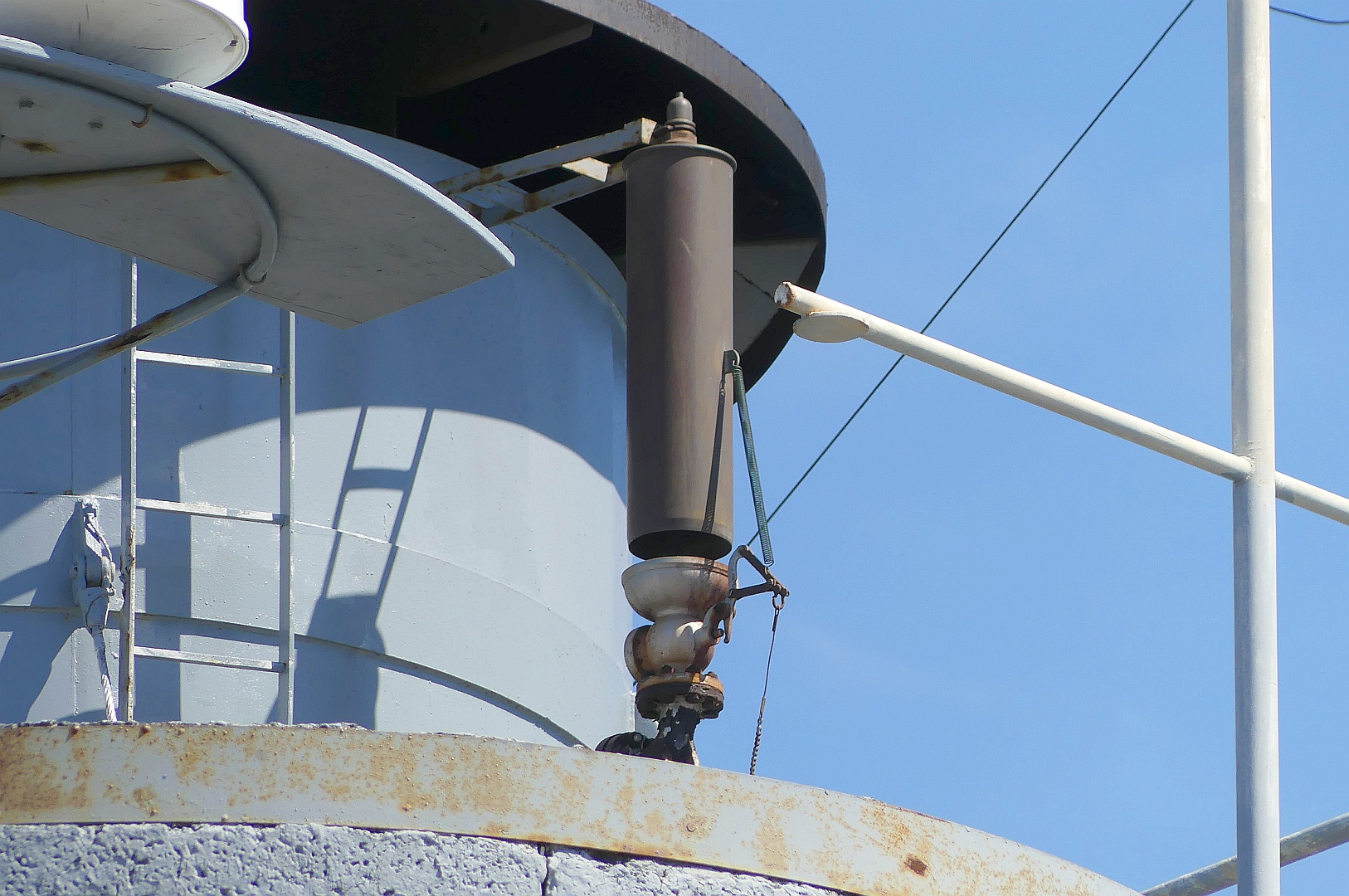
Jeremiah O'Brien steam whistle

== See also ==
- Liberty ship
- List of Liberty ships
- Nash – last surviving D-Day Army ship
- Victory ship
