= San Francisco Fire Department =

City government agency in California, USA

Coordinates: 37°47′N 122°25′W

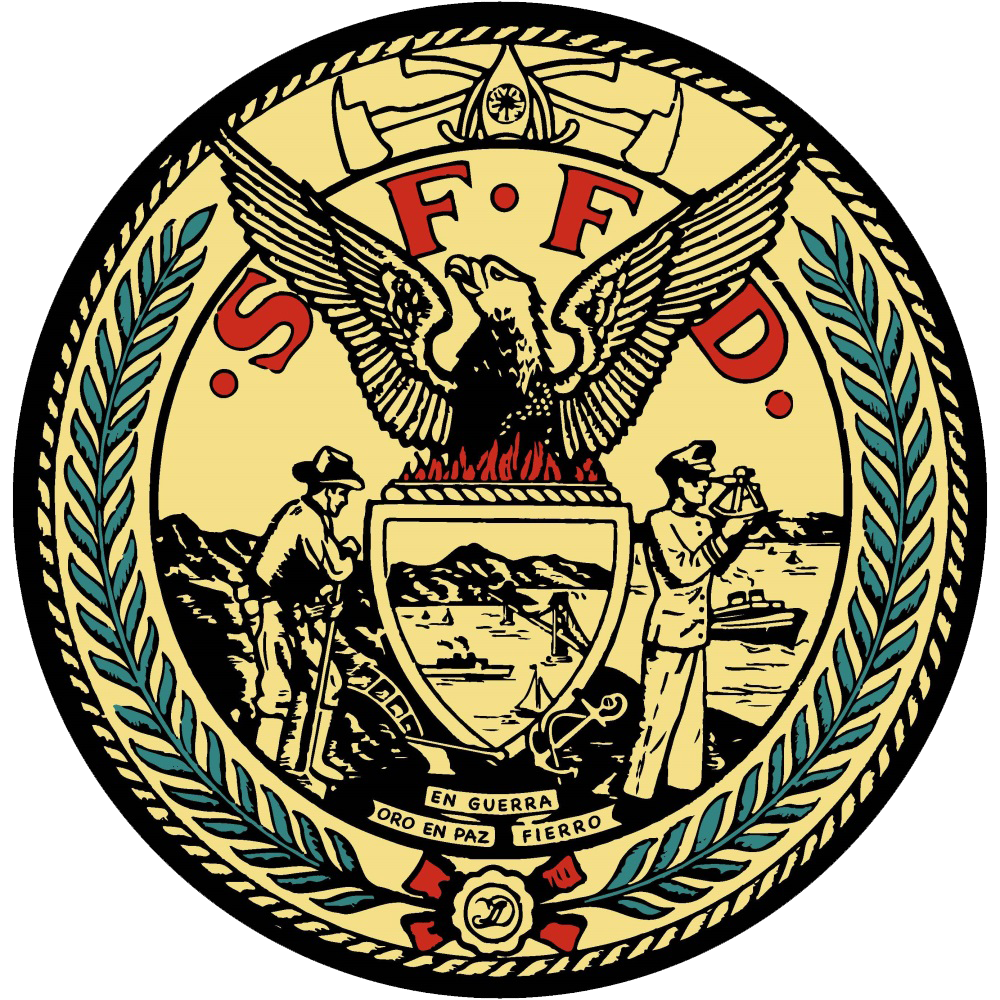

Operational area
- Country: United States
- State: California
- City: San Francisco

Agency overview
- Established: 12/25/1849-Volunteer Department 03/02/1866-Paid Department
- Annual calls: 135,091 (2015)
- Employees: 1,700 (2023)
- Annual budget: $526,500,000 (2025)
- Staffing: Career
- Fire chief: Dean Crispen
- EMS level: ALS & BLS
- IAFF: 798

Facilities and equipment
- Divisions: 2
- Battalions: 10
- Stations: 44 (Plus 3 at SFO)
- Engines: 44
- Trucks: 20
- Rescues: 2
- Ambulances: 31 ALS
- Tenders: 1
- HAZMAT: 1
- USAR: 1
- Airport crash: 4
- Wildland: 4 - Mini-Pumpers
- Fireboats: 2

Website
- Official website
- IAFF website

The San Francisco Fire Department (SFFD) provides firefighting, hazardous materials response services, technical rescue services and emergency medical response services to the City and County of San Francisco, California.

== History ==
=== Volunteer Department: 1849-1866 ===
The first great fire in San Francisco originated on Christmas Eve, 1849. By the time it burned itself out; fifty buildings were gone at a loss of $1,500,000. On Christmas night several citizens who had been firemen in the East met and formed fire companies. Heading the group was Frederick D. Kohler who was chosen as the first Chief. The Town Council held a special called meeting that afternoon and passed a resolution to organize a fire department. The resolution states, in part, “Therefore…..to protect the town against another such calamity by organizing fire companies”, and the San Francisco Fire Department was born. Town Council met on January 28, 1850, and formally elected Kohler as the first Chief Engineer of the San Francisco Fire Department.

=== Paid Department: 1866–Present ===
The legal basis for the origin of the Paid Department stemmed from legislation titled, "An Act to Establish a Paid Fire Department for the City and County of San Francisco." (Approval by the State Legislature was granted on March 2, 1866.) The Act provided for a five-man Board of Fire Commissioners to manage the affairs of the department.

The Fire Department consisted of a Chief Engineer, two Assistant Chiefs, one Corporation Yard Keeper and six steam fire engine companies. Each engine company was to have one foreman, one engineer, one driver, one fireman, and eight extra or "call" men. There were two Hook-and-Ladder Companies each consisting of one foreman, one driver, one tillerman and twelve extra men. Additionally, there were three Hose Companies, each consisting of one foreman, one driver, one steward and six extra men. During April 1866, the Board of Supervisors purchased four steam fire engines and one hose reel from the Amoskeag Manufacturing Company of Manchester, New Hampshire. This purchase was made at a cost of $17,655. In July of the same year the Supervisors also bought twenty-seven horses to provide motive power for the new and heavier equipment.

One of the first acts of the new Board of Fire Commissioners was to appoint the department executive officers. On October 6, 1866, Franklin E. R. Whitney was appointed chief engineer; H.W. Burckes, First Assistant Chief; and Charles H. Ackerson, Second Assistant Chief.

The department went into active operation on December 3, 1866, making it the first paid Fire Department West of the Mississippi. Daniel Hayes was appointed Superintendent of Steamers, Tom Sawyer, Corporation Yard Keeper, and John L. Durkee, Fire Marshal.

David S. Scannell, a former sheriff, became chief in 1871.

In 1906, the department was considered on a par with those of the larger cities on the East Coast, but found itself reduced to fighting the fire of 1906 in the quake aftermath with axes and shovels, as most of the city's water mains were broken and cisterns drained. Fire Chief Dennis T. Sullivan suffered mortal wounds in his home by a falling chimney early in the disaster and subsequently died in the hospital.

In 1955, Earl Gage Jr. was hired as the first Black firefighter. His work as director of community services is credited with diversifying the department.

== Operations ==
=== Fire Stations and Apparatus ===
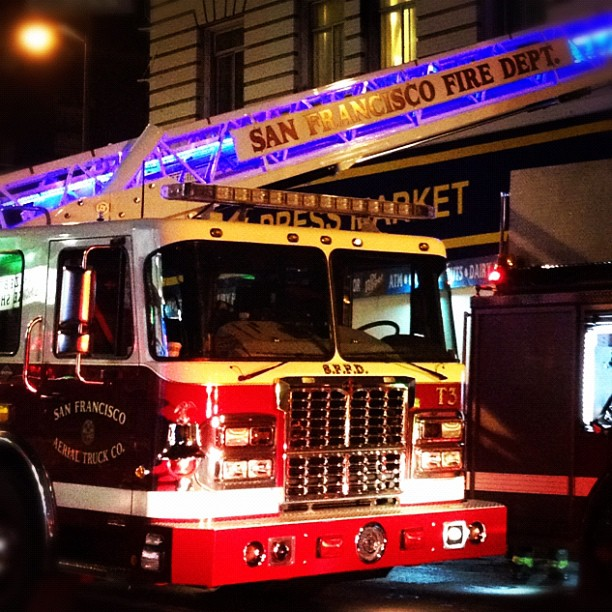
SFFD Truck 3 operating at a fire in the Tenderloin.

Below is a full listing of all fire station and company locations in the City & County of San Francisco according to Battalion and Division. As of 2019, SFFD has purchased several Ferrara Engines and Two New Ferrara Tillers. One Tiller is getting assigned to Truck 13 and the other tiller is still unknown

There are also three SFFD-operated fire stations located at the San Francisco International Airport in San Mateo County.

=== Emergency Medical Services ===
San Francisco Fire Department, in conjunction with American Medical Response and King American Ambulance, provide 911 emergency medical services in San Francisco. SFFD ALS Ambulances are dynamically deployed from Station 49 throughout the city to cover various districts as needed. Paramedic Supervisors, Rescue Captains, are stationed at Station 13 (Financial District), Station 31 (Richmond District), Station 11 (Mission District), Station 43 (Excelsior District). A 24/7 administrative Rescue Captain is stationed at Station 49.

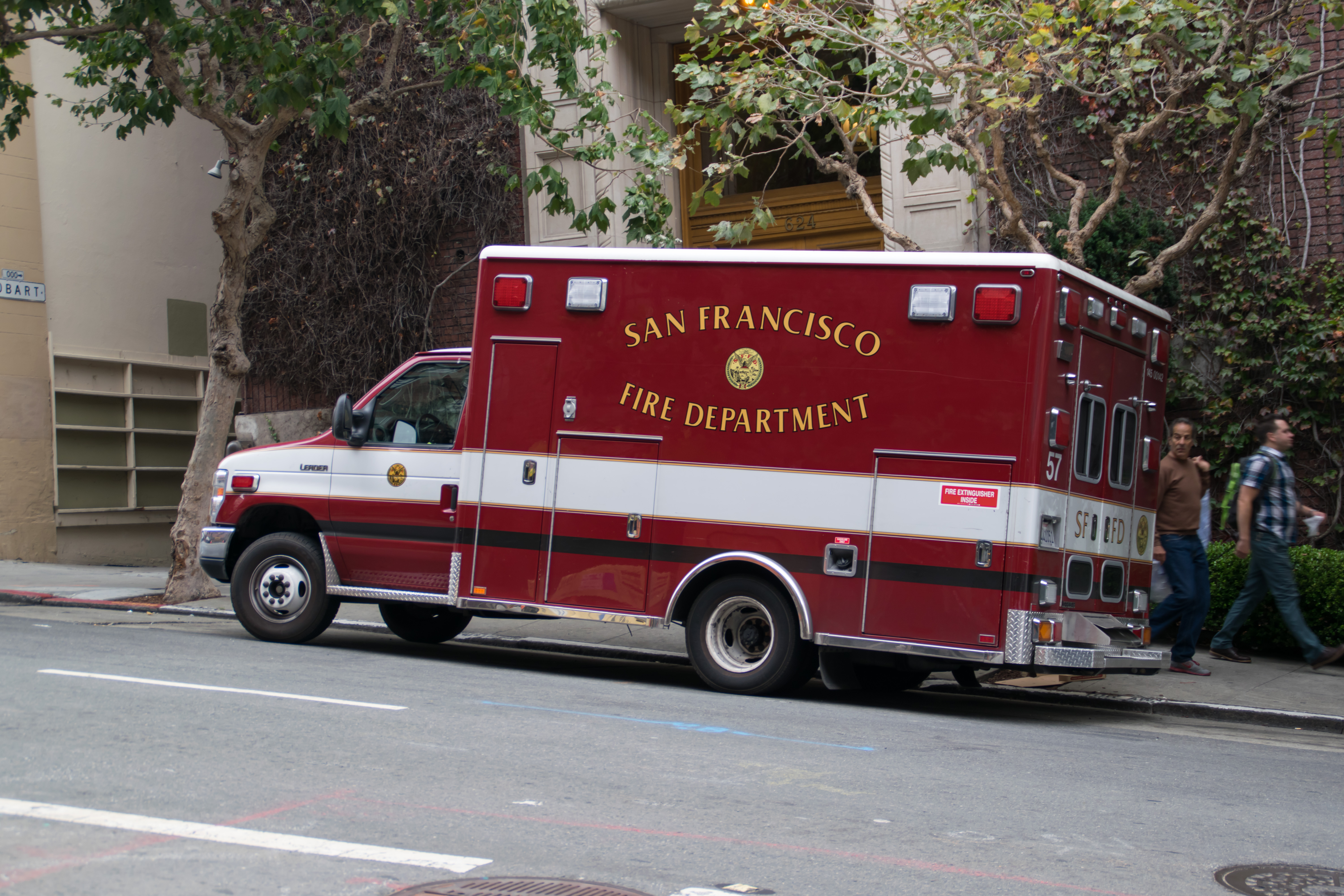
SFFD Ambulance in Downtown

=== Fireboats ===
The SFFD has two fireboats that are docked at Pier 22 1/2. Fireboat 1, the Phoenix, was constructed in 1954 and is fitted with three deck monitors, a water tower, a crane and two under pier monitors. The boat is 89 feet (27 m) and outfitted with two 500 horsepower (370 kW) engines giving a top speed of 15 knots (17 mph; 28 km/h).

A new 85-foot fireboat (Fireboat 3) was christened the St. Francis in October 2016.

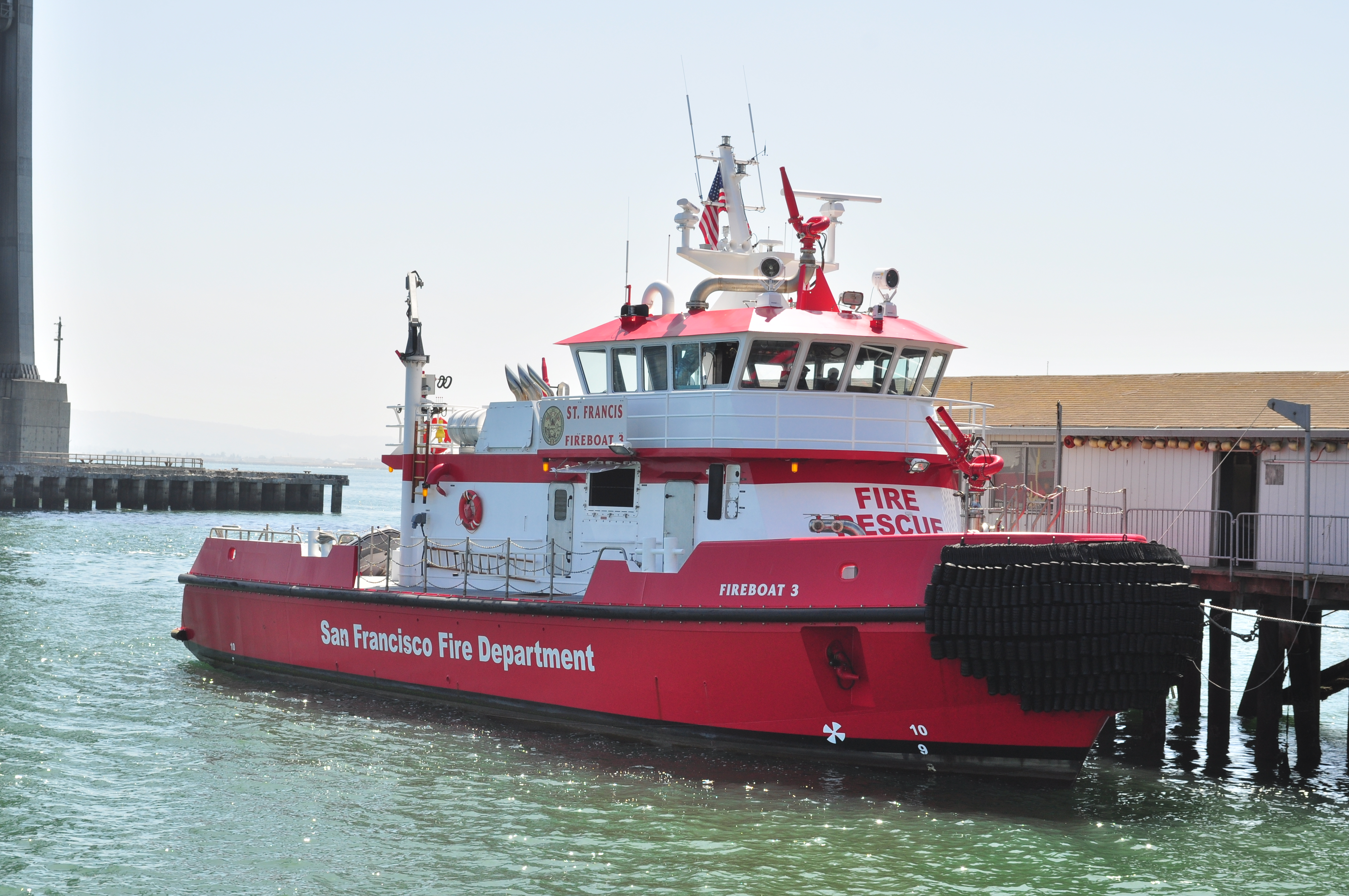
SFFD Fire Boat St. Francis at Station 35 underneath the Bay Bridge

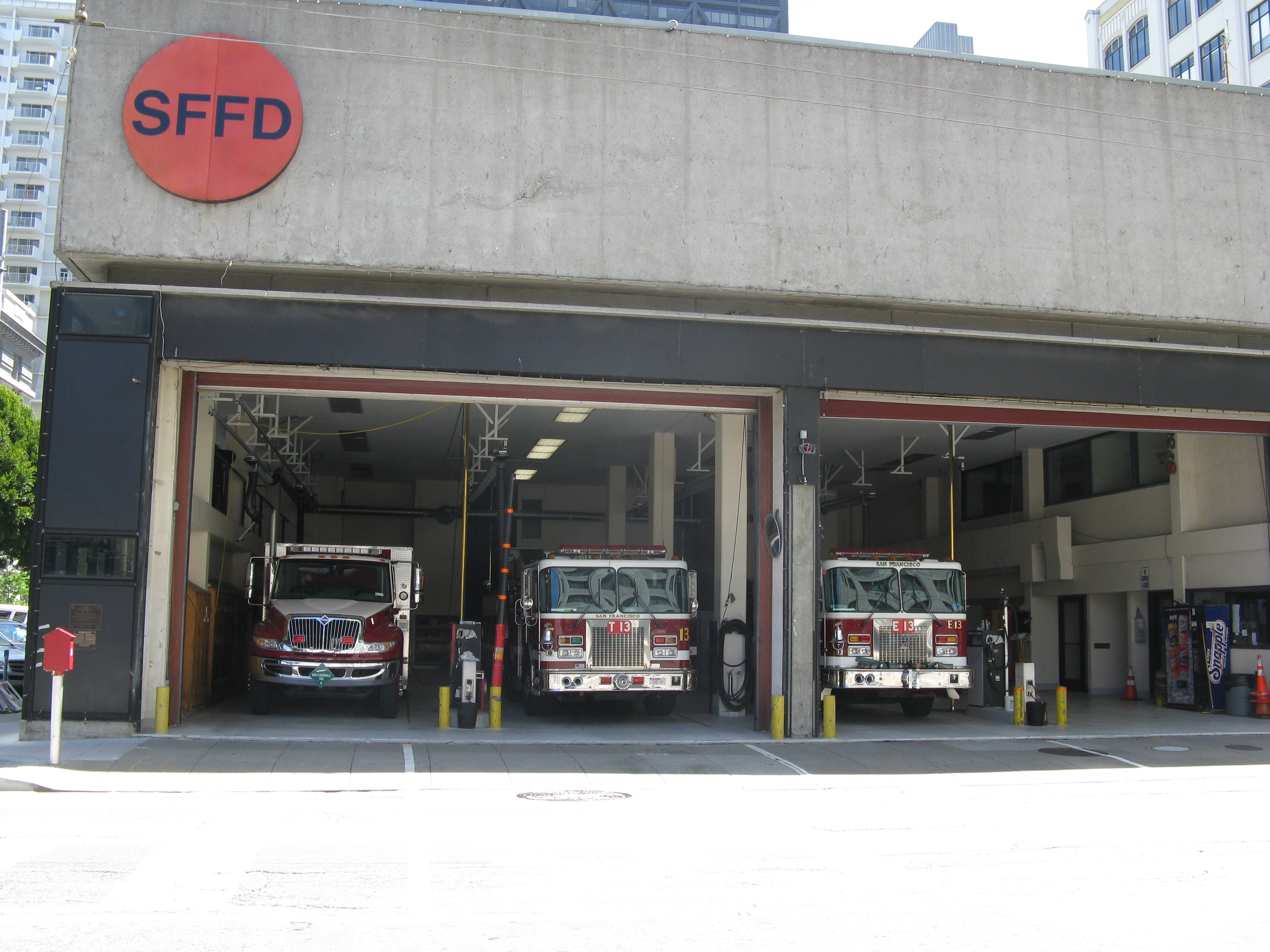
Fire Station 13 in the city's Financial District

Fire Station	Neighborhood	Engine Company	Truck Company	Special Unit	Battalion Chief Vehicle, Division Chief Vehicle, Rescue Captain Vehicle, EMS Chief Vehicle or EMS Operations Chief vehicle	Battalion	Division
1	South of Market	Engine 1	Truck 1	Rescue Squad 1		2	3
2	Chinatown	Engine 2	Truck 2		Battalion Chief 1	1	2
3	Tenderloin	Engine 3	Truck 3			4	3
4	Mission Bay	Engine 4	Truck 4			3	3
5	Fillmore District	Engine 5	Truck 5	Light Rescue 5	Division Chief 2	5	2
6	Castro	Engine 6	Truck 6	Decontamination Unit 1		2	3
7	Mission District	Engine 7	Truck 7	Light Rescue 7, Rescue Squad 2	Division Chief 3	6	3
8	South Beach	Engine 8	Truck 8		Battalion Chief 3	3	3
9	Dogpatch	Engine 9	Truck 9		Battalion Chief 10	10	3
10	Presidio Heights	Engine 10	Truck 10	CBRNE 1		5	2
11	Noe Valley	Engine 11	Truck 11		Battalion Chief 6, Rescue Captain 3	6	3
12	Haight-Ashbury	Engine 12	Truck 12			5	2
13	Financial District	Engine 13	Truck 13	CO2 Unit 1, Mobile Command 1	Rescue Captain 1	1	2
14	Outer Richmond	Engine 14	Truck 14	Cliff Rescue 14		7	2
15	Ingleside	Engine 15	Truck 15		Battalion Chief 9	9	3
16	Marina District, Marina Green; Fort Mason	Engine 16	Truck 16	Rescue Boat 1, Rescue Water Craft 1, Rescue Water Craft 2 (Kept at San Francisco Marina Craft Harbor)		4	2
17	Bayview-Hunters Point	Engine 17	Truck 17	Portable Hydrant Tender 17		10	3
18	Outer Parkside	Engine 18	Truck 18	Surf Rescue 18		8	2
19	Stonestown Galleria; Fort Funston	Engine 19	Truck 19	Cliff Rescue 19 Haz-Mat. Assist Trailer		9	3
20	Laguna Honda Reservoir / Twin Peaks	Engine 20		Mobile Air Unit 1, Mobile Air Unit 2, Pollution Control Unit, Mobile Air Support Trailer 1		8	2
21	Panhandle	Engine 21		Attack Hose Tender 21, Utility Unit 1	Battalion Chief 5	5	3
22	Sunset District	Engine 22		Portable Hydrant Tender 22		7	2
23	Outer Sunset District	Engine 23				8	2
24	Eureka Valley	Engine 24				6	3
25	Dog Patch	Engine 25		Mini-Pumper 25, Multi-Casualty Unit 1		10	3
26	Glen Park	Engine 26				6	3
28	North Beach	Engine 28				1	2
29	Design District	Engine 29		Decontamination Unit 2		2	3
31	Inner Richmond	Engine 31			Battalion Chief 7, Rescue Captain 2	7	2
32	College Hill	Engine 32		Mini-Pumper 32		6	3
33	Oceanview	Engine 33				9	3
34	Lands End	Engine 34		Surf Rescue 34		7	2
35	Pier 22 1/2	Engine 35		Phoenix Fireboat 1, St. Francis Fireboat 3, Rescue Boat 35		3	3
36	Civic Center	Engine 36		Haz-Mat. 1, Haz-Mat. 2	Battalion Chief 2	2	3
37	Potrero Hill	Engine 37				10	3
38	Pacific Heights	Engine 38			Battalion Chief 4	4	2
39	Forest Hill	Engine 39		Multi-Casualty Unit 2		9	3
40	Inner Parkside	Engine 40			Battalion Chief 8	8	2
41	Nob Hill	Engine 41				1	2
42	Portola	Engine 42		Portable Hydrant Tender 42		10	3
43	Excelsior	Engine 43		Mini-Pumper 43, OES Unit 248	Rescue Captain 4	9	3
44	Visitacion Valley	Engine 44		Mini-Pumper 44		10	3
48	Treasure Island	Engine 48	Truck 48	Rescue Ambulance 48, Hose Tender 48, Portable Hydrant Tender 48		3	3
49	India Basin			ALS Medic Units, BioMed Unit, Arson Unit, Logistics Units, Supply Units	EMS Chief, EMS Operations Chief, Rescue Captain	10	3
51	Presidio of San Francisco	Engine 51				4	2

=== SFO Stations ===
All apparatus at SFO go by the 'Rescue' call sign, whether Engine, Truck, ARFF Crash, Medic Unit, or Command SUV.

Fire Station Number	Location	Engine (Rescue) Unit	Truck (Rescue) Unit	Medic (Rescue) Unit	ARFF Crash (Rescue) Unit	Command (Rescue) Unit	Other Units
1	West end of airport	Rescue 31	Rescue 48	Rescue 91	Rescue 21	Rescue 67 (EMS Captain)	Rescue 81 (Multi-Casualty Unit)
2	Intersection of four runways				Rescue 22 Rescue 12		Rescue 61 (Utility), Airboat 51, RHIB, Rescue 55 (40' long Firefighting/Rescue Boat)
3	South end of airport	Rescue 33		Rescue 93	Rescue 23	Rescue 65 (Battalion)	SFO 3 & SFO 4 (Bike Medics)

=== Disbanded fire companies ===
Throughout the history of the San Francisco Fire Department there have been several fire companies which have been closed due to budget cuts and the restructuring of engine company numbers in 1972–1973.

- Engine Company 27 (356 7th St.): Disbanded July 1, 1976
- Engine Company 30 (1300 4th St.): Disbanded July 1, 1976
- Engine Company 45 (1348 45th Ave.): Disbanded September 26, 1972
- Engine Company 46 (441 12th Ave.): Disbanded May 16, 1972
- Engine Company 47 (499 41st Ave.): Disbanded May 25, 1973
- Engine Company 49 (2155 18th Ave.): Disbanded July 20, 1972
- Truck Company 20 (285 Olympia Way): Disbanded September 30, 1980
- Division 1 (530 Sansome St.): Disbanded January 2, 2002
- Battalion 5 (1443 Grove St.): August 30, 2003, Reinstated January 4, 2017
- Battalion 11 (798 Wisconsin St.): Disbanded July 1, 1970
- Salvage Company 1 (356 7th St.): Disbanded 1980
- Salvage Company 2 (115 Drumm St.): Disbanded 1975
- Salvage Company 3 (441 12th Ave.): Disbanded 1977
- Salvage Company 4 (299 Vermont St.): Disbanded 1986

== In popular culture ==
- The SFFD was the responding fire department to a major high-rise fire disaster in the 1974 film, The Towering Inferno. The film cast many actual firefighters from the department and used SFFD fire trucks during the filming. Fire Station 38 was also shown. The exterior shots were done at the Bank of America Building.
- Actor Steve McQueen was given a San Francisco Fire Department Honorary Battalion Chief badge #33 with ID in recognition for his accurate portrayal of San Francisco Battalion Fire Chief Mike O'Halloran.
- The SFFD was also used in the Dirty Harry film series, particularly Rescue Squad 2 in Dirty Harry.
- When a veteran SFFD firefighter is killed and Adrian Monk is blinded in a mysterious attack at a firehouse in the Monk episode "Mr. Monk Can't See a Thing", Monk must rely on his other senses to solve the bizarre case. In the course of the episode, he finds that the killer came to the firehouse to steal a fireman's coat and even finds that the man who blinded him had just beforehand killed a woman a few blocks away and set fire to her house (that fire was the one the engine company had been responding to when the murder at the firehouse took place). The depicted fire station, Fire Station 53, is a fictitious station. The exterior of the station was represented by Fire Station 1 of the Los Angeles Fire Department.
- The SFFD appears as the San Fierro Fire Department in Grand Theft Auto San Andreas. Players are able to take a firetruck and respond to emergencies around the city.
- In the Monk novel series by Lee Goldberg, Joe Cochran, Natalie Teeger's occasional lover, is an SFFD firefighter, making appearances in the novels Mr. Monk Goes to the Firehouse, Mr. Monk and the Two Assistants, and Mr. Monk in Outer Space.
- The SFFD was featured in two Emergency! television movies in 1978 and 1979, where L.A. County firefighter/paramedics Gage and DeSoto run calls with the firefighters of Rescue Squad 2.
- The NBC Television show Trauma followed the fictional lives of SFFD paramedics, EMTs and flight medics.
- The department is featured in the 1985 James Bond film A View to a Kill. After San Francisco City Hall is set ablaze by the villainous Max Zorin in an attempt to kill Bond, the SFFD arrives on scene and assists Roger Moore's character in escaping the burning building and then ultimately "borrows" a SFFD ladder truck in order to outrun the police officers chasing him on the suspicion that his character set the blaze.
- The CBS television series Rescue 911's episode #107, the 4th segment featured the San Francisco Fire Department responding to an apartment fire. In one of the scenes, sparks shoot over a firetruck from a broken wire from a powerline. The station was Station #9, built in 1915.

== See also ==
- North American fire hose coupler incompatibilities
