= Governor Irwin (fireboat) =

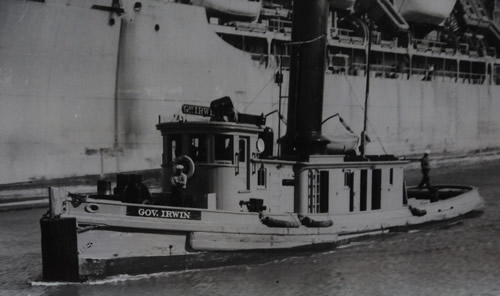
The Governor Irwin was steam-powered.

The Governor Irwin was a fireboat operated in San Francisco, California from 1878 to 1909. She was steam-powered. She participated in the recovery after the 1906 San Francisco earthquake and fire, and was owned by the State of California. The boat could only pump a modest 1,000 U.S. gal (3,800 L) per minute.

The Governor Markham, commissioned in 1895, was a twin of the Governor Irwin.

Specifications
Length:	86 feet (26 m)
Beam:	19.5 feet (5.9 m)
Draft:	10.5 feet (3.2 m)
Displacement:	80 tons
