= Boleslaus Goral =

Polish-American priest, educator and editor (1876–1960)

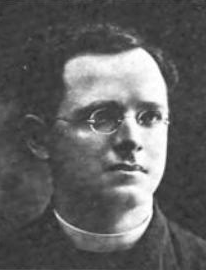
- Born: Boleslaus Edward Goral; March 12, 1876; Koenigsdorf, Prussian Poland
- Died: March 31, 1960 (aged 84); Milwaukee, Wisconsin, United States of America
- Burial place: St. Adalbert Cemetery, Milwaukee
- Education: SS. Cyril and Methodius Seminary; St. Francis Seminary
- Occupations: Clergyman, educator, editor

Boleslaus Edward Goral or Góral (March 12, 1876 – March 31, 1960) was a Polish-American priest, professor, and newspaper editor.

== Biography ==
Boleslaus Goral was born in Koenigsdorf, Prussian Poland on March 12, 1876. He immigrated to the U.S. in 1889 and attended SS. Cyril and Methodius Seminary in Detroit, Michigan and St. Francis Seminary near Milwaukee, Wisconsin. Father Goral was ordained on June 18, 1899, and, as a skilled linguist, originally served as a professor at the seminary. He spoke fluent Polish, German, Latin, and Greek. He wrote a book on punctuation in the Polish language as well as an article on Charles Antoniewicz for the Catholic Encyclopedia.

At this time, a bitter conflict was taking place between the Milwaukee Archdiocese and the Polish language Kuryer Polski daily newspaper which was advocating an ethnic Polish Bishop for the city. In 1906, Father Goral was named to head up the Nowiny Polskie, an alternative to the Kuryer which would have an editorial stance more sympathetic to the official positions of the Archdiocese.

While Archbishop Sebastian Messmer denied direct involvement with the start up of Nowiny, it was felt by many that the paper was simply a mouthpiece for the official position of the Archdiocese. Following a rather slow start, Father Goral became concerned about the viability of the new paper and asked Archbishop Messmer for more open support from the church hierarchy. Messmer sent a letter to the Milwaukee clergy saying that support for the paper was "absolutely necessary" and asked them to solicit subscriptions from the pulpit. Letters published in Nowiny from the Archdiocese made it clear that the Church in Milwaukee fully supported the paper and official endorsements came even from Pope Pius X in Rome. Nowiny's circulation eventually attracted enough readers to become a daily in 1907, and an effective counterpoint to the Kuryer. The conflict between the two Polish papers became increasingly bitter and very personal. Father Goral's personal morals were attacked by the Kuryer and the stress on him became unbearable.

In 1908, in a controversial move, Father Goral was assigned as pastor at St. Vincent de Paul parish on Mitchell St. Fr. Goral had complained that his health had suffered during the press "war" between the Nowiny and the Kuryer. Father Goral stayed at St. Vincent but one year, and was then transferred to St. Hyacinth.

Discord within this parish had previously required the transfer of Father Hyacinth Gulski from St. Hyacinth, which he had founded, to St. Hedwig's parish on Milwaukee's east side. Financial irregularities at Hyacinth had caused a major rift between parishioners and the financial administrators for the parish. Goral stilled the troubled waters at St. Hyacinth and brought the rival factions together. His mixture of kindness tempered with firmness became known as "Jackowo gora" (St. Hyacinth on top). Fr. Goral would eventually become a member of the board of directors of St. Francis Seminary. He would remain as pastor of St. Hyacinth until 1958 but lived in the St. Hyacinth Rectory until his death in 1960. He was awarded the title of Right Reverend Monsignor in 1921.

== See also ==
- Hyacinth (Jacek) Gulski
- Michał Kruszka
- Wacław Kruszka
- Kuryer Polski
