= Hyacinth (Jacek) Gulski =

American Roman Catholic priest (1847–1911)

The Right Reverend Monsignor Hyacinth (Jacek) Gulski
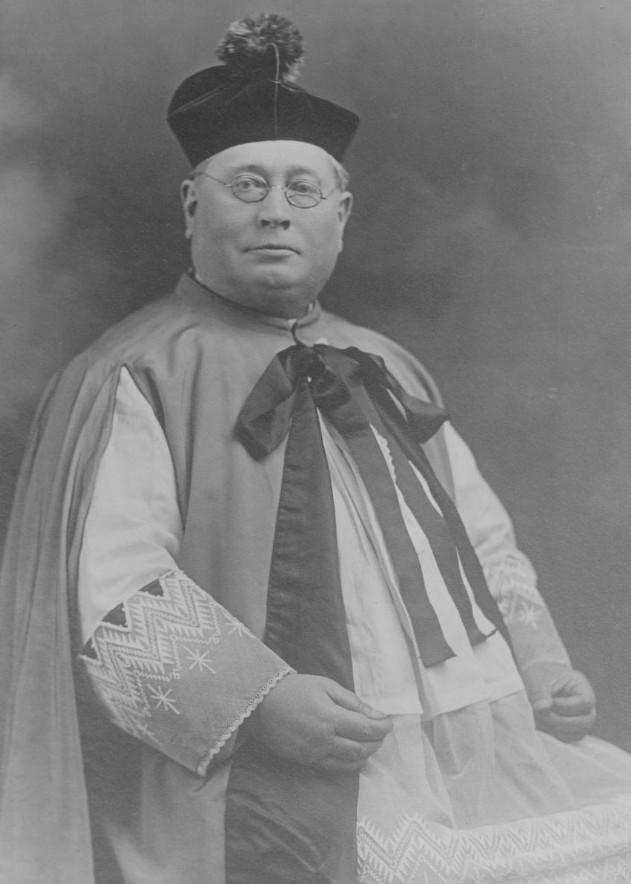
- Diocese: Roman Catholic Diocese of Chełmno (1873-1874), Roman Catholic Archdiocese of Milwaukee (1874-1911)

Orders
- Ordination: September 21, 1873

Personal details
- Born: Jacek Gulski; November 28, 1847 Chełmno, Prussian Poland
- Died: December 24, 1911 (aged 64) Milwaukee, Wisconsin, U.S.
- Buried: St. Adalbert Cemetery, Milwaukee
- Occupation: Clergyman
- Education: Chełmno Gymnasium, Chełmno Seminary

Hyacinth Gulski (November 28, 1847 – December 24, 1911) was a pioneer Polish-American Roman Catholic priest. He served as Archdiocesan Consultor to the Roman Catholic Archdiocese of Milwaukee.

== Biography ==
Gulski was born in Chełmno, then part of West Prussia in 1847, son of Antoni Gulski (musician) and Anna Schewa, his birth name was Franciscus Joannes. In 1866 he joined the Franciscans and was ordained at Laki, German partition of Poland, entering the priesthood on September 21, 1873. That same year, his friary was closed as a result of the Kulturkampf. Gulski spent two years in hiding and eventually fled in 1875 via Antwerp to the United States, where he was offered a pastorship in Berlin, Wisconsin. The following year, he was transferred to St. Stanislaus Catholic Church in Milwaukee, Wisconsin, the principal Polish parish in the city.

Under Gulski's guidance, "St. Stan" grew; a new US$4000 pipe organ was added to the church and its spires covered in copper. During his pastorate, in 1882 a record 96 marriages were performed in the church. The church was now serving 400 families, an increase from the original 30. A new rectory was built that same year. Eventually, even this large church could no longer cope with the numbers wishing to attend mass.

Gulski left St. Stanislaus to organize the new St. Hyacinth parish, which was located just west of St. Stanislaus. Many were surprised by this move, as obviously St. Stanislaus was a prestigious posting for a priest. However, Father Gulski had a missionary zeal to build houses of worship for his beloved Polish community in Milwaukee. A location was chosen on West Becher and South 15th Streets to construct the new church with the support of Archbishop Michael Heiss. In addition, a school, hall, rectory, and convent were built on the site. Although not as elegant as St. Stanislaus, the parishioners felt the austere lines were conducive to prayer and meditation. The church, seated 800 worshipers, was blessed on April 1, 1883.

Gulski was a gifted orator, and many of Milwaukee's south side residents preferred to attend mass at St. Hyacinth because of his beautiful homilies. Gulski's gift for singing earned him the nickname of the "Polish Nightingale". By 1888, the two parishes on the south side could no longer cope with the increased population. Gulski was instrumental in organizing the new parishes of St. Vincent's in 1888, and SS. Cyril and Methodius in 1893, to accommodate the rising number of Polish speaking worshipers.

Gulski convinced the Polish Sisters of St. Felix of Cantalice to come to Milwaukee and establish an orphanage there. Ground was broken in 1907, and the following year 46 boys and 39 girls were welcomed at St. Joseph Orphan Asylum. Other Polish parishes in Milwaukee offered shelter to orphans, as well as to young ladies with unplanned pregnancies who were often rejected by their families. It was felt that a Polish orphanage was necessary to preserve the ethnic heritage of the children so that they would not be lost to the American cultural "melting pot". For his efforts, Gulski was honored with the title of Monsignor.

Gulski presented the city of Milwaukee with a large statue of Tadeusz Kościuszko for Kosciusko Park that was paid for by private donations. Eventually internal problems emerged in his parish. Discord in his beloved "Jackowo" in 1909 led to his transfer to St. Hedwig's (Milwaukee) for two years. He was replaced at St. Hyacinth by Boleslaus Goral. Death claimed Gulski in 1911. Many believed that by having been forced to leave his beloved St. Hyacinth parish, which he had built from the ground up, Gulski died of a broken heart.

== See also ==
- St. Stanislaus Catholic Church (Milwaukee)
- Boleslaus Goral
- St. Hedwig's (Milwaukee)
