= Roller Life =

2016 film

- Theatrical poster
- Directed by: Michael Brown
- Produced by: Anna Wilson
- Starring: Sara Hackbarth; Shannon Huot
- Production company: Hungry Lion Productions
- Distributed by: Hungry Lion Productions
- Release date: October 19, 2016
- Running time: 82 minutes
- Country: United States
- Language: English

Roller Life is a 2016 American documentary film executive produced and directed by Michael Brown. The film's story follows the Brewcity Bruisers, a flat track roller derby league that belongs to the Women's Flat Track Derby Association, for a full season. The film follows around eight roller derby athletes and captures the essence of their lives both on and off the track. The documentary looks into misconceptions of the sport and covers the full action of the roller derby season. Roller Life premiered at the historic Oriental Theatre on October 19, 2016. It was chosen as an official selection to the 2017 Milwaukee film festival. It was added to Amazon Prime's Video streaming service on November 21, 2017.

== Cast ==
(All as themselves)

- Sara Hackbarth
- Shannon Huot
- Rebecca Berkshire
- Patrice Roder
- Maggie Benavides
- Patricia Frank
- Cara Wisth
- Angela Johnstad
- Deanna Danger
- Michael Brown

== Film Festivals ==
Film Festival	Location	Category
Milwaukee Film Festival	Milwaukee, Wisconsin	Cream City Cinema
Hollywood Independent Film Festival	West Hollywood, California	Documentary Feature
Great Lakes International Film Festival	Erie, Pennsylvania	Documentary Feature
Eau Claire World Film Festival	Eau Claire, Wisconsin	Documentary Feature
Silver Screen Film Festival	Tampa Bay, Florida	Documentary Feature
