= East Side, Milwaukee =

Area of Milwaukee, Wisconsin, United States

The East Side of Milwaukee
- Neighborhood
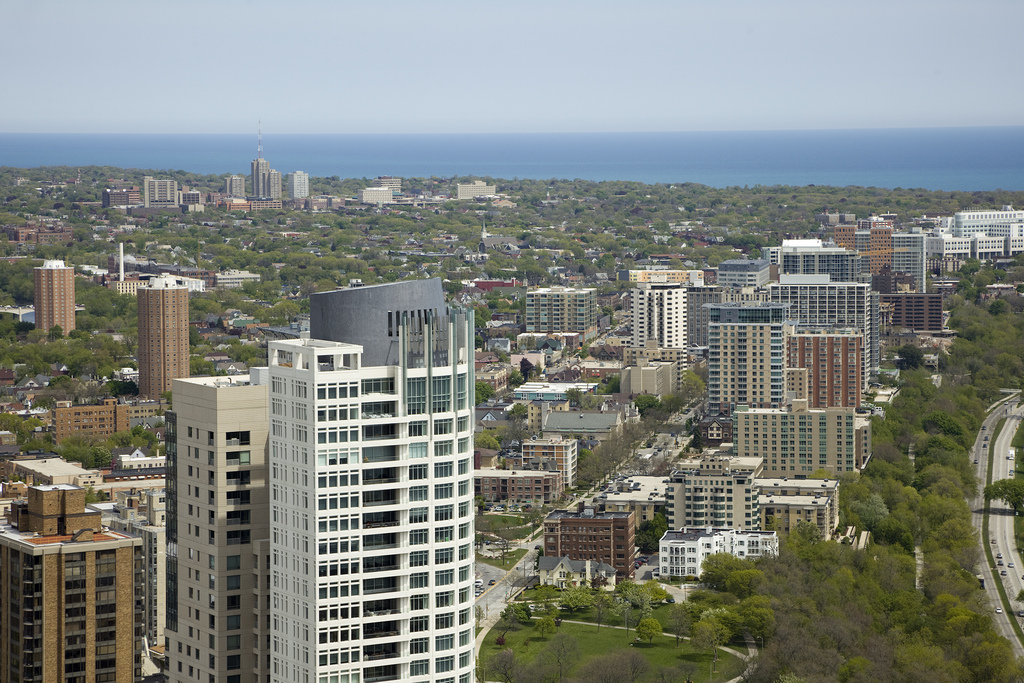
- Milwaukee East Side from above in 2012
- Interactive map of The East Side of Milwaukee
- Coordinates: 43°03′36″N 87°53′08″W
- Country: United States
- State: Wisconsin

Government
  - Type: Milwaukee Common Council
  - Mayor: Cavalier Johnson
  - Alderman: Alex Brower

Area
  - Total: 3.0 sq mi (7.7 km^{2})
- Elevation: 617 ft (188 m)

Population (2020)
  - Total: 45,708
  - Density: 15,236/sq mi (5,883/km^{2})
- Time zone: UTC-6 (EST)
  - Summer (DST): UTC-5 (EDT)
- ZIP code(s): 53202, 53211
- Area code: 414
- Website: https://www.theeastside.org/

The East Side is a district of Milwaukee, Wisconsin consisting of several neighborhoods encompassing an area just north of Downtown Milwaukee to the village of Shorewood, bordered by the Milwaukee River to the west and Lake Michigan to the east. The area encompasses residences, museums, bars, shops, theaters, live music clubs and the University of Wisconsin–Milwaukee campus.

== History ==
Concerted settlement in the East Side neighborhood began during the 1880s, with well-to-do settlers with upper-class roots developing the East Side along Lake Michigan. The location had early appeal due to its location atop the bluffs overlooking Lake Michigan. Many of the extravagant homes are still standing today, particularly around the North Point section. Away from the lake, workers for the nearby tanneries settled in, creating an ethnically diverse area over the decades. By the early 1870s East Brady Street began to emerge as a center of Polish commerce with a concentration of working class Polish immigrants living in the surrounding neighborhood. In the 1920s the ethnic focus of the neighborhood began to shift to Italian, reaching its peak in the 1950s.

In 1960s and 1970s, the Lower East Side neighborhood and Brady Street became Milwaukee's counterculture and hippie epicenter. After blight began to set in during the early 1980s, a Business Improvement District was formed on Brady Street in an effort to reverse perceptions of decline. The business area has since seen revitalization and has welcomed a more diverse array of businesses. In addition to a traditional Italian bakery and grocery, a variety of ethnic restaurants and local taverns dot this popular commercial street along with a mix of traditional and eclectic businesses, many in restored historic buildings. Prospect Avenue, which was once home to many of Milwaukee's grand mansions, saw several of the historic structures demolished and replaced with high-rise residential structures such as Landmark on the Lake.

== Culture ==
The East Side is considered by some as Milwaukee's melting pot, with a mix of hipsters, hippies, college students and young professionals converging in the area's diverse restaurants, bars and stores. The area is also known for its historic architecture, such as St. Hedwig's, on the corner of Humboldt Avenue and Brady Street. With the exception of St. Hedwig's, the buildings of the area reflect the styles popular in Milwaukee, including the Italianate, Queen Anne, Classical Revival, and the German Renaissance Revival.

Oriental Theatre, a movie palace still in operation, was built in 1927. The University of Wisconsin–Milwaukee was established in 1956, replacing the smaller Downer Avenue Teachers College. Brady Street became the focus of Milwaukee's counter-culture in the 1960s, with Brady Street Days, head shops, Glorioso's Italian Market, several bars and Kitchen Sink Press, one of the world's largest underground comics publishers. In recent decades, the area has seen housing assessments climb and issues with gentrification worsen. Commerce continues to grow in different parts of the area as a result of continued private and developer investments. The Downer Theatre is another historic neighborhood cinema that plays independent films.

Milwaukee's East Side is home to several museums and galleries including the Villa Terrace Decorative Arts Museum, Charles Allis Art Museum, Emile H. Mathis Art Gallery at the University of Wisconsin-Milwaukee, the Green Gallery, and the Jewish Museum Milwaukee.

== Neighborhoods ==
The East Side contains several neighborhoods including the Lower East Side, Murray Hill, Northpoint, Lake Park, Riverside Park, the Upper East Side, Cambridge Woods and Downer Woods. The neighborhoods to the north and east are traditionally more residential and affluent while those to the south and west take on a more urban and mixed-use identity.

=== The Lower East Side ===
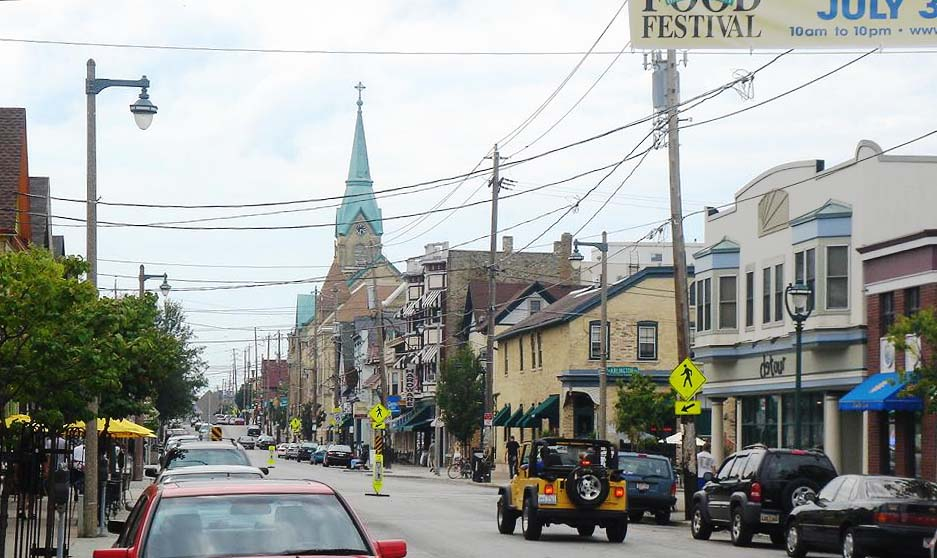
St. Hedwig's Roman Catholic Church in the distance off of Brady

The Lower East Side is a neighborhood North of Downtown and East of Riverwest. It is bounded by the Milwaukee River on the west, Lake Michigan on the east, North Avenue on the north and State Street on the south. Brady Street itself runs west from Prospect Avenue (overlooking the Lake) to Water Street.

In the 1880s, Brady Street became a commercial district of Yankee and German owned shops. Regano's Roman Coin, one of the original Pabst tied house taverns, is still located on Brady Street, though the vintaged beer signs outside read "Blatz". This tavern was built in 1890 and is unique in that it was designed by architect Otto Strack, who also designed Milwaukee's Pabst Theater. Today, Lower East Side is filled with coffee houses, nightclubs, restaurants, vintage clothing, and thrift stores.

Lower East Side is often associated with being once the heart of Milwaukee's Italian community, even being called "Milwaukee's Little Italy". But before World War II, it was largely home to Polish immigrants. In fact, historic St. Hedwig's Roman Catholic Church, a long-time Polish church, which was built in 1871, stands at the corner of Brady Street and Humboldt Avenue. In the 1960s, Italians and other assimilated groups began to leave the neighborhood for the suburbs, while the hippies and other bohemians moved in. The 1980s saw blight, neglect and decay, but now the area has been revitalized and has become a model for New Urbanism.

=== East Village ===
The East Village is a term for the Lower East Side area on the east bank of the Milwaukee River north of Brady Street, from Humboldt Avenue east to Warren Avenue. Most of the neighborhood makes up the Brewers Hill Historic District, which is listed on the National Register of Historic Places.

It includes Caesar's Park, Pulaski Playground, and Wolski's Tavern. The area was a traditional working-class neighborhood inhabited by Polish-Americans, including many Kashubians; the architecture includes a number of Polish flats and other forms of modest housing.

=== Murray Hill ===
Murray Hill is located adjacent to the University of Wisconsin–Milwaukee within the larger East Side neighborhood. It is bounded by Downer Avenue on the east, Oakland Avenue on the west, Hartford Avenue on the north, and Bradford Avenue and North Avenue on the south. It is primarily a residential neighborhood with housing dating to the early decades of the 20th century, primarily bungalows, two-family duplexes, and larger apartment buildings. The neighborhood is bisected by Newberry Blvd. which connects parks on Lake Michigan (Lake Park) and the Milwaukee River (Riverside Park). Murray Hill is home to both a student population and many long-term residents. The neighborhood has an active neighborhood group, the Murray Hill Neighborhood Association. The childhood home of famous industrial designer Brooks Stevens was in Murray Hill.

=== Cambridge Woods ===
Cambridge Woods - sometimes called Cambridge Heights - is a small, vibrant Eastside Milwaukee neighborhood nestled between Riverside Park, the Milwaukee River Greenway with its Oak Leaf Recreational Trail, the Village of Shorewood’s Hubbard Park, and the University of Wisconsin-Milwaukee. It is primarily residential in nature though some businesses exist along Oakland Avenue which is also home to the Milwaukee County Transit System Green Line.

Mostly developed in the early 20th century, the neighborhood has a mix of single-family, duplex, condo, and multi-family units. Homes are eclectic in style, ranging from Queen Anne to bungalows, including the legendary “boathouse" a home located along the Oak Leaf Trail that closely resembles a boat. The area has a high walkability rating like many of Milwaukee's pre-war neighborhoods. The area has a large population of students from neighboring University of Wisconsin-Milwaukee which has at times been a source of tension with long-time residents.

=== Riverside Park ===
Riverside Park was created in 1890 as one of three Milwaukee County Parks designed by Frederick Law Olmsted. It once sloped into a tree-lined valley; on the northern edge there was a limestone tunnel into the park. There was also a sledding hill, a waterfall, a pavilion and, on the river, skating, swimming, fishing and boating. A large portion of the topography of the park was flattened in the 1970's for an addition to Riverside University High School. Pollution from Milwaukee's industrial era gradually made the river unfit for swimming, and invasive plants took over as maintenance declined due to repeated budget cuts by the County Government. In 1991, the Urban Ecology Center was created and began a major campaign to revitalize the park and restore it to its former glory. Environmental Scientist Dr. Else Ankel created the outdoor educational program. Since its conception, crime has decreased significantly, a paved bike trail known as the Oak Leaf Trail was constructed and the river has once again become a desirable destination.

=== Northpoint ===
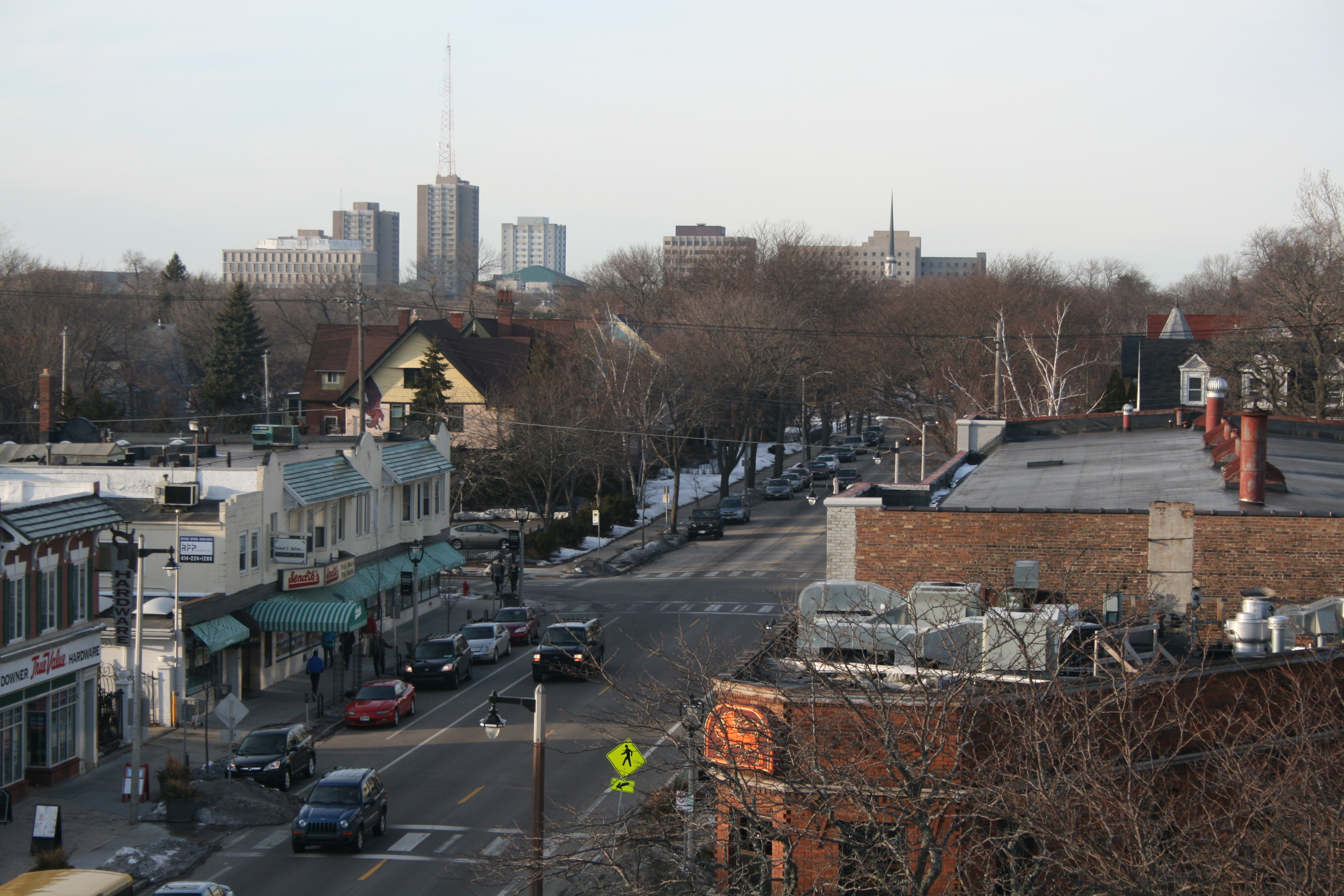
Looking northwest along North Downer Avenue on Milwaukee's Upper East Side. The Downer shopping district that stretches south from East Park Place is in the foreground. UW-Milwaukee, with the prominent Sandburg Halls, is pictured in the background.

Northpoint is an affluent residential neighborhood situated along the coast of Lake Michigan with a population of 5,705. Northpoint is in Milwaukee County and is regarded as one of the best places to live in Wisconsin due to the high quality of its housing stock, good parks, high level of safety, clean environment and abundant public services. The North Point Water Tower was constructed in 1873-1874 and is the most prominent physical landmark in the neighborhood. Northpoint is also home to the Villa Terrace Decorative Arts Museum, Columbia St. Mary's Hospital, North Point Lighthouse, Back Bay Park and Bradford Beach.

=== Upper East Side ===
The Upper East Side is an affluent residential neighborhood on the East Side of Milwaukee. The neighborhood is bounded by peaceful green spaces like the Frederick Law Olmsted–designed Riverside Park, with its Urban Ecology Center and public artworks, and Lake Park, with the Newberry Boulevard Historic District linking the two. Residents and students from the nearby main campus of the University of Wisconsin-Milwaukee frequent Indian, Chinese, Greek and Italian eateries on lively Oakland and Downer Avenues. Downer Avenue is also home to the historic Downer Theatre. The Tour of American Dairyland's bike racing circuit hosts an annual bike race known as the Downer Classic. Milwaukee's Riverside University High School is located on the Upper East Side.

=== Downer Woods ===
Downer Woods is a small, laid-back primarily residential neighborhood home to the main campus of the University of Wisconsin-Milwaukee. The area encompasses the Manfred Olson Planetarium, Golda Meir Library and Thomas A. Greene Geological Museum. Also on campus, the Downer Woods Natural Area is an enclosed forested area lined with trails open to public use. Casual, student-friendly restaurants serve quick eats, from pizza to tacos on Oakland Avenue - the primary retail corridor in the neighborhood. The University of Wisconsin-Milwaukee is the primary driver of activity with its large student population, libraries, cinemas and multi-purpose recreational complex, the Klotsche Center. Many of the residential streets in Downer Woods are lined with mature tree canopies and historic homes from a diverse range of architectural styles.

== Parks and recreation ==
The east side is home to renowned parks. Frederick Law Olmsted—famed designer of New York's Central Park—designed both Lake Park and Riverside Park (originally "River Park"), with Newberry Boulevard being the deliberate connector between the two. Lake Park is part of Milwaukee's "Grand Necklace of Parks" and is known for lawn bowling and the North Point lighthouse. In addition, a good share of the Oak Leaf Trail is routed through the neighborhood. Other neighborhood parks include Marshall Park, Bradford Beach, McKinley Park, Prospect Triangle, Downer Woods Natural Area, Caesar's Park, Brady Street Park, Burns Commons and Pulaski Park.

== Transportation ==
Most streets on the East Side of Milwaukee are maintained by the Milwaukee Department of Public Works under the leadership of the Mayor of Milwaukee. Bus service is provided by the Milwaukee County Transit System with 8 lines running through the neighborhood including the heavily used Green and Red lines. Several streets have regular bike lane facilities and the area is served by Milwaukee's Bublr Bike Share network. The University of Wisconsin-Milwaukee operates a private shuttle and bus system for students and faculty.

== Education ==
Milwaukee Public Schools operates area public schools. Grade schools included:

- Hartford University School (K-8)
- Maryland Avenue Montessori School (K-8)
- Cass Street Public School (K-8)
- Lincoln Center of the Arts

Riverside University High School is the area zoned high school. In 2018, the school had a student enrollment of 1,512. Students at Riverside have the opportunity to take Advanced Placement coursework and exams.

Other schools include:

- St. Joan Antida High School
- Tamarack Waldorf School
- Catholic East Elementary School
- All Saints Catholic East School
- The Wisconsin Conservatory of Music
- Wisconsin Institute for Torah Studies
- A Hillel High School

== See also ==
- Neighborhoods of Milwaukee
- University of Wisconsin–Milwaukee
