= Edward Kozłowski =

Polish-American bishop (1860–1915)

The Right Reverend Edward Kozłowski
- Auxiliary Bishop of Milwaukee
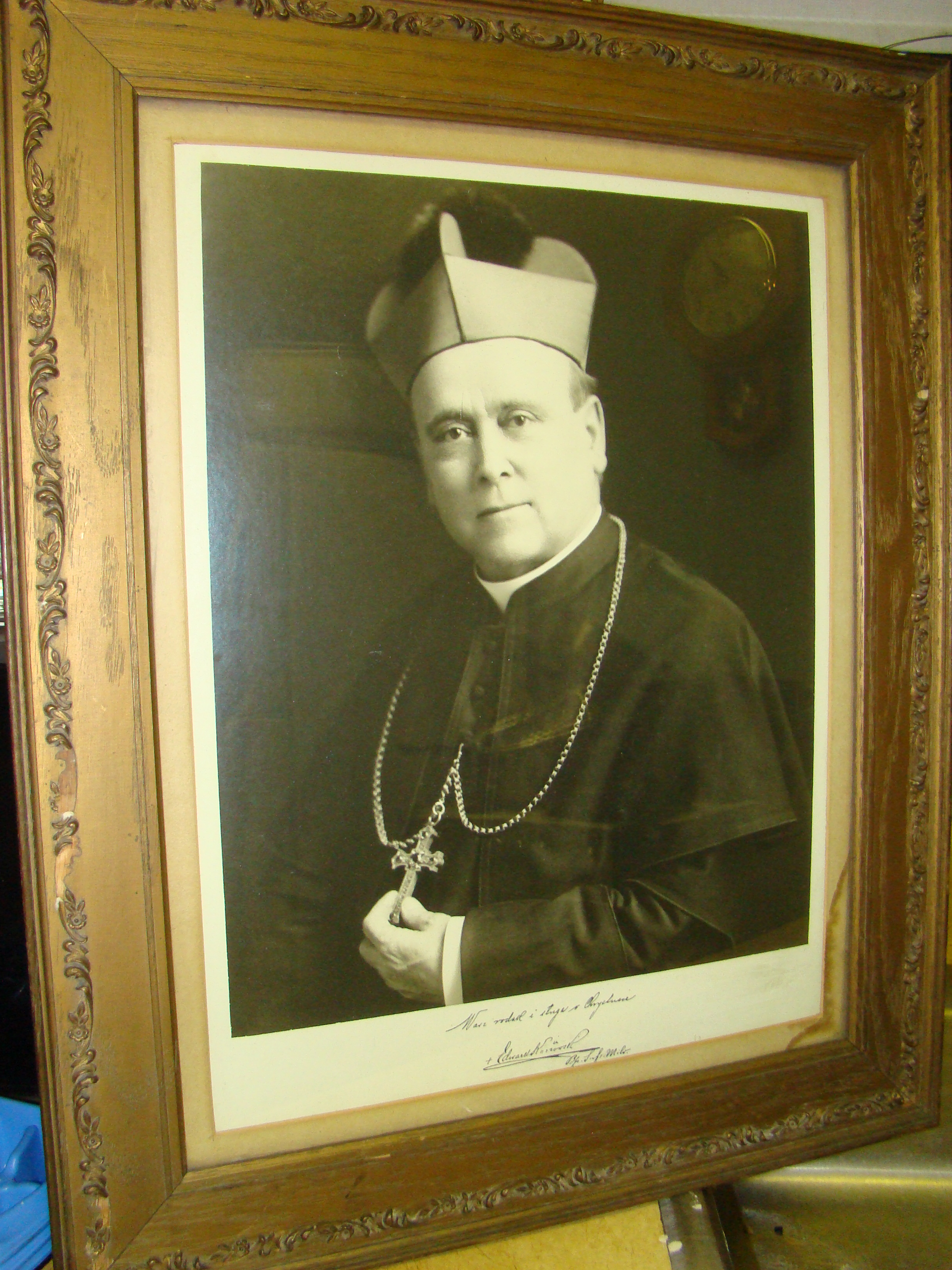
- Bishop Kozlowski
- In office: January 14, 1914 - August 17, 1915

Personal details
- Born: Edward Kozłowski; November 21, 1860 Tarnów, Kingdom of Galicia and Lodomeria, Austrian Empire (now Poland)
- Died: August 7, 1915 (aged 54) Milwaukee, Wisconsin, US
- Denomination: Catholic Church
- Education: St. Francis Seminary

Edward Kozłowski (November 21, 1860 – August 7, 1915) was a Polish-born prelate of the Roman Catholic Church who served as an auxiliary bishop for the Archdiocese of Milwaukee, in Wisconsin from 1914 to 1915. He was the first Polish bishop for Milwaukee.

== Biography ==
=== Early life ===
Edward Kozłowski was born on November 21, 1860, in Tarnów, in what was then the Austrian Empire. He immigrated to the United States in 1885, first settling in Chicago. He then moved to Milwaukee to study for the priesthood at St. Francis Seminary in St. Francis, Wisconsin.

=== Priesthood ===
After pacifying one violent Polish parish in Michigan, Kozłowski was sent to an even more violent one in Manistee. Shots had been fired at the previous priest, and Kozłowski’s calming presence brought peace to a tense situation. Kozłowski showed the gift of not only working with combatant Poles but also maintaining good relations with the local German archbishop, who was often at odds with the parishioners.

Kozłowski was then transferred to Milwaukee and named pastor of St. Stanislaus Parish in an attempt to calm an extremely tense situation there as well. There had been considerable strife between the local Polish parishes and the Archdiocese of Milwaukee, which was run by German and Irish clergy. The local Polish language paper Kuryer Polski of Polish activist and politician Michał Kruszka had been agitating for greater representation within the local church hierarchy. As numerous Poles did not speak English and worked at the bottom of the social economic ladder, many within the archdiocese felt that the Poles were not "American enough" to participate in the church leadership. This situation had eventually led to a split within the church, and a branch of the rival Polish National Catholic Church had been established in Milwaukee. It was thought that Kozłowski's skills as a mediator would find a solution to bring both parties together and heal the wounds.

=== Auxiliary Bishop of Milwaukee ===
On January 14, 1914, amid much celebration, Kozłowski was named as Milwaukee's first Polish bishop by Pope Pius X. He was only the second Polish-speaking Bishop appointed in America, following the appointment of Bishop Paul Peter Rhode in Chicago in 1908. A parade was organized at the Cathedral of St. John the Evangelist, where Kozłowski had been consecrated, and passed along Milwaukee’s streets, which had been lit with torches. A carriage pulled by four horses took Kozłowski to St. Stanislaus, which was filled to capacity. An estimated 50,000 gathered at St. Stanislaus church just to catch a glimpse.

Kozłowski worked tirelessly to heal wounds among the parishioners in Milwaukee as well as to address grievances of Polish priests, who had lower salaries than their German and Irish brethren.

=== Death and legacy ===
But only one year after his appointment, Kozłowski contracted sepsis and died on August 7, 1915. Some 30,000 mourners attended the funeral. Chicago Bishop Paul Rhode declared at the memorial service: "How difficult it was for us to obtain a second Polish bishop, and how easy to lose him".

== See also ==
- Michael Kruszka
- Wacław Kruszka

Catholic Church titles
Preceded by –	Auxiliary Bishop of Milwaukee; 1914–1915	Succeeded by –
