= Haunted State: Theatre of Shadows =

- Directed by: Michael Brown
- Produced by: Michael Brown; Angela Olson
- Starring: Michael Brown; Anne Benson; Todd Dehring
- Production company: Hungry Lion Productions
- Distributed by: Hungry Lion Productions
- Release date: October 25, 2017
- Running time: 101 minutes
- Country: United States
- Language: English

Haunted State: Theatre of Shadows is a 2017 American documentary film executive produced and directed by Michael Brown. It is the second installment of the Haunted State film series. The film's plot focuses on investigations inside Wisconsin theatres that have paranormal claims surrounding it. The film premiered October 25, 2017 at the historic Oriental Theatre in Milwaukee, Wisconsin and it began streaming on Amazon Prime Video on January 2, 2018.

== Film locations ==
- Pabst Brewery, Milwaukee, Wisconsin
- Barrymore Theatre, Madison, Wisconsin
- Riverside Theatre, Milwaukee, Wisconsin
- Oshkosh Grand Opera House, Oshkosh, Wisconsin
- Pabst Theater, Milwaukee, Wisconsin

== Cast ==
(All as themselves)

- Michael Brown
- Anne Benson
- Todd Dehring
- David Williams
- Angela Olson
- Amy Flunker
- Jason Mansmith
- Chelsy Stine
- Sonya Rose
