= Michał Kruszka =

Polish American politician and journalist

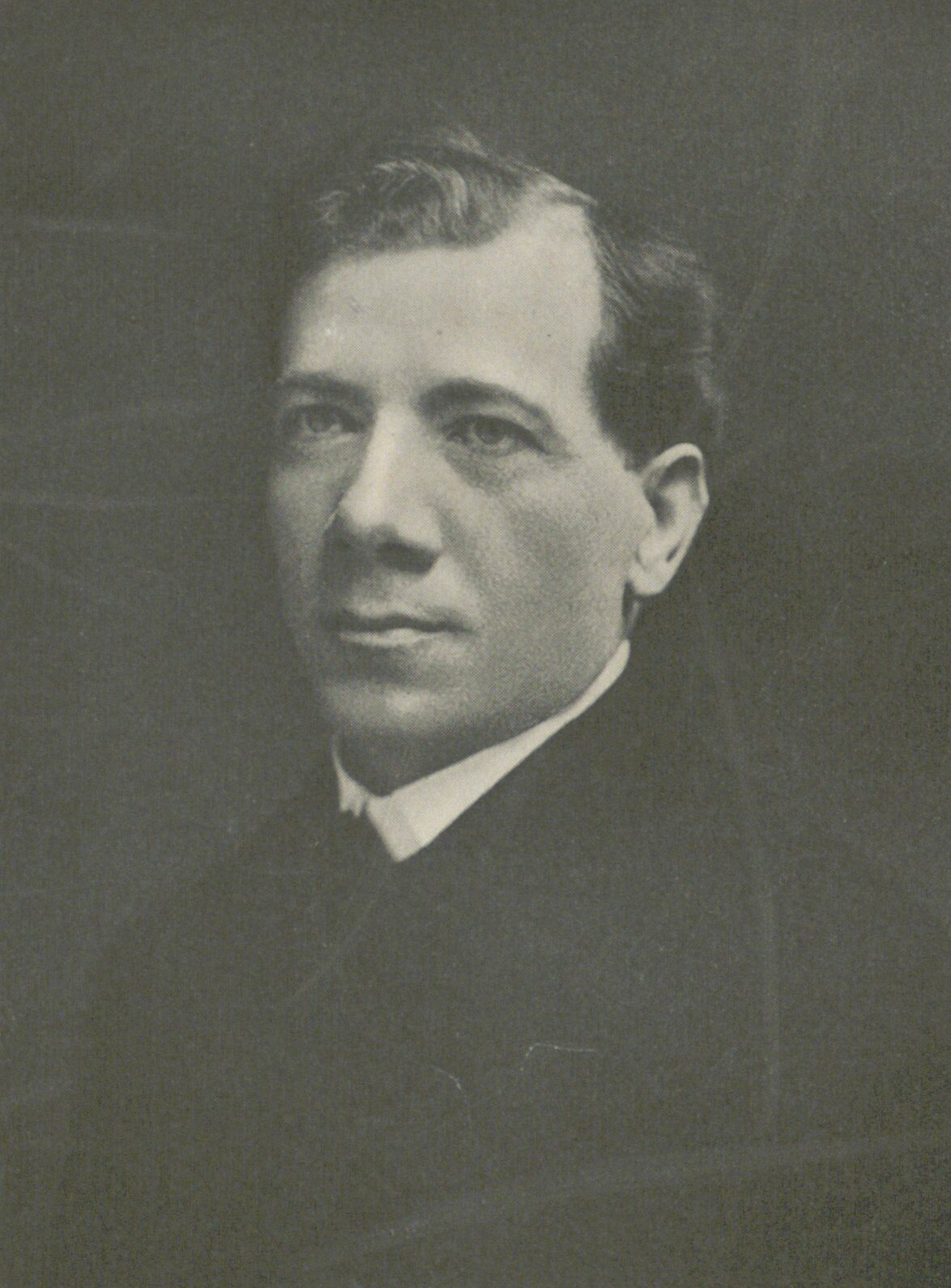

Member of the Wisconsin Senate from the 8th district
- In office January 2, 1893 – January 4, 1897
- Preceded by: James C. Reynolds
- Succeeded by: Julius Edward Roehr

Member of the Wisconsin State Assembly from the Milwaukee 12th district
- In office January 5, 1891 – January 2, 1893
- Preceded by: Edward I. Slupecki
- Succeeded by: Michael F. Blenski

Personal details
- Born: September 28, 1860 Słabomierz, Posen, Prussia
- Died: December 2, 1918 (aged 58) Milwaukee, Wisconsin, U.S.
- Cause of death: Stroke
- Resting place: Fairview Mausoleum (original); Graceland Cemetery (re-interred); Milwaukee, Wisconsin
- Party: Democratic
- Spouse: Jadwiga Kruszka
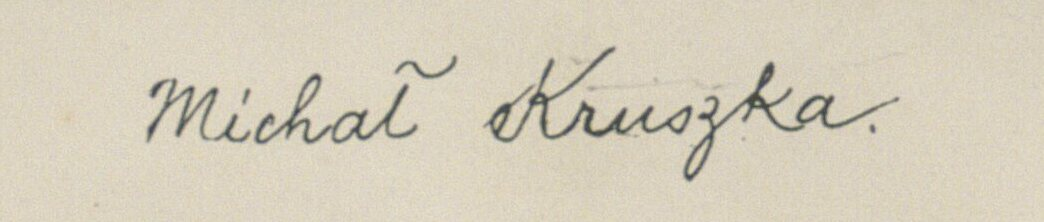
- Signature

Michał Kruszka or Michael Kruszka (September 28, 1860 – December 2, 1918) was a Polish American immigrant, politician, and journalist. He served four years in the Wisconsin State Senate and two years in the State Assembly, representing Milwaukee's south side and southern Milwaukee County. He was the first Polish American member of the Wisconsin Legislature.

== Biography ==
Michał Kruszka was born in 1860 in Słabomierz, in what is now northwest Poland. At the time it was within the Province of Posen in the Kingdom of Prussia. He was educated at the colleges of Filehne and Wągrowiec.

Arrested by the Kaiser's police for pro-Polish agitation and protests against Germanization in his native Poznań at a very early age, Kruszka left Prussia following his release. He arrived in United States in 1880. After arriving in the US, Kruszka learned to speak English and received a business school education at Elizabeth, New Jersey. In 1883, he came to Milwaukee, Wisconsin, as an insurance salesman. But his real passions were politics and journalism and he began attempts to publish a Polish-language newspaper in 1885. After some setbacks, in June 1888, Kruszka founded a successful Polish-language daily called Kuryer Polski. It would be the first successful Polish-language daily in America.

Kruszka entered the realm of politics, eventually winning a seat in the Wisconsin State Assembly in 1890 as a Democrat. Two years later he became the first Polish state senator in the United States having been elected to the Wisconsin State Senate.

In his editorial line, Kruszka demanded respect for Polish Americans by promoting their representation and fair treatment in the churches, politics, fraternal organizations and other facets of society. Devoutly Catholic and nationalistic, Kruszka also took a strong stand on the labor issues of the day. Criticized by some for his strong views, he replied:

"When I sound a delicate piano string, I use a soft little mallet. But when I have to straighten a crooked rail, I use fire and a sledgehammer."

On June 27, 1908, the Kuryer Polski celebrated its 20th anniversary by printing the largest newspaper edition ever made in Milwaukee. It featured 66 pages and a greeting (in Polish and English) thanking their readership of 70,000 Polish people in Milwaukee and 4 million Polish people in America. In 1909, Kruszka expanded his newspaper empire by purchasing Dziennik Narodowy (National Daily News) in Chicago.

Kruszka used this forum to campaign for the appointment of a Polish bishop in the American Catholic Church as well as to call for reforms in the Milwaukee archdiocese. There had been considerable strife between the local Polish parishes and the Archdiocese, which was run by German and Irish clergy. Kruszka continued his passionate agitation for Polish representation in the church hierarchy, which caused considerable conflict with the Milwaukee diocese and criticism from Archbishop Sebastian Gebhard Messmer. The Archbishop of Milwaukee supported the launch of a second Polish language newspaper, Nowiny Polskie, to counter the influence of the Kuryer. Finally on February 12, 1912, the Milwaukee archdiocese took the unprecedented step of declaring that anyone reading the Kuryer or the Dziennik Narodowy would be denied sacramental absolution for their sins.

"Should any such Catholic dare to go to confession and communion without confessing or telling to the priest that they still read or subscribe to the papers mention, let them understand that…they commit horrible sacrilege".

It became a sin to read Kruszka's newspapers. As a result, Kruszka filed suit in the Wisconsin Supreme Court against the archdiocese, but lost. Both sides as well as other parties filed several lawsuits and countersuits against one another for conspiracy and libel. Those religious politics resulted in a schism in the church and consequently three Polish National Catholic Churches were built in Milwaukee and their attendance grew.

In November 1913, Michael Kruszka's passionate crusading led to Father Edward Kozlowski being appointed as the first Polish Bishop for Milwaukee. A jubilant crowd 50,000 gathered at St. Stanislaus church to catch a glimpse of the new bishop and to celebrate the validation of Poles within the leadership of the church.

Kruszka strongly supported the case for a free and independent Poland, and during the First World War he published a weekly column called "Poland's Cause" in Kuryer, agitating for support of the Polish cause. It was partially due to such agitation that some Polish-Americans enlisted in the newly formed Polish army, with the most famous of such units being the Kościuszko Squadron.

Kruszka died on December 2, 1918, after suffering a stroke. Milwaukee mayor Daniel Hoan ordered flags to be flown at half staff until his funeral on December 5. More than 1000 people attended the memorial service which was eulogized by recently elected U.S. congressman John C. Kleczka, the first Polish American to be elected to that post thanks to the Kuryer's support. Without its firebrand editor, the Kuryer would remain out of major church controversies until its closing in 1962.

== Family ==
- parents, Jan and Anna Kluczyńska Kruszka
- half-brother, Wacław Kruszka, a priest, historian, and activist for Polish representation in the episcopate
- wife, Jadwiga Linkiewicz (married in 1882)
- brother, Jozef Kruszka, managing editor of the Kuryer Polski

== See also ==
- Polish National Catholic Church
- Wacław Kruszka
- Kuryer Polski
