= Haunted State =

- Genre: Documentary series Paranormal
- Directed by: Michael Brown
- Country of origin: United States
- Original language: English
- No. of seasons: 1
- No. of episodes: 8

Production
- Executive producer: Michael Brown
- Producers: Michael Brown; Angela Olson
- Production location: Wisconsin
- Cinematography: Angela Olson
- Editors: Michael Brown; Angela Olson
- Running time: 29–66 minutes
- Production company: Hungry Lion Productions

Original release
- Network: Amazon Prime Video
- Release: March 19, 2019 – May 1, 2020

Haunted State is an American documentary television series created by Michael Brown released on Amazon Prime Video. Michael Brown serves as showrunner and is the executive producer along with producer Angela Olson. The series premiered on Amazon Prime Video on March 19, 2019. Set in Wisconsin, the first season focuses on the loss of family members and the ability to communicate with them after they die. Each episode centers on a location in Wisconsin that has paranormal claims and rich history surrounding those claims. A paranormal investigation is conducted and is backed by parapsychologist, Loyd Auerbach. The cast includes four filmmakers, Michael Brown, Angela Olson, Todd Dehring & Anne Benson. The series has become an underground hit for Amazon Prime Video and in May 2020, it was announced that the series would return for a second season.

The series franchise launched with the 2014 film, Haunted State: Whispers From History Past and followed up by the second film, Haunted State: Theatre of Shadows in 2017. The Haunted State title comes from the claim Robert E. Gard (the founder of the Wisconsin Idea Theatre) made that "Wisconsin has the most ghosts per square mile. It is the most Haunted State".

== Episodes ==
=== Season 1 (2019–2020) ===
No. overall	No. in season	Title	Length (minutes)	Directed by	Location(s)	Original release date
1	1	"Island of Secrets"	31:00	Michael Brown	Washington Island, Wisconsin	March 19, 2019
In the series premiere, the film team heads to Nelsen's Hall Bitters Pub on Washington Island off the northeast tip of Door Peninsula in Door County, Wisconsin where the bar dates back to 1899 and is experiencing decades of paranormal activity from one of the former owners.
2	2	"Death's Door"	30:00	Michael Brown	Washington Island, Wisconsin	April 23, 2019
Still on Washington Island, the team takes a side-track investigation at the Historic Island dairy, now a Lavender Farm and heads back to finish the investigation at Nelsen's Hall.
3	3	"Keepers of Light"	29:00	Michael Brown	Baileys Harbor, Wisconsin	May 17, 2019
Traveling back to the mainland, the film team heads to Cana Island Lighthouse, which dates back to 1869. While the team is there, Angela and the team hear what they think is her recently deceased father's voice, which leads the team to share their losses with each other. As Angela begins to sell her childhood home, Angela mentions a code word she gave to her father before he died. Her father, a big believer in the paranormal, promised he would say this code word after his death. Angela being a skeptic of the paranormal won't believe in the paranormal unless she hears this secret word.
4	4	"Spirits"	32:00	Michael Brown	Carlsville, Wisconsin	June 6, 2019
The film team visits a former school house that dates back to 1868, that is now called Door Peninsula Winery & Door County Distillery. They experience more vocal evidence from Angela's family, this time from her deceased mother, along with paranormal activity related to the property.
5	5	"Embers"	32:00	Michael Brown	Egg Harbor, Wisconsin	August 1, 2019
One year ago to the day of a massive fire that sent the Shipwrecked Brew Pub up in flames, the team investigates. There are rumors of tunnels related to Al Capone on the property.
6	6	"Lifeboat"	31:00	Michael Brown	Sturgeon Bay, Wisconsin	September 26, 2019
Angela, Anne & Michael film at the Door County Maritime Museum. Michael pays tribute to both of his grandfathers when he sees a World War II exhibit. Anne & Angela experience some angry spirits upon a 149-foot tugboat called the John Purves.
7	7	"A Guiding Light"	31:00	Michael Brown	Appleton, Wisconsin & Green Bay, Wisconsin	March 24, 2020
In a two location episode, the film team heads to Deja vu Martini Lounge in Appleton, Wisconsin, a location that used to be a former bank built in 1911 where today the old vaults have paranormal activity claims surrounding them. Then the team heads to Captain's Walk Winery in Green Bay, Wisconsin, the former home of a prominent Green Bay area family from the 1860's, where one member of that family, Helen, may be behind the unexplained electrical anomalies inside the building.
8	8	"Private Investigator"	66:00	Michael Brown	Green Bay, Wisconsin	May 1, 2020
In the season finale, the film team films at the National Railroad Museum in Green Bay, Wisconsin. There are claims of shadow people being spotted by the staff. Angela comes to grips with leaving her childhood house once and for all. She conducts one last investigation into her home, trying to hear the code word her father and her agreed upon before his sudden death.

=== Distribution ===
- United States on Amazon Prime Video

=== International ===
Haunted State is currently on air at the following countries and channels:

- Australia on Amazon Prime Video
- Bahamas on Amazon Prime Video
- British Indian Ocean Territory on Amazon Prime Video
- British Virgin Islands on Amazon Prime Video
- Canada on Amazon Prime Video
- Fiji on Amazon Prime Video
- Ghana on Amazon Prime Video
- Ireland on Amazon Prime Video
- Jamaica on Amazon Prime Video
- Kenya on Amazon Prime Video
- Liberia on Amazon Prime Video
- New Zealand on Amazon Prime Video
- Nigeria on Amazon Prime Video
- Philippines on Amazon Prime Video
- South Africa on Amazon Prime Video
- Tonga on Amazon Prime Video
- Trinidad and Tobago on Amazon Prime Video
- Uganda on Amazon Prime Video
- United Kingdom on Amazon Prime Video
