= East Brady Street Historic District =

Historic district in Wisconsin, United States

- U.S. National Register of Historic Places
- U.S. Historic district
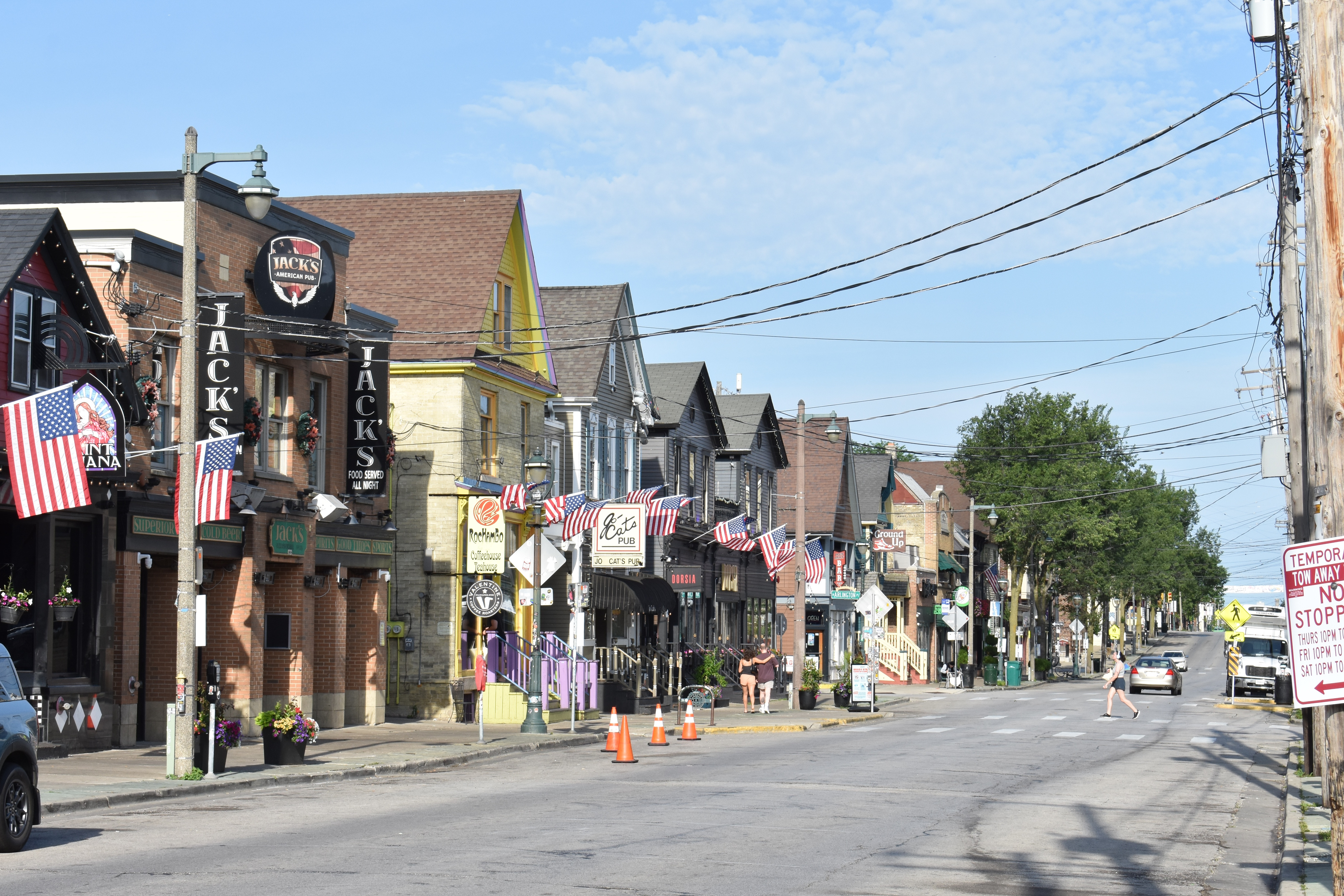
- East Brady Street Historic District
- Location: Milwaukee, Wisconsin
- NRHP reference No.: 90000363
- Added to NRHP: March 9, 1990

The East Brady Street Historic District is located in Milwaukee, Wisconsin. It was added to the National Register of Historic Places in 1990.

== History ==
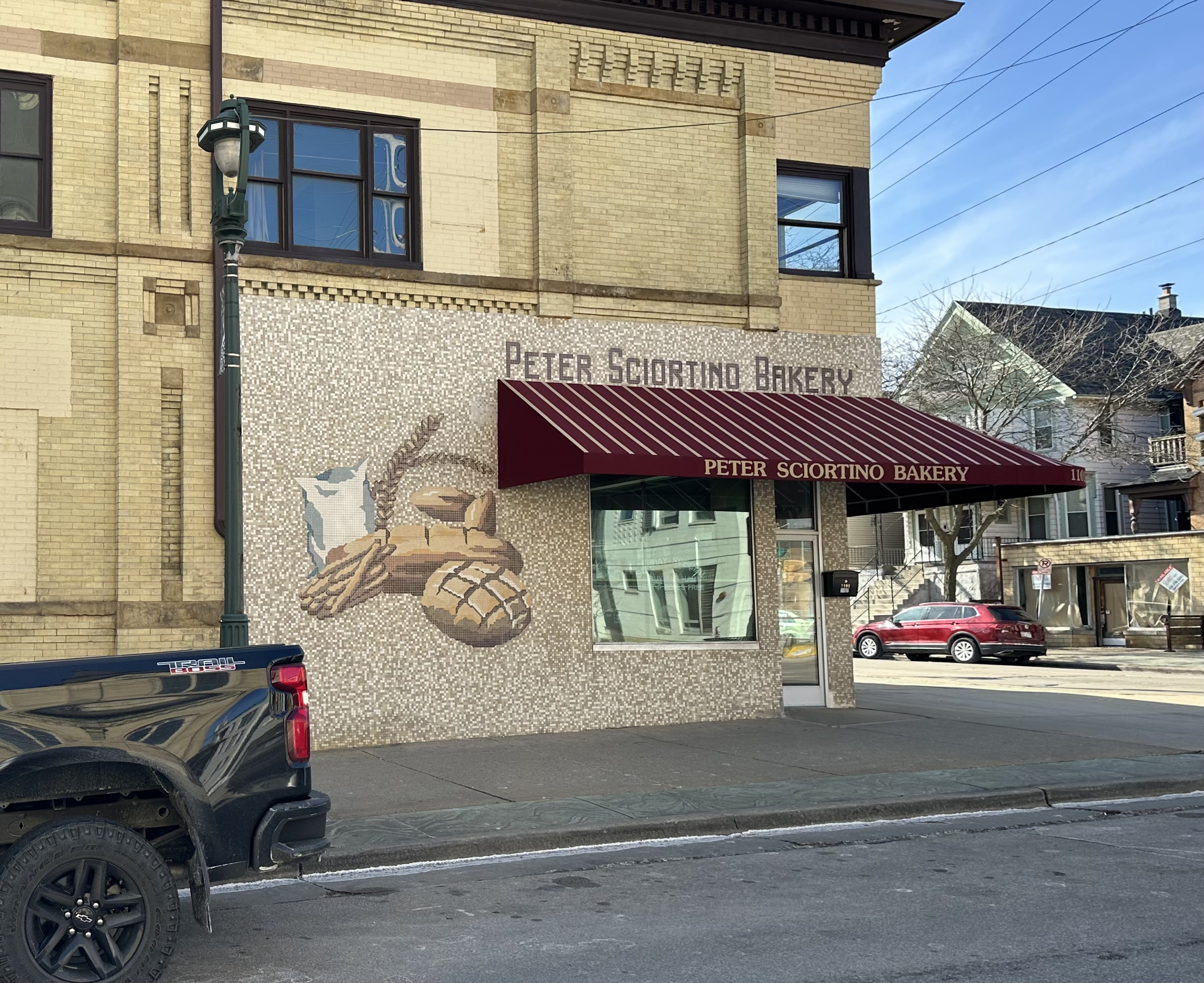
Peter Sciortino Bakery Brady Street and Humboldt

In the 1870s, the district emerged as an enclave of Polish working-class immigrants living in the surrounding neighborhood. Starting in the 1930s it also attracted many Italian immigrants and eventually became known as Little Italy. St. Hedwig's, built in 1886, is located at the center of the district. A longtime Italian grocery and Italian bakery are still mainstays of the neighborhood.

The western end of Brady Street leads to the 2004 Brady Street Bus Shelter, 2006 Marsupial Bridge and Media Garden, and 2012 Trestle Deck—infrastructure and public space projects designed by LA DALLMAN, the architecture practice of Grace La and James Dallman. The urban transformation was honored with the Rudy Bruner Award Silver Medal and numerous other design awards including the American Institute of Architects Honor Award.

Here is a sample of historic buildings in the district, roughly in the order built:

- The house at 826 East Brady Street is a simple worker's cottage, probably built in the 1870s, and typical for that period.
- The Sikorsky Saloon at 1200-1204 E. Brady Street is a 2-story cream brick building with Italianate-styled hood moulds over the windows, built about 1875. It had three storefronts at street level and living quarters above.
- The Joseph Polczynski Tavern at 1701-1703 N. Arlington is a 2.5-story cream brick building with simple Italianate styling. It was a wooden building when it was moved in 1872 to N. Franklin and East Brady, where it served as St. Hedwig's School. In 1879 St. Hedwig's had outgrown it and it was raffled off and moved to the current location, where Joe Polczynski encased it in a veneer of cream brick and ran a saloon there.
- The J. Kunitzky Block at 1673-77 N Farwell Avenue is a 3-story cream brick business block - an early major commercial building. It was designed by H.C. Koch in High Victorian Italianate style with brick hood moulds over the windows and a cornice of wood and sheet metal. Originally John Kunitzky ran a saloon on the first floor, and lived on the second. The third floor held a meeting hall.
- The John Sonnenberg duplex at 1235-37 E. Brady Street is a 2.5-story duplex built in 1881. The massing, fish-scaled shingles in the gable ends, and the fretwork above the porches are all Queen Anne touches. Sonnenberg was a grocer.
- The McLaughlin building at 1687-89 North Franklin Place is a 2.5-story brick saloon built in 1883 for John P. McLaughlin. It lays a small Queen Anne-style gable end (complete with shingles) over a boomtown facade in an unusual way. Theodore Wnuk ran the saloon from 1884 for many years.
- The 2.5-story block at 1214-16 East Brady Street was built in the mid-1880s, a brick building with hood moulds and a cornice from Italianate style and wood shingles in the gable end peeking out above the cornice - thoroughly Queen Anne.
- St Hedwig's Roman Catholic Church at 1704 N Humboldt Avenue towers above the district with its 162-foot tower. It was designed by Henry Messmer in Romanesque Revival style and built in 1886.
- The Joseph Polcznski building at 1316 E. Brady Street is a 2-story brick High Victorian Italianate-style store built in 1886 with its display windows framed in brick pilasters and cast iron piers and the top capped with a sheet metal cornice.
- The 3-story block at 1115-17 E. Brady Street was built in the late 1880s and its street-level storefront is still mostly original. The architect Ignatz Trzebiaboroski mixed the asymmetry and varied surfaces of Queen Anne style with the pilasters, dentils and cornice of Classical Revival style.
- Schlitz Hall at 1208-12 E. Brady St. is a 2.5-story frame building with two storefronts at street-level, two bay windows on the second floor, and a recessed window with Queen Anne multi-pane glass in the gable end. The second floor originally held a meeting hall, but that has been remodeled into apartments.
- The Trzebiatowski Building at 1692 N Humboldt Avenue is a large 2.5-story brick Queen Anne-style block with interesting dormers. It was designed by a man named Schutz and built for dry goods merchant Felix Trzebiatowski in 1888.
- St. Hedwig's School at 1730 N Franklin Place is a 3-story brick school with 4-story tower designed by Henry Messmer in High Victorian Gothic style and built in 1889. A flat-roofed addition was added to it in 1919.
- The flat-roofed building at 1401-03 E. Brady Street, built about 1890, had a storefront at street-level and a storekeeper's flat above. The flat features some shallow oriel windows and the top of the building is trimmed with a simple cornice. Other than the boarded-over display windows, the building survives much as when it was built.
- The house at 1021-23 E. Brady St. is a 2-story Stick style home built in 1890. The storefront below was added around 1921, and has been used by several plumbing contractors.
- The Pabst Brewing Company Saloon at 1006 East Brady St is a 2-story brick Romanesque Revival saloon built in 1890 on a street corner.
- The Charles Ross Hardware Store at 1234-38 E. Brady Street is a 3-story building designed by Wiskocil and Schutz and built in 1897, with a largely intact street-level storefront. Above that, two oriels span the second and third stories. The cornice is topped with metal balusters.
- The Schlitz Brewing Company Tavern at 1699 North Astor Street is a 2-story red brick Romanesque Revival building on a corner, designed by Kirchhoff and Rose and built in 1903. It has round arches at street level and a sheet metal cornice across the top of the walls.
- The Mrs. Lillian Young duplex at 1696-98 N Marshall Street is an unusual combination, with its German Renaissance Revival parapeted gable end and its bell-roofed corner tower. It was designed by Wolff & Evans and built in 1906.
- The Hambach & Hellmann Meat Store at 1024 E. Brady Street is a 2.5-story store with upstairs apartment designed by Theodore Schultz with the symmetric parapet of German Renaissance Revival style and built in 1910. It has since been bought by and incorporated into the Glorioso store next door.
- The Suminski Funeral Home at 1218-20 E Brady Street is a 2.5-story brick and limestone designed in Arts and Crafts style by Hugo Miller and built in 1916.
- The Toran-Sinagra house at 827-829 E Brady Street consists of a 2.5-story Craftsman-style house built in 1916 by P.J. Toran to which in 1931 Cono Sigagro fused a 2-story brick grocery store in 20th Century Commercial-style.
- The Glorioso building at 1016-1020 E. Brady St is a 2-story Mediterranean Revival-styled commercial building with shaped parapets, designed by Milwaukee architect George Zagel and built in 1927.
- The Lerner Brothers' Fruit Market at 1229-31 E. Brady Street was built in 1929 and is little changed from then, a Mediterranean Revival-styled brick building with a plate glass storefront and recessed entry, with an apartment above, topped by a parapet trimmed in limestone. The building was designed by T. Topzant.
- The Boleslaw Jazdewski building at 1203-1205 E. Brady Street was built in 1931, a brick building with two large gables trimmed with shaped parapets, loosely suggesting Mission Revival style. The Peoples Building and Loan Association originally occupied the west half and the Great Atlantic and Pacific Tea Company occupied the east. The street-level storefronts have since been remodeled.
