= Michael Brown (film director) =

American director and filmmaker (born 1978)

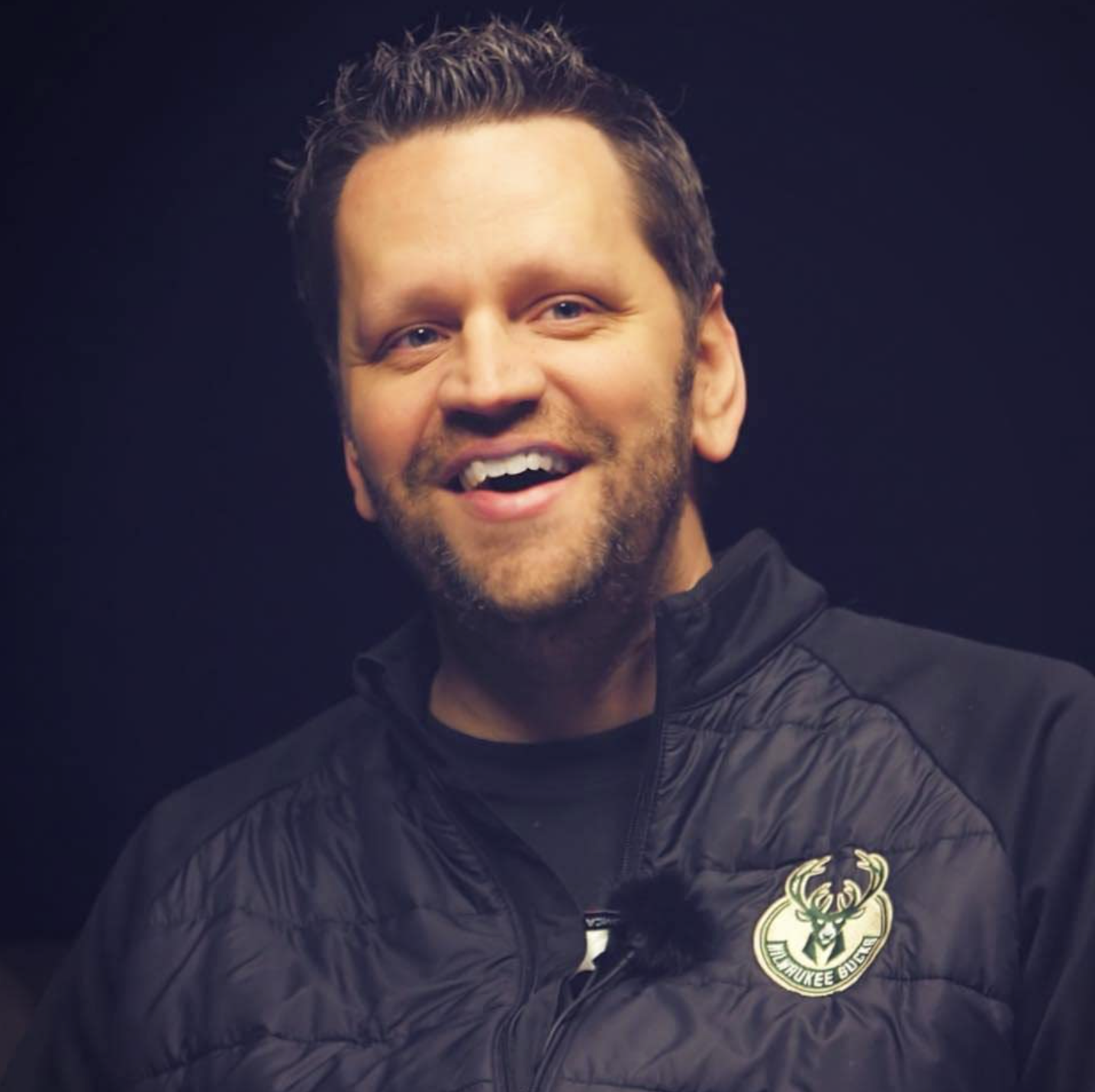
- Brown during filming of Haunted State (2020)
- Born: Michael Anthony Brown; August 4, 1978 (age 48); Milwaukee, Wisconsin, U.S.
- Education: University of Wisconsin-Milwaukee
- Occupations: Television producer, Showrunner, Film director
- Years active: 2012–present
- Known for: Haunted State & Roller Life
- Website: michaelbrownfilm.com

Michael Anthony Brown (born August 4, 1978) is an American television producer, documentary filmmaker, and progressive political activist. He is the director of Haunted State a documentary series on Amazon Amazon Prime Video and the documentary films Roller Life (2016), Haunted State: Whispers From History Past (2014) and Haunted State: Theatre of Shadows (2017).

== Early life ==
Brown attended Brookfield Central High School in Brookfield, Wisconsin (class of 1996). He went on to attend the University of Wisconsin-Milwaukee's film program, but quickly dropped out due to financial reasons. After leaving college, he worked at WKTI, his favorite childhood radio station, at times filling in to produce the Reitman and Mueller morning show.

== TV shows ==
Haunted State, is an eight-part documentary series that premiered on Amazon Prime Video on March 19, 2019. Brown is the director, executive producer, show runner and star of the show. Set in Wisconsin, the first season focuses on the loss of family members and the ability to communicate with them after they die. Each episode centers on a location in Wisconsin that has paranormal claims and rich history surrounding those claims.

== Films ==
Brown's first film was Haunted State: Whispers From History Past, a 2014 documentary about four locations in Wisconsin with popular paranormal claims. Although Brown never believed in ghosts, after the events that took place in the film, he changed his mind.

Released in 2016, Roller Life explored the challenges female athletes face playing flat track roller derby. The film featured the Milwaukee, Wisconsin-based Brewcity Bruisers flat track roller derby league. Roller Life (2016) was a selection at the 2017 Milwaukee Film Festival.

Brown added to the Haunted State documentary series with Haunted State: Theatre Of Shadows in October 2017. The film featured four theatres in Wisconsin and explored the paranormal claims of each.

== Political activism ==
Brown founded United Wisconsin PAC and is a former member of its board of directors. United Wisconsin was the non-partisan political action committee that forced the recall election of Wisconsin Governor Scott Walker in 2011.
