= Black Cat Alley =

Art display alleyway in Milwaukee, WI

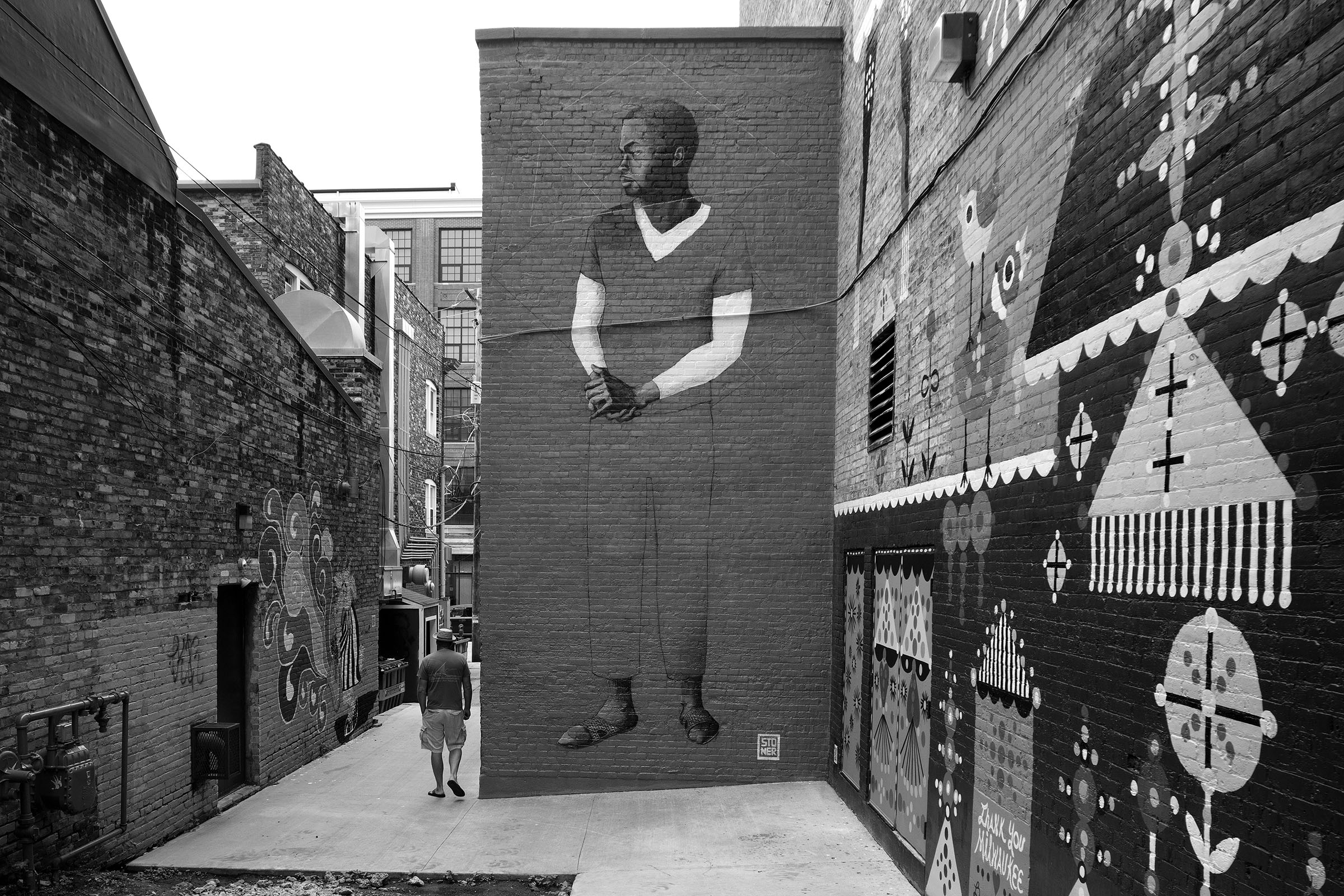
Black Cat Alley

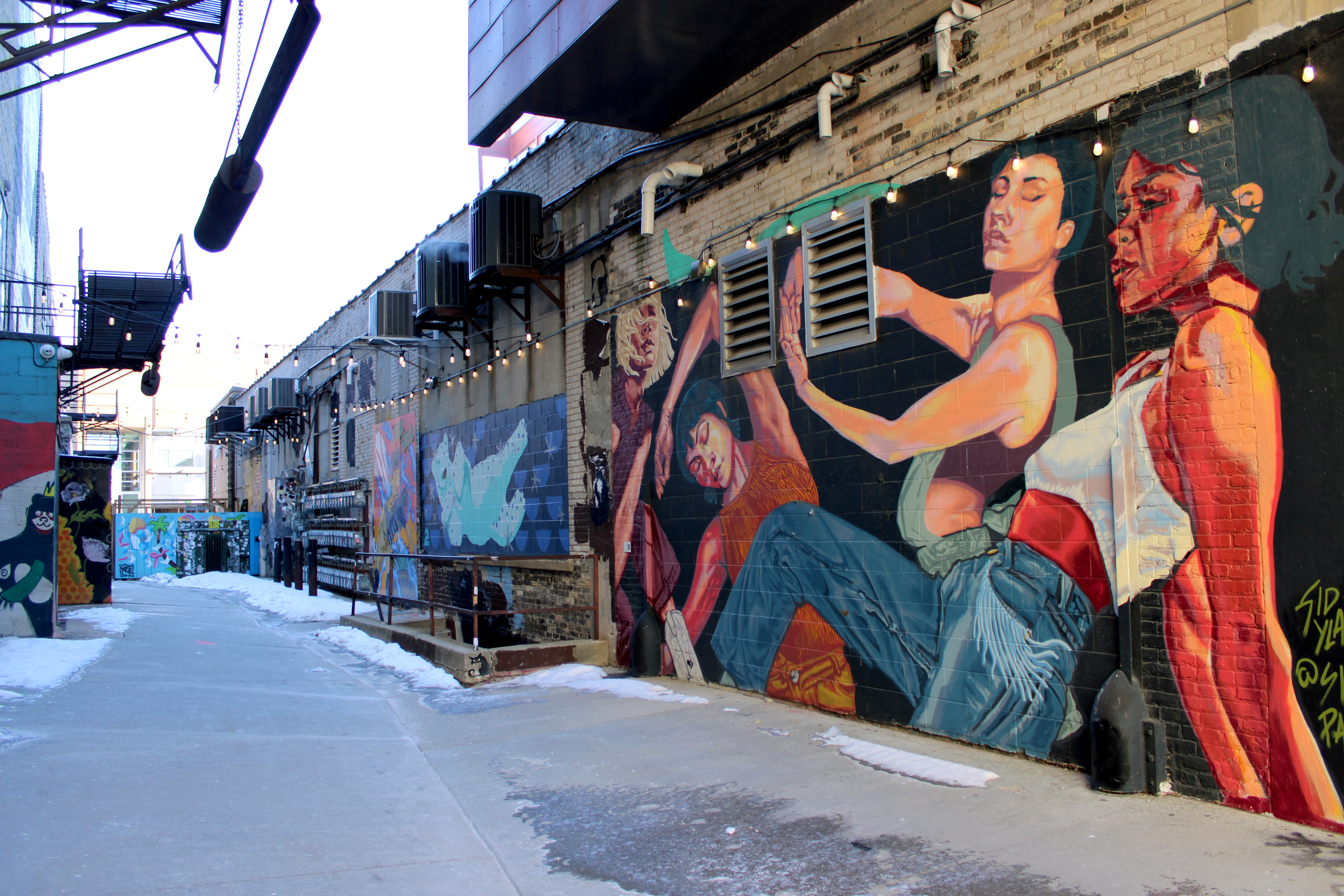
Black Cat Alley in Feb. 2026

Black Cat Alley is an arts destination in a one-block alleyway in Milwaukee, Wisconsin known for its street art mural installations. It is located behind the historic Oriental Theatre (Milwaukee) and includes both temporary and semi-permanent installations by a variety of artists and art groups. Each year, as many as 20,000 visitors pass through the alley.

== About ==
The East Side BID, owner of the Black Cat Alley, holds special events periodically in Black Cat Alley such as "Black Cat After Dark," as well as other activations such as yoga classes, mural tours, "AlleyWayz" (a concert series in partnership with WYMS 88.9 Radio Milwaukee), vendor markets, and more.

Artists whose works have been included in the alley include MTO, Koctel, Daisy Gertel, Tia Richardson, Brandon Minga, David Najib Kasir, Bunnie Reiss, Janson Rapisarda ("CERA"), Jeremy Novy, Thomas "Detour" Evans and Bigshot Robot.

== History ==
Although the alley had been a local spot for graffiti writers in Milwaukee for many decades, Black Cat Alley was officially launched in 2016 when local artists Stacey Williams-Ng and Tim Decker successfully proposed the concept to private property owners, including Milwaukee developer New Land Enterprises, and neighborhood groups.

Black Cat Alley is located on Milwaukee's East Side in what was previously an unused, privately owned alleyway. The alley, located behind the Oriental Theatre (Milwaukee) and other commercial destinations, had a reputation for crime and other unsavory activity for over 40 years. From 2014 to 2016, Stacey Williams-Ng and Tim Decker worked with the East Side BID and the various property owners to create a plan for what is now known as Black Cat Alley, a place that has since become one of Milwaukee's top ten tourist destinations, according to data provided by Visit Mke.
