= Henry Messmer =

Swiss-American architect (1839–1899)

- Born: 25 August 1839; Switzerland
- Died: 20 February 1899 (aged 59); Milwaukee, Wisconsin
- Occupation: Architect

Henry Messmer (August 25, 1839 – February 20, 1899) was a Swiss-American architect who practiced in Milwaukee, Wisconsin, from 1866 until his death. He was a prolific designer of institutional buildings as well as homes on Milwaukee's near north and east sides.

== Career ==
Born in Switzerland, Messmer studied architecture at Heidelberg University and apprenticed in Europe before coming to Wisconsin in 1866. He worked as a draftsman in the offices of Leonard Schmidtner in Milwaukee and Col. Stephen Vaughn Shipman in Madison before establishing his own architectural firm in Milwaukee in 1873.

Messmer designed hundreds of brewery buildings, warehouses, and commercial buildings as well as middle-class homes over the next two decades as well as a number of churches and schools. Prominent works include the churches of St. Hedwig's (1886), St. Hyacinth (1882–83), and Saints Peter and Paul (1890) in Milwaukee, St. Mary's in Port Washington (1881), and the rectory of St. Casimir's in Milwaukee. His cousin Sebastian Messmer was a Milwaukee archbishop.

Robert A. Messmer joined his father's firm shortly after graduating from East Division High School in 1887, and the firm was renamed H. Messmer & Son. After Henry Messmer's death in 1899, the firm kept this name. Robert A. Messmer was later joined by his younger brother, Henry J. Messmer, and the family firm continued under the name R. A. Messmer & Brother until about 1910.
