= Downer Theatre =

Historic movie theater in Milwaukee, Wisconsin, USA

Coordinates: 43.059657°N 87.885664°W

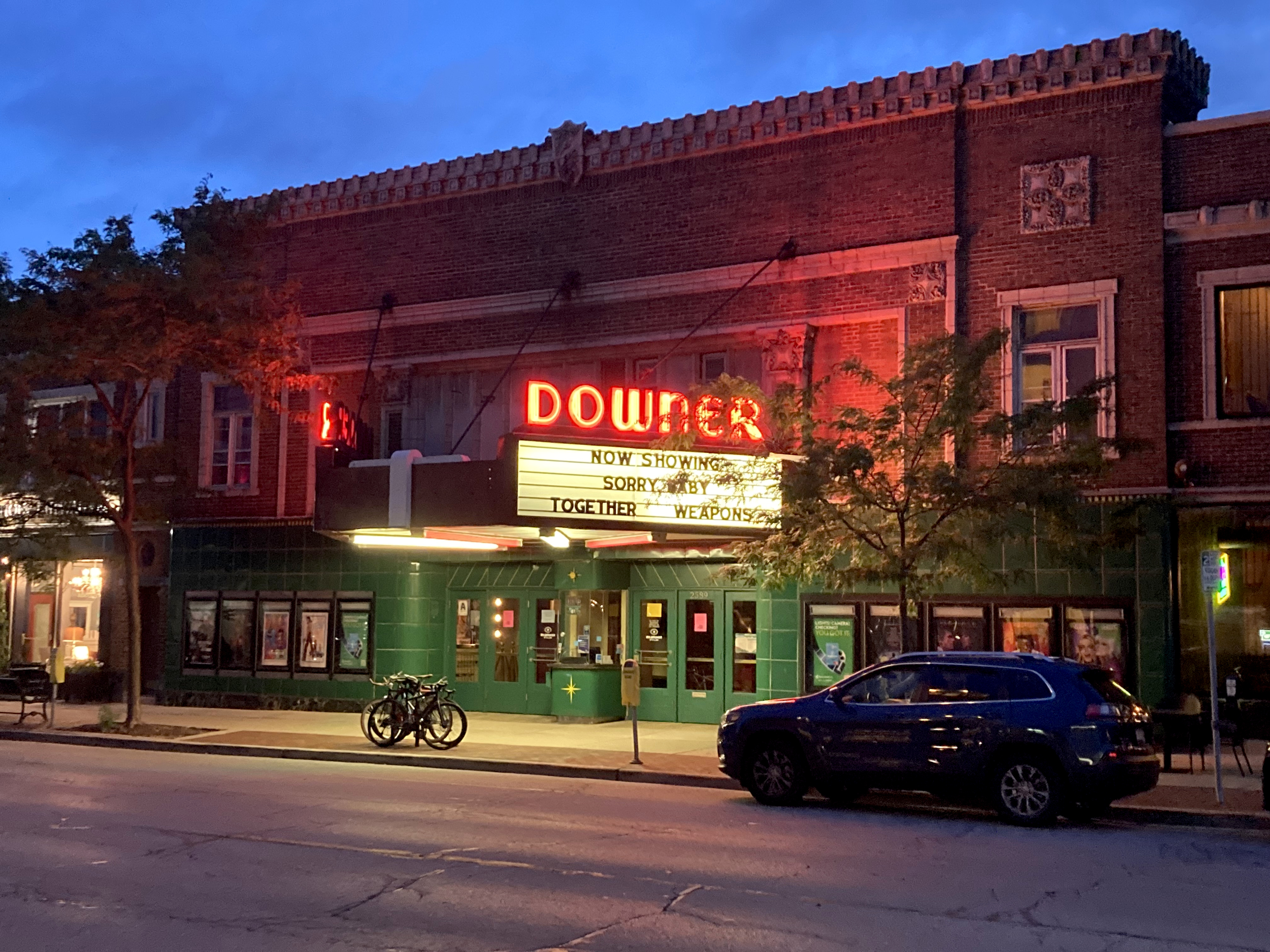
- Downer Theatre in August 2025
- Interactive map of Downer Theatre
- Address: 2589 North Downer Avenue; Milwaukee; United States
- Operator: Milwaukee Film
- Capacity: 440

Construction
- Opened: 1915
- Closed: 2023
- Reopened: 2024
- Architect: Martin S. Tullgren

Website
- mkefilm.org/oriental-theatre/about/about-downer-theatre

The Downer Theatre is a historic cinema in Milwaukee, Wisconsin, United States, formerly operated by Landmark Theatres. Opened in 1915, it was the oldest continually operating cinema in the city of Milwaukee. It is located in the Upper East Side neighborhood of the East Side of Milwaukee. The cinema became part of the Landmark Theatre chain in 1990, and was renovated and converted to a twin-screen venue. The theatre closed in September 2023. In March of 2024, the reopening of the theatre was announced after being purchased by Milwaukee Film.

== History ==
The Downer Theatre was opened in 1915 as part of a mixed-use complex located on Downer Avenue in the Upper East Side neighborhood of Milwaukee developed by Oscar and Marc Brachman and movie entrepreneurs Thomas and John Saxe for a price of $65,000.

The Downer opened during a time of rapid development in the area. The cinema was one of several dozen operating in the city of Milwaukee during the heyday of the film industry. It was remodeled in 1937 in a Streamline Moderne style. The current marquee and green enamel plate exterior replaced the historic brick façade during the 1930s-era renovation. In the 1940s, as consumption patterns and neighborhood demographics began to change, the Downer began to transition into a niche role as Milwaukee’s independent and art cinema under the leadership of longtime manager Estelle Steinbach.

The cinema was renovated and subdivided into a two-screen operation in 1990. The theatre closed its doors in September 2023.

In March 2024, Milwaukee Film announced that they would be reopening the Downer Theatre. It officially reopened on April 12th, as part of the 16th Milwaukee Film Festival.

== Design ==
The cinema was designed by Martin S. Tullgren and cost $65,000 to construct. Its bright green and red neon marquee is a local Milwaukee landmark. The two screens have collective capacity for 440 patrons. The cinema has a small snack bar that serves candy, popcorn and both alcoholic and non-alcoholic drinks. The cinema is located inside a mixed-use two-story red brick structure located in the Downer Avenue Business Improvement District. Other tenants of the building include residential apartments, a bar, bookstore and pizzeria.

== See also ==
- Oriental Theatre (Milwaukee), another theater operated by Milwaukee Film
- Milwaukee Film Festival, a film festival hosted inside the Downer Theatre
