= United Wisconsin =

American political action committee

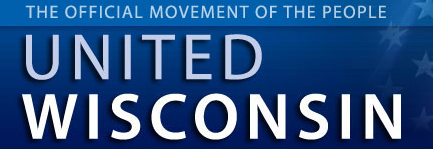
- Abbreviation: UW
- Formation: 2011
- Purpose: Political action committee
- Headquarters: Madison, Wisconsin
- Founder: Michael Brown
- Staff: 4
- Volunteers: 35,000

United Wisconsin PAC is an independent political action committee, grassroots organization of citizens restoring the Wisconsin tradition of democracy in action. United Wisconsin was a leading group in the effort to recall the Governor of Wisconsin Scott Walker on June 5, 2012.

== Founding ==
On February 11, 2011, Governor Walker unveils the budget repair bill, which includes plans to strip collective bargaining rights for most state employees and cuts in state aid to education. Days later, United Wisconsin was founded by Michael Brown, a 33-year-old single father and filmmaker from Appleton. Michael Brown was an Independent candidate for Wisconsin's 57th Assembly District against an incumbent Democrat in 2010. Walker unveils the budget repair bill, which includes plans to strip collective bargaining rights for most state employees and cuts in state aid to education.

On March 4, 2011, Michael Brown registered United Wisconsin as a political action committee in the state of Wisconsin and created a website where people can sign a pledge to recall Walker. On March 29, United Wisconsin picked six Board of Directors; Michael Brown, Lynn Freeman, Ryan Lawler, Kevin Straka, Ray Yunker and Kathryn Johnson.

== Recall of Scott Walker ==
On October 3, 2011, United Wisconsin Board of Directors talked for more than two hours before picking November 15 as the day to launch the recall petition drive against Walker. They cited the changing political climate, including the John Doe investigation and Gilkes' job change, as reasons for their decision.

On November 15, 2011, Julie Wells of Fort Atkinson filed on behalf of United Wisconsin to launch the recall petition drive against Walker.

On January 17, 2012, UW said that one million signatures were collected, which far exceeded the 540,208 needed, and amounts to 23 percent of the state's eligible voters, 46 percent of the total votes cast in the 2010 gubernatorial election, and just shy of the 1.1 million votes earned by Walker. On March 29, the Wisconsin Government Accountability Board released its final signature counts for the Walker recall petition. The GAB reported that 931,053 signatures were originally turned in. Of that number, 26,114 were struck by GAB staff for various reasons and an additional 4,001 duplicates were struck. The final total certified by the GAB was 900,938 signatures.

== See also ==
- Democratic Party of Wisconsin
- Wisconsin gubernatorial recall election
