= St. Adalbert's Church (Milwaukee) =

Catholic parish church in Wisconsin, US

St. Adalbert Church
- Location within Wisconsin
- 43°00′21.92″N 87°56′16.22″W
- Location: 1923 W. Becher St. Milwaukee, Wisconsin
- Country: US
- Denomination: Roman Catholic
- Website: www.stadalbertmke.org

History
- Status: Parish church
- Founded: 1908

Architecture
- Functional status: Active
- Architect: Francis Gurda
- Style: Polish-inspired Romanesque revival
- Completed: 1909

Administration
- Archdiocese: Milwaukee
- Parish: St. Adalbert

Clergy
- Pastor: Fr. Ricardo Martín

St. Adalbert's Church, referred to in Polish as 'Kościół Świętego Wojciecha', is a Roman Catholic parish located at 1923 West Becher Street on Milwaukee's South Side, and one of Milwaukee's Polish Cathedrals.

== Dedication ==
The church is dedicated to Adalbert of Prague, a Slavic martyr and saint of the Roman Catholic Church.

== History ==
With the need for additional churches exploding on Milwaukee's South Side, five lots were purchased on the corner of Becher and South 19th Street on June 23, 1908. Two months later the cornerstone was laid and blessed under the guidance of Rev. Michael Domachowski, who was also named as the first parish priest.

On February 28, 1909, the church and its adjoining school were blessed and completed later that year. The students were taught by the School Sisters of Notre Dame. On September 18, 1909, Domachowski was followed by another priest, Wacław (Wenceslaus) Kruszka, fresh from his extensive "exile" in Ripon. He was elated to finally have a Milwaukee parish, which had been brokered by the Polish bishop in Chicago, Auxiliary Bishop Paul Peter Rhode.

The worship space in the school building served for more than two decades, until the completion of the present church in the spring of 1931.

Father Kruszka brought love and passion to his parish. The adjoining school reached its peak enrollment by 1924, when 1,585 pupils were taught by 23 sisters. Due to growing attendance and the popularity of the pastor, the parish decided to build a new church at a cost of $252,000 on land donated by St. Hyacinth's parish. On April 23, 1931, the church was completed and blessed.

During that time, Father Kruszka was also instrumental in organizing the new Blessed Sacrament Parish on 41st and Oklahoma Streets.

== Architecture ==
The church is the city's only example of Polish-inspired Romanesque Revival architecture. The tall tower on the northwest corner of the church was built to resemble that of Wawel Cathedral in Kraków, Poland. The copper-clad belfry holds four bells with the names of St. Adalbert, Jesus, Mary, and the Angel inscribed on them. The church became well known in the Milwaukee area for its beautiful stained glass windows.

== See also ==
- Wacław Kruszka
- Alan Kulwicki (buried in the church's cemetery)

== Sources ==
- Borun, Thaddeus, We, the Milwaukee Poles (Milwaukee: Nowiny Publishing Co. 1946)
