= Saints Peter and Paul Roman Catholic Church Complex =

Historic church in Wisconsin, United States

- U.S. National Register of Historic Places
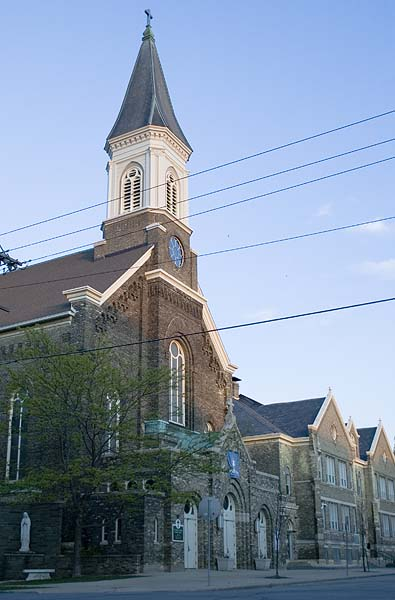
- Saints Peter and Paul Roman Catholic Church Complex
- Location: 2474 and 2490 N. Cramer St. 2479 and 2491 N. Murray Ave. Milwaukee, Wisconsin
- Built: 1889
- Architect: Henry Messmer
- Architectural style: Romanesque/Classical Revival
- NRHP reference No.: 91001392
- Added to NRHP: September 13, 1991

Saints Peter and Paul Roman Catholic Church Complex is located in Milwaukee, Wisconsin. The complex was added to the National Register of Historic Places in 1991 for its architectural significance.

Saints Peter and Paul parish was created in 1889, a response to the upper east side's rapidly growing German immigrant population during the 1880s and 90s, at the direction of Milwaukee's vicar general, the Right Reverend Leonard Batz. The parish began with forty-three families, and they initially worshiped in a temporary chapel on the corner of East Bradford and North Cramer Streets, while the permanent church was being built nearby.

The church building was designed by Henry Messmer of Milwaukee in Romanesque Revival style, with rusticated limestone foundations supporting cream brick walls. The general form is a large gable roof with a square centered tower at the front (pictured). High in the tower is a rose window, above that a belfry clad in ornamental sheet metal, and then a slate-roofed spire topped with a Latin cross. Across the front is a brick narthex added in 1939. The church's sides feature round-arched stained-glass windows. At the back is a semi-octagonal apse. The nave inside is little changed since the 1800s, with the original oak pews, a plaster barrel vault ceiling, and the original Baroque-styled carved wood reredos. The cornerstone was laid in 1890 and the church was dedicated in 1892.

The convent was built in 1889, before the church building. It is a 2 1/2-story building designed by Herman Schnetzky of Milwaukee in simplified Romanesque Revival style.

The rectory behind the church was built in 1890, originally as the parish's elementary school. This building also was designed by Messmer but in Neoclassical style, with a rusticated limestone foundation, cream brick walls above that, and a hip roof. Above the centered entrance is a lunette window. In 1912 the building was converted to a rectory.

The second elementary school was built in 1912, a 2 1/2-story Romanesque Revival building designed by Erhard Brielmaier and Sons in a style rather old-fashioned for 1912, to match the other buildings. The building has some Gothic Revival-style decorations and an oculus in each gable. Inside, the rooms have hardwood floors and plastered walls.

Prior to the construction of the school building in 1912, the site adjacent to the church was occupied by ̇St. Peter's Chapel. Dating to 1839, this wooden edifice in Gothic Revival style is Milwaukee's oldest Catholic church. It was originally St. Peter's Cathedral and stood at the northwest corner of State and Jackson Streets in Milwaukee. The status of cathedral was shifted in 1854 to St. John the Evangelist on Jackson Street. St. Peter's was moved to Cramer Street in 1889, where it stood next to St. Peter and Paul's Roman Catholic Church as St. Peter's Chapel. With the construction of the school it was moved to Murray Avenue, south of the convent, from 1912 to 1938, when it was moved again to St. Francis Seminary on South Lake Drive. It was moved for the fourth time to the open-air state historical museum Old World Wisconsin in 1975.

The parish added a three-story elementary school in 1956. The school is not included in the National Register nomination.

The complex is listed on the National Register of Historic Places for its architectural significance. Each building has a distinct design, but apart from the 1956 school, they harmonize in materials and era, and together, the turn-of-the-century ensemble is remarkably intact.
