= Newberry Boulevard Historic District =

Historic district in Milwaukee, Wisconsin

- U.S. National Register of Historic Places
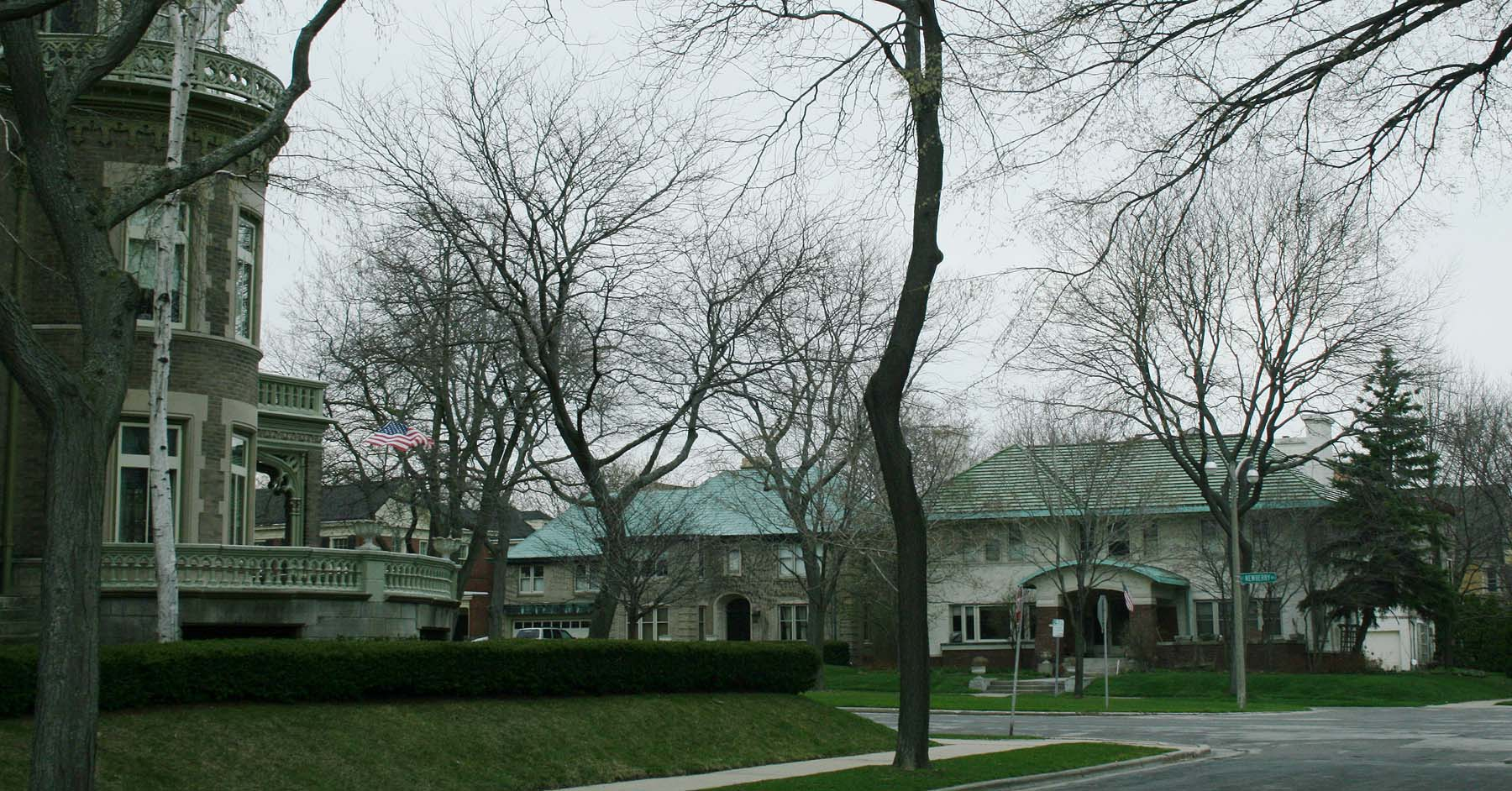
- Newberry Blvd. and Summit Ave. looking northwest, the Goldberg House on the left, the Luedke and Schroeder houses beyond

- Location within Wisconsin Location within the United States
- Location: 1802–3000 East Newberry Boulevard
- Nearest city: Milwaukee, Wisconsin
- Coordinates: 43°04′09″N 87°52′59″W
- Built: 1875–1899, 1900–24, 1925–1949
- Architect: Multiple
- NRHP reference No.: 94000137
- Added to NRHP: March 7, 1994

The Newberry Boulevard Historic District is an architecturally and historically significant residential area that includes houses on both sides of East Newberry Boulevard, in the East Side district of Milwaukee, Wisconsin. It was added to the National Register of Historic Places in 1994.

== History ==
Newberry Boulevard was the first in what was meant to be a series of boulevards that would connect the city's parks, a project that was never completed. However, the early history of the street lacked uniformity in planning. The parts of four subdivisions, platted between 1888 and 1894, make up the boulevard. Caspar, Donohue, and Hoff's subdivision, which included two blocks at the western end of the boulevard, from Oakland Avenue to Murray Avenue, with the plat map recorded on August 7, 1888, including what was then Newberry Street. The Maryland Park subdivision, which included the two-block stretch from Murray to Maryland Avenue, was platted in 1889. The Prospect Hill subdivision, which included the four blocks from Downer Avenue to Lake Drive, was recorded on February 3, 1893. Edmund Cummings's Newberry Boulevard Addition, from Maryland to Downer, was the last section to be platted, on July 31, 1894.

== Selected houses ==
Street Address	Year built	Original Owner	Architect	Architectural Style	Material	Notes
1812–1814 E. Newberry Blvd.	1916	Unknown	Hugo Miller ?	English Revival	Clapboard	
1915 E. Newberry Blvd.	1899	Unknown	F. W. Andree	Colonial Revival; Georgian Revival	Clapboard	
2015 E. Newberry Blvd.	1917	James Maitland	R. Messmer and Brothers	Bungalow	Brick	
2028–2030 E. Newberry Blvd.	1913	Unknown	R. Messmer and Brothers	Bungalow	Stucco	
2126–2128 E. Newberry Blvd.	1902	J. Herbert Green	John Rohr	Colonial Revival; Queen Anne	Brick	
2773 N. Maryland Ave.	1910 (1918, 1924)	William Henry Halsey	Ferry and Clas	Georgian Revival	Brick	
2228 E. Newberry Blvd.	1930	Charles Boltz	Fred Graf	English Revival	Brownstone	
2229 E. Newberry Blvd.	1919	Fred D. Doepke	Leenhouts and Guthrie	Colonial Revival; Georgian Revival	Brick	
2316 E. Newberry Blvd.	1925	Dr. Charles Zimmermann	Unknown	Mediterranean Revival	Brick	
2415 E. Newberry Blvd.	1900	Guido Wiggenhorn	Van Ryn and De Gelleke	English Revival	Brick	
2422 E. Newberry Blvd.	1908	Howland Russell	Howland Russell	Arts and Crafts	Stucco	
2423 E. Newberry Blvd.	1908	Joseph Meisenheimer	Buemming and Dick	American Foursquare	Brick	
2430 E. Newberry Blvd.	1921	Dr. Thomas Robinson Bours	Russell Barr Williamson	Prairie School	Brick	
2508 E. Newberry Blvd.	1923	Edward H. Williams	Fred Wilk	Prairie School	Brick	
2530 E. Newberry Blvd.	1926	John G. Wolleager	Wesley S. Hess	English Revival	Brick	
2761 N. Downer Ave.	1925	Pauline and Frank N. Treis	Unknown	English Revival	Brick	
2620 E. Newberry Blvd.	1923	Charles O. Chapline	George Schley and Sons	Colonial Revival; Georgian Revival	Brick	
2628 E. Newberry Blvd.	1911	Herman A. Wagner	V. W. Coddington	German Renaissance Revival	Brick	
2716 E. Newberry Blvd.	1923	August J. Luedke	Buemming and Guth	Colonial Revival	Brick	
2726 E. Newberry Blvd.	1909	Frederick J. Schroeder	Herman W. Buemming	Prairie School	Stucco	
2727 E. Newberry Blvd.	1896	Benjamin M. Goldberg	John A. Moller; George C. Ehlers	French Revival	Brick	
2824 E. Newberry Blvd.	1904 (1911)	John A. Smith	H. J. Rotier	Arts and Crafts	Brick	
2825 E. Newberry Blvd.	1929	Walter Harnischfeger	Herman W. Buemming	English Revival	Limestone	
2808 N. Shepard Ave.	1931	Edith M. Smith	Richard Philipp	Colonial Revival	Limestone	
2909 E. Newberry Blvd.	1917	Carl A. Miller	Charles Valentine	Neoclassical	Limestone	
2914 E. Newberry Blvd.	1922	Dr. Curtis A. Evans	Fitzhugh Scott	English Revival	Brick	
2924 E. Newberry Blvd.	1897	Ira B. Smith	Ferry and Clas	Colonial Revival	Brick	
2927 E. Newberry Blvd.	1909 (or 1910)	Charles J. Reilly	Alexander C. Eschweiler	Jacobean Revival	Brick	
2773 N. Lake Dr.	1930	Philip A. Koehring	Herman W. Buemming	English Revival	Limestone	
3000 E. Newberry Blvd.	1914	Albert F. Gallun	Brust and Philipp	Tudor Style	Limestone	

== See also ==
- National Register of Historic Places listings in Milwaukee
