= Wisconsin Idea Theatre =

The Wisconsin Idea Theatre was essentially a cultural program, developed at the University of Wisconsin c. 1943. It was headed by Robert E. Gard within the College of Agriculture, with a mission for developing theatre arts throughout the state. Gard worked with anyone that had an idea, to develop radio dramas, or stage performances. He worked with 4-H, seeking to develop children's theatre within the state, as well as encouraging and assisting faith groups to develop dramas based on their faith.

In 1945, Gard founded the Wisconsin Idea Theatre Conference, which attempted to represent all theatre interests across the state.

== History ==
The Wisconsin Idea Theatre began when Robert M. La Follette, Sr. and Charles Van Hise attended the University of Wisconsin. They were close friends, both influenced by the progressive ideals of economics professor John Bascom. La Follette went on to become governor, while Van Hise became President of the University. They had a mutual vision of a government "infused with the talent of trained professionals, guided by the expertise of our wisest scholars and answerable to an active and well-educated citizenry."

In order to realise this ideal, they turned the University towards educating not only its students, but encouraging and teaching residents across the state. Correspondence courses were offered, along with traveling faculty. The Governor held regular meetings with the professors of the University to keep in touch, and to encourage their progress.

Van Hise's successor, President Glen Frank, had a passion for expanding the arts, and hired Dean Chris Christensen to head the College of Agriculture, hoping to encourage farmers, and their families to be more creative.

Christensen then hired Aldo Leopold, a well-known conservationist, John Stuart Curry, an artist, and Robert E. Gard. It was Gard that founded the Wisconsin Idea Theatre.

== Suggested reading ==
The Wisconsin Idea Theatre : a program in statewide drama, Junius Eddy, 1949. Record at the HathiTrust Digital Library
