= Wolski's Tavern =

Bar in Milwaukee, Wisconsin, U.S.

Wolski's Tavern is a family-owned bar located on the Lower East Side of Milwaukee, Wisconsin.

== History ==
Wolksi's was founded in 1908 by Bernard Wolski. The tavern was originally located on Brady Street, but moved operations to nearby Pulaski Street. Since its founding, the bar has remained in the same family for four generations.

== Stickers ==
The bar is perhaps best known for its "I closed Wolski's" bumper stickers, which are given out to patrons who remain in the establishment until closing time. The stickers are found across Milwaukee and at locations around the world. According to the current owner, the tradition began in 1973.

== In media ==
In 2012, Esquire featured Wolski's while proclaiming Milwaukee the "Best Bar City" in the United States.

Wolski's appeared in an episode of the former HDNet series, Drinking Made Easy.
