= Milwaukee Film Festival =

Film festival held in Milwaukee, Wisconsin

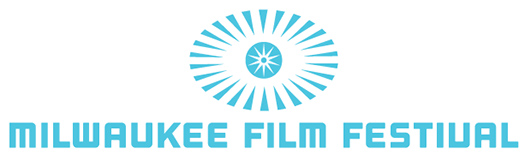

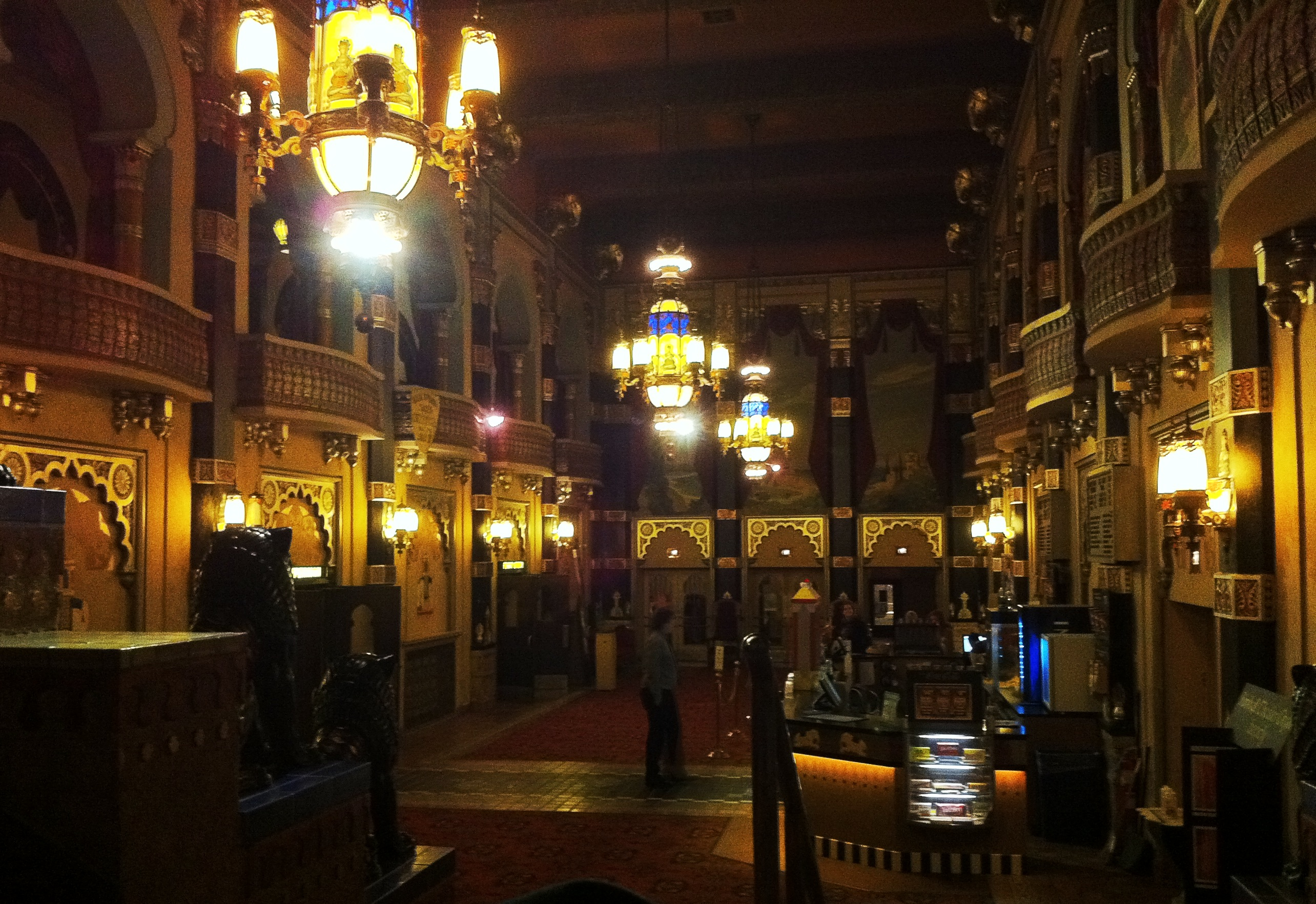
- Location: Milwaukee, Wisconsin, United States
- Founded: 2009
- Hosted by: Milwaukee Film
- Language: International
- Website: mkefilm.org

The Milwaukee Film Festival is a public film festival held each spring, typically from late April through early May, in Milwaukee, Wisconsin. The festival is organized by Milwaukee Film, a cultural arts organization that operates Milwaukee's historic movie palace, The Oriental Theatre, and facilitates year-long programming and initiatives using film to inspire community, artistry, education, and joy.

In 2015, 304 films from more than 50 countries were screened at five Milwaukee County venues, with nearly 71,000 attendees.

Founded in 2009, after the Milwaukee International Film Festival was discontinued, the Milwaukee Film Festival is the fifth largest film festival in the United States in terms of attendance, the number of films screened and festival length. In 2019, the festival had record-high attendance with 87,618 people in attendance.

Susan Kerns is executive director of Milwaukee Film.

== Theaters ==
- Oriental Theatre - East Side, Milwaukee, Wisconsin
- Downer Theatre - East Side, Milwaukee, Wisconsin

=== Past Venues ===
- Avalon Atmospheric Theater & Lounge - Bay View, Milwaukee, Wisconsin
- Fox Bay Cinema Grill - Whitefish Bay, Milwaukee, Wisconsin
- Jan Serr Studio Cinema - East Side, Milwaukee, Wisconsin
- Times Cinema - Washington Heights, Milwaukee, Wisconsin

== See also ==
- List of film festivals
- Film industry in Wisconsin
- Wisconsin Film Festival
