= Leonard Schmidtner =

Polish-born American architect

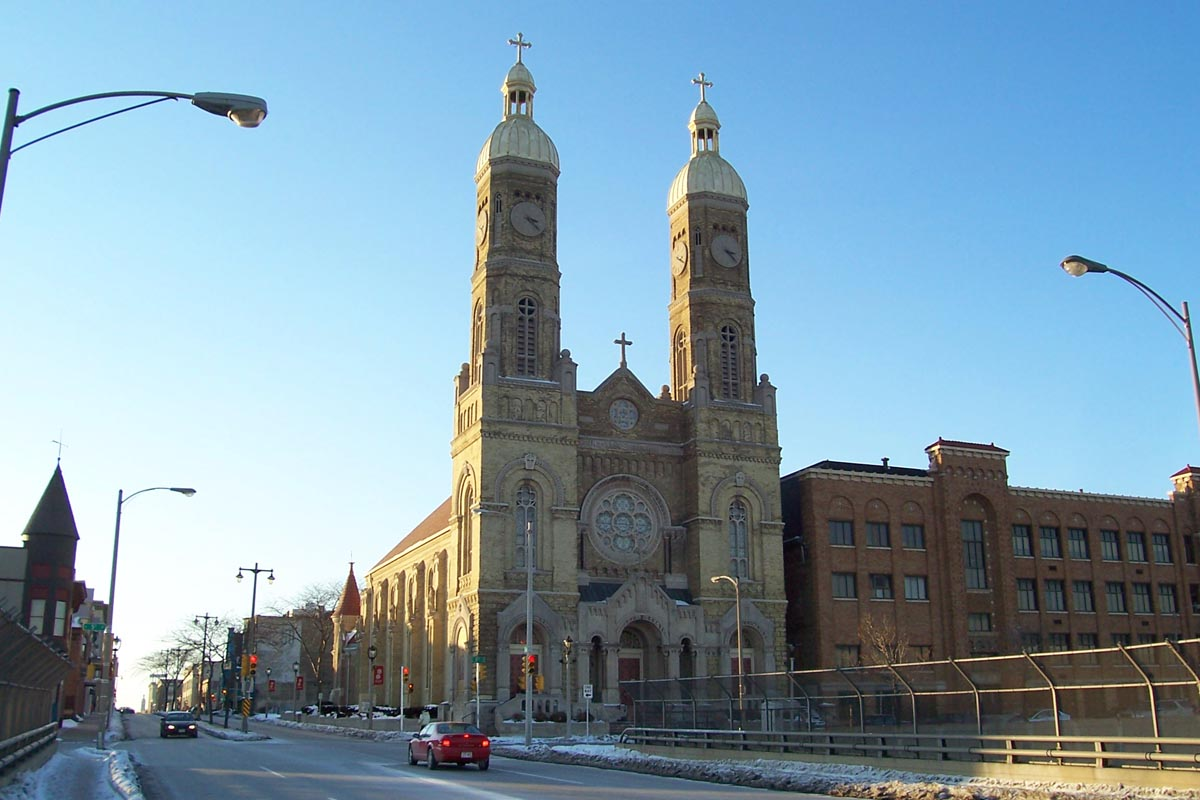
St. Stanislaus Catholic Church

Leonard A. Schmidtner, born Leonard Kowalski, was a Polish architect who moved to Milwaukee, Wisconsin, and designed the former Milwaukee County Courthouse, a bell tower for Holy Trinity Church (1862) on South 4th and West Bruce Streets, and St. Stanislaus Catholic Church. He was one of the first Poles in the city, spoke German, and adopted the name Schmidtner (Polish "Kowal" is German "Schmidt") to help establish himself.

== Projects ==
- Davis Dry goods store (1860)
- bell tower (1862) for Holy Trinity Roman Catholic Church at 605 South 4th and West Bruce Streets in Milwaukee. Listed on the National Register of Historic Places.
- St. Stanislaus Catholic Church at 1681 South 5th Street in Milwaukee. Renovated 1962 and gold leaf applied to domes.
- former Milwaukee County Courthouse
