= Wacław Kruszka =

American journalist

Wacław (Wenceslaus) Kruszka
- Born: 1868; Province of Posen, Prussia
- Died: 1937 (aged 68–69); Wisconsin
- Known for: Priest, journalist, social activist, and author

Wacław Kruszka was a Polish-American priest, journalist, social activist, and author.

== Biography ==
Wacław (Wenceslaus) Kruszka was born in 1868 near Gnesen in the Prussian Province of Posen, one of 13 children. Kruszka's brother Simon, a Catholic priest, had been imprisoned during Otto Von Bismarck's Kulturkampf for protesting restrictions placed on the church and Polish culture. Wacław decided to follow his brother into the ministry, and initially studied with the Jesuits. He was forced to leave the order following some disagreements with the clergy. Kruszka then decided to follow his half brother, Michael Kruszka, to Milwaukee, Wisconsin, in 1893 to avoid increasing political persecution and the Prussian military draft. Michael Kruszka was the editor of a successful Milwaukee newspaper, the Kuryer Polski, which was the first Polish language daily in the United States. Wacław Kruszka entered the St. Francis Seminary and was ordained as a priest on June 16, 1895. He began assisting at St. Casimir on the East Side and then became a teacher at the school at St. Josaphat Basilica.

Kruszka was suddenly transferred by the Archdiocese of Milwaukee to a small parish in Ripon, Wisconsin, after allegations were made that he had fathered an illegitimate child with his housekeeper. He vehemently denied the allegations, but did end up paying for the economic maintenance of the mother and child. Whether or not this was an admission of guilt will never be known. Father Kruszka shared his brother's skills in journalism and writing, and while in Ripon he began writing articles for the Kuryer. He also found the time to learn 8 foreign languages.

Wacław Kruszka argued passionately for the appointment of a Polish Bishop for Milwaukee. Poles now were 22% of the population of Milwaukee, and the second largest ethnic group after the Germans. But the Milwaukee church hierarchy was dominated by German and Irish factions, who saw little justification to include a Pole within its leadership. Kruszka's passionate position on this matter put him not only at odds with the Milwaukee archdiocese but many fellow Polish priests as well, who agreed with Kruszka's goal but frowned on his confrontational and divisive tactics.

While in Ripon, Kruszka then began the monumental task of documenting the history of Poles in the United States. Called The History of Poles in the United States (Historya Polska w Ameryce), it was first serialized in the Kuryer on September 5, 1901. It was eventually released as 13 volumes between 1905 and 1908. The History of Poles has been criticized in some circles for some inaccuracies and bias, but remains a landmark document for the history of immigration in America.

Kruszka traveled to Rome on a mission in 1903 to meet with Pope Pius X and present his arguments for a Polish bishop in America. He was received cordially, and the Pope sent an emissary from the Vatican to investigate the situation.

After several setbacks, on July 29, 1908, the church finally relented and appointed the first Polish bishop, Paul Peter Rhode, in Chicago. While this action brought some temporary peace to the situation, there still was tremendous pressure in Milwaukee for recognition of the 16 Polish churches within the local church leadership. The breakaway Polish National Catholic Church had established itself in Milwaukee and was attracting converts. Rhode traveled to Milwaukee and met with Archbishop Sebastian Gebhard Messmer (a Swiss German) in an attempt to defuse the tension.

As a result of these discussions, Kruszka was offered the pastorage of St. Adalbert's Parish in Milwaukee which effectively ended his exile in Ripon. Messmer attempted to further placate the Polish community by appointing a Polish-speaking Bohemian, Joseph Maria Koudelka, as auxiliary bishop in Milwaukee. Kruszka was stridently opposed to this decision, which he saw as tokenism and an insult to Poles. While visiting St. Casimir's Parish in Kenosha, Kruszka declared that Bishop Koudelka would have to "walk over my corpse" to enter St. Adalbert's church for Mass. Kruszka was forced to apologize for this remark and sign a written allegiance to the church.

Finally, in November 1913, a Polish-speaking bishop was appointed for Milwaukee. Father Edward Kozlowski had been born on November 21, 1860, in Tarnów, in the Austrian occupied part of Poland, and previously defused similar situations with angry Polish parishioners in Michigan. Kozlowski had the diplomatic skills sorely needed in Milwaukee to heal wounds between Messmer and Kruszka.

Kruszka was elated by the decision, and the conflict between himself and the archdiocese eventually subsided. His focus went back to his mission of ministering to Milwaukee's Polish community and he went on to serve the St. Adalbert's parish for many years, which grew and prospered.

Kruszka died on Thanksgiving Day in 1937 at the age of 69. He was much loved by his parishioners and nearly 10,000 attended his funeral. At his funeral service, Cardinal Samuel Stritch went on the record saying:

The deceased had two aims in his life: Catholicism and Poland, and for these two goals, he worked unceasingly.

== Sources ==
Sources:

- Borun, Thaddeus, We, the Milwaukee Poles (Milwaukee: Nowiny Publishing Co. 1946)
- Skendzel, Eduard Adam "Who Was Wenceslaus Kruszka?" U.S. Catholic Historian pp. 61–62
- Kuznewski, Anthony J. Faith and Fatherland (Notre Dame: Notre Dame Press 1980)
- Kruszka, Wacław A History of Poles in America to 1908 (Washington D.C. 2001)

== See also ==
- St. Adalbert's Church Milwaukee, WI
