= St. Hedwig's (Milwaukee) =

Coordinates: 43°03′11.4″N 87°53′51.7″W

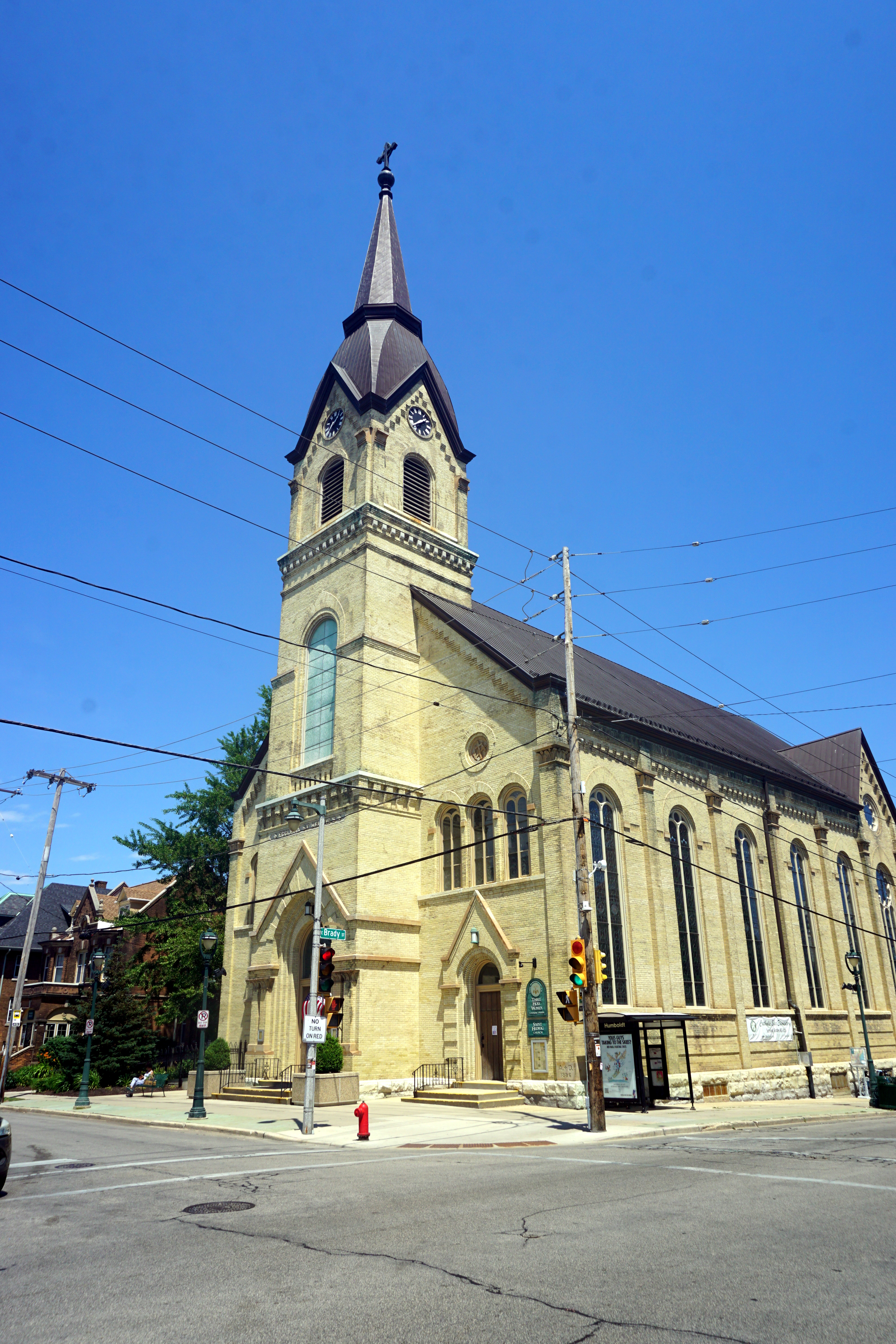
St. Hedwig's Roman Catholic Church

St. Hedwig's Roman Catholic Church (Kościół Świętej Jadwigi in Polish) is a church and former Catholic parish at 1702 N. Humboldt Ave in Milwaukee, Wisconsin's East Brady Street Historic District, in the Roman Catholic Archdiocese of Milwaukee. It is dedicated to St. Hedwig (Jadwiga of Poland) and was designed by Henry Messmer.
