= Oriental Theatre (Milwaukee) =

Movie theater in Milwaukee, Wisconsin

Coordinates: 43.059657°N 87.885664°W

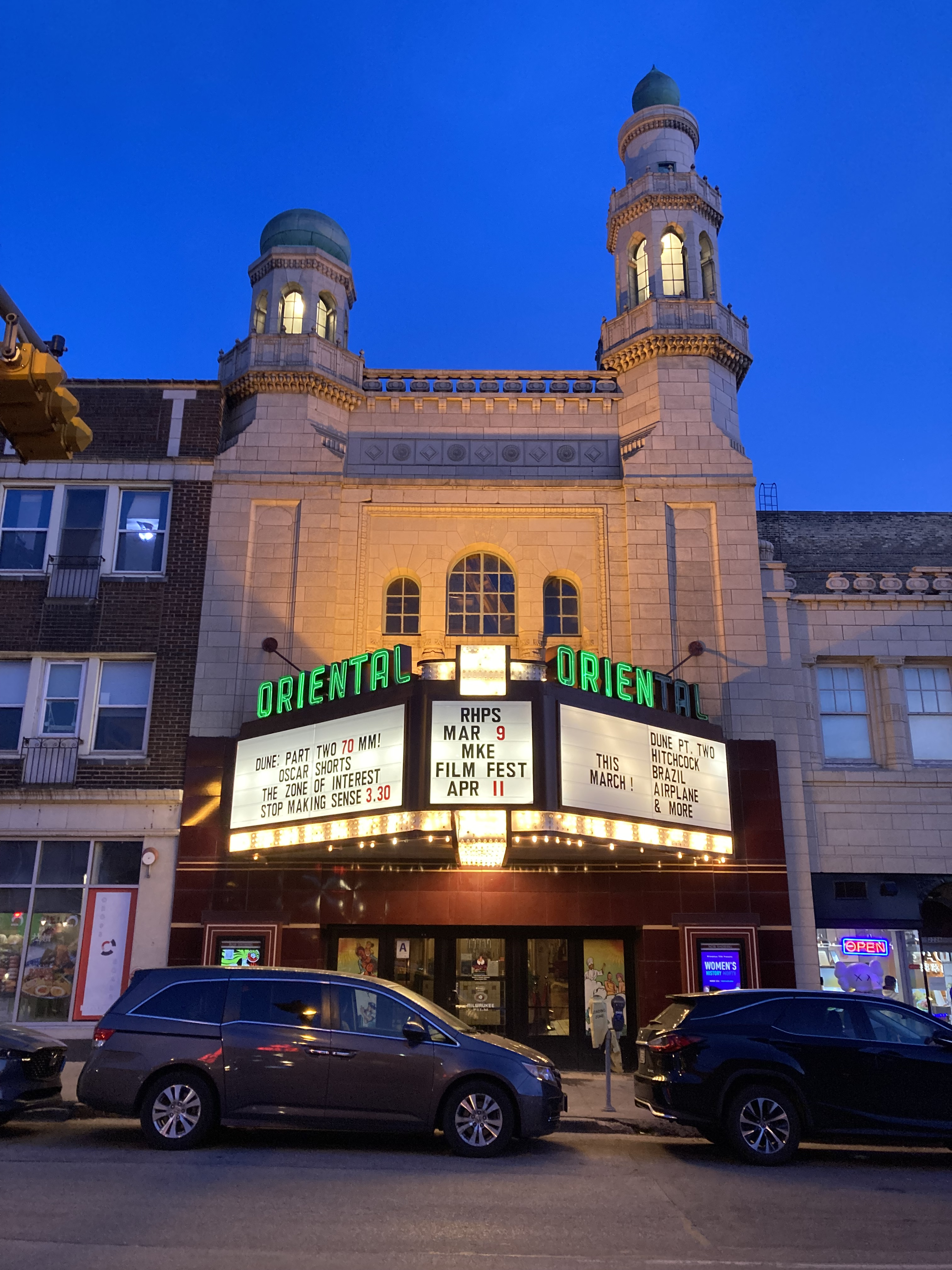
- Front exterior of the theater in 2024
- Interactive map of Oriental Theatre
- Address: 2230 North Farwell Avenue; Milwaukee; United States
- Owner: New Land Enterprises LLP
- Operator: Milwaukee Film
- Capacity: 1530
- Public transit: MCTS

Construction
- Opened: July 2, 1927; 99 years ago
- Architects: Gustave A. Dick; Alex Bauer

Website
- https://mkefilm.org/oriental-theatre/about/about-oriental-theatre

Oriental Theatre is a theater in Milwaukee, Wisconsin operated by Milwaukee Film. The theater was built and opened in 1927 as a movie palace with East Indian decor. It is said to be the only movie palace to incorporate East Indian artwork. Designed by Gustave A. Dick and Alex Bauer, the theater has two minaret towers, three stained glass chandeliers, several hand-drawn murals, six bigger-than-life Buddhas, dozens of original draperies, eight porcelain lions, and hundreds of elephants.

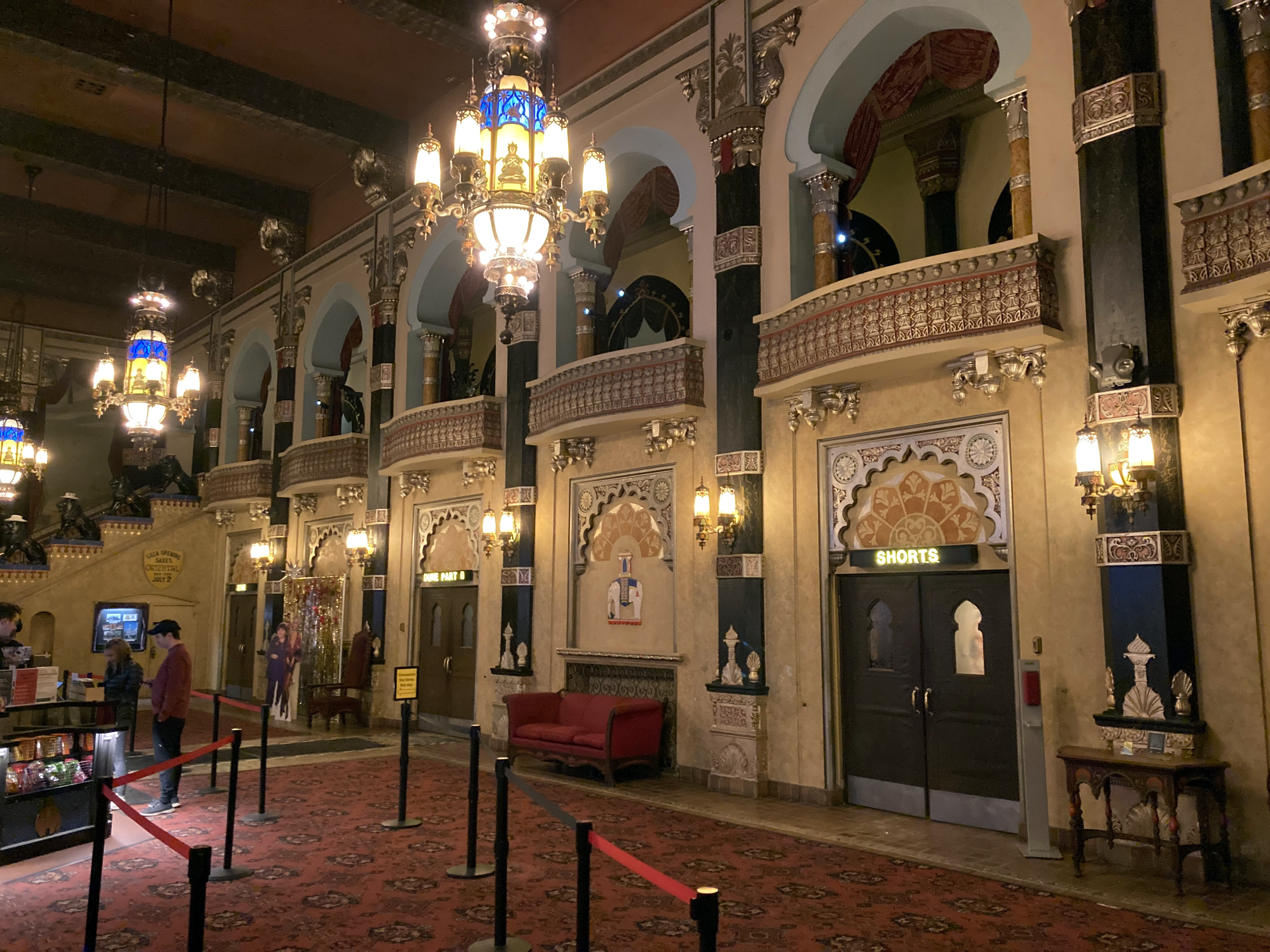
Main lobby

The Oriental Theatre has been showing independent and art films, as well as a few blockbuster Hollywood films.

The theater is the world record holder for continual showings of The Rocky Horror Picture Show. It has hosted the film as a Saturday midnight movie since January 1978.

In 2005, the theater was dubbed one of the "10 Theaters Doing It Right" by Entertainment Weekly.

In 2016, local artists oversaw the installation of a new street art destination in the alley behind the Oriental Theater, and named it the Black Cat Alley. As a part of the Black Cat Alley installation, French artist MTO painted a large mural of a green frog entitled "MTO's Bug" on the south wall of the theater, facing Kenilworth Avenue. The theater building was listed on the National Register of Historic Places in 2023.

In July 2018, Milwaukee Film started leasing the theater and began running it as a non-profit.

== See also ==
- Downer Theatre, another theater operated by Milwaukee Film
- Milwaukee Film Festival, a film festival hosted inside the Oriental Theatre
- Oriental Theatre (Chicago)
- Oriental Theatre (Portland, Oregon)
