= St. Stanislaus Catholic Church (Milwaukee) =

Church in Milwaukee, Wisconsin, United States

Coordinates: 43°00′45″N 87°55′02″W

St. Stanislaus Church
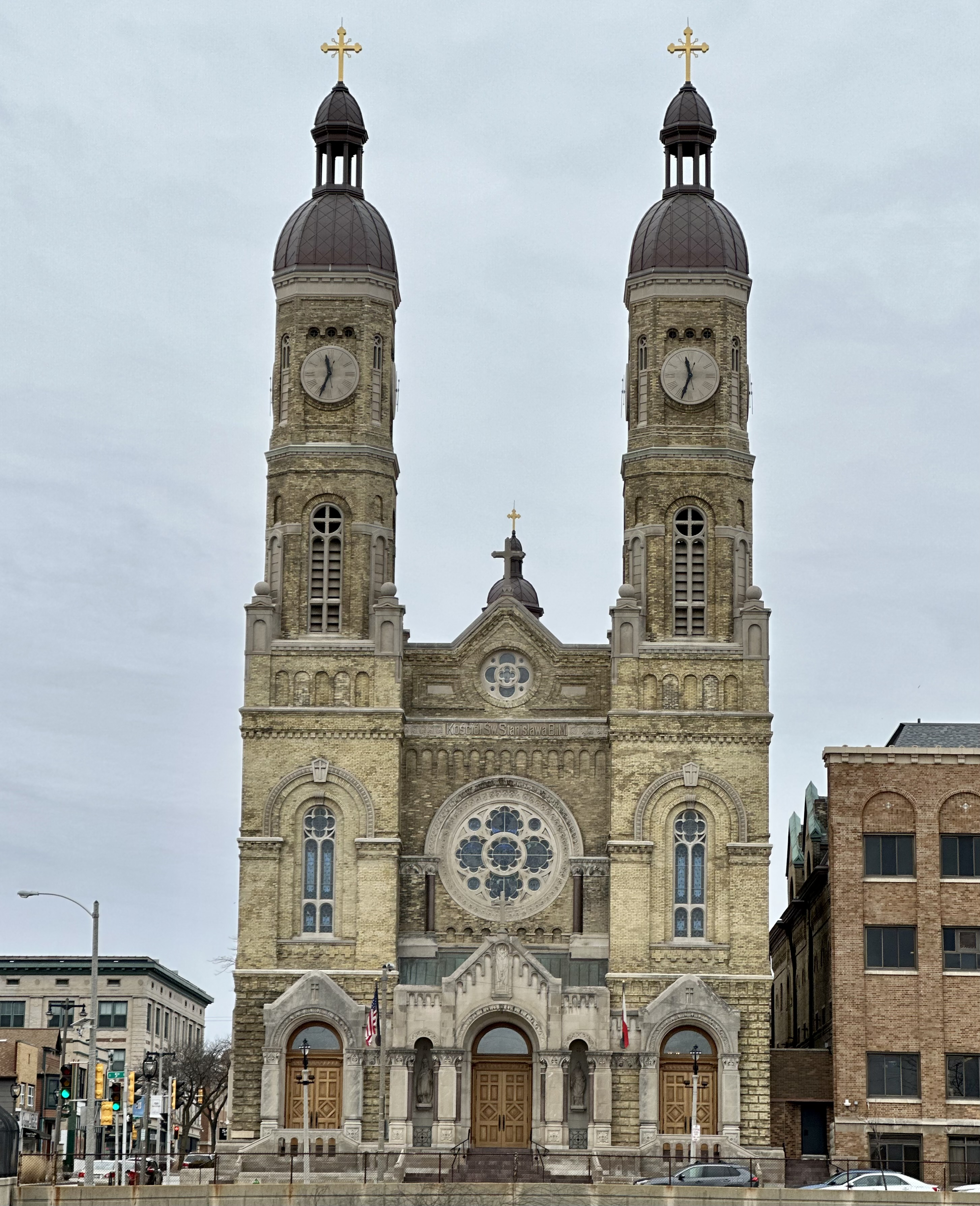
- St. Stanislaus Catholic Oratory

- Location within Wisconsin
- Location: Milwaukee
- Country: United States
- Denomination: Roman Catholic
- Website: St. Stanislaus Oratory

History
- Founded: 1866
- Dedication: St. Stanislaus

Architecture
- Functional status: Active
- Architect: Leonard Schmidtner
- Architectural type: Church
- Style: Polish Cathedral
- Groundbreaking: 1866
- Completed: 1873

Specifications
- Materials: Brick

St. Stanislaus Roman Catholic Oratory (Polish: Kościół Świętego Stanisława) is a Roman Catholic parish in the historic Mitchell Street District of Milwaukee, Wisconsin.

One of Milwaukee's Polish Cathedrals, the parish was founded in 1866 by immigrant immigrant Poles in the Archdiocese of Milwaukee.
