= List of churches in the Archdiocese of Milwaukee =

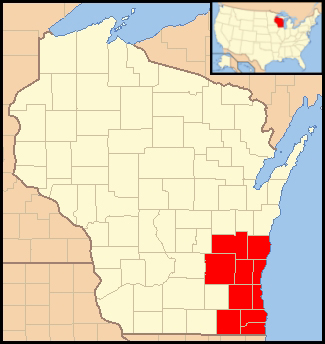
Archdiocese of Milwaukee in red

This is a list of current and former Roman Catholic churches in the Roman Catholic Archdiocese of Milwaukee. The archdiocese included 195 churches (as of May 2020), covering the following 10 Wisconsin counties:

- Dodge
- Fond du Lac
- Kenosha
- Milwaukee
- Ozaukee
- Racine
- Sheboygan
- Walworth
- Washington
- Waukesha

The cathedral church of the archdiocese is the Cathedral of St. John the Evangelist in Milwaukee

== Milwaukee ==
Name	Image	Location	Description/Notes
Cathedral of St. John the Evangelist		812 N. Jackson St.	German Renaissance Revival style cathedral built in 1847; listed on the National Register of Historic Places (NRHP)
All Saints		4051 N. 25th St.	Clustered with St. Martin of Porres Parish
Basilica of St. Josaphat		603 W. Lincoln Ave.	Founded in 1888 for Polish immigrants, became the largest Polish parish in Wisconsin. Church dedicated in 1901, declared a basilica in 1929
Blessed Sacrament		3100 S. 41st St.	Founded in 1926, church dedicated in 1956
Blessed Savior		8545 W. Villard Ave.	Founded in 2007 with merger of Corpus Christi, Mary Queen of Martyrs, Our Lady of Sorrows, and St. Phillip Neri Parishes
Congregation of the Great Spirit		1000 W. Lapham St.	Founded in 1989 for American Indians
Gesu		1145 W. Wisconsin Ave.	Founded in 1849, church dedicated in 1894. Located on Marquette University campus
Holy Rosary		2011 N. Oakland Ave.	Church consecrated in 1885. Holy Rosary merged in 2000 into the Three Holy Women Parish
Holy Trinity		605 S. 4th St.	Romanesque Revival church dedicated in 1850; listed on NRHP; now known as Our Lady of Guadalupe
Mother of Good Counsel		6924 W. Lisbon Ave.	Founded in 1925, church dedicated in 1975
Old St. Mary		844 N. Broadway	Oldest existing church in Milwaukee. Founded in 1846 for German immigrants. Church dedicated in 1847. Listed on the NRHP
Our Lady of Divine Providence		2600 N. Bremen St.	Founded in 2003 with merger of St. Casimir and St. Mary of Czestochowa Parishes
Our Lady of Lourdes		3722 S. 58th St.	Founded in 1958. Church dedicated in 1960
Our Lady, Queen of Peace		3222 S. 29th St.	Founded in 1953, church started in 1957
Prince of Peace		1138 S. 25th St.	Founded in 1999
St. Adalbert		1923 W. Becher St.	Founded in 1908 for Polish immigrants. Romanesque Revival church dedicated in 1931
St. Anthony		1711 S. 9th St.	Founded in 1872 for German immigrants. Church consecrated in 1872
St. Augustine of Hippo		2530 S. Howell Ave.	Founded in 1887 for German immigrants
St. Benedict the Moor		930 W. State St.	Founded as mission in 1908 for African-Americans. Operated by the Capuchin Province of St. Joseph
St. Bernadette		8200 W. Denver Ave.	Founded in 1958, church consecrated in 1961. Part of Northwest Milwaukee Catholic Parishes
St. Catherine		5101 W. Center St.	Part of the Milwaukee West-side Catholic Parishes
St. Catherine of Alexandria		8661 N. 76th Pl.	Founded in 1855. Church dedicated in 1921. Part of Northwest Milwaukee Catholic Parishes
St. Francis of Assisi		1927 Vel R. Phillips Ave,	Founded in 1871. Church dedicated in 1877
St. Gregory the Great		3160 S. 63rd St,	Founded in 1955, church dedicated in 1957
St. Hedwig		1702 N. Humboldt Ave.	Founded in 1871, the second Polish parish in Milwaukee. Church consecrated in 1887. St. Hedwig merged in 2000 into the Three Holy Women Parish
St. Hyacinth		1414 W. Becher St.	Founded in 1883 for Polish immigrants by Monsignor Jacek Gulski. Church dedicated in 1883
St. Joan of Arc Chapel		Marquette University campus,	Chapel constructed in France in 1420, moved to New York State in 1920s, relocated to Marquette University in 1962
St. Margaret Mary		3970 N. 92nd St,	Founded in 1955, church dedicated in 1977
St. Matthias		9306 W. Beloit Rd.	Founded in 1850
St. Patrick		723 W. Washington St.	Founded in 1876 for Irish immigrants. Church consecrated in 1893; listed on NRHP
St. Paul		1720 E. Norwich Ave.	
Ss. Cyril and Methodius		2427 S. 15th St.	Polish and English parish
Ss Peter and Paul		2490 N. Cramer St.	Founded in 1889, church dedicated in 1892. Listed on NRHP
St. Rafael the Archangel		2059 S. 33rd St.	
St. Roman		1710 W. Bolivar Ave.	Founded in 1956, church dedicated in 1960
St. Rose of Lima		540 N. 31st St.	Clustered with St. Michael Parish
St. Sebastian		5400 W. Washington Blvd.	Founded in 1911. Church dedicated in 1930
St. Stanislaus		524 W. Historic Mitchell St.	Founded in 1866 as first Polish church in Milwaukee. Church dedicated in 1873
St. Vincent de Paul		2114 W. Mitchell St.	Founded for Polish immigrants, church dedicated in 1888

== Fond du Lac and North Fond du Lac ==
Name	Image	Location	Description/Notes
Dorcas Chapel		45 S. National Ave, Fond du Lac	Contemporary chapel built in 1966 at Marian University
Holy Family		271 4th St Way, Fond du Lac	The Holy Family Community includes St. Mary, Sacred Heart, St. Peter, Holy Family, Risen Saviour and Presentation of the Blessed Virgin Mary Parishes.
Sons of Zebedee		W5882 Church Rd, Fond du Lac	Founded in 1998 as merger of St. James and St. John Parishes. Now affiliated with St. Mary Parish in Lomira
Presentation of the Blessed Virgin Mary		701 Michigan Ave, North Fond du Lac	Part of the Holy Family Community

== Kenosha ==
Name	Image	Location	Description/Notes
Our Lady of the Holy Rosary of Pompeii		2224 45th St.	Founded in 1904 for Italian immigrants, church dedicated in 1932
Our Lady of Mount Carmel		1919 54th St.	Founded in 1931, church dedicated in 1964.
St. Anthony of Padua		2223 51st St.	Founded in 1910 for Slovak immigrants, church dedicated in 1930
St. Elizabeth		4816 7th Ave.	Founded in 2000 with the merger of St. George and St. Casimir Parishes Now part of Downtown Kenosha Catholic
St. James		5804 Sheridan Rd.	First Catholic parish in Kenosha. Founded in 1837 as St. Mark for Irish immigrants, later renamed as St. James. Church dedicated in 1883 Now part of Downtown Kenosha Catholic
St. Mark		7117 14th Ave.	Founded in 1924, church dedicated in 1970
St. Mary		7307 40th Ave.	Founded in 1929
St. Peter		2224 30th Ave.	Founded in 1902 for Lithuanian immigrants, church dedicated in 1966
St. Therese of Lisieux		2020 91st St.	Founded in 1952, church dedicated in 1959

== Racine ==
Name	Image	Location	Description/Notes
Sacred Heart		2201 Northwestern Ave.	Founded in early 1900s, church dedicated in 1968
St. Edward		1401 Grove Ave.	Founded in 1919, church dedicated in 1953
St. John Nepomuk		1903 Green St.	Founded in 1895 for Czech immigrants, church dedicated in 1928
St. Joseph		533 Erie St.	Founded in 1875, church dedicated in 1876
St. Lucy		3101 Drexel Ave.	Founded in 1958, church dedicated in 1933
St. Mary by the Lake		7605 Lakeshore Dr.	Founded in 1849 for German immigrants. Church dedicated in 1853
St. Patrick		1100 Erie St.	Church built in 1925 with Neogothic/Art Deco design by Barry Byrne; listed on NRHP
St. Richard of Chichester		1509 Grand Ave.	Founded in 1998, church constructed in 1914. Merger of St. Rose of Lima, St. Stanislaus, St. Casimir and Holy Trinity Parishes
St. Rita		4339 Douglas Ave.	Founded in 1920s, church dedicated in 2005

== Sheboygan and Sheboygan Falls ==
Holy Name of Jesus, St. Clement and St. Dominic Parishes are consolidated in the Sheboygan North Catholic Parishes community. Immaculate Conception, Ss. Cyil and Methodius and St. Peter Claver are part of the Sheboygan South Catholic Parishes community.

Name	Image	Location	Description/Notes
Blessed Trinity		319 Giddings Ave, Sheboygan Falls	Founded in 2001 with merger of St. Mary, St. George and St. Rose of Lima Parishes
Holy Name of Jesus		818 Huron Ave, Sheboygan	Founded in 1845, dedicated in 1872 Part of Sheboygan North
Immaculate Conception		1305 Humboldt Ave, Sheboygan	Founded in 1903 for Lithuanian immigrants, church started in 1929. Part of Sheboygan South
St. Clement		707 N. 6th St, Sheboygan	Founded in 1914, church dedicated in 1915. Part of Sheboygan North
Ss. Cyril and Methodius		822 New Jersey Ave, Sheboygan	Founded 1907 for Slovenian and Croatian immigrants. Church dedicated in 1911. Part of Sheboygan South
St. Dominic		2133 N. 22nd St, Sheboygan	Founded in 1920, church started in 1965 Part of Sheboygan North
St. Peter Claver		1439 S. 12th St, Sheboygan	Founded in 1888, church dedicated in 1908. Part of Sheboygan South

== Waukesha ==
In 2012, the four churches in Waukesha were clustered into the Catholic Community of Waukesha, a central parish administration.

Name	Image	Location	Description/Notes
St. John Neumann		2400 WI-59	Founded in 1981, church dedicated in 1987
St. Joseph		818 N. East Ave.	Founded in 1855 in Milwaukee, moved to Waukesha in 1960s. Church dedicated in 1970
St. Mary		225 S. Hartwell Ave.	Founded in 1949, church dedicated in 1965
St. William		440 N. Moreland Blvd.	Founded in 1957, church dedicated in 1992

== Wauwatosa ==
Name	Image	Location	Description/Notes
Christ the King		2604 N. Swan Blvd	Founded in 1939
St. Bernard		1500 Wauwatosa Ave.	Founded in 1911, first Catholic church in Wauwatosa. Merged with Christ the King Parish in 2024
St. Joseph		12130 W. Center St.	Founded in 1855, church dedicated in 1970
St. Jude the Apostle		734 Glenview Ave.	Founded in 1929 to serve Irish immigrants.
St. Pius X		2506 Wauwatosa Ave.	Founded in 1952, church dedicated in 1953

== West Allis ==
Holy Assumption, St. Augustine and St. Rita Parishes are part of West Allis Catholic.

Name	Image	Location	Description/Notes
Holy Assumption		7109 W. Orchard St.	Part of West Allis Catholic
Mother of Perpetual Help		1121 S. 116th St.	Parish created from St. Aloysius, Immaculate Heart of Mary and Mary Queen of Heaven Parishes in West Allis
St. Augustine		6768 W. Rogers St.	Part of West Allis Catholic.
St. Rita		2318 S. 61st St.	Part of West Allis Catholic

== Other communities ==
Name	Image	Location	Description/Notes
Annunciation		305 W. Green St, Fox Lake	Found in 1998 with merger of Immaculate Conception, St. Randolph and St. Mary Parishes
Divine Mercy		800 Marquette Ave, South Milwaukee	Founded in 2003 with the merger of St. Adalbert, St. Mary, St. John and St. Sylvester Parishes
Divine Savior		05 Fredonia Ave, Fredonia	Founded in 2012 with the merger of St. Mary and Holy Rosary Parishes. Now clustered with Our Lady of the Lakes Parish.
Good Shepherd		N88 W17658 Christman Rd, Menomonee Falls	Founded in 1957, church consecrated in 1958
Holy Angels		138 N. 8th Ave, West Bend	Founded in 1852, church dedicated in 1915
Holy Apostles		16000 W. National Ave, New Berlin	Founded in 1855
Holy Cross		18700 116th St, Bristol	Part of the Catholic Community of St. Alphonsus, Holy Cross and St. John the Evangelist Parishes
Holy Family		304 Prairie St, Reeseville	Part of the Western Dodge County Catholic Churches
Holy Family		4825 N. Wildwood Ave, Whitefish Bay	Founded in 1949, church dedicated in 1969
Holy Trinity		315 Main St, Kewaskum	Clustered with St. Michael Parish
Holy Trinity		521 Congress St, Newburg	Founded in 1859
Immaculate Conception		1610 Monroe St, West Bend	Combined with St. Mary Parish
Immaculate Conception - St. Mary		108 McHenry St, Burlington	Part of Burlington Lyons Catholic Community
Nativity of the Lord		3672 E. Plankinton Ave, Cudahy	Founded in 2000 with the merger of St. Frederick, Holy Family and St. Joseph's Parishes
Lumen Christi		2750 W. Mequon Rd, Mequon	Founded in 2005 with the merger of St. Cecilia and St. James Parishes
Our Lady of the Holyland		308 S. County Rd W, Mount Calvary	
Our Lady of the Lakes		300 Butler St, Random Lake	Founded in 1998 as a merger of St. Mary’s, St. Nicholas, St. Patrick’s and St. Mary Parishes. Now clustered with Divine Savior Parish
Queen of Apostles		N35W23360 Capitol Dr, Pewaukee	Founded in 1999 with merger of Sts. Peter and Paul and St. Mary Parishes
Resurrection		209 Main St, Allenton	Founded in 1997 with the merger of St. Anthony of Padua and Ss. Peter and Paul Parishes
Sacred Heart		950 Washington St, Horicon	Founded in 2001. Clustered with St. Matthew Parish
Sacred Heart of Jesus		3635 S. Kinnickinnic Ave, St. Francis	Founded in 1868, church started in 1961
Shepherd of the Hills		W1562 County Road B, Eden	
St. Agnes		12801 W. Fairmount Ave, Butler	Founded in 1914, church dedicated in 1915
St. Alphonsus		6060 W. Loomis Rd, Greendale	Founded as mission in 1938. Church dedicated in 1950
St. Alphonsus		6301 344th Ave, New Munster	Part of the Catholic Community of St. Alphonsus, Holy Cross, and St. John the Evangelist
St. Andrew		714 E. Walworth Ave, Delavan	Founded in 1848, church constructed in 1899
St. Ann		9091 Prairie Ridge Blvd, Pleasant Prairie	Founded in 1998, church dedicated in 2004
St. Anthony		N74W13604 Appleton Ave, Menomonee Falls	Founded in 1846
St. Anthony on the Lake		W280N2101 Prospect Ave, Pewaukee	Founded in 1918
St. Benedict		137 Dewey Ave, Fontana-On-Geneva Lake	Founded in 1915, church dedicated in 1961
St. Boniface		W204 N11940 Goldendale Rd, Germantown	Founded in 1845 for Bavarian immigrants. Church consecrated in 1955
St. Bruno		226 W. Ottawa Ave, Dousman	Founded in 1842 for German immigrants. Church dedicated in 2005
St. Catherine of Alexandria		W359N8512 Brown St, Oconomowoc	Founded in 1849, church consecrated in 2000. Clustered with St. Joan of Arc Parish
St. Catherine of Siena		228 E. Blossom St, Ripon	Founded in 2005 with the merger of St. Patrick and St. Wenceslaus Parishes in Ripon
St. Charles		313 Circle Dr, Hartland	Founded in 1863, church constructed in 1956
St. Charles Borromeo		440 Kendall St, Burlington	Founded in 1908, church dedicated in 1910
St. Clare		7616 Fritz St, Wind Lake	Founded in 1965. church dedicated in 1969
St. Columbkille		W10802 County Rd T T, Columbus	Founded in 1850, church dedicated in 1965
St. Dominic		18255 W. Capitol Dr, Brookfield	Founded in 1956, church dedicated in 1956
St. Eugene		7600 N. Port Washington Rd, Fox Point	Founded in 1957, church dedicated in 1958
St. Frances Cabrini		1025 S. 7th Ave. West Bend	Founded in 1955, church dedicated in 1969
St. Francis Borgia		1425 Covered Bridge Rd, Cedarburg	Founded in 1844, church dedicated in 1970, merged with Divine Word Parish
St. Francis de Sales		148 W. Main St, Lake Geneva	Founded in 1842, church dedicated in 1892
St. Francis Xavier		1704 240th Ave, Kansasville	Part of the Kenosha-Racine County Line Catholic Parishes
St. Gabriel		1200 St. Gabriel Way, Hubertus	Founded in 2002 with merger of St. Columba, St. Hubert and St. Mary Parishes
St. James		7219 S. 27th St, Franklin	Founded in 1857, church dedicated in 1966
St. James		W220 N6588 Town Line Rd, Menomonee Falls	Founded in 1847, church dedicated in 1999
St. James the Less		830 E. Veterans Way, Mukwonago	Founded in 1896, church dedicated in 1975
St. Jerome		995 S Silver Lake St, Oconomowoc	Founded in 1870, church dedicated in 2008
St. Joan of Arc		120 Nashotah Rd, Nashotah	Clustered with St. Catherine of Alexandria Parish
St. John		W1170 Rome Rd, Rubicon	Clustered with St. Kilian and St. Matthew Parishes in 2024
St. John the Baptist		714 Church St, Clyman	Part of Western Dodge County Catholic Churches
St. John the Baptist		115 Plymouth St, Plymouth	Founded in 1848, church dedicated in 1987
St. John the Baptist		1501 172nd Ave, Union Grove	Part of the Kenosha-Racine County Line Catholic Parishes
St. John Evangelist		601 Valley Rd, Kohler	Founded in 1927, church dedicated in 1940
St. John Vianney		1755 N. Calhoun Rd, Brookfield	Founded in 1956, church dedicated in 1957
St. John XXIII		1800 N. Wisconsin Street, Port Washington	Founded in 2016 with merger of Immaculate Conception, St. Mary’s, St. Peter of Alcantara Parishes
St. John the Baptist		N9288 Cty W, Johnsburg	Founded in 1841 for German immigrants. Church dedicated in 1902
St. Joseph		S89 W22650 Milwaukee Ave, Big Bend	
St. Joseph		1619 Washington St, Grafton	Founded in 1849, church dedicated in 1897
St. Joseph		1540 Mill St, Lyons	Founded in 1850, church dedicated in 1910. Part of the Burlington-Lyons Catholic Community
St. Joseph		118 W. Main St, Waupun	
St. Katherine Drexel		511 S. Spring St, Beaver Dam	
St. Kilion		264 W. State St, Hartford	Founded in 1863, merged with St. Patrick in 1999
St. Lawrence		4886 Hwy 175, Hartford	Founded in 1846, church dedicated in 1882
St. Leonard		W173 S7743 Westwood Dr, Muskego	Founded in 1957, church dedicated in 1980
St. Louis		13207 County Road G, Caledonia	Founded in 1857, church dedicated in 1901
St. Luke		18000 W. Greenfield Ave, Brookfield	Founded in 1956, church dedicated in 1958
St. Martin of Tours		7963 S. 116th St, Franklin	Founded in 1998 with the merger of Sacred Hearts of Jesus and Mary and Holy Assumption Parishes
St. Mary		9520 W. Forest Home Ave, Hales Corners	Founded in the 1840s, church dedicated in 2003
St. Mary		23209 Church Rd, Kansasville	Part of the Kenosha-Racine Country Line Catholic Parishes
St. Mary		653 Milwaukee St, Lomira	Clustered with Sons of Zebedee Parish
St. Mary		302 S. German St, Mayville	Clustered with St. Andrew and St. Theresa
St. Mary		430 N. Johnson St, Port Washington	Church constructed in 1882; listed on NRHP
St Mary Mother of God		N89 W16297 Cleveland Ave, Menomonee Falls	Founded in 1905, clustered with St. Anthony Parish
St. Mary of the Hill		1515 Carmel Rd, Hubertus	
St. Mary's Visitation		1260 Church St, Elm Grove	Founded in 1848, church dedicated in 1963
St. Matthew		406 E. Main St, Campbellsport	Operates St. Kilian Chapel
St. Matthew		148 W. Lehman St, Neosho	Clustered with Sacred Heart Parish
St. Matthew		9303 S. Chicago Rd, Oak Creek	Founded in 1841, church dedicated in 1962
St. Matthias Mission		1081 County Trunk S, New Fane	Constructed in 1857, operated by a private foundation. Served by Holy Trinity Parish in Kewaskum
St. Michael		8883 Forest View Rd, Kewaskum	Clustered with Holy Trinity Parish
St. Monica		5681 N. Santa Monica Blvd, Whitefish Bay	Founded in 1923, church dedicated in 1955
St. Patrick		1 34 County Hwy, Adell	Founded in 1953, church consecrated in 1877. Gothic Revival-style building constructed with split fieldstone
St. Patrick		107 W. Walworth St, Elkhorn	Founded in 1880, church dedicated in 1905
St. Patrick		1225 W. Main St, Whitewater	Church dedicated in 1958
St. Paul		S38 W31602 Hwy D, Genesee Depot	Found in the 1950s, church dedicated in 2007
St Paul the Apostle		6400 Spring St, Mount Pleasant	Founded in 1965, church dedicated in 2002
St. Peter		1981 Beulah Ave, East Troy	Founded in 1852, church dedicated in 1872
St. Peter		200 E. Washington St, Slinger	Church dedicated in 1892
St. Robert Bellermine		3320 S. Colony Ave, Union Grove	Part of Kenosha-Racine County Line Catholic Parishes
St. Robert of Newminster		2224 E. Capitol Dr, Shorewood	Founded in 1912, church dedicated in 1937
St. Sebastinan		3100 95th St. Sturtevant	
St. Stephen		1441 W. Oakwood Rd, Oak Creek	Founded in 1840s, church dedicated in 2009
St. Teresa of Calcutta		W314 N7462 State Rd 83, Hartland	Founded in 2006 as merger of St. John and St. Clare Parishes
St. Theresa of Avila		136 W. Waukesha Rd, Eagle	
St. Theresa		102 Church St, Theresa	Founded in 1849. Now merged with St. Mary and St. Andrew Parishes
St. Thomas Aquinas		94 N. Lincoln St, Elkhart Lake	Formed in 2001 with the merger of St. Fridolin and St. George Parishes
St. Thomas Aquinas		305 S. First St, Waterford	Founded in the 1840s, church dedicated in 2007

== Shrines ==
Name	Image	Location	Description/Notes
Archdiocesan Marian Shrine		141 N. 68th St, Milwaukee	Dedicated in 1948 as the Milwaukee Fatima Shrine
Holy Hill National Shrine of Mary, Help of Christians		1525 Carmel Rd, Erin	Shrine and Romanesque Revival basilica located on a hill overlooking Milwaukee; listed on NRHP
Sacred Heart Shrine		7335 S. Highway 100, Hales Corner	Dedicated in 1989
Schoenstatt Shrine		W284 N404 Cherry Ln, Waukesha	Dedicated in 1914

== Former parishes ==
Name	Image	Location	Description/Notes
St. Peter		Farmington	Founded in 1855, church consecrated in 1874. Parish discontinued in 1879
St. John the Baptist		N9288 Cty W, Johnsburg	Romanesque church built 1857; listed on NRHP
St. John of God		Kewaskum	Built 1891; former parish; listed on NRHP
St. Mary		Marytown	
St. Peter		St. Peter	
St. Augustine		County Hwy Y, Trenton	Built 1856; former parish; listed on NRHP
