= William George Bruce =

American writer and publisher (1856–1949)

- Born: March 17, 1856; Milwaukee, Wisconsin, U.S.
- Died: August 13, 1949 (aged 93); Milwaukee, Wisconsin, U.S.
- Occupations: Author, publisher, civic leader
- Known for: Founder of the American School Board Journal
- Political party: Democratic
- Awards: Laetare Medal (1947)

William George Bruce (March 17, 1856 – August 13, 1949) was an American author, publisher of educational, historical and religious books, and founder of the American School Board Journal. He was a noted civic leader for the Milwaukee School Board, the Milwaukee harbor, and the Milwaukee Auditorium, and active in Milwaukee and state politics.

== Early life and education ==
William George Bruce was born March 17, 1856, in Milwaukee, Wisconsin, the first of ten children of Augustus F. Bruce and Apollonia Becker. His father was a ship's carpenter, helping build vessels to sail the Great Lakes.

William's early education was at home due to illness, although he attended St. Mary's parish school when he was eleven. His early jobs including cigar making. He attended night school for a time in Milwaukee and also later in Louisville, Kentucky, where he worked in a picture frame factory. On his return to Milwaukee, he studied at the Spencerian Business College.

== Career ==
His career in the publishing field began in 1874 when he was hired as a clerk of the Milwaukee Daily News. Then in 1880 he was hired as a cashier for the Milwaukee Sentinel and also served as assistant business manager. The Sentinel had started in 1837 as a weekly, published by Solomon Juneau, one of Milwaukee's three founders, and became a daily in the 1840s. The paper is now part of the Milwaukee Journal Sentinel.

In 1891, Bruce set out on his own, launching the American School Board Journal. He had discovered a need for practical information for members of school boards while serving on the Milwaukee school board from 1889 to 1894, representing the Fifth Ward. This need led to Bruce's establishment of the Bruce Publishing Company, which published other journals as well as books in education, history, religion and technical topics. In time, Bruce brought his sons, William Conrad Bruce and Frank Milton Bruce, into the publishing company in operational and leadership roles. Nonetheless, he maintained the title of president until his death.

In 1914, the company launched Industrial Arts and Vocational Education, the shop teachers' professional magazine, and three years later began publishing technical books. Both initiatives were spurred by Bruce's conviction that technical training was vital to America's progress.

The publishing firm operated for 77 years until it was purchased in 1968 by Crowell Collier and McMillan. During that time it had published 2,000 books as well as numerous journals, magazines and pamphlets. For many years it had been considered the largest Catholic publishing firm in the world.

== Public service ==
Bruce filled varied leadership roles helping to advance his native city. He is perhaps best remembered for his work and advocacy for the Milwaukee Auditorium and Milwaukee's harbor, both seen as important to the city's life and economy.

While a member of the Milwaukee School Board, he helped advocate for a high school for the city's south side, resulting in the establishment of South Side High School on September 5, 1893. In 1893, Bruce was manager of the city's educational exhibits at the Chicago Columbian Exposition; he also was manager of Wisconsin's educational exhibits at the 1904 St. Louis Exposition, officially the Louisiana Purchase Exposition. He served from 1907–1919 as secretary of the Merchants' and Manufacturers Association in Milwaukee, an organization that advanced trade and business in Milwaukee and promoted the city across the nation.

Construction of the 1909 Milwaukee Auditorium and its operation are closely associated with William George Bruce. He was on the 1905 committee that first began planning a replacement for the city's Exposition Building that had burned down in June of that year. He was president of the Auditorium board in 1911–1912 and still a member of the board on March 17, 1946, when The Milwaukee Journal newspaper did a feature story, "Milwaukee's Grand Old Man," on Bruce's 90th birthday.

On November 22, 1911, he became chair of the new Milwaukee Harbor Commission of nine citizens which was to advise the Milwaukee Common Council. He served in that capacity until 1920 when the city created the five-member Board of Harbor Commissioners. He was elected chairman, a post he held until 1949. William George. Bruce thus led harbor affairs for Milwaukee for a total of 38 years. In addition, he served as a member and at times as president of the Wisconsin Deep Waterways Commission, the Saint Lawrence Tidewater Association, and a number of similar organizations that aimed to connect the Great Lakes to the Atlantic Ocean.

In 1921, Bruce helped found and was elected one of three directors of the original Milwaukee County Historical Society. In 1922, Bruce was one of eighteen members of the Marquette University Board of Regents. From 1930 to 1947, he was a member of the Board of Curators of the Wisconsin Historical Society and served for a time as vice president. He was remembered as a "maker of history" in a eulogy in the Wisconsin Magazine of History at the time of his death. The first eleven chapters of his memoirs were published in the society's magazine during 1932–1934.

== Book author ==
William George Bruce wrote and edited a number of books on the history of Milwaukee, including Milwaukee's Century of Progress (1918), A Short History of Milwaukee (1936) for school children, The Builders of Milwaukee (1946) for the city's centennial, and the three-volume History of Milwaukee, City and County (1922) to which he contributed several chapters for the first volume and edited the entire set including the two volumes of biographies.

He also wrote his memoirs, titled I Was Born in America (1937), with both personal and Milwaukee history depicted. Other works include the School Board Manual; A Reference Work on School Administrative Labors for the Use of School Authorities (1904), School architecture: a handy manual for the use of architects and school (1906), The Story of the Auditorium (1923), The commercial secretary: self-training, functions and relations (1923), and Holy Trinity Church, 1850–1925 (1925).

== Politics ==
Bruce's involvement in the political realm began when he served as chairman of the Democratic city and county committee from 1896–1906. During 1904–1906, he was a Milwaukee tax commissioner. In 1906 he ran for mayor of Milwaukee and in 1925 was a Democratic candidate running to succeed U.S. Senator Robert M. La Follette He lost both elections.

== Recognition ==
Several awards and honors were presented to William George Bruce, recognizing his service to education, to Milwaukee and to the Catholic Church. He received the 1935 Distinguished Service Medal from the Cosmopolitan Club for his untiring service to Milwaukee. The club recognized him as the "dean of civic affairs" and Milwaukee's "public citizen No. 1." Marquette University awarded him its certificate for distinctive civic service. Other recognitions include the naming of the William George Bruce Elementary School on North 89th Street in Milwaukee in his honor and the 1929 renaming of Park Place as West Bruce Street, recognizing his service to Milwaukee's auditorium and harbor.

Recognition for service to the Catholic Church and education include being made a Knight of St. Gregory by Pope Benedict XV in 1920, for contributions to education and charity, and receiving the 1947 University of Notre Dame Laetare Medal for championing the cause of education through his publications.

== Family ==
William George Bruce had three brothers and five sisters, all children of Augustus F. Bruce and Apollonia (Becker) Bruce. They included Albert J. Bruce, Augustus I. Bruce, Emma Bruce, Ida G. Bruce, Clara E. Bruce, Martin P. Bruce, Emily Bruce and Apollonia Bruce.

On May 4, 1881, in Milwaukee, William George Bruce married Monica Moehring, daughter of Conrad Moehring and Renatta (Buehler) Moehring. Their children were William Conrad Bruce (1882–1974), Frank Milton Bruce (1885–1953) and Monica Marie Bruce (1891–1986). Monica Moehring Bruce died January 4, 1938, and William George Bruce died August 13, 1949.

== Legacy ==
The Milwaukee Auditorium building near the corner of 6th and Kilbourn still stands. After extensive renovation in 2001–2003, it was renamed the Milwaukee Theatre and now hosts varied performances including concerts, Broadway musicals, family shows and assemblies. The Milwaukee Harbor Commission continues to supervise the operations of the Port of Milwaukee and harbor development and improvement. The port and harbor are seen today, as in Bruce's time, as important to the economic stability and growth of Milwaukee and Wisconsin.

In his will, William George Bruce left a distinctive legacy to his native city. He made a bequest of $30,000 for creation of a statue honoring immigrant mothers including his own mother, Apollonia Becker Bruce, who was born near Trier, Germany. The noted Croatian sculptor Ivan Meštrović received the commission for the sculpture Immigrant Mother that stands today in Milwaukee's Cathedral Square Park.

His former home is located within the Walker's Point Historic District.
