= Immigrant Mother =

Public artwork by Ivan Meštrović

- Artist: Ivan Meštrović
- Year: 1960
- Type: bronze
- Dimensions: 210 cm × 71 cm × 84 cm (84 in × 28 in × 33 in)
- Location: Cathedral Square Park, Milwaukee; 43°2′30.55″N 87°54′18.816″W

Immigrant Mother is a public artwork by Croatian artist Ivan Meštrović located in Cathedral Square Park in Milwaukee, Wisconsin, United States. The bronze sculpture sits on a red granite base and depicts a mother with her children.

== Description ==
Meštrović's Immigrant Mother is located in Milwaukee's Cathedral Square, opposite the Cathedral of St. John the Evangelist. It stands 7 feet (2.1 m) high on top of a 4 feet 4 inches (1.32 m) tall pedestal. The female figure carries a baby in her arms, while a young child stands beside her. An inscription on the front of the base states: DEDICATED TO THE/ VALIANT IMMIGRANT MOTHERS/ BY WILLIAM GEORGE BRUCE/ IVAN Meštrović SCULPTOR

== Historical information ==
William George Bruce (1856-1949) was the force behind the creation of Immigrant Mother. Bruce was a newspaper business manager in Milwaukee born from German parents. He established the Bruce Publishing Company, and is best known for his efforts in developing and administering the Milwaukee Auditorium. The esteemed businessman was president of the Milwaukee Harbor Commission and instrumental in developing Milwaukee's position as a world port on the Seaway. He even published a three-volume history of the City of Milwaukee. "Due to his distinguished public service career, Bruce gained the sobriquet 'Mr. Milwaukee."

Bruce bequeathed $30,000 to the city of Milwaukee for the creation of a sculpture that symbolized universal motherhood. It was to be dedicated to his mother, Apollonia Becker Bruce, as well as to all immigrant mothers bringing up children in the New World. "Bruce's heirs chose Ivan Meštrović to carry out this commission as Meštrović had immortalized his own mother's image in many of his religious sculptures; Milwaukee's Immigrant Mother may be an example of this homage." Immigrant Mother was placed in Cathedral Square in recognition of Bruce's lifelong devotion to the Roman Catholic Church.

The sculpture demonstrates the dignity of motherhood. It depicts a mother carrying one child, with another child at her side, in a simple figural style. Tool marks are apparent on the sculpture's rough surface.

This piece was dedicated in honor of immigrant mothers on October 1, 1960 by the Modern Art Foundry.

== See also ==
- The Bowman and The Spearman
