= Walker's Point Historic District =

Historic district in Wisconsin, United States

- U.S. National Register of Historic Places
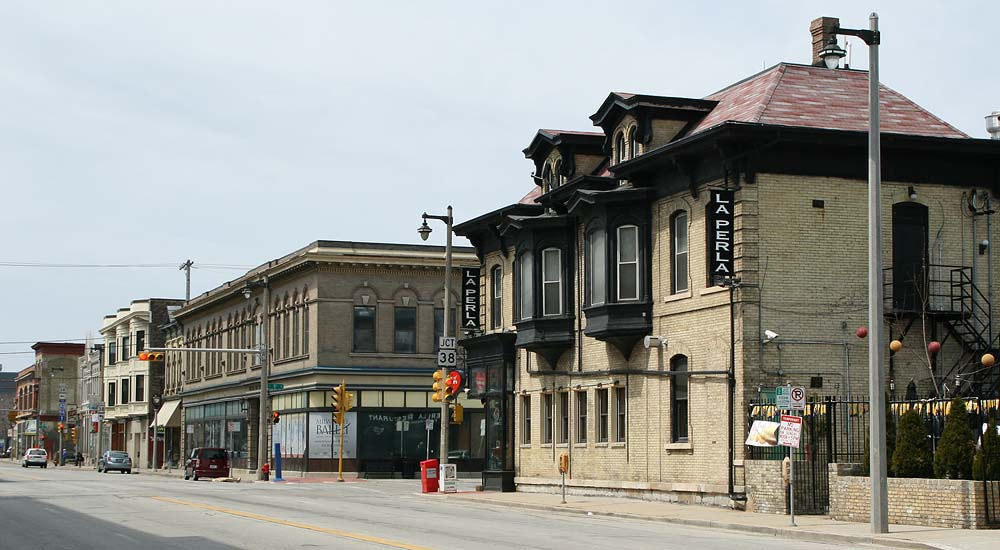
- A portion of the district.
- Location: Roughly bounded by the Freeway, Menomonee Canal, Scott, 2nd, and W. VA. Sts. Milwaukee, Wisconsin
- NRHP reference No.: 78000120
- Added to NRHP: December 19, 1978

The Walker's Point Historic District is a mixed working-class neighborhood of homes, stores, churches and factories in Milwaukee, Wisconsin, with surviving buildings as old as 1849, including remnants of the Philip Best Brewery and the Pfister and Vogel Tannery. In 1978 it was added to the National Register of Historic Places. The NRHP nomination points out that Walker's Point was "the only part of Milwaukee's three original Settlements to reach the last quarter of the Twentieth Century with its Nineteenth and early-Twentieth Century fabric still largely intact," and ventures that "For something similar, one would have to travel to Cleveland or St. Louis if, indeed, so cohesive and broad a grouping of...structures still exists even in those cities."

== History ==
In 1833 George Walker arrived from Illinois to the wild country that would become Milwaukee. In 1834 he staked a claim to 160 acres on the point of land south of the confluence of the Milwaukee and Menomonee Rivers, and built a crude cabin and trading post at what is now the east side of Fourth Street where it meets Bruce. He chose this point on a low ridge because much of the land around was lower and marshy. The ridge itself was covered with hawthorn and hazelnut bushes, and was traversed by two Indian paths heading for the river. A village of Potawatomi lived nearby, near where Sixth Street and National Avenue now meet.

Walker may have been the first settler south of the rivers, but Solomon Juneau had been fur-trading nearby, east of the Milwaukee River, since 1819. By the 1830s the settlement around his trading post was growing into 'Juneautown.' Also in the 1830s, Byron Kilbourn started a competing town on the west side of the Milwaukee River, 'Kilbourntown.' Walker's Point developed more slowly than the other two settlements, not even platted until 1842. Nevertheless, 1,366 people lived there by 1846 when the three settlements were joined into the City of Milwaukee.

By 1855 the Walker's Point contained 3,843 people, with 3,017 of those immigrants. The majority were German immigrants, but also significant numbers of Scandinavians and Irish. These were supplemented by Polish immigrants in the 1870s and 80s.

The first brewery opened in 1841. The large Philip Best Brewing Co. (which became Pabst) opened later, as did the Pfister and Vogel leather tannery. After WWI the industries were "four steamship warehouses, two storage warehouses, three grain elevators, fourteen coal receiving yards, twelve lumber yards, one wool post and wire yard, four tanneries, three salt warehouses, three meat packing plants, and a variety of other minor manufacturing establishments."

The neighborhood that developed over the years is mixed, ranging from workers' cottages to large architect-designed homes, and from craftsman's shops to large factories. Here are some notable surviving buildings:

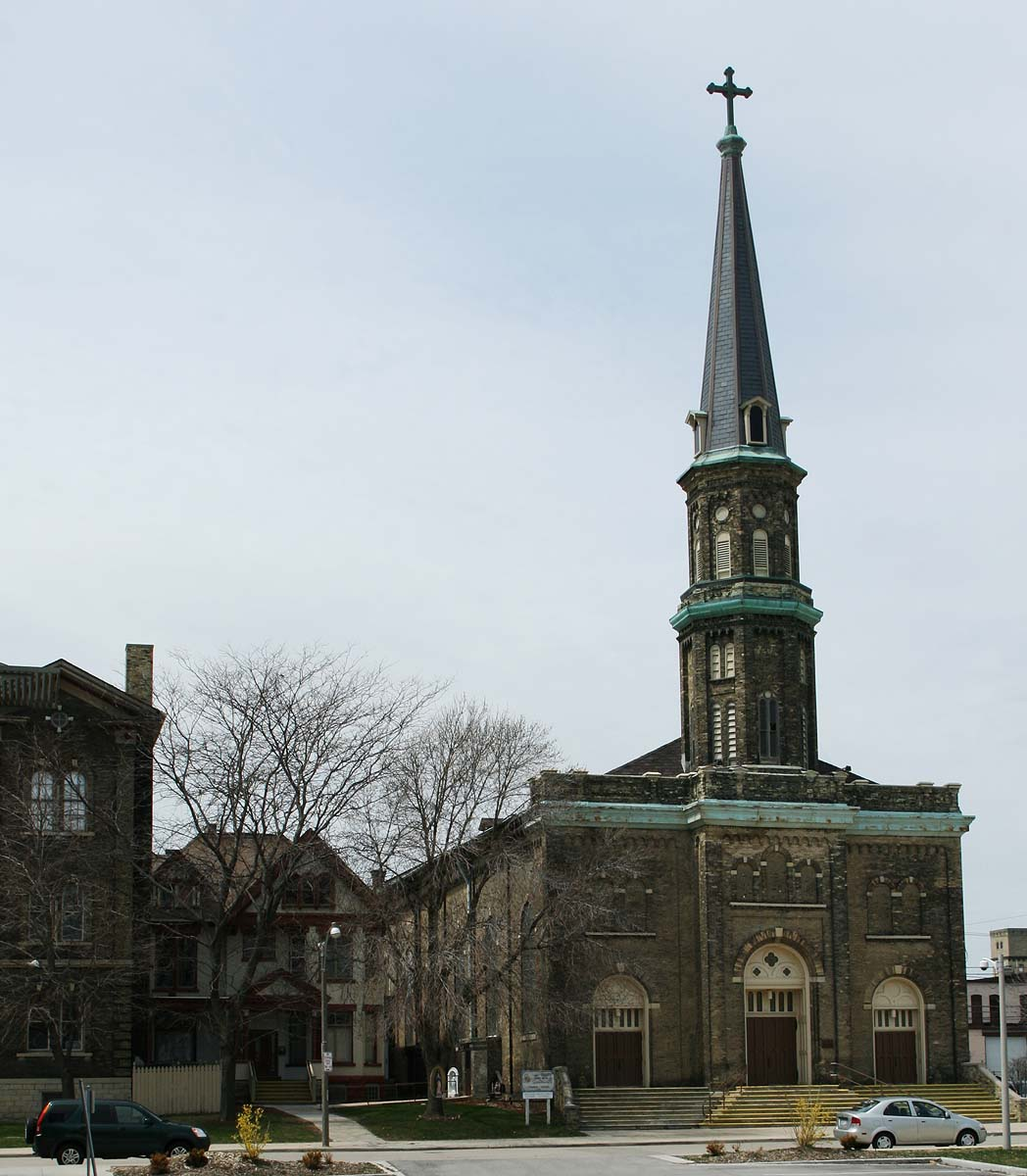
Holy Trinity Catholic Church, 1849, Zopfstil style

- The 1849 Holy Trinity Roman Catholic Church at 605 S. Fourth St. was designed by Victor Schulte in Zopfstil style, a German counterpart of the American Federal style which was familiar to many of the south-German immigrants who formed the early parish. The current tower was added in 1862. The building still looks very much as it did during Civil War.
- The William Howard house at 910 S. Third St. is a 1.5-story frame Greek Revival house built in 1854, with cornice returns and the doorway framed in pilasters and entablature. Howard worked on cargo ships.
- The Vullmahn cobbler shop at 807 S. Second St. is a 2-story wooden Italianate-style structure built in the late 1860s - very unusual. Frederick Vullman bought the lot for $330 in 1863 and made boots and shoes there, living upstairs.
- Holy Trinity School at 621 S Fourth St. is part of the Holy Trinity complex mentioned above - a 3-story Italianate-style structure built in 1867.
- The Jasper Humphrey house at 634 S. Third Street is a 2-story brick house with limestone trim designed by John Rugee and built in 1868. The style is High Victorian Italianate, with the cornice arched above the center window and a cupola rising from the roof above that. Humphrey was a sailor and ship's captain who helped rescue survivors of the Sebastopol wreck in 1855. He was also an alderman and state assemblyman. Starting in 1877 he was Harbor master of the Port of Milwaukee.
- Tannery buildings of the Pfister and Vogel Leather Company remain on W. Oregon St, along the Menomonee Canal. Guido Pfister and Fred Vogel were German immigrants who opened a leather goods store on Milwaukee's east side by 1847 and the following year started building their tannery on the south side. By 1855 nine tanneries were operating in Milwaukee, using hemlock bark from northern Wisconsin and Michigan, oak from Pennsylvania and West Virginia, and gambier from Singapore and India to tan cow-hides from the Midwest into leather. By 1872, Milwaukee was the largest leather-tanning center in the world, and Pfister and Vogel had the largest tannery in Milwaukee. In the currier shop, for example, P&V scoured hides on the first floor, dried them on the second floor, and tanned them in leach tanks on the third to fifth floors. The complex also included a Chrome Department building, a Sole Leather Department building, a Splitting and Shaving building, a Beam House for Harness Leather Finishing, and a Warehouse and Hidehouse. Leather production peaked during WWI and declined soon after, with Pfister and Vogel split and reorganized in 1930.
- Buildings of the Philip Best Brewing Company (later Pabst) remain on W. Virginia St. Best bought the Menomonee Brewery there from Charles Melms in 1869. By 1881 the complex include a bottling plant, three malthouses, a grain elevator, ice houses, a cooper shop, and stables. In 1889 Frederick Pabst took over the company and sold most of these buildings on the south side to Pfister and Vogel.
- Milwaukee Cold Storage Co. Building an 1892 warehouse located at 100 S. 2nd St.
- The Scandinavian Evangelical Lutheran Church at 202 W Scott St. was designed for its Norwegian congregation by Andrew Elleson in the Gothic Revival style that is common for churches and built in 1882. Around 1922 the congregation moved elsewhere, the spire was removed, and the windows replaced. After that the building was reincarnated as a candy factory.
- The Bahr Grocery at 801-805 S. Second St. is a 2-story brick building built in 1887. Frederick M. Bahr was an immigrant from West Prussia who arrived in Milwaukee in 1857. The corner building is Victorian Italianate style, with an elaborate metal cornice and a weather-vane topping the prominent central spire.
- The Fifth Ward School at 823 S. Fourth St is an eclectic 2.5-story building designed by Ferry & Clas and built in 1894. The massing and parapet gable ends suggest Flemish Renaissance Revival, but the NRHP nomination observes, "the details are less easily explained."
- The William George Bruce house at 1137 S. 3rd St. is a 2.5-story house designed by A.C. Seims and built in 1896. The style is eclectic, with the bay and the shingles on the gable ends suggesting Queen Anne, the Palladian windows in the gable ends from Classical Revival, and the stonework on the front perhaps Romanesque. Bruce was the president of Bruce Publishing, author of Milwaukee history books, a prominent Catholic layman, and served on the Milwaukee school board and various commissions.
- The Tivoli Palm Garden at 500 W. National Ave. is a 2-story beer garden/dance hall designed by Charles Kirchhoff and built in 1901 for the Joseph Schlitz Brewing Company. Its Neoclassical styling is still intact on the second story, but the first has been remodeled. Originally the building housed a 34x49 foot beer garden/dance hall at the north end with a 30 foot dome and murals of the tropics, along with a barbershop, a bowling alley, shops and offices.
- St. Stephen's Evangelical Lutheran Church at 1136 S. Fifth St. was designed by Otto Uehling in High Victorian Gothic style and built in 1901. The congregation was organized by German immigrants in 1854 and had a building on this site since 1866. The tower from that 1866 building was incorporated into the 1901 building, clad with brick.

The district was listed on the National Register of Historic Places in 1978 and on the State Register of Historic Places in 1989.
