= Milwaukee Cold Storage Co. Building =

Historic building in Wisconsin, US

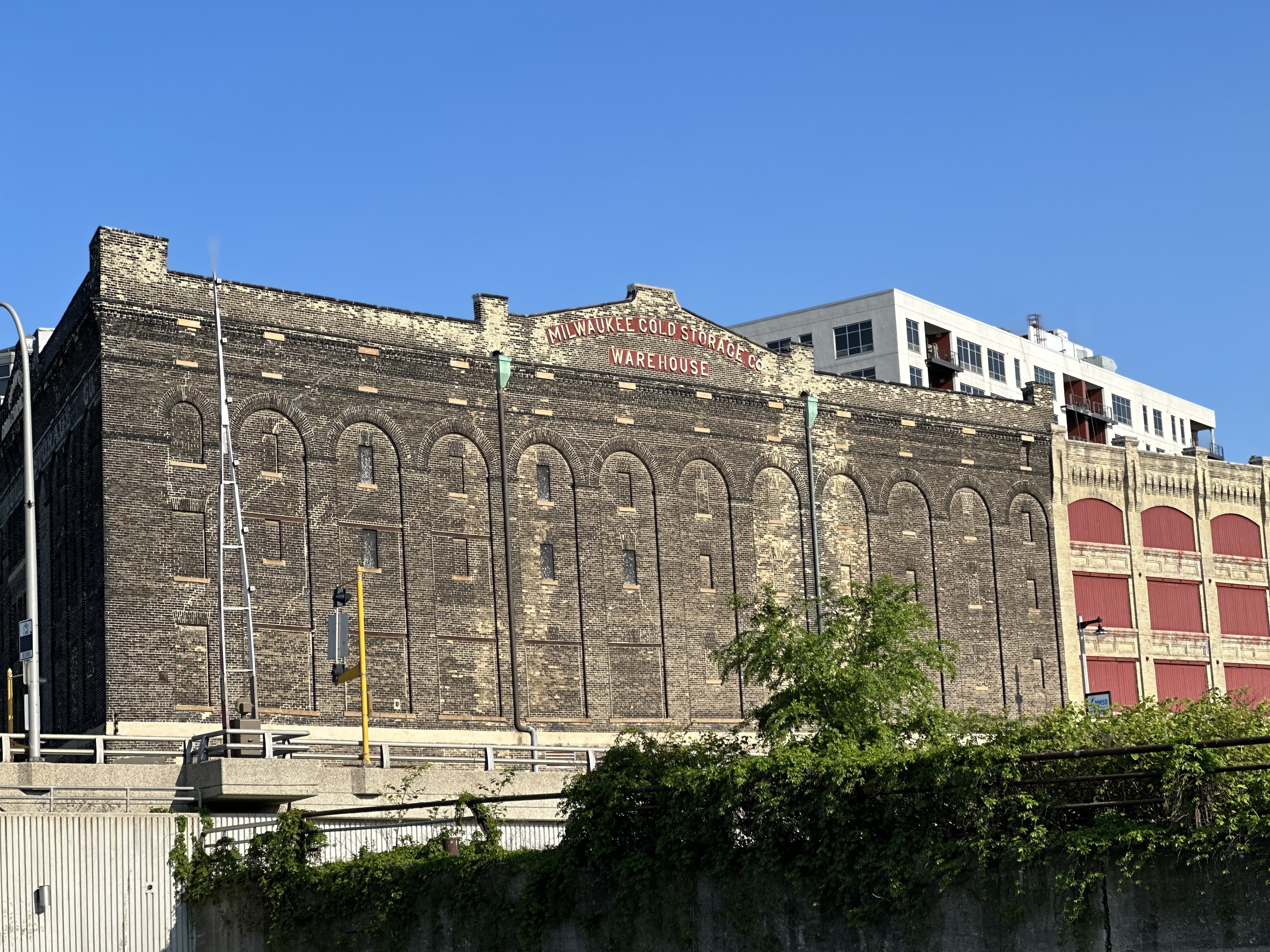
- Milwaukee Cold Storage Co. Building

General information
- Architectural style: Romanesque Revival architecture
- Location: 100 S. 2nd St. Milwaukee, Wisconsin, US
- Coordinates: 43°01′55″N 87°54′44″W
- Completed: 1892
- Cost: $100,000 (equivalent to $3,600,000 in 2025)
- Owner: 1892 - Milwaukee Cold Storage Co.; 2019 - J. Jeffers & Co.

Technical details
- Material: Brick
- Floor count: 5 stories
- Floor area: 71,500 sq ft (6,640 m^{2})

Design and construction
- Architects: Charles D. Crane; Carl C. Barkhausen
- Architecture firm: Crane and Barkhausen

Milwaukee Cold Storage Co. Building is an historic building constructed in the style of Romanesque Revival architecture and located in the Walker's Point Historic District of Milwaukee, Wisconsin, United States. It was built in 1892 and it was once the location for the Milwaukee Cold Storage Company. At the time of construction it was billed as the largest cold storage house in Wisconsin.

To retain the cold air, the five-story building has walls which are two feet thick and there are not many windows. The building was originally cooled with ice that was taken from the nearby river. After 1910 the building was cooled with a mechanical refrigeration system.

In 2019 the building was sold to a Milwaukee developer. The developer plans to restore the building for new uses. The developer has been involved with converting buildings in Milwaukee for use as apartments

== Background ==
The Milwaukee Cold Storage Co. Building was constructed in 1892 as a place to store and distribute "butter, cheese, eggs, fruit, game, poultry" and other items. The building was commissioned by E. R. Godfrey, W. H. Stevens, E. J. Lindsay and William Plankinton. The building is five stories tall and had an available 600,000 cubic feet (17,000 m^{3}) of storage. The building also has a basement. The building was constructed for $100,000 (equivalent to $3,600,000 in 2025) and could store 500 train-car loads (Note: A typical train car in 1904 held 17.7 tons of cargo.) of perishable items at temperatures between 10 and 60 °F (−12 and 16 °C). In 1893 it was called the "largest cold storage house in the State of Wisconsin." The building is situated at the junction of the Menomonee River and Milwaukee River at 100 S. 2nd St.

== History ==
The Milwaukee architects Charles D. Crane and Carl C. Barkhausen were selected to build the structure. The building is in the style of Romanesque Revival architecture and it has 2 ft (0.61 m) walls made of Cream City brick. The building has few windows to minimize the loss of cold air. It is considered to be a historic building and it is located in the Walker's Point Historic District of Milwaukee.

The president of the operation was an inventor named Avelyn I. Dexter. He invented the "Dexter System of Cold Storage" which pushed air over ice to create a refrigeration system. From 1892 to 1910 ice was taken from the Menomonee River to cool the building, but in 1910 the building was cooled with a new refrigeration system which used brine tanks, condensers and ammonia.

On July 30, 1955, there was an ammonia leak on the fifth floor of the building. The Milwaukee Cold Storage Company lost a large quantity of nuts and perishable foods which were stored on the fifth floor as a result of the ammonia fumes. The Milwaukee Cold Storage Company sued the manufacturer of the refrigeration system, the York Corporation. A jury decided that the York Corporation was not at fault for the destruction of the stored items.

The Wisconsin Historical Society surveyed the property in 1984. They have added it to their list in the Wisconsin Architecture and History Inventory. The building had been owned by Brian Jost until 2019. In 2019 the building was sold to J. Jeffers & Co. for US$300,000: it was described as a 71,500 sq ft (6,640 m^{2}) warehouse. The Milwaukee developer said that they plan to restore the building for new uses. J. Jeffers has been converting buildings in Milwaukee for use as apartments.

== See also ==
- Walker's Point Historic District
- Romanesque Revival architecture
- Cream City brick
- Cold storage
- History of Milwaukee
