= Wreckovation =

Disparaging term for post-Vatican II renovation of Catholic cathedrals

Wreckovation is a portmanteau disparagement term used since at least 2002 to describe the style of renovations which some Catholic cathedrals, churches, and oratories have undergone since the Second Vatican Council.

== Background ==
The Second Vatican Ecumenical Council, commonly known as Vatican II, saw the Catholic Church reassess its practices and doctrine in face of the modern world. Convened in 1962 by Pope John XXIII and presided over by Pope Paul VI after John XXIII's death, the council lasted until 1965, the resulting documents of which (Note: Vatican II produced a number of official documents which impacted the Church's practices worldwide. These included four constitutions, nine decrees and three declarations.) addressed, amongst other issues, the way Mass was celebrated and the architecture of churches in which it was celebrated.

To convey the notion of sacrifice, in the Tridentine Mass (the style of Mass used before Vatican II), the altar is a high altar and is prescribed to be (but is not always) ad orientem ('towards the East'), and where the priest always faces East, meaning typically the priest has his back to the people. After the Second Vatican Council, there was a movement to emphasize instead the communal meal aspect of the Mass. This was reflected in church architecture—both new construction and remodels—as replacing the high altar with a table in the middle of the sanctuary, sometimes pejoratively called, by those who oppose these architectural changes, a Cranmer table, named after the Reformationist Thomas Cranmer. This allowed the priest to walk around the table and say the Mass versus populum (facing the people). Other architectural changes would vary, such as removing kneelers, the introduction of in the round seating, lower roofs, removal of statues and sacred art, and relocating the tabernacle from the altar to a side chapel.

Following the Second Vatican Council, in the United States, much architectural change was driven by the 1977 book Environment and Art in Catholic Worship published by NCCB when then-Archbishop Bernardin was president. It extolled the "virtue of simplicity and commonness" and "a simple and attractive beauty", which represented the ideals of modern architecture. It also called for "contemporary art forms", "cloth hangings" and "banners". Although not binding, it was followed by church redesigners such as Richard S. Vosko.

Pope Benedict XVI believed the reforms following the Second Vatican Council went too far, and advocated for what has been called "reform of the reform", as he believed the some had gone astray from the intentions of the council, stating in his 2011 motu proprio Quaerit semper to "focus mainly on giving a fresh impetus to promoting the Sacred Liturgy in the Church, in accordance with the renewal that the Second Vatican Council desired". The following month, he supported Antonio Cañizares Llovera, Prefect of the Congregation for Divine Worship, to establish a "Liturgical Art and Sacred Music Commission", which would be responsible for evaluating both new construction and renovation projects as well as music used during the celebration of Mass to ensure that they complied with church guidelines. Pope Benedict considered the commission's task "very urgent". However, by 2016 (after the 2013 election of Pope Francis), some were still questioning what its responsibilities and authority are, and in his 2017 apostolic letter Magnum principium, Pope Francis removed some of the authority of the CDW over the liturgy.

== Criticism ==
Opposition by conservatives of the architectural changes was in full swing by the 1990s. Conservatives held that such changes were iconoclastic, lacked height, and produced results that resembled Protestant churches, theaters, airport terminals, or barns rather than Catholic churches. A major concern was that the design of renovated churches downplayed the sense of the sacred in favor of focus on the congregation. Critics saw this as inconsistent with the traditional Catholic understanding of communal worship. Meanwhile, more liberal Catholics referred to the renovations as necessary steps in order to emphasize the role of the congregation in worship, in accordance with the wishes of the Second Vatican Council. Conservative Catholics charge that this is a misinterpretation of the documents of Vatican II.

Some churches, such as St. Columban in Chillicothe, Missouri, St. Mark in Peoria, Illinois, and St. Adalbert in South Bend, Indiana are reversing prior renovations and "restoring" the historical Catholic liturgical setup.

== Related renovation controversies ==
- Cathedral of Our Lady of the Angels (Los Angeles) § Criticism
- Cathedral of St. John the Evangelist (Milwaukee) § Renovation and controversy
- Sint-Barbarakerk in Culemborg, Netherlands
