= Jasper Humphrey =

American politician (1812–1892)

Jasper Humphrey (1812-1892) was an American politician. He was a member of the Wisconsin State Assembly.

== Biography ==
Humphrey was born on March 15, 1812, in Steuben County, New York. On February 13, 1835, he married Sarah Bull. By trade, he was a sailor and a sea captain.

On February 2, 1892, Humphrey died in Milwaukee, Wisconsin. He was buried in Richmond, Walworth County, Wisconsin. His former home is located in what is now the Walker's Point Historic District.

== Public career ==
Humphrey was an alderman of Milwaukee in 1854 and 1855. Later, he was a member of the Assembly during the 1857 session. In 1877, he was Harbor Master of the Port of Milwaukee. Humphrey was a Democrat.
