= Richard S. Vosko =

American Roman Catholic priest

The Reverend Richard S. Vosko
- Born: Richard Stephen Vosko; November 16, 1943 (age 82)
- Occupations: Catholic priest & liturgical design consultant

Richard Stephen Vosko (born November 16, 1943) is an American Catholic priest of the Diocese of Albany and liturgical design consultant who has overseen the redesign and renovation of numerous churches and cathedrals in the United States. Vosko has worked throughout the U.S. and Canada as a designer and consultant for worship environments since 1970.

== Career ==
He is the author of God's House Is Our House: Re-imagining the Environment for Worship (Collegeville, MN: The Liturgical Press, 2006) and Designing Worship Spaces: The Mystery of a Common Vision (Meeting House Essay #8; Chicago: Liturgy Training Publications, 1996). Vosko served as the chief liturgist for Bishop Howard Hubbard of the Diocese of Albany.

== Design principles ==
Vosko believes that the role of the church in modern times has changed from the past when churches were designed to house a pre-Vatican II understanding of the liturgy. Vosko's perspective draws heavily from Environment and Art in Catholic Worship (EACW), a 1978 document drawn up by a standing committee of the Bishops Committee of the Liturgy of the United States Conference of Catholic Bishops (USCCB). Although the EACW was never voted on by the full body of bishops and did not carry the force of law, it was used as the standard for new church design and renovation for over 20 years.

EACW’s status has been controversial since its inception not only due to its canonical standing but also its content. EACW uses as a basis the Second Vatican Council’s emphasis on Christ’s presence in the assembly celebrating Mass and – in what some consider a stretch – shifts the basis for the design of the “liturgical environment” to “the action of the assembly” of believers rather than the principles from liturgy, theology, or architecture. The EACW states: "Among the symbols with which liturgy deals, none is more important than this assembly of believers." Vosko states that the "new focus on the assembly" comes from the "recovered role of the people of God during acts of worship and not because of any subversive movement to discount the presence of God in the church." In Vosko's opinion, it is the assembly, not the church building, which must "transcend the ordinary."

In 2000, the EACW was replaced by Built of Living Stones: Art, Architecture, and Worship (BLS). The BLS has been voted on and approved by the USCCB. Vosko has been a critic of this new document.

Vosko church designs and renovations emphasize:

- the Visual – Improved lighting and sound so as to allow all to see and hear the actions of the priest. This often includes moving the organ from the choir to the position directly behind the altar.
- Participation – As every worshiper is called to participate in the Eucharist, the altar is relocated as far forward as possible often to the center of the church so the priest is part of the assembly. This also improves sight lines. Items such as altar rails and pulpits are removed as they inhibit the sense of participation. Worshipers should be arranged around the altar so they can see each other. The baptismal font is generally moved into the assembly and includes full immersion capability.
- the "Horizontal" – Traditional "vertical" churches orient in one direction treating God as transcendent whereas more ascetic "horizontal" churches emphasize God's presence in and with the community.
- Symbolism and Simplicity over Ornamentation – Noble simplicity is better than sumptuous display which only distracts from the actions of the priest during Mass. Elaborate reredos behind the altar, baldachinos, and excessive statuary are generally removed.
- the Imagination – As the community changes, the church needs to adapt to new art, music, language, and ritual practices
- Flexibility – Church pews are often removed and replaced with chairs to allow the church to be used for other functions.
- Other – The tabernacle is typically moved into a separate chapel away from the main church to allow for private eucharistic adoration. Private confessionals are removed and replaced by face-to-face confessional rooms.

== Completed projects ==
Vosko has presided over renovations or contributed to the design of the following cathedrals and churches:

=== Cathedrals ===
- Sacred Heart Cathedral (Rochester)
- Cathedral of St. John the Evangelist (Milwaukee, Wisconsin)
- Cathedral of Our Lady of the Angels in Los Angeles
- St. James Cathedral in Seattle
- Cathedral of San Fernando in San Antonio
- Cathedral of the Incarnation (Nashville)
- Cathedral of the Immaculate Conception (Memphis, Tennessee)

=== Churches ===
- St. Joe's Catholic Church (De Pere, Wisconsin)
- St. Vincent de Paul Church, Albany, New York
- St. Cecilia's Catholic Church (Warrensburg, New York)

== Criticism ==
Some have branded Vosko's church renovations as "wreckovations" due to his large-scale removal of sacred art and ornamentation in an attempt to achieve a non-traditional realignment of essential church elements. Architect Michael Rose accused Vosko of being a "liturgy deconstructionist".
