= Erhardt Stoettner =

American stained glass artist (1899–1992)

Erhardt Stoettner (25 September 1899 – 6 January 1992) was a master craftsman and designer of stained glass windows for the T. C. Esser Studios in Milwaukee, Wisconsin.

Among the churches with windows designed by Stoettner are:

- 1939: Mount St. Scholastica Chapel, Atchison, Kansas
- 1942–1948: Grace Lutheran Church, River Forest, Illinois
- 1951: Peace Lutheran Church, Oshkosh, Wisconsin
- 1953: St. Bernard Church, Wabash, Indiana
- 1953: Zion Lutheran Church, Wausau, Wisconsin, listed on NRHP
- 1954: St. Anthony's Memorial Hospital, Effingham, Illinois (see history brochure, pp. 24–31)
- 1957: St. Peter in Chains Cathedral, Cincinnati, Ohio
- 1964: Norway Lutheran Church, Wind Lake, Wisconsin (see history article pdf, page 108)
- 1969: Grace Lutheran Church, South Range, Michigan
- Cathedral of St. John the Evangelist, Milwaukee, Wisconsin
- Lake Park Lutheran Church, Milwaukee, Wisconsin
- St. Helen Church, Chicago, Illinois
- St. Mark's Episcopal Church, Grand Rapids, Michigan

In the design and execution of these windows, three noted artists are deserving of recognition. Erhard Stoettner, German craftsman who, among other important works, helped in the restoration of the windows of the Cathedral of Notre Dame at Rheims, was the research artist who selected the colors and regulated other technical details. The design of both windows and figures is the work of Gerard Recke, an American artist, who designed the windows in the chapel of Princeton University. Joseph Freney of Dublin, Ireland, was the artist who painted the faces and figures in the windows.

An archived letter to Stoettner about the price of a window. NOTE: Gerard Recke is also known as Gustave Recke.
