= Lake Express =

Ferry company across Lake Michigan

Lake Express High-Speed Ferry
- Industry: Travel
- Founded: 2004; 22 years ago
- Founder: Ken Szallai, former President
- Headquarters: Milwaukee, United States
- Area served: Lake Michigan
- Key people: Ryan Griebel, President
- Services: Passenger transportation, vehicle transportation
- Website: www.lake-express.com

Lake Express High-Speed Ferry is an American company that operates a seasonal ferry service across Lake Michigan between Milwaukee, Wisconsin and Muskegon, Michigan, operating a similarly-named ship, the HSC Lake Express. The Lake Express Milwaukee terminal and the company headquarters are located near the Port of Milwaukee. Their ferry travels a distance of about 80 miles (70 nmi; 130 km), in two-and-a-half hours, across Lake Michigan.

== History ==
Lake Express commenced operations on June 1, 2004. The service was the first regular ferry operation to connect Milwaukee and Muskegon since Milwaukee Clipper service had been discontinued in 1970.

In 2020, the Milwaukee ferry terminal was designated the eastern end of the Wisconsin portion of U.S. Bicycle Route 30.

== Fleet ==
Lake Express operates one vessel with a capacity of 250 passengers, 46 vehicles, and 12 motorcycles.

Name	Built	Entered service	Tonnage
Lake Express	2004	2004	3,000 GT

== Gallery ==
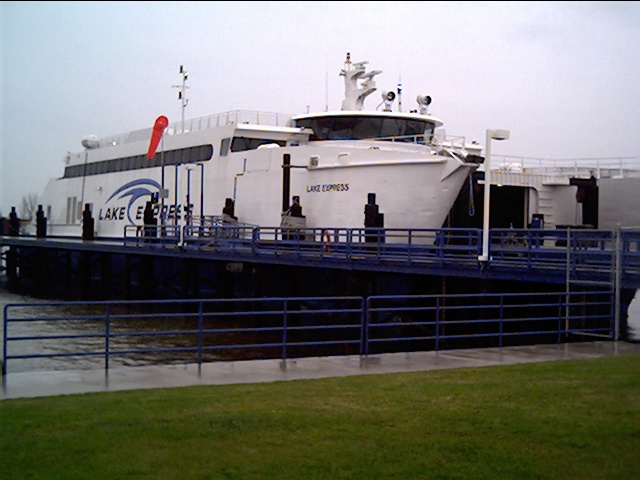
Lake Express at Muskegon

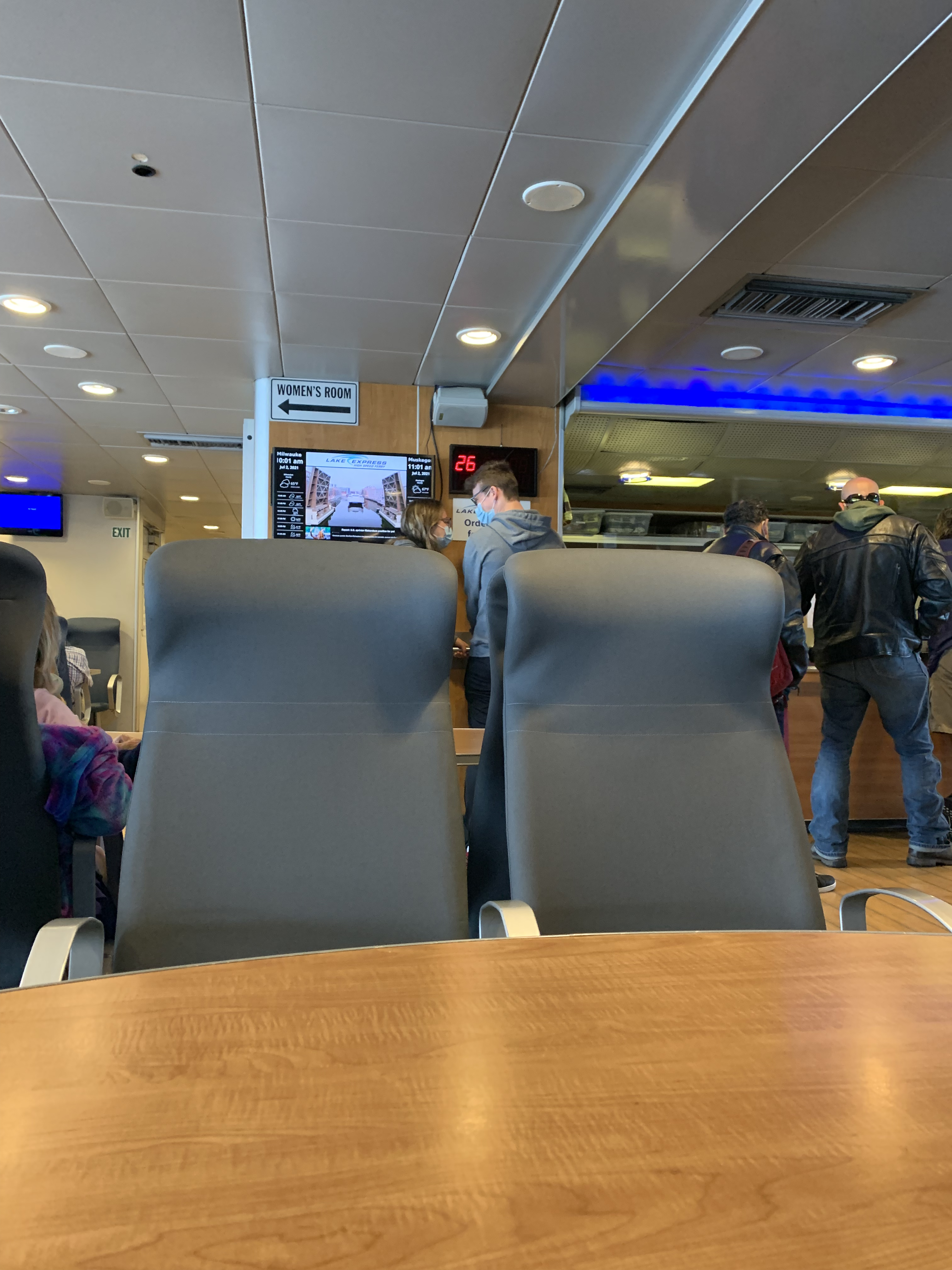
Onboard the Lake Express

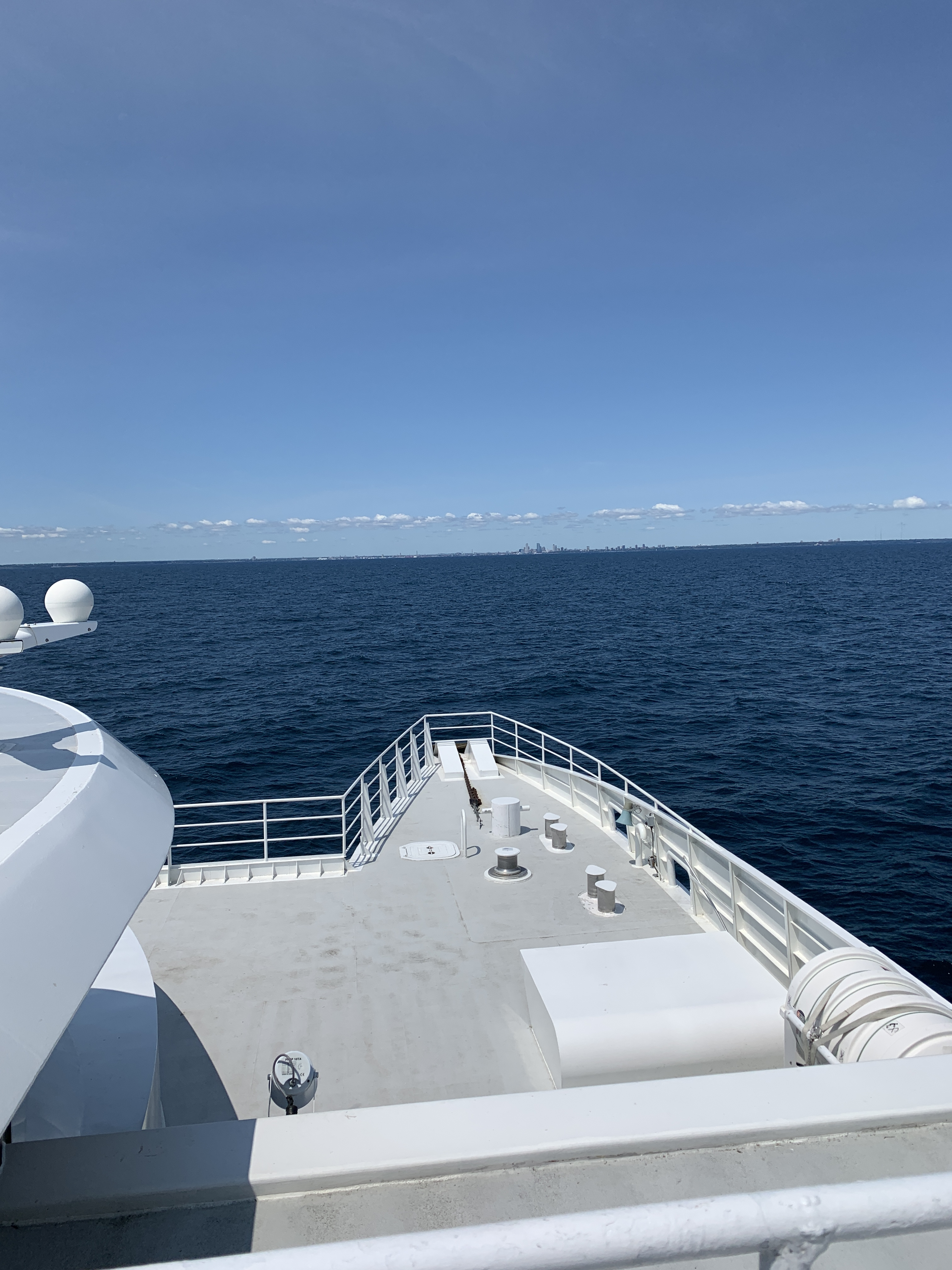
Approaching Milwaukee on the Lake Express

== See also ==
- Port of Milwaukee
- Port of Muskegon
