= Old St. Mary's Church (Milwaukee, Wisconsin) =

Historic church in Wisconsin, United States

- U.S. National Register of Historic Places
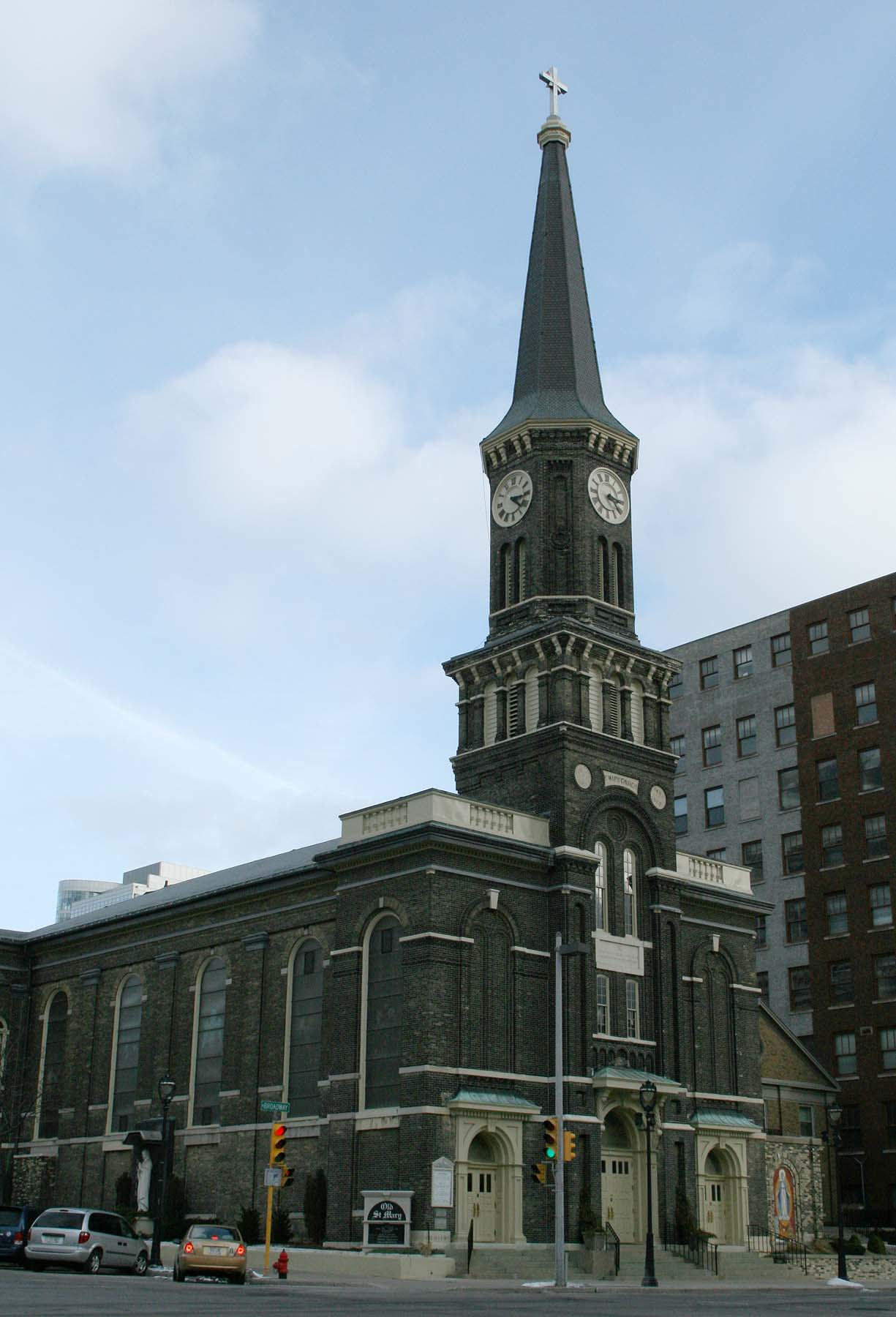
- Old St. Mary's Church

- Location within Wisconsin Location within the United States
- Location: 844 N. Broadway, Milwaukee, Wisconsin
- Coordinates: 43°2′29″N 87°54′28″W
- Area: less than one acre
- Built: 1846–47, 1866–67
- Architect: Victor Schulte
- Architectural style: Greek-Ionic / Zopfstil
- NRHP reference No.: 73000253
- Added to NRHP: March 7, 1973

Old St. Mary's Church is a Catholic parish in Milwaukee, Wisconsin, built in 1846 and 1847. It is the oldest church still standing in the city.

== History ==
The parish was founded a year earlier by German Catholic immigrants. It was the first German church in the Archdiocese of Milwaukee. The city had been incorporated only the year before, and Wisconsin had not yet become a state. Old St. Mary's is the oldest church still standing in the city. The building was listed on the National Register of Historic Places on March 1 1973.

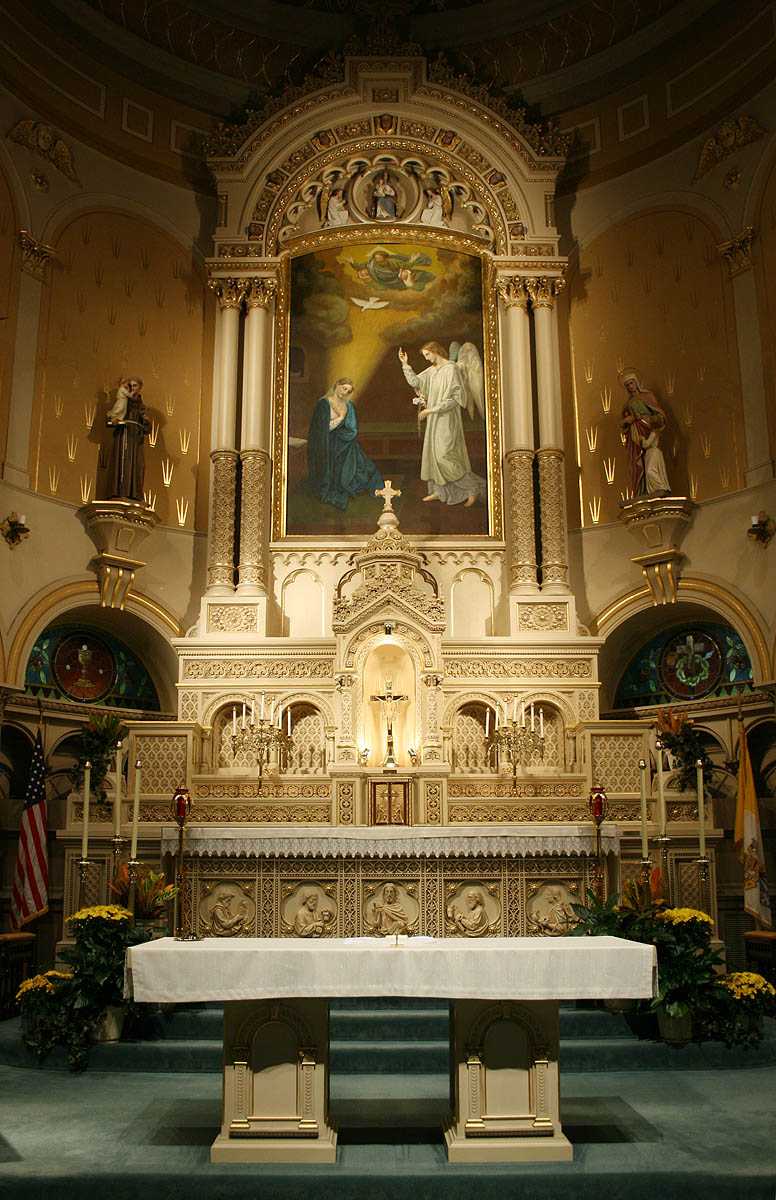
The 1848 high altar

The church was designed by Victor Schulte, a Prussian immigrant from Westphalia. Schulte designed the church in Zopfstil style, a German counterpart of the American Federal style, which was probably familiar to German immigrants in the parish. Hallmarks of the style are the low-pitched roof, the round-topped windows, and a neat simplicity that contrasted with Baroque and Rococo styles. Schulte also designed Milwaukee's St. John Cathedral (built 1847-53) and the 1850 Holy Trinity Catholic Church in the same style. The cornerstone was laid on April 19, 1846. The building is constructed of cream city brick. The carved wooden high altar was purchased in 1848. A painting of the Annunciation behind the altar by Franz Xavier Glink was donated by King Ludwig I of Bavaria.

The church's tower gained a clock in 1860 and three bells in 1868. These bronze bells were cast in Munich. St. Mary's was modified fairly extensively from 1866 to 1867, again under direction of Victor Schulte. Before that, what is now the main worship space was split into two floors: a short first story which housed the parish school's classrooms, and a taller main level where Mass was conducted. In 1866 the parish built a separate school building and eliminated the lower classroom level of the church building, lowering the floor of the main worship space. The east end was extended and the west facade was reworked, with a new spire added in 1866. The church bells were hung in 1868.

The interior was redecorated after a fire in 1893, but the exterior still stands very much as it did right after the 1867 remodeling, two years after the Civil War.

With the arrival of a number of Cuban emigres to the parish, a statue of the Cuban Madonna, Our Lady of Charity, was installed in the church.
