= HSC Lake Express =

American ferry on Lake Michigan

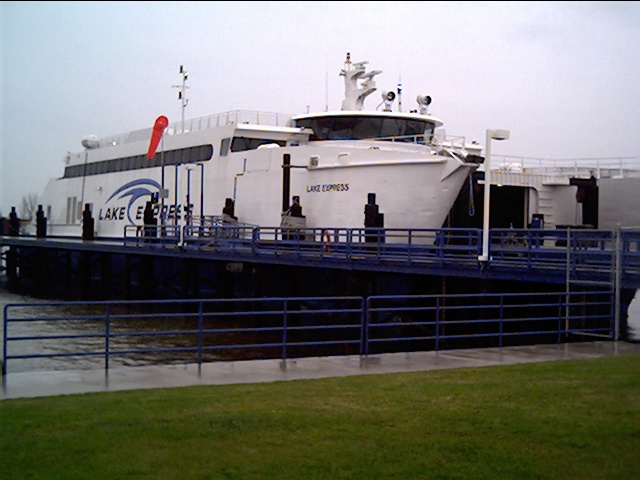
- Lake Express at Muskegon

History
- Name: 2004 onwards: Lake Express
- Operator: Lake Express
- Port of registry: Milwaukee (United States)
- Route: Milwaukee - Muskegon
- Builder: Austal USA, Mobile
- Yard number: US 614
- Identification: IMO number: 9329253
- Status: In service

General characteristics
- Tonnage: 1,757 GT
- Length: 191 ft 7 in (58.40 m)
- Beam: 57 ft 9 in (17.60 m)
- Draught: 8 ft 2 in (2.50 m)
- Installed power: 4 × MTU 16V 4000 M70 diesel engines
- Propulsion: 4 × Kamewa waterjets
- Speed: 34 kn (39 mph; 63 km/h)
- Capacity: 248 passengers; 44 cars & 12 motorcycles

Lake Express is a high-speed auto and passenger ferry that operates across Lake Michigan linking the cities of Milwaukee, and Muskegon from late spring to the fall of each year.

== Background ==
The ship travels at a top speed of 34 knots (39 mph; 63 km/h) and makes the 68-nautical-mile (78 mi; 126 km) trip three times daily from each side of the lake during the peak of its operational schedule. Lake Express is able to cross the lake in two and a half hours. It was constructed by Austal USA in Mobile, Alabama entering service on June 1, 2004.

It was one of the first high-speed catamaran-style auto/passenger ferries built in the United States. It was the first high-speed auto ferry to see service on the Great Lakes, beating the Spirit of Ontario I, which was beset by a series of last-minute delays, by one month.

On August 21, 2005, the ferry rescued a man whose boat had capsized in the middle of Lake Michigan.
