= St. Patrick's Roman Catholic Church (Adell, Wisconsin) =

Historic church in Wisconsin, United States

- U.S. National Register of Historic Places
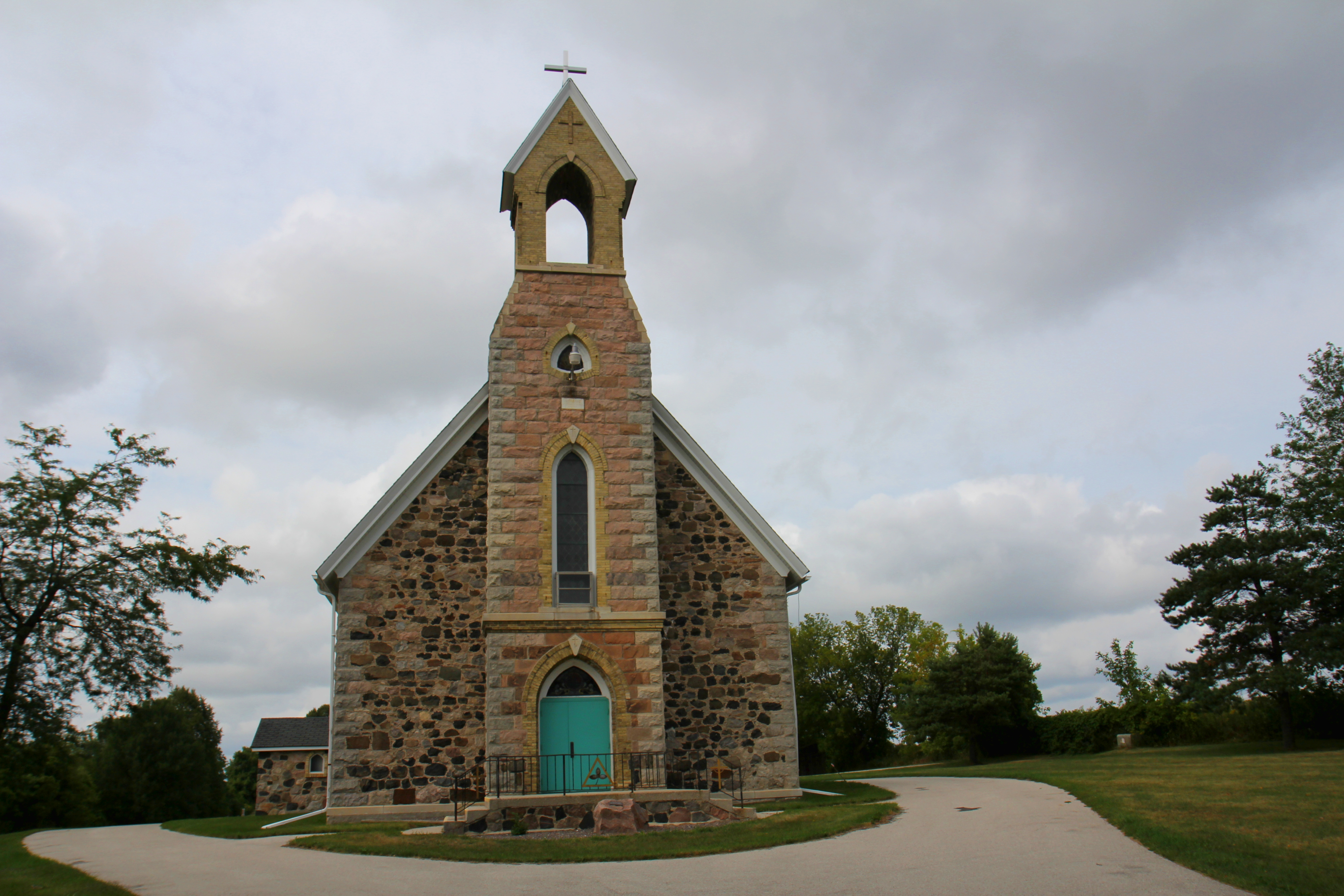
- St. Patrick's Roman Catholic Church
- Location: County A Adell, Wisconsin
- Coordinates: 43°37′0″N 87°55′49″W
- Built: 1877
- Architectural style: Gothic Revival
- NRHP reference No.: 83003428
- Added to NRHP: September 8, 1983

St. Patrick's Roman Catholic Church is located in Adell, Wisconsin, a Gothic Revival-styled church with exterior of split fieldstone, built in 1877 to serve the surrounding Irish-immigrant community. It was added to the National Register of Historic Places in 1983 for its architectural significance.

== Images ==
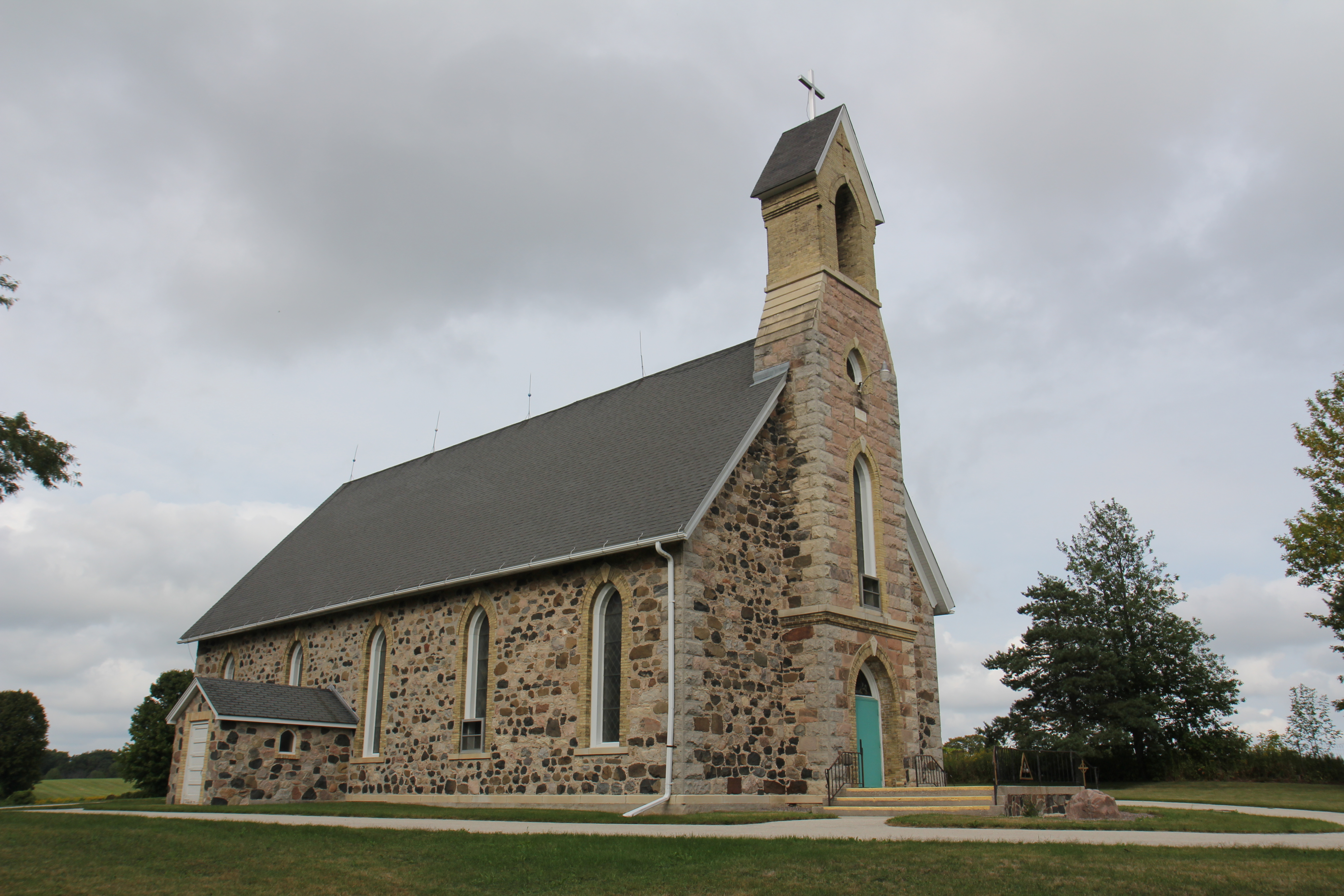
Side

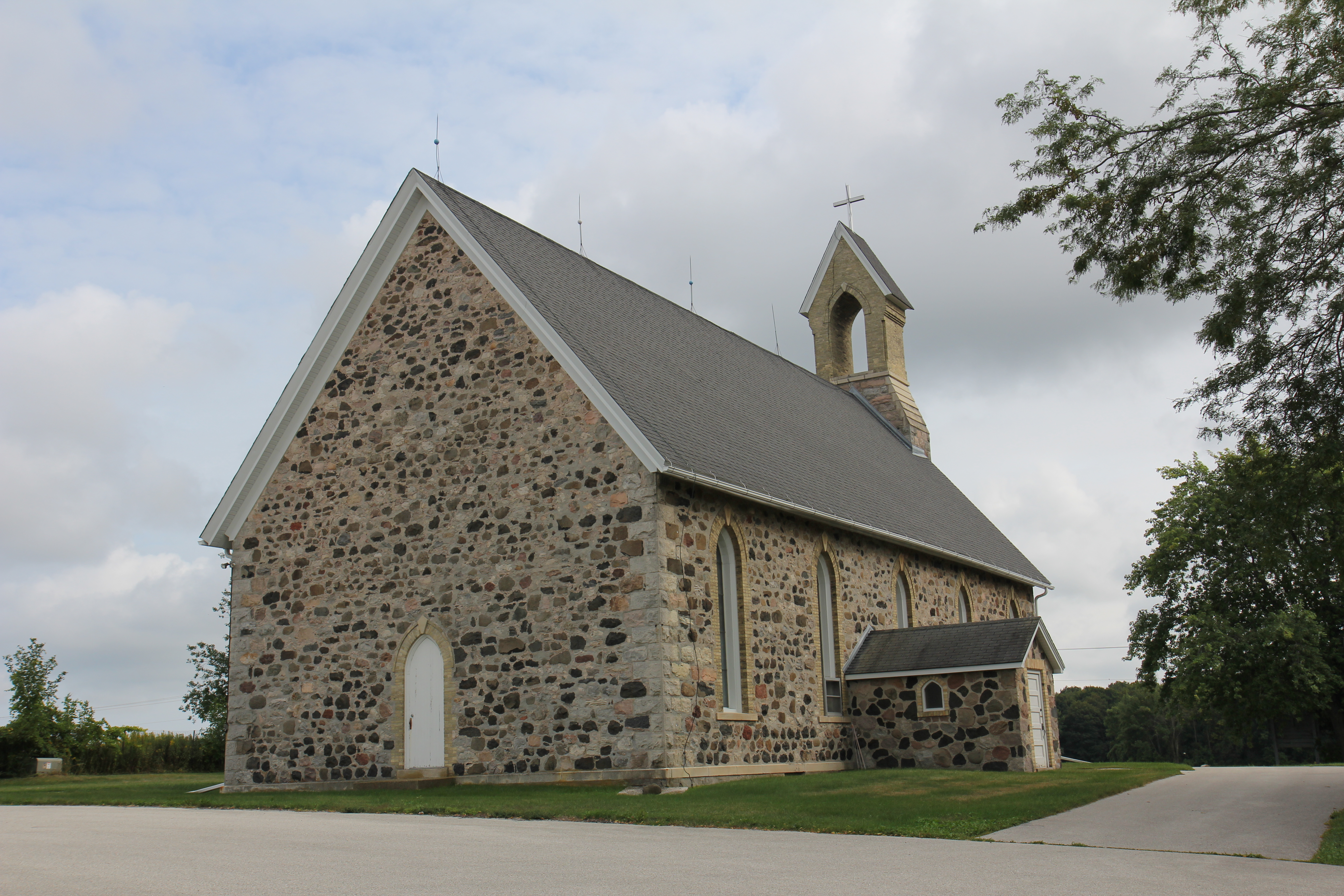
Rear
