= St. Vincent de Paul Church (Milwaukee) =

Church building in Milwaukee, United States of America

Coordinates: 43°00′45.7″N 87°56′23.1″W

The St. Vincent de Paul Church, referred to in Polish as Świętego Wincentego a Paulo, is a parish of the Roman Catholic Church in Milwaukee, Wisconsin, in the Archdiocese of Milwaukee. Its parish church, located at 2114 W. Mitchell St. on Milwaukee's South Side, is one of Milwaukee's "Polish Cathedrals".

== History ==
In the mid-1880s, it was decided to organize a fourth Polish parish on Milwaukee's south side. $30,000 was raised and a large two-story brick building constructed, designed by Bernard Kopacki. In 1888 the church was completed and dedicated by Archbishop Michael Heiss to St. Vincent de Paul.

The first priest to serve the parish was Father Vincent Lewandowski, who had been ordained into the priesthood in the Duchy of Poznań in 1864. A Polish nationalist, Father Lewandowski was forced to flee in 1872 and arrived in America three years later.

A smallpox epidemic broke out in 1894 and took the lives of nine parish schoolchildren. A somewhat cross and irritable man, Father Lewandowski resigned from the parish in a fit of anger in 1899, and died of a heart attack the following year while riding in a streetcar.

Around this time, a new church was required to cope with the number of parishioners each Sunday. $85,000 was raised and the new "cathedral" was built in the Romanesque Revival style. It measured 66 feet wide by 186 feet (0.06 km) long. The twin towers rise 132 feet and 195 feet respectively, it has four bells, the largest of which is 62" in diameter and weights 5000 lbs.

Two U.S. Congressman called St. Vincent de Paul their home parish. John C. Kleczka, who was the first Polish-American elected to Congress, and later Clement J. Zablocki, who served Wisconsin's fourth district for 35 consecutive years. Congressman Zablocki also served as the parish organist and sang in the church choir.

The parish provided a grade school. Attached below is a photo of the graduating 8th grade class (ca. 1912), including Frank E. Gregorski, Judge, District Court, Milwaukee County, Wisconsin, 1953–1960.

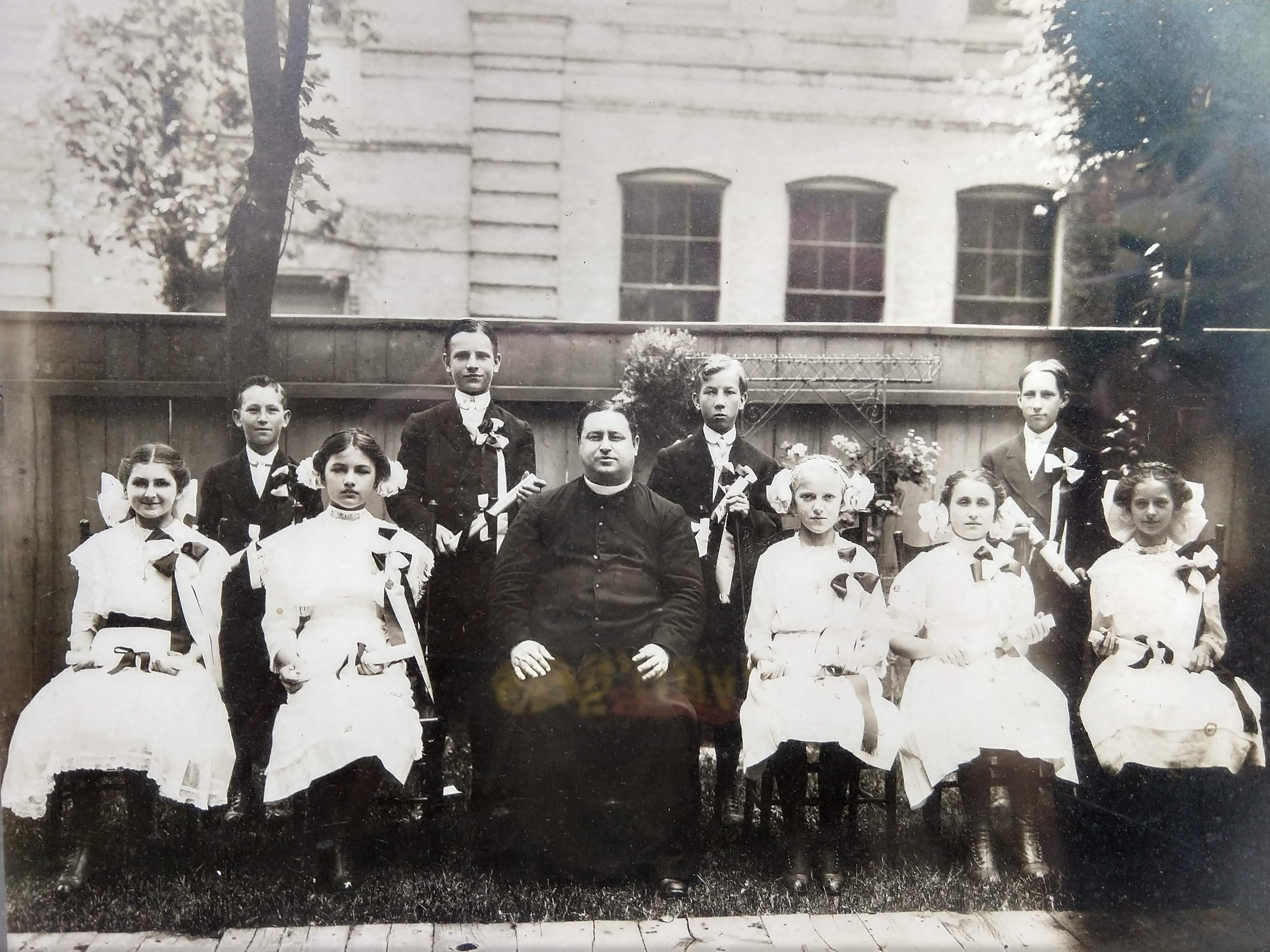
St Vincent's 8th Grade Graduation, ca. 1912

== Bibliography ==
- Borun, Thaddeus We, The Milwaukee Poles (Milwaukee: Nowiny Publishing Co. 1946)
- St. Vincent de Paul Jubilee Book, 1938
- St. Vincent de Paul Jubilee Book, 1963
