= Holy Trinity Roman Catholic Church (Milwaukee, Wisconsin) =

Historic church in Wisconsin, United States

- U.S. National Register of Historic Places
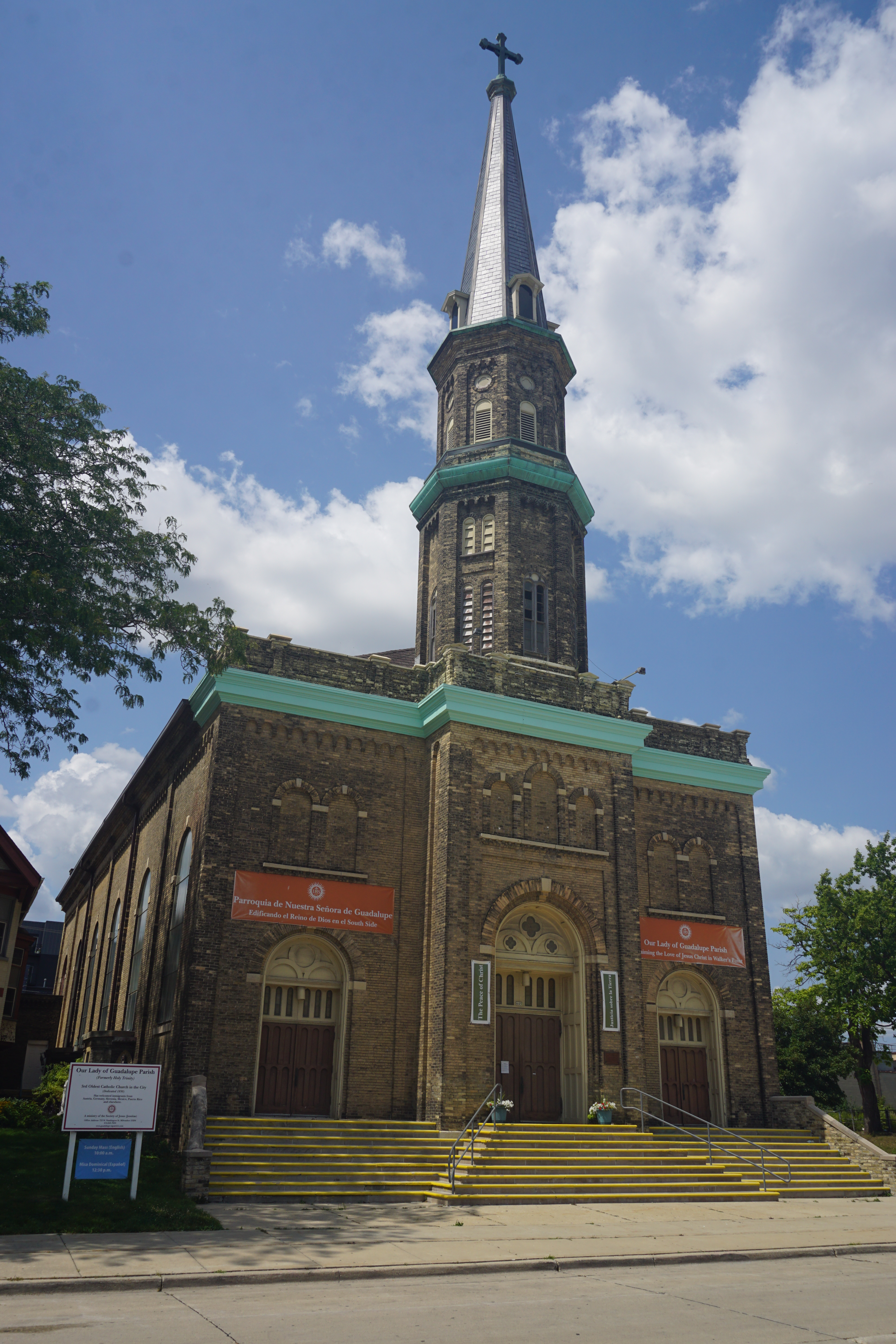
- Holy Trinity Roman Catholic Church
- Location: 605 S. 4th St. Milwaukee, Wisconsin
- Coordinates: 43.02509°N 87.91579°W
- NRHP reference No.: 72000062
- Added to NRHP: November 7, 1972

The Holy Trinity Roman Catholic Church is a historic church built in 1850 in Milwaukee, Wisconsin - now one of oldest surviving church buildings in the city, and very intact. In 1972, it was added to the National Register of Historic Places.

== History ==
The Walker's Point settlement was founded in the 1830s. Many of the early settlers were German-speaking Catholics - many with roots in southern Germany and Austria. In the late 1840s, Father Salzmann of St. Mary's Church began organizing those German-speaking Catholics of the south side into Holy Trinity parish.

German-born architect Victor Schulte designed the main block of Holy Trinity (as he had St. Mary's) rectangular with brick walls which have weathered to a warm gray. Bays are framed in pilasters, with a large round-topped window in the center of each. The roof is low-pitched, largely hidden behind a brick parapet. The style is influenced by Zopfstil, a German counterpart of the American Federal style. Initially, it did not have a steeple. Inside the three front entries lead to a shallow vestibule. Beyond that, the nave has pews along a central aisle leading to a semicircular chancel. The church was dedicated by John Henni, the first Archbishop of the Roman Catholic Archdiocese of Milwaukee, on September 22, 1850.

The steeple was added in 1862, designed by German-trained Leonard A. Schmidtner, consisting of an octagonal tower rising behind the front entrance of the church, leading to a smaller octagon at the next stage, leading to a tall spire with four windows, topped with a cross high above. The interior was renovated in 1863. The clock was installed in the tower in 1869. The interior was renovated more in 1874, and the pipe organ was installed in 1878. The wooden altarpieces were added in 1890, built by Aegidius Hackner of La Crosse.

Over the years the Germans have waned in the surrounding neighborhood, and Puerto Ricans and Mexican-Americans have increased. In the 1960s Holy Trinity's parish merged with Our Lady of Guadalupe Church. Nevertheless, the church building itself stands much as it did in the 1800s - a key building in the Walker's Point Historic District.
