= Cathedral Square Park =

Milwaukee County Park

Coordinates: 43.0419°N 87.905°W

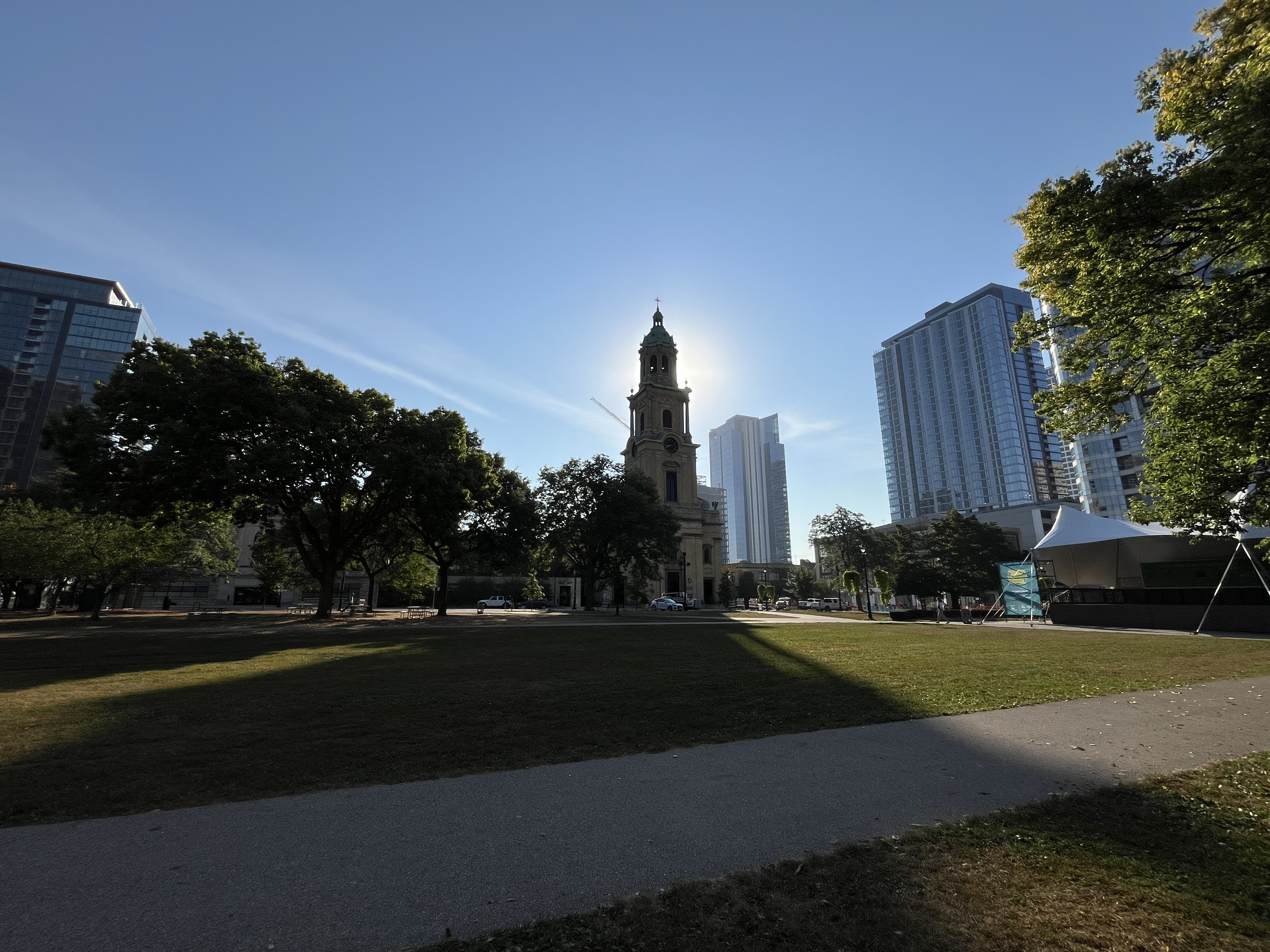
Cathedral Square Park

Cathedral Square Park is a small urban Milwaukee County Park in Milwaukee, Wisconsin, US, located to the west of the Cathedral of St. John the Evangelist. The park only takes the name of the nearby cathedral, with the Archdiocese of Milwaukee holding no ownership of the site.

== History ==
Originally known as Courthouse Square, the land was donated by city co-founder Solomon Juneau in 1836, and housed a court house and jail. The first courthouse was built by Solomon Juneau and Morgan L. Martin. A mob of 5,000 people converged at the jail in 1854 to rescue Joshua Glover, a runaway slave captured and imprisoned by federal marshals. During the American Civil War, parkland south of the courthouse was used as place to assemble for troops leaving for or returning from the front.

A second courthouse was built on the site in 1873, and was used until 1931 when the current Milwaukee County Courthouse was built. The jail was moved to another site in 1886.

== Current park ==
The area became a park in 1939 after the second courthouse was razed. Since then, it has become a popular meeting place and host for events such as Jazz in the Park and the farmers' market, and as the site of the city's official Christmas tree. The city currently offers free Wi-Fi service in the park, while WISN-TV has a permanent weather observation camera overlooking the square as part of their local camera network. As of November 2, 2018, the Hop streetcar stops near the park.

| Preceding station | The Hop | Following station |
|---|---|---|
| City Hall toward Intermodal Station | M-Line | Jackson at Juneau toward Burns Commons |

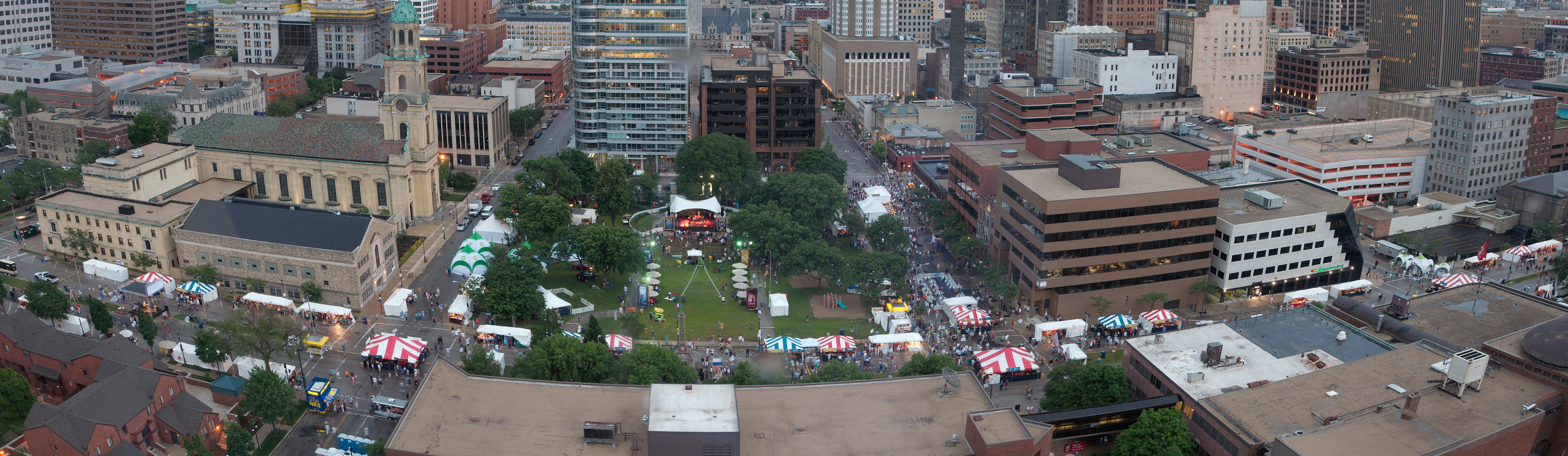
East Town neighborhood during Bastille Days in July 2008, facing south toward downtown Milwaukee. Cathedral of St. John the Evangelist on the left and Cathedral Square Park to the right.

== See also ==
- Immigrant Mother
