= Cold storage =

Cold storage may refer to:

== Arts and entertainment ==
- CoLD SToRAGE, an alias of the musician Tim Wright (born 1967)
- Cold Storage (1951 film), an animated short starring Disney's Pluto
- The Walking Dead: Cold Storage, a 2012 four-part webisode series for The Walking Dead TV series
- Cold Storage (novel), a 2019 science fiction novel by David Koepp
- Cold Storage (film), a 2026 film adaptation of Koepp's novel

== Temperature ==
- Cold chain
- Cool store
- Cool warehouse
- Freezer
- Refrigeration
- Refrigerator
- ULT freezer (ultra low temperature, −40 to −86 °C)

== Other uses ==
- Cold storage, an offline cryptocurrency wallet
- Cold Storage Limited, original name of Frasers Property
- Cold Storage (supermarket), a supermarket found in Singapore and Malaysia

== See also ==
- Cold data, electronic data that is infrequently accessed
- Cryobiology, the study of the effects of low temperatures on living things
