= Port of Milwaukee =

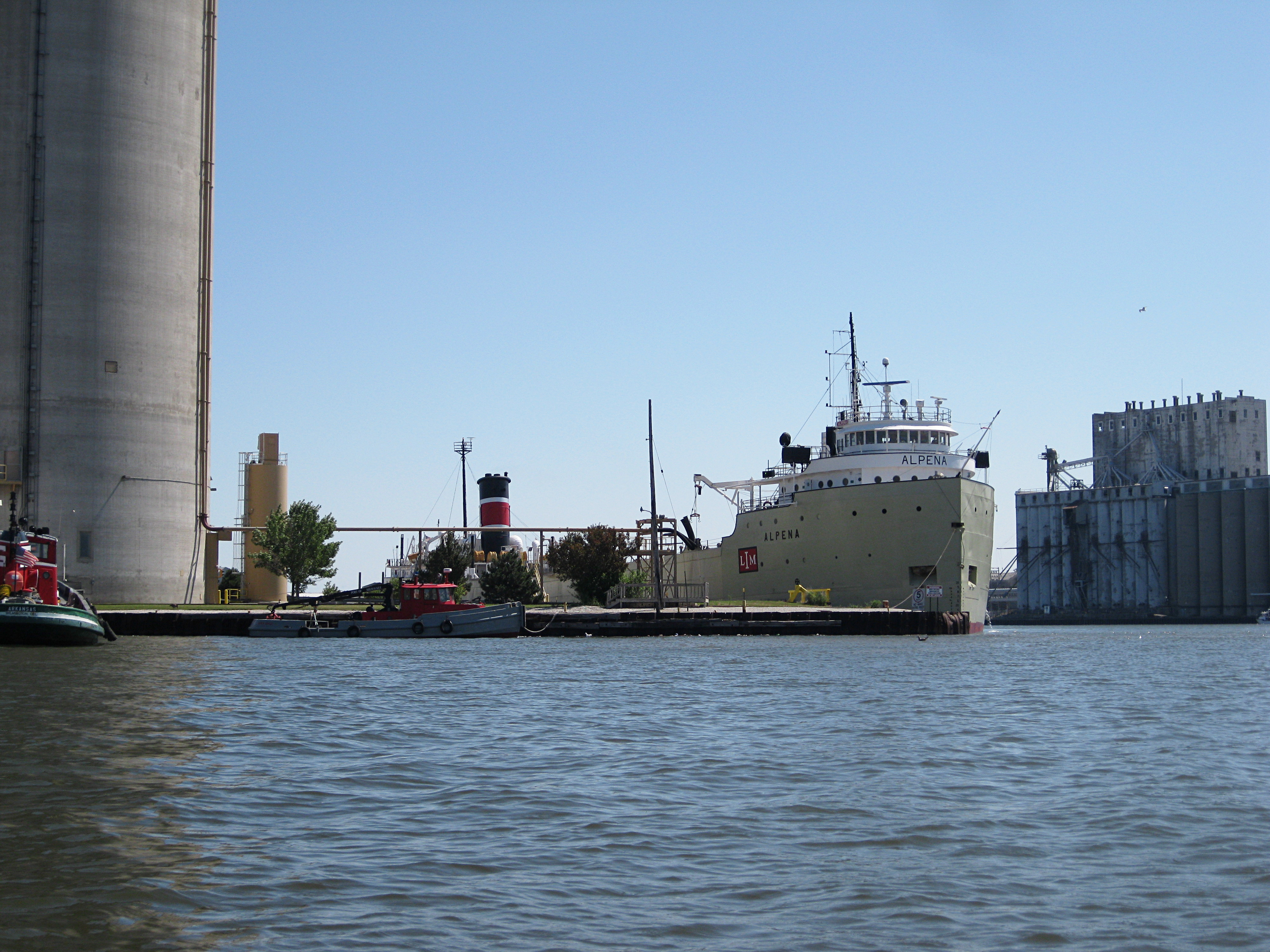
- Bulk carrier Alpena with tugboats, 2011

Location
- Country: United States
- Location: Milwaukee, Wisconsin
- Coordinates: 43°00′10″N 87°53′28″W

Details
- Opened: 1835
- Owned by: City of Milwaukee
- Size: 467 acres (189 hectares)
- No. of berths: 16
- Port Director: Jackie Q. Carter
- Foreign Trade Zone: No. 41
- Class 1 Railroad Access: Union Pacific Railway and Canadian Pacific Railway

Statistics
- Annual cargo tonnage: 2,272,972 metric tons (2022)
- Annual revenue: $5.4 million (2022)
- Net income: $1.1 million (2022)
- Website https://portmilwaukee.com/port

The Port of Milwaukee, branded as Port Milwaukee, is a port in the city of Milwaukee on Lake Michigan. It primarily serves Southeastern Wisconsin, Southeastern Minnesota, and Northern Illinois. The port owns 13.5 miles (21.7 km) of rail that connect to two Class I railroads outside the port. The port has over 330,000 square feet (31,000 m^{2}) of covered warehouse space, with 30,000 square feet (2,800 m^{2}) of that being heated warehouse space. The port has 50 acres (20 ha) dedicated to dry bulk storage, which includes four domes capable of handling 50,000 tons of storage. Along with this, the port can store 300,000 barrels or 12,600,000 US gallons (48,000,000 L; 10,500,000 imp gal) of bulk liquids. The port keeps a minimum draft of 26 feet (7.9 m), but this can vary due to weather.

Port of Milwaukee handled 2.3 million metric tons of cargo through its municipal port in 2022. Commodities handled include salt, steel, limestone, general cargoes, over-dimensional cargoes, grain, fertilizers, biodiesel, and ethanol.

In 2012, a wind turbine, funded by a federal grant, was installed. It is used to power the port's administration building, with the turbine providing electricity for the building itself as well as revenue from surplus generation.

The port is a key ferry and cruise ship destination on Lake Michigan. It is home to the Lake Express ferry, which offers service from Milwaukee to Muskegon, Michigan. In addition, the port received 33 cruise ship vessel calls and over 13,000 passengers in 2022.

The Sector Lake Michigan of the United States Coast Guard is based at the port.

== Recent Changes ==
In January 2020, the port suffered millions of dollars in damage from heavy winds and waves.

In October 2021, the port received a $35 million investment, the largest since the 1950s. The investment was designed to help with the shipping of "dry distillers grain with solubles" (DDGS), a coproduct of produced by the conversion of corn to ethanol, a significant bovine feed component.

In February of 2022, Port Milwaukee rescinded and renegotiated a land use agreement on, Urban Park, a 2.9 acre parcel of land (43°02'10.3"N 87°53'52.6"W) between Maier Festival Park and East Clybourn Street, creating the ability for it to be rented to the general public.
