= Cathedral of St. John the Evangelist (Milwaukee) =

Historic church in Wisconsin, United States

- St. John's Roman Catholic Cathedral
- U.S. National Register of Historic Places
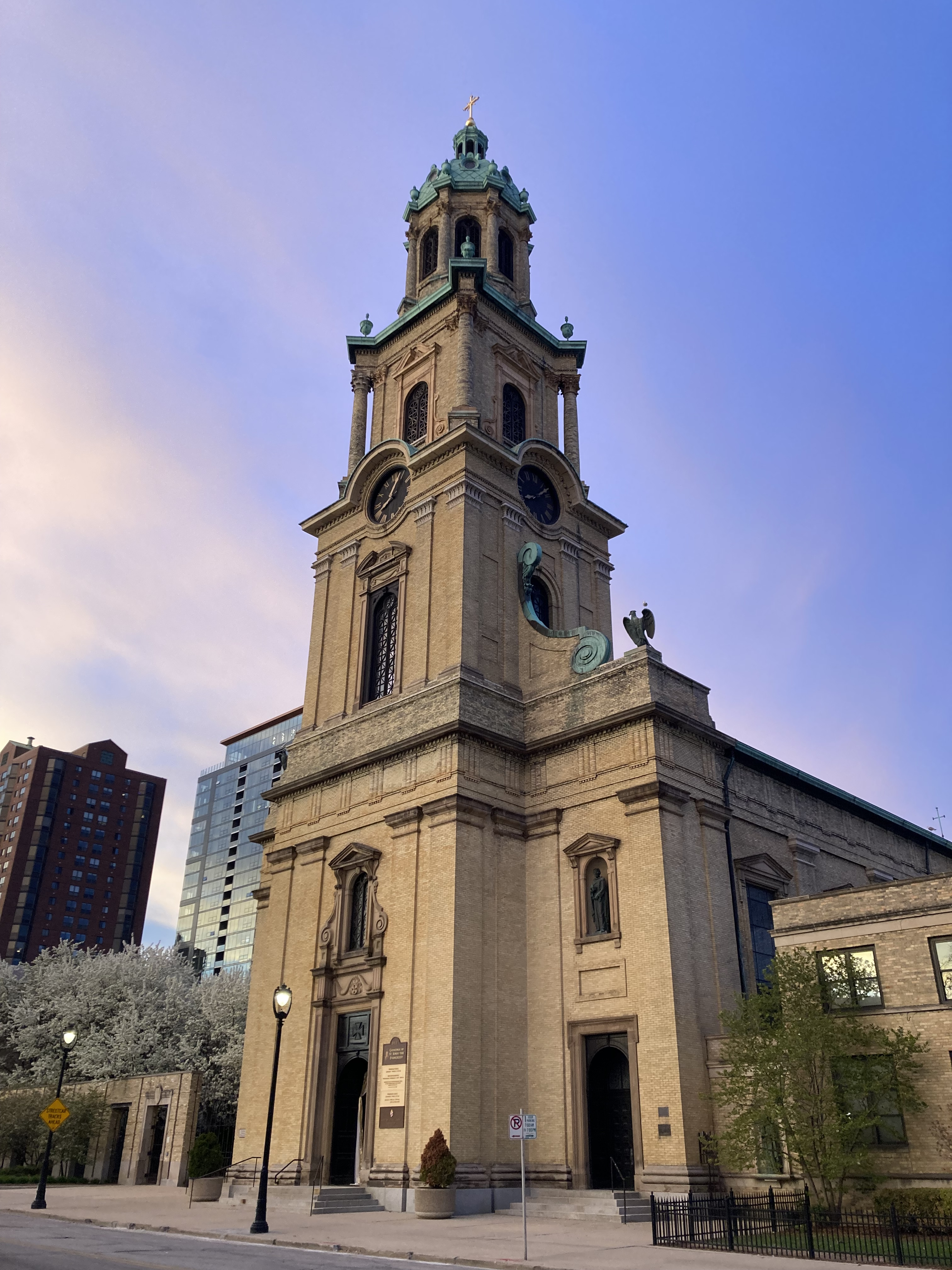
- Cathedral of St. John the Evangelist
- Location: 812 N. Jackson St. Milwaukee, Wisconsin
- Nearest city: Milwaukee, Wisconsin
- Coordinates: 43°2′30.43″N 87°54′14.88″W
- Built: 1847
- Architect: Victor Schulte
- NRHP reference No.: 74000108
- Added to NRHP: December 31, 1974

The Cathedral of St. John the Evangelist is the episcopal see of the Catholic Archdiocese of Milwaukee in Milwaukee, Wisconsin. The building itself is in German Renaissance Revival style, built in 1847, with changes after several fires. It is listed on the National Register of Historic Places and designated a Milwaukee Landmark. It is located just east of Cathedral Square Park.

== Description ==
=== 1830 to 2000 ===
During the 1830s, the Catholic Church in present-day Wisconsin was under the jurisdiction of the Diocese of Detroit. By 1843, the region had grown so much in population that Pope Gregory XVI erected the Diocese of Milwaukee, naming Reverend John Henni as its first bishop. He purchased land for a cathedral in Milwaukee in 1844 and laid the cornerstone for it on December 5, 1847. To pay for its construction, Henni solicited donations from Catholic communities in the Kingdom of Bavaria, Belgium, Mexico, and the Spanish Province of Cuba.

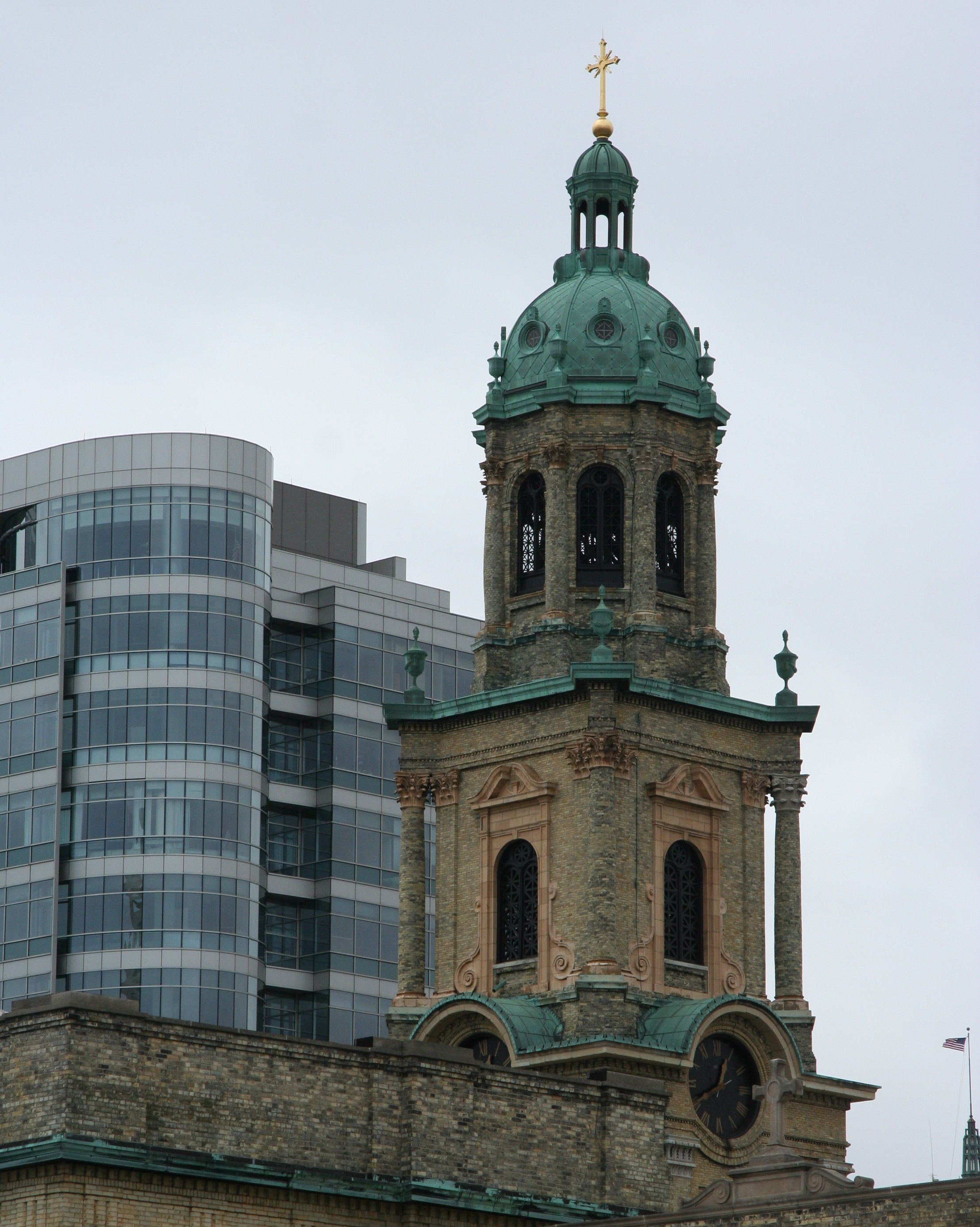
Steeple, Cathedral of Saint John the Evangelist (2012)

St. John the Evangelist Cathedral was dedicated in 1852, with a final cost of approximately $30,000. In 1875, Pope Pius IX elevated the Diocese of Milwaukee to the Archdiocese of Milwaukee. In 1893, the archdiocese was forced to replace the steeple above the clock as it had been judged unsafe. The archdiocese in 1906 constructed school and rectory buildings on the cathedral campus.

A fire in January 1935 gutted the church, leaving only the walls and steeple intact. The roof caved in, severely damaging the cathedral walls. The stained glass windows, mural paintings, and pipe organ were all destroyed. The rebuilding of Saint John the Evangelist was completed by December 1942. The cathedral celebrated its 150th anniversary in 1997.

=== 2000 to present ===
At the turn of the 21st century, Archbishop Rembert Weakland began planning for a major renovation of the Cathedral of Saint John the Evangelist. Archbishop Weakland wanted the cathedral to feature a more modern "post-conciliar" style. Weakland hired liturgical consultant Richard S. Vosko to plan the renovation. In 2001 a gated garden and atrium were added at the north end of the building.

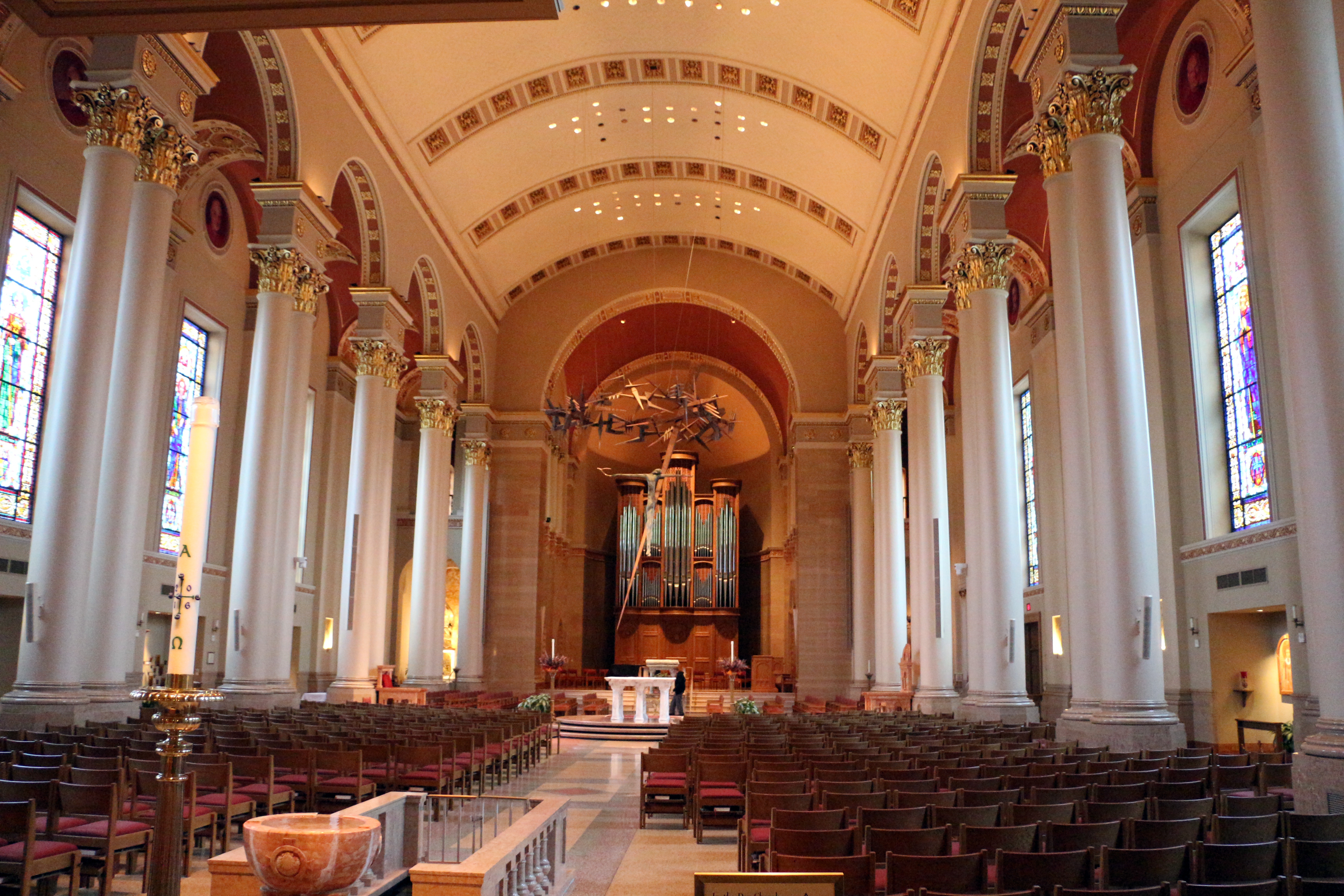
Nave, Cathedral of Saint John the Evangelist (2012)

One of the most controversial elements of the renovation was the dismantling of the high altar and baldacchino in the apse, replacing them with organ pipes. The sanctuary and altar were to be moved forward into the nave. These and other changes generated widespread opposition. A group of parishioners unsuccessfully petitioned the Vatican to stop the renovations. The renovations were completed in 2002.

The archdiocese in 2010 installed a bronze relief pedestal of Weakland in the cathedral. The sculpture portrayed Weakland standing with children, the Virgin Mary and other biblical figures. It immediately caused controversy as Weakland had paid a seminarian hush money about a sexual relationship and had also failed to remove priests with accusations of sexual abuse of children. The archdiocese replied that they had commissioned the pedestal before the revelations about Weakland and that it was still appropriate.

== Design ==
Saint John the Evangelist Cathedral was designed by architect Victor Schulte in the nineteenth-century Zopfstil (or "pigtail" style). It was constructed using cream city brick, a distinct light colored brick manufactured in Wisconsin.

The cathedral has 13 large hand-cut stained glass windows made by T.C. Esser Company of Milwaukee, designed by Erhardt Stoettner. A large tomb-shaped baptismal pool and marble font is situated in the center of the sanctuary.

The current tower was designed by the Milwaukee architects George Ferry & Alfred Clas.The first stage of the three-stage tower (up through the clocks) is Schulte's original design from the 1840s, and it is simpler than the higher stages. Its flat pilasters match those on the lower main block of the church. This is in keeping with the Zopfstil style

The sanctuary contains a fiberglass crucifix designed by Italian sculptors Arnaldo Pomodoro and Giuseppe Maraniell. The piece is topped with a crown of thorns, 14 feet (4.3 m) in diameter, hovering over the Christ figure .

== See also ==
- List of churches in the Roman Catholic Archdiocese of Milwaukee
- List of Catholic cathedrals in the United States
- List of cathedrals in the United States
