= Logistics of the 2024 Republican National Convention =

- 2024 Republican National Convention
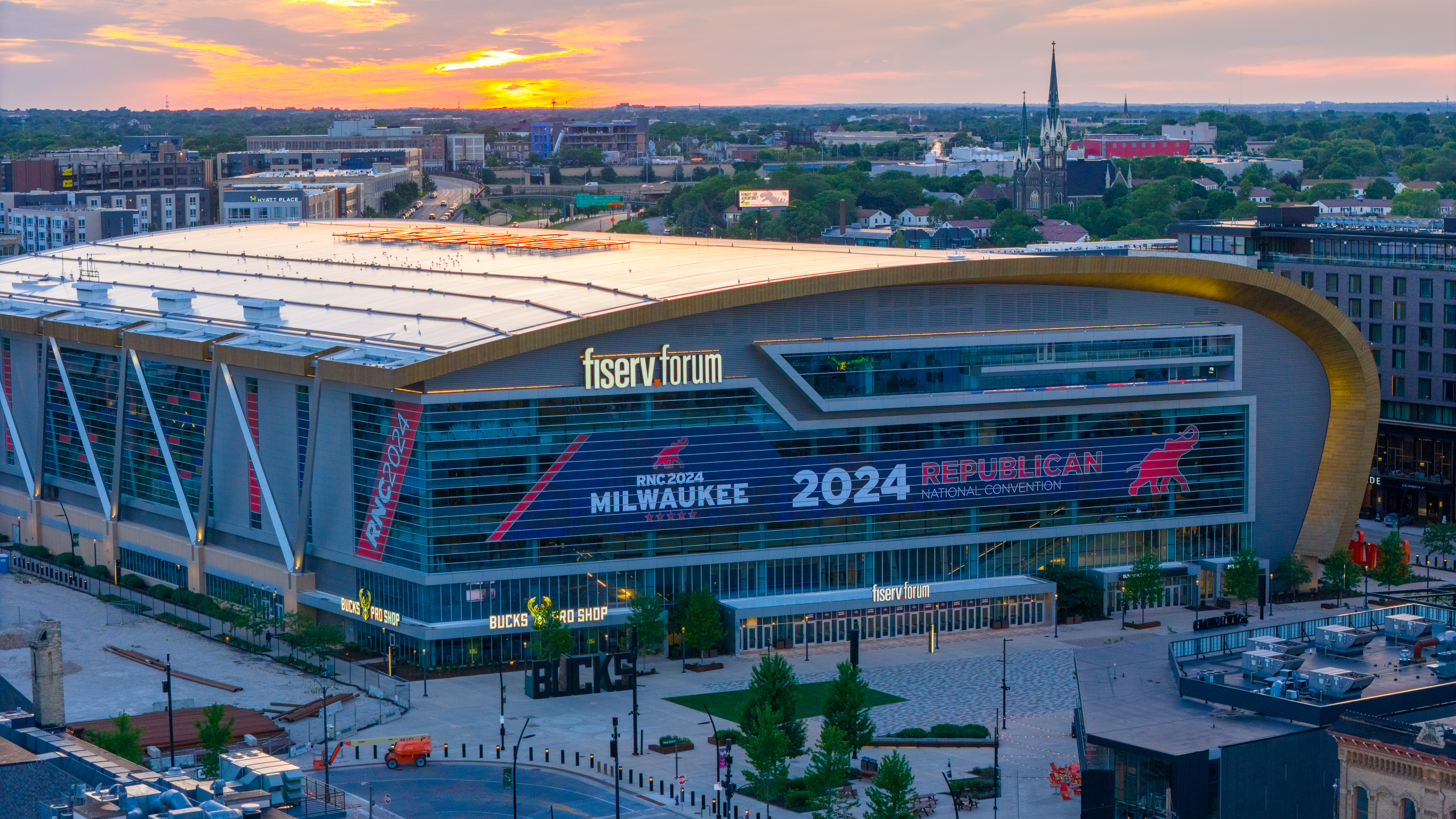
- Exterior of Fiserv Forum, decorated in preparation for the convention

Convention
- Date(s): July 15–18, 2024
- City: Milwaukee, Wisconsin
- Convention hall: Fiserv Forum
- Convention hall capacity: 17,000+
- Convention hall type: arena
- Other significant venues: Baird Center; UW–Milwaukee Panther Arena; Henry Maier Festival Park
- Held before or after DNC?: before
- NSSE designation?: yes

The 2024 Republican National Convention was held in Milwaukee, Wisconsin July 15–18, 2024. A large-scale event, the organization and facilitation of the convention involved complex and multifaceted logistics.

In April 2023, Milwaukee was selected to serve as the site of the convention. A key challenge of organizing the convention in Milwaukee was securing overnight accommodations for convention-related visitors. Milwaukee and its immediate metro area had fewer hotel rooms than is typical of a major party presidential convention host city.

Among the most complex aspects of logistics was security. The convention was a National Special Security Event (NSSE). Its security was coordinated by the Chicago ground office of the United States Secret Service, and required a significant number of non-local personnel for manpower. Extra public scrutiny was given to the convention's security after the Republican presidential nominee (Donald Trump) was the target of gunfire in an evident assassination attempt days before the convention. Convention-related protests occurred in Milwaukee, but were noted as being smaller in size than those seen at previous in-person major party conventions. Another major aspect of the convention's logistics was transportation. Adjustments were made by airlines to increase the number of passenger seats serving the city's Milwaukee Mitchell International Airport during the peak travel days of the convention. A significant amount of private aircraft traffic was also accommodated for the convention. Air travel out of the city after the convention was impacted by the 2024 CrowdStrike incident. Locally, adjustments were made to fixed bus routes due to vehicle restrictions in the perimeter of the convention's main venues.

Milwaukee received praise from convention goers for its performance as a host city. The convention, promised by officials to bring $200 million to the local economy, was criticized by many local businesses as failing to produce promised economic benefits in Milwaukee. Businesses in Chicago (the host of the 2024 Democratic Convention) are seen as having had greater success at booking convention-related reservations for the Democratic convention than businesses in Milwaukee were for the Republican convention.

== Site selection ==
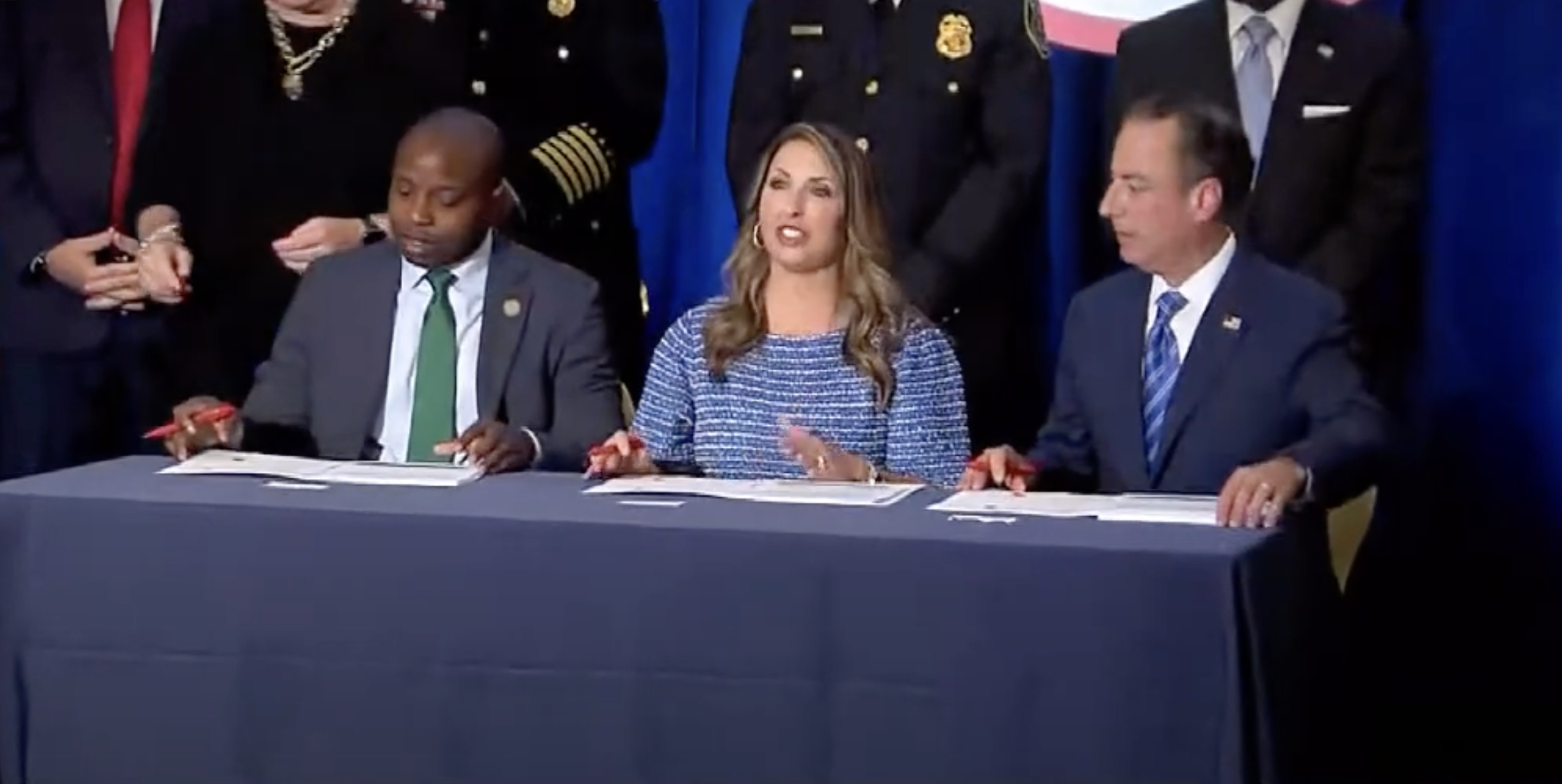
Hosting agreement being signed by (left to right) Milwaukee Mayor Cavalier Johnson, Republican Party Chair Ronna McDaniel, and Host Committee Chair Reince Priebus on August 5, 2022

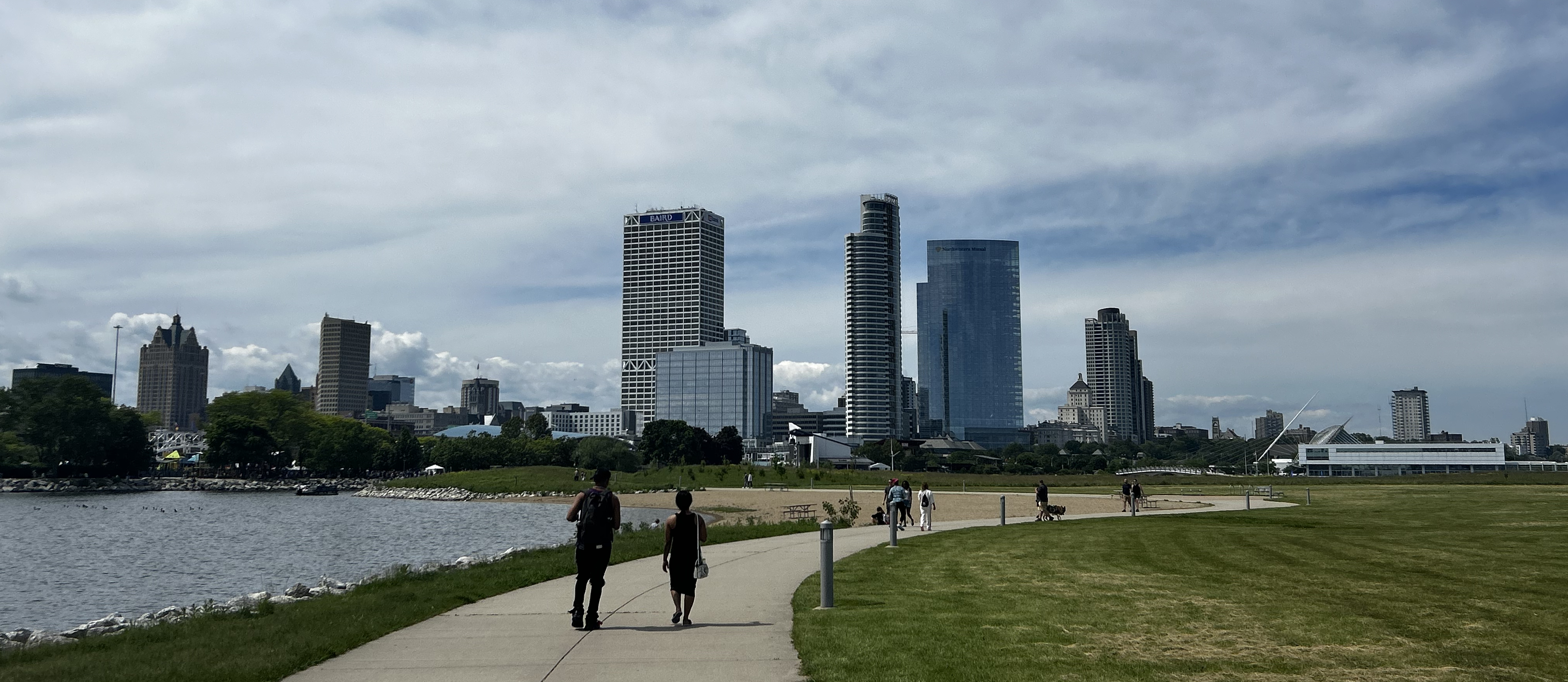
Milwaukee skyline, photographed in 2024

On January 7, 2022, a spokesperson for the Republican National Committee said that four potential host cities were in the running to be selected for the 2024 convention: Milwaukee, Nashville, Pittsburgh and Salt Lake City. Milwaukee was officially the host city for the 2020 Democratic National Convention, which was largely held virtually in assorted locations with Milwaukee only assuming the role of a production headquarters due to the COVID-19 pandemic. Milwaukee and Pittsburgh are both located in key swing states (Wisconsin and Pennsylvania, respectively) that had both played a significant role in determining the winner of the Electoral College in recent elections, while Nashville and Salt Lake City are both the respective state capitals of Tennessee and Utah, which have been reliably Republican states throughout most of the previous half-century (even though the capital cities themselves are considered Democratic strongholds within their states). From 2008 through the 2020 election, both the Democratic Party and Republican Party had only held their conventions in swing states. Houston had previously taken steps towards bidding, but decided against it due to conflicts with other scheduled events at venues. Other locations that had, at one point, an interest in hosting, but which ultimately did not bid, included Columbus, Las Vegas, San Antonio, and the state of Georgia. Kansas City, Missouri had made a formal bid, but withdrew their bid in late December 2021, prior to the finalist cities being named.

On February 4, 2022, Pittsburgh's bid committee announced that their bid had been eliminated from further consideration. In early March 2022, Salt Lake City was eliminated by the Republican National Committee, leaving Milwaukee and Nashville as the two remaining finalist bid cities.

The Metropolitan Council of Nashville and Davidson County voted against a draft hosting agreement, which effectively forfeited the city's bid.

On July 15, 2022, a site selection committee unanimously voted to recommend Milwaukee as the site of the convention over Nashville. The Republican National Committee voted for Milwaukee to be the party's 2024 convention host during its early August 2022 meeting in Chicago.

Milwaukee was the first city to host major party conventions in consecutive elections since New York City hosted both the 1976 and 1980 Democratic National Conventions. However, the 2024 convention was Milwaukee's first time hosting a normal in-person presidential nominating convention, since the 2020 convention was held with a "virtual" format.

In terms of population, Milwaukee is smaller than other metropolitan areas that have hosted recent major party conventions. Milwaukee is among the smallest metropolitan areas to have hosted a major party convention.

On April 11, 2023, it was announced that Chicago had been selected to host the 2024 Democratic National Convention. Milwaukee and Chicago are approximately 90 miles apart on the coast of Lake Michigan. This is a highly unusual proximity for two different cities hosting major party conventions in the same year. Not since 1972, when both conventions last shared a host city, have the sites of the two major party convention sites been so closely located.

On December 21, 2022, the Republican National Committee announced that the convention's dates would be July 15–18, 2024.

Bidding cities
City	State	Status of bid	Venue	Previous major party conventions hosted by city
Milwaukee	Wisconsin	Winner	Fiserv Forum	Democratic: 2020 (Note: The 2020 Democratic National Convention was held across parts of the United States amid the impact of the COVID-19 pandemic, but was officially centered in Milwaukee.)
Nashville	Tennessee	Finalist (bid eliminated in August 2022)	Presumably Bridgestone Arena and/or Music City Center	—N/a
Salt Lake City	Utah	Finalist (bid eliminated in March 2022)	Vivint Arena	—N/a
Pittsburgh	Pennsylvania	Finalist (bid eliminated in February 2022)	Presumably PPG Paints Arena and/or David L. Lawrence Convention Center	—N/a
Kansas City	Missouri	Non-finalist (bid withdrawn in December 2021)	T-Mobile Center	Democratic: 1900; Republican: 1928, 1976

== Host committee ==
Host committee logo

=== Host committee leadership ===
Reince Priebus served as the chairman of the MKE 2024 Host Committee. From September 2022 until May 2023, the host committee's chief executive officer (CEO) was Stephen B. King. In May 2023, it was announced that Milwaukee businessman Ted Kellner would be replacing King as CEO, but that King would remain a member of the Host Committee.

=== Host committee finances ===
The convention's host committee initially aimed to raise $65 million to fund the convention. They raised $85 million in funds to stage the convention, beating a modified goal of $68 million. In July 2023, when signing the state budget into law, Governor Tony Evers used his line item veto power to decrease state funding for the convention from $10 million the Wisconsin Legislature had approved to $1 million.

Large corporations were more hesitant than with previous elections to sponsor either major party convention. Among the companies sponsoring the convention events was Wisconsin-based Fiserv. Fiserv also plans to be a sponsor of the Democratic convention. Kohl's (a major company with corporate headquarters in Milwaukee) opted against sponsoring convention events. Kohl's stated that they intend to avoid sponsoring either party's 2024 conventions. A viral internet claim falsely alleged that Kohl's had "pulled out" of a deal to sponsor the Republican convention, despite the fact that the company had never entered any agreement to be a sponsor. Kohl's indirectly supported the Republican convention, however, by donating to the Metropolitan Milwaukee Association of Commerce (MMAC) that gave financial support to the convention host committee. Many local companies assisted the convention financially without being sponsors. Ashley HomeStore announced a gift of $350,000 in furniture to be used first by the host committee for the convention, and thereafter to be donated to local nonprofits.

The Heritage Foundation, the group behind Project 2025, were among the convention sponsors. This was despite Trump's efforts to publicly distance himself from Project 2025 in the eyes of voters.

== Committee on Arrangements ==
Working with the host committee on behalf of the Republican National Committee is convention's Committee on Arrangements. On March 24, 2023, Anne Hathaway was appointed chairwoman of the committee and Ron Kaufman was appointed general chairman. Elise Dickens was named as chief executive officer on June 1, 2023. On June 29, 2023, further committee members were announced, including KC Crosbie as treasurer, Vicki Drummond as secretary, and David Bossie as co-chair. Other members of the committee that were announced included Maripat Krueger, Brian Schimming, and Tom Schreibel.

== Volunteers ==
The operation of the convention is, in part, facilitated by thousands of local volunteers. On March 1, 2024, the host committee formally launched its volunteer recruitment effort. At the time, host committee chairman Ted Kellner cited a likely need of between 8,000 and 10,000 volunteers.

On June 4, 2024, the host committee reported being 700 volunteers shy of a goal of 4,000. This was despite the deadline for application. This was with six weeks remaining until the start of the convention and only one day left until its final deadline for individuals to apply to become volunteers.

== Contingency planning for the possibility of a Trump imprisonment ==
On June 3, 2024, Donald Trump (the Republican presumptive nominee for president) was convicted by a jury in the State of New York on 34 felony counts of falsifying business records, which carry a potential penalty of imprisonment. His sentencing was originally scheduled for June 11 (four days prior to the start of the convention). This created the possibility that Trump might be sentenced to a prison sentence that could start prior to the convention. Shortly after Trump's conviction, Republican National Committee Co-chairman Michael Whatley publicly stated that the committee was prepared to facilitate a remote delivery of Trump's acceptance speech from within the confines of a prison if such a scenario arose. Others familiar with convention planning confirmed that plans were being made for if Trump opted or was forced by circumstances to deliver his circumstances (such as imprisonment) to deliver his acceptance remotely. However, the convention's senior advisor Brian Hughes denied that any such plans were even being considered. However, Republican National Committee co-chair Lara Trump indicated that the party recognized a need to be "ready for anything" and stated that the committee should have "several" contingency plans.

On July 11, the judge presiding over the trial delayed sentencing in order to first craft a judgement on whether Trump's conviction was at all invalidated by the holding delivered by the Supreme Court of the United States in their Trump v. United States decision earlier that month. This delay nullified any concerns about Trump serving a prison sentence during the convention.

== Weather concerns ==
Previous major party presidential conventions have been impacted by weather concerns. In 2012, both major party's modified their conventions as a result of weather concerns. That year, Republicans cancelled the proceedings of their convention's first day due to concerns of possible impact by a hurricane. Citing concerns of possible thunderstorms, the Democrats abandoning plans to use a 65,000 seat open-air football stadium for the final evening of their convention, and instead held it in the same indoor arena that they had held its other evenings in.

On July 12, 2024, the National Weather Service's predictions indicated the potential of severe weather impacting Milwaukee sometime in the period spanning from July 13 through July 16. This created the possibility of weather prior to the convention impacting air travel into Milwaukee, or weather on the days of the convention impacting aspects of the convention itself. There was also the predicted possibility for high temperatures as severe as 100 °F (38 °C) during the period in which the convention would be held.

On the eve of the convention, there was still a predicted possibly of severe thunderstorms, strong winds, or even tornadoes in Milwaukee on the first day of the convention. By the morning of the convention's opening day, predictions were for "uncomfortable" heat and humidity in the daytime, and possible nighttime thunderstorms. The first day of the convention saw high temperatures in Milwaukee during the daytime and severe weather at night, including flood warnings in the greater region surrounding Milwaukee. Temperatures around noon on the first day reached as high as 90 °F (32 °C; 305 K).

== Hotels and other lodging ==
The event was anticipated to potentially bring 50,000 visitors to Milwaukee. A heavy majority of Milwaukee hotel rooms, as well as short-term rentals listed on Airbnb, were booked in advance of the convention.

=== Hotels ===
Milwaukee and its immediate metro area have a smaller number of hotel rooms than can be needed for a major party presidential nominating convention. As a result of this, the 2020 Democratic National Convention, before plans changed due to the COVID-19 pandemic, was originally expected to house a large share of convention delegates in hotel rooms located in Illinois. However, due to the fact that Republican conventions have fewer total delegates than Democratic conventions, it has been reported that the plans for the 2024 Republican Convention do not entail such far-flung accommodations for delegates. Some visitors for the 2020 Democratic Convention were originally anticipated to stay in Madison, Wisconsin. Madison, Wisconsin's visitors bureau have confirmed that, when Milwaukee city was bidding, Milwaukee officials inquired with them about Madison's hotel availability around the time of the convention. At the time of the convention, the approximate number of hotel rooms in Milwaukee city limits was 6,000,

To accommodate convention visitors, the host committee worked with a Chicago-based firm in aims of securing hotel rooms in more than 300 hotels and motels located within a 60-mile radius of the convention site. Ultimately, the committee reported in reaching agreements with 111 Wisconsin hotels. with approximately 20,000 rooms total in its immediate market.

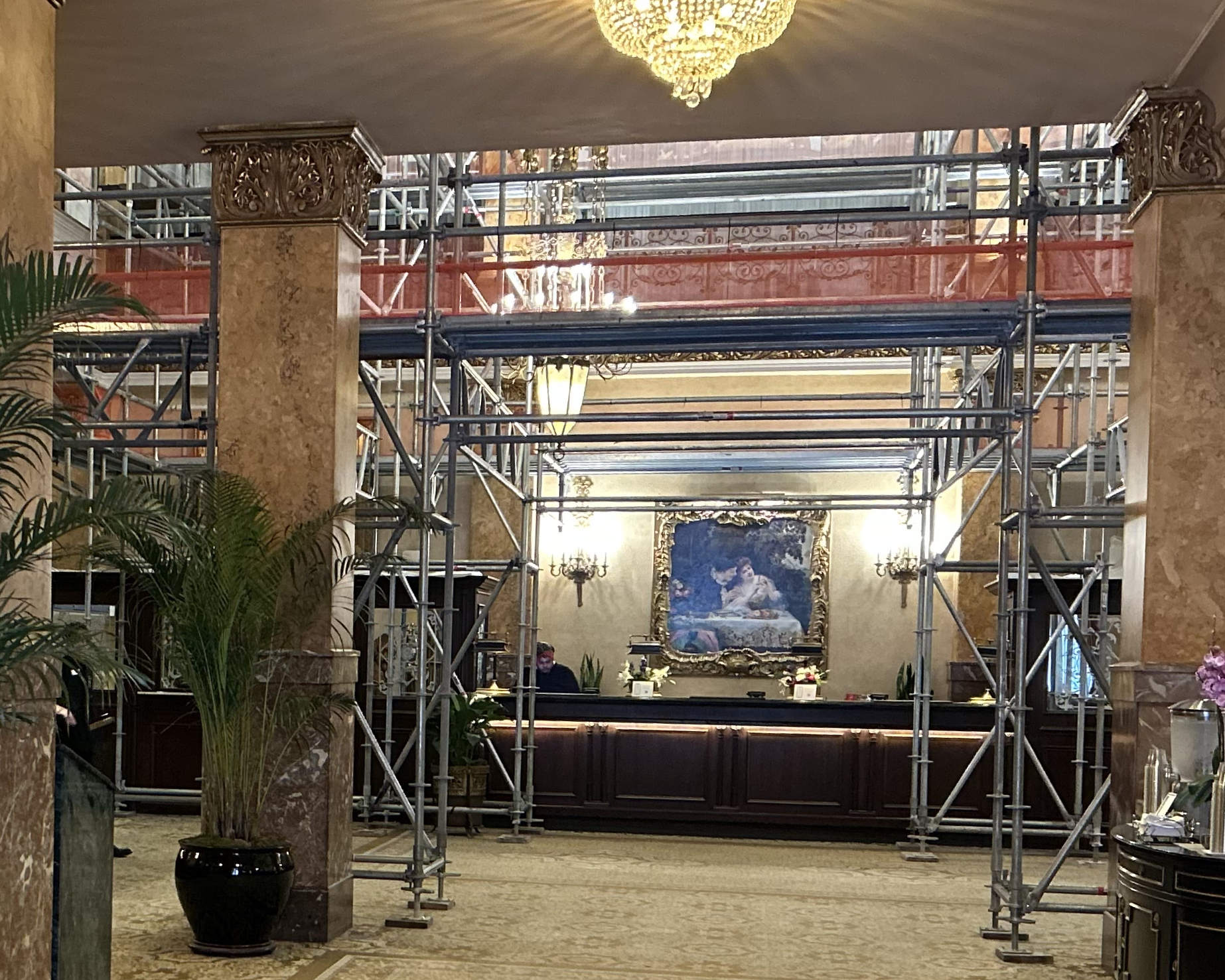
The lobby of The Pfister Hotel undergoing renovation work in March 2024

Some hotels in Milwaukee (either coincidentally or related to the city's hosting of the convention) underwent renovations prior to the convention. Shortly before the convention, The Pfister Hotel (a prominent hotel in the city) completed the second phase of a $20 million three-phase renovation.

Hotels in Milwaukee at near-capacity occupancy during the convention period, which marks much greater-than-usual occupancy. Many many rooms have been charged at high prices.

A key consideration was delegate hotels. Organizers prioritized keeping members of each state's delegation housed either in a single hotel, or otherwise in neighboring properties. Organizers cited ease of arranging delegate transportation, as well as the greater benefit of increased camaraderie within delegations as their motivation for this. Some delegates stayed in hotels an hour's drive from the Fiserv Forum. In addition to hotels in Milwaukee and its metropolitan area, hotels in other cities of the region were also used to house delegates. This included hotels in the cities of Kenosha, Kohler, Lake Geneva, Madison, and Racine. The counties in which delegate hotels were located were Milwaukee, Dane, Jefferson, Kenosha, Ozaukee, Racine, Washington, Walworth, Waukesha. When delegate hotel assignments were originally unveiled, there was criticism of organizers' initial decision to locate delegates representing the host state (Wisconsin) a sizable distance from the Fiserv Forum, rather than in a venue nearer to the convention venue (which is regarded as preferable by delegates). Originally, Wisconsin's delegation was given rooms in the Delta Hotel by Marriott in Racine. These plans were ultimately shifted, with Wisconsin's delegation instead given a smaller number of rooms at a much nearer hotel.

=== University dormitories ===
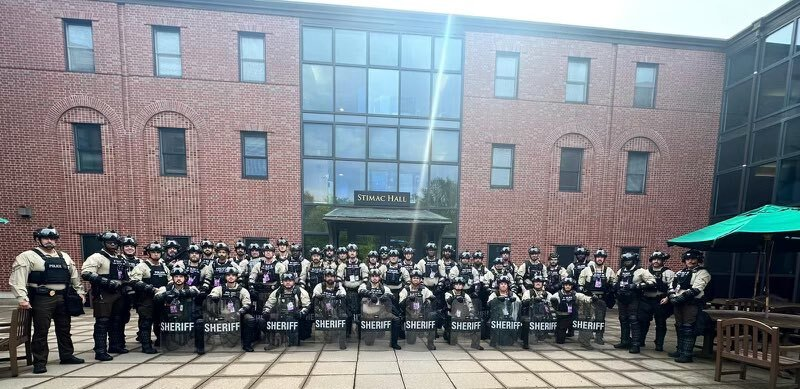
Members of the Miami-Dade Police Department's Rapid Deployment Force pose outside of a dorm at Wisconsin Lutheran College, where some non-local law enforcement officers were housed during the convention

Since the early stage of convention planning it was anticipated that dormitories at local colleges and universities would be utilized as accommodations during the convention. The original plans for a full-scale 2020 Democratic Convention in the city had similarly used dormitories to accommodate some convention guests and volunteers.

The city of Milwaukee sought to secure 4,000 dorm rooms, reaching out to Concordia University Wisconsin, Carroll University, University of Wisconsin-Whitewater, University of Wisconsin-Madison, and Mount Mary University. It intended for some of these to house out-of-town police officers that would be working convention security. In August 2023, it was announced that Marquette University would adjust their academic calendar to allow for the availability of their dorms during the convention. During the convention, non-local law enforcement officers were housed in dorms on the campuses of Carroll University, Concordia University, University of Wisconsin–Whitewater, and Wisconsin Lutheran College.

=== Short-term rentals ===
Milwaukee relatively-small number of hotel rooms led to a surge in rates being charged for short-term-rentals in Milwaukee.

== Security ==
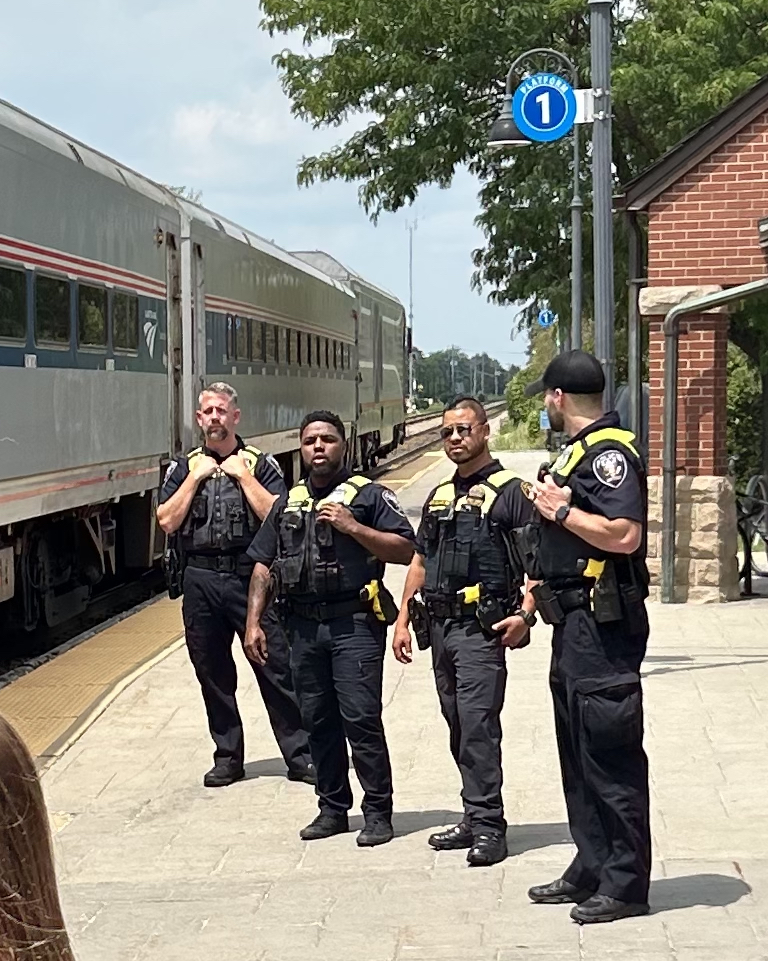
Officers patrolling the station in Glenview, Illinois

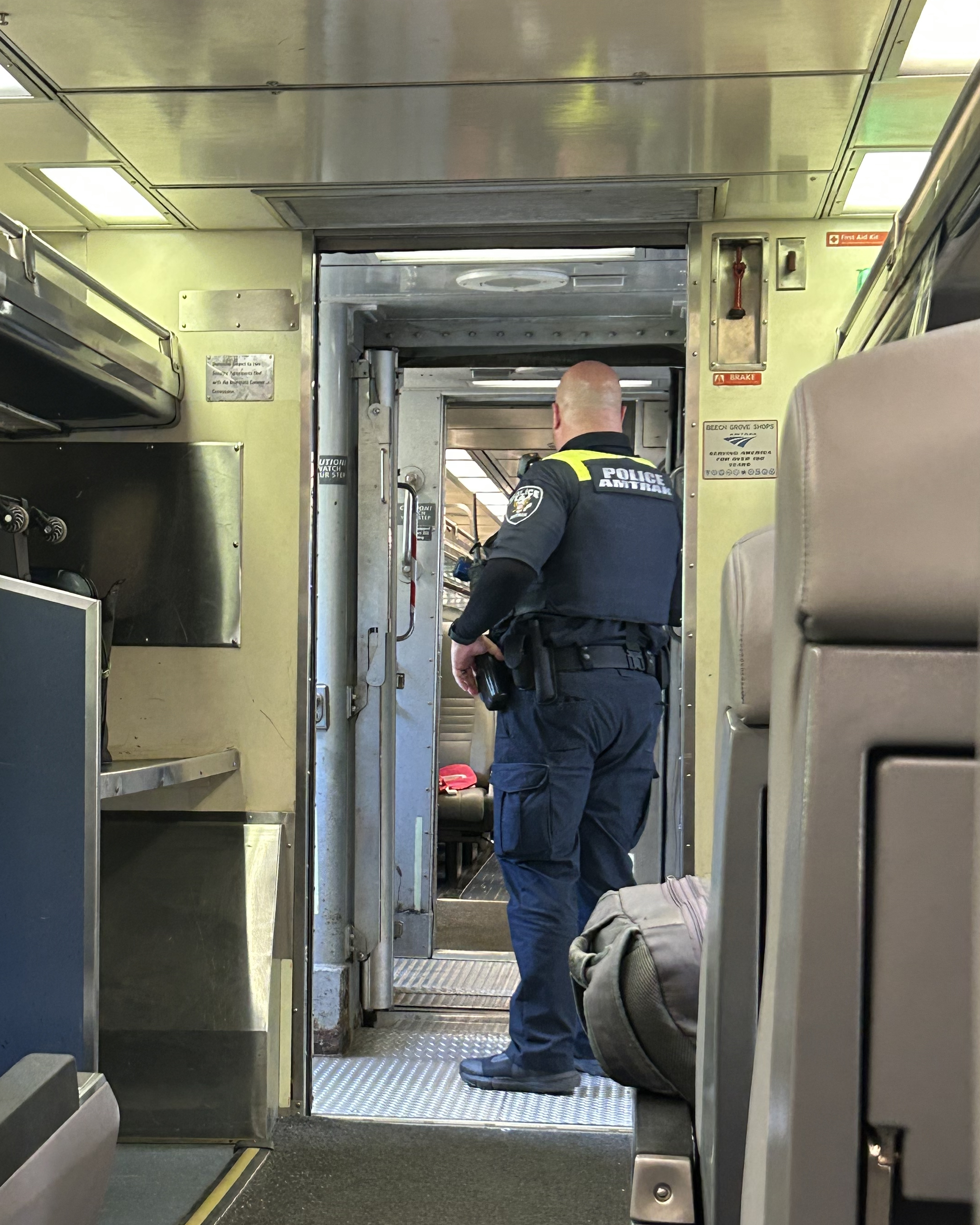
Officer patrolling en route train

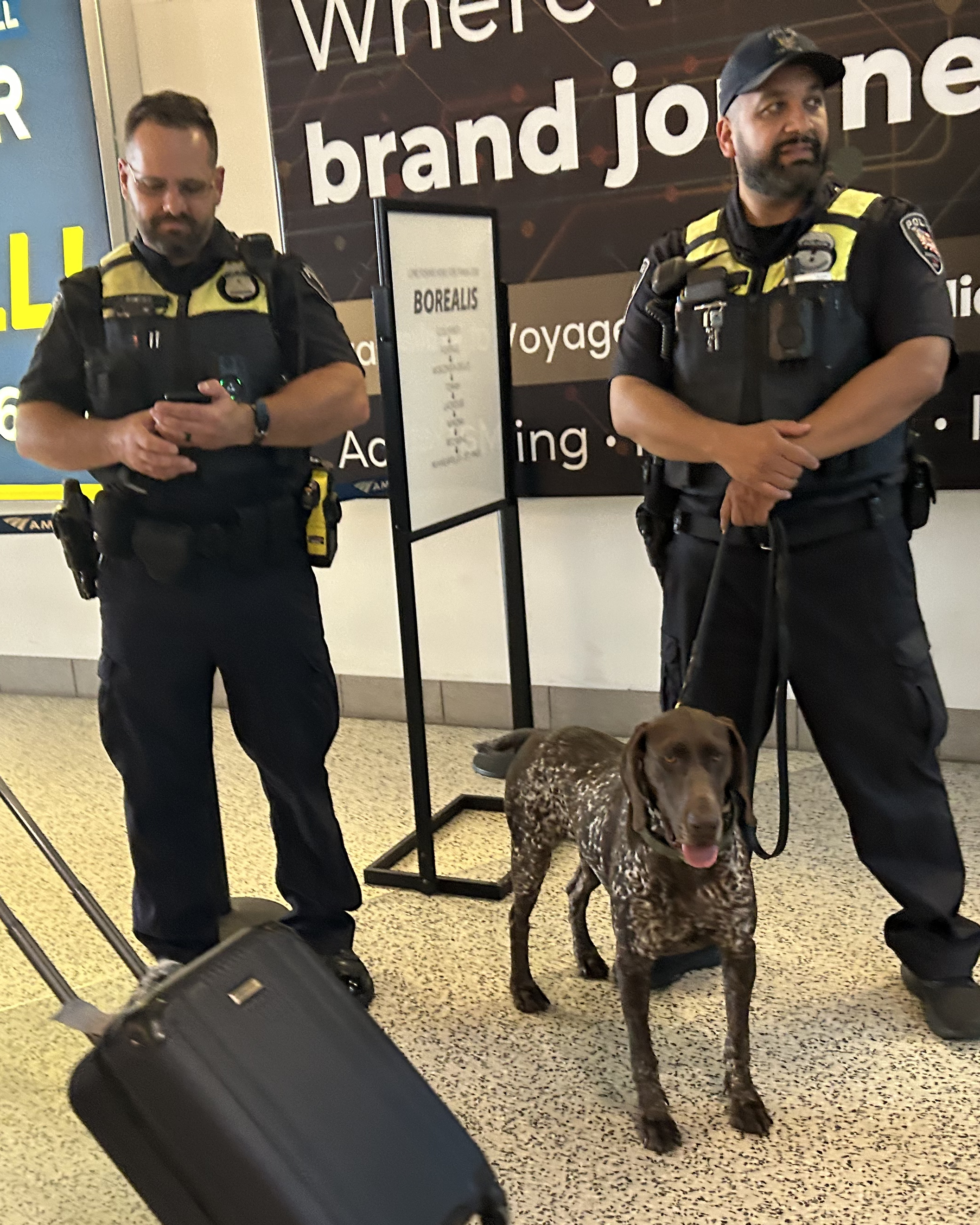
Milwaukee Intermodal Station

Amtrak Police patrol a Hiawatha train into Milwaukee on July 13, 2024 (the penultimate day before the convention)

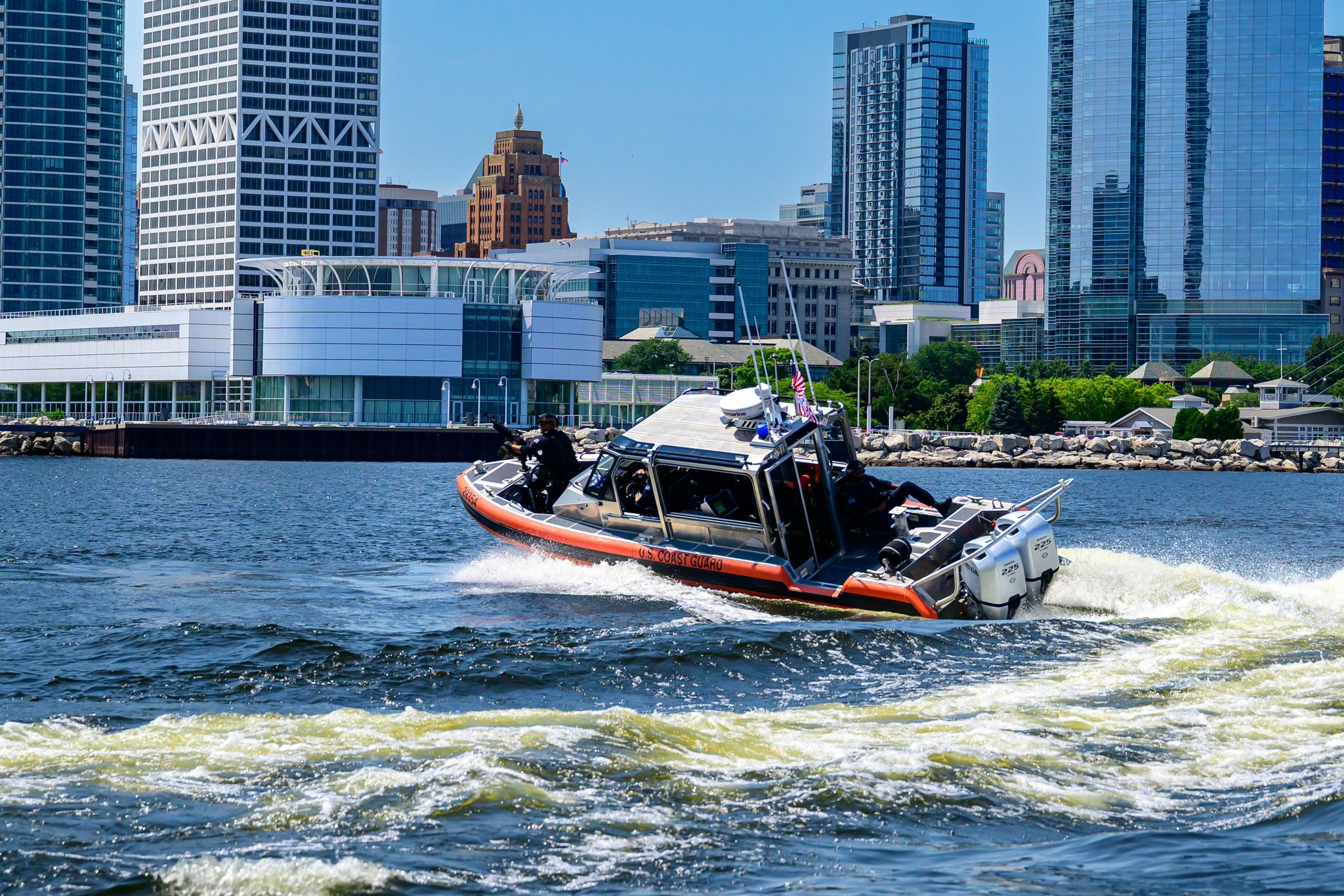
US Coast Guard patrols the coast of Milwaukee (near Discovery World) ahead of the convention

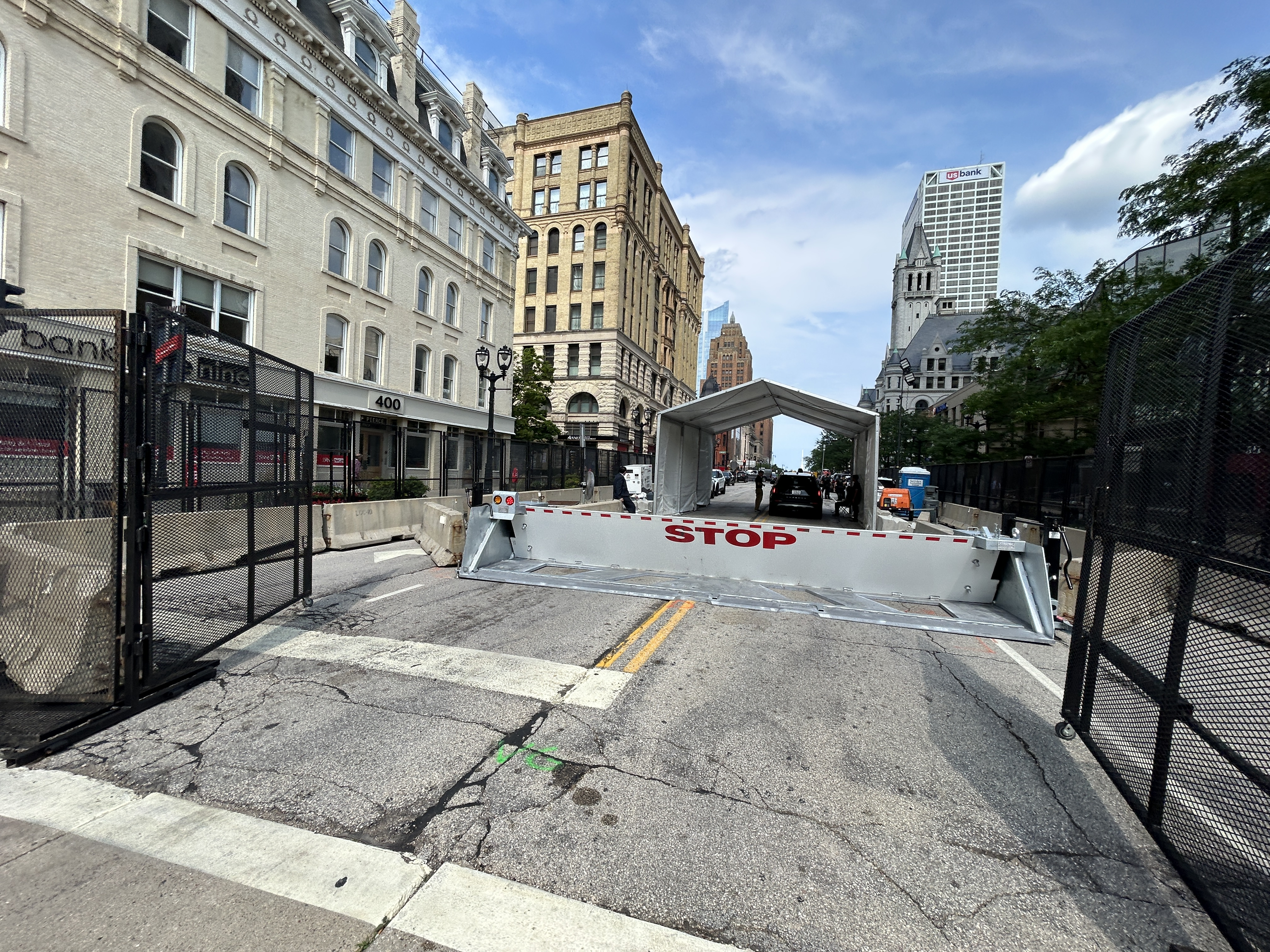
Security screening outside of The Pfister Hotel, where Republican presidential nominee Donald Trump was announced to be staying during the convention

The convention was a National Special Security Event (NSSE) entailing a massive security operation involving many agencies. Preliminary ground for the security of the convention began years prior to the event.

The convention security was primarily headed by the United States Secret Service through its Chicago office, whose region Milwaukee falls within. Federal law mandates that the Secret Service acts as lead coordinator of any events designated as an NSSE. The office played same the role for the 2024 Democratic National Convention held weeks after. This marked the first election in which the nominating convention of both party's was coordinated by the same field office of the Secret Service. The office began the heavy work of planning security for both conventions many months prior to the start of Republican convention. With less than 100 agents assigned to the office, most of the office's agents had been assigned involvement within the office's role in convention security. Coordination was required with refuse pickup providers, package delivery providers, and the United States Postal Service in order to minimize interruption to local residents while also maintaining security.

In April 2023, Milwaukee Mayor Cavalier Johnson stated that he believed the considerations that should inform security plans for the 2024 Republican National Convention should include the original security plans for a full-scale 2020 Democratic National Convention in the city and input for the U.S. Secret Service. He also stated that the security plans should reflect the political climate, noting the January 6, 2021, United States Capitol attack.

=== Funding ===
Milwaukee received $75 million in federal grants for convention security. This was a $25 million increase from what laws had previously allocated to convention host cities. Before 2024, laws had allocated $50 million to convention host cities, an amount unchanged since adoption of legislation in 2004. In March 2024, the U.S. Congress passed legislation to increase the amount allocated to convention hosts cities by $25 million following months of lobbying by lawmakers from both Wisconsin and Illinois (the two states that would host major party conventions in 2024).

=== Agencies and personnel ===
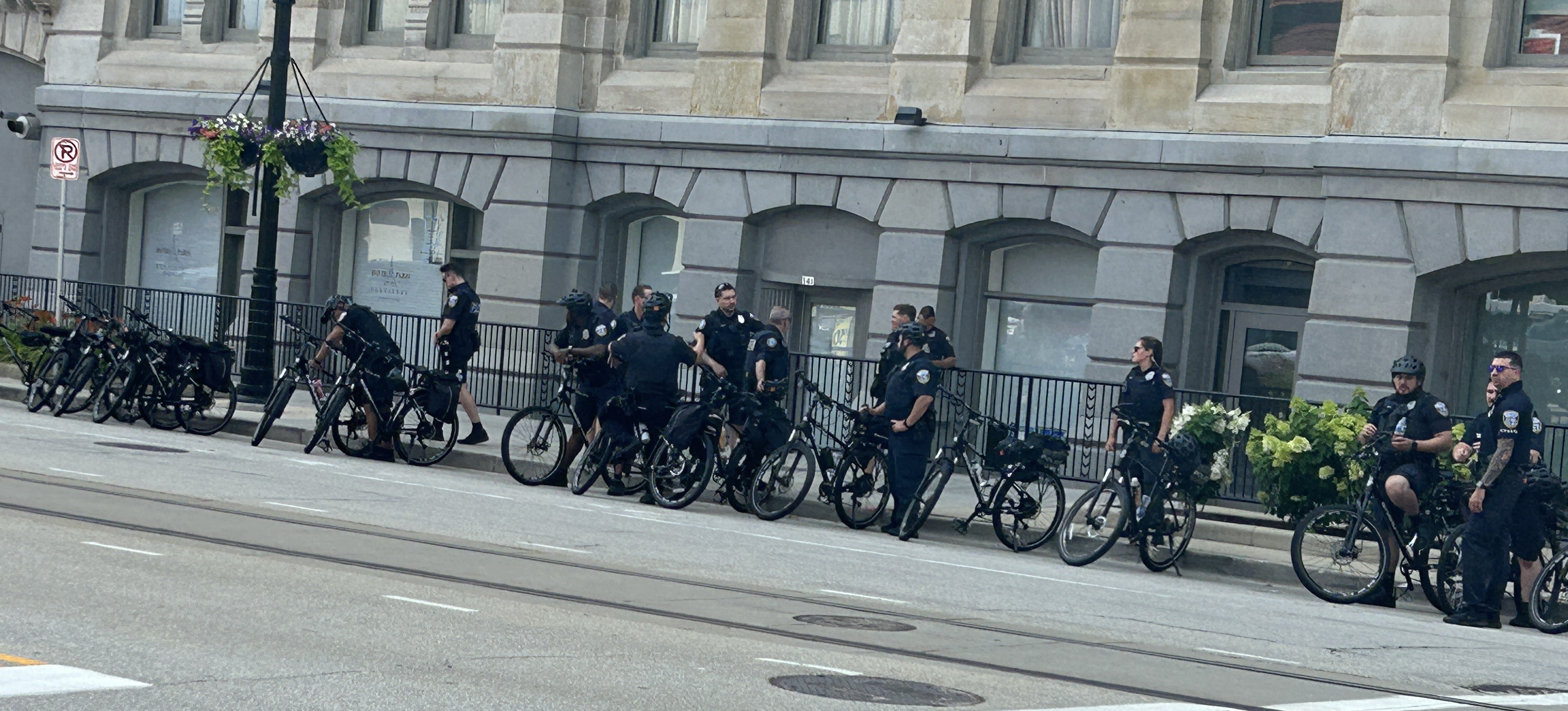
Police officers providing security

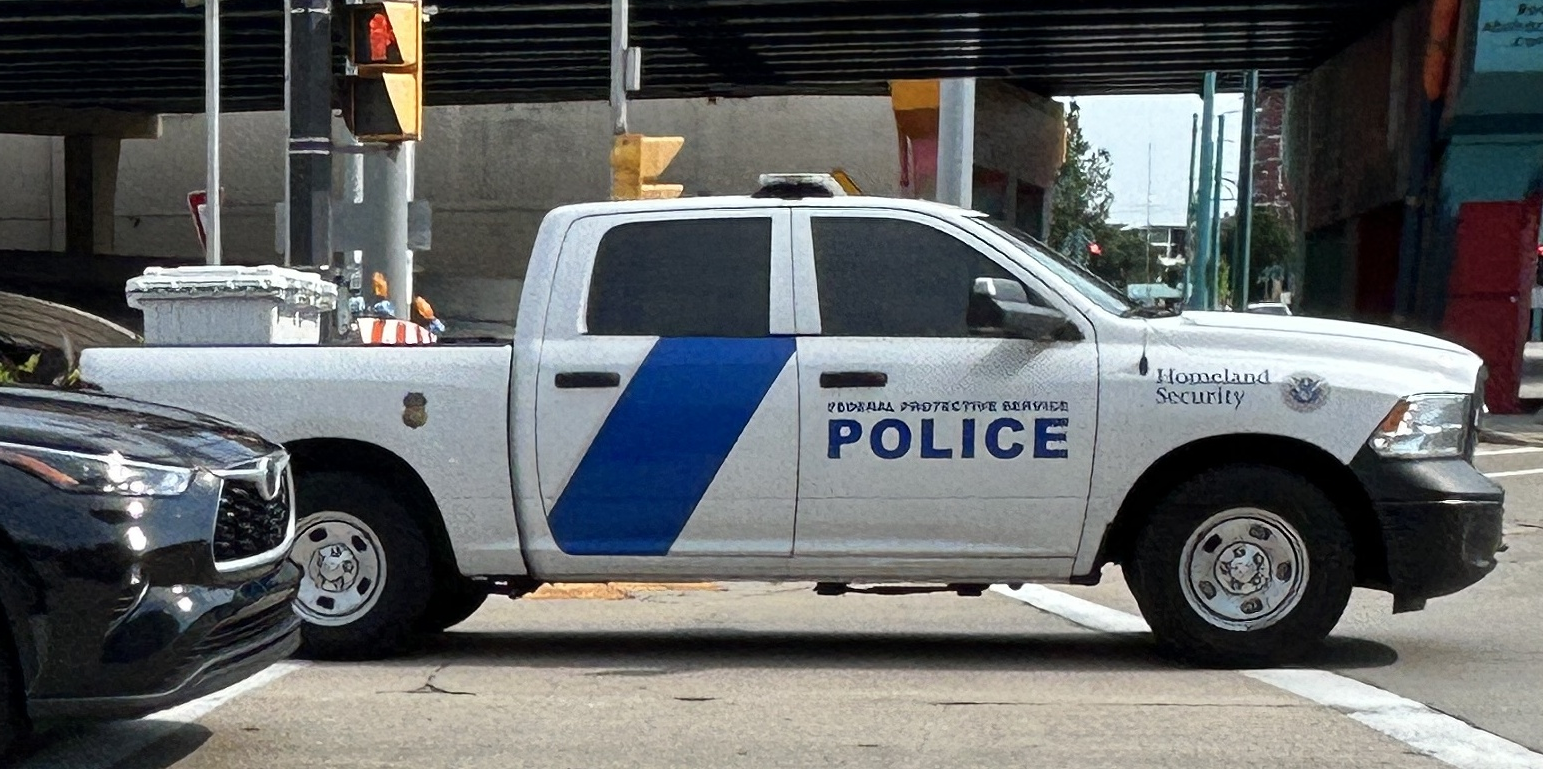
Department of Homeland Security (DHS) vehicle during the convention

Federal law requires that security coordination for events given NSSE designation to be led by the Secret Service, which oversees coordination between every agency and entity involved in securing the event. It also requires that federal agencies such as the FBI, NSA, and CIA to provide support.

The Milwaukee Police Department, Wisconsin State Patrol, and other local law enforcement agencies played a key role in convention safety and security. Additionally, of out-of-city police officers assisted in securing the city during the convention. As of April 2023, it was estimated that security for the Republican National Convention could necessitate 4,500 police officers from agencies outside of Milwaukee Police Department. This number is 1,500 greater than the number of outside police officers that had originally been expected in the plans for a full-scale 2020 Democratic National Convention in the city. 44 police agencies from elsewhere in Wisconsin and more than 63 out-of-state police departments from 24 states plus the District of Columbia are providing officers to help secure and police Milwaukee during the convention. Included were two agencies with history of major party conventions previously held in their own cities: Cleveland MetroPark police and Cuyahoga County Sheriff's Office (Cleveland hosted the 2016 RNC) as well as the Charlotte-Mecklenburg Police Department (Charlotte hosted the 2012 DNC and a portion of the downscaled 2020 RNC).

The 128th Air Refueling Wing of the Air National Guard (which is based at Milwaukee Mitchell International Airport played a role in convention security.

Out-of-state National Guard assisted in securing the convention. The Pentagon claimed that 1,700 National Guard trops (primarily from guards of Wisconsin, Minnesota, and North Dakota) were deployed to Milwaukee for convention security.

=== Security perimeters ===
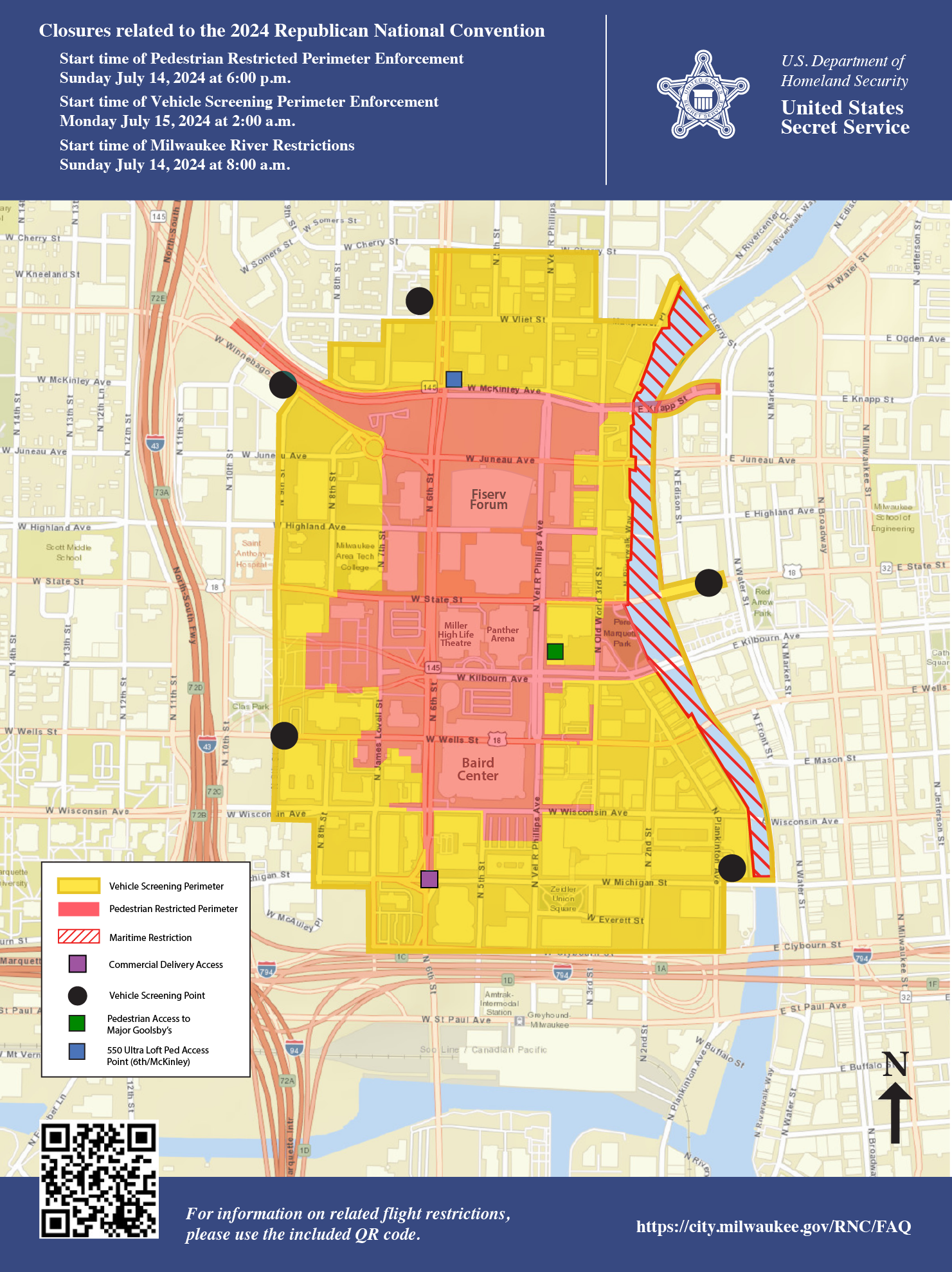
Map of the main security perimeter around the convention venues

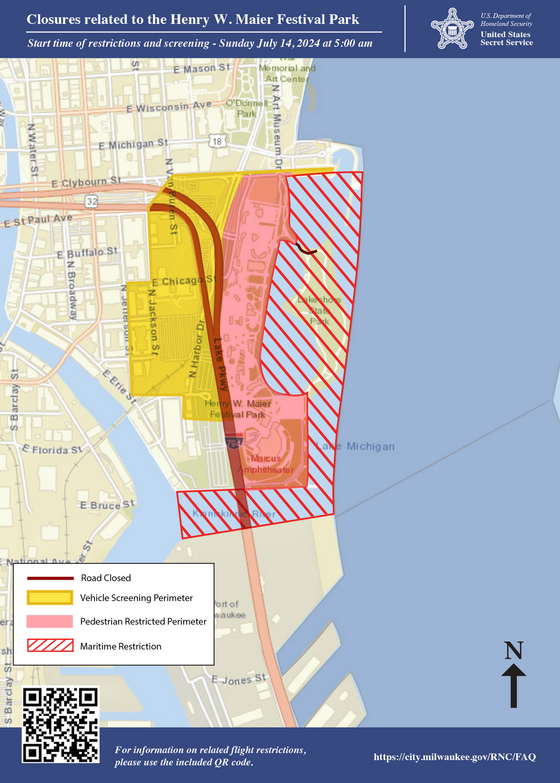
Map of the July 14 security perimeters around the Henry Maier Festival Park

US Secret Service/DHS maps of the security zones

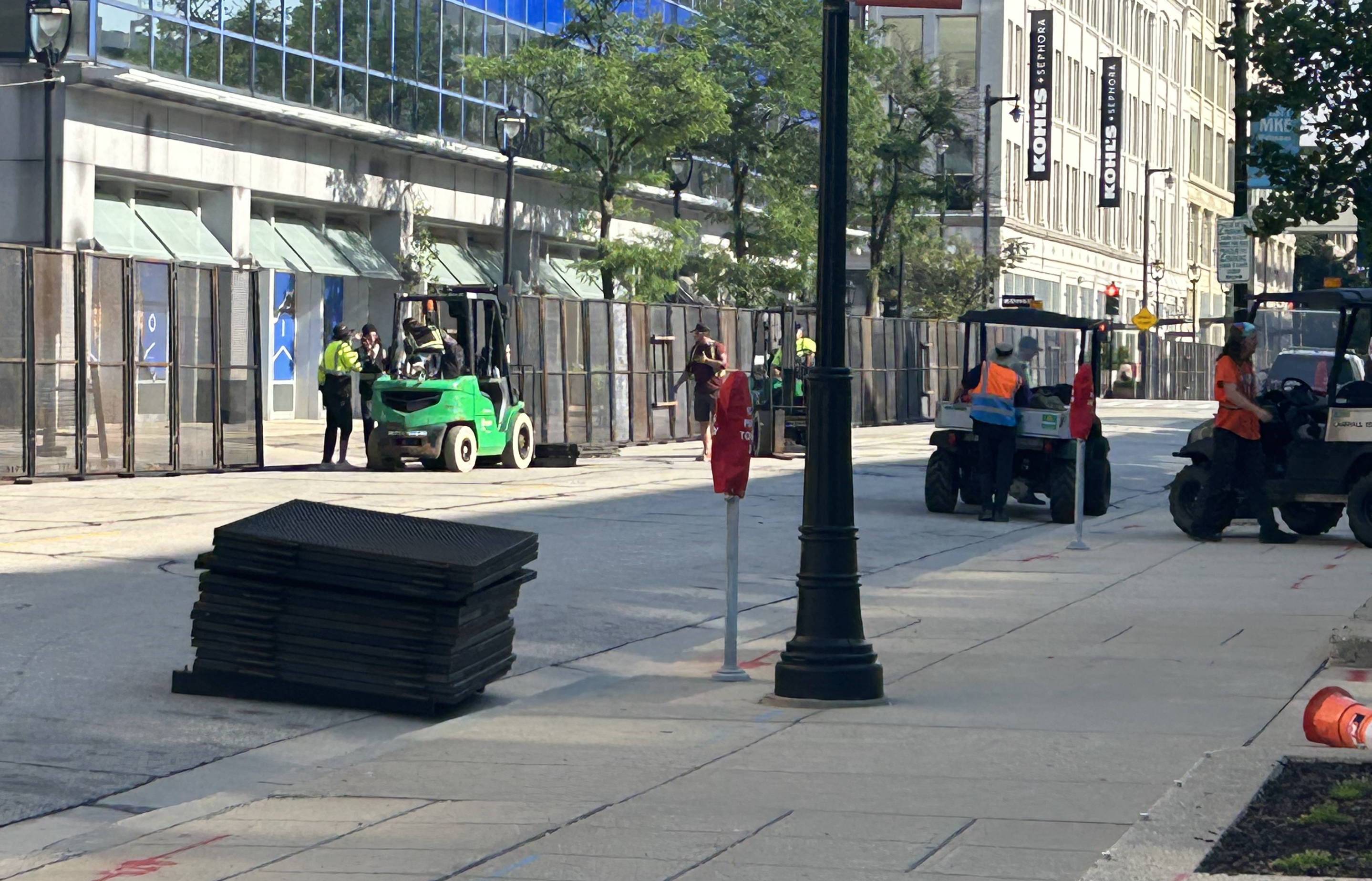
Temporary fencing being erected near the Baird Center ahead of the convention

The security perimeters of the convention were twofold: there was a central "hard" security perimeters in which only credentialed individuals were permitted, and an outer security perimeters in which credentials were not required, but for which vehicles were screened at security checkpoints prior to entry. Two sets of separate security perimeters were established for the convention: a main one surrounding the convention's main venues, that was scheduled to be "hardened" (begin to enter effect) on July 14; and a second one securing the Henry Maier Festival Park on July 14. The close proximity of the main venue and several secondary venues used for the convention allowed them all to be contained in a single "hard" security zone. The vehicle screening perimeter of the security zone surrounding the main venues of the convention measured ten city blocks by six city blocks. The Milwaukee Common Council approved the restriction of many items from the convention's security footprint.

Firearms were allowed in the general security footprint, but were restricted in the "hard" security zone. State law in Wisconsin prevented the city of Milwaukee from acting to prohibit guns in the general security footprint. In the "hard" security zone near the convention venues (accessible only to credentialed individual), the Secret Service only permitted law enforcement agents to carry firearms. In June 2024, the a committee of the Milwaukee Common Council rejected a proposed ordinance by Alderman Robert Bauman to have the city independently prohibit firearms from the entire security footprint, with much of the opposition being on the grounds that state law forbid the city from independently acting to do so.

=== Change to bodycam footage policy ===
Acting upon a request by Milwaukee Police Chief Jeffrey Norman, in May 2023, the Milwaukee Fire and Police Commission approved a suspension lasting from July 12 through July 26, 2024, of the city 15-day policy for the release of bodycam footage. The 6–3 vote of the Milwaukee Fire and Police Commission to authorize this was held in closed session without public comment. This move received criticism from community activists. The ACLU of Wisconsin published an opinion opposing the suspension of the policy.

=== Flight restrictions ===
Temporary flight restrictions are in place at both Milwaukee Mitchell International Airport and Lawrence J. Timmerman Airport during the convention. Before being allowed to land at these airports, private flights were required to first clear security at Dane County Regional Airport or Gerald R. Ford International Airport.

=== Heightened concerns following July 13 assassination attempt ===
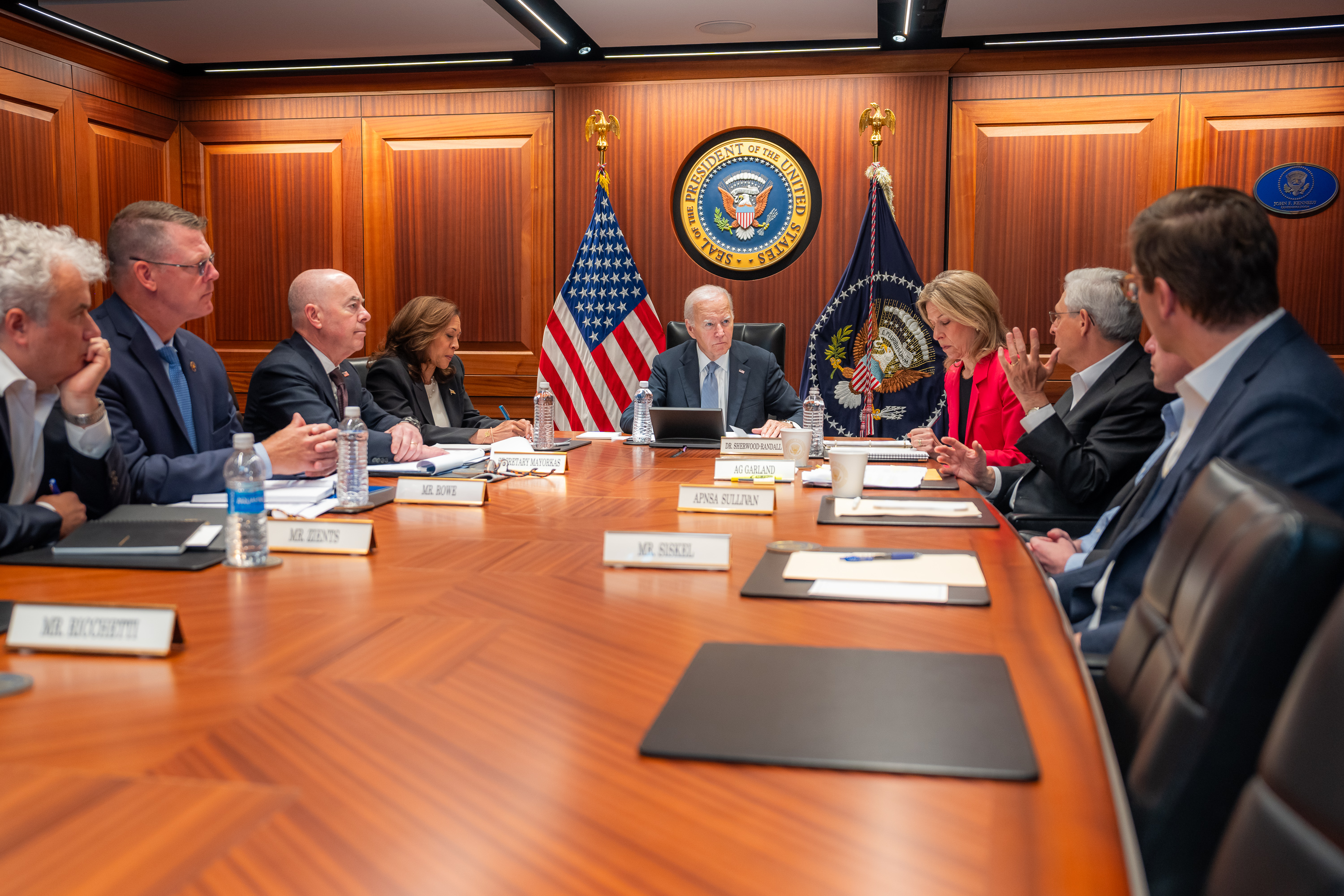
President Biden, Vice President Harris, and other officials in the White House Situation Room during a July 14 briefing by the DHS

On July 13, 2024 (the penultimate day before the start of the convention), Trump was target of an assassination attempt at a campaign rally in Butler PA, heightening concerns about the convention's security. The evening of July 13, a joint statement by the Trump campaign and Secret Service confirmed the intent to hold the convention as scheduled without mentioning any changes to security plans.

On July 14, President Joe Biden stated that he had ordered the Secret Service to re-review all security measures, placing emphasis that he wanted such scrutiny of security measures to be all-encompassing. Later that day, it was announced that the security zone around the convention would be expanded to create increased buffer zones around the convention venues. After the apparent assassination attempt, Wisconsin Governor Evers publicly urged for action to be taken to restrict firearms in the entirety of the security zone.

=== Incidents during convention ===
On July 14 (the eve of the convention), two individuals were arrested near convention security zones. Both arrests were related to intoxication, with one individual being arrested near to the Henry Maier Festival Grounds (being used for an official convention welcome party that evening), and the other individual being arrested after crashing into a barrier of the main security zone while driving under the influence. On July 15, a man was arrested, cited, and released for disorderly conduct for behavior towards protesters at Red Arrow Park.

On July 16, officers from the Columbus Division of Police (Columbus, Ohio) who were working in Milwaukee for the convention fatally shot a man in Milwaukee's King Park. That same day, a Code Pink organizer was arrested following an altercation with Congressman Derrick Van Orden near The Pfister Hotel.

== Handling of demonstrations and protests ==
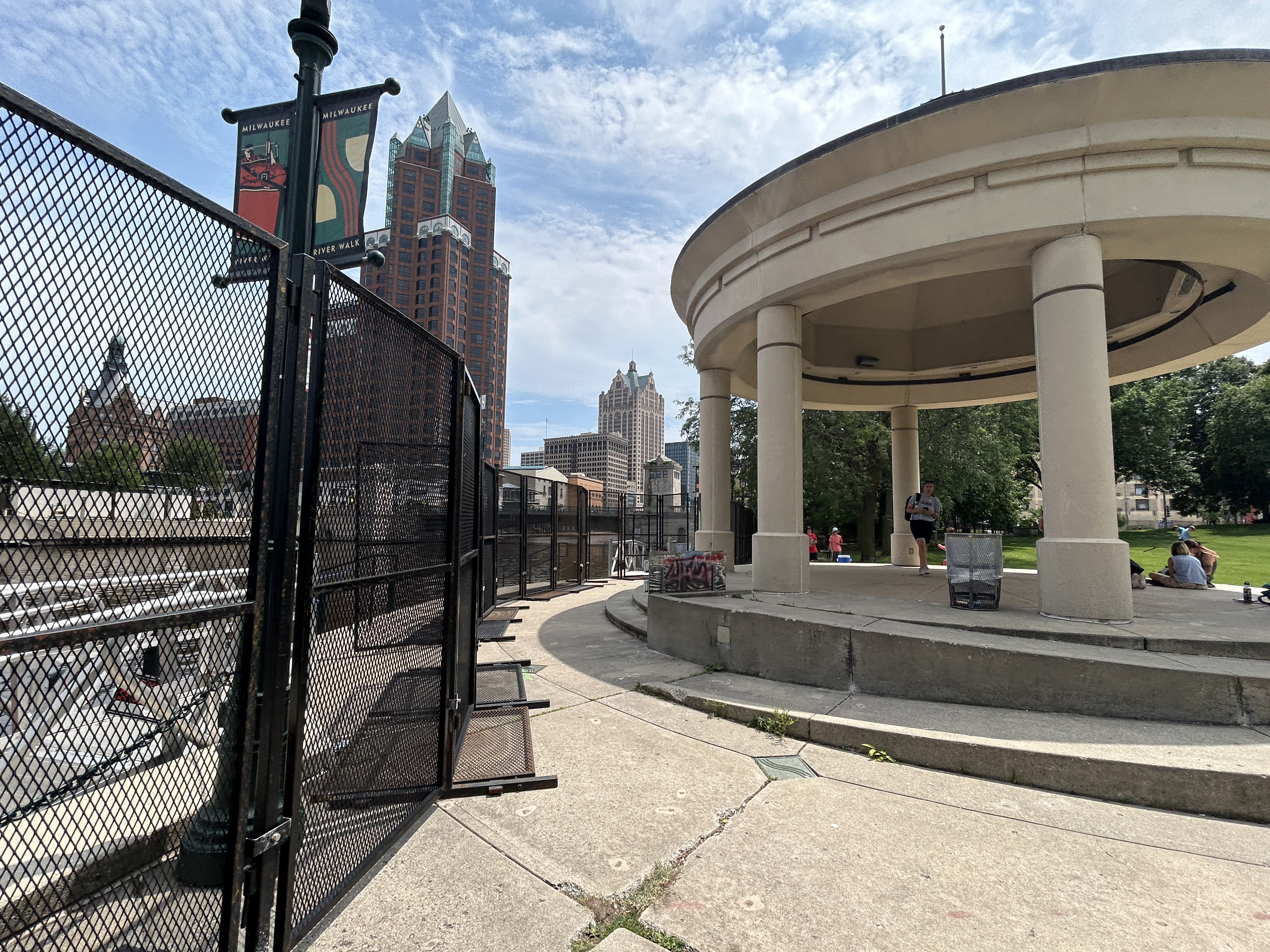
Fencing being installed at Père Marquette Park prior to the convention. The decision to make this park inaccessible to protesters generated controversy.

The Republican Party objected to the prospect of Père Marquette Park being utilized as a site for public demonstration (protest), arguing that it was too near to convention activities and therefore posed a security risk. Ultimately, a committee of sixteen organizations agreed that the park was too close to the Milwaukee County Historical Society building, which was to be utilized for official convention events. The convention organizers only booked the building for use several weeks prior to the convention itself, and their objection to protesters using the park had preceded this booking. The park was made inaccessible to the public during the convention, a decision that has generated controversy.

Zeidler Union Square and Haymarket Square Park were both assigned as designated demonstration zones. The American Civil Liberties Union (ACLU) and the Coalition to March on the RNC 2024 unsuccessfully sued the City of Milwaukee, arguing that the restrictions on what routes a permitted protest parade could take were unconstitutionally distant from the Fiserv Forum and that the city needed to permit a route within "sight and sound" of the arena.

The Coalition to March on the RNC 2024 was given a permit to host a large rally in Milwaukee on the first day of the convention. The main protest on the convention's first day was the largest protest held in Milwaukee during the convention's run. Police estimated that this protest had as many as 1,000 demonstrators, while organizers claimed the crowd size numbered closer to 3,000. Regardless, the protest fell well below its organizers' pre-convention estimates of attracting between 5,000 and 10,000 participants. The rally assembled at Red Arrow Park in the city's downtown. It included a march to an area near the convention's security perimeter, before returning to the park. Local police estimating that between 700 and 800 protesters marched. Issues advocated on by protesters included support for abortion rights, support for immigrant rights, and opposition to Israel's actions in the Gaza War. A separate marching protest was also held on the first day of the convention by the Poor People's Army (a group led by activist Cheri Honkala). Jill Stein (the third-party candidate for the Green Party) spoke at this protest. The protests were peaceful, with only two arrests made on the convention's first day.

News media noted that the convention saw fewer protests than most past in-person presidential conventions had seen. An article by The Associated Press speculated that protests at the Democratic convention in nearby Chicago the following month would be much larger, and that the protests in Milwaukee were being treated by activists as a mere warmup for their planned Chicago protests the following month.

== Communications infrastructure ==
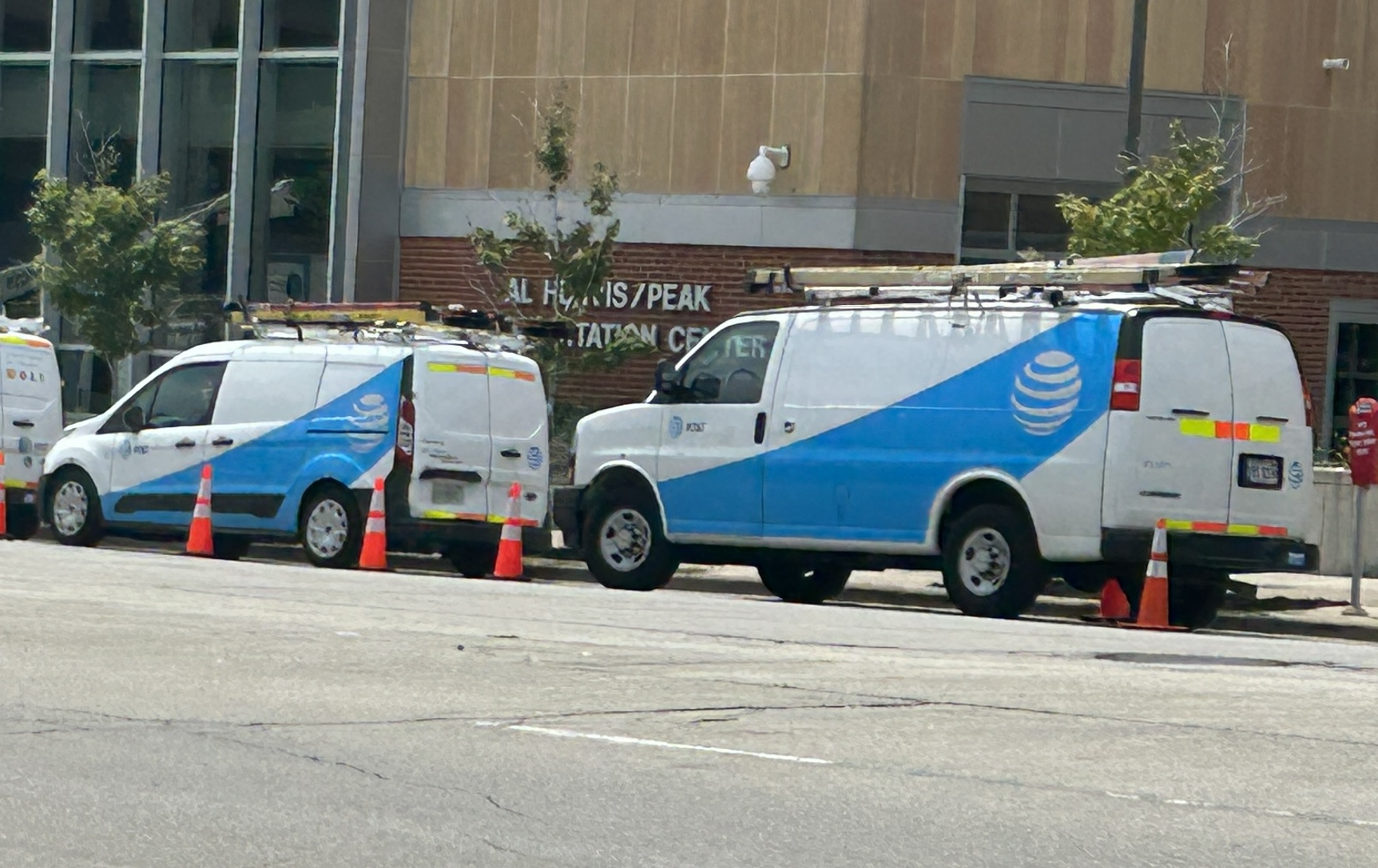
AT&T vehicles near the Fiserv Forum during preparations for the convention

AT&T provided network connectivity services to both major party conventions in 2024.

Cellular carriers U.S. Cellular, Verizon, and AT&T undertook work that permanently upgraded their mobile networks in Milwaukee ahead of the convention in order to accommodate the large crowds that would be coming to the city for the convention.

== Conversion of the Fiserv Forum into convention hall ==
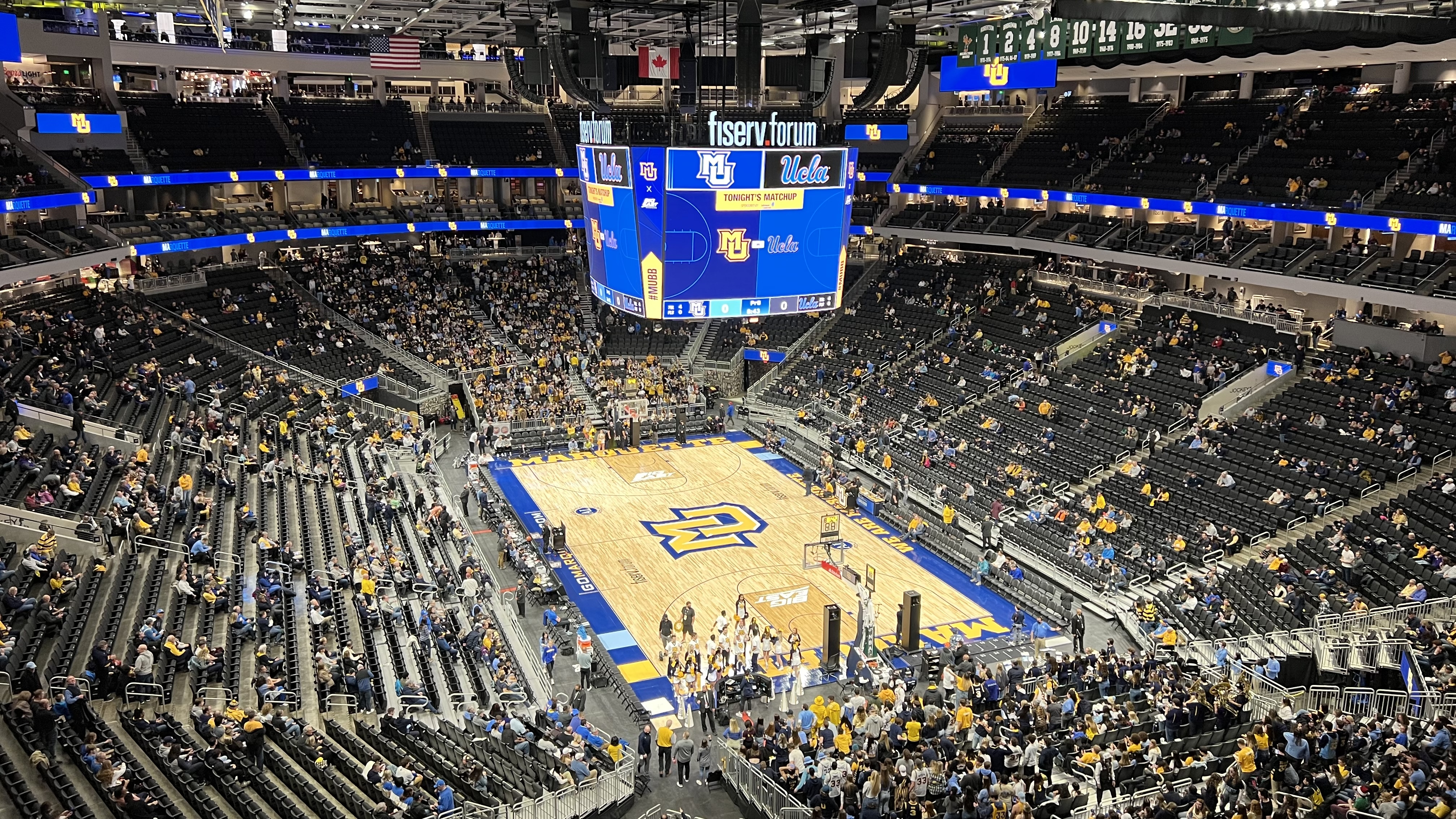
Interior of the Fiserv Forum during a 2021 Marquette University basketball game

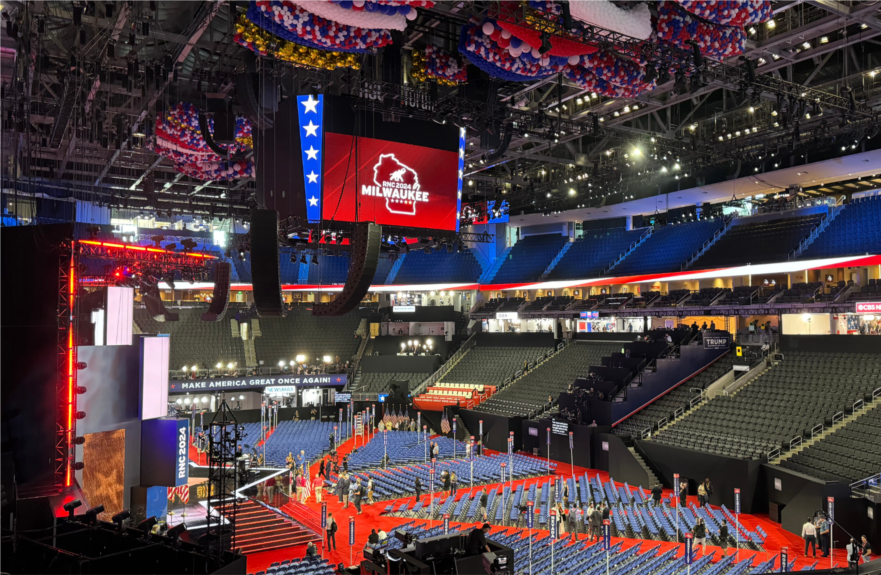
Interior of the Fiserv Forum, as setup for the convention

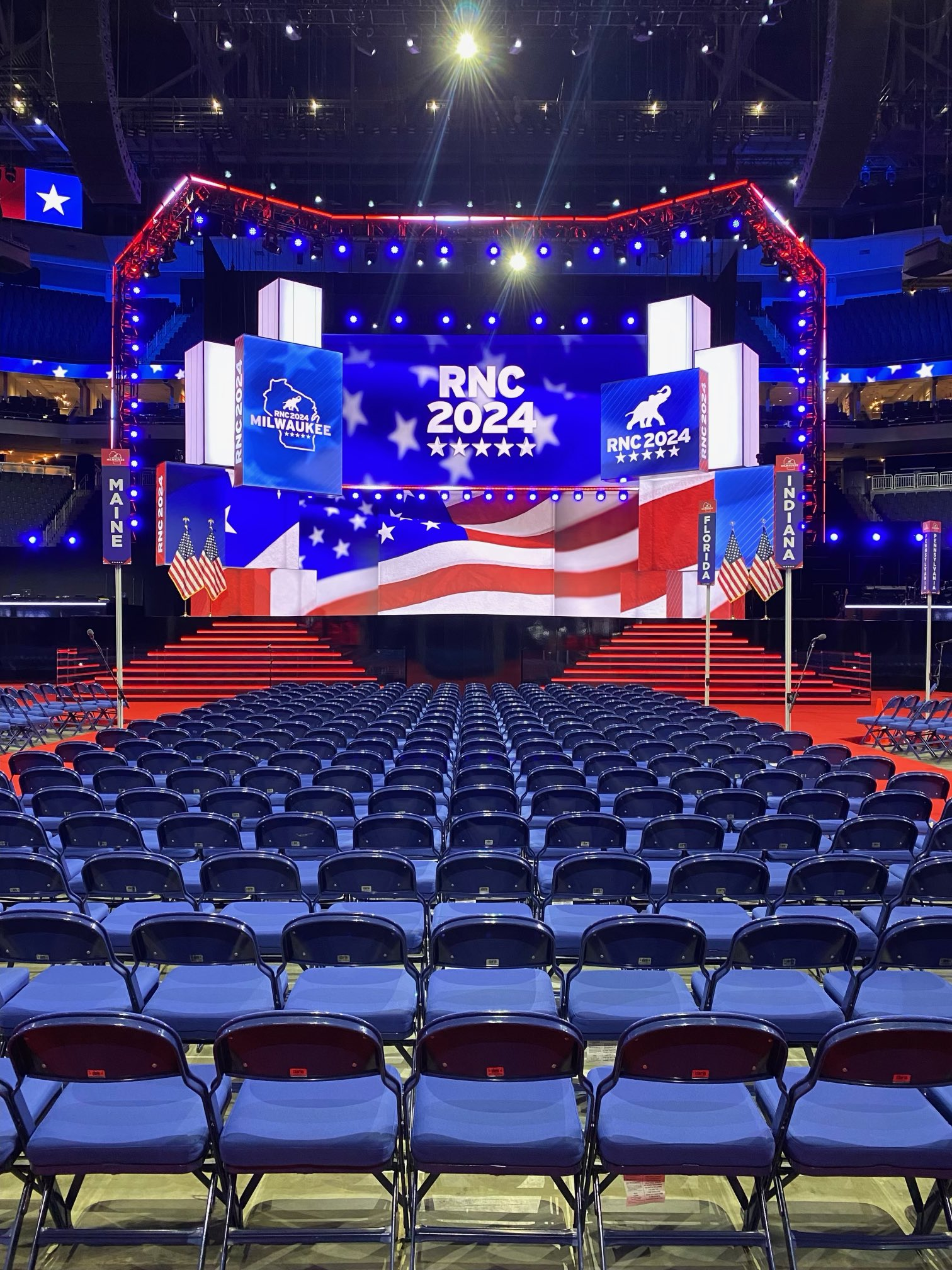
arena floor, setup for the convention

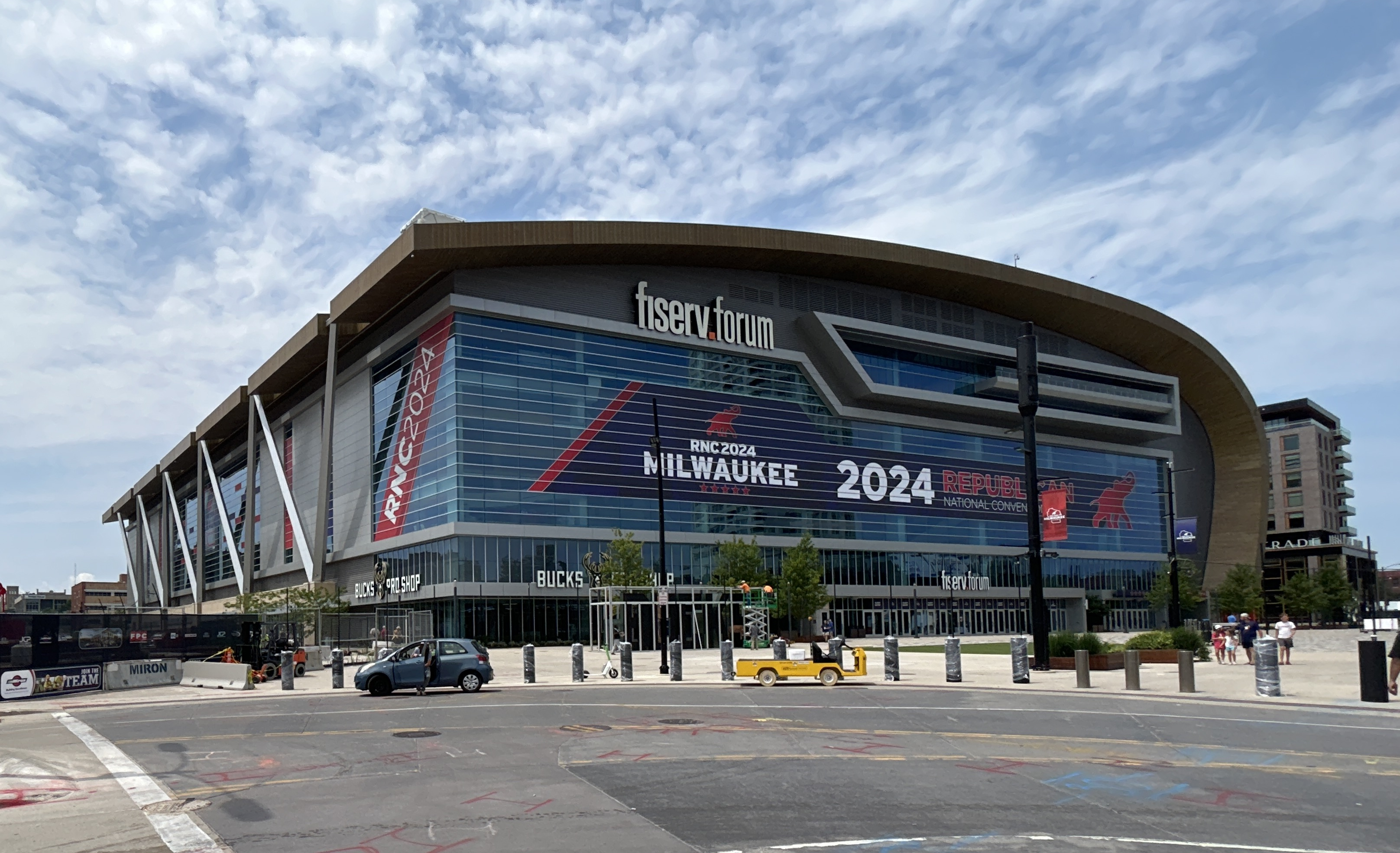
Exterior of the Fiserv Forum, as decorated in preparation for the convention

On June 3, 2024 (roughly six weeks prior to the start of the convention), the Republicans were formally handed use of the arena so that they could begin converting the arena to host the convention hall. Work commenced at 8 AM CST. The convention work (setup and dismantling) means that the Fiserv Forum has been rendered unable to host other events from then until mid-July. Per Kush Desai (the convention's deputy communications director), thousands of workers were involved in the conversion. The conversion was budgeted to cost millions of dollars.

A large stage has been constructed for the main speeches of the convention to take place on. During preparations, Desai described the stage as "a mammoth stage." The stage is 1,560 square feet (145 m^{2}) in size and has a backdrop with 1,200 high-density LED panels measuring 24 feet (7.3 m) in height and 60 feet (18 m) in width. The arena has been laid out in with the stage perpendicular to what are the sidelines when the arena is used for basketball and ice hockey. The arena floor will seat delegates in front of the stage.

The arena has been adorned with decoration that replaces the arena's usual green-and-cream (Milwaukee Bucks team color) accents, replacing those colors with c with red, white, and blue accents (the colors of the Flag of the United States) and the logo of the convention. Television broadcast booths have been constructed inside of the arena. Other work included constructing risers for media to utilize, as well as moving and retracting sections of seating. The arena has a capacity that seats 17,385 for basketball games, and it has not been altered to increase its capacity. The individuals granted access to the arena during the convention will primarily be delegates, alternate delegates, officials, invited guests, and news media.

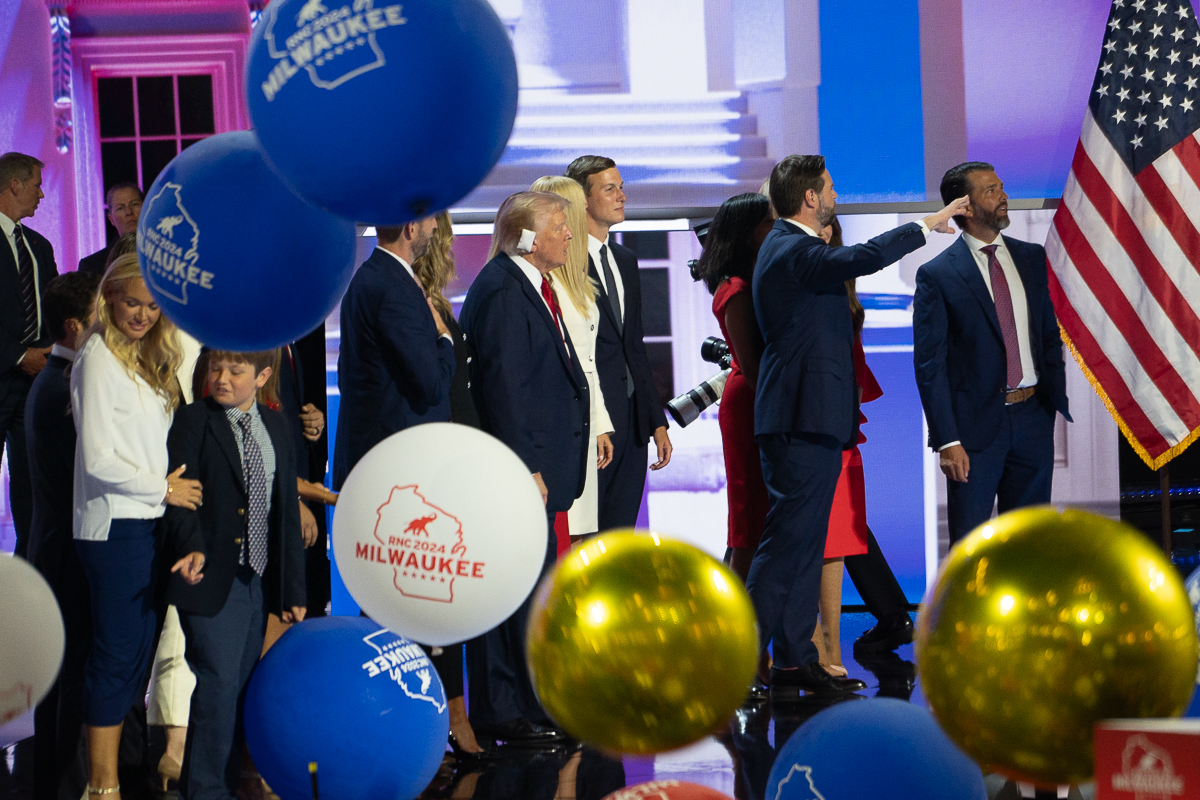
Nominees Trump and Vance and their families stand on stage during the balloon drop

Logistics for the convention-closing balloon drop were overseen by Treb Heining, who had similarly produced the balloons drops at every Republican National Convention since 1988 (with exception of the 2020 convention, which lacked a balloon drop due to COVID-19 pandemic downscaling). Heining also produced the balloon drop for the Democratic National Convention in 2024. The balloon drop featured approximately 100,000 balloons, and students from Milwaukee Public Schools assisted with the labor of preparing the balloons.

== Venues for secondary official convention events ==
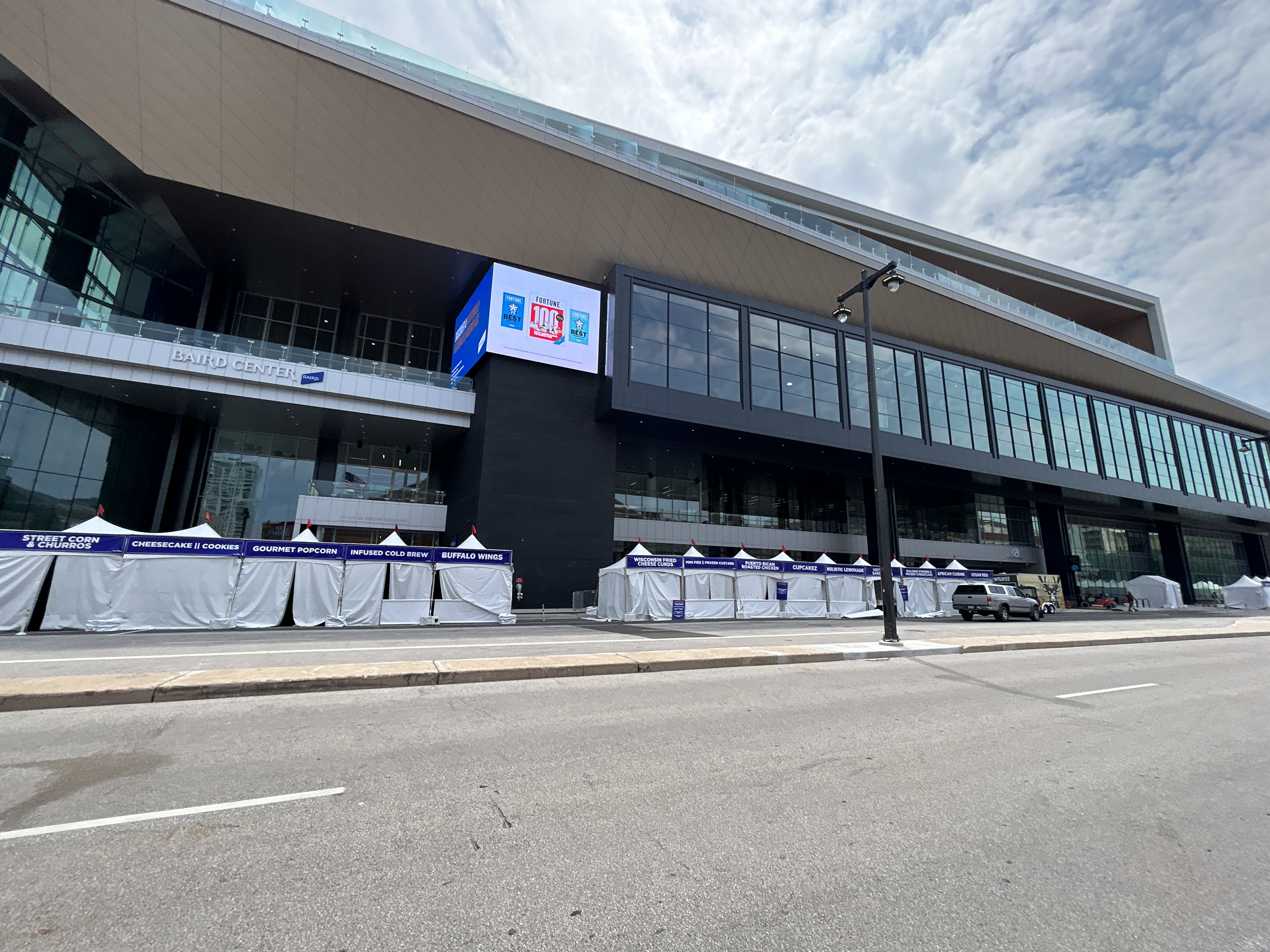
Baird Center's northern expansion, photographed during convention preparations

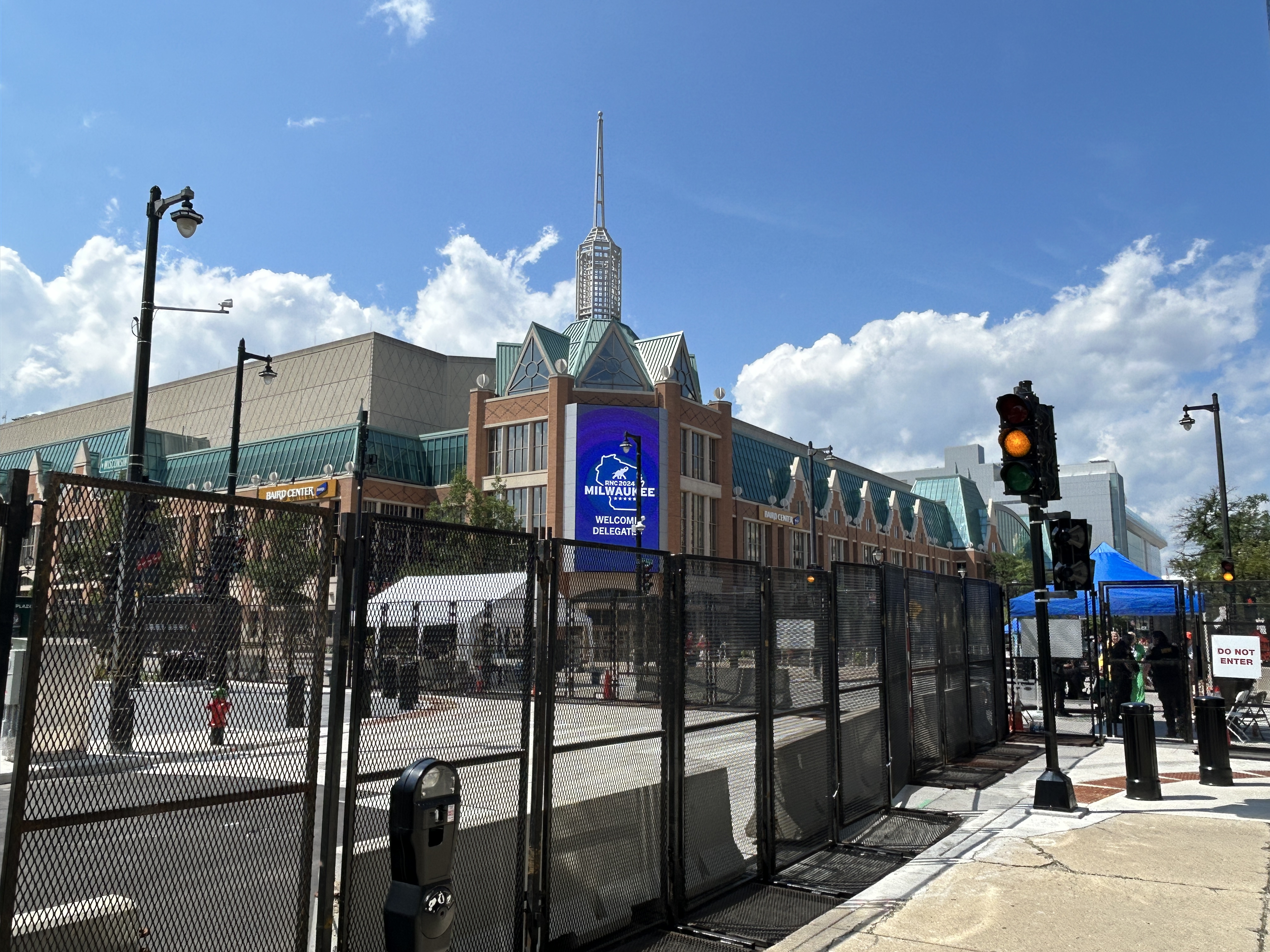
Baird Center's southern entrance, photographed during the convention

The Baird Center convention center (near to the Fiserv Forum, and inside the "hard" security zone) and an adjacent segment of Kilbourne Avenue were the location "Convention Fest" each afternoon of the convention. This was an event at which 100 local vendors demonstrated their products to convention attendees. Baird Center had only months before the convention finished construction on a new north expansion. An additional portion of Convention Fest was held at Père Marquette Park, with the park's use as a space for the event being a change to plans announced only days prior to the start of the convention. Winning Team Publishing organized book signings at the Convention Fest by Peter Navarro, Donald Trump Jr., Kari Lake, Marjorie Taylor Greene. Convention fest also featured an events stage, where afternoon programming was organized by the America First Policy Institute and America First Works. Additionally, ballroom C of the Baird Center was used for daily afternoon "grassroots training sessions" organized by the Republican National Committee. The Milwaukee Historical Society building was also utilized for official convention events.

On the evening of July 14, an expected crowd of 15,000 roughly invited guests and convention delegates attended the "Red, White, and Brew" welcome party at the Henry Maier Festival Park. This was an official pre-convention event organized by the host committee. Scheduled to perform was musician Trace Adkins.

The Republican Party organized daily watch parties at the Drink Wisconsinbly Pub.

The state delegations to the convention have organized their own events (such as banquets) at various venues. The Republican National Committee's southern region reserved the American Family Field baseball stadium for an event on July 17. The Utah state party organized a welcome reception at the Historic Pabst Brewery on July 14. The New Hampshire state party organized a welcome and organizing event for its delegates, held the morning of July 15 in the Maple Ballroom of the Timber Lodge Resort in Lake Geneva, Wisconsin. On July 16 and 17, the New Hampshire state party organized a multi-state breakfast and speaking program at the Grand Geneva in Lake Geneva, with their July 16 event being jointly organized with the Arkansas state party. On each day of the convention, the Louisiana delegation hosted both breakfasts and evening receptions at the Crowne Plaza Milwaukee South. Marcus Center was utilized for event hosted by the Virginia delegation on July 16. The Harley-Davidson Museum was utilized for numerous state party events.The Utah state party organized an event there on July 16 for "western states" Republicans themed as "BBG, Bikes, Blues". The Utah State Party organized a July 15 luncheon at Whirly Ball in Brookfield and a July 17 luncheon at the Hubbard Park Lodge. The "Northeast Region" state parties organized a private concert there on July 19, which was advertised as the "Hogs and Dogs Concert featuring former ambassador Scott Brown and the Diplomats Band". On July 18, the Washington state delegation hosted a lunch event there. Several locations held state delegation luncheons on convention days at restaurants and breweries in the city. The Georgia state party partnered with the Black Mayors Association to host a July 16 event at the Iron Horse Hotel honoring Black delegates. On July 15, the North Carolina state party held a breakfast for its delegation in Venue 3 at the 3rd Street Market Hall. On July 18, the state parties of South Carolina, New Hampshire, and Nevada held an afternoon "Early Primary State Reception" at the Red, White, and Blue Bar. The California delegation organized several events, a welcome gathering at Villa Terrace, including breakfasts at their hotel, a luncheon at the Harley Davidson Museum, and an afterparties at locations such at the Grain Exchange space at the Mackie Building.

A breakfast event hosted by the Pennsylvania state party featured remarks by UK politician Liz Truss (who had served a short and highly unsuccessful stint as UK prime minister in 2022). Her remarks, included mention of having recently purchased a shower head shaped like the Liberty Bell (a symbol of the United States' independence from the British).

== Media and broadcast facilities ==
Modern United States major party presidential nominating conventions are extensively covered by the news media, and have their evening sessions are carried by many broadcasters. Consequentially, the convention requires significant media space.

=== Facilities inside of the Fiserv Forum ===
Inside of the arena bowl of the Fiserv Forum, broadcast booths were constructed and risers were installed for use by media. ABC News; CBS News; NBC News and MSNBC; Fox News; CNN; and PBS News were among the broadcasters that erected broadcast booths in skyboxes inside of the Fiserv Forum. Additionally, Fox News erected three television sets in portions of the arena's concourse.

=== Media row ===
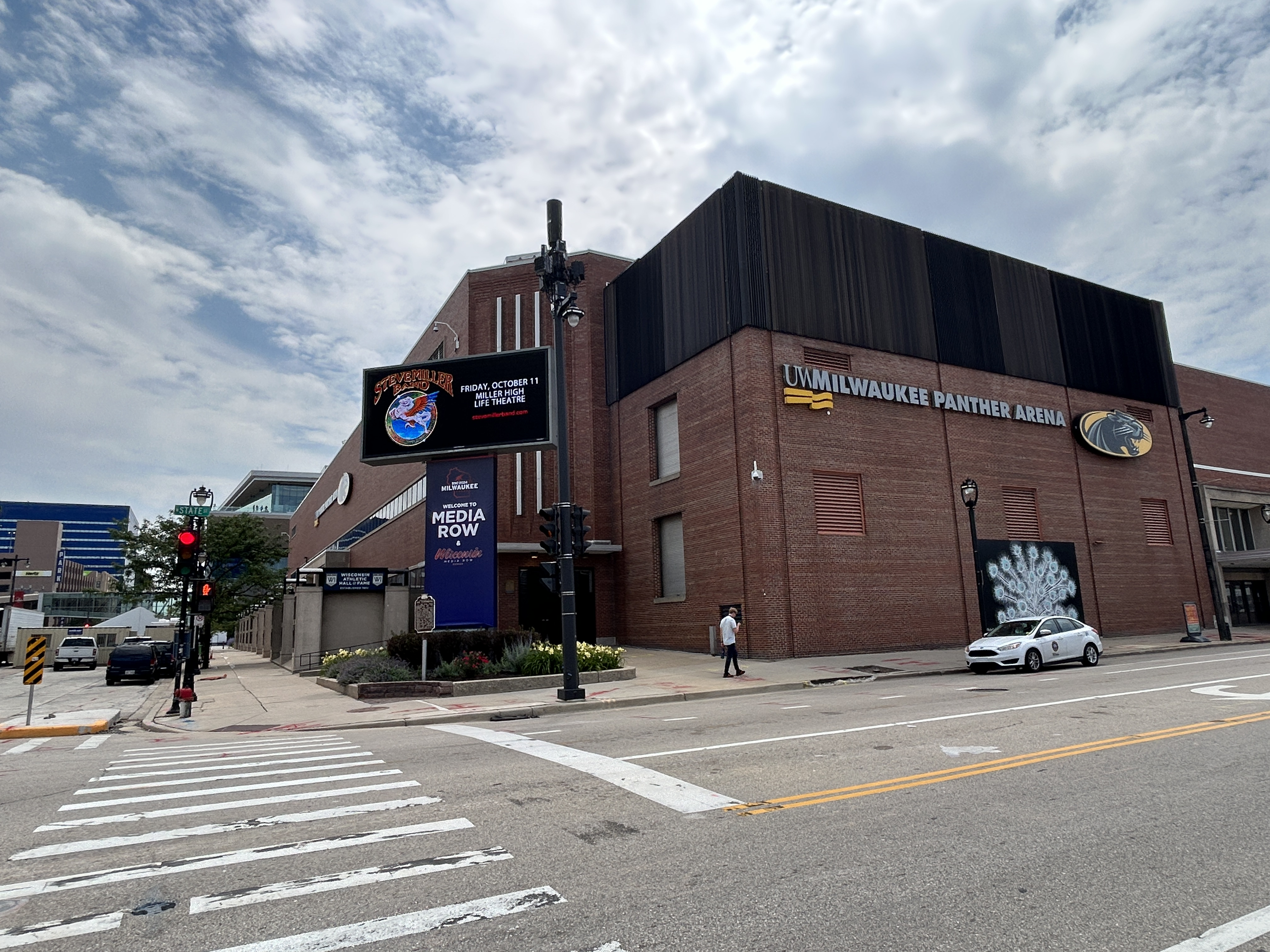
UW–Milwaukee Panther Arena (which served as "Media Row"), photographed during convention preparations

Due to limited room inside of the Fiserv Forum, media workspace will also be housed in two nearby venues inside of the "hard" security zone: the Baird Center and the UW–Milwaukee Panther Arena.

The UW-Milwaukee Panther Arena hosted additional news media in what was officially dubbed "Media Row". A portion of this was branded "Wisconsin Media Row" and featured numerous local news organizations.

=== CNN-Politico Grill ===
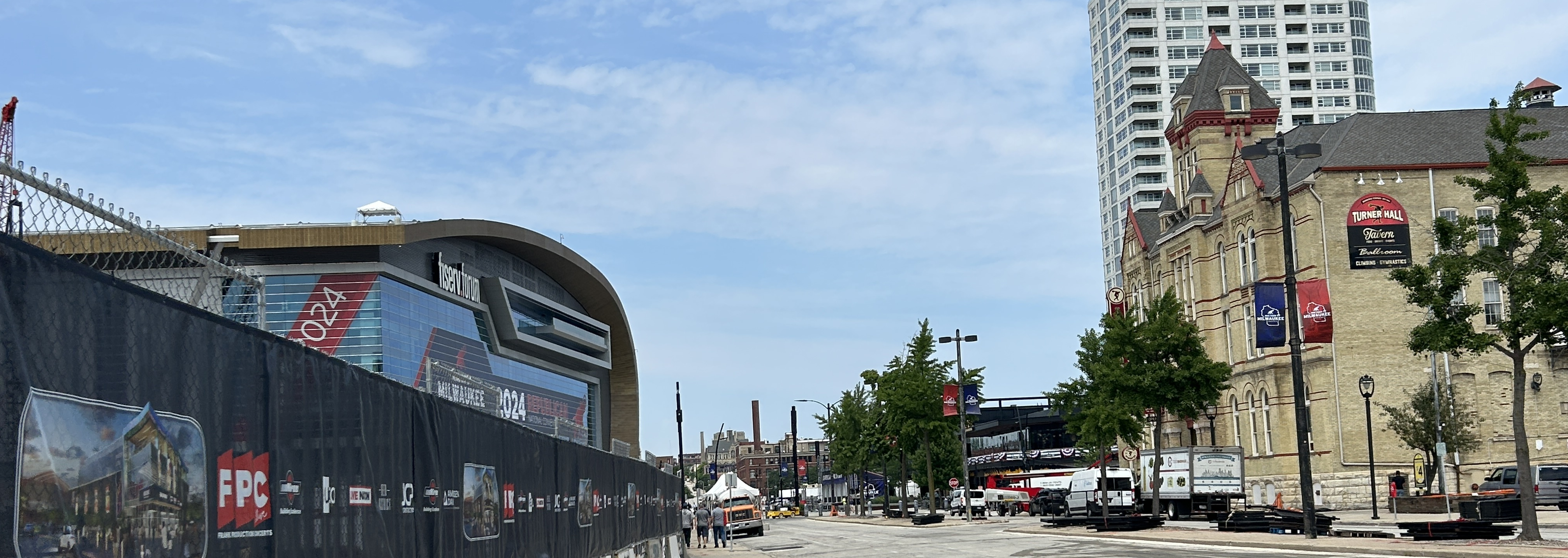
Fiserv Forum (left) and Turner Hall (right) during preparations

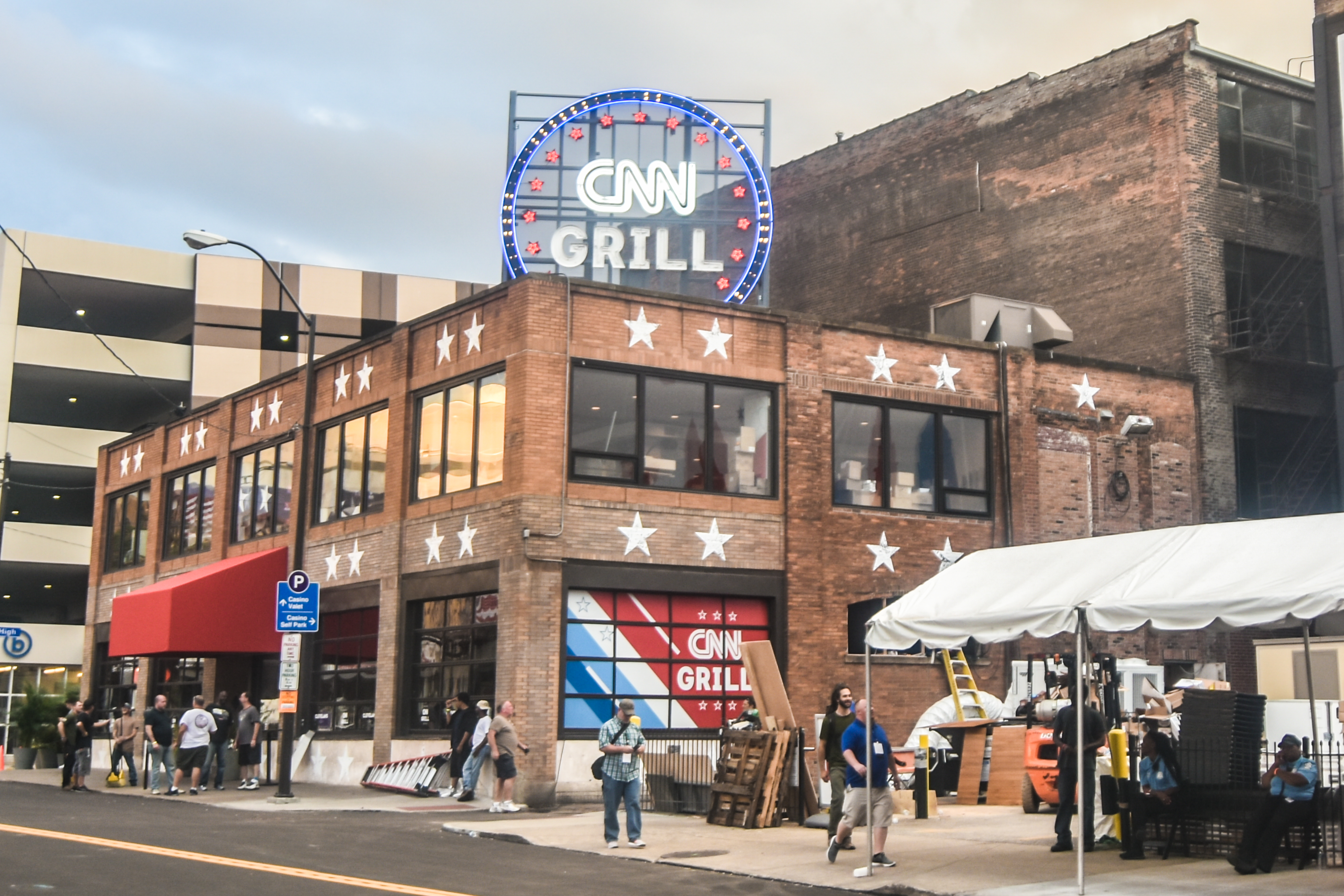
2016 RNC's CNN Grill

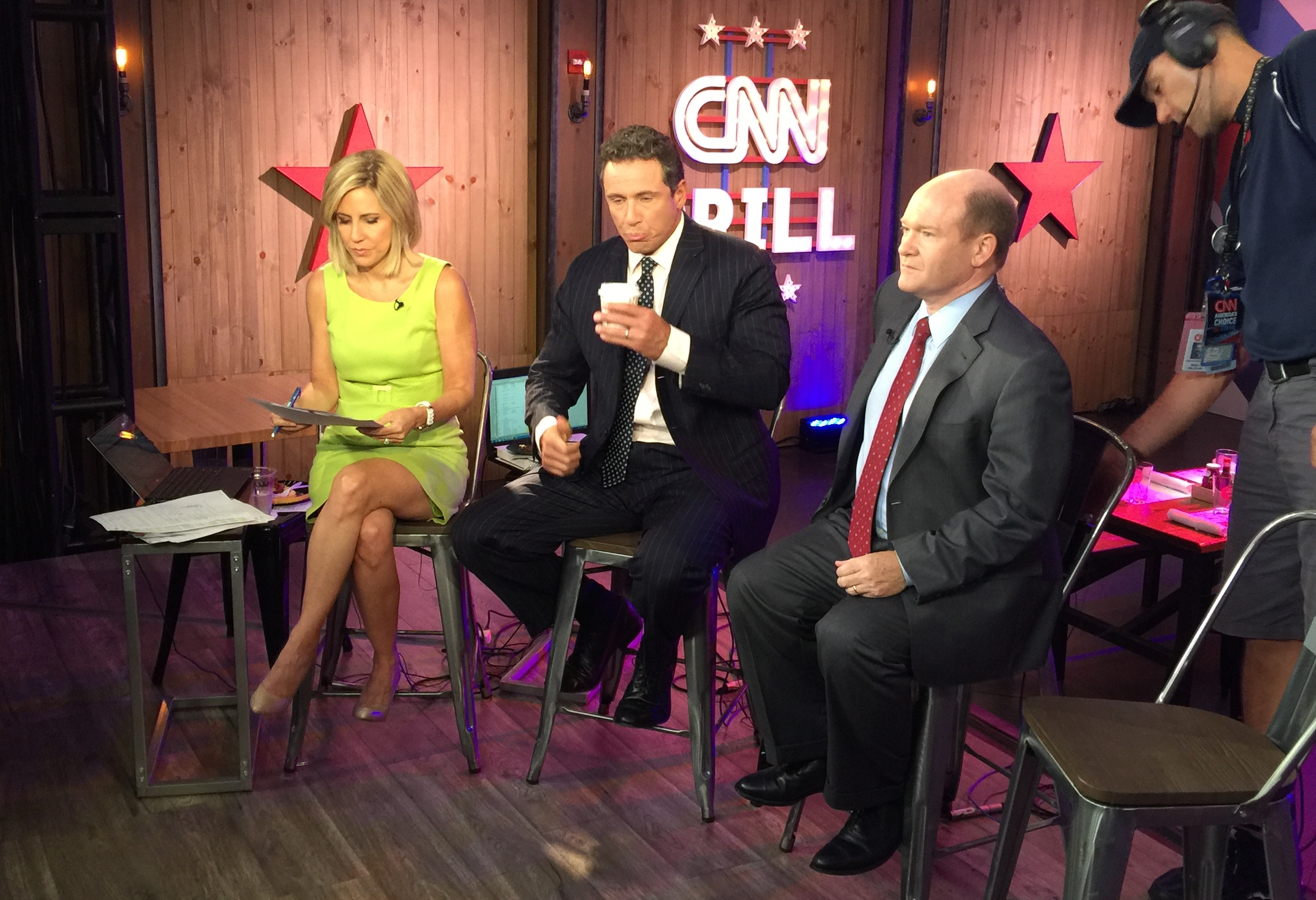
Filming at 2016 DNC's CNN Grill

Turner Hall served as the location of the CNN-Politico Grill. CNN had created similar temporary CNN Grill setups at earlier presidential conventions.

CNN revived the CNN Grill pop-up restaurant and broadcast studio concept that they had used at earlier in-person presidential nominating conventions, this time partnering with Politico to create the CNN-Politico Grill inside Turner Hall, near the Fiserv Forum. This was located inside of the convention's "hard" security zone Prior to the COVID-19 pandemic causing the 2020 Democratic National Convention to become virtual, CNN had intended to use the same venue as a CNN Grill for that convention.

=== Fox News broadcast set at GATHER ===
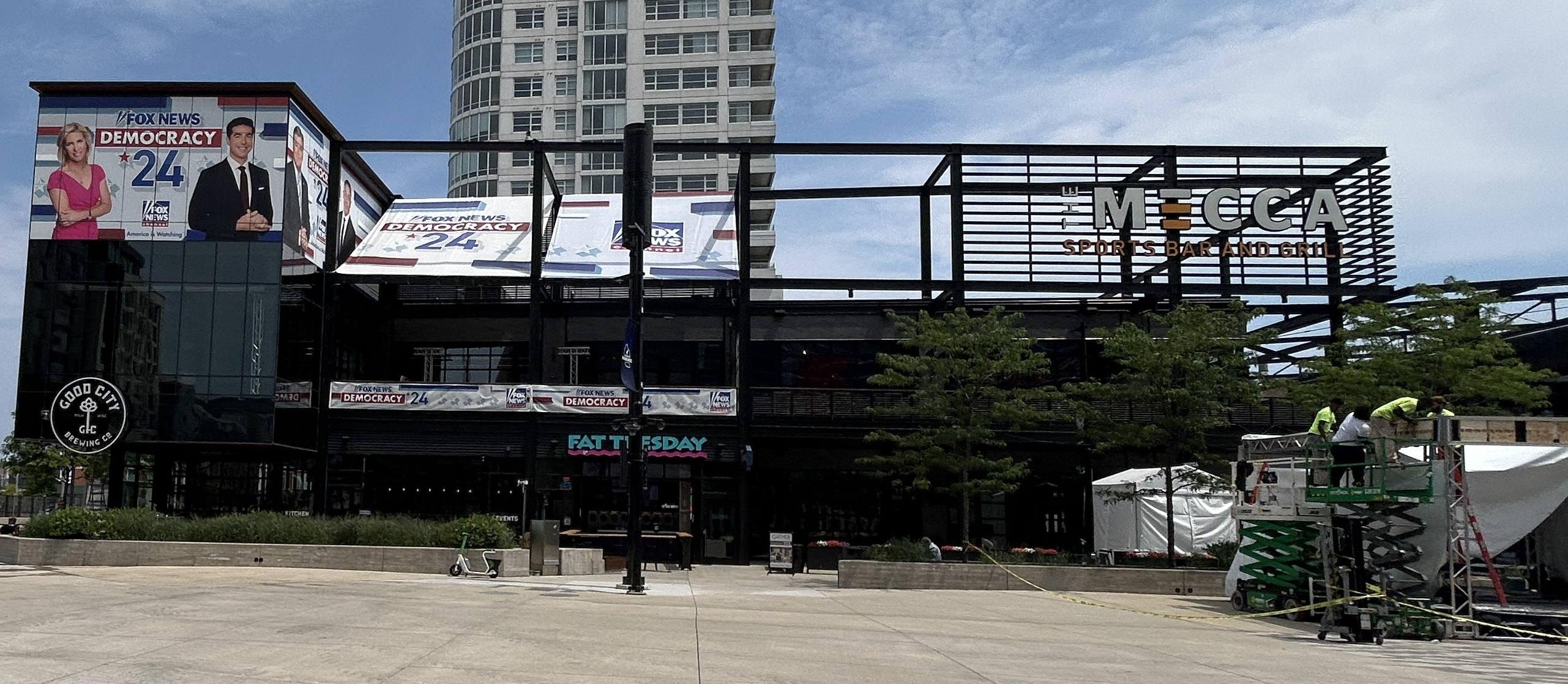
GATHER amid preparations for its use by Fox News

In addition to its sets inside the Fiserv Forum, Fox News erected a filming site at the GATHER event space in the Deer District, adjacent to the Fiserv Forum. This was located inside of the convention's "hard" security zone.

For the first time in its years of convention coverage, Fox News did not make use of a mobile production unit on-site in the host city. Instead, it handled its convention coverage production from the control room at its New York City studio.

=== Other media facilities ===
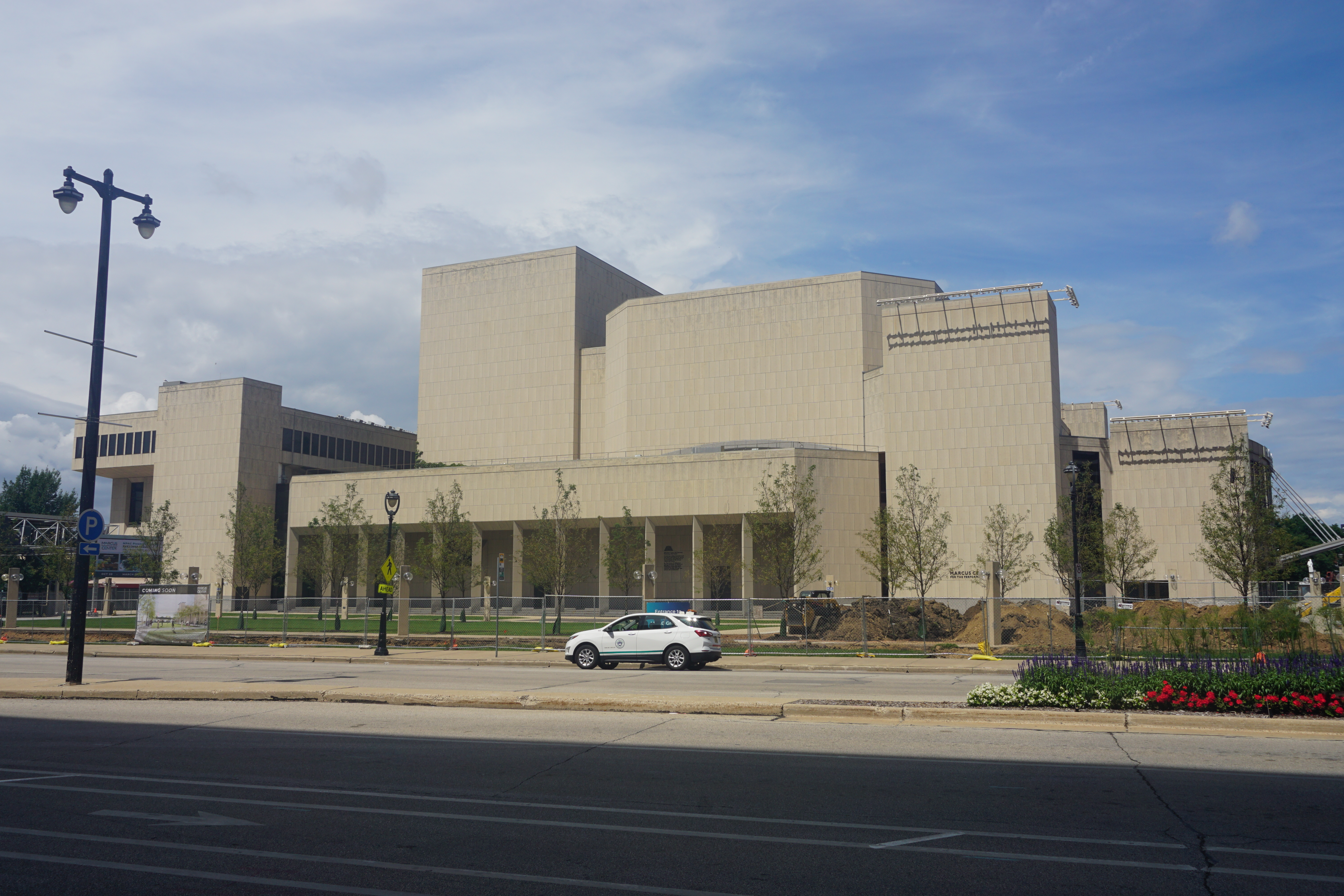
Marcus Center (photographed in 2022) was intended to be the filming site for episodes of Comedy Central's The Daily Show during the convention

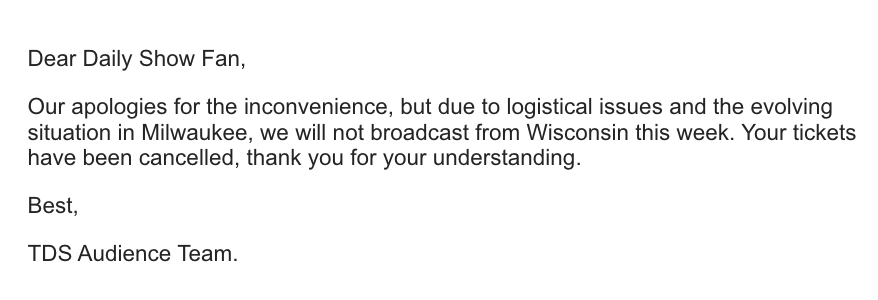
Email notifying a ticketholder of The Daily Show's cancelation of filming in Milwaukee

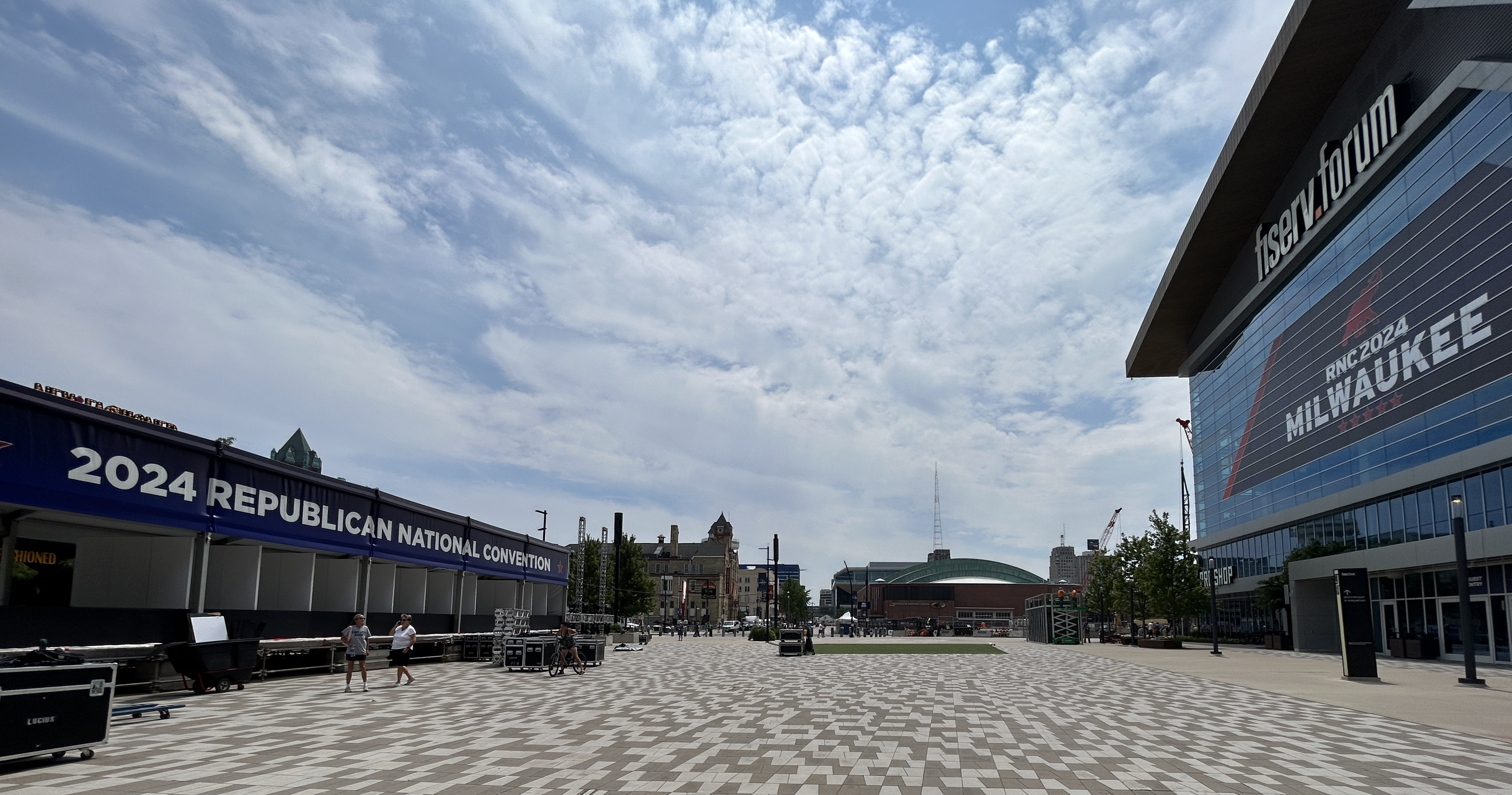
Broadcast platform (left) being built outside of the main entrances to the Fiserv Forum (right). Turner Hall and the UW–Milwaukee Panther Arena are visible in the distance

Comedy Central's The Daily Show had been scheduled to film episodes for each day of the convention at Milwaukee's Marcus Center as part of its Indecision 2024 election coverage. However, on the eve of the convention it was announced that these plans had been canceled last-minute and that The Daily Show would air no July 15 episode while filming episodes for the subsequent convention dates from its studios in New York City. This was due to safety concerns in light of the assassination attempt at Trump's July 13 rally. On the Daily Show's July 16 broadcast, host Jon Stewart claimed that the reason for cancelation was the Marcus Center being moved from the "soft" security perimeter to the "hard security perimeter". However, in actuality, the Marcus Center is inside neither security perimeter –though there had been the potential at the time Comedy Central cancelled its plan that the security perimeters might be expanded to encompass the venue.

C-SPAN used a production studio located in the East Town area of Milwaukee. Marquette University (whose campus is located relatively close to the Fiserv Forum) made its campus' outdoor spaces available for media to use as a filming location.

In an arrangement that is unusual for coverage of a major party convention by a major American broadcaster, the anchors for MSNBC's broadcast of the convention did not travel to the convention host city. Instead, their coverage was filmed at the channel's New York City studios, with a digital backdrop behind the anchors providing the false visual impression that they were in Milwaukee. Their broadcast made only occasional mentions that it was being recorded from the network's New York City studios. While its main anchors were filmed remote from the convention city, the network did send some reporters to Milwaukee for supplementary on-the-ground coverage, and journalists from its corporate sibling NBC News were also placed in Milwaukee during the convention.

== Staging of related events by outside organizations ==
Political groups, interest groups, corporations, and other organizations hosted related events in Milwaukee during the convention at various venues around the city. Several event organizers have scheduled "after party" events during the nights of the convention.

Comedy Central (whose The Daily Show program had originally planned to film in the city during the convention) had organized an event that was to be held on the eve of the convention at Cathedral Square Park and facilitate voter registration and dog adoption. The event, "InDogCision 2024", was to be co-hosted with HeadCount and the Milwaukee Area Domestic Animal Control Commission. However, this event was canceled on short notice.

The Historic Pabst Brewery was the site of several events. This included events organized by the Harvard Kennedy School Institute of Politics, such as a July 16 reception and panel conversation in the complex's Barley Room, and a July 17 "Youth Votefest" in the complex's Blue Ribbon Hall. It also included a July 16 women's leadership event organized by the groups Independent Women's Voice RightNow in the complex's Best Place events space.

On July 14, the Marquette Law School Poll sponsored a lecture on Marquette University's campus. On July 16, the Georgetown Institute of Politics and Public Service organized an event with Chris LaCivita at the restraurant Bacchus. The Association for Corporate Growth organized a July 16 panel discussion at the Milwaukee Athletic Club. The International Republican Institute and U.S. Global Leadership Coalition held a July 16 event at the Grand Hall in the headquarters of Northwestern Mutual. The European Union organized an event called "Transatlantic Approaches to China" in the same space at a different time that same day. The European Union also organized a July 17 "Europe Night" event at the Harley Davidson Museum. The Hispanic Leadership Coalition held a reception at the Iron Horse Hotel on July 18. The National Defense Political Action Committee held a July 15 event at AJ Bombers Bar & Restaurant. The Texas Public Policy Foundation and the American Cornerstone Institute jointly organized a July 16 social function at The Grain Exchange at the Mackie Building. The Bradley Symphony Center was used for multiple events. On July 15, The Heritage Foundation hosted a "policy fest" event at the venue. On July 15, Moms for Liberty held a "town hall event" at the venue. The Heritage Foundation also organized a July social event held at Uncle Buck's restaurant.Pilot Project Brewing was the location of multiple events organized by outside groups, including an event hosted by APIAVote on July 15 and an event on July 16 hosted by AT&T to honor the convention's chairwoman (Anne Hathaway). All In Together held an event about the effects of artificial intelligence on July 15 at the Northern Lights Event Venue, with Microsoft serving as a presenting sponsor. American Global Strategies hosted a July 15 reception at Third Coast provisions. The National Italian American Foundation organized a July 15 "Recepetion honoring the Italian American Commitment to Public Service" held at the Calderone Club. The National Federation of Republican Women organized a July 16 lunch at the Pfister Hotel, featuring Arkansas Governor Sarah Sanders as its main speaker. The American Principles Project and Orange County Choppers co-organized a "Freedom Riders" motorcyclists event at the Drink Wisconsibly Pub on July 16. On July 17, Turning Point USA held an evening event at The New Fashioned.

The Hilton Milwaukee City Center was the location of a "nomination day prayer breakfast" organized by Capitol Ministries. The Pfister Hotel was the location of a prayer breakfast held the same day by the Faith and Freedom Coalition. The U.S. Concealed Carry Association held an event at the Pfister Hotel featuring Chris LaCivita and other on July 16. The American Tomorrow Project and the Black Conservatives Federation each held parties at the Oak Barrell Public House at different times of the day at on July 17. Red, White, and Blue Bar was the location of events organized by groups such as Serbs for Trump, GOP Jamboree. Red Rock Saloon was the location of an event hosted by Polaris National Security. The Edison was the location an event events hosted by AAC/The DonorBureau St. James 1868 was the location of a party by the Association of Equipment Manufacturers on July 16. Blockchain and cryto currency related events were held, including one on July 17 featuring Congressman Bryan Steil as its main speaker, and another held at Bavette La Boucherie on July 16. Malchine Farms was the location of the "Great American Farm Fair", an event organized by the GOP Farm Committee and Farmers & Ranchers for Trump. The New York chapter of Young Republicans held a July 16 party at Shakers' Cigar Bar.

The Mitchell Park Domes was the location of a reception jointly organized by the Conservative Climate Foundation, Clearpath, American Conservation Coalition and CRES Forum on July 16. Discovery World was the location of a late-evening party also hosted jointly by the Conservative Climate Foundation and the American Conservative Coalition. The American Jewish Committee organized a panel discussion related to the Gaza War, held in Milwaukee on July 16. Events were also hosted in Milwaukee by the Republican Jewish Coalition and the Republican National Lawyers Association.

Several movie premieres and screenings were organized in Milwaukee during the convention. Theocracy of Terror: Murder, Oppression & The Rise of Iran’s Political Regime, a documentary produced by Secure America Now, was premiered at Venue 3 in the 3rd Street Market Hall on July 15. Trump’s Rescue Mission: Saving America, a film produced by Citizens United Productions was premiered at the Miller High Life Theatre on July 17. The producers of the biopic Reagan organized screenings of the film both at the Pfister Hotel and in the Regency Ballroom at the Hilton Milwaukee City Center. Real America's Voice held a July 18 screening of Government Gangsters at the Miller High Life Theatre.

== Local transit ==
=== Road closures and parking restrictions ===
Numerous temporary road closures were caused by the convention, some going into effect as early as July 11.

Some convention-related parking restrictions began to go into effect on July 5, and some are expected to run through July 21.

=== Public transit ===
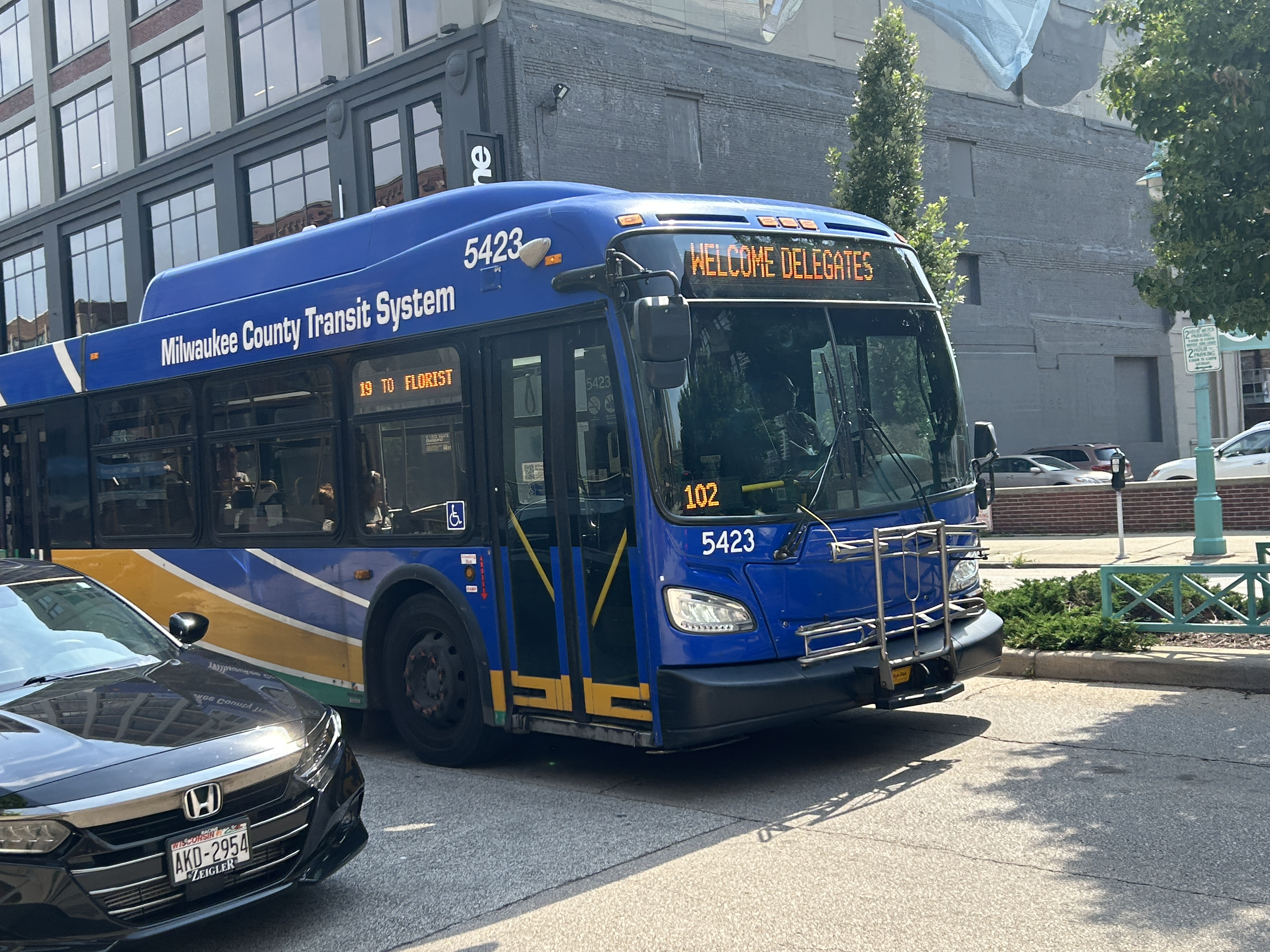
Milwaukee County Transit System bus photographed in the Historic Third Ward during the convention, with an LED monitor reading "welcome delegates"

The Milwaukee County Transit System (MCTS) anticipated increased traffic and delays across its entire system during the convention.

Fourteen MCTS routes that normally traveled through the area occupied by the security perimeter were rerouted, with some stops in the security perimeter being supplanted by temporary stops outside of it. Among the routes required to be rerouted was the CONNECT1 bus rapid transit route. The majority of these routes were rerouted through 12th, Walnut, and Milwaukee streets. Rerouting was scheduled to start as early as July 11. MCTS also has expected service interruptions for its Transit Plus paratransit service. However, unlike vehicles service scheduled bus routes, paratransit vans are permitted to enter vehicle screening areas for scheduled drop-offs (with riders being subject to security screenings).

During the convention, The Hop (Milwaukee's modern streetcar system) operated in its a temporary "Festival Line" ("F–Line") service in which all trains served all stations. This service combined the system's two lines ("M–Line" and "L–Line") into a single line. "Festival Line" service had begun in June ahead of Summerfest in order to increase service to the Lakefront stop at The Couture (the nearest stop to the north gate of Henry Maier Festival Park) and in hopes of making the system less confusing to festival visitors. It had initially been announced to end at the close of Summerfest. However, on July 11 it was announced that the "Festival Line" arrangement would continue until the end of the summer in order to make the festival grounds more accessible for attendees of other events held there over the summer, meaning that this service was in effect during the convention.

=== Delegate transit ===
As is usual, the convention host committee was tasked with organizing transit to carry delegates. In April 2024, the host committee reported requiring 400 buses for convention transportation, primarily to be utilized in the transport of delegates.

== Air travel ==
=== Milwaukee Mitchell International Airport ===
The operators of Milwaukee Mitchell International Airport anticipated the handling of a large amount of convention travelers aboard both on commercial and private airplanes. Similarly to many other aspects of the convention, Milwaukee's experience in planning for a 2020 Democratic convention prior to the onset of the COVID-19 pandemic proved informative.

11,000 people per day were expected to use the airport during days of peak convention travel, as opposed to the typical 8,000 to 10,000 that the airport it handles most days. Rather than any drastic increase in passengers, airport officials instead anticipated that the airport's clientele would shift, with far less locals traveling through the airport around the time of the convention, and their patronage being largely supplanted by out-of-town convention travelers. The anticipated convention traffic was described as being only slightly more than the airport would carry during a typical spring break travel period. Peak arrival days were expected to be July 13–14 and peak departure days are anticipated to be July 19–20. To handle the convention traffic, the airport increased its staff, added "airport ambassadors" to aid travelers, and altered its procedures.

In order to handle increased demand, airlines increased the number of flights serving Milwaukee Mitchell International, and also arranged to use higher-capacity planes than it usually operated on its flights serving the airport (utilizing mainline jets rather than regional jets). For the days of convention arrival and departure, airlines such as United Airlines and American Airlines, increased the number of nonstop flights offered between Milwaukee and airports serving Dulles International Airport and Ronald Reagan Washington National Airport near Washington, D.C. (the political capital of the United States). There were an additional eight flights to these two on peak arrival days for the convention compared to the airport's usual direct connections with them. American Airlines is also utilizing higher-capacity aircraft on its services to Washington, D.C. than it normally uses. Additionally, to increase connection with New York City (the "news media capital" of the United States), United Airlines upgraded some of its flights to Newark Liberty International Airport from regional jets to larger mainline aircraft, and American Airlines added a nonstop flight between LaGuardia Airport.

United Airlines increased its number of flights serving Milwaukee around the time of the convention, adding 72 additional flights for a total of 280 fights to and from Milwaukee during the week of the convention. This amounted to 5,000 additional in seats available to passengers on United Airlines flights serving Milwaukee compared to normal operations (a 75% increase). This included increasing flights between Milwaukee Mitchell International and the United Airlines hubs at Chicago O'Hare International, Denver International, Dulles International, and George Bush Intercontinental Airport. United Airlines scheduled 72 additional flights between Milwaukee and Chicago O'Hare, Newark International, Denver International, Washington Dulles, and George Bush Intercontinental airports. In total, United Airlines alone scheduled more than 280 flights at Milwaukee General Mitchell during the week of the convention. United Airlines also scheduled the use of higher-capacity aircraft than it normally used on more than 20 round-trip direct flights serving Milwaukee, including some of those between Milwaukee and Chicago O'Hare as well as those between Milwaukee and Phoenix Sky Harbour International Airport.

Frontier Airlines scheduled additional nonstop flights between Milwaukee Raleigh-Durham International and Philadelphia International Airport beginning on May 16. Southwest Airlines added a direct flight between Milwaukee and San Diego International Airport. Spirit Airlines added a direct flight between Milwaukee and Dallas Love Field, which began service on July 11. Alaska Airlines increased its flight frequency between Milwaukee and Seattle–Tacoma International Airport from one per day to two. JetBlue began utilizing larger aircraft on its daily flights between Milwaukee and Boston Logan International Airport.

Year-round regularly scheduled American Airlines service between Milwaukee and Reagan International Washington National Airport was newly established in time for the convention, providing additional service between the two airports that were already connected by Southwest Airlines. The airport scheduled an advertising campaign at Washington National Airport ahead of the convention to encourage possible D.C.–based convention travelers (such as lobbyists, media figures, and delegates) who might travel through the airport to consider taking flights at Milwaukee Mitchell for the Republican National Convention instead of other airports in the region such as Chicago O'Hare.

Handling the vastly increased number of private jets was anticipated to be a much greater challenge than handling the anticipated increase in the number of commercial passengers. One challenging aspect was the unpredictability as to when private flights would arrive. The airport also anticipated a heavy simultaneous demand for such private aircraft departures soon after the convention closed (with private jet users likely to seek an expeditious exit from the city once convention activities concluded). More than 200 private jets were anticipated, with many private jet owners intending to park their jets at the airport for the entire course of the convention.

The convention required coordination between the airport and other airports, even those as far away as Madison, Wisconsin's Dane County Regional Airport and Grand Rapids, Michigan's Gerald R. Ford International Airport. Those airports would be used to provide security screening to private jets prior to their landing at Milwaukee Mitchell.

A new art installation was unveiled in the airport's terminal weeks prior to the convention. Several improvement projects instead of the airport's passenger terminal were accelerated in order to be completed in time for the convention, including the addition of a new retail shop, the addition of a Dunkin' Donuts in the D concourse, and the addition of new wayfinding signage and fresh carpeting.

"Patriotic" decor was overlaid on the airport during the convention. The Visit Milwaukee tourism organization arranged to place welcome banners at the airport, place volunteers at the airport, and have local musicians perform at the airport during the period in which convention goers would arrive.

Trump's aircraft landed at Michell International Airport on July 14.

On July 19 (the day after the close of the convention), expected to be the main day of departure for convention attendees, many flights were delayed or canceled due to tech outages resulting from the 2024 CrowdStrike-related IT outages.

=== Other airports ===
Chicago O'Hare was regarded to be an airport that some traveling to Milwaukee for the convention might utilize instead of Milwaukee Mitchell.

It was anticipated that some private jet traffic would be handled by airports other than Milwaukee Mitchell, including Lawrence J. Timmerman Airport and Waukesha County Airport. Waukesha County Airport underwent preparations to handle convention-related private jet traffic. A modest increase in private jet traffic was formally booked prior to the convention, with unknown number of additional private jets anticipated to land at the airport without prior reservations.

== Impact on museums and public events ==
While the Milwaukee Art Museum remained open during the convention (and Baird sponsored free admission during that period) many of the city's other significant museums were closed during the convention including the Milwaukee Public Museum, Betty Brinn Children's Museum, Discovery World. Additionally, ahead of the convention the Milwaukee Public Museum was impacted by preparations, which limited access to streets near it and also caused the temporary closure of its parking garage. Additionally, many weekly summertime events in the city were suspended the week of the convention, including Jazz in the Park and the MKE River Roundup Concert Series.

After the host committee pledged to contribute money to a fundraiser for the future completion of decorative lighting on the entirety of the Hoan Bridge, it was agreed that the existing decorative lighting on the bridge would be illuminated in red, white, and blue colors during the nights of the convention.

== Economic impact in the Milwaukee region ==
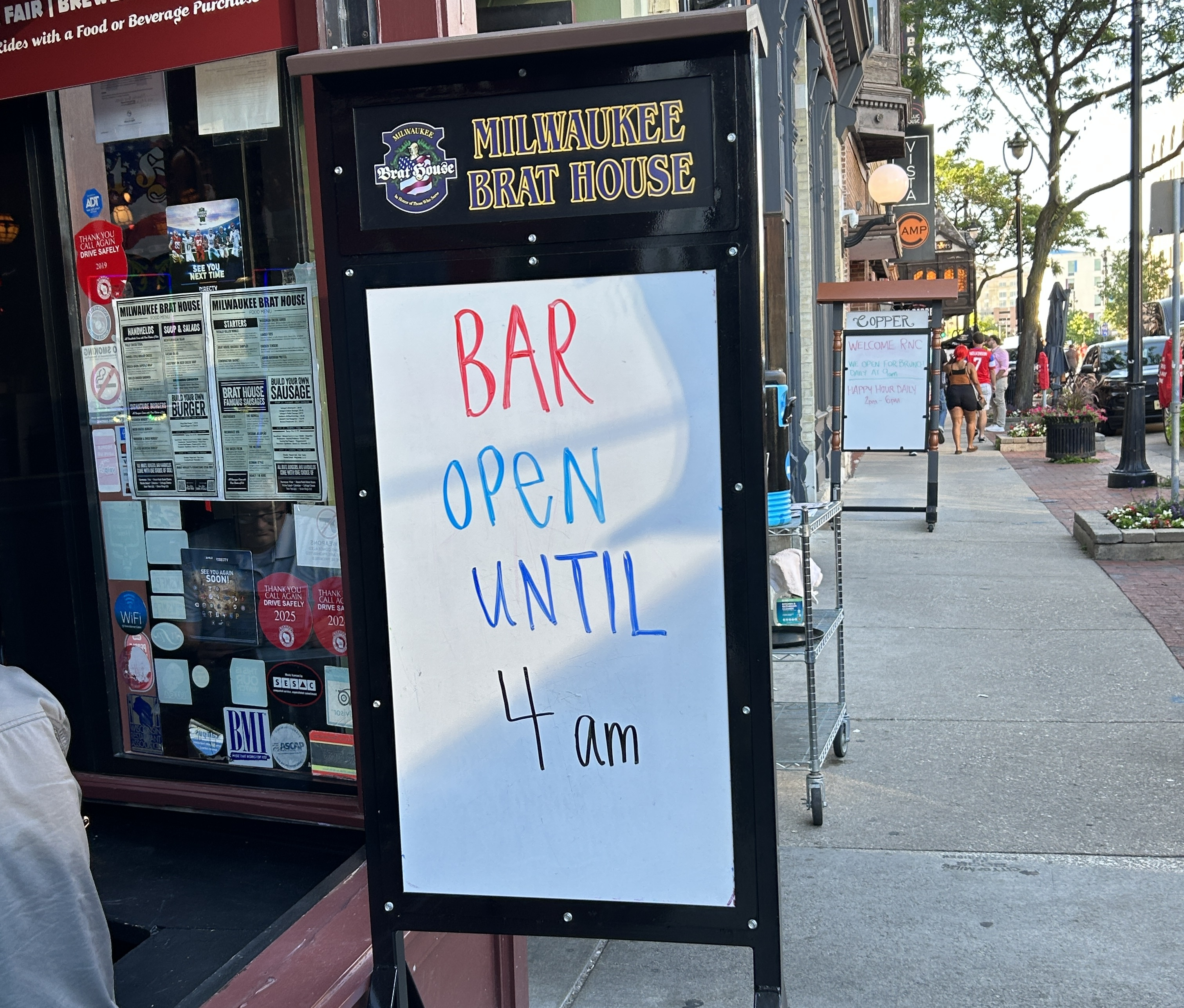
Sign outside of the Milwaukee Brat House during the convention advertising that its bar hours would extend until 4:00 AM

At the time Milwaukee was preparing to host, economic estimates were cited which projected that the convention could bring as much as $200 million in revenue to the region.

In his proposed state budget for 2024, Wisconsin Governor Evers included a provision that would extend the permitted hours of operation for southeast Wisconsin bars to 4:00 a.m. during the convention. State law in Wisconsin mandates that bars close at 2 a.m. on weekdays and 2:30 a.m. on weekends. In June 2023, the Wisconsin State Assembly passed a bill to accomplish such an extension of hours for bars during the convention. The Wisconsin Senate needed to pass the bill before the governor could sign it. The law made it to the governor's desk, and was signed by Evers on April 8. It allows for bars in fourteen Wisconsin counties to remain open until 4 AM a.m. during the convention (as opposed to laws normally requiring Wisconsin bars to close by 2 a.m. on weekdays). However, the governments of several municipalities in these counties opted out of this.

As early as April 2024, operators of many event venues restaurants in Milwaukee raised alarm at the lack of reservations they had received, raising fears that they would lose revenue during the convention. Chicago, the host of the 2024 Democratic convention had seen an extensive number of venues booked for its convention, while Milwaukee had not seen similar success with bookings for the Republican convention. 212 venues that signed memorandums of understanding with the convention organizers under which they would leave their venues available for convention-related events, waiting until April 1 to make those dates available to be booked for events unrelated to the convention. In turn, the venues were included on the host committee's official list of venues. However, by the time of the convention few of those venues received convention-related bookings.

Many premier event venues in Milwaukee failed to receive event bookings during the convention. The Pabst Theater Group (the operator of many venues in Milwaukee) noted that a majority of its venues had no events during the convention, including the Pabst Theater, Riverside Theater, Vivarium, and The Fitzgerald. Its owner criticized convention planners for having "overpromise[d] and underdeliver[ed]." Operators of other venues complained that the convention organizers failed to communicate with them. In the final weeks before the convention, several venues (including The Rave/Eagles Club) gave up on seeking convention-related events and began working to book non-related events such as concerts. After the start of the convention, many restaurants near the convention but outside of the security perimeter reported a lack of reservations and business.

Outside of direct economic impact during the convention, city leaders had also anticipated that the convention would bring beneficial media exposure to the city. Many convention visitors praised the city's hosting of the convention, and were quoted by media as having left with positive impressions of the city.

== See also ==
- Logistics of the 1952 Democratic and Republican National Conventions
- Logistics of the 2020 Democratic National Convention
