= Nevada's 10th Senate district =

American legislative district

Nevada's 10th State Senate district
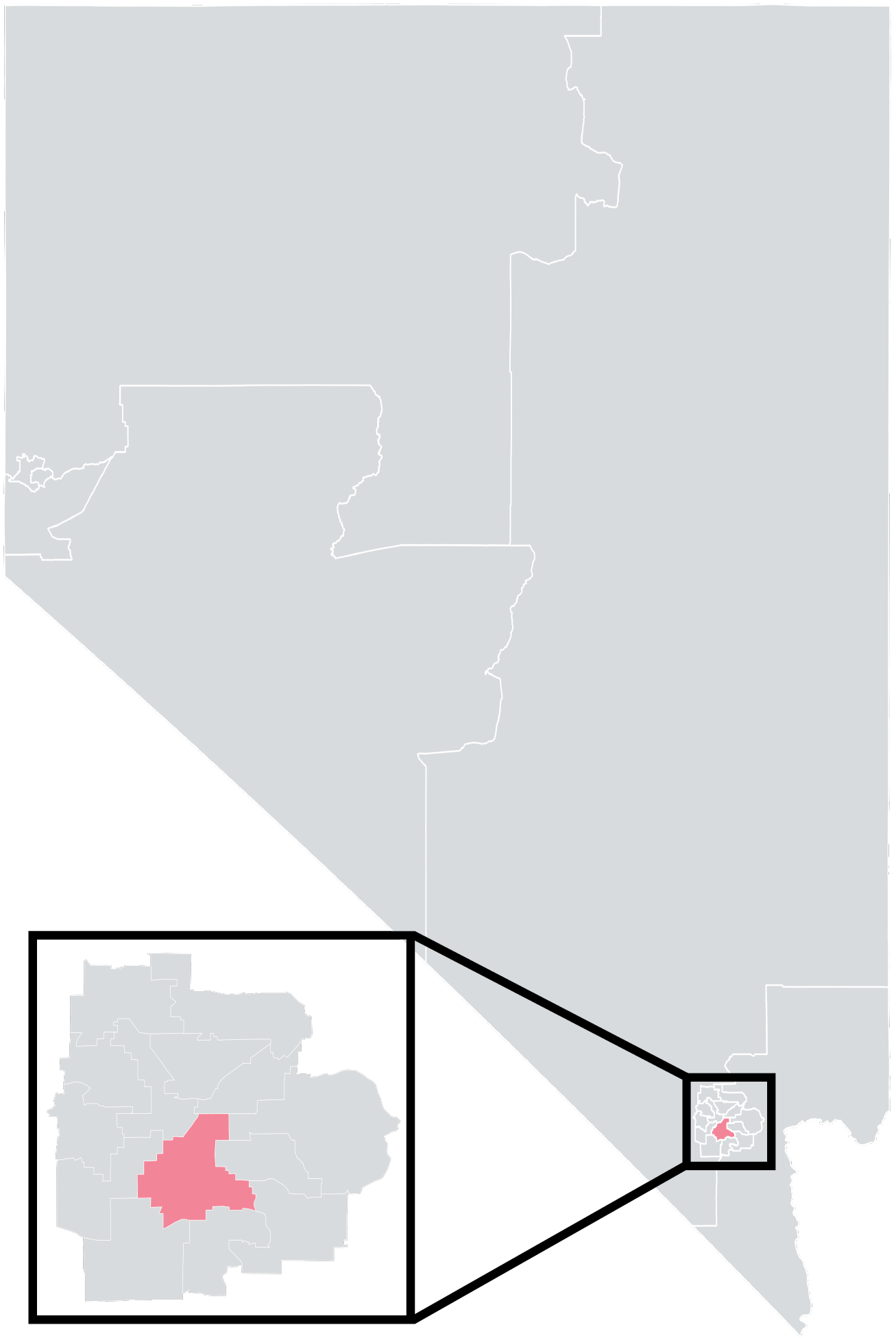
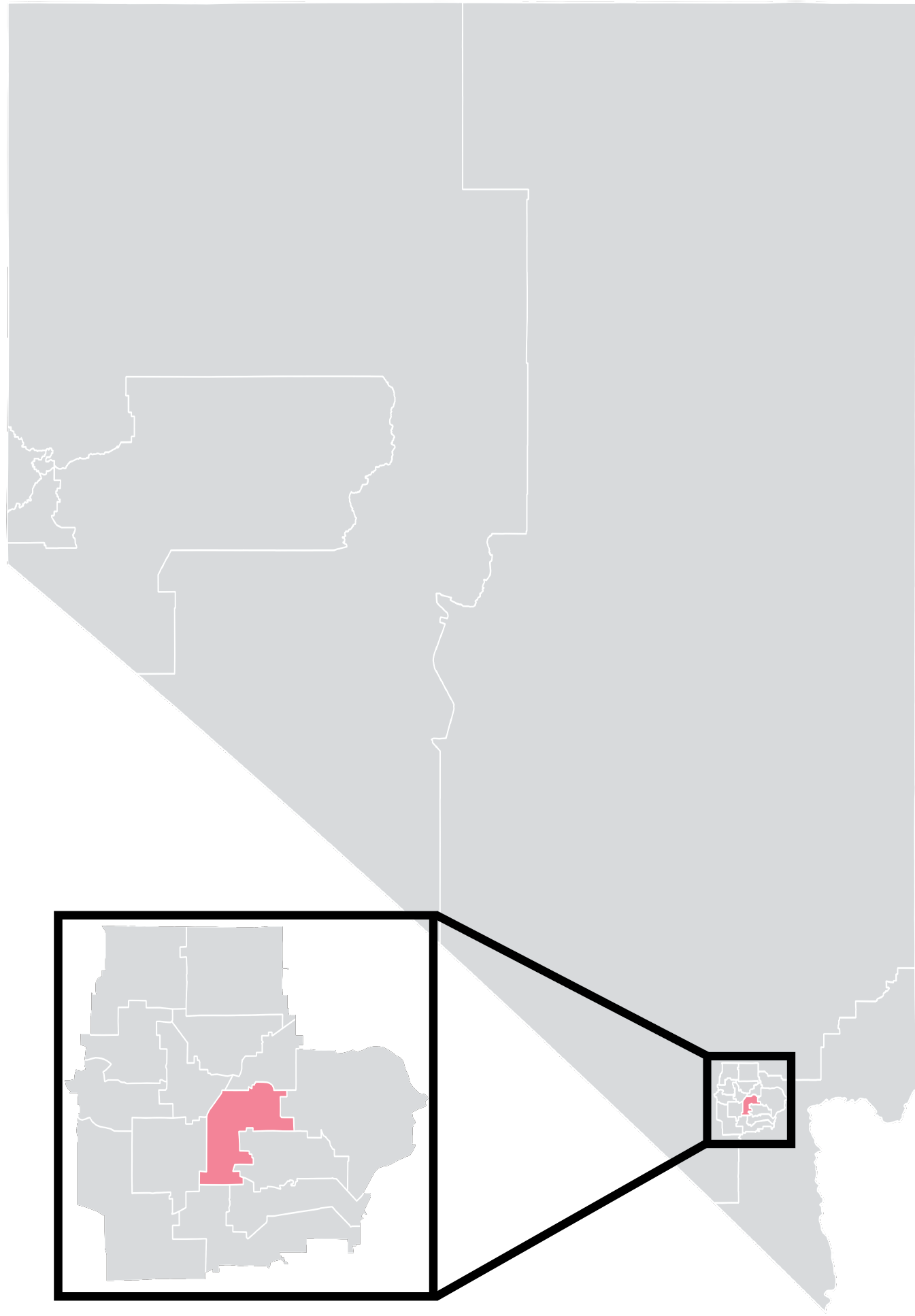
Senator
Fabian Doñate; D–Las Vegas
- Registration: 53.7% Democratic; 22.6% Republican; 16.8% No party preference
- Demographics: 30% White; 11% Black; 47% Hispanic; 7% Asian; 1% Native American; 1% Hawaiian/Pacific Islander; 3% Other
- Population (2018): 129,163
- Registered voters: 57,921

Nevada's 10th Senate district is one of 21 districts in the Nevada Senate. This seat is currently represented by Democrat Fabian Doñate who was appointed after fellow Democrat Yvanna Cancela's resignation on January 12, 2021 in order to join the incoming Biden-Harris Administration.

== Geography ==
District 10 is based just to the south of Las Vegas in Clark County, covering Winchester, Paradise, and a small portion of Las Vegas proper.

The district overlaps with Nevada's 1st and 3rd congressional districts, and with the 15th and 16th districts of the Nevada Assembly.

== Recent election results ==
Nevada Senators are elected to staggered four-year terms; since 2012 redistricting, the 10th district has held elections in midterm years.

=== 2022 ===
2022 Nevada State Senate election, District 10
Party	Candidate	Votes	%
Democratic	Fabian Doñate (incumbent)	16,714	55.5
Republican	Philip Graviet	12,284	40.8
Libertarian	Chris Cunningham	1,096	3.6
Total votes		30,094	100
Democratic hold			

== Historical election results ==
=== 2018 ===
2018 Nevada State Senate election, District 10
Primary election
Party	Candidate	Votes	%
Democratic	Yvanna Cancela (incumbent)	2,854	60.4
Democratic	Bryce Henderson	1,871	39.6
Total votes		4,725	100
General election
Democratic	Yvanna Cancela (incumbent)	20,383	100
Total votes		20,383	100
Democratic hold			

=== 2014 ===
2014 Nevada State Senate election, District 10
Party	Candidate	Votes	%
Democratic	Rubén Kihuen (incumbent)	8,143	64.9
Libertarian	Ed Uehling	4,409	35.1
Total votes		12,552	100
Democratic hold			

=== Federal and statewide results ===
Year	Office	Results
2020	President	Biden 62.4 – 35.4%
2018	Senate	Rosen 65.6 – 30.0%
2018	Governor	Sisolak 63.8 – 30.1%
2016	President	Clinton 63.0 – 31.3%
2012	President	Obama 68.0 – 29.8%
2012	Senate	Berkley 61.1 – 29.0%
