= Yvanna Cancela =

American politician (born 1987)

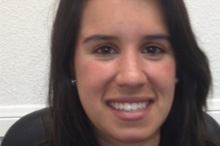

White House Senior Advisor to Governors and Statewide Elected Officials
- In office April 28, 2023 – January 20, 2025
- President: Joe Biden
- Preceded by: Kate Marshall
- Succeeded by: Position abolished

Chief of Staff to the Governor of Nevada
- In office September 1, 2021 – January 2, 2023
- Governor: Steve Sisolak
- Preceded by: Michelle White
- Succeeded by: Ben Kieckhefer

Deputy Director of the U.S. Health and Human Services office of Intergovernmental Affairs
- In office January 20, 2021 – August 9, 2021
- President: Joe Biden

Member of the Nevada Senate from the 10th district
- In office February 6, 2017 – January 12, 2021
- Preceded by: Rubén Kihuen
- Succeeded by: Fabian Doñate

Personal details
- Born: 1987 (age 38–39) Phoenix, Arizona, U.S.
- Party: Democratic
- Education: Northwestern University (BA); University of Nevada, Las Vegas (JD)

Yvanna Cancela (born 1987) is an American politician who served as a member of the Nevada Senate for the 10th district from 2017 to 2021. She joined the Biden administration on January 20, 2021.

== Early life and education ==
Cancela was born to Cuban immigrants in Phoenix, Arizona, and raised in Miami, Florida. She graduated from Northwestern University with a Bachelor of Arts degree in communications in 2010. While she served in the Nevada Senate, she earned her Juris Doctor from the William S. Boyd School of Law.

== Career ==
=== Nevada politics ===
During the summer of 2009, she interned in Harry Reid's United States Senate office. She then moved to Nevada to work on Reid's 2010 reelection campaign.

Cancela served as the political director for the Culinary Workers Union and as executive director of the Immigrant Workers Citizenship Project. In 2017, Cancela was chosen to succeed Ruben Kihuen, who was elected to the United States House of Representatives, in the Nevada Senate. She took office on February 6, 2017. She became the first Latina to serve in the Nevada Senate.

Cancela was selected as one of seventeen speakers to jointly deliver the keynote address at the 2020 Democratic National Convention. She was also chosen to serve as one of the convention's parliamentarians.

=== Biden administration ===
On January 12, 2021, Cancela announced her resignation in order to join the incoming administration of Joe Biden and Kamala Harris in the United States Department of Health and Human Services as the deputy director of intergovernmental affairs. Since her position does not require a confirmation vote from the United States Senate, she was sworn in on January 20, 2021, and immediately assumed her post.

=== Sisolak administration ===
On August 9, 2021, it was announced that Cancela would leave her position in the Department of Health and Human Services to serve as chief of staff for Governor Steve Sisolak. She assumed office on September 6, 2021.

Party political offices
| Preceded by Elizabeth Warren | Keynote Speaker of the Democratic National Convention; 2020; Served alongside: Stacey Abrams, Raumesh Akbari, Colin Allred, Brendan Boyle, Kathleen Clyde, Nikki Fried, Robert Garcia, Marlon Kimpson, Conor Lamb, Mari Manoogian, Victoria Neave, Jonathan Nez, Sam Park, Denny Ruprecht, Randall Woodfin | Succeeded by Angela Alsobrooks |
