= 2020 Democratic National Convention =

U.S. political event held in Milwaukee, Wisconsin and virtually online

- 2020 presidential election

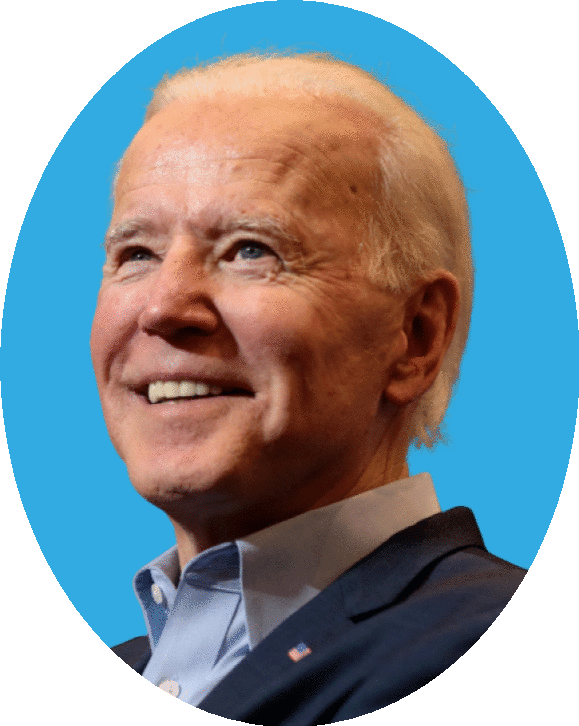
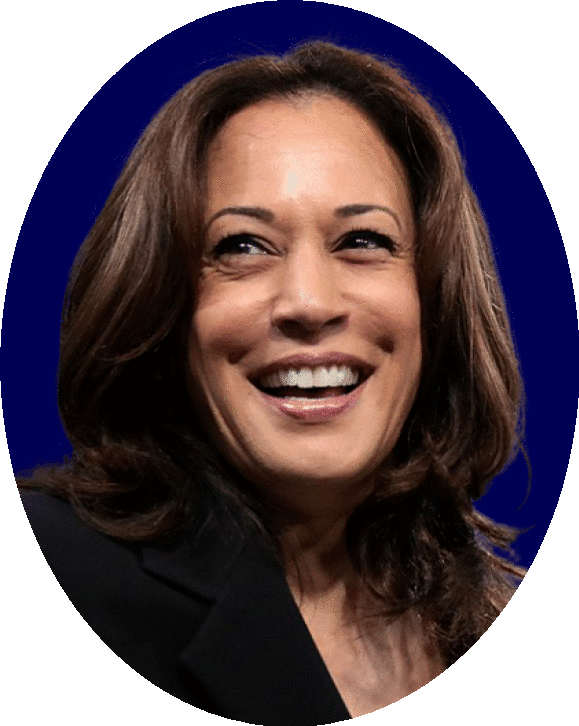
- Nominees; Biden and Harris

Convention
- Dates: August 17–20, 2020 (Note: Originally scheduled to be held July 13–16, but rescheduled due to the coronavirus pandemic.)
- City: Milwaukee, Wisconsin and various locations remotely
- Venue: Wisconsin Center and various remote locations
- Chair: Bennie Thompson
- Keynote speaker: 17 speakers
- Notable speakers: Joe Biden; Kamala Harris; Jimmy Carter; Bill Clinton; Barack Obama; John Kerry; Hillary Clinton; Michelle Obama; Jill Biden; Colin Powell; Chuck Schumer; Keisha Lance Bottoms; Bernie Sanders; Cory Booker; Elizabeth Warren; Amy Klobuchar; Doug Jones; Catherine Cortez Masto; Jim Clyburn; Cedric Richmond; Gretchen Whitmer; Andrew Cuomo; Gavin Newsom; John Kasich; Muriel Bowser; Pete Buttigieg; Andrew Yang; Alexandria Ocasio-Cortez

Candidates
- Presidential nominee: Joe Biden of Delaware
- Vice-presidential nominee: Kamala Harris of California

Voting
- Total delegates: 4,749
- Votes needed for nomination: 2,375 (Absolute Majority)
- Results (president): Biden (DE): 3,558 (74.92%); Sanders (VT): 1,151 (24.24%); Abstention: 5 (0.10%); Not Voting: 35 (0.74%)
- Results (vice president): Harris (CA): Acclamation
- Ballots: 1

The 2020 Democratic National Convention was a presidential nominating convention that was held from August 17 to 20, 2020, at the Wisconsin Center in Milwaukee, Wisconsin, and virtually across the United States. At the convention, delegates of the United States Democratic Party formally chose former Vice President Joe Biden and Senator Kamala Harris of California as the party's nominees for president and vice president, respectively, in the 2020 United States presidential election.

Originally scheduled to be held July 13–16, 2020, at the Fiserv Forum in Milwaukee just a week before the planned start of the Tokyo Summer Olympics, the convention was postponed to August 17–20, 2020, due to the ongoing COVID-19 pandemic in the United States. The convention was ultimately downsized, with its location shifted to the city's Wisconsin Center. Due to pandemic restraints, Milwaukee's host city role was decreased to that of a headquarters for the broadcast, with most of the convention activities occurring remotely from sites across the United States.

Adapting to pandemic restraints, the format was substantially different from previous conventions, with the duration of each day of the convention being significantly shorter than in past conventions and with most of the convention activity occurring held remotely from many venues across the country rather than at a single venue. Its activities were largely decentralized and it was regarded to be a "virtual" convention. However, the convention was officially considered to centered at the Wisconsin Center, which is where its production was headquartered, its roll call was directed from, and where a limited number of speeches (primarily those by Wisconsin politicians) were delivered. Both Biden and Harris instead delivered their acceptance speeches remotely from the Chase Center on the Riverfront in Wilmington, Delaware. Biden and Harris went on to win the 2020 election, defeating the Republican Party ticket of incumbent president Donald Trump, and Vice President Mike Pence.

== Background ==
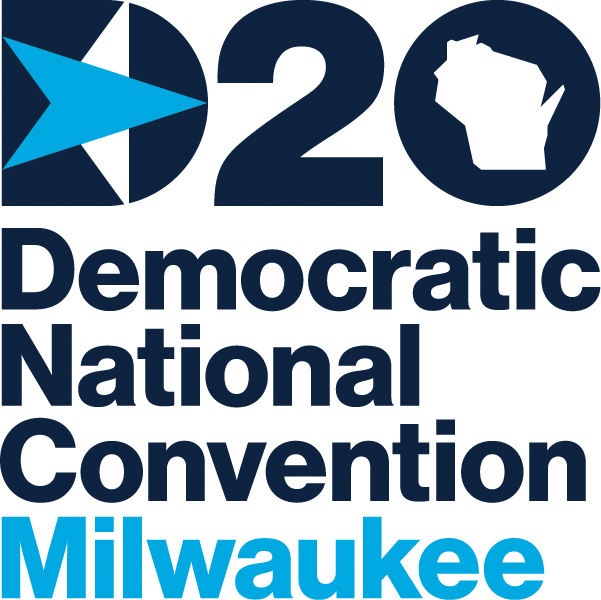
The originally-slated logo of the 49th Democratic National Convention, which included a geographical representation of the host state of Wisconsin

The convention was the 49th Democratic National Convention.

=== Site selection ===
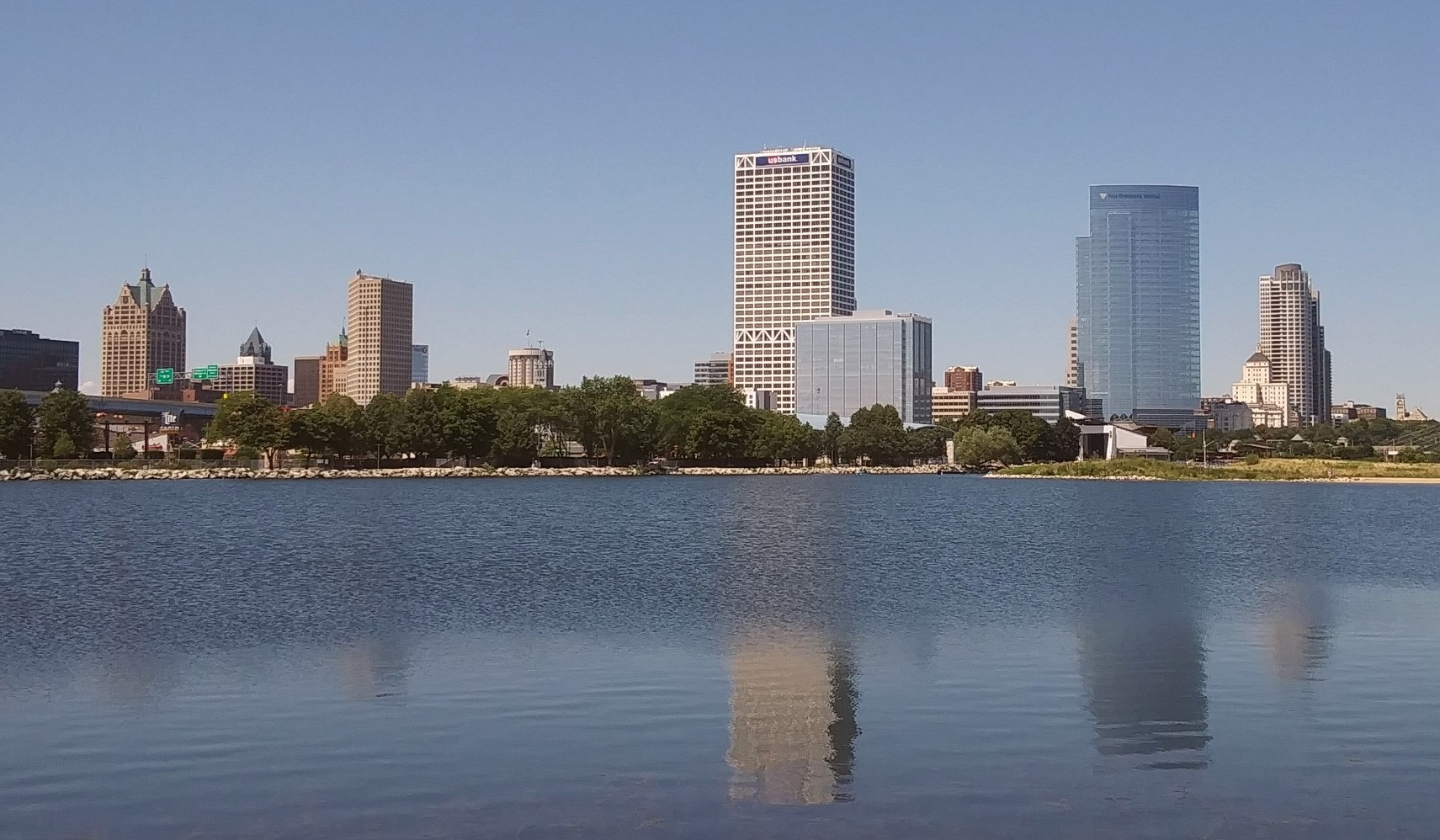
The host city of the convention was Milwaukee, Wisconsin.

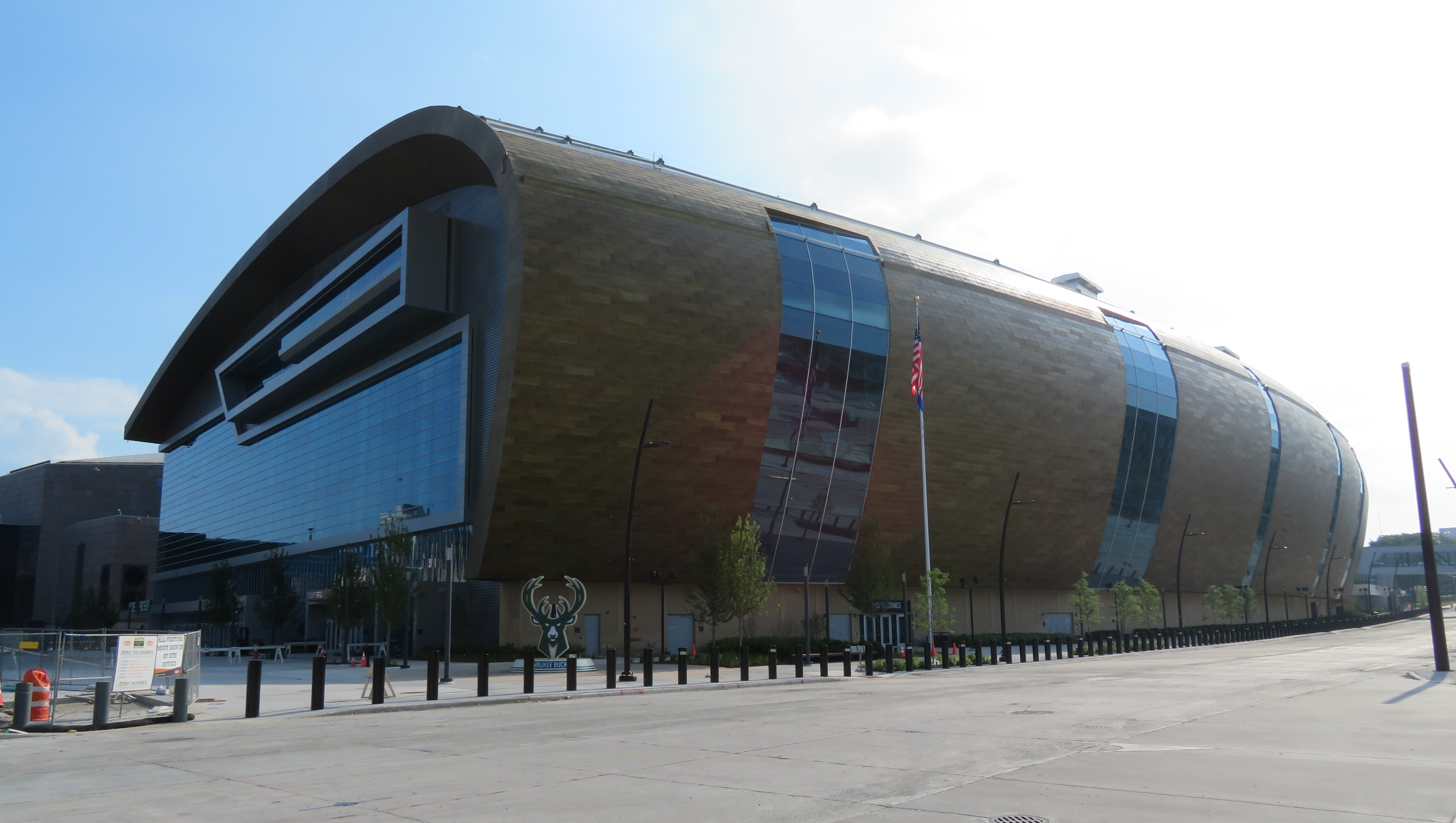
The Fiserv Forum was the original venue selected for the convention.

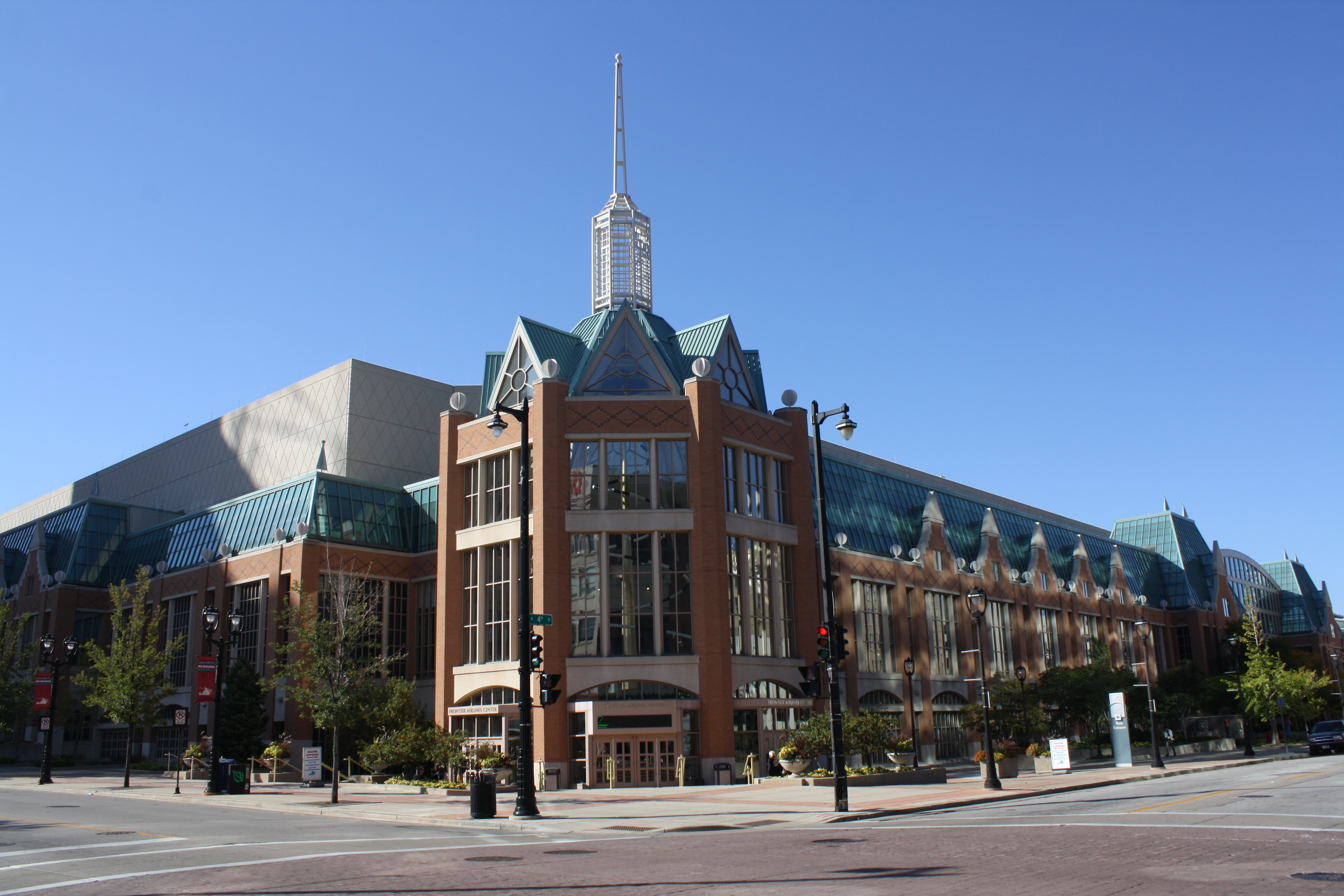
Wisconsin Center was ultimately the main location of the convention amid venue downsizing due to the COVID-19 pandemic.

Bids on the site for the convention were solicited by the Democratic National Committee (DNC) in late 2017. In the spring of 2018, the Democratic National Committee made public which cities it had received bids from. The field subsequently narrowed, with Las Vegas withdrawing after deciding it would focus solely on bidding for the 2020 Republican National Convention (an effort Las Vegas later abandoned without submitting a formal bid, with Republicans ultimately selecting the sole bid it received from Charlotte). In April 2018, the Democratic National Committee sent requests for proposals to the eight remaining cities that had expressed interest in hosting the event (Atlanta, Birmingham, Denver, Houston, Miami, Milwaukee, New York City, and San Francisco). On June 20, 2018, the Democratic National Committee announced four finalists for the convention site (Denver, Houston, Miami, and Milwaukee). Immediately following the announcement, the finalist city of Denver withdrew from consideration due to apparent scheduling conflicts.

Tom Perez (chairman of the Democratic National Committee) announced on March 11, 2019, that Milwaukee had won the bidding process host the convention.

Milwaukee's selection was seen, in part, as emphasizing party's desire to place an focus on winning Midwestern states like Wisconsin, and its desire to win back "blue wall" states in the upper Midwest and Great Lakes region. The swing states of Michigan, Pennsylvania, and Wisconsin had been the states which the Republican ticket of Donald Trump and Mike Pence had won by the narrowest margins in the preceding 2016 election, and had these states been instead won by the 2016 Democratic ticket of Hillary Clinton and Tim Kaine, they would have delivered the Democratic ticket an electoral college victory in 2016. The 2016 election had also been the first time since the 1980s that any of these three states had voted Republican. The three aforementioned "blue wall" states were, ultimately, won by the Biden-Harris ticket in 2020.

==== Change of venue ====
On June 24, 2020, it was announced that the convention had been downsized and would be held at Milwaukee's Wisconsin Center instead of its originally planned venue, Milwaukee's Fiserv Forum. The change of location made this the first major party convention held in a convention center since the 1996 Republican National Convention, and the first Democratic convention to be held in such a venue since the 1984 Democratic National Convention.

=== Role of superdelegates ===
Superdelegates are delegates to the convention who are automatically chosen by the party, rather than by the results of primaries and caucuses. While technically unpledged, in the past many of them have informally pledged themselves to a predesignated front-runner in previous elections. The superdelegate system is controversial among Democrats, and supporters of both Clinton and Sanders have called for their removal in 2020.

The Unity Reform Commission, created after the 2016 election, recommended that the number of 2020 superdelegates be drastically reduced. In July 2018, the DNC revoked the voting rights for superdelegates on the first ballot, unless a candidate has secured a majority using only pledged delegates.

Except for the presidential nomination, superdelegates will vote on all issues.

=== Selection of pledged delegates ===
The number of delegates allocated to each of the 50 states and Washington, D.C., are based on, among others, the proportion of votes each state gave to the Democratic candidate in the 2008, 2012, and 2016 presidential elections. A fixed number of pledged delegates are allocated to each of the five U.S. territories and Democrats Abroad.

==== Qualification of suspended campaigns ====
The Democratic National Committee's 2020 selection rules state that any candidate who is no longer running loses the statewide delegates they have won and those delegates are then reallocated to candidates still in the race. However, the interpretation of this rule in 2020 races might be different from the interpretation in past races. In previous elections, such as the 2008 presidential primary, candidates would suspend their candidacies rather than formally withdraw, allowing their already pledged delegates to attend the convention and pick up new ones along the way. They would then formally withdraw when it was too late to reallocate the delegations.

== Logistics ==
Before it was downsized, 50,000 people had been expected to attend the convention. 31 state delegations were to stay in 2,926 Milwaukee-area hotel rooms and 26 delegations were to stay in 2,841 hotel rooms in Lake County and Rosemont, Illinois. Another 11,000 hotel rooms were to house volunteers, members of the media, donors, and other attendees. Additionally, dormitories at Milwaukee-area universities and colleges were planned to accommodate some convention guests and volunteers. The Hilton Milwaukee City Center was to serve as the convention's "headquarters hotel". The convention's host committee had raised $40 million towards staging the convention.

=== Delay and downsizing ===
The convention was originally scheduled to be held July 13–16, 2020, On April 2, 2020, it was announced that, due to the COVID-19 pandemic, the convention would be delayed to August 17–20.

As early as April 2020, the Democratic Party had been bracing for the possibility of a virtual convention. On May 12, 2020, the Democratic National Committee authorized the convention planners to research alternative methods for participants to cast votes, considering the possibility that the Democratic National Committee may decide to hold the entire convention virtually.

On June 24, 2020, it was announced that the convention was to be downsized. The venue was shifted from the Fiserv Forum to the Wisconsin Center. But, instead of the entire convention being held in Milwaukee, it would now feature Milwaukee as merely a hub city for the major convention events. The convention was now planned to instead consist of what the DNC said would be "curated content from Milwaukee and other satellite cities, locations, and landmarks across the country". All official business will now be conducted remotely. Organizers canceled official parties and events scheduled to be held in Milwaukee before and coinciding with the convention. Delegates were asked to no longer travel to Milwaukee, and plans were now formally made to implement a system for them to cast their votes virtually. The following month, in mid-July, members of Congress were also told not to travel to Milwaukee for the event.

It had initially been announced, amid the downsizing, that Biden and his running mate would still deliver their acceptance speeches in Milwaukee. However, on August 5, 2020, it was announced that Biden no longer planned to travel to Milwaukee to accept his nomination, and would instead do so from Delaware. It was also announced then that a number of other speakers that had been scheduled to travel to Milwaukee, including Biden's running mate, would also instead be addressing the convention remotely. This was seen as, effectively, moving to make the convention almost entirely virtual.

While there were initially plans to have up to 5,000 attendees in Milwaukee for the convention at the inception of its downsizing, this number gradually shrunk. The total number of people permitted to gather at the Milwaukee convention hub ultimately shrunk to 250 people, the limit that local health orders in Milwaukee placed on gatherings. Only a few speakers, such as Chairman of the Democratic National Committee Tom Perez and Secretary of the Democratic National Committee Jason Rae (also secretary of the convention), participated in the convention from the Milwaukee hub.

=== Health protocols ===
Due to the ongoing COVID-19 pandemic, a number of protocols have been put in place. Participants at Wisconsin Center were required to self-quarantine for at least 72 hours before arriving, wear personal protective equipment, undergo daily COVID-19 testing, partake in symptom tracking through a daily questionnaire, avoid bars and restaurants, and follow Centers for Disease Control and Prevention guidelines.

=== Security ===
As is routine for a major party convention, the event had been designated a National Special Security Event. Originally, the United States Department of Justice was to provide $50 million in security, but this was decreased to $40 million.

Due to the downsizing of the convention, the security footprint for the convention was much smaller than had been originally planned, encompassing almost only areas directly surrounding the convention center. To create the security perimeter, fencing was erected surrounding the Wisconsin Center. Temporary flight restrictions were in place each night from 6:00 to 11:00 p.m. CDT. A ban on drones was also in place.

=== Programming ===
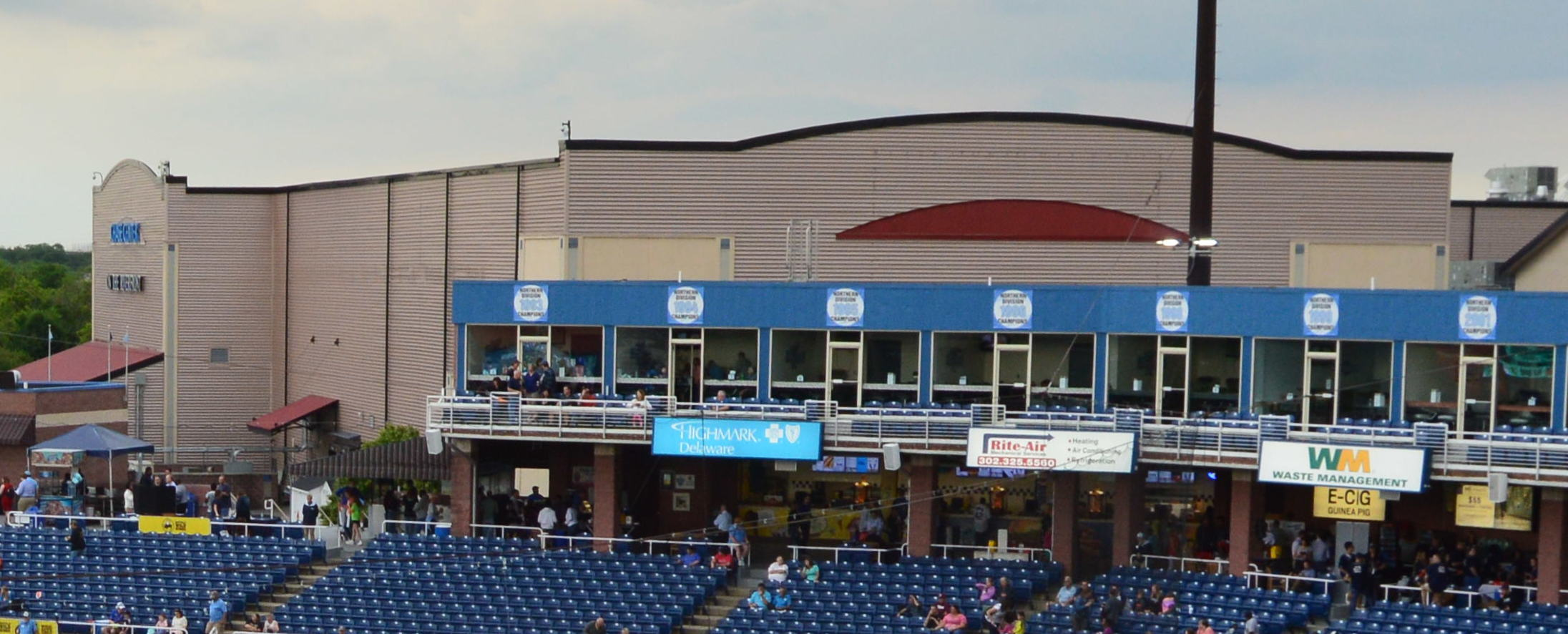
Chase Center on the Riverfront in Wilmington, Delaware, the location of Biden and Harris's acceptance speeches.

The official theme of the convention was "Uniting America". The Wisconsin Center was used for the convention's broadcast and production, acting as the control room and "hub" of the convention production. The convention's programming was a mix of pre-recorded segments and live broadcasts from sites across the United States. The convention organizers established a custom video control room in the exhibit hall on the third floor of the Wisconsin Center, designed to handle hundreds of feeds from across the country, in order to accommodate the remote speeches. Supplementary control rooms existed in other locations, such as in Delaware. Producer Glenn Weiss oversaw the production from a temporary control studio created for him at his personal residence. Also acting as producer was Ricky Kirshner.

Speakers appeared from various "satellite locations", including key studios in Los Angeles, New York City, and at the Chase Center on the Riverfront in Wilmington, Delaware. The broadcasts were emceed by their nightly hosts from the studio in Los Angeles. All of the speeches were held behind closed doors with no in-person audience.

The duration of the convention program was significantly downsized from one that was originally expected to total 24 hours over the four days to one that would total only eight hours.

In addition to the televised convention programming, further content was livestreamed by the Democratic Party on digital platforms.

== Platform ==
In April, shortly after Sanders endorsed Biden, the two created a "Unity task force" to draft a version of the party platform. The Democratic National Convention Committee set up a series of "virtual platform meetings" to garner input from the general public.

The Platform Drafting Committee Chair was Atlanta mayor Keisha Lance Bottoms. The Platform Standing Committee includes a number of party leaders and elected officials appointed by the DNC:

=== Drafting process ===
Public hearings were live-streamed on the DNCC's YouTube channel on the following topics:

- Monday, June 29 from 5-8 p.m. ET: "Addressing the COVID-19 Health Crisis and Building Back Better." A "Medicare for All" provision was rejected by the committee on June 27 on a 125–36 vote.
- Wednesday, July 1 from 5-8 p.m. ET: "A Vision for a More Equitable Future"
- Thursday, July 2 from 5-8 p.m. ET: "Restoring the Soul of America"

The full Platform Drafting Committee met on July 15 and 27, where they submitted a finished product to be voted on via the internet from August 1–15.

=== Platform provisions and ratification ===
After months of negotiations, Biden/Sanders platform task force issued its 110-page report on July 9 outlining platform recommendations. Convention delegates officially adopted the Democratic Party's 2020 platform on August 18, following delegate balloting by mail. The platform was divided into ten sections: "pandemic response, the economy, health care, criminal justice, climate, immigration, education, foreign policy, voting rights, and identity-related rights issues." The platform calls for:

- A universal public health insurance option for all Americans.
- Allowing Medicare to negotiate for lower prescription drug prices.
- Universal free COVID-19 testing, treatment, and vaccines.
- To combat climate change, eliminating carbon emissions (pollution) from power plants by 2035 and making substantial investments in U.S. infrastructure and renewable energy.
- Increasing housing supply, including affordable housing.
- Making community colleges tuition-free for all, and making public colleges and universities tuition-free for students from families with under $125,000 in annual income.
- An increase in the minimum wage to $15 an hour and an increase in the Child and Dependent Care tax credit.
- Comprehensive criminal justice reform.
- Repealing the Hyde Amendment.
- Decriminalizing the use of marijuana and allowing states to fully legalize marijuana.
- Statehood for the District of Columbia; self-determination for Puerto Rico, including the right of Puerto Ricans to decide whether to become a state; and restoration of Voting Rights Act provisions.
- Comprehensive immigration reform, including a pathway to citizenship for unauthorized immigrants.
- "Bring our forever wars to a responsible end" but maintain a small U.S. military presence in Iraq to "ensure the lasting defeat of ISIS"
- End the "race to war with Iran" and seek restoration of the Obama-era multilateral agreement with Iran.
- Support for a two-state solution to the Israeli–Palestinian conflict, coupled with an "ironclad" commitment to the security of Israel.

The platform was considered by some sources to be the most progressive in Democratic Party history, and the most progressive for any major political party in U.S. history. However, there was some dissent from the party's left wing over the omission of platform planks supporting single-payer healthcare ("Medicare for All") or the Green New Deal. Prior to the convention, over 700 delegates, largely from Bernie Sanders' camp, previously signed a statement vowing to vote against the platform because it did not include a provision supporting Medicare for All; this included U.S. representatives Rashida Tlaib and Ro Khanna. The platform was adopted, with 3,562 delegates in support and 1,069 voted no, a further 87 abstained.

== Convention leadership ==
On March 26, 2019, Joe Solmonese, former president of the Human Rights Campaign, was named convention CEO.

On June 1, 2020, the campaign of presumptive nominee Joe Biden named two advisers to the convention, naming Addisu Demissie as adviser for convention coordination and Lindsay Holst as senior adviser for convention and special projects.

Programming was overseen by Ricky Kirshner, who acted as a producer. In addition, Stephanie Cutter held the formal position of program executive. Glenn Weiss acted as the director. Jessica Jennings was the director of media logistics.

=== Officers ===
On July 30, 2020, the officers of the convention were designated. Representative Bennie Thompson served as the permanent chair of the convention.

Permanent co-chairs were Milwaukee mayor Tom Barrett, Rep. Tony Cárdenas of California, Senator Tom Carper of Delaware, Senator Tammy Duckworth of Illinois, Mayor of Atlanta Keisha Lance Bottoms, and New Jersey governor Phil Murphy. The convention's vice-chairs were Senator Bob Casey Jr. of Pennsylvania, former representative Tony Coelho of California, Representative Sharice Davids of Kansas, Lieutenant Governor of Michigan Garlin Gilchrist, Congresswoman Donna Shalala of Florida, former representative Carol Shea-Porter of New Hampshire, Lieutenant Governor of Wisconsin Mandela Barnes, and Lieutenant Governor of Nevada Kate Marshall. Speaker of the House Nancy Pelosi and Senate minority leader Chuck Schumer served as honorary chairs.

The convention's sergeant-at-arms was Representative Gwen Moore of Wisconsin. Jason Rae acted as secretary of the convention. The convention's parliamentarians were House majority leader Steny Hoyer, Helen McFadden, Sarah E. Merkle, and state senator Yvanna Cancela of Nevada.

== Nominating and balloting ==
=== Pre-convention delegate count ===
The table below reflects the presumed delegate count as per the 2020 Democratic primaries.

As of July 2020, the following overall number of pledged delegates is subject to change, as possible penalty/bonus delegates (awarded for each state scheduled election date and potential regional clustering) may be altered.

The 2020 Democratic Party rules state that, unless a candidate has secured a majority of delegates using only pledged delegates, the superdelegates will have no voting rights on the first ballot.

Candidates who have suspended their campaigns without having received any pledged or superdelegate endorsements, as well as those who've suspended their campaigns and subsequently lost their endorsements to other candidates, are not included in the table below.

The table below reflects the presumed pledged delegate count following the 2020 Democratic presidential primaries. In addition to these, there were also 771 superdelegate votes (including the eight half-votes belonging to Democrats Abroad superdelegates), making for 4,750 combined delegate votes.

Pledged delegates by candidate
Candidate	Pledged delegates
Joe Biden	2,720
Bernie Sanders	1,114
Elizabeth Warren	61
Michael Bloomberg	49
Pete Buttigieg	24
Amy Klobuchar	7
Tulsi Gabbard	2
Other	2
Total pledged delegate votes	3,979

=== Presidential balloting ===
Results of the delegate roll call by state/territory Joe Biden Bernie Sanders

In an email, DNC secretary Jason Rae wrote to delegates outlining the process for that year's convention, noting that the planning committee "concluded that state delegations should not plan to travel to Milwaukee and official convention business will be conducted remotely."

Instead of a traditional in-person roll call, delegates voted remotely using a system the planning committee crafted that enabled them to cast their ballots via email, with unique identifiers for security. The DNC had plans regarding certifying each delegate. The party said delegates would be able to fill out the forms electronically, with no need for a printer or physical copy, according to the letter. The ballot, which includes questions about platform planks and the party's nominees, will be emailed to their state's committee. Once a state party had all the ballots from their delegation, the state delegation's chair would "submit a tally sheet to the Secretary's Office that formally records the number of votes cast on each item of convention business," The votes would be counted all at once on August 15, not as they come in.

Voting began August 3 and ended August 15, when the state delegation chairs were asked to submit their final tallies to the DNC secretary. That meant that the party knew the tally of votes for its nominee before the convention formally began.

Democratic presidential nomination ballot
Candidates	Joe Biden	Bernie Sanders	Abstain (Note: Includes all delegates not voting, whether announced as abstentions or not.)
Alabama	52	8	0
Alaska	12	7	0
American Samoa	11	0	0
Arizona	51	29	0
Arkansas	27	9	0
California	263	231	0
Colorado	42	36	1 (Note: Declared abstention)
Connecticut	75	0	0
Delaware	32	0	0
Democrats Abroad	7	10	0
Washington, D.C.	43	1	1
Florida	192	57	0
Georgia	117	0	1
Guam	11	2	0
Hawaii	23	9	1
Idaho	16	9	0
Illinois	122	59	1
Indiana	86	2	1
Iowa	38	11	0
Kansas	35	10	0
Kentucky	60	0	0
Louisiana	60	0	0
Maine	22	9	1
Maryland	119	1	0
Massachusetts	83	30	1
Michigan	92	53	2
Minnesota	60	31	0
Mississippi	38	2	1
Missouri	50	28	1
Montana	18	1	6
Nebraska	33	0	0
Nevada	25	24	0
New Hampshire	24	9	0
New Jersey	139	5	2
New Mexico	42	4	0
New York	277	44	3
North Carolina	83	39	0
North Dakota	8	10	0
Northern Marianas	9	2	0
Ohio	134	20	0
Oklahoma	24	13	6
Oregon	57	16	1
Pennsylvania	175	34	1
Puerto Rico	53	5	0
Rhode Island	34	1	0
South Carolina	49	15	0
South Dakota	17	3	1
Tennessee	50	23	0
Texas	161	98	1
Utah	16	17	1
Vermont	9	15	0
Virgin Islands, U.S.	13	0	0
Virginia	91	32	1
Washington	66	43	0
West Virginia	34	0	0
Wisconsin	67	30	0
Wyoming	11	4	3
Unassigned			2
States and territories	53	4	0
Total delegates	3,558	1,151	40 (Note: 35 delegates did not vote)

==== Ceremonial roll call during the convention ====
The traditional roll call of the states was ceremonially held on the second night of the convention. It was done remotely from each of the 57 delegations, including all 50 states and seven additional territories/jurisdictions (the District of Columbia, the five inhabited U.S. territories, and Democrats Abroad). Organizers planned for it to last approximately 30 minutes. Convention secretary Jason Rae directed the roll call from the Wisconsin Center.

The remote roll call was widely praised.

==== Vice presidential nomination ====
The Rules Committee report which was passed by the convention addressed, among other things, the fiascos that occurred during the 1972 and 1980 conventions as regards selection of the vice-presidential nominee.

Rule C.7. of the Rules of Procedure states:

7. Nomination for the Democratic Candidate for Vice President: The Democratic candidate(s) for Vice President shall be nominated by the Presidential candidate who has obtained a number of pledged delegates equal to a majority of all pledged and automatic delegates to the Convention. If there is only one nominee for Vice President, the Chair is authorized to declare the nominated individual the Democratic Candidate for Vice President.

In accordance with this provision, Biden submitted Harris's name to the chairman, Bennie Thompson, and after Thompson's public reading of the rule, she was declared nominated.

== Schedule ==
Each night of the convention was planned to last two hours. In addition to the convention's overall official theme of "Uniting America", each night had an official sub-theme of its own.

In past conventions, hundreds of people had given addressing, providing many local and statewide candidates valuable photo op. The 2020 convention was notably different, with a far more limited slate of speakers. Additionally, some of the speeches at the 2020 convention were pre-recorded, a departure from most convention speeches.

The convention included performances by Leon Bridges, the Chicks, Common, Billie Eilish, Jennifer Hudson, John Legend, Billy Porter, Maggie Rogers, Prince Royce, Stephen Stills, and others.

While most speakers at the convention were of notoriety, there were also a number of speakers at the convention included individuals who were non-famous everyday Americans, as opposed to than officeholders or celebrities. A number of these speakers were dissatisfied Republicans, including individuals who had voted for Trump in 2016, but plan on voting for Biden in 2020.

Caucus meetings and other events were streamed on various platforms earlier on the days of the convention.

== Notable speeches ==
=== Jill Biden ===
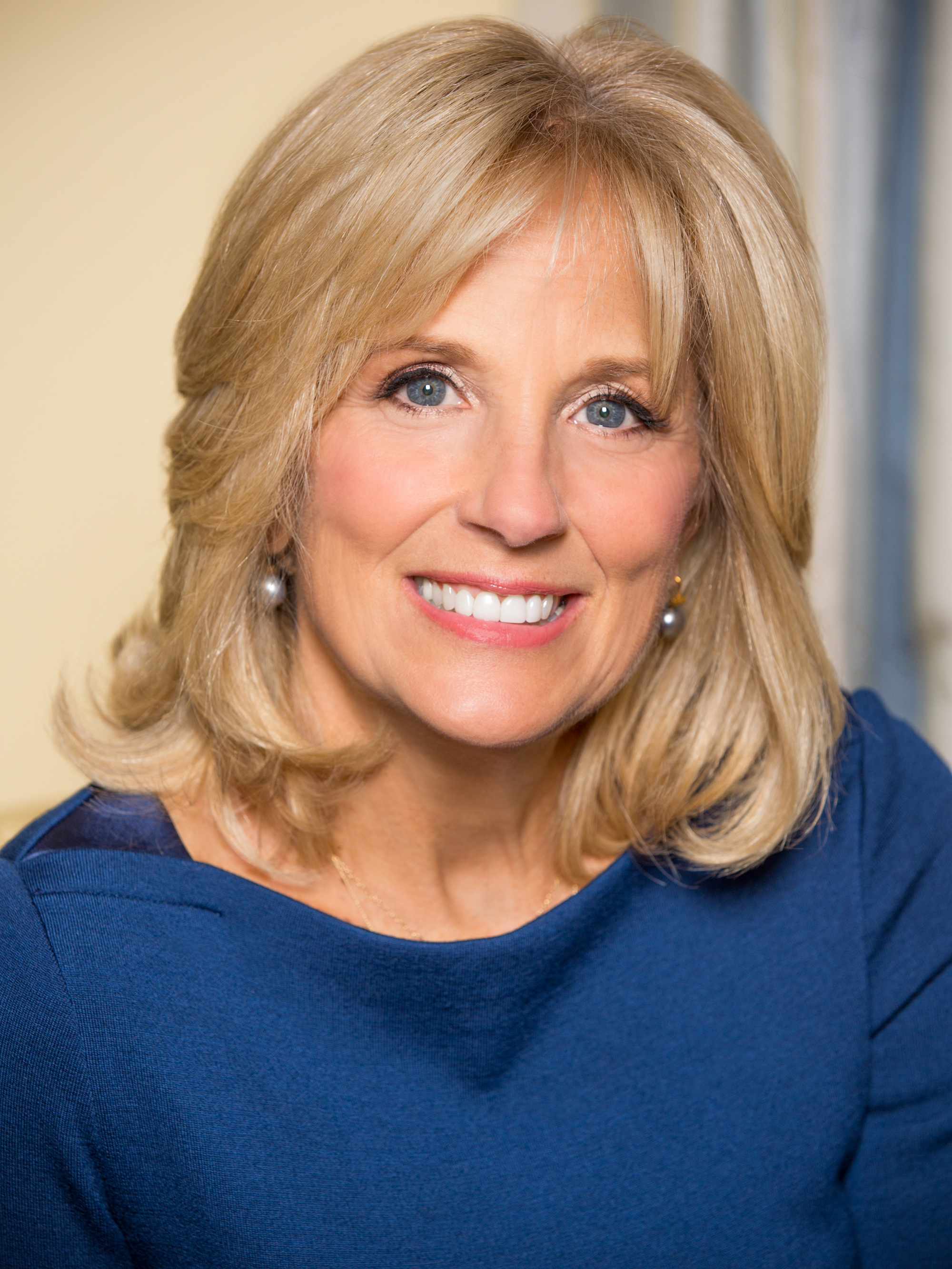

How do you make a broken family whole? The same way you make a nation whole. With love and understanding – and with small acts of kindness. With bravery. With unwavering faith.

— Jill Biden at the 2020 Democratic National Convention

Jill Biden, the spouse of presidential nominee Joe Biden and the former second lady of the United States, delivered her speech on the second night of the convention from the classroom at Brandywine High School in Wilmington, Delaware, where she had been an English teacher from 1991 through 1993.

Biden's speech was focused on both family and education. She discussed how the ongoing COVID-19 pandemic had impacted education, as well as families and the economy. She touted her husband as a candidate capable of tackling the pandemic.

Biden also recounted the personal tragedies that her husband had endured, including the deaths of his first wife, Neilia, and first-born daughter, Naomi, in a 1972 automobile accident, and the 2015 death of his son Beau from brain cancer.

=== Joe Biden ===
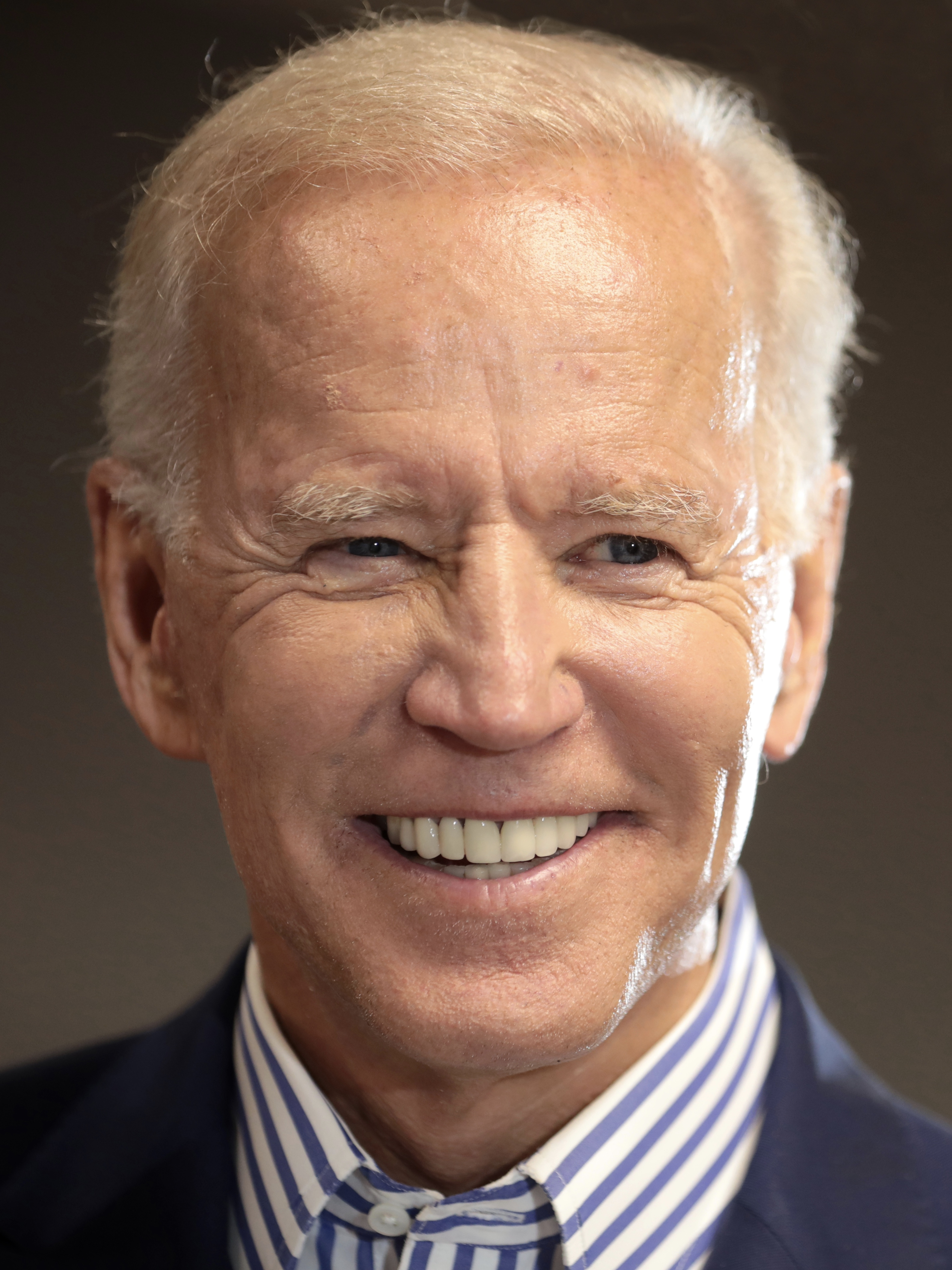

Here and now I give you my word. If you entrust me with the presidency, I will draw on the best of us, not the worst. I will be an ally of the light, not the darkness. It's time for us, for we, the people, to come together. And make no mistake. United we can and will overcome this season of darkness in America.

— Joe Biden at the 2020 Democratic National Convention

Joe Biden, the 2020 Democratic nominee for president, delivered a speech on the fourth night of the convention from Wilmington, Delaware. A common motif emphasized throughout was the conflict between light and darkness, casting himself as an element of light and Donald Trump as an element of darkness . While drawing a contrast between himself and Trump, Biden's speech did not include any utterances of his main opponent's name.

Biden began his speech by quoting Ella Baker. Biden pledged to be a president for all Americans, regardless of whether or not they voted for him.

Biden referenced the murder of George Floyd in his speech.

=== Michael Bloomberg ===
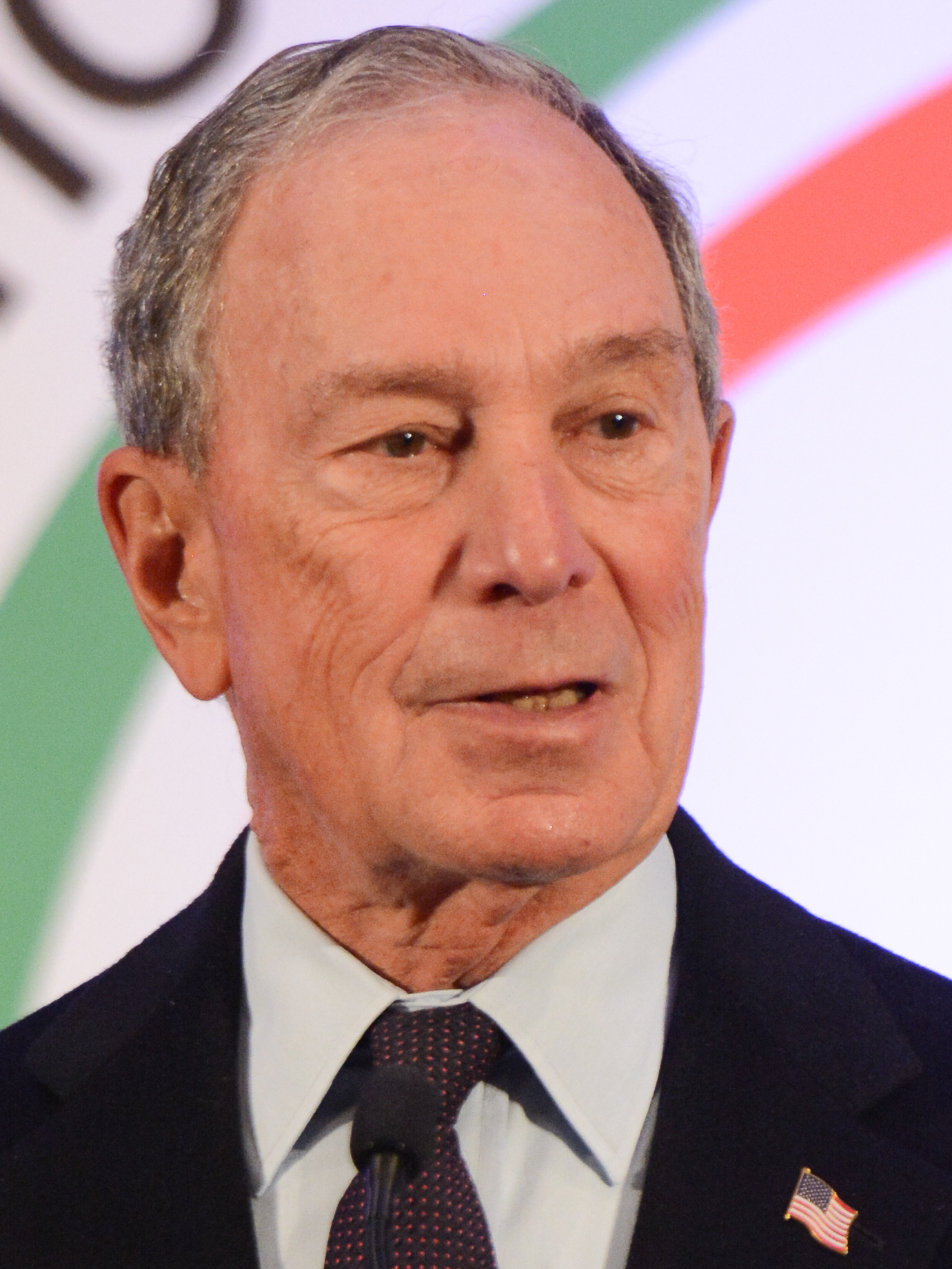

The two people running for president couldn't be more different. One believes in facts. One does not. One listens to experts. The other thinks he knows everything. One looks forward and sees strength in America's diversity. The other looks backwards and sees immigrants as enemies and white supremacists as allies. Here's another difference. One has proven he knows how to handle a crisis by helping to lead the economic turnaround after the 2008 recession, while the other has not only failed to lead, he has made the current crisis much worse.

— Michael Bloomberg at the 2020 Democratic National Convention

Former mayor of New York City and candidate for the 2020 Democratic nomination Michael Bloomberg delivered his speech on the final night of the convention from Colorado.

Bloomberg laid contrast between incumbent Republican president Donald Trump and Biden.

Bloomberg declared, "I'm not asking you to vote against Donald Trump because he's a bad guy. I'm urging you to vote against him because he's done a bad job."

Bloomberg likened the prospect reelecting Trump to rehiring or working for, "someone who ran your business into the ground, and who always does what's best for him or her, even when it hurts the company, and whose reckless decisions put you in danger".

=== Pete Buttigieg ===
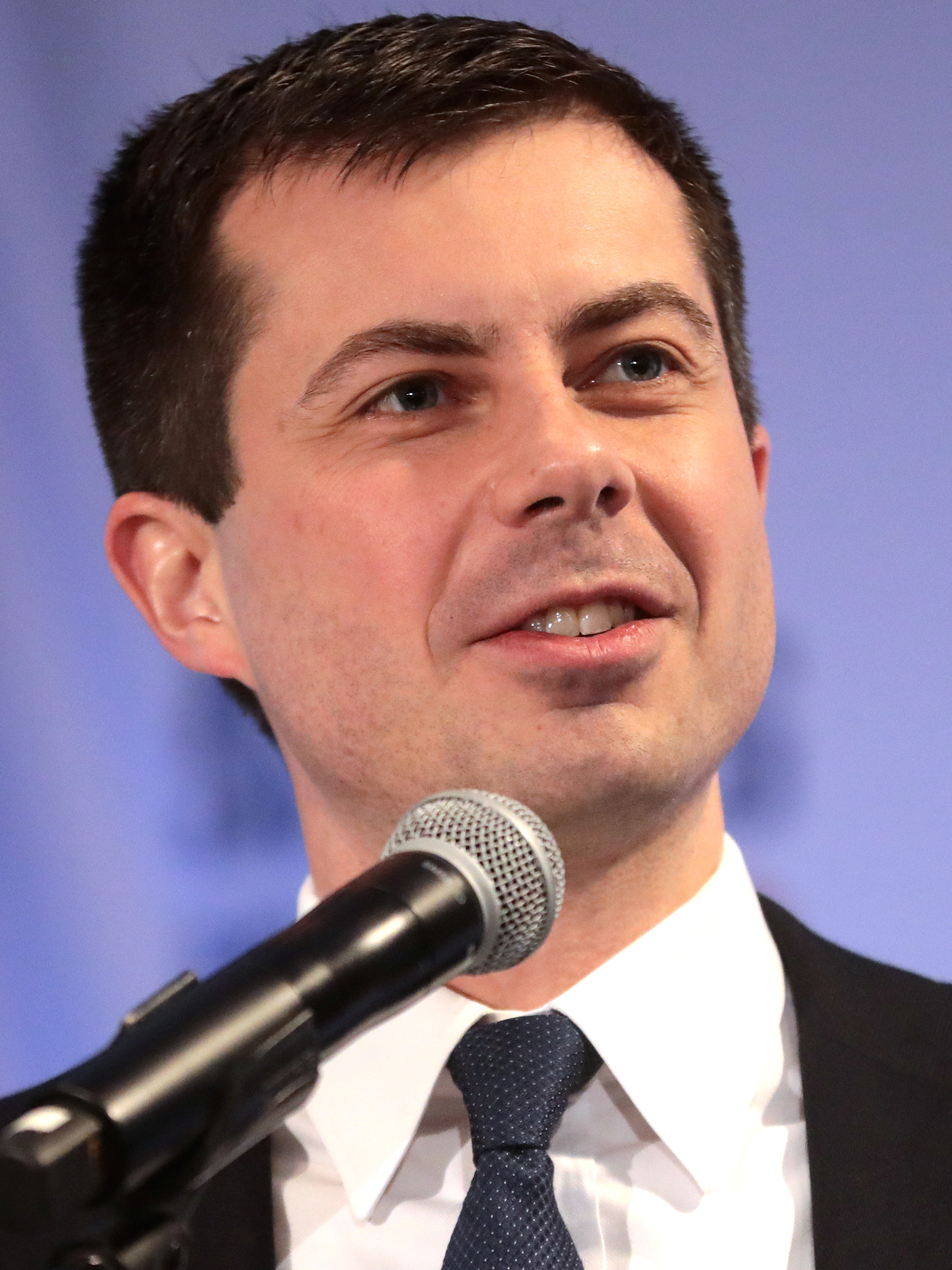

I trust Joe Biden and Kamala Harris to guide this nation toward that better future, because I have seen their commitment, and their empathy, up close. And I trust the capacity of America to grow more inclusive, because I have lived it.

— Pete Buttigieg at the 2020 Democratic National Convention

Former mayor of South Bend, Indiana and candidate for the 2020 Democratic nomination Pete Buttigieg delivered his speech on the final night of the convention from LangLab in South Bend, Indiana, where he and his husband, Chasten, had held their wedding reception years earlier.

Buttigieg, himself openly homosexual, highlighted the progress that the United States had made on LGBT rights during his lifetime, pointing to his marriage (enabled by the 2015 Obergefell v. Hodges Supreme Court decision) and the viability of his candidacy as an openly gay candidate for the presidency as two examples of such progress. He also mentioned how, earlier in his life, when he served in the military, the "Don't ask, don't tell" policy (which had since been repealed in 2011 under the Obama administration) had barred him from being open about his sexuality while in service.

=== Bill Clinton ===
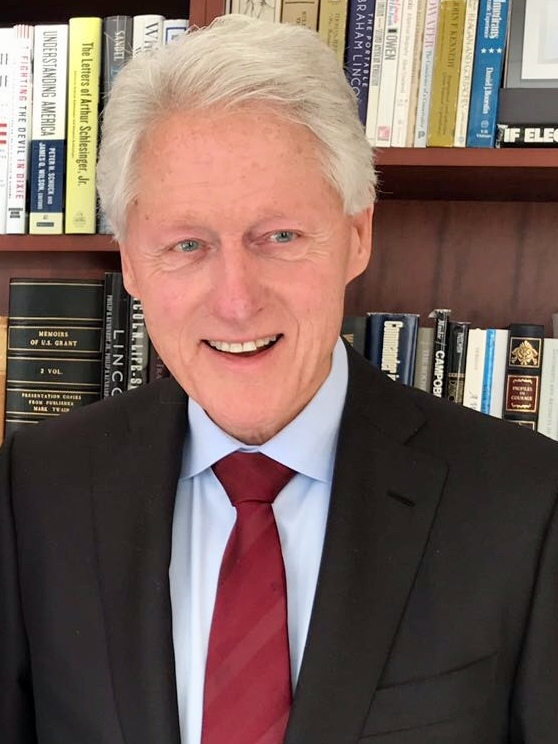

Our party is united in offering you a very different choice: a go-to-work president. A down-to-earth, get-the-job-done guy. A man with a mission: to take responsibility, not shift the blame; concentrate, not distract; unite, not divide. Our choice is Joe Biden.

— Bill Clinton at the 2020 Democratic National Convention

Former president of the United States Bill Clinton delivered his speech on the second night of the convention from Chappaqua, New York.

Clinton began his speech by declaring that he believed United States presidential elections to be, "the world's most important job interview".

Clinton lambasted President Donald Trump's response to the COVID-19 pandemic.

Clinton praised Biden's work in the Obama administration on efforts to repair the United States economy from the Great Recession. He praised Biden's plans to rebuild the United States economy from the downturn it experienced amid the COVID-19 pandemic.

He argued that Biden should be elected and that Trump should be denied a second term, declaring, "You know what Donald Trump will do with four more years: blame, bully, and belittle. And you know what Joe Biden will do: build back better."

=== Hillary Clinton ===
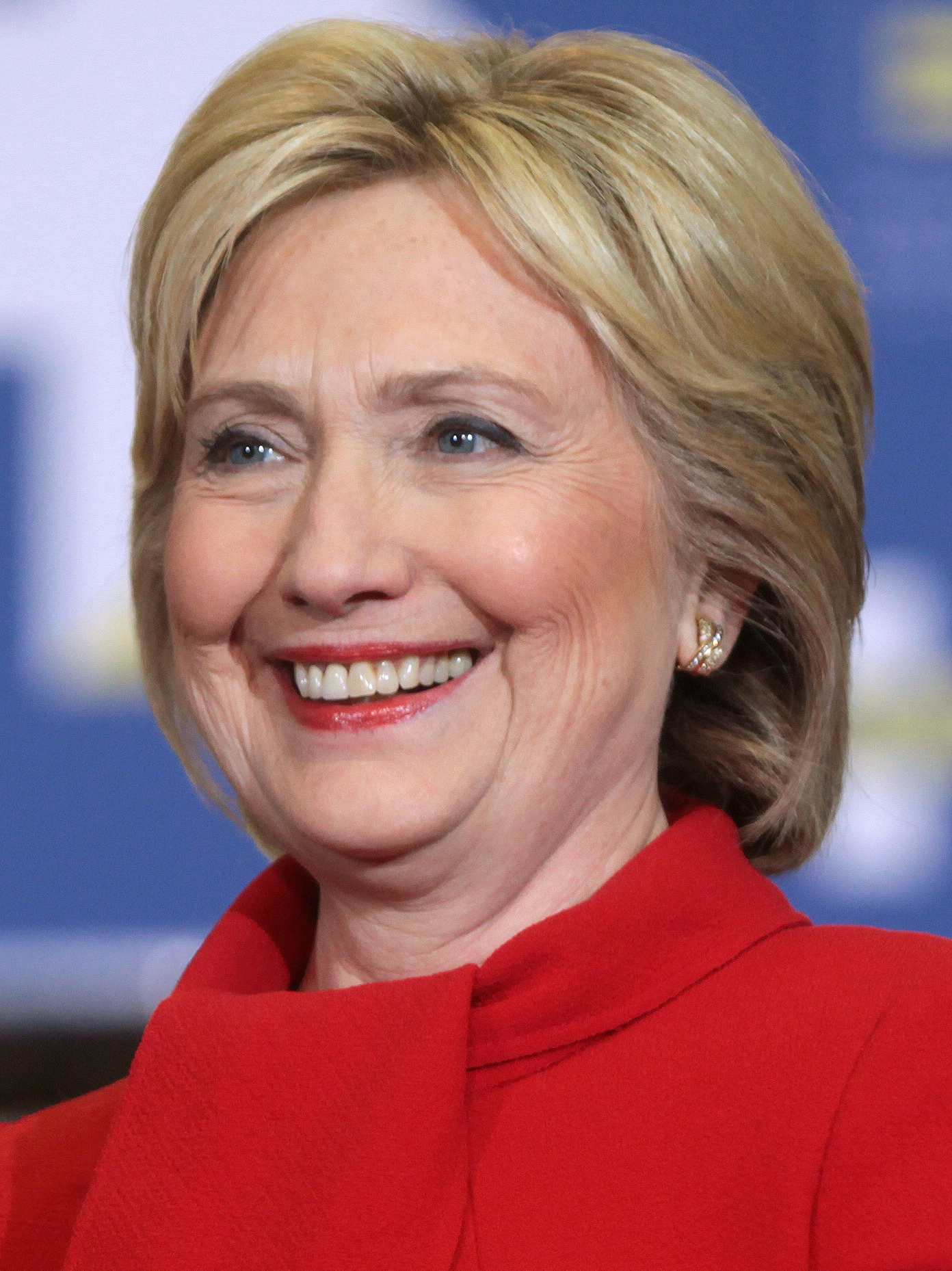

For four years, people have said to me, 'I didn't realize how dangerous (Trump) was,' 'I wish I could go back and do it over,' 'I should have voted.' This can't be another woulda-coulda-shoulda election. If you're voting by mail, request your ballot now, and send it back as soon as you can. If you vote in person, do it early. Bring a friend and wear a mask. Become a poll worker...Remember, Joe and Kamala can win 3 million more votes and still lose. Take it from me. We need numbers so overwhelming Trump can't sneak or steal his way to victory.

— Hillary Clinton at the 2020 Democratic National Convention

Former United States secretary of state and 2016 Democratic presidential nominee Hillary Clinton delivered her speech on the third night of the convention from Chappaqua, New York.

Clinton praised Biden and Harris as, "leaders equal to this moment". She praised Biden's "thoughtfulness and empathy". She praised Harris as a, "daughter of an extraordinary mother", as well as, "relentless in the pursuit of justice, and uncommonly kind."

Clinton, herself a former First Lady of the United States, expressed joy towards Jill Biden's intentions to continue her work as an educator if she becomes First Lady.

Clinton urged voters not to repeat the result of the 2016 election in which Trump had defeated her in the United States Electoral College, thus winning the presidency.

Clinton criticized Trump's presidency, saying, "Remember in 2016 when Trump asked 'What do you have to lose?' Well, now we know. Our health, our jobs, even our lives. Our leadership in the world and, yes, our post office."

Clinton stated that she believes that it is morally wrong that the richest Americans saw their wealth increase during the pandemic while tens of millions of other Americans lost.

Clinton declared, reiterating an African proverb she had helped popularize in the United States, that "it still takes a village". Her speech invoked DREAMers, and reiterated support for Black Lives Matter, while invoking the murders of George Floyd and Ahmaud Arbery, and the killing of Breonna Taylor.

Clinton invoked the struggle for voting rights in the United States. She mentioned that the previous day had marked the centennial of the ratification of the Nineteenth Amendment to the United States Constitution, which granted nationwide women's suffrage. She also invoked John Lewis' participation in the Selma to Montgomery marches fighting against racial injustice, including the disenfranchisement of black voters.

=== Andrew Cuomo ===
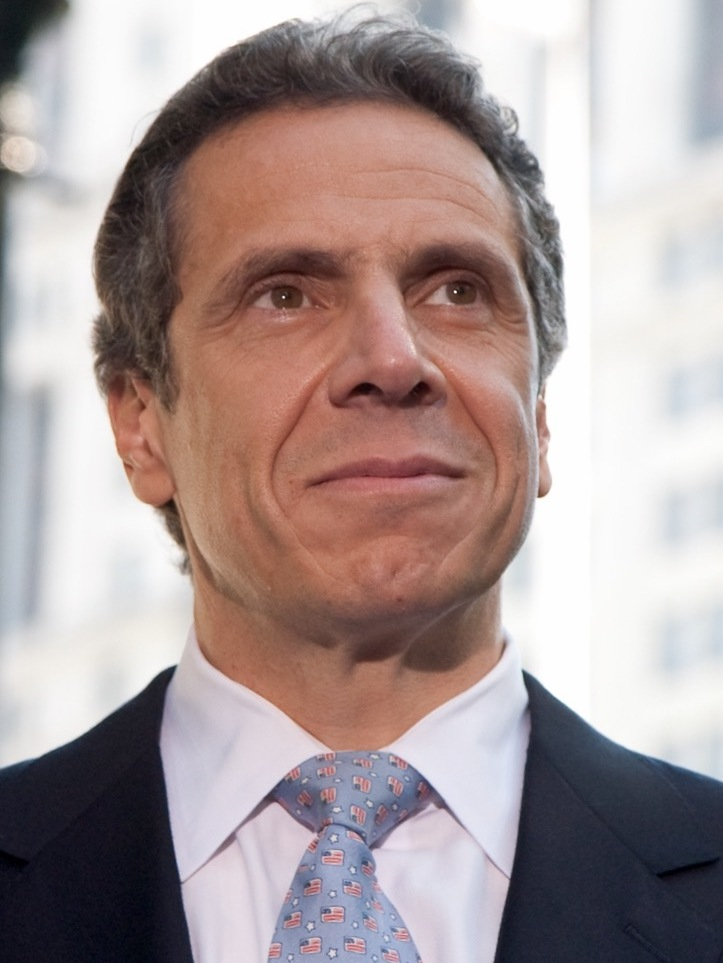

Americans' eyes have been opened, and we have seen in this crisis the truth: that government matters and leadership matters.

— Andrew Cuomo at the 2020 Democratic National Convention

Governor of New York Andrew Cuomo delivered his speech on the opening night of the convention from Albany, New York.

While referencing a number of issues that plagued the nation, Cuomo's speech primarily focused on criticizing President Donald Trump's response to the COVID-19 pandemic.

Cuomo also declared that, "Only a strong body can fight off the virus, and America's divisions weakened it."

=== Brayden Harrington ===
Kids like me are counting on you to elect someone we can all look up to, someone who cares, someone who will make our country and the world feel better. We're counting on you to elect Joe Biden.

— Brayden Harrington at the 2020 Democratic National Convention

Brayden Harrington spoke on the convention's closing night. Harrington, a 13-year-old New Hampshire boy who stutters, spoke about how, on the campaign trail during the primaries, Joe Biden had related to him about his struggles overcoming a stutter of his own, and had shared advice for how to persevere through such an impediment.

Harrington's speech attracted significant attention, being seen as one of the highlights of the convention's final night.

=== Kamala Harris ===
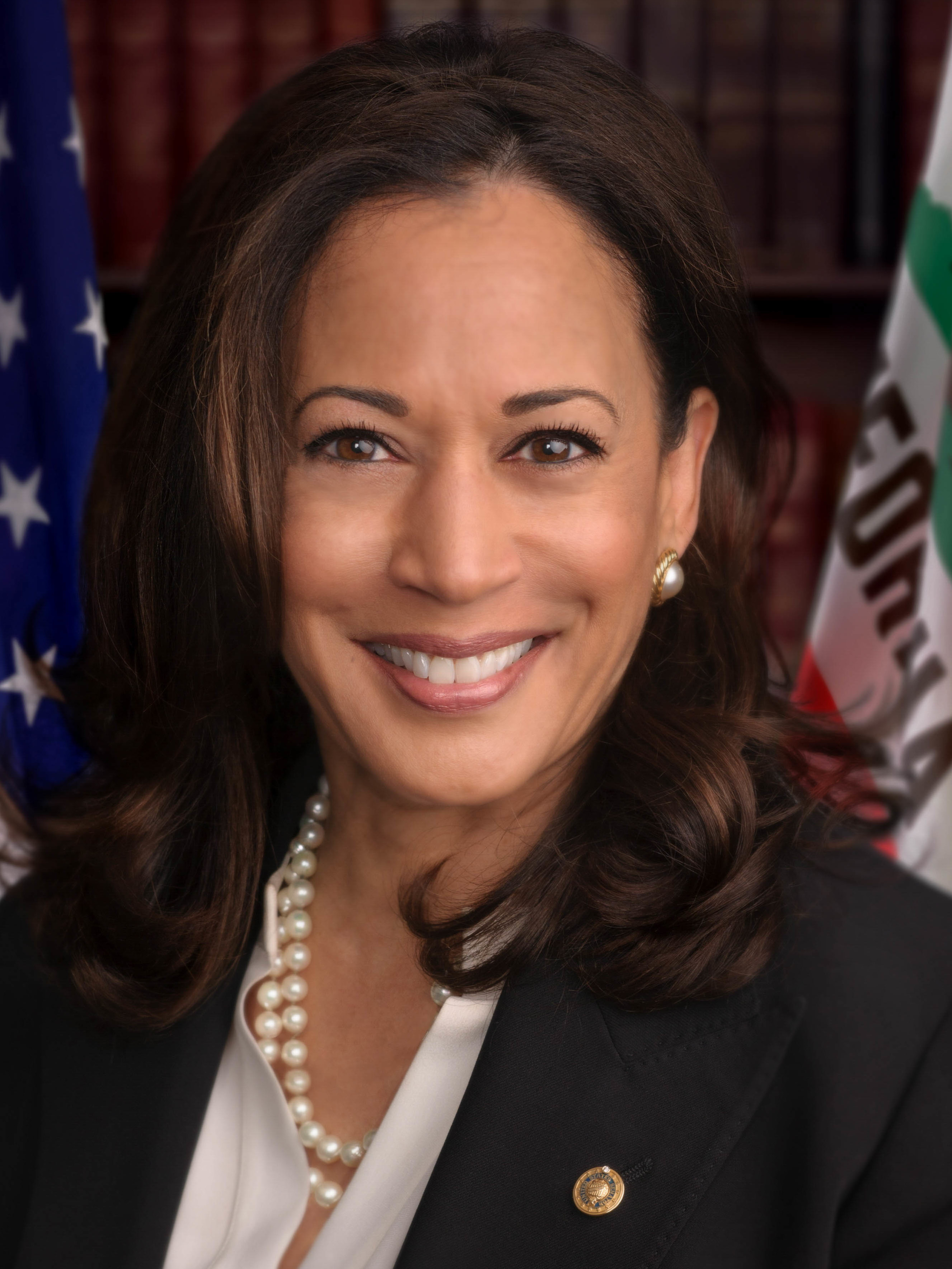

Joe and I believe that we can build that beloved community, one that is strong and decent, just and kind. One in which we all can see ourselves...I pledge to you that we will act boldly and deal with our challenges honestly. We will speak truths. And we will act with the same faith in you that we ask you to place in us.

— Kamala Harris at the 2020 Democratic National Convention

In her vice-presidential nomination acceptance speech on the third night of the convention, Kamala Harris declared that she and Biden will, if elected, tackle issues facing the United States, including racial injustices. Harris provided an autobiographical summary of her life and career.

=== John Kasich ===
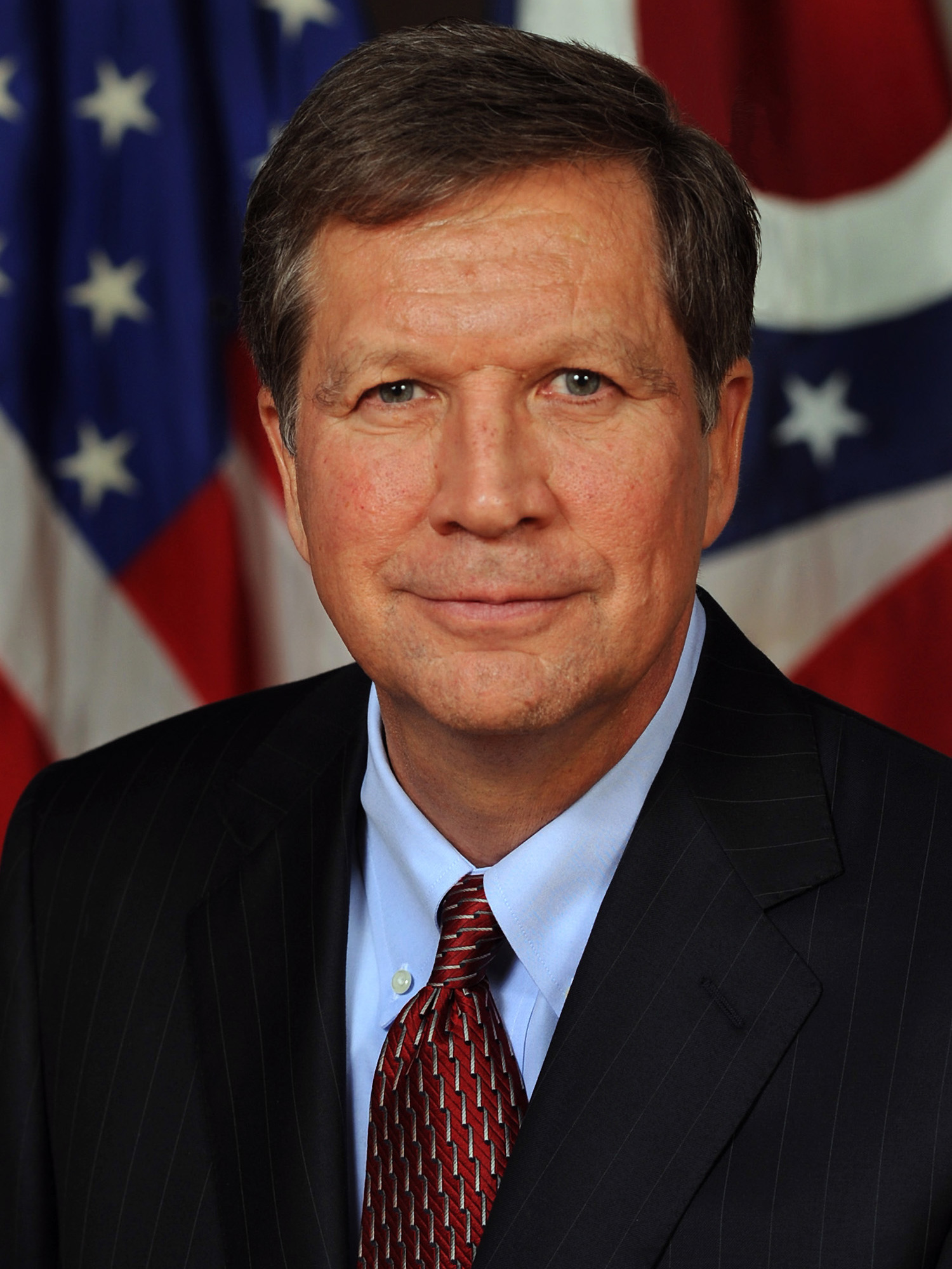

Joe Biden is a man for our times, times that call for all of us to take off our partisan hats and put our nation first.

— John Kasich at the 2020 Democratic National Convention

Republican former governor of Ohio and 2000 and 2016 Republican presidential candidate John Kasich delivered remarks on the opening night of the convention in a pre-recorded video filmed at a road junction near his personal residence in Westerville, Ohio.

Kasich began his speech by declaring that, "America is at a crossroads." While calling himself a, "lifelong Republican", he declared that this came second to his sense of responsibility to the United States, which had compelled him to appear at the convention.

Building on the opening metaphor of America being at a crossroads, as well as the visual metaphor of the speech's physical location at the divergence of two paths, in his closing, Kasich declared that, "When America chooses the right path and pulls together, like we've done so many times before, we can dream big dreams and we can see the top of the mountain as a United States of America, with a soul that is a beacon of freedom to the entire world"

=== John Kerry ===
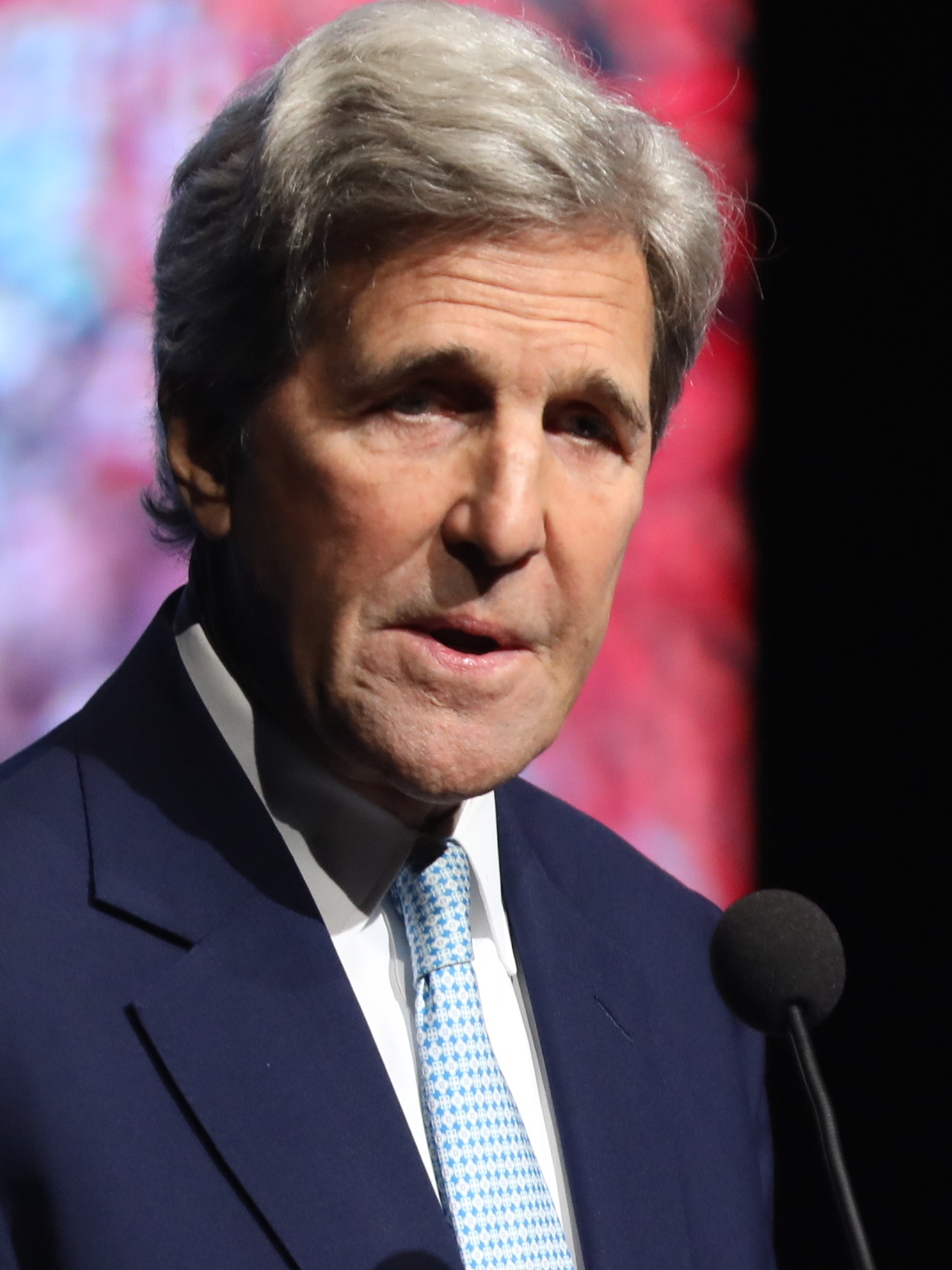

Donald Trump pretends Russia didn't attack our elections. And now, he does nothing about Russia putting a bounty on our troops. So, he won't defend our country, he doesn't know how to defend our troops. The only person he's interested in defending is himself.

— John Kerry at the 2020 Democratic National Convention

On the opening night of the convention, former United States secretary of state and 2004 Democratic presidential nominee John Kerry delivered a speech in Boston, Massachusetts, which heavily criticized Donald Trump's approach foreign policy, characterizing it as a nonstop "blooper reel".

Kerry criticized Trump for denying the existence of Russian interference in the 2016 United States elections, and for what Kerry charged was Trump's failure to protect United States troops from the alleged Russian bounty program.

=== Barack Obama ===
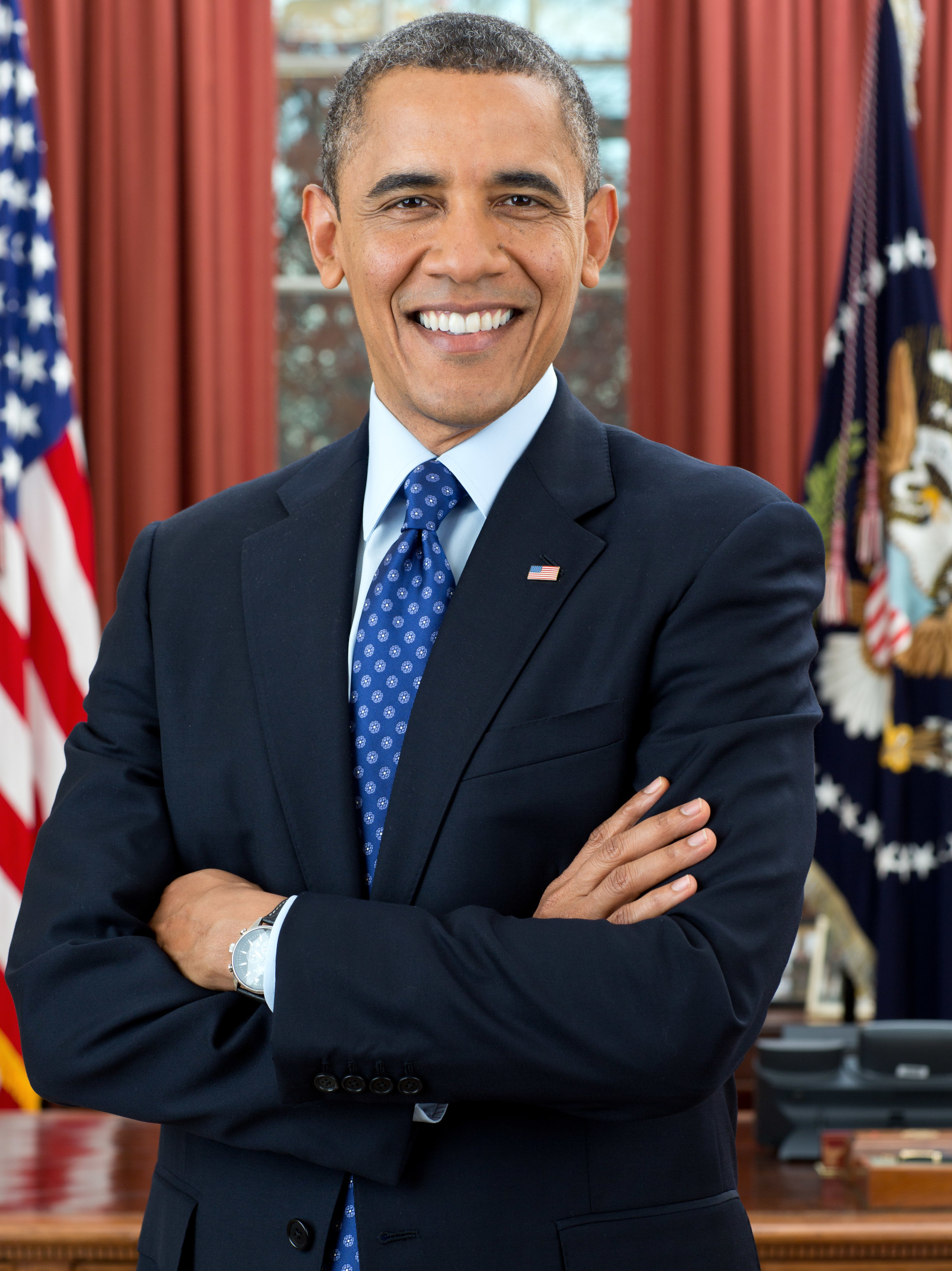

Any chance of success depends entirely on the outcome of this election. This administration has shown it will tear our democracy down if that's what it takes to win. So we have to get busy building it up -- by pouring all our effort into these 76 days, and by voting like never before -- for Joe and Kamala, and candidates up and down the ticket, so that we leave no doubt about what this country we love stands for -- today and for all our days to come.

— Barack Obama at the 2020 Democratic National Convention

Former United States president Barack Obama delivered his speech on the third night of the convention from the Museum of the American Revolution in Philadelphia, Pennsylvania.

During his speech, Obama broke with the customary practice of not criticizing his presidential successor by name.

In his remarks, Obama declared, "Donald Trump hasn't grown into the job because he can't. And the consequences of that failure are severe. 170,000 Americans dead. Millions of jobs gone while those at the top take in more than ever. Our worst impulses unleashed, our proud reputation around the world badly diminished, and our democratic institutions threatened like never before."

=== Michelle Obama ===
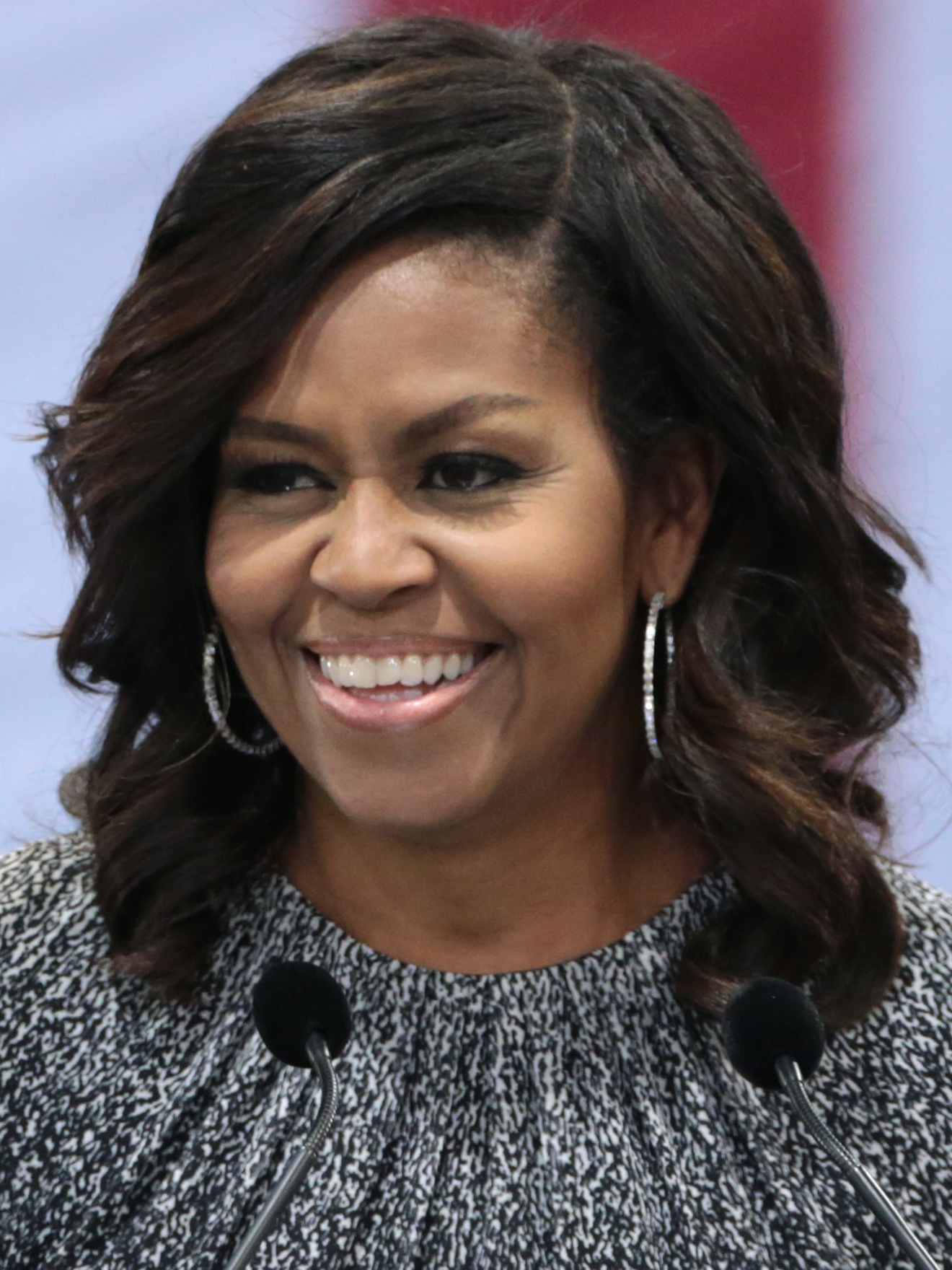

Whenever we look to this White House for some leadership or consolation or any semblance of steadiness, what we get instead is chaos, division, and a total and utter lack of empathy...Let me be as honest and clear as I possibly can. Donald Trump is the wrong president for our country. He has had more than enough time to prove that he can do the job, but he is clearly in over his head. He cannot meet this moment. He simply cannot be who we need him to be for us. It is what it is.

— Michelle Obama at the 2020 Democratic National Convention

Former first lady of the United States Michelle Obama filmed her speech on the opening night of the convention from her personal residence in Martha's Vineyard, Massachusetts.

Obama reaffirmed her conviction in the motto she expressed during her 2016 convention speech, "when they go low, we go high".

Obama declared her belief that, "being president doesn't change who you are; it reveals who you are."

Obama touted what she felt were some the successes of her husband's presidency and Joe Biden's vice presidency, including the Patient Protection and Affordable Care Act, respect for the United States from the international community, and steps made internationally to address climate change. She contrasted these with what she felt were some of the failures of the Trump presidency. She characterized the United States under Trump's leadership as, "underperforming not simply on matters of policy, but on matters of character." One failure she charged Trump with was the United States' death toll and domestic economic damage of the COVID-19 pandemic, for which she faulted Trump's downplaying of the severity of the virus. Another aspect of the Trump presidency she criticized was its reneging on international agreements and its betrayal of alliances that had been championed by past presidents, including Republicans Ronald Reagan and Dwight D. Eisenhower. She also criticized what she regarded to be Trump's emboldening of "torch-bearing white supremacists" seen at the Unite the Right rally. Obama further criticized Trump's derision of the political catchphrase and movement Black Lives Matter.

After declaring Trump an unfit president, Obama remarked, "it is what it is", echoing words that Trump had recently used about the COVID-19 death toll.

Obama directly invoked the murder of George Floyd and killing of Breonna Taylor by law enforcement earlier in 2020, which had become central flash points of ongoing protests and unrest that are considered part of the Black Lives Matter movement.

Obama touted the virtues of Biden's character, declaring him a "profoundly decent man", that, "knows what it takes to rescue an economy, beat back a pandemic, and lead our country." She recounted the personal tragedies that he had endured, including the deaths of his first wife, Neilia, and first-born daughter, Naomi, in a 1972 automobile accident, and the 2015 death of his son Beau from brain cancer, declaring that Biden's "life is a testament to getting back up, and he is going to channel that same grit and passion to pick us all up, to help us heal and guide us forward".

Obama warned of potential voter suppression in the 2020 election, and urged citizens to collectively cast their votes for Biden, "in numbers that cannot be ignored".

In the penultimate sentences of her speech, she quoted John Lewis as saying, "When you see something that is not right, you must say something. You must do something."

=== Nancy Pelosi ===
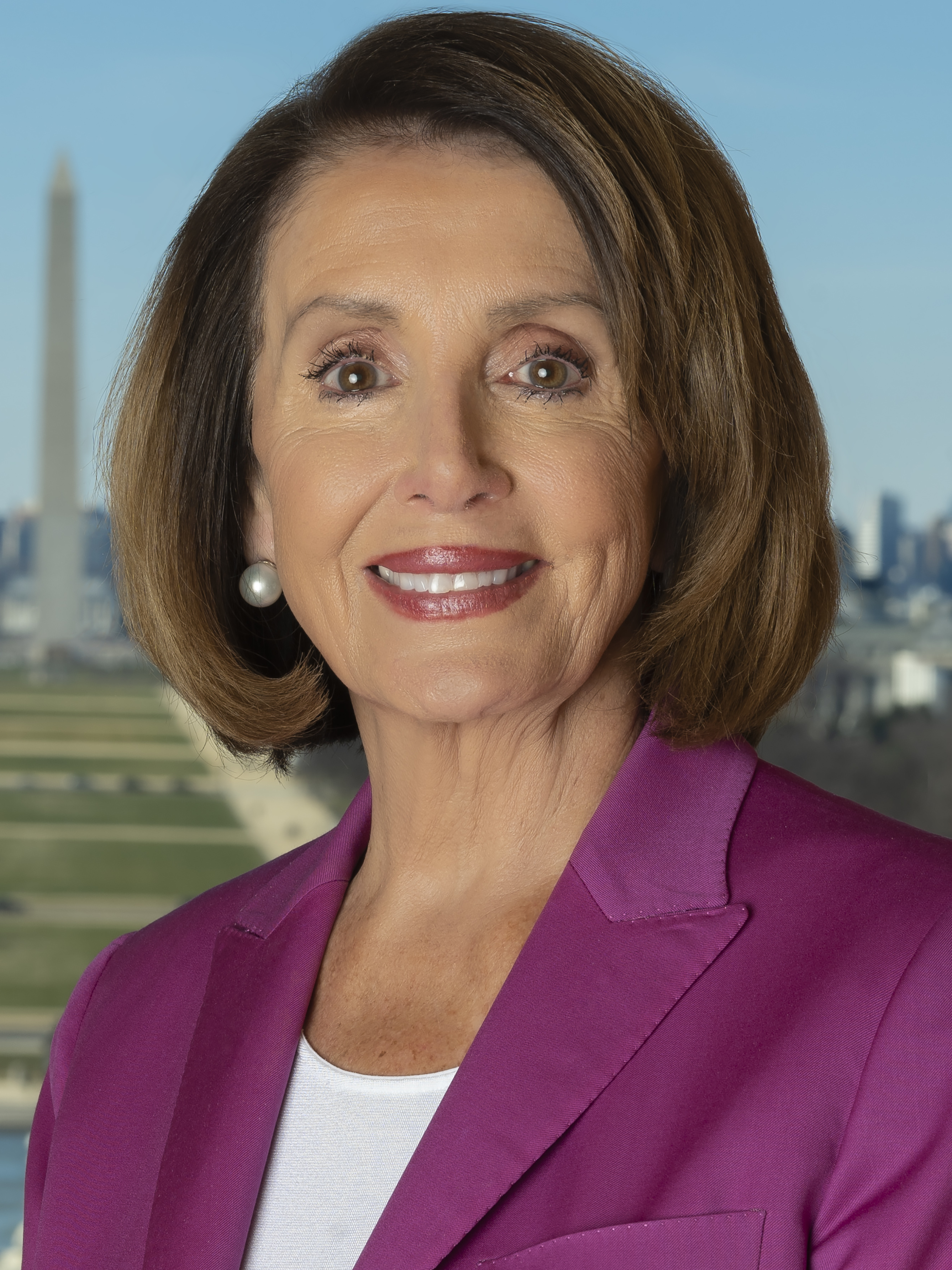

We will elect President Biden, whose heart is full of love for America, and rid the country of Trump's heartless disregard for America's goodness...Our mission and our pledge is to fight for a future equal to the ideals of our founders, our hopes for our children, and the sacrifices of our veterans, our brave men and women in uniform and their families.

— Nancy Pelosi at the 2020 Democratic National Convention

Speaker of the United States House of Representatives Nancy Pelosi delivered her speech on the third night of the convention from San Francisco, California.

Pelosi began her speech by expressing her pride in the diversity of the Democratic majority she was leading in the United States House of Representatives.

In her remarks Pelosi painted President Donald Trump and Republican United States Senate majority leader Mitch McConnell as dual obstacles to progress.

Pelosi praised Biden as, "battle-tested, forward-looking, honest and authentic" and Harris as, "committed to our Constitution, brilliant in defending it".

=== Colin Powell ===
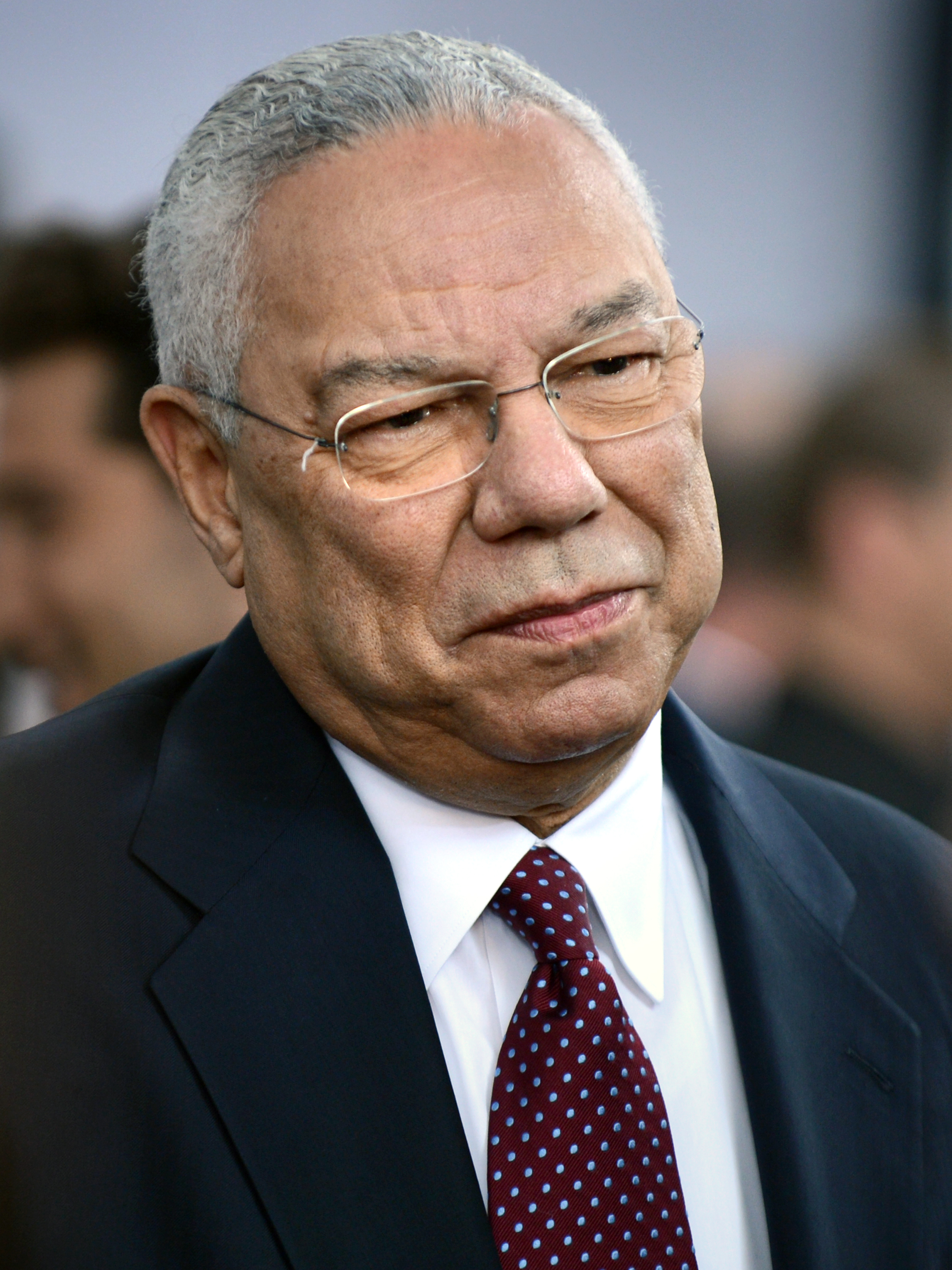

Our country needs a commander in chief who takes care of our troops in the same way he would his own family...Joe Biden will be a president we will all be proud to salute. With Joe Biden in the White House, you will never doubt that he will stand with our friends and stand up to our adversaries...On day one he will restore America's leadership and our moral authority.

— Colin Powell at the 2020 Democratic National Convention

Republican former United States secretary of state Colin Powell delivered his speech on the second night of the convention from Washington, D.C.

Powell opened his speech by briefly recounting the stories of how each of his parents immigrated to the United States from Jamaica.

Powell extolled Biden as having morally strong defining values. Powell praised the sort of leadership he argued that Biden would bring to the United States as president. He argued Biden would, "restore America's leadership in the world and restore the alliances we need to address the dangers that threaten our nation, from climate change to nuclear proliferation."

Powell described the United States as "a country divided", and argued that President Trump was, "doing everything in his power to keep up that way", arguing that Biden would be a unifier as president.

=== Bernie Sanders ===
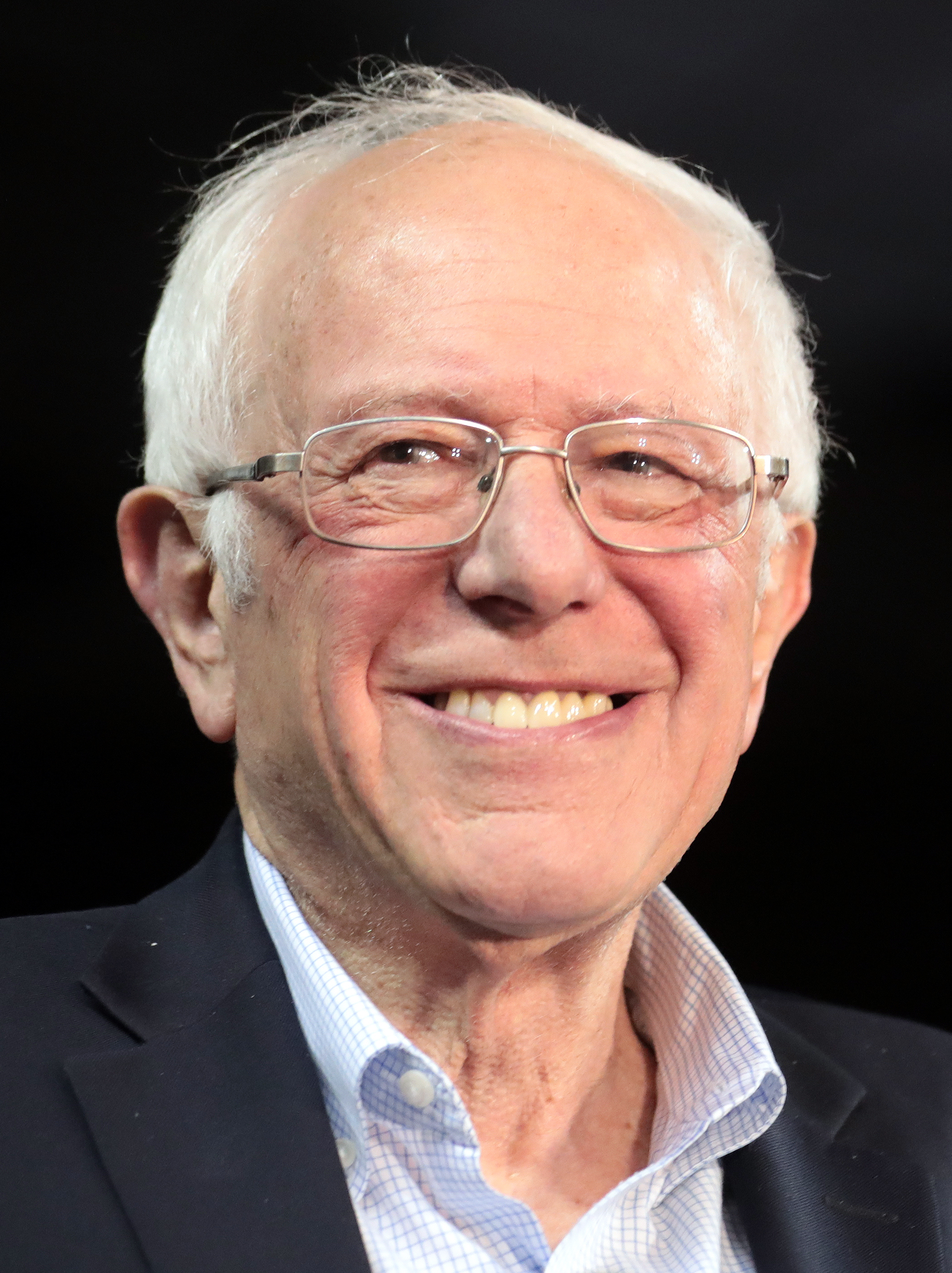

We have a president who is not only incapable of addressing these crises but is leading us down the path of authoritarianism...This election is the most important in the modern history of this country. In response to the unprecedented crises we face, we need an unprecedented response—a movement, like never before, of people who are prepared to stand up and fight for democracy and decency—and against greed, oligarchy, and bigotry. And we need Joe Biden as our next president.

— Bernie Sanders at the 2020 Democratic National Convention

United States senator from Vermont and candidate for the 2016 and 2020 Democratic nominations Bernie Sanders spoke from Burlington, Vermont, on the opening night of the convention.

In his speech, Sanders urged his supporters to lend their support to Biden in order to oust Donald Trump. He conceded that, while he and Biden disagree on the specifics their plans to expand healthcare coverage and lower prescription drug costs, Biden still has a plan that greatly accomplish this. He also touted other issues for which Biden has plans.

=== Chuck Schumer ===
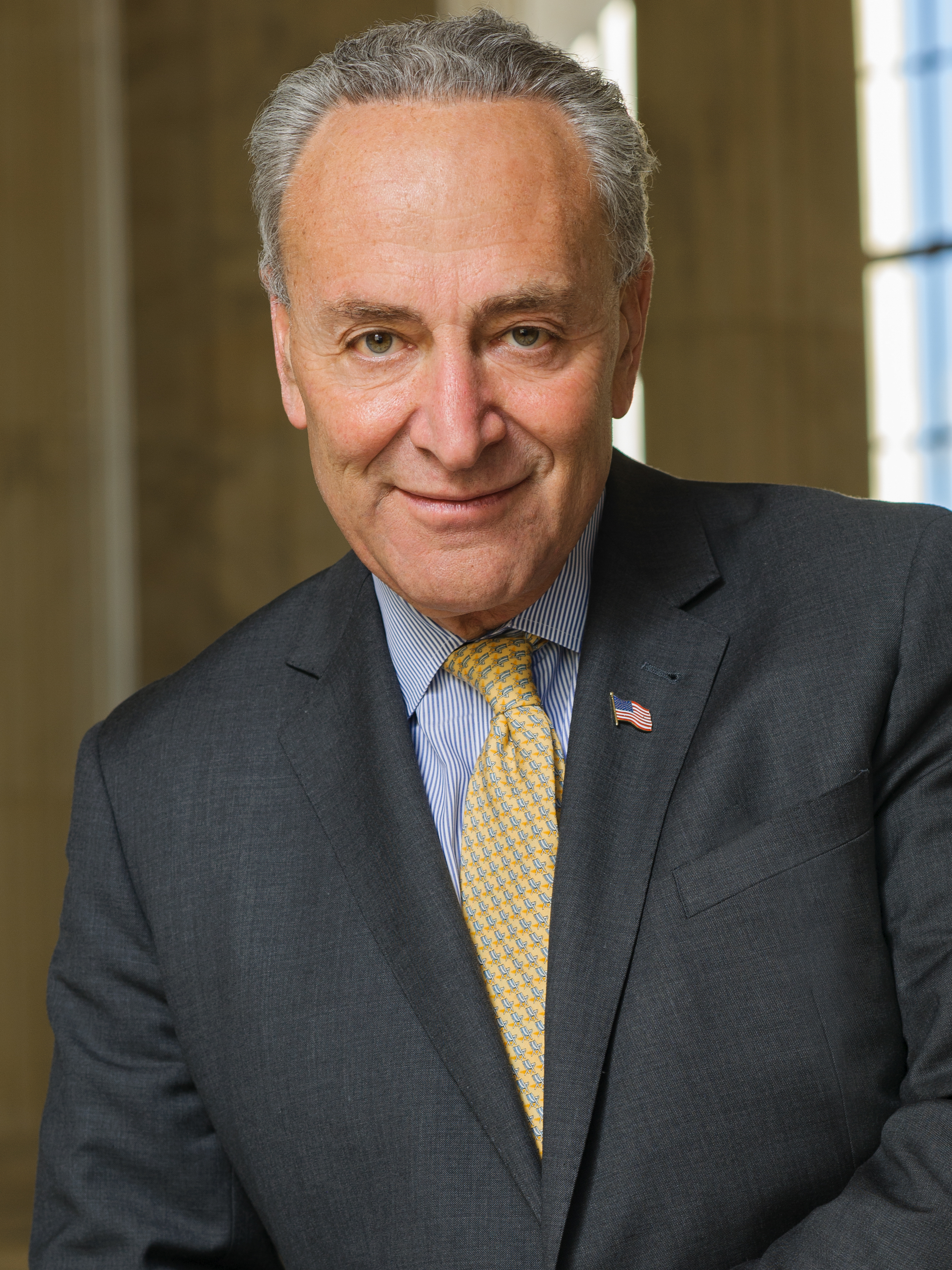

America, Donald Trump has quit on you. We need a president with dignity, integrity, and the experience to lead us out of this crisis, a man with a steady hand and a big heart who will never—ever—quit on America: that man is my friend Joe Biden. He will be a great president.

— Chuck Schumer at the 2020 Democratic National Convention

United States Senate Minority Leader Chuck Schumer delivered his speech on the second night of the convention from the New York City, New York, borough of Brooklyn, with the Statue of Liberty in the background.

Schumer invoked the memory of immigrants, such as his grandparents, who were greeted by the Statue of Liberty upon their arrival in the United States.

Schumer argued that America will benefit from both electing the ticket of Biden and Harris, as well as from flipping control of the United States Senate from Republican to Democratic.

=== Kristin Urquiza ===
My dad was a healthy 65-year-old. His only pre-existing condition was trusting Donald Trump, and for that, he paid with his life...The coronavirus has made it clear that there are two Americas; the America that Donald Trump lives in and the America that my father died in. Enough is enough. Donald Trump may not have caused the coronavirus, but his dishonesty and his irresponsible actions made it so much worse

— Kristin Urquiza at the 2020 Democratic National Convention

On the opening night of the convention, Kristin Urquiza, who had lost her father Mark Urquiza to COVID-19, gave a speech, in which she said that her father, who believed Donald Trump and other Republicans that Urquiza blamed for downplaying the severity of the COVID-19 pandemic, had disregarded his safety and went to a karaoke bar with friends, where he possibly contracted the disease he succumbed to.

Urquiza criticized Trump for "dishonesty" and "irresponsible actions", which she faulted with worsening the pandemic.

Urquiza also said that one of the last things her father, who she said voted for Trump in 2016, had told her before dying was that he "felt betrayed by the likes of Donald Trump", and that she therefore planned to cast her 2020 vote for Joe Biden in honor of her father.

Urquiza's speech was regarded by pundits to be one of the highlights of the convention's opening night.

=== Elizabeth Warren ===
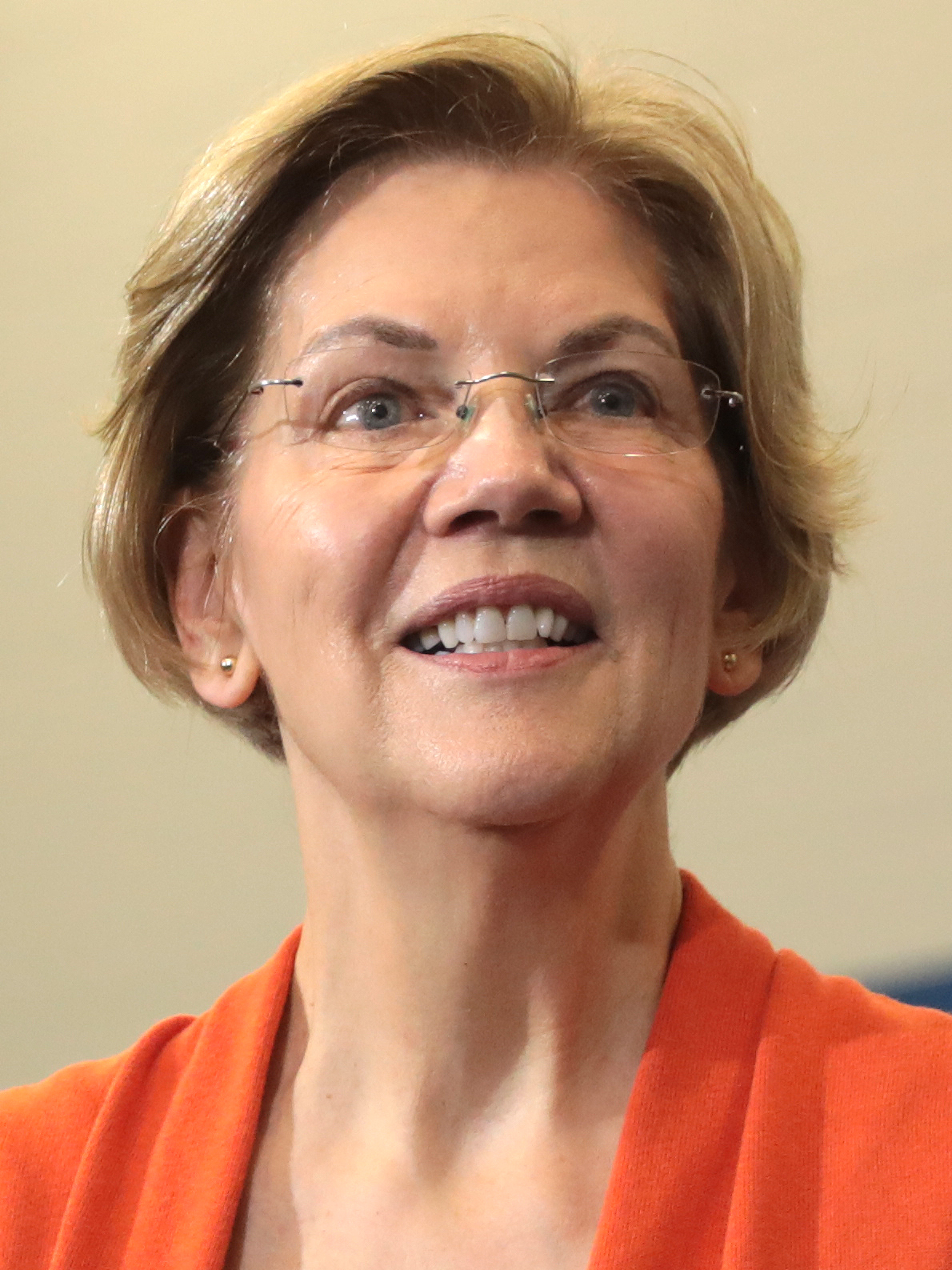

We build infrastructure like roads, bridges and communications systems so that people can work...It's time to recognize that childcare is part of the basic infrastructure of this nation—it's infrastructure for families. Joe and Kamala will make high-quality child care affordable for every family, make preschool universal, and raise the wages for every child care worker.

— Elizabeth Warren at the 2020 Democratic National Convention

United States senator from Massachusetts and candidate for the 2020 Democratic nomination Elizabeth Warren delivered her speech on the third night of the convention from a classroom located in a Springfield, Massachusetts, early learning center that was temporarily closed due to the COVID-19 pandemic. Warren's speech centered on the importance of passing legislation to provide universal child care.

=== Gretchen Whitmer ===
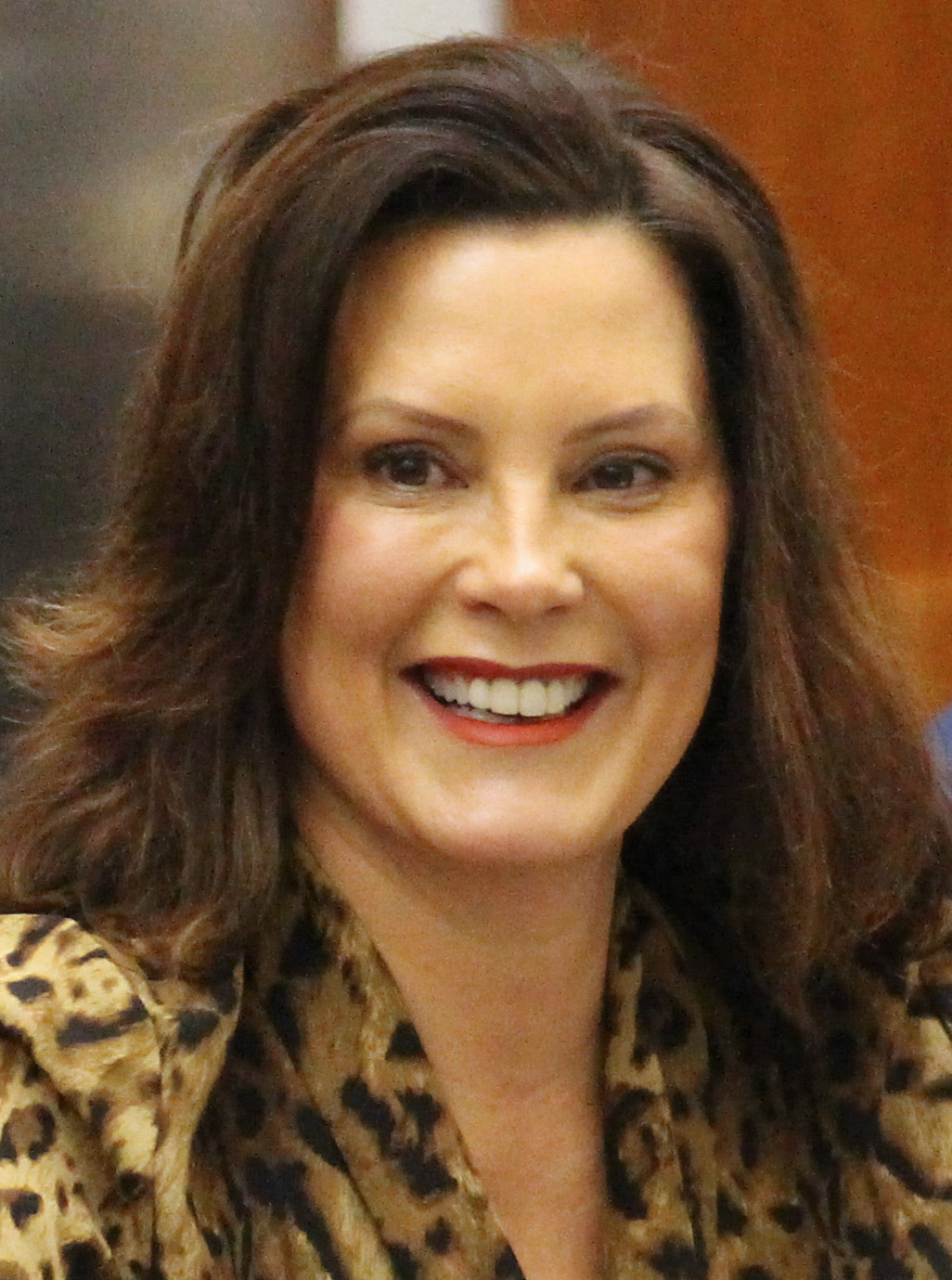

It's crucial that we rally together to fight this virus and build our economy back better...With Joe Biden and Kamala Harris in the White House, we will.

— Gretchen Whitmer at the 2020 Democratic National Convention

Governor of Michigan Gretchen Whitmer delivered her speech on the opening night of the convention from UAW Local 603 in Lansing, Michigan.

Whitmer began by praising Barack Obama and Joe Biden's actions to rescue the auto industry amid its 2008–10 crisis. Whitmer then transitioned into discussing both the Michigan and national responses to the COVID-19 pandemic. She argued that Biden and Harris would provide the leadership needed to address the pandemic.

=== Keynote address (various speakers) ===
Aiming to have a "new kind of convention keynote", the Democratic Party chose to have seventeen "rising stars" co-present the convention's keynote address. The speakers were former minority leader of the Georgia House of Representatives and 2018 Georgia gubernatorial nominee Stacey Abrams (who had a solo spotlight capping the section); Tennessee state senator Raumesh Akbari; United States representative Colin Allred of Texas; United States representative Brendan Boyle of Pennsylvania; Nevada state senator Yvanna Cancela; former Ohio State representative Kathleen Clyde; Florida commissioner of agriculture Nikki Fried; Mayor of Long Beach, California, Robert Garcia; Pennsylvania state representative Malcolm Kenyatta; South Carolina state senator Marlon Kimpson; United States representative Conor Lamb of Pennsylvania, Michigan state representative Mari Manoogian; Texas state representative Victoria Neave; president of the Navajo Nation Jonathan Nez; Georgia state representative Sam Park; New Hampshire state representative Dennis Ruprecht; and mayor of Birmingham, Alabama, Randall Woodfin. This made Malcolm Kenyatta, Sam Park, and Robert Garcia the first openly gay speakers in a keynote slot at a Democratic National Convention. It also made Sam Park the first Korean-American to be part of a national party convention keynote address.

Garcia, Kenyatta, and Park became the first openly LGBTQ speakers to deliver a keynote address at a Democratic National Convention, with all three being openly-gay men.

Petula Dvorak of The Washington Post called the speech the "most realistic convention speech ever". Adam Harris of The Atlantic opined that the speech "fell flat".

Keynote speakers (in alphabetical order)

Speaker	Position/notability
Stacey Abrams	Former Minority Leader of the Georgia House of Representatives and 2018 Georgia gubernatorial nominee
Raumesh Akbari	Tennessee State Senator
Colin Allred	United States Representative from Texas
Brendan Boyle	United States Representative from Pennsylvania
Yvanna Cancela	Nevada State Senator
Kathleen Clyde	Ohio State Representative
Nikki Fried	Florida Commissioner of Agriculture
Robert Garcia	Mayor of Long Beach, California
Malcolm Kenyatta	Pennsylvania State Representative
Marlon Kimpson	South Carolina State Senator
Conor Lamb	United States Representative from Pennsylvania
Mari Manoogian	Michigan State Representative
Victoria Neave	Texas State Representative
Jonathan Nez	President of the Navajo Nation
Sam Park	Georgia State Representative
Dennis Ruprecht	New Hampshire State Representative
Randall Woodfin	Mayor of Birmingham, Alabama

== Closing fireworks display ==
After Biden's acceptance speech, the convention closed with Biden and Harris proceeding to exit the Chase Center on the Riverfront to grace a stage outside of the venue. There, they waved to a drive-in audience that had watched a broadcast of the speech from approximately 360 cars. The crowd greeted the nominees with cheers and the honking of their car horns. A five-minute fireworks display was then orchestrated before this audience to conclude the convention.

== Demonstrations and protests ==
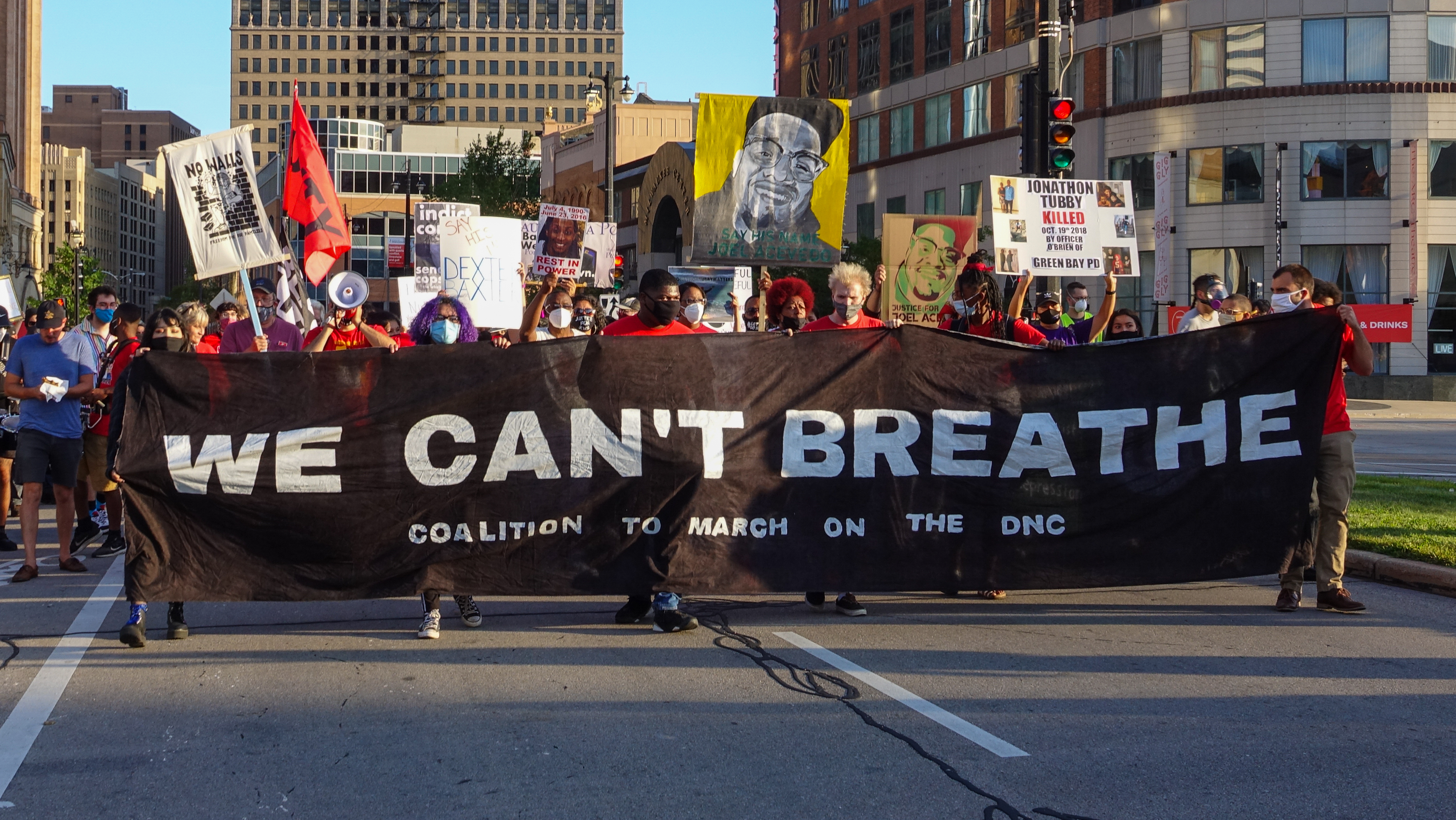
August 20 protest organized by the Coalition to March on the DNC

There were some demonstrations and protests held outside of the convention venue in Milwaukee.

Several groups scheduled protests in Milwaukee during the convention. Ryan Hamann, co-chair of the "Coalition to March on the DNC" stated that his coalition's planned protests would focus on police reform, in effect being a continuance of the nationwide George Floyd protests.

On August 2, the City of Milwaukee reported that very little interest had been indicated by parties in seeking permits to either organize a downtown parade or a speech in a downtown park.

Club Kids Inc. was scheduled to hold a permitted parade in Milwaukee at noon CDT on August 17. The Women's Human Rights Campaign was scheduled to hold a permitted parade in Milwaukee on August 20 at 10 A.M. CDT.

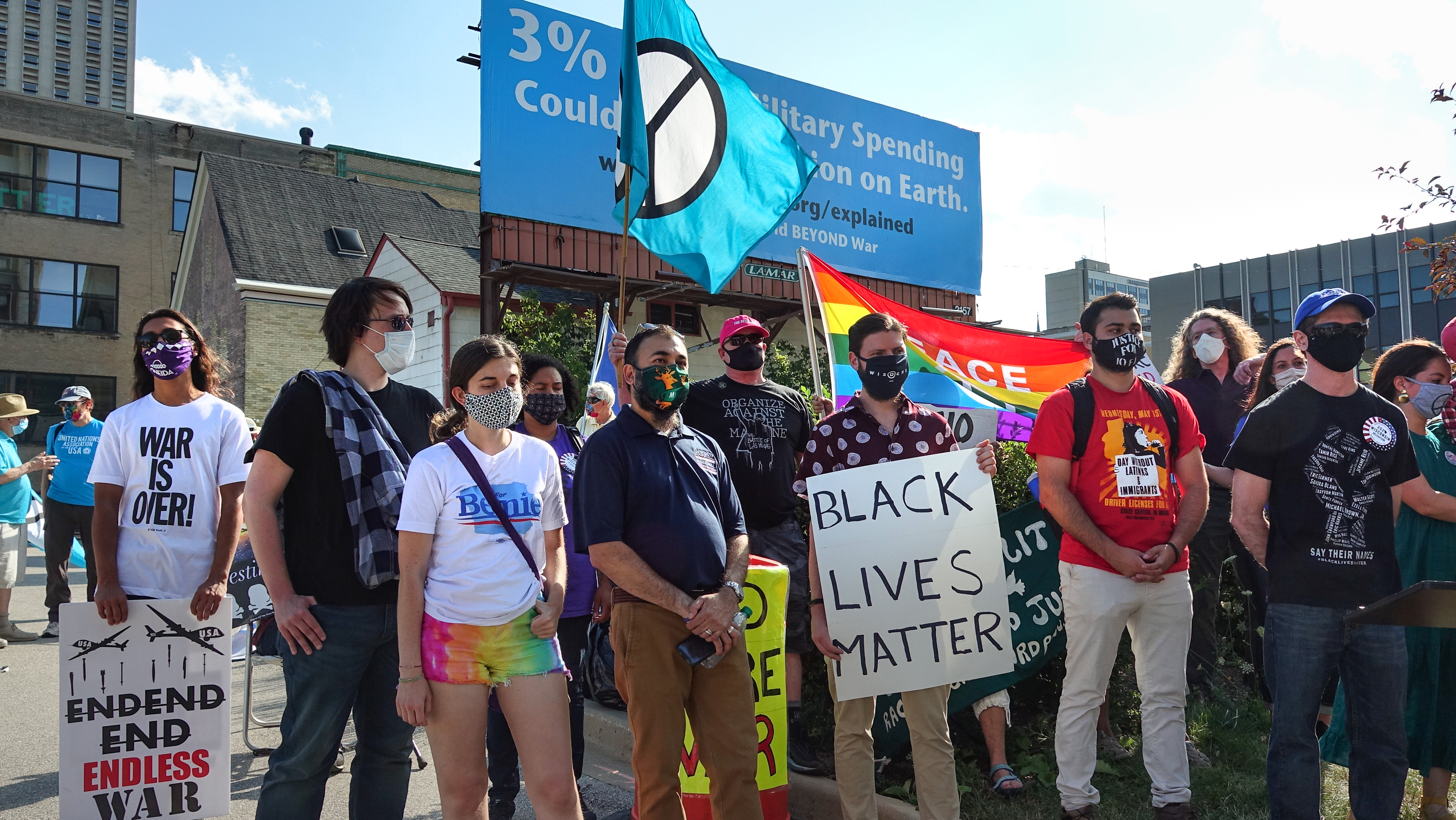
DNC Delegates United for Peace protest

One day before the opening of the convention, the "DNC Delegates United for Peace" protest saw protesters, including convention delegates, protest in Milwaukee against war and military spending.

Other groups protesting in Milwaukee included Democrats for Life of America.

The Trump campaign held counter-events in Wisconsin during the convention. The campaign officially held a "Women for Trump" campaign event in Pleasant Prairie the day before the start of the convention. Additionally, the White House held multiple events in Wisconsin, which included one event in Oshkosh, Wisconsin, on the opening day of the convention, and another in Milwaukee itself the third day of the convention, with the first event featuring President Donald Trump and the latter event featuring Vice President Mike Pence. The presence of a Trump event caused the Coalition to March on the DNC to alter their plans for Monday and protest outside of the Trump event rather than outside of the convention itself.

There were protests outside of the Chase Center on the Riverfront in Wilmington, with over 100 pro-Trump demonstrators assembling a few hours prior to Biden's acceptance speech and electronic message trucks driving around the site criticizing Biden's alleged sexual assault of a former aide. The trucks were paid for Turning Point Action.

== Broadcast and media coverage ==
For previous recent conventions, domestic 24-hour cable news channels broadcast wall-to-wall coverage of day-long proceedings. However, during the Democratic and Republican conventions of 2016, the length of prime time coverage provided by the "Big Three" domestic television networks was also one hour per night . The 2020 convention was slimmed down from previous iterations in terms of the length of television programming it provided, with only two hours of televised events taking place on each night of the convention.

In 2020, PBS, C-SPAN and domestic 24-hour cable news channels including CNN and MSNBC all broadcast both hours of each night of the Democratic Party convention. However, Fox News and the big three domestic television networks (ABC, CBS, and NBC) only broadcast the last hour of each night. A number of domestic cable news channels and internet news platforms and streaming video news channels also aired further coverage of the convention in addition to the two hours of the convention itself. PBS, for example, aired an additional hour of commentary. In addition to the main convention broadcast, other media coverage opportunities were had been made available to the press by the convention organizers and the Biden campaign, including remote press briefings and interviews.

Broadcasters pooled their resources and shrank their footprints at the convention. The convention organizers worked with both the network pool and the congressional press galleries to establish pooled media opportunities. There was more of a reliance by broadcasters on footage from press pool cameras than at past conventions. As the convention initially began to downsize, networks moved to agree to plans to utilize a single shared camera feed of the convention's stage. As with past conventions, the convention organizers made a feed of convention proceedings available for free to media organizations.

After the downsizing, but even before it was announced that Biden and other speakers would no longer travel to Milwaukee, many broadcasters had already substantially scaled back plans to send reporters to the city, or had planned to forgo sending reporters to the city altogether. By July 29, Fox News was the only broadcaster confirmed to be sending correspondents to the convention hall itself.

=== Official streams and watch parties ===
In addition to coverage by broadcasters, there is a stream broadcast by the DNC itself on fifteen platforms. These platforms are the convention's website, YouTube, Facebook, Twitter, Twitch, Amazon Prime Video, Microsoft Bing, Apple TV, Roku TV, Amazon Fire TV, AT&T U-verse, DirecTV, Comcast Xfinity X1, Comcast Xfinity Flex, and Amazon Alexa.

In addition, the Biden campaign scheduled numerous virtual watch parties during the convention which showed a stream of the convention, with a number of them being hosted by prominent politicians and celebrities. Some outdoor socially-distanced watch parties were hosted by Democratic Party organizations, such as one for Connecticut convention delegates to attend at Dunkin' Donuts Park in Hartford. There were additionally drive-in watch parties held by Democratic Party organizers, including one right outside the Chase Center on the Riverfront on the night Biden accepted his nomination there.

== Impact ==
The convention was regarded to have been largely successful.

=== Lack of a convention bounce ===
The first polls conducted after the Democratic National Convention showed no convention bounce for Biden. Later polling, conducted after the Republican National Convention concluded the following week, indicated that there had been virtually no convention bounce for either party coming out of August conventions held in back-to-back weeks.

Ahead of, and during, the conventions, various outlets had speculated that significant convention bounces were unlikely for either party. This was due to several cited factors. One was that it had been observed that convention bounces had been more minuscule in recent elections. Per some calculations, convention bounces had averaged just 2 points since 2004, compared to just under 7 points between 1968 and 2000. Per other calculations, average bounces since 1996 averaged 3.6 points, while bounces between 1962 and 1992 averaged 6.3 points. Another factor cited for why it was seen as unlikely for either party to generate a significant convention bounce was that polls in the 2020 race had, in the months prior to the convention, shown a remarkably steady race, with Biden maintaining an average lead of 6 points, exceeding a 10-point lead in some polls and never slipping below a lead of 4 points in the polling average. It has been shown that more stable races tend to see smaller convention bounces. Another was that the conventions, having been scaled-back due to the COVID-19 pandemic, were seen as less likely to generate as much attention as past conventions had, particularly due to the decrease in television viewership . Another was that the electorate was already strongly opinionated on the candidates, with more voters holding a strong opinion on Trump than any incumbent since at least 1980, and more voters holding a strong opinion on Biden than any challenger to an incumbent since at least 1980. Races where voters hold strong opinions on the candidates tend to see smaller convention bounces. Strong partisanship among the electorate was another cited factor.

The Democrats were also seen as having factors which the Republican convention did not that might hamper its chances at a convention bump. One was that the Republicans would hold their convention immediately following them. Additionally, the fact that Biden already had a large lead among independents heading into the convention possibly made Biden particularly unlikely to experience a convention bounce, as some speculated that Biden may have already been near his likely ceiling of support.

While his electoral poll numbers may not have received a bounce, some polling showed Biden to have received a boost in favorability ratings.

== See also ==
- 2020 Democratic Party presidential primaries
- 2020 Republican National Convention
- 2020 Libertarian National Convention
- 2020 Green National Convention
- 2020 Constitution Party National Convention
- 2020 United States presidential election
- Impact of the COVID-19 pandemic on politics

== Notes ==
Preceded by 2016; Philadelphia, Pennsylvania	Democratic National Conventions	Succeeded by 2024; Chicago, Illinois
