= Fabian Doñate =

American politician

Member of the Nevada Senate from the 10th District
- Incumbent
- Assumed office February 2, 2021
- Preceded by: Yvanna Cancela

Personal details
- Party: Democratic
- Education: University of Nevada at Las Vegas; University of Maryland

Fabian Doñate is an American politician in the Nevada Senate from Nevada's 10th district. He was appointed to the seat after incumbent Democrat Yvanna Cancela resigned to join the Biden administration.
