= Logistics of the 2020 Republican National Convention =

- 2020 Republican National Convention
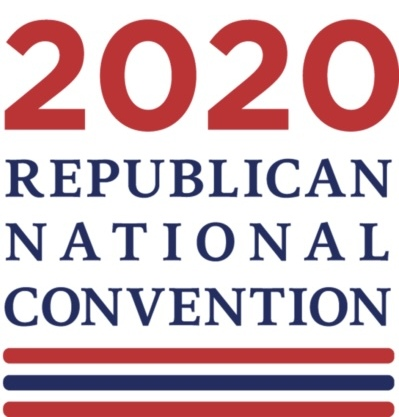
- Wordmark, which was a component of the initial logo used for advance promotion of the convention

Convention
- Date(s): August 24–27, 2020
- City: Charlotte, North Carolina (day 1); Washington, D.C. and various locations remotely (days 1–4)
- Convention hall: Charlotte Convention Center (day 1); Andrew W. Mellon Auditorium and various locations remotely (days 1–4)
- Convention hall type: auditorium
- Other significant venues: Fort McHenry (in Baltimore); White House
- Held before or after DNC?: after
- NSSE designation?: yes

The 2020 Republican National Convention was held from August 24 to 27, 2020. Due to the COVID-19 pandemic in the United States, plans to convene a traditional large-scale convention were cancelled a few weeks before the convention. Primary venues of the downscaled convention that was instead staged included the Charlotte Convention Center in Charlotte, North Carolina, and the Andrew W. Mellon Auditorium in Washington, D.C., with many other remote venues also being utilized.

The convention was originally scheduled to be held at the Spectrum Center in Charlotte, North Carolina, but on June 2, 2020, President Donald Trump (who was to be renominated at the convention) and the Republican National Committee jointly decided to pull the event from Charlotte after the North Carolina state government declined to agree to Trump's demands to allow the convention to take place with a full crowd and without public health measures designed to prevent the spread of the COVID-19 pandemic, such as social distancing and face coverings. Trump then announced that the convention would be moved to Jacksonville, Florida, but subsequently cancelled the Jacksonville convention plans on July 23. Official business proceedings of the convention were still staged in Charlotte, albeit dramatically reduced in scale, while the remainder of the convention was centered in Washington, D.C. Most speeches were delivered at Washington, D.C.'s Andrew W. Mellon Auditorium. In contrast to most conventions, the majority of speeches were prerecorded. Some aspects of the convention were held remotely at various locations (such as Fort McHenry and the White House), including the acceptance speeches by nominees Trump and Pence, as well as speeches by their wives.

== Dates of convention ==
The convention was held August 24–27, 2020. A decades-long "gentlemen's agreement" between the two parties has held that the party of the incumbent president holds its convention at a later date than the other party, By this tradition, because Republicans held the presidency, their convention was conducted after the 2020 Democratic National Convention, which was held from August 17–20.

Democrats had initially scheduled their convention to be held July 13–16. This was prior to the scheduled dates for the (ultimately postponed) 2020 Summer Olympics. As Summer Olympics are a major event that attracts tremendous public attention, the major parties schedule their presidential so as not to overlap with the Olympics.Republicans then scheduled their convention for dates that were shortly after the planned close of the Olympics. While, due to the pandemic, Democrats delayed their convention to August, their new date still honored the tradition of the incumbent party holding its convention at a later date than the non-incumbent party..

== Initial plans for a convention in Charlotte ==
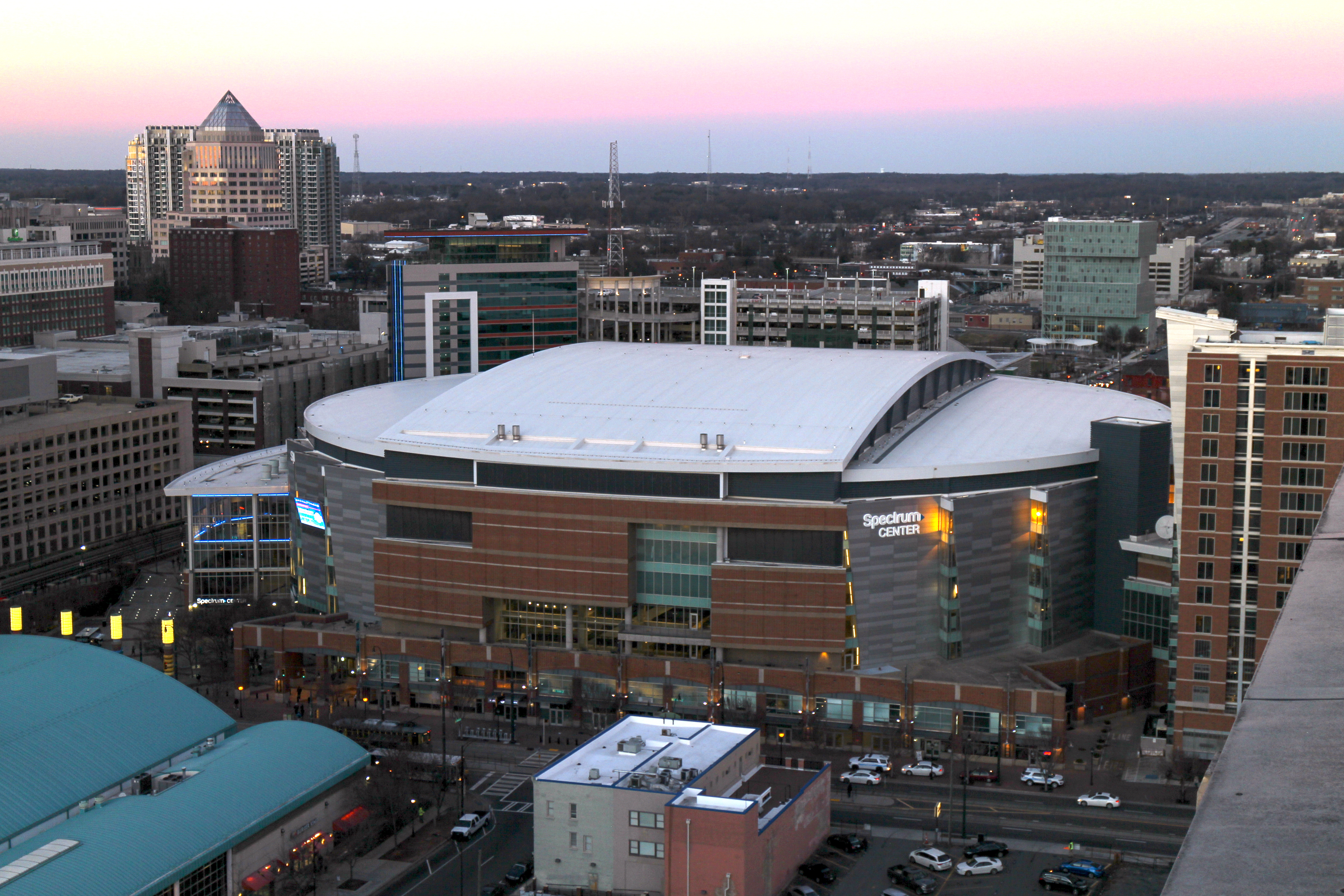
The Spectrum Center in Charlotte, North Carolina, was originally to be the site of the convention.

=== Site selection ===
Las Vegas, Nevada, and Charlotte, North Carolina, were mentioned as possible locations for the 2020 RNC due to their locations within "swing states." Neither had ever hosted a Republican National Convention, although Charlotte had hosted the 2012 Democratic National Convention. A Charlotte television station, WBTV, reported that Charlotte, Las Vegas, and "another unnamed city in Texas, which sources at the meeting said were likely either Dallas or San Antonio" were finalists to host the convention. Other sources named Dallas, Texas, and New York City, New York, as prospective hosts, while Las Vegas, Nevada; Nashville, Tennessee; Philadelphia, Pennsylvania; and San Antonio, Texas had been under consideration earlier. However, Charlotte was the only city in the country to officially submit a bid for the convention. On July 18, 2018, the RNC Site Selection Committee voted unanimously to recommend holding the convention in Charlotte. The Republican National Committee made the selection official on July 20.

Following President Trump's rally in Greenville, North Carolina, the Charlotte City Council proposed retracting their bid to host the convention. All nine Democrats on the city council voted on a measure calling Trump a racist for his statement ("good people on both sides" of the statue debate). The city met in closed sessions with an attorney regarding their contract to host the convention. A conclusion was made that breaking the contract would likely end with the city being taken to court and forced to host the convention. A resolution was eventually approved by the Charlotte City Council.

=== Charlotte host committee ===
Charlotte businessman John Lassiter served as the president and CEO of the Charlotte 2020 Host Committee. Ned Curran, Doug Lebda, and Walter Price served as co-chairs, and were named to those positions in 2018.

The host committee appointed Stephanie Batsell as its volunteer coordinator, John Burleson as its communications director, Heather Dodgins as its director of donor engagement, Haley Habenicht as its events manager, Rachel Kelley as its finance director, and Stephanie Speers as its accounting manager.

The committee released a statement after most of the convention had shifted to Jacksonville criticizing the Republican National Committee for "broken promises".

The committee originally reported raising $44 million for the convention. Due to the majority of the event being shifted away from Charlotte, the Charlotte host committee had millions in leftover funds which it could distribute with few restrictions. The committee originally promised in mid-August to give $3.2 million in funds to local nonprofits and community groups. However, by October, they had only distributed under $400,000 in funds.

=== Withdrawal of convention hub from Charlotte ===
On June 2, 2020, President Donald Trump (who was to be renominated at the convention) and the Republican National Committee jointly decided to pull the event from Charlotte after the North Carolina state government declined to agree to Trump's demands to allow the convention to take place with a full crowd and without public health measures designed to prevent the spread of the COVID-19 pandemic, such as social distancing and face coverings. Trump chose to relocate the convention to another state, in hopes of circumventing North Carolina's pandemic health restrictions so that Trump could be re-nominated in front of a full-scale in-person convention crowd.

== Plans for a convention in Jacksonville ==
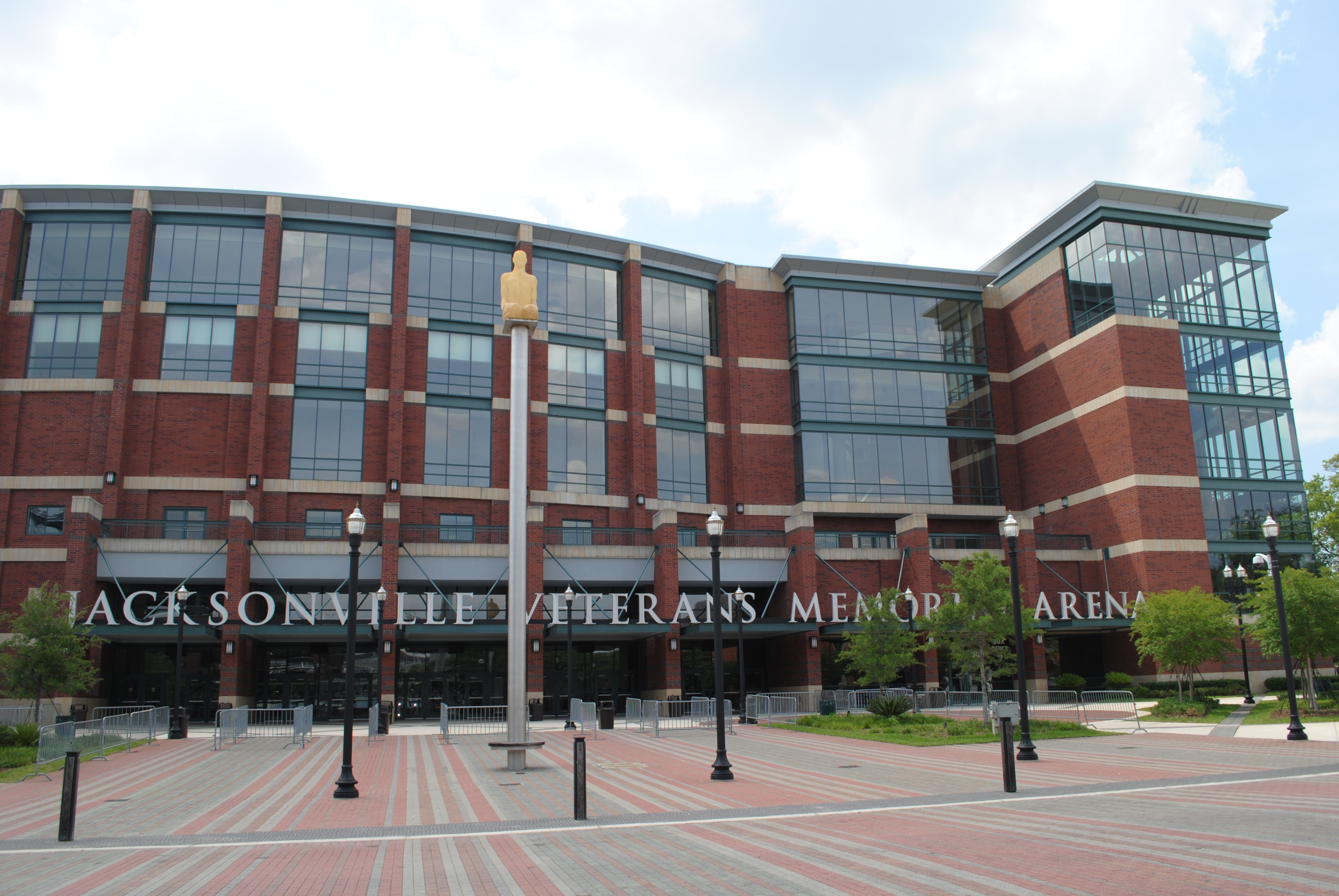
The VyStar Veterans Memorial Arena in Jacksonville, Florida, was to have been the main site of the 2020 Republican National Convention when plans were shifted to a Jacksonville-based convention.

On May 25, 2020, Trump raised the possibility of moving the convention out of Charlotte after North Carolina governor Roy Cooper stated that the convention would need to be scaled down due to the COVID-19 pandemic. On June 2, 2020, after weeks of failed negotiations, Governor Cooper rejected the plans submitted by the Republican Party to host a full-scale convention. Trump announced the cancellation via tweet, stating, "Because of [Cooper], we are now forced to seek another state to host the 2020 Republican National Convention."

On June 11, the Republican National Committee confirmed that the main events and speeches of the convention would move to Jacksonville, Florida, including Trump's nomination acceptance speech on August 27 at the VyStar Veterans Memorial Arena. However the convention's official business was to remain in Charlotte with a greatly reduced agenda and number of delegates. August 24 was to see a portion of the convention hosted in Charlotte, with the following three days of the convention being held in Jacksonville.

=== Cancellation of Jacksonville plans ===
With the explosion of COVID-19 cases in Florida (peaking at above 15,000 new cases per day in mid-July), the possibility of the Jacksonville convention being canceled as well began to be discussed. Several of the local health restrictions in Charlotte that had prompted the RNC to seek a different location—requirements for people to wear masks and practice social distancing—were later adopted by Jacksonville. Sen. Chuck Grassley, who was 86 years old, said he would skip the convention for the first time in 40 years due to the risk of COVID-19.

On July 23, Trump announced that RNC events scheduled in Jacksonville, Florida, had been cancelled, saying, "The timing for the event is not right." However, Trump also announced that delegate business would still continue in Charlotte.

== Relocation of most convention activity to Washington, D.C. ==
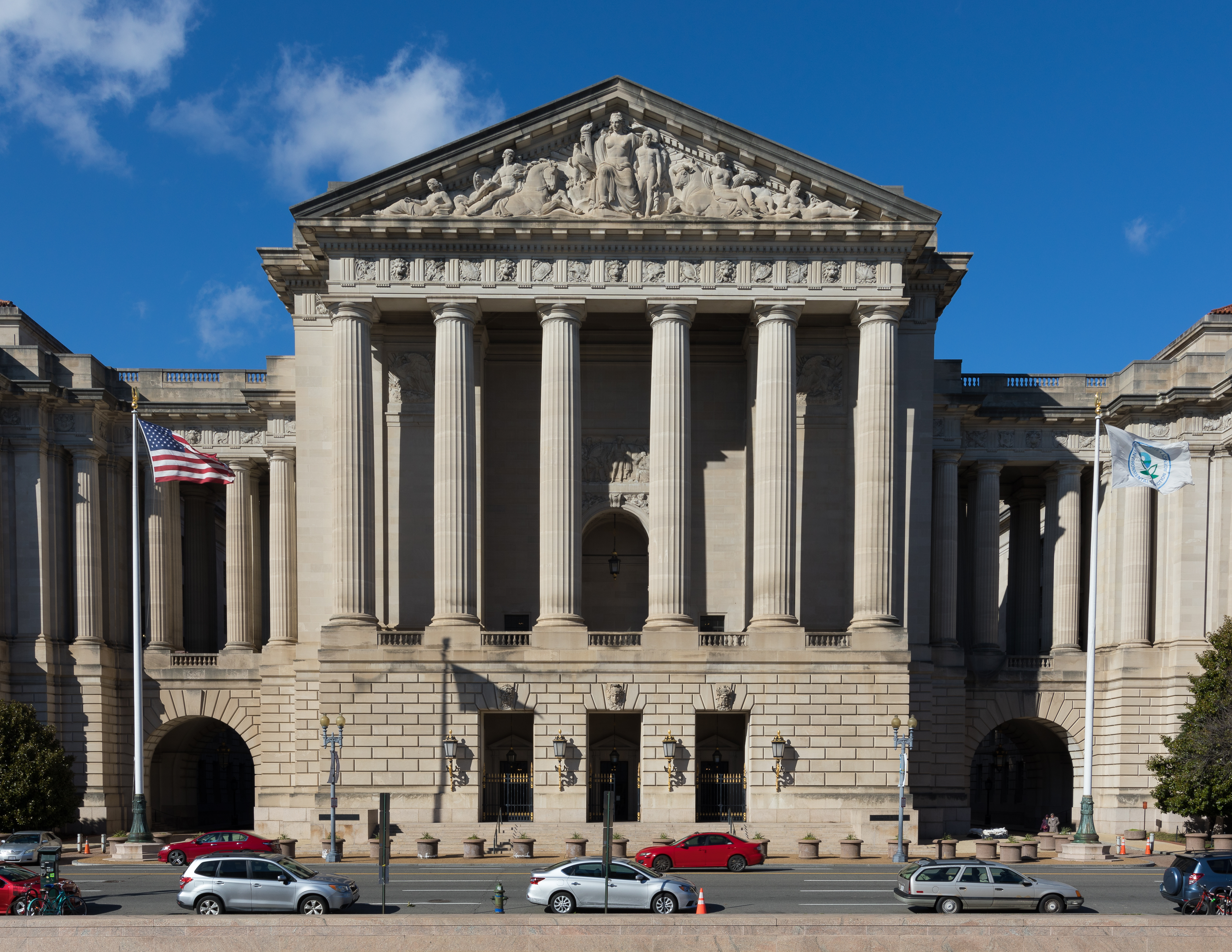
Much of the convention took place at the Andrew W. Mellon Auditorium in Washington, D.C.

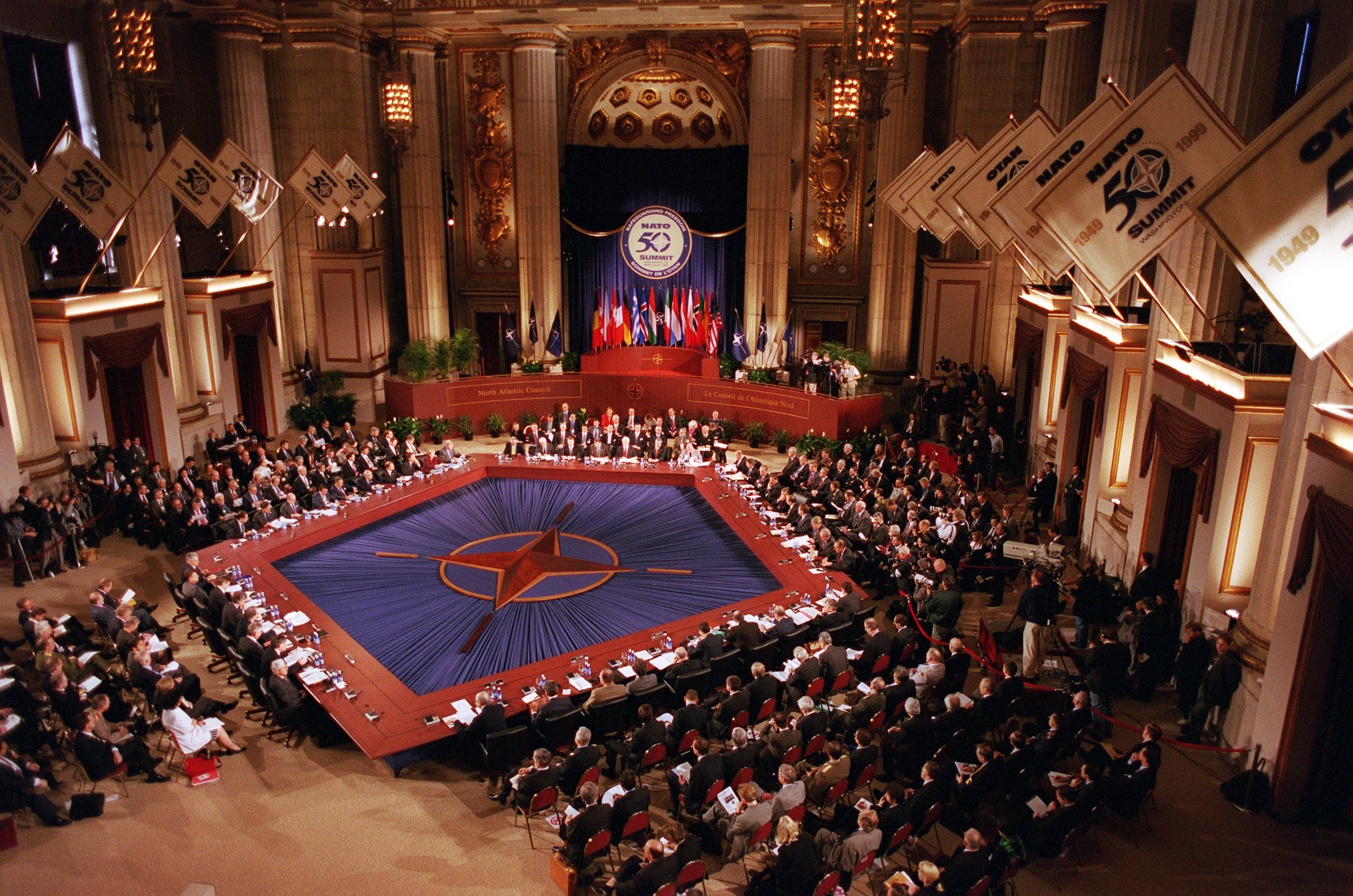
Interior of the Andrew W. Mellon Auditorium, during the 1999 NATO Summit

On August 14, it was announced that much of the convention would take place at the Andrew W. Mellon Auditorium in Washington, D.C. (part of the William Jefferson Clinton Federal Building), which would serve as the convention's "central hub". Some convention proceedings, albeit dramatically reduced in scale, were still held in Charlotte, such as "small, formal business meetings." Most speeches were delivered at Washington, D.C.'s Andrew W. Mellon Auditorium. Other events and festivities, including Trump's acceptance speech, were held remotely at various locations, including Fort McHenry and the White House.

With some events in Charlotte and most in Washington, D.C., the convention It was also the first major party nominating convention since the 1860 Democratic National Conventions to be centered in two different cities. It was the first-ever Republican National Convention to do so.

Trump's insistence on a full-scale convention up until being forced to scuttle the Jacksonville plans had left Republicans without an actionable plan for their convention, and with only four weeks to arrange one. The short timeframe constrained organizers. By contrast, the Democrats much earlier acceptance of a downscaled convention had allowed the Democratic Convention organizers months to plan for such a broadcast.

The new plans were arranged by a group that included lead convention planner Tony Sayegh, deputy campaign manager Justin R. Clark, head of presidential operations Max Miller, and Trump's daughter-in-law Lara Trump. The group started without a set budget, a venue, or a lineup of speakers. Planning meetings took place at locations including the Trump campaign headquarters (in Arlington, Virginia) and the Trump International Hotel Washington, D.C. Trump involved himself in many of the details, even minor, relating to the convention. The organizing team brought in additional trusted advisors of Trump to assist the effort, including Hope Hicks and Kellyanne Conway. Trump's wife, Melania Trump, also involved herself in planning the convention.

Sadoux Kim, a former producer of Trump's past reality show The Celebrity Apprentice, was selected to produce the convention. Trump and his advisors consulted with Kim, and decided that the convention would place a heavy focus on featuring non-politicians, and would mix both prerecorded and live-broadcast speeches. They planned for slick production, aiming to make the convention feel like a dramatic television program. They also decided to have their convention start a half-hour earlier than Democrats, providing 2½ hours of programming each night. Trump had significant input and final approve of the speaker lineup, time allotted to each speaker, which speeches would be pre-recorded or delivered live, and the locations at which speeches would be delivered.

== Committee on Arrangements and related leadership ==
The Committee on Arrangements for the convention was formed in July 2018. It had fifteen departments with a staff of roughly 120. The members of its executive committee, announced on July 26, 2018, were Chairman Toni Anne Dashiell, Co-chair Glenn McCall, Vice Chairs Jane Timken and Luis Fortuño, Treasurer Ron Kaufman, and Secretary Vicki Drummond. Former White House director of management and administration Marcia Lee Kelly was named convention president and chief executive officer in April 2019. Stephen "Max" Everett served as the convention's vice president and chief information officer. Other leadership team members included Chief of Program Whitney Anderson, deputy director of Operations and Buildout Luke Bullock, Chief of Staff and Director of Ticketing Christina "CC" Cobaugh, deputy director of Operations Kelly Eaton, Director of Communications Blair Ellis, National Press Secretary Tatum Gibson, Director of Signature Events Coordination Kelsey Gorman, deputy director of External Affairs Susan Haney, Director of Transportation Dustin Hendrix, Digital Director Doug Hochberg, deputy director of Finance Jinger Kelley, deputy director of Logistics Flow & Signage Andy King, deputy director of Transportation Thomas Krol, Director of Logistics Flow & Signange Edith "Dee Dee" Lancaster, counsel Joy Lee, Chief of Infrastructure Christine "Chris" Lesko, Director of Delegate Experience Diandra Lopez, Chief Financial Officer Thomas Maxwell, Chief Public Affairs Officer Dan McCarthy, Director of Administration Mallory McGough, Director of Security Robert "Bob" O’Donnell, Chief Logistics Officer Jonathan "Jonny" Oringdulph, Director of Special Projects Yandrick Paraison, Director of Community Affairs Russell Peck, deputy director of Security Max Poux, Director of Executive Operations Christopher Reese, Director of Operations James Sample, Director of Media Operations Lisa Shoemaker, and deputy director of Administration Megan Schenewerk.

Former White House director of management and administration Marcia Lee Kelly was named convention president and CEO in April 2019.

== Charlotte business session ==
Merely 336 Republican delegates attended a daytime business session held at the Charlotte Convention Center on August 24. This session included the roll call re-nominating Trump. The convention included some of the decor typical of a convention, including signs indicating where state delegations sat and complimentary "swag bags" for delegates. As a pandemic-related health precaution, seats were placed with distance between them to encourage social distancing. Additionally, convention organizers had instructed those attending to wear protective masks. However, a sizable share of those present disregard the instructions that they wear masks.

At one point, convention organizers planned on not granting press access to the convention meeting in Charlotte. On August 1, a Republican convention spokesperson said that, "Given the health restrictions and limitations in place within the state of North Carolina, we are planning for the Charlotte activities to be closed press" for the entirety of the convention. The decision to bar press was criticized by the White House Correspondents' Association. However, a Republican National Committee official cited by the Associated Press indicated that "no final decisions have been made and that logistics and press coverage options were still being evaluated." However, on August 12, the chairman of the credentials committee, Doyle Webb, said that a tiny group of reporters would indeed be permitted to cover the one-day official convention business, including the nominations of Trump and Pence.

== Logistics of Trump's acceptance speech ==
Stage being erected at the White House for Trump's acceptance speech

On July 28, Trump said that he would accept the nomination in person in Charlotte. However, on August 5, he said he would "likely" accept the Republican nomination from the White House. A decision to accept a party's nomination from the White House would break a norm; the Associated Press noted that it would "mark an unprecedented use of federal property for partisan political purposes." The proposed plans also raised legal questions under the Hatch Act, which creates certain prohibitions on the use of public resources for political activity, and the legality of the plan was questioned by Republican senators Ron Johnson and John Thune. While the president is exempt from the Hatch Act's restrictions, the law applies to other federal employees. The ethics director of the Campaign Legal Center stated that "any federal employee who helps facilitate the acceptance speech risks violating the Hatch Act." Nonetheless, Trump tweeted that he had decided to hold it on the White House lawn anyway, announcing on August 13 that he had finalized this decision. It was ultimately decided that Trump's speech would be delivered from the South Lawn.

Since Trump accepted his nomination remotely, it was the first time a Republican nominee has done so since Alf Landon in 1936. Since Democratic nominee Joe Biden also accepted the Democratic nomination remotely (the first time a Democrat has done so since Franklin D. Roosevelt in 1944); 2020 was the first election since 1928 in which neither major-party nominee accepted their nominations in-person.

=== Fireworks display ===
Due to the pandemic disruption, the 2020 convention did not include the traditional closing balloon drop. Instead, a fireworks display was substituted.

On August 14, the Republican National Committee filed an application with the National Park Service (NPS) requesting to utilize the National Mall, including the Washington Monument, for a fireworks display on the convention's closing night. Their application was approved. Their application stated that a 50-person crew would set up the display, adhering to D.C.'s temporary prohibition on gatherings larger than 50 people. The RNC pledged to reimburse the NPS for all expenses they'd face related to the display. The Republican National Committee reimbursed the federal government for damages to federal property that the show created, which amounted to more than $42,000 of damages. The Republican National Committee also reimbursed the federal government $177,000 to pay for approximately 4,000 hours labor by National Park Service employees to facilitate the display.

The display was reported by USA Today to have used more than 7,800 fireworks. The display lasted roughly six minutes. The display included fireworks which spelled-out the words "Trump 2020". The New York Times described the fireworks display as having been "extensive". The display was created by Fireworks by Grucci, and cost the Trump campaign $477,000. Fireworks by Grucci had previously created the fireworks display for Trumps' "Salute to America" Independence Day celebrations in 2019 and 2020. The fireworks display was regarded to have been impressive.

The use of property owned by the NPS for the convention's closing fireworks display was argued by some experts to raise ethics concerns that may be in violation of the Hatch Act. Sophia Anken of Business Insider observed that Trump's use of the National Mall for the display, "followed a trend across the convention of Trump putting the symbols and power of his office front and center, a departure from historical norms which has prompted widespread criticism."

== Security ==
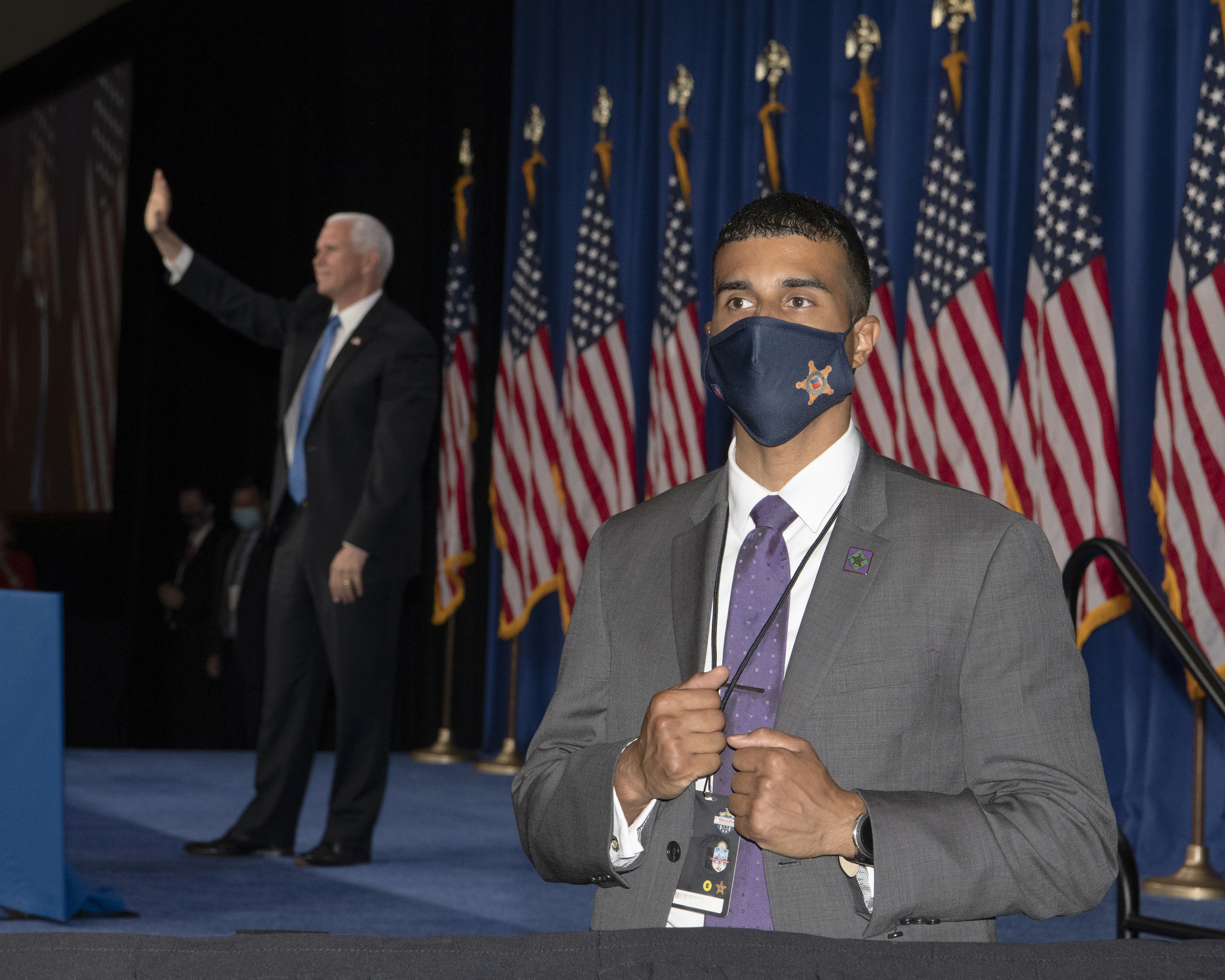
A United States Secret Service agent stands guard while Vice President Mike Pence speaks at the Charlotte Convention Center during the morning session of the convention's opening day

The Committee on Arrangements' director of security was Robert "Bob" O'Donnell, and its deputy director of security was Max Poux.

For the opening day, in which daytime events were held in Charlotte, several roads were closed near and surrounding the Charlotte Convention Center. Local transit services, including the Lynx Light Rail, were modified. A temporary ban on flying unmanned aerial vehicles was put in place in the Charlotte area. The Charlotte-Mecklenburg Police Department spent $17 million in expenditures related to the convention.

The Republican National Convention was designated as a National Special Security Event. The originally-planned Charlotte convention had been awarded this status. The plans for a convention in Jacksonville had also been awarded this status. Jacksonville had been given $30 million federal grants for security.

== Format and schedule ==
The nomination event took place in Charlotte, North Carolina, as the party was contractually obligated to conduct its official business there. Only just over 300 delegates were expected to attend.

The main speeches took place every night from 8:30 to 11:00 p.m. EDT. Headlining speakers spoke after 10:00 p.m. The speeches took place in Washington, D.C., rather than in Charlotte.

== Broadcasts and media coverage ==
It was announced August 2, 2020, that reporters would not be permitted on-site during the delegate business in Charlotte, but that the convention would, however, be live-streamed. This would mark the first time in modern history that the media will not be granted access to the nominating event of a major party candidate. However, the Republican National Committee walked this back, saying that the decision to bar reporters from entry had not been made final. On August 5, President Trump stated that the convention, in fact, would be open to the press.

=== Evening television viewership ===
==== Night 1 ====
Night one of the Republican convention had 17.0 million viewers across all cable and television networks tracked by Nielsen. The first night of the Democratic convention had 19.7 million viewers across the same networks. As per the table below, across six major, traditional television (NBC, CBS, ABC) and cable networks (FNC, CNN, MSNBC) tracked by Nielsen, night one of the Republican convention had 15.9 million viewers, compared to 18.8 million viewers for night one of the Democratic convention. According to C-SPAN, night one of the Republican convention had 440,000 viewers on C-SPAN, compared to 76,000 viewers for night one of the Democratic convention.

Compared to 2016, the only cable or television network that saw a rise in viewership for Night 1 was Fox News Channel.

Television network viewers by network (Night 1)
Network	Viewers
FNC	7,063,000
CNN	2,023,000
ABC	1,978,000
NBC	1,740,000
MSNBC	1,570,000
CBS	1,479,000

Television network viewers, age 25–54, by network (Night 1)
Network	Viewers
FNC	1,572,000
CNN	610,000
NBC	541,000
ABC	521,000
CBS	424,000
MSNBC	308,000

==== Night 2 ====
Night two of the Republican convention had 19.4 million viewers across all television networks tracked by Nielsen. The second night of the Democratic convention had 19.2 million viewers across the same networks. As per the table below, night two of the Republican convention had 18 million viewers across six major, traditional television and cable networks tracked by Nielsen. The second night of the Democratic convention had 18.5 million viewers across the same six networks.

These numbers do not include viewers on streaming services.

Compared to 2016, the only networks that saw a rise in viewership for Night 2 were Fox News Channel and MSNBC.

Television network viewers by network (Night 2)
Network	Viewers
FNC	7,899,000
NBC	2,495,000
CNN	2,134,000
ABC	2,097,000
MSNBC	1,827,000
CBS	1,515,000

Television network viewers, age 25–54, by network (Night 2)
Network	Viewers
FNC	1,634,000
NBC	684,000
CNN	618,000
ABC	561,000
MSNBC	386,000
CBS	362,000

==== Night 3 ====
Night three of the Republican convention had 17.3 million viewers across all television networks tracked by Nielsen. The third night of the Democratic convention had 22.8 million viewers across the same networks.

Compared to Night 2, the only network that saw a rise in viewership for Night 3 was CBS.

Compared to 2016, every network had a decline in viewership for Night 3. (Note: Many along the south coast of the United States were preparing for Hurricane Laura, and this likely contributed towards the drop in viewership.)

Television network viewers by network (Night 3)
Network	Viewers
FNC	6,973,000
NBC	1,966,000
ABC	1,895,000
CBS	1,781,000
CNN	1,525,000
MSNBC	1,468,000

Television network viewers, age 25–54, by network (Night 3)
Network	Viewers
FNC	1,376,000
NBC	595,000
ABC	534,000
CBS	497,000
CNN	490,000
MSNBC	311,000

==== Night 4 ====
Night four of the Republican convention had 23.8 million viewers across all television networks tracked by Nielsen. The fourth night of the Democratic convention had 24.6 million viewers across the same networks. Compared to Night 3, all six networks saw a rise in viewership for Night 4. Compared to 2016, every network had a decline in viewership for Night 4.

Television network viewers by network (Night 4)
Network	Viewers
FNC	9,043,000
ABC	2,575,000
NBC	2,271,000
CNN	2,196,000
MSNBC	1,829,000
CBS	1,784,000

Television network viewers, age 25–54, by network (Night 4)
Network	Viewers
FNC	2,129,000
CNN	759,000
ABC	725,000
NBC	720,000
CBS	461,000
MSNBC	388,000

== Controversies ==
=== COVID-19 risks ===
==== Crowds during convention ====
At events with in-person audiences, such as First Lady Melania Trump, Vice President Mike Pence, Ivanka Trump, and President Donald Trump's speeches, the Centers for Disease Control and Prevention-recommended practices of protective masks and social distancing were largely absent. Many audience members had not been tested for COVID-19.

During the convention, the first and second families were seen without masks mingling without social distancing in crowds of people also without masks. The crowd of 1,500 at the White House on the final night also greatly flouted Washington, D.C. regulations prohibiting gatherings of more than 50 people.

Despite having been required to wear protective masks and social distance, many delegates at the morning session of the opening day, held in Charlotte, did not wear protective masks and failed to socially distance, attracting controversy. Local health officials voiced concern. Four days later, August 28, it was reported that four people associated with the Charlotte event—two attendees of the morning session and two support staff—had subsequently tested positive for COVID-19.

This stood in strong contrast with the Democratic National Convention held the prior week, where the only in-person audience was a parking lot of spectators socially distanced (viewing from their cars) for the fireworks finale of the final night, and where masks were worn at times by both the presidential and vice-presidential nominees and their spouses.

==== Earlier convention plans ====
Safety concerns were raised over earlier plans to hold a large-scale in-person convention amid a pandemic. Despite these concerns, Trump, for an extended period of time, had resisted calls to scale-back the convention.

When the event was slated to be held in Jacksonville, residents and business owners near the VyStar Arena filed a lawsuit asking a judge to declare the event a "public nuisance" due to the health risk it posed "under the circumstances and practices encouraged and required by the Republican National Committee", and asked the judge to thereby either block the event from using the arena, or to limit the attendance to only 2,500 people.

=== Lynne Patton's Hatch Act violation ===
In April 2021, Lynn Patton, who was administrator of the United States Department of Housing and Urban Development for Region II at the time of the Republican National Convention, was fined $1,000 and barred for four years from federal employment as part of a settlement with the U.S. Office of Special Counsel, after admitting to violating the Hatch Act of 1939 by using her official federal government position to produce a video segment featuring residents of the New York City Housing Authority. She had utilized her role to develop relationships which she used to recruit participants for interviews she conducted in order to produce the video segment.

Shortly after the convention, Democratic New York City councilman (and congressional candidate) Ritchie Torres demanded that there be a federal probe into Patton's actions. In October 2020, a report released by the office of Democratic United States Senator Elizabeth Warren, compiled by her staff, on potential Hatch Act violations by the Trump administration had cited this as one of Patton's potential Hatch Act violations.

=== Other potential Hatch Act violations ===
Many aspects of the convention have been cited as potential violations of the Hatch Act.

On September 3, 2020, Democrats on the House Committee on Oversight and Reform wrote a letter to the Office of Special Counsel urging them to launch an investigation of, "multiple, repeated violations" of the Hatch Act committed during the convention.

== See also ==
- Logistics of the 2020 Democratic National Convention
