= Logistics of the 2020 Democratic National Convention =

- 2020 Democratic National Convention

Convention
- Date(s): August 17–20, 2020 (Note: Originally scheduled to be held July 13–16, but rescheduled due to the coronavirus pandemic.)
- City: Milwaukee, Wisconsin and various locations remotely (hybrid event due to COVID-19 pandemic)
- Convention hall: Wisconsin Center and various remote locations (originally planned for Fiserv Forum before pandemic)
- Convention hall capacity: Wisconsin Center capacity restricted at 250 (due to pandemic-related local restrictions on gatherings)
- Convention hall type: convention center
- Other significant venues: Chase Center on the Riverfront (in Wilmington, Delaware)
- Headquarters hotel: none (originally planned to be Hilton Milwaukee before pandemic)
- Held before or after DNC?: before
- NSSE designation?: yes

The logistics of the 2020 Democratic National Convention were unique from other United States presidential nominating conventions. Originally, the convention was scheduled to be staged in a manner similarly to other presidential conventions, being scheduled to take place July 13–16, 2020 at the Fiserv Forum in Milwaukee, Wisconsin. However, the impacts of the COVID-19 pandemic resulted in the convention drastically shifting to a virtual event with a production headquarters at the Wisconsin Center in Milwaukee. Initially, convention organizers responded to the pandemic by postponing the event to August 17–20, 2020, maintaining hopes of staging an in-person event. However, continuing pandemic restraints led to the ultimate abandonment of plans for an in-person convention.

The staging of a televised virtual convention, and the challenges imposed by pandemic health concerns led to complex logistics unique from any previous presidential convention. Adapting to pandemic restraints, the format of the convention was substantially different from previous conventions, with the duration of each day of the convention being significantly shorter than in past conventions and with most of the convention activity occurring held remotely from many venues across the country rather than at a single venue. Its activities were largely decentralized and it was regarded to be a "virtual" convention. However, the convention was officially considered to centered at the Wisconsin Center, which is where its production was headquartered, its roll call was directed from, and where a limited number of speeches (primarily those by Wisconsin politicians) were delivered.

While the 2020 Republican National Convention, held a week later, was similarly impacted by the COVID-19 pandemic, organizers of that convention took many differing approaches in how they staged their convention.

== Site selection ==
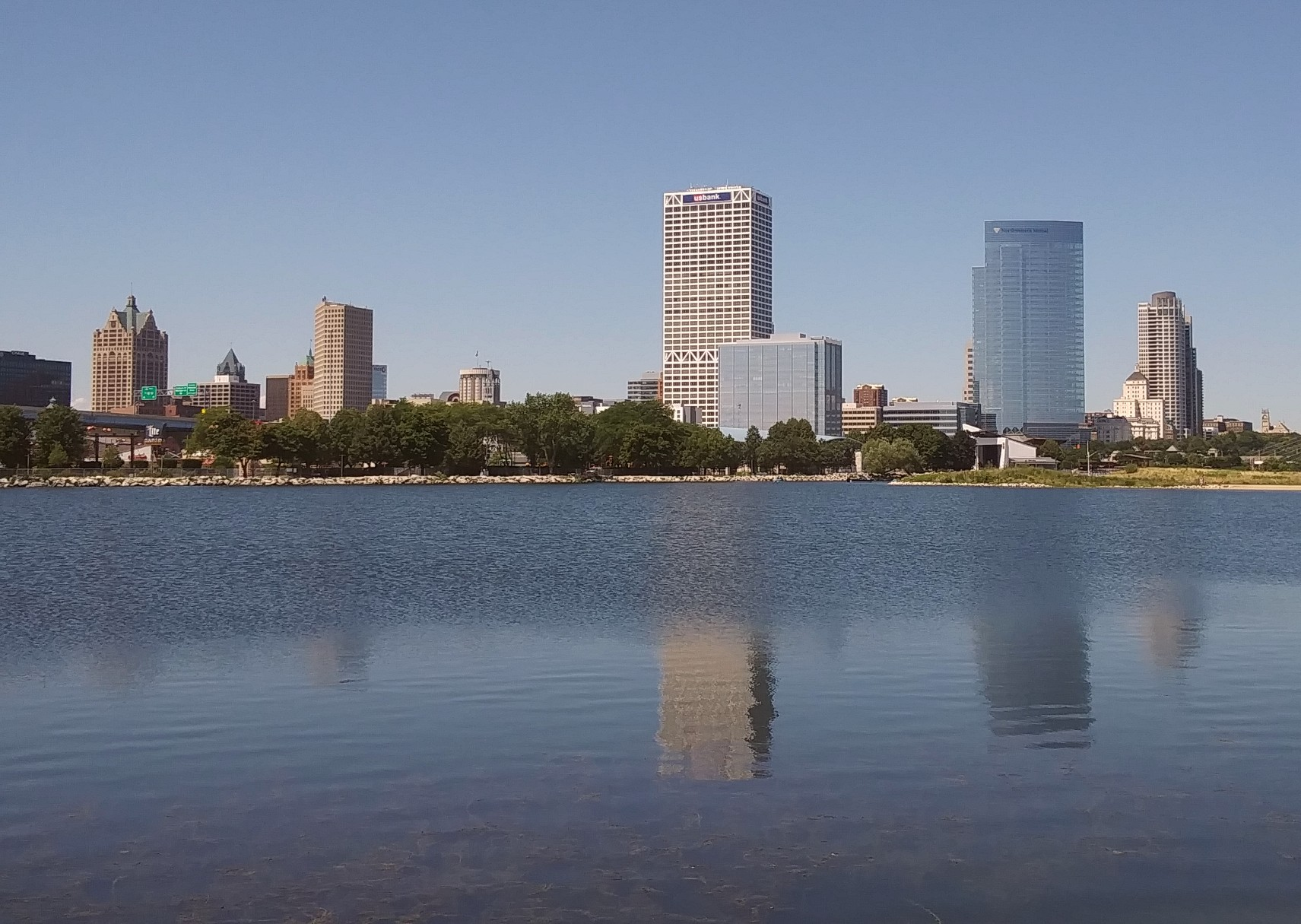
The host city of the convention was Milwaukee, Wisconsin.

The Fiserv Forum was the venue originally selected for the convention.

Wisconsin Center was ultimately the main location of the convention amid venue downsizing due to the COVID-19 pandemic.

Bids on the site for the convention were solicited by the Democratic National Committee (DNC) in late 2017. Preliminary requirements for host cities that the DNC laid out included that they should have between 17,000 and 18,000 hotel rooms (including 1,000 luxury suites) located within 30 minutes of the convention venue.

In the spring of 2018, the Democratic National Committee made public which cities were bidding. The field subsequently narrowed, with Las Vegas withdrawing after deciding it would focus solely on bidding for the 2020 Republican National Convention (an effort Las Vegas later abandoned without submitting a formal bid, with Republicans ultimately selecting the sole bid it received from Charlotte). In April 2018, the Democratic National Committee sent requests for proposals to the eight remaining cities that had expressed interest in hosting the event (Atlanta, Birmingham, Denver, Houston, Miami, Milwaukee, New York City, and San Francisco).

On June 20, 2018, the Democratic National Committee announced four finalists for the convention site (Denver, Houston, Miami, and Milwaukee). Immediately following the announcement, the finalist city of Denver withdrew from consideration due to apparent scheduling conflicts.

Chairman of the Democratic National Committee Tom Perez announced on March 11, 2019, that Milwaukee would host the convention.

The selection of Milwaukee made this the first Democratic National Convention to be hosted in the Midwestern United States since Chicago hosted the 1996 Democratic National Convention, and the first to be hosted in a midwestern city other than Chicago since St. Louis hosted the 1916 Democratic National Convention. This was the first major party convention held in Milwaukee. It was also the first major party convention to be held in any city in the state of Wisconsin.

In terms of population, Milwaukee is smaller than other metropolitan areas that had hosted recent major party conventions. Milwaukee is among the smallest metropolitan areas to have hosted a major party convention. Milwaukee's success in bidding for the convention was viewed in some circles as an upset, as the other two remaining finalist cities were not only larger metropolitan areas, but also had significant experience hosting major events such as Super Bowls.

Milwaukee's selection was seen, in part, as emphasizing party's desire to place an focus on winning Midwestern states like Wisconsin, and its desire to win back "blue wall" states in the upper Midwest and Great Lakes region. The swing states of Michigan, Pennsylvania, and Wisconsin had been the states which the Republican ticket of Donald Trump and Mike Pence had won by the narrowest margins in the preceding 2016 election, and had these states been instead won by the 2016 Democratic ticket of Hillary Clinton and Tim Kaine, they would have delivered the Democratic ticket an Electoral College victory in 2016. The 2016 election had also been the first time since the 1980s that any of these three states had voted Republican. The three aforementioned "blue wall" states were, ultimately, won by the Biden-Harris ticket in 2020.

Some sources cited DNC chairman Tom Perez's personal connections to Milwaukee as a factor that aided Milwaukee's selection. His wife had originally been from nearby Wauwatosa, they had held their wedding in Milwaukee, and their daughter was a current student at University of Wisconsin–Milwaukee.

=== Bids ===
Several cities made efforts to be selected as the location of the 2020 convention.

Bidding cities
City	Status of bid	Venue	Previous major party conventions hosted by city
Milwaukee, Wisconsin	Winner	Fiserv Forum	—N/a
Houston, Texas	Finalist	Toyota Center (main venue); George R. Brown Convention Center (secondary venue)	Democratic:1928; Republican:1992
Miami, Florida	Finalist	American Airlines Arena (main venue); Miami Beach Convention Center (secondary venue)	Democratic:1972; Republican:1968, 1972
Denver, Colorado	Finalist withdrew after finalist selection	Pepsi Center	Democratic:1908, 2008
Atlanta, Georgia	Submitted a letter of interest		Democratic:1988
Birmingham, Alabama	Submitted a letter of interest		—N/a
Las Vegas, Nevada	Submitted a letter of interest, withdrew in order to focus on bid for 2020 RNC		—N/a
New York City, New York	Submitted a letter of interest		Democratic: 1868, 1924, 1976, 1980, 1992; Republican: 2004
San Francisco, California	Submitted a letter of interest		Democratic: 1920, 1984; Republican:1956, 1964

== Host committee ==
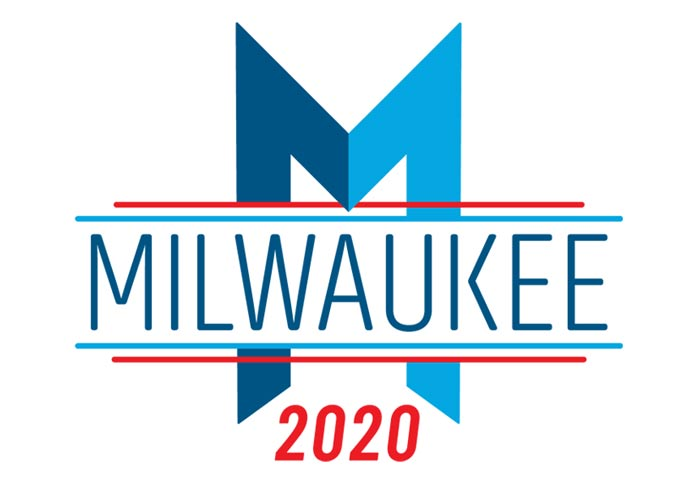
Host committee logo

The Milwaukee 2020 Host Committee was established to organize the convention.

In October 2019, the Host Committee announced its leadership team. The president of the Host Committee was Liz Gilbert. Leadership included a board of directors. Further leadership included co-chairs and vice chairs, as well as honorary vice-chairs. The co-chairs of the Host Committee were Milwaukee mayor Tom Barrett and Congresswoman Gwen Moore. Vice chairs included Milwaukee County executive Chris Abele, U.S. senator Tammy Baldwin, Lieutenant Governor of Wisconsin Mandela Barnes, Governor of Wisconsin Tony Evers, former U.S. senator Herb Kohl. Honorary vice chairs included Milwaukee Common Council president Ashanti Hamilton and Wisconsin state treasurer Sarah Godlewski, Democratic leader for the Wisconsin State Assembly Gordon Hintz, Attorney General of Wisconsin Josh Kaul, Congressman Ron Kind, Wisconsin secretary of state Doug La Follette, Congressman Mark Pocan, and Wisconsin State Senate minority leader Jennifer Shilling. Additionally, the Host Committee's honorary finance chair was Alex Lasry, the senior vice president of the Milwaukee Bucks.

In early February 2020, Milwaukee 2020 Host Committee president Liz Gilbert and her chief-of-staff Adam Lonso were both fired after an investigation found that the committee's "work environment did not meet the ideals and expectations" of the organization's board (with allegations of a "toxic" work environment). Acting as interim leader of the Host Committee was Teresa Vilmain. In late February, a new leadership team was announced with Raquel Filmanowicz as CEO and Paula Penebaker as COO, taking these positions formally on March 2, 2020.

The host committee raised $40 million to stage the convention.

== Original plans ==
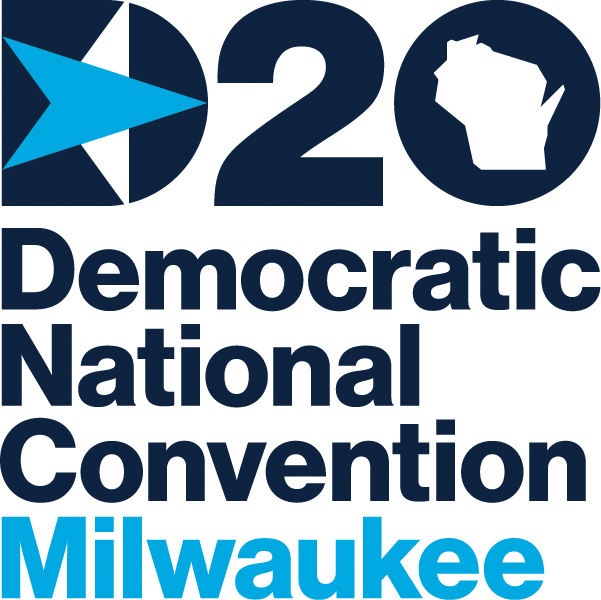
The originally-slated logo of the 49th Democratic National Convention, which included a geographical representation of the host state of Wisconsin

Before it was downsized, 50,000 people had been expected to attend the convention, and the conventions were expected to generate a $250 million local economic impact.

The Democratic Party (in June 2018) scheduled for its 2020 convention to be held July 13–16, considered quite early in comparison to major party conventions of the past few elections. It marked the earliest calendar dates that the Democrats had held a convention since their 1992 convention. A July convention would have occurred in advance of the scheduled dates for the 2020 Summer Olympics. As Olympics are a major event that attracts tremendous public attention, the major parties schedule their presidential so as not to overlap with the Olympics. A decades-long "gentlemen's agreement" between the two parties has held that the party of the incumbent president holds its convention at a later date than the other party, which held when Republicans later selected to hold their convention August 24–27. The Republican convention dates were shortly after the Olympics were scheduled to close. The Olympics, like the Democratic National Convention, would ultimately be delayed due to the COVID-19 pandemic.

Organizers were originally planning to recruit 15,000 volunteers.

The firm Populous was named as the event architect. Populous was assigned to work in partnership with Milwaukee firm American Design Inc. In February 2020, Milwaukee-based JCP construction was awarded the contract to be the construction general contractor for the convention. Hargrove LLC was, at the same time, awarded the contract to serve as the convention's event management firm.

Plans for the convention included renting 500 buses that would be used for delegate transportation. Milwaukee had also been planning an extension of The Hop (its modern streetcar line) that it hoped to complete in advance of the convention. However, these plans faltered, and no expansion was built before the convention.

=== Overnight accommodations ===
31 state delegations were to stay in 2,926 Milwaukee-area hotel rooms and 26 delegations were to stay in 2,841 hotel rooms in Lake County and Rosemont, Illinois. Another 11,000 hotel rooms were to house volunteers, members of the media, donors, and other attendees. Additionally, dormitories at Milwaukee-area universities and colleges were planned to accommodate some convention guests and volunteers. The Hilton Milwaukee City Center was to serve as the convention's "headquarters hotel".

=== Ancillary events ===
An estimated 2,500 ancillary events were anticipated to be staged at venues throughout Milwaukee.

Cable news broadcaster CNN had planned to convert Turner Hall (an events venue near the Fiserv Forum) into a pop-up CNN Grill, similar to those it had staged at previous presidential conventions. After the Democratic Party delayed its convention, CNN was able to secure the dates necessary to stage its CNN grill at Turner Hall during the new convention dates. However, CNN withdrew its plans for a CNN Grill after it became apparent the DNC was likely to downscale the convention to a virtual event.

A proposal was made for the state to pass legislation that would have extended the permitted hours of operation for bars in the Milwaukee area during the convention. However, this was not passed prior to the COVID-19 pandemic and the proposal was abandoned.

== Delay and downsizing ==
While convention was originally scheduled to be held July 13–16, 2020, this shifted amid the pandemic. On April 2, 2020, it was announced that, due to the COVID-19 pandemic, the convention would be delayed to August 17–20.

As early as April 2020, the Democratic Party had been bracing for the possibility of a virtual convention being necessitated by COVID-19 health concerns. On May 12, 2020, the Democratic National Committee authorized the convention planners to research alternative methods for participants to cast votes, considering the possibility that the Democratic National Committee may decide to hold the entire convention virtually.

On June 24, 2020, it was announced that the convention was to be downsized. The venue was shifted from the Fiserv Forum to the Wisconsin Center. But, instead of the entire convention being held in Milwaukee, it was now to feature Milwaukee as merely a hub city for the major convention events. The convention was now planned to instead consist of what the DNC said would be "curated content from Milwaukee and other satellite cities, locations, and landmarks across the country". All official business will now be conducted remotely. Organizers canceled official parties and events scheduled to be held in Milwaukee before and coinciding with the convention. Delegates were asked to no longer travel to Milwaukee, and plans were now formally made to implement a system for them to cast their votes virtually. The change of location made this the first major party convention held in a convention center since the 1996 Republican National Convention, and the first Democratic convention to be held in such a venue since the 1984 Democratic National Convention.

In mid-July, members of Congress were told not to travel to Milwaukee for the event. At the announcement of the downsizing, it was initially declared that Biden would still accept his nomination in Milwaukee. It was later announced on July 30, 2020, that his running mate would also accept her nomination in Milwaukee. However, on August 5, 2020, it was announced that Biden no longer planned to travel to Milwaukee to accept his nomination, and would instead do so from Delaware. It was also announced then that a number of other speakers that had been scheduled to travel to Milwaukee, including Biden's running mate, would also instead be addressing the convention remotely. This was seen as, effectively, moving to make the convention almost entirely virtual. This was the first time that a major party presidential candidate had accepted their nomination remotely from the official site of the convention since Franklin D. Roosevelt did so in 1944.

There were initially plans to have up to 5,000 attendees in Milwaukee for the convention at the inception of its downsizing. This was later further reduced to 1,000; and then again reduced 300 people, including both attendees and media granted access. Due to an order imposed by the Milwaukee Health Department barring gatherings over 250 people, the total number of people permitted to gather at the Milwaukee convention hub was ultimately capped at that number. There were no delegates in the Wisconsin Center. While speakers were not traveling to Milwaukee, plans were retained for Chairman of the Democratic National Committee Tom Perez and Secretary of the Democratic National Committee Jason Rae (also secretary of the convention) to be in Milwaukee.

The owner of the Milwaukee Bucks and the Fiserv Forum threatened to sue the Democratic Party, which had paid only $5.5 million of the $7 million rent on the venue.

Following the decision to relocate the venue to Wisconsin Center, Fiserv Forum was later chosen to be as the main venue for the 2024 Republican National Convention, was held on July 15–18, 2024.

== Health protocols ==
Due to the ongoing COVID-19 pandemic, a number of protocols have been put in place.

Participants at Wisconsin Center were required to self-quarantine for at least 72 hours before arriving, wear personal protective equipment, undergo daily COVID-19 testing, partake in symptom tracking through a daily questionnaire, avoid bars and restaurants, and follow Centers for Disease Control and Prevention guidelines.

== Security ==
As is routine for a major party convention, the event had been designated a National Special Security Event. Originally, the United States Department of Justice was to provide $50 million in security, but this was decreased to $40 million.

The boundaries of the planned security footprint, in which increased security measures would be implemented, but in which individuals not attending the convention (including demonstrators) were still to be permitted, was announced in January 2020. The streets marking the boundary of the announced footprint were to be Cherry Street on the north, 10th Street on the west, Clybourn Street, and Water Street on the east. On July 24, 2020, the Milwaukee Common Council passed an ordinance that would ban a long list of items from the security footprint, including air rifles, nunchucks, drones, containers of bodily fluids, glass bottles, and coolers. On August 12, 2020, it was announced that the security footprint had been shrunk significantly. The security footprint ultimately encompassed almost only areas directly surrounding the convention center. Fencing was erected surrounding the Wisconsin Center. Temporary flight restrictions were in place each night from 6:00 to 11:00 p.m. CDT. A ban on drones was also in place.

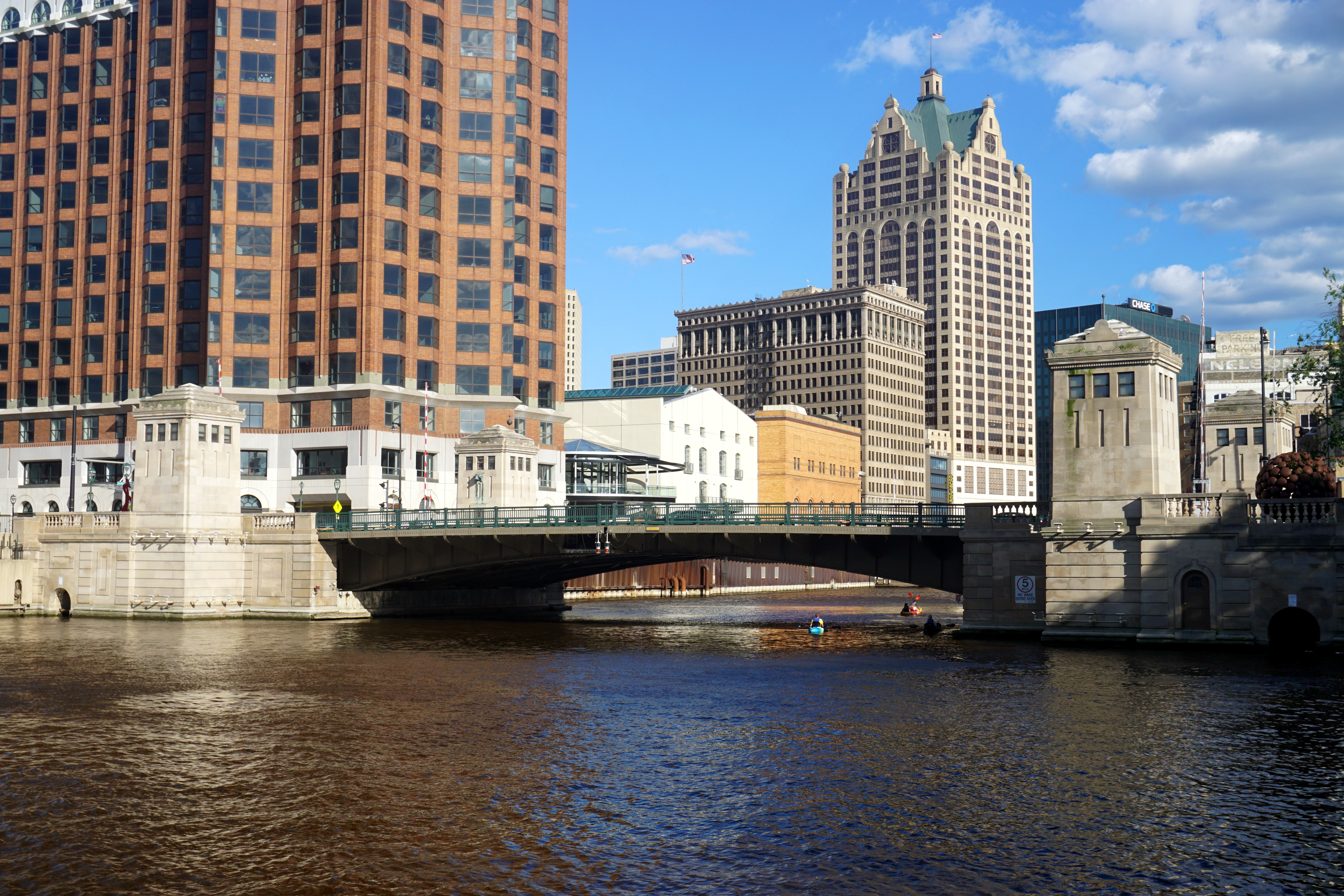
There was discussion of potentially limiting boat traffic on the Milwaukee River (pictured) by placing a temporary stay on all bridge opening.

Originally, the city originally budgeted to have approximately 3,000 law enforcement officers from outside the city assist the Milwaukee Police Department during the convention. This was decreased to approximately 2,000. By late July there were anticipated to be only 1,100 officers from outside the city assisting the department. However, in late July, more than 100 police agencies announced that they would be withdrawing from their contracts to provide personnel to aid in security during the convention after the Milwaukee police chief announced that their department would restrict the use of tear gas and pepper spray by law enforcement during demonstrations and protests. The Wisconsin National Guard then planned to provide hundreds of members to help with security. There had been talk of potentially limiting boat traffic on the Milwaukee River by placing a temporary stay on all bridge openings, but this security measure did not materialize.

== Programming ==
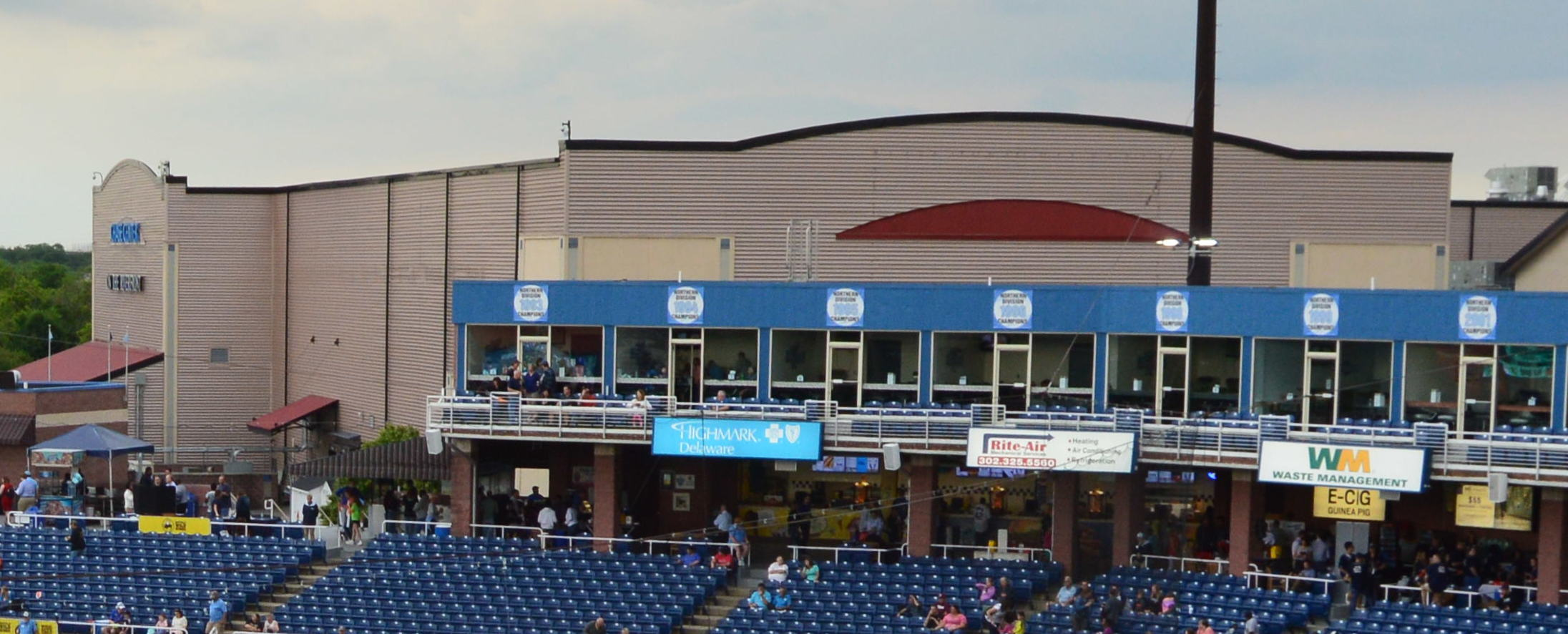
Chase Center on the Riverfront in Wilmington, Delaware, the location of Biden and Harris's acceptance speeches.

The official theme of the convention was "Uniting America". The Wisconsin Center was used for the convention's broadcast and production, acting as the control room and "hub" of the convention production. The convention's programming was a mix of pre-recorded segments and live broadcasts from sites across the United States. The convention organizers established a custom video control room in the exhibit hall on the third floor of the Wisconsin Center, designed to handle hundreds of feeds from across the country, in order to accommodate the remote speeches. Supplementary control rooms existed in other locations, such as in Delaware. Producer Glenn Weiss oversaw the production from a temporary control studio created for him at his personal residence. Also acting as producer was Ricky Kirshner.

Speakers appeared from various "satellite locations", including key studios in Los Angeles, New York City, and at the Chase Center on the Riverfront in Wilmington, Delaware. The broadcasts were emceed by their nightly hosts from the studio in Los Angeles. All of the speeches were held behind closed doors with no in-person audience.

A stage was set up in a conference room on the second floor of the Wisconsin Center. The stage at the Wisconsin Center saw limited use, with a number of participants from Wisconsin using it as the venue for their participation in the convention. Convention secretary Jason Rae also directed the roll call from the Wisconsin Center stage. The roll call featured votes being presented from locations in each state or territory, with some of the votes presented by special guests emphasizing Biden's history and platform; Bob Casey Jr. appeared from Biden's childhood home in Scranton, Pennsylvania, LGBT rights activists Judy and Dennis Shepard presented Wyoming's votes, and gun control advocate Fred Guttenberg (whose daughter was killed in the Stoneman Douglas High School shooting) presented Florida's votes.

The duration of the convention program was significantly downsized from one that was originally expected to total 24 hours over the four days to one that would total only eight hours. The downsizing led the convention organizers to need far fewer volunteers than the 15,000 they had originally been trying to recruit.

Music performances were filmed for inclusion in the main programming.

In addition to the televised convention programming, further content was livestreamed by the Democratic Party on digital platforms. Prior to the beginning of each night's programming, the hip-hop music channel Behind the Rhyme on Twitch streamed the official pre-show and post-show for each night, with the latter featuring performances by Beverly Bond, Vashtie, DJ Cassidy, Jermaine Dupri on each night respectively. The political podcast Pod Save America also aired a "Live from the Democratic National Couch-vention" special prior to the August 20 broadcast, which featured the premiere of its new documentary short Dress Rehearsal, which chronicled the April 2020 state Supreme Court election in Wisconsin. Following the closing night of the convention, the Democratic Party livestreamed an "after party" on digital platforms hosted by Andy Cohen and headlined by musician Diplo. The program featured segments featuring celebrities filmed from their homes. Celebrities participating in the "after party" broadcast included Alyssa Milano, Aubrey Plaza, Liza Koshy, Zooey Deschanel, Michelle Kwan, Nicole Ehrlich, Cat Cora, Jaime Camil, Elena Delle Donne, Jason Winston George, Keith Powell, and Neil Casey. Also featured in the "after party" program were political figures such as Democratic National Committee Chair Tom Perez, Senator Chris Coons, and Biden campaign advisor Symone Sanders.

=== Ceremonial roll call ===
Due to the pandemic, the party opted to conduct formal voting on the party's nomination both virtually and in advance of the convention itself. This rendered the roll call that was performed during the second evening of the convention purely ceremonial. As with other aspects of the convention, the ceremonial roll call was performed virtually rather than at a single location. It saw participation by all of the convention's 57 delegations (including all 50 states and seven additional territories/jurisdictions (the District of Columbia, the five inhabited U.S. territories, and Democrats Abroad). The production of the remote roll call was widely praised.

=== Closing fireworks display ===
Due to the pandemic disruption, the 2020 Democratic National Convention did not include the closing balloon drop that is traditional at most major party presidential conventions. Instead, a fireworks display was substituted. After Biden's acceptance speech, the convention closed with Biden and Harris proceeding to exit the Chase Center on the Riverfront to grace a stage outside of the venue. There, they waved to a drive-in audience that had watched a broadcast of the speech from approximately 360 cars. The crowd greeted the nominees with cheers and the honking of their car horns. A five-minute fireworks display was then orchestrated before this audience to conclude the convention.

== Digital voting for official balloting ==
In an email in early August, Democratic National Committee Secretary Jason Rae wrote to delegates outlining the process for 2020 convention, noting that the planning committee "concluded that state delegations should not plan to travel to Milwaukee and official convention business will be conducted remotely." Instead of a traditional in-person roll call, a process was created in which delegates voted remotely using a system that the planning committee crafted, which enabled delegates to cast their ballots via email with unique identifiers for security. The virtual roll call also included a process though which the Democratic National Committee would certify each delegate, which delegates were able to complete by filling out electronic forms. The use of electronic forms meant that delegates would not need to use printers or physical copies.

The ballot that delegates would fill out included questions about platform planks and the party's nominees. Delegates would send their completed ballot to their state party committees. After a state party had all the ballots from their delegation, the state delegation's chair would submit a tally sheet to the Democratic National Committee Secretary's Office "that formally records the number of votes cast on each item of convention business," The Democratic National Committee would tally all votes at once on August 15, as opposed to tallying them on the days they were received.

Voting began August 3 and ended August 15, when the state delegation chairs were asked to submit their final tallies to the DNC secretary. That meant that the party knew the tally of votes for its nominee before the convention formally began.

== Broadcasts and media coverage ==
For previous recent conventions, domestic 24-hour cable news channels broadcast wall-to-wall coverage of day-long proceedings. However, during the Democratic and Republican conventions of 2016, the length of prime time coverage provided by the "Big Three" domestic television networks was also one hour per night . The 2020 convention was slimmed down from previous iterations in terms of the length of television programming it provided, with only two hours of televised events taking place on each night of the convention.

In 2020, PBS, C-SPAN and domestic 24-hour cable news channels including CNN and MSNBC all broadcast both hours of each night of the Democratic Party convention. However, Fox News and the big three domestic television networks (ABC, CBS, and NBC) only broadcast the last hour of each night. A number of domestic cable news channels and internet news platforms and streaming video news channels also aired further coverage of the convention in addition to the two hours of the convention itself. PBS, for example, aired an additional hour of commentary. In addition to the main convention broadcast, other media coverage opportunities were had been made available to the press by the convention organizers and the Biden campaign, including remote press briefings and interviews.

Broadcasters pooled their resources and shrank their footprints at the convention. The convention organizers worked with both the network pool and the congressional press galleries to establish pooled media opportunities. There was more of a reliance by broadcasters on footage from press pool cameras than at past conventions. As the convention initially began to downsize, networks moved to agree to plans to utilize a single shared camera feed of the convention's stage. As with past conventions, the convention organizers made a feed of convention proceedings available for free to media organizations.

Due to the pandemic, and the resultant decentralization of the convention, there was only expected to be a small press pool in Milwaukee, with as few as a hundred media personnel being anticipated to travel to Milwaukee. This was drastically less than the more than 15,000 that traveled to Philadelphia for the 2016 Democratic National Convention. Unlike past conventions, most broadcasters did not send correspondents to the convention site, and instead filmed their reporters at remote sites. Limited press were admitted into the Wisconsin Center headquarters of the convention. Those reporters that did go to the convention were socially distanced, and, at least at times, reported from outside of the convention hall. Most broadcasters had their correspondents provide coverage from network studios in New York City and Washington, D.C. In addition to filming their correspondents off-site, most broadcasters also used their primary control rooms in their own headquarter cities, as opposed to the practice of establishing temporary control rooms in the convention city as many had for past conventions. Few national broadcasters sent crews to Milwaukee.

After the downsizing, but even before it was announced that Biden and other speakers would no longer travel to Milwaukee, many broadcasters had already substantially scaled back plans to send reporters to the city, or had planned to forgo sending reporters to the city altogether. By July 29, Fox News was the only broadcaster confirmed to be sending correspondents to the convention hall itself. As of early July, MSNBC had still planned a "light footprint" in the city Milwaukee, but planned to position the reporters they would send outdoors, where they could socially distance from each other, instead of inside the convention venue. CNN also, as of early August, still planned to send reporters to Milwaukee. As of early August, CBS News was planning to send two correspondents to Milwaukee. In addition, after the downsizing, but even before it was that Biden and other speakers would no longer be traveling to Milwaukee, broadcasters had already planned to significantly decrease the size of crews they would send to capture the convention in comparison to previous years. CNN had already canceled its original plans to operate a "CNN Grill" studio and meeting space, similar to those it had operated at every major party convention since 2004. They had originally planned to use Turner Hall for such a space. Fox News, on the other hand, before the announcement that Biden and other speakers would not be traveling to the convention, still planned to retain their plans to utilize the Deer Camp building in Milwaukee as a broadcast space, and CBS News still planned to rent the Milwaukee Community Sailing Center for broadcast use. NBCUniversal cancelled similar plans to use the Good City Brewing location adjacent to the Fiserv Forum.

Due to the fact that Biden and Harris spoke from Wilmington, Delaware, some media personnel covered the convention from there, with a number of broadcast vans and media tents being stationed in the parking lots of the Chase Center on the Riverfront (where Biden and Harris spoke) and adjacent Frawley Stadium.

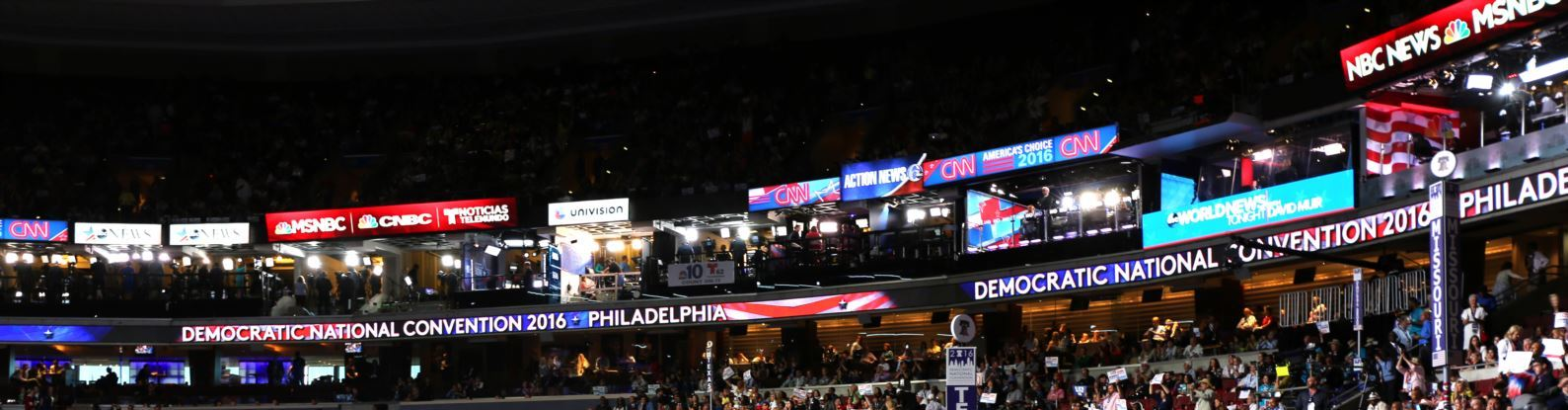
The originally-planned full-scale convention in Fiserv Forum would have seen broadcasters set up live sets inside the arena, similar to those in this image of the 2016 Democratic National Convention.

The originally-planned full-scale convention in the Fiserv Foum would have seen broadcasters set up live sets inside the arena, as has been practice at past conventions. Before the announcement that speakers would no longer be traveling to Milwaukee, convention organizers had been setting up some form of indoor and outdoor news media spaces at the Milwaukee convention hub.

=== Official streams and watch parties ===
In addition to coverage by broadcasters, there is a stream broadcast by the DNC itself on fifteen platforms. These platforms are the convention's website, YouTube, Facebook, Twitter, Twitch, Amazon Prime Video, Microsoft Bing, Apple TV, Roku TV, Amazon Fire TV, AT&T U-verse, DirecTV, Comcast Xfinity X1, Comcast Xfinity Flex, and Amazon Alexa.

In addition, the Biden campaign scheduled numerous virtual watch parties during the convention which showed a stream of the convention, with a number of them being hosted by prominent politicians and celebrities. Some outdoor socially-distanced watch parties were hosted by Democratic Party organizations, such as one for Connecticut convention delegates to attend at Dunkin' Donuts Park in Hartford. There were additionally drive-in watch parties held by Democratic Party organizers, including one right outside the Chase Center on the Riverfront on the night Biden accepted his nomination there.

=== Evening television viewership ===
According to Nielsen, the Democratic National Convention averaged 21.6 million views across all traditional cable and television networks across all four nights. This is composed of 19.7 million viewers on night 1, 19.2 million viewers on night 2, 22.8 million viewers on night 3, 24.6 million viewers on night 4.

These numbers do not include viewers on livestream.

==== Night 1 ====
Night one of the Democratic convention had 19.7 million viewers across all cable and television networks tracked by Nielsen. The first night of the Republican convention had 17.0 million viewers across the same networks.

Night one of the Democratic convention had 18.8 million viewers across six major, traditional television (NBC, CBS, ABC) and cable networks (FNC, CNN, MSNBC) tracked by Nielsen. The first night of the Republican convention had 15.9 million viewers across the same six networks.

For six minutes of its broadcast, MBSNC's signal was lost on DirecTV's television service, with those watching the channel on DirectTV being given a "technical difficulties" screen for the channel.

The viewership for the first night of the convention was down by 25% compared to the equivalent night in 2016.

Compared to 2016, the only network that saw a rise in viewership for Night 1 was MSNBC.

Television network viewers by network (Night 1)
Network	Viewers
MSNBC	5,169,000
CNN	4,848,000
ABC	2,442,000
NBC	2,282,000
Fox News	2,100,000
CBS	1,987,000

Television network viewers, age 25–54, by network (Night 1)
Network	Viewers
CNN	1,521,000
MSNBC	1,020,000
NBC	676,000
ABC	650,000
Fox News	437,000
CBS	425,000

==== Night 2 ====
Night two of the Democratic convention had 19.2 million viewers across all television networks tracked by Nielsen. The second night of the Republican convention had 19.4 million viewers across the same networks.

Night two of the Democratic convention had 18.5 million viewers across six major, traditional television and cable networks tracked by Nielsen. The second night of the Republican convention had 18 million viewers across the same six networks. These numbers do not include viewers on streaming services.

Compared to 2016, the only network that saw a rise in viewership for Night 2 was MSNBC.

Television network viewers by network (Night 2)
Network	Viewers
MSNBC	5,368,000
CNN	4,304,000
NBC	2,323,000
ABC	2,246,000
Fox News	2,145,000
CBS	2,072,000

Television network viewers, age 25–54, by network (Night 2)
Network	Viewers
CNN	1,295,000
MSNBC	1,051,000
NBC	592,000
ABC	584,000
CBS	482,000
Fox News	429,000

==== Night 3 ====
Night three of the Democratic convention had 22.8 million viewers across all television networks tracked by Nielsen. The third night of the Republican convention had 17.3 million viewers across the same networks.

Night three of the Democratic convention had 21.5 million viewers across six major, traditional television and cable networks tracked by Nielsen.

Compared to 2016, the only network that saw a rise in viewership for Night 3 was MSNBC.

Television network viewers by network (Night 3)
Network	Viewers
MSNBC	6,478,000
CNN	5,828,000
NBC	2,526,000
ABC	2,484,000
Fox News	2,160,000
CBS	1,993,000

Television network viewers, age 25–54, by network (Night 3)
Network	Viewers
CNN	1,712,000
MSNBC	1,305,000
NBC	805,000
ABC	638,000
CBS	533,000
Fox News	487,000

==== Night 4 ====
Night four of the Democratic convention had 24.6 million viewers across all television networks tracked by Nielsen.

Compared to 2016, the only network that saw a rise in viewership for Night 4 was MSNBC.

Compared to Night 3 of 2020, the only networks that saw a rise in viewership for Night 4 were Fox News Channel and ABC.

All television viewers, by network (Night 4)
Network	Viewers
MSNBC	6,146,000
CNN	5,565,000
ABC	2,972,000
Fox News	2,955,000
NBC	2,154,000
CBS	1,985,000

Television viewers age 25–54, by network (Night 4)
Network	Viewers
CNN	1,690,000
MSNBC	1,247,000
ABC	799,000
Fox News	639,000
NBC	568,000
CBS	473,000

== See also ==
- Logistics of the 2020 Republican National Convention
  - Cancelled plans for 2020 Republican National Convention in Jacksonville
- Logistics of the 2024 Republican National Convention —full-scale nominating convention held in Milwaukee four years later
