= Cancelled plans for 2020 Republican National Convention in Jacksonville =

host committee logo

Resisting the prospect of downscaling the 2020 Republican National Convention in compliance with state health measures in North Carolina, U.S. President Donald Trump announced in May 2020 that most aspects of the convention would be moved from Charlotte to the Florida city of Jacksonville. In Florida (which had a Republican governing trifecta), it was hoped that the Republican Party could stage a full-scale in-person convention to Trump's liking. In the weeks that followed, a Jacksonville host committee developed plans for the convention, and raised a portion of the funds needed to stage the convention. However, rising COVID-19 infection rates in Florida resulted in the ultimate cancellation of plans to stage the convention in Jacksonville, and a decision was instead forced to significantly downscale the convention. Instead of Jacksonville, the 2020 convention was ultimately centered in Washington, D.C., where it was staged in a significantly downsized format.

== Background ==
The 2020 Republican National Convention was initially scheduled to be held in Charlotte, North Carolina. Months out from the planned convention, even as it became apparent that the conditions of the COVID-19 pandemic would render a large in-person convention an unwise risk, incumbent Republican president Donald Trump remained resistant to the prospect of downscaling the convention at which he was to be re-nominated. On June 2, 2020, President Donald Trump (who was to be renominated at the convention) and the Republican National Committee jointly decided to pull the event from Charlotte after the North Carolina state government declined to agree to Trump's demands to allow the convention to take place with a full crowd and without public health measures designed to prevent the spread of disease during the pandemic, such as social distancing and face coverings. Trump chose to relocate the convention to another state, in hopes of circumventing North Carolina's pandemic health restrictions so that Trump could be re-nominated in front of a full-scale in-person convention crowd.

A major party presidential nominating convention had not changed its planned host city since the 1972 Republican National Convention (which was relocated from the originally-scheduled San Diego and was instead held in Miami Beach).

== Selection of Jacksonville ==
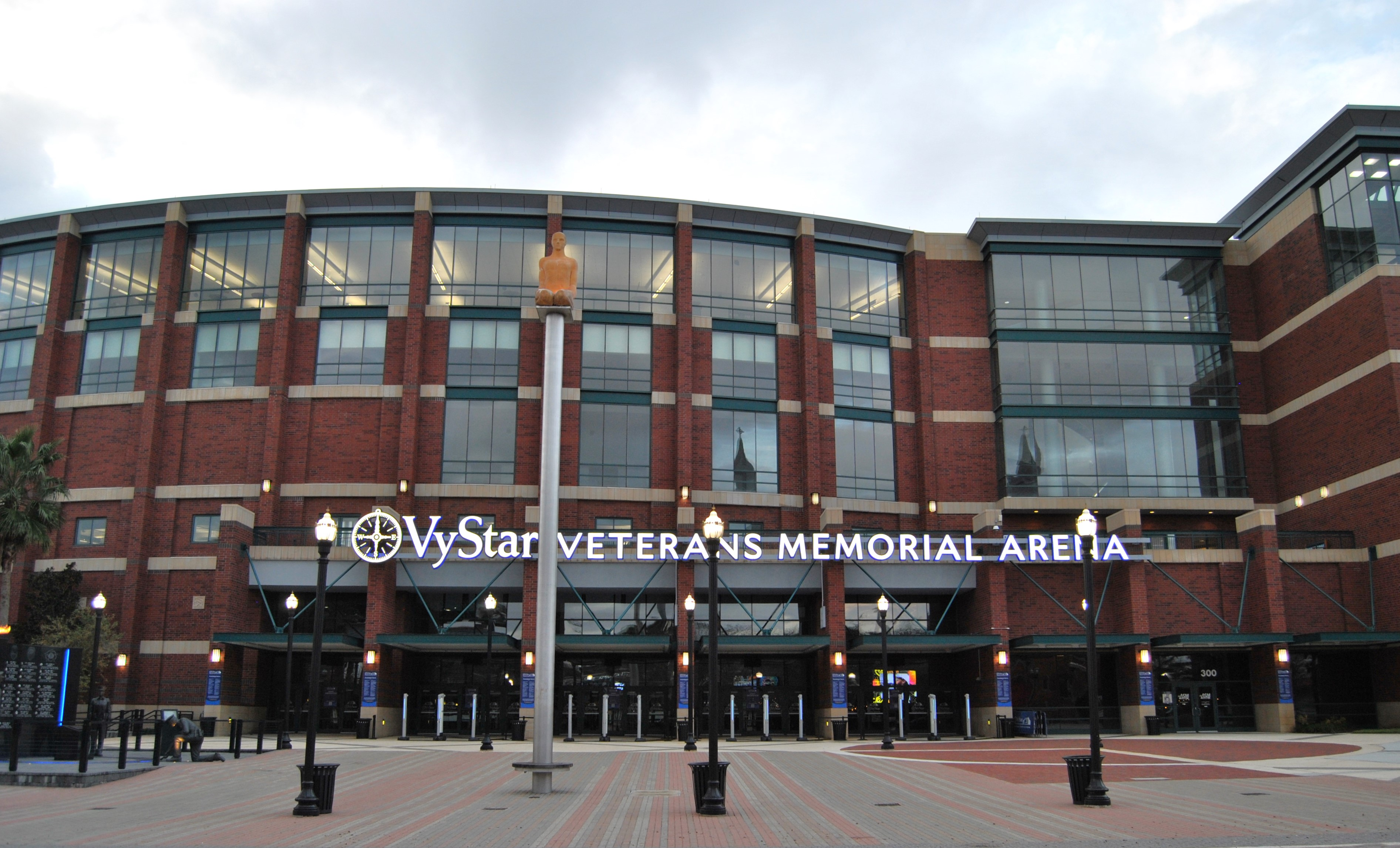
The VyStar Veterans Memorial Arena in Jacksonville, Florida, was to have been the main venue of the 2020 Republican National Convention when plans were shifted to a Jacksonville-based convention.

On May 25, 2020, Trump raised the possibility of moving the convention out of Charlotte after North Carolina's governor, Roy Cooper, stated that the convention would need to be scaled down due to the COVID-19 pandemic. Trump publicly spatted with Cooper, a Democrat, over this. On June 2, 2020, after weeks of failed negotiations, Governor Cooper rejected the plans submitted by the Republican Party to host a full-scale convention. Trump announced the cancellation via tweet, stating, "Because of [Cooper], we are now forced to seek another state to host the 2020 Republican National Convention." Trump accused Cooper of being politically motivated in his refusal to guarantee that full scale crowds would be permitted at the convention, but Cooper argued his focus in doing so was the health and safety of North Carolinians. After the announcement that the convention be moved, Cooper's press spokesperson remarked that the governor had been, "willing to work together with the RNC on a scaled-down event with health and safety measures, but it wouldn't be responsible to guarantee a full arena as the RNC has demanded"

The decision to move the convention away from North Carolina marked the first instance in which a convention had been moved from its originally-selected host city since the location of the 1972 Republican National Convention was shifted from San Diego to Miami Beach.

After Trump's announcements, RNC officials clarified that while most of the convention's activity would be held in a to-be-selected new location, some mechanics of the convention would still be held in Charlotte. By splitting the convention between two cities, this would mark the first-ever instance in which a Republican National Convention had been split between multiple host cities. It would also mark the first instance of a major party nominating convention being centered in two different cities since the 1860 Democratic National Conventions.

In addition to Jacksonville, Republican National Committee officials reportedly considered several other cities located in states with Republican-dominated governments, including Atlanta, Dallas, Nashville, New Orleans, Orlando, Phoenix, and Savannah, and even visited some of these cities. Jacksonville was particularly appealing because not only did Florida have a Republican governing trifecta, but Jacksonville (unlike most other considered cities) had a Republican mayor, Lenny Curry.

On June 11, the Republican National Committee confirmed that the main events and speeches of the convention would move to Jacksonville, Florida, including Trump's nomination acceptance speech on August 27 at the VyStar Veterans Memorial Arena. However the convention's official business was to remain in Charlotte with a greatly reduced agenda and number of delegates. August 24 was to see a portion of the convention hosted in Charlotte, with the following three days of the convention being held in Jacksonville. Republican National Committee Chair Ronna McDaniel highlighted Florida as an electorally important state for the re-election of Trump, and its status as his adopted home state. She touted economic benefit that convention spending would bring to Jacksonville businesses that were struggling amid the impacts of the pandemic.

In announcing the move, the Republican National Committee also encouraged Charlotte to abandon its convention preparations, advising it to"refrain from incurring any additional costs that are no longer necessary as a result of the scaled-down convention that we will host in Charlotte, including hotel rooms, venues, transportation, and security."

This would have been the first time that a major party presidential nominating convention had ever been held in Jacksonville. The state of Florida had previously been the host state for major party conventions in the cities of Miami Beach (1968 RNC, 1972 DNC, 1972 RNC) and Tampa (2012 RNC).

Because major party conventions are logistically complex to stage, the short timeframe in which organizers in Jacksonville had to plan for one posed significant challenges. Of the ability for Jacksonville to organize for such a large event in such a timeframe, Jacksonville Mayor Lenny Curry exclaimed, "What city would take on the Republican National Convention with just 75 days to pull it off? Probably not many. But Jacksonville isn't just any city."

== Reactions to announcement of Jacksonville as new host ==
==== Reactions by Republican officials in Florida ====
Florida Republicans celebrated the selection of Jacksonville. Florida Governor Ron DeSantis, who was himself from Jacksonville, remarked, "Florida is honored to host this special event…Jacksonville is a great city that will showcase Florida's energy, facilities, entrepreneurship and commitment to bring together the delegates of the Republican Party at a historic time in our nation’s history."

Joe Gruters, chairman of the Republican Party of Florida, remarked,

The Republican Party of Florida is delighted that Jacksonville will host the Republican National Convention. The energy and excitement is already building in the Sunshine State for the opportunity to celebrate President Donald J. Trump delivering his acceptance speech. The convention will bring visitors and attendees from all across the country to Jacksonville, a beautiful Florida city on the Atlantic Ocean offering hotel space, top-notch convention facilities, beautiful weather, beaches and a lot of Republicans — just an overall outstanding venue. There is no better place to host the Republican National Convention than in the nation’s largest swing state that is also home to President Trump and to the country’s best Governor, Ron DeSantis.

Jimmy Patronis, the chief financial officer of Florida, argued that the event would help remediate the impacts pandemic-induced economic downturn in Jacksonville, asserting,

Before this pandemic, Florida was welcoming 900 people a day to our state. While they were coming to Florida because of our beaches, our communities, and our low taxes they were also escaping states that were indifferent to business and opportunity. With the Republican National Convention now headed to Jacksonville, the state of North Carolina is going through the same emotions that the democratic leaders of New York and New Jersey have experienced over the past few years – the feeling of losing their businesses, their capital investments, and their people to the state of Florida. Governor DeSantis and Jacksonville’s Mayor Lenny Curry deserve a huge round of applause for this major accomplishment. With President Trump now a Florida resident, this was an easy decision. As Florida continues to recover from the COVID-19 shutdowns, the economic opportunities that will arise from the convention coming to Florida will help in getting our state’s revenues back.

Other Florida Republican officials, such as U.S. Senator Rick Scott, also expressed excitement and approval.

==== Reactions by Democratic officials in Florida ====
Many Florida Democratic officials expressed concern or outright opposition to the convention being staged in Jacksonville. Concerns about public health risks and a divisive political climate were noted.

Terrie Rizzo, the chair of the Florida Democratic Party, remarked,

I sincerely hope that the Republican Party is successful in keeping everyone safe at their events. However, I am deeply concerned that the impetus for moving their highest profile event to Florida was because Donald Trump wanted to give a speech to a crowd of people not social distancing -- and, given his previous public events, likely not wearing masks. Those are safety protocols set forth by his own administration’s public health experts to prevent the spread of COVID-19. Donald Trump abandoned North Carolina because he wants it to look like the threat of the coronavirus is over when he gives his big televised speech. Unfortunately, optics are not a public health strategy, nor are they a good re-election strategy. No speech this president makes can successfully gloss over his failed coronavirus response to Americans who have watched this president dither for months as more than 44 million have filed for unemployment benefits and 113,000 have lost their lives. Trump is coming to Florida to throw himself a big party -- but it’s looking more and more like a goodbye party to his chance at a second term in the White House.

Amid news that the city was favored to land the convention, Jacksonville City Council President-Designate (and former mayor) Tommy Hazouri, a Democrat, remarked that they had mixed feelings about Jacksonville hosting the event, remarking, "our city is divided right now, but we're trying to come together. No one invites guests to their home when the family isn't unified."

State Senator Audrey Gibson, a Democrat representing Jacksonville, expressed disapproval, remarking, "The unfortunate circumstance is that we have the most divisive president ever. And the idea of the disruption that would be created in Jacksonville is something we can live without."

=== Charlotte reactions ===
After the convention relocation to Jacksonville was announced, the Charlotte city government put out a statement which read,

The City Attorney and members of his staff have been meeting regularly with the legal representatives of the Republican National Committee and other parties to the convention agreements. The City of Charlotte remains willing to work in good faith to complete its contractual obligations under the terms of the two Convention agreements. The City has not been officially informed of the RNC’s intent to relocate the convention. Considering the media reports of the RNC’s apparent unilateral decision to relocate a substantial portion of the convention to Jacksonville, an immediate discussion with the RNC and our partners regarding contractual obligations and remedies resulting from this apparent decision is required.

The Charlotte 2020 Host Committee that had been planning for a convention in that city put out a statement reading,

We have learned from news reports that the Republican National Committee has moved the convention from Charlotte to Jacksonville, Florida. Though there have been some conversations about business meetings being held in our city, nothing has been confirmed to us. This decision is in clear violation of the agreements made with the City of Charlotte, the County of Mecklenburg, Charlotte Regional Visitors Authority, and the Charlotte Host Committee. Unfortunately, this action most directly impacts our hospitality and tourism partners, small businesses, and vendors counting on the economic impact of the promised events.

== Host committee ==
Jacksonville formed their own host committee after being awarded the convention. The committee's members were announced in mid-June. Jacksonville mayor Lenny Curry and Brian D. Ballard (a lobbyist) as co-chairs the committee. The committee had originally named 32 initial members, including the two co-chairs. The initial 32 members announced were:

- Lenny Curry (co-chair), mayor of Jacksonville
- Brian D. Ballard (co-chair), lobbyist
- Fernando Acosta-Rua, Pet Paradise president and CEO
- Andy Allen, Corner Lot Properties founder
- Maximo Alvarez, Sunshine Gasoline Distributors founder
- John Baker, FRP Holdings, Inc. chairman and CEO
- Pam Bondi, former Florida attorney general
- Rob Bradley, Florida state senator
- Ed Burr, president and CEO of GreenPointe Holdings, LLC
- Robert Coker, U.S. Sugar senior vice president
- Michael Corrigan, Visit Jacksonville president and CEO
- J. David Coxwell, J.B. Coxwell Contracting president
- Jodi Coxwell, wife of J. David Coxwell
- Travis Cummings, Florida state representative
- Daniel Davis, JAX Chamber president and CEO
- Carol Dover, Florida Restaurant and Lodging Association president and CEO
- Nat Ford, Jacksonville Transportation Authority CEO
- Bill Galvano, president of the Florida Senate
- Josh Garrison, Miranda Contracting president
- Leon L. Haley Jr., health official
- Vaughn McLaughin, bishop
- Rick Morales, Morales Construction Co. president
- José R. Oliva, speaker of the Florida House of Representatives
- Tom Petway, businessman
- Ty Petway, US Assure CEO
- John Rood, The Vestcor Companies founder;
- John Rutherford, U.S. congressman
- Wilton Simpson, Florida Senate president-designate
- Chris Sprowls, Florida House of Representatives speaker-designate
- Kent Stermon, Total Military Management COO
- Aundra Wallace, JAXUSA Partnership president
- Mike Waltz, U.S. Congressman

After the initial members were announced, Bishop Vaughn McLaughlin denied his participation, despite having been listed as a member. Leon Haley Jr. left his position on the committee days after his membership was announced.

The committee reported having raised $4,650,135.20. As of October 2020, the committee had $840,000 in unspent funds.

== Venues ==
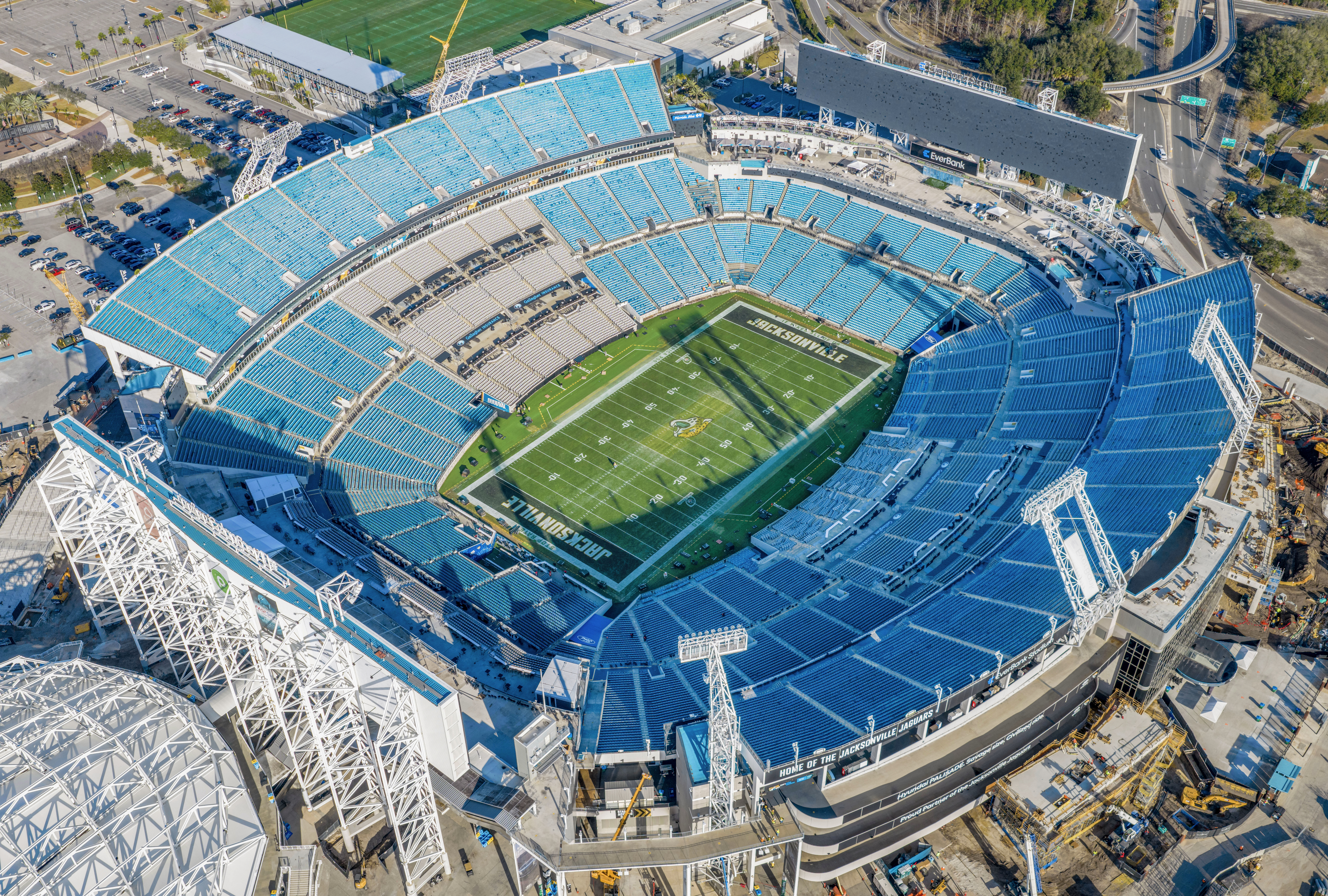
The venue plan would have made use of TIAA Bank Field (pictured)

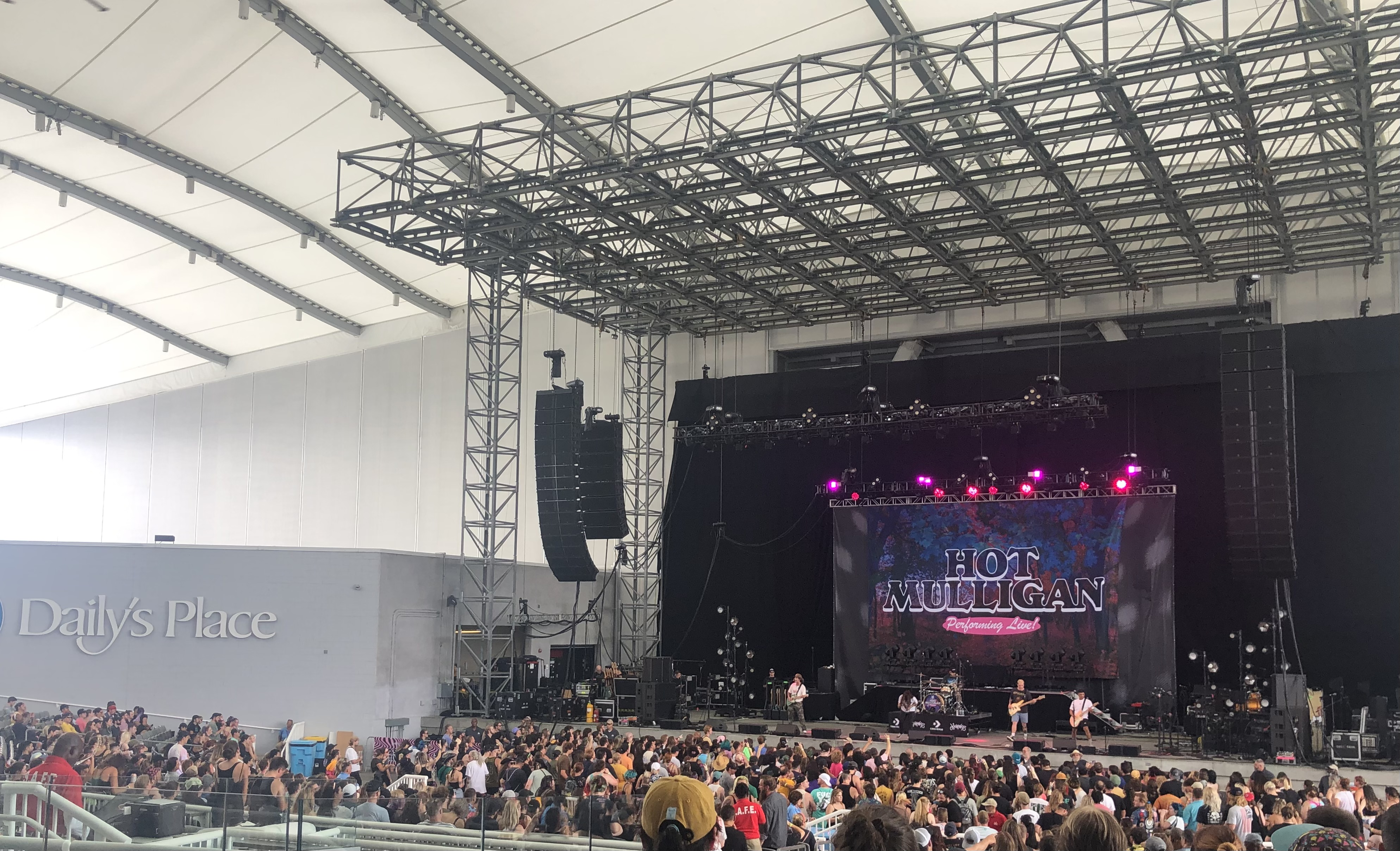
The venue plan would have made use of Daily's Place (pictured)

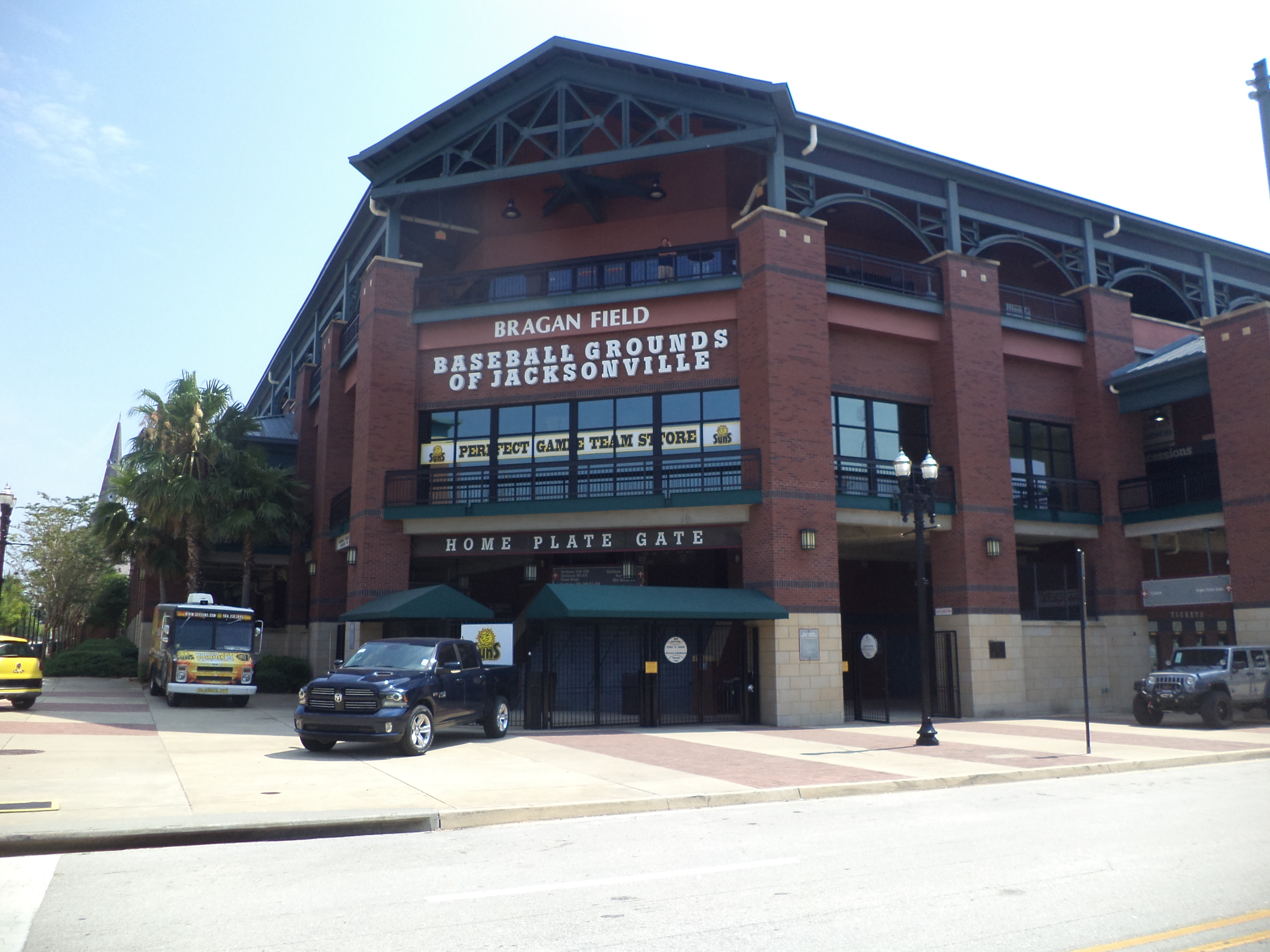
The venue plan would have made use of 121 Financial Park (pictured)

The main venue of the convention was to be the 15,000-seat VyStar Veterans Memorial Arena in Jacksonville. On July 16, the Jacksonville Republican National Convention Host Committee sent out a letter announcing that, in addition to the VyStar Veterans Memorial Arena, other venues in Jacksonville would be used, including TIAA Bank Field, Daily's Place, 121 Financial Park, and "several other" venues.

Some business matters of the convention were still to be remain in Charlotte, while the most prominent components of the convention (including Trump's acceptance speech) were to be staged in Jacksonville. The remaining Charlotte components were to be attended by only 336 out of the more than 2,000 convention delegates. Jacksonville was to expect a large influx of visitor traffic for the convention, with between 20,000 and 50,000 people predicted to visit the city for the convention.

== Security ==
The Republican National Convention was designated as a National Special Security Event. The originally-planned Charlotte convention had been awarded this status. The plans for a convention in Jacksonville had also been awarded this status. Jacksonville had been given $30 million federal grants for security.

The City of Jacksonville paid $69,777 to a consulting company that was assisting them in security.

Alarm was expressed by Duval County Sheriff Mike Williams over the ability of local law enforcement to provide security due to poor funding and lack of advance planning as a result of the late change of venue. Williams expressed his belief that his department would be unable to stage sufficient security for the event on such short notice.

== Hotels ==
A limited number of hotel rooms in its metro area was a possible shortcoming of Jacksonville as a host, which the city sought to assuage Republican National Committee concerns of when seeking the rights to host the convention. When the city had previously been the site of the Super Bowl in 2005, it had had to make use of cruise ships in order to provide enough overnight accommodations for visitors.

=== Delegate hotel assignments ===
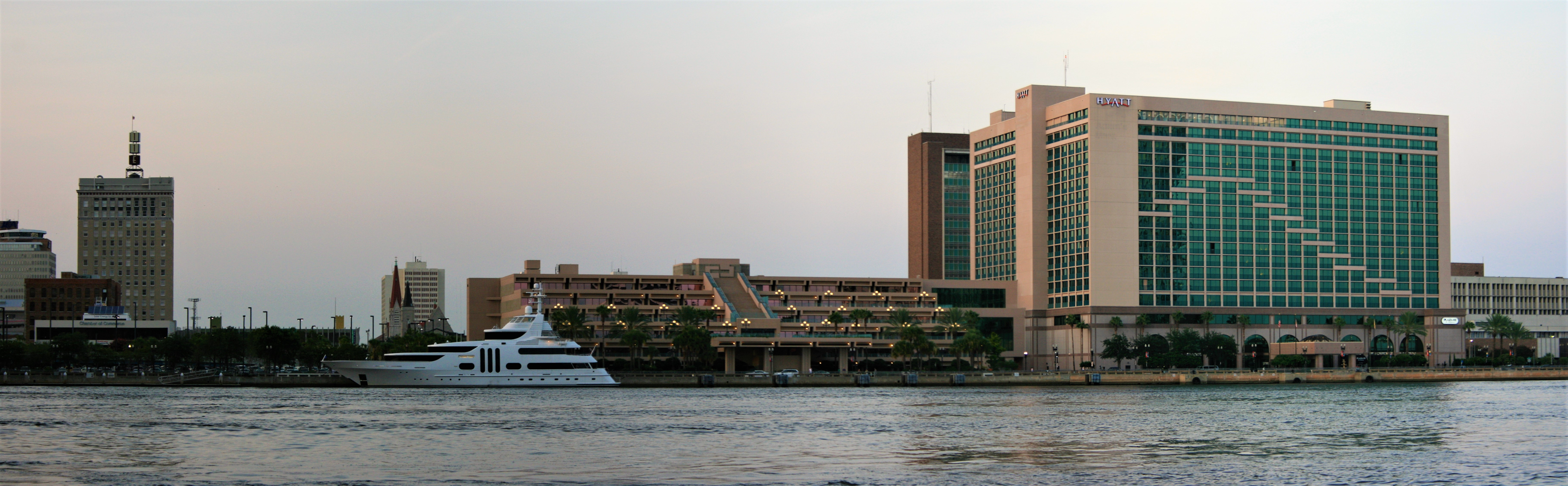
The Hyatt Regency Jacksonville (pictured) was to house delegates from Florida and New Hampshire

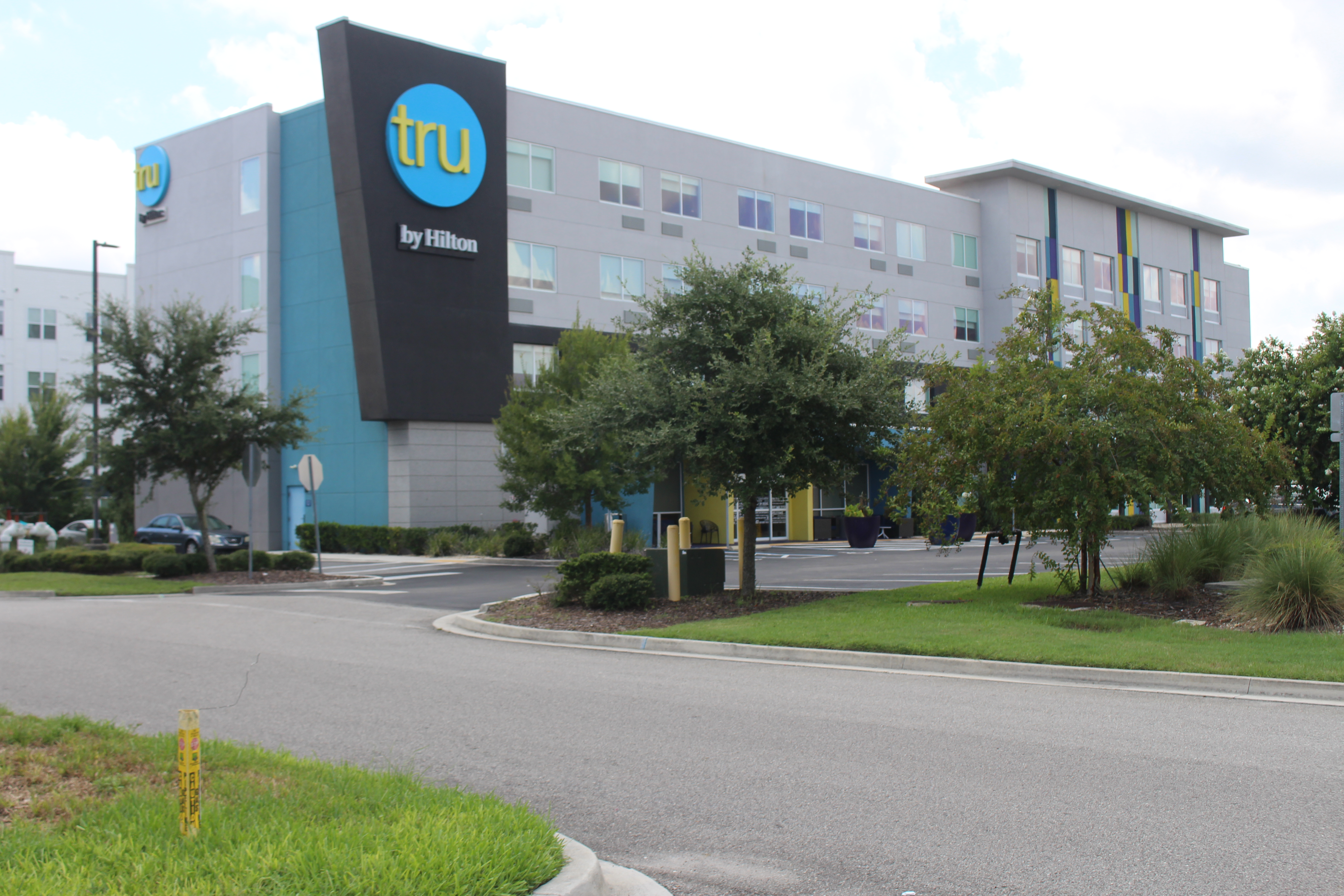
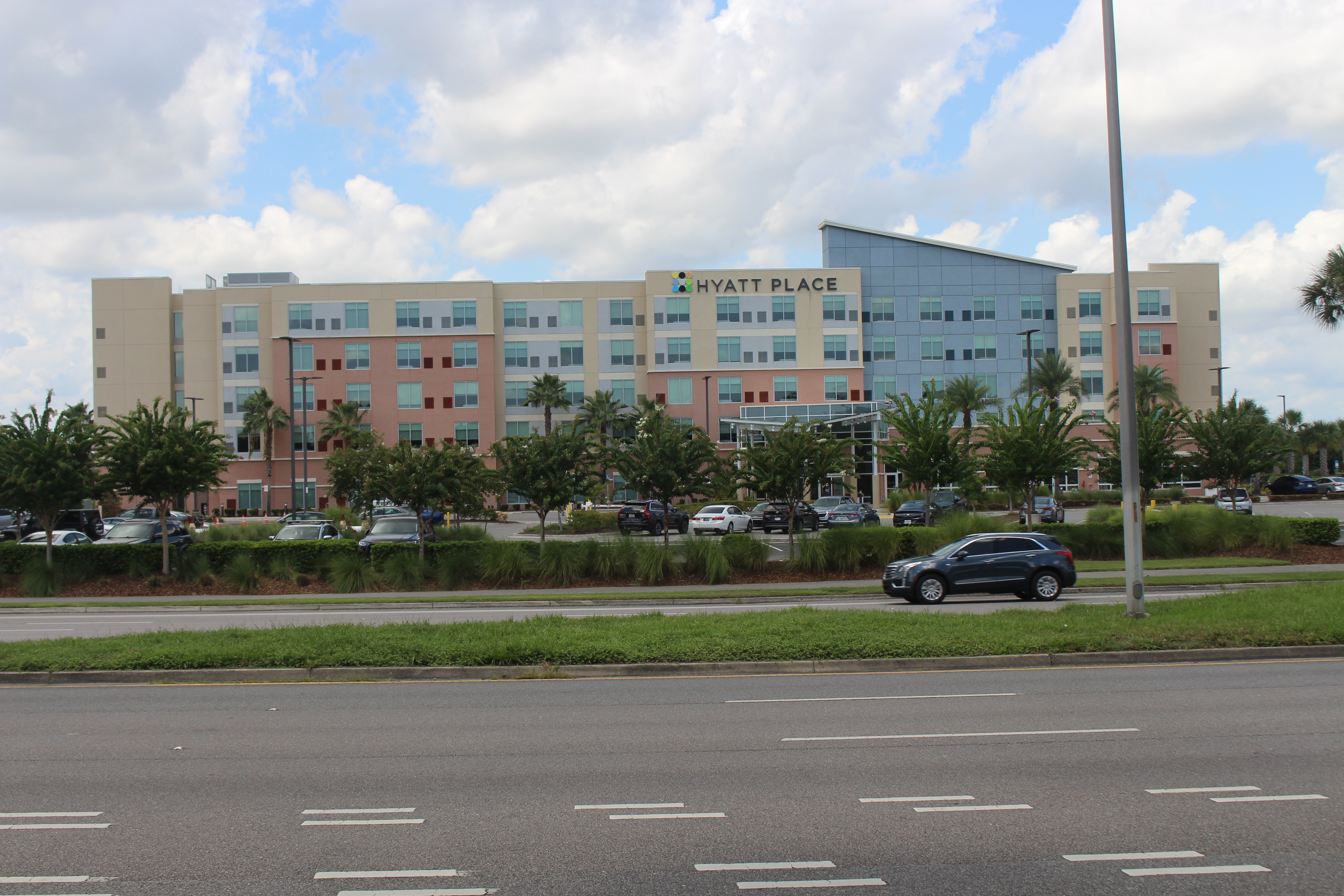
Wisconsin delegates were to stay at Tru by Hilton Jacksonville St Johns Town Center (left) and Hyatt Place Jacksonville/St. Johns Town Center (right)

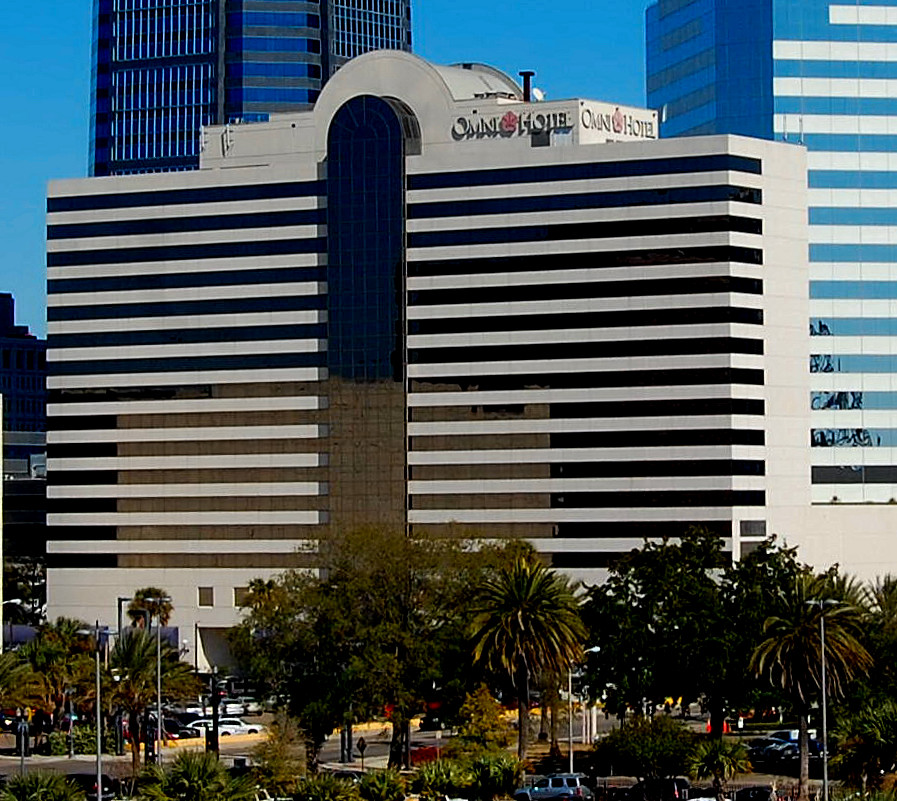
Omni Jacksonville (pictured) was to house all delegates from Michigan and some delegates from North Carolina

Convention planners had distributed a memo in July assigning state delegations the hotels they would have stayed at.

Planned delegate hotel assignments
Municipality	Hotel	Chain	Delegations
Jacksonville	Aloft Jacksonville Airport	Aloft Hotels	West Virginia
Jacksonville	Best Western Premier Jacksonville	Best Western	Washington
Jacksonville	Best Western Southside Hotel & Suites (Orange Park)	Best Western	Minnesota
Jacksonville	Comfort Suites Baymeadows Near Butler Blvd	Comfort Suites	District of Columbia
Jacksonville	Comfort Suites Jacksonville Airport	Comfort Suites	Connecticut
Jacksonville	Crowne Plaza Jacksonville Airport/I-95N	Crowne Plaza	New York; Nevada
Jacksonville	DoubleTree by Hilton Jacksonville Airport	DoubleTree by Hilton	North Carolina (part of delegation)
Jacksonville	DoubleTree by Hilton Hotel Jacksonville Riverfront	DoubleTree by Hilton	Iowa; Mississippi
Jacksonville	Embassy Suites by Hilton Jacksonville Baymeadows	Embassy Suites	South Carolina
Jacksonville	Fairfield Inn & Suites Jacksonville Airport	Fairfield by Marriott	Nebraska
Jacksonville	Hampton Inn Jacksonville Beach/Oceanfront	Hampton by Hilton	Idaho; Pennsylvania (part of delegation); Tennessee
Jacksonville	Hampton Inn & Suites Jacksonville-Airport	Hampton Inn	New Jersey (part of delegation)
Jacksonville	Hampton Inn & Suites Jacksonville - Beach Boulevard/Mayo Clinic Area	Hampton Inn	Kansas; Montana
Jacksonville	Hilton Garden Inn Jacksonville Airport	Hilton Garden Inn	Guam; New Jersey (part of delegation); Northern Mariana Islands; Utah;
Jacksonville	Hilton Garden Inn Jacksonville JTB Deerwood	Hilton Garden Inn	Virginia (part of delegation)
Jacksonville	Holiday Inn Express & Suites Jacksonville Airport	Holiday Inn Express	Delaware; Massachusetts
Jacksonville	Holiday Inn Jacksonville E 295 Baymeadows	Holiday Inn	Colorado
Jacksonville	Hotel Indigo Jacksonville-Deerwood Park	Hotel Indigo	Missouri
Jacksonville	Hyatt Place Jacksonville/St. Johns Town Center	Hyatt Place	Wisconsin (part of delegation)
Jacksonville	Hyatt Regency Jacksonville	Hyatt Regency	Florida; New Hampshire
Jacksonville	Marriott Jacksonville	Marriott Hotels	Arizona
Jacksonville	Omni Jacksonville Hotel	Omni Hotels	Michigan; North Carolina (part of delegation)
Jacksonville	Ramada by Wyndham Jacksonville Hotel & Conference Center	Ramada	New Mexico; North Dakota
Jacksonville	Residence Inn by Marriott Jacksonville Airport	Residence Inn by Marriott	Rhode Island
Jacksonville	Residence Inn by Marriott Jacksonville Butler Boulevard	Residence Inn by Marriott	Alaska
Jacksonville	Sheraton Hotel Jacksonville	Sheraton Hotels	Georgia
Jacksonville	Southbank Hotel Jacksonville Riverwalk	Lexington	Maryland; Ohio
Jacksonville	Springhill Suites Jacksonville	Springhill Suites	Oregon; Virginia (part of delegation)
Jacksonville	TownePlace Suites by Marriott Jacksonville Butler Boulevard	TownePlace Suites	Maine
Jacksonville	Tru by Hilton Jacksonville St Johns Town Center	Tru by Hilton	Wisconsin (part of delegation)
Fernandina Beach	Home2 Suites by Hilton Fernandina Amelia Island	Home2 Suites by Hilton	Oklahoma; U.S. Virgin Islands
Fernandina Beach	Hampton Inn Amelia Island at Fernandina Beach	Hampton Inn	American Samoa; Puerto Rico; Vermont
Jacksonville Beach	Four Points by Sheraton Jacksonville Beachfront	Four Points by Sheraton	Pennsylvania (part of delegation)
Jacksonville Beach	Holiday Inn Express Jacksonville Beach	Holiday Inn	Arkansas
Orange Park	Courtyard Jacksonville Orange Park	Courtyard by Marriott	Louisiana
Orange Park	Hampton Inn & Suites Jacksonville/Orange Park	Hampton Inn	Illinois (part of delegation)
Orange Park	Hilton Garden Inn Jacksonville Orange Park	Hilton Garden Inn	Illinois (part of delegation)
Orange Park	Holiday Inn & Suites Orange Park - Wells Rd	Holiday Inn	Kentucky
Ponte Verde Beach	Sawgrass Marriott Golf Resort & Spa	Marriott	Hawaii; South Dakota; Texas
St. Augustine	Holiday Inn World Golf Village-St. Augustine	Holiday Inn	California (part of delegation)
St. Augustine	World Golf Village Renaissance St. Augustine Resort	Renaissance Hotels	Alabama; California (part of delegation)

== Cancellation ==
With an explosive increase of COVID-19 cases in Florida (peaking at above 15,000 cases per day in mid-July), the possibility of the Jacksonville convention being canceled as well began to be discussed. Several of the local health restrictions in Charlotte that had prompted the RNC to seek a different location—requirements for people to wear masks and practice social distancing—were later adopted by Jacksonville. Sen. Chuck Grassley, who was 86 years old, said he would skip the convention for the first time in 40 years due to the risk posed by COVID-19.

On July 23, Trump announced that RNC events scheduled in Jacksonville, Florida, had been cancelled, saying, "The timing for the event is not right." However, Trump also announced that delegate business would still continue in Charlotte. A downscaled convention largely centered in Washington, D.C. was held instead of a full-scale one centered mainly in Jacksonville.

== See also ==
- Logistics of the 2020 Democratic National Convention
