= Chase Center on the Riverfront =

Convention center in Wilmington, Delaware, US

Coordinates: 39.731148°N 75.563060°W

- Interactive map of Chase Center on the Riverfront
- Address: 815 Justison Street
- Location: Wilmington, Delaware
- Public transit: DART First State bus: 25
- Capacity: 92,000 square feet

Construction
- Opened: 1999
- Architect: Gant Brunett Architects

Website
- centerontheriverfront.com

Chase Center on the Riverfront is a 92,000 square foot convention center in Wilmington, Delaware, United States. It hosts various local concerts, conventions, and banquets for the Wilmington area.

== History ==
The facility was originally built as a ship assembly plant for the Dravo Corporation during World War II. After the shipyard was closed, efforts were made to revitalize the Wilmington riverfront similar to the Inner Harbor in nearby Baltimore. In 1998, the reconstructed facility opened as the First USA Riverfront Arts Center, a 120,000-square-foot hall holding museum-quality exhibits. The center was made for traveling special exhibitions with the designers specifically copying the role of the Florida International Museum. The facility featured 25,000 square feet of galleries, a 6,000-square-foot gift shop and a 13,000-square-foot lobby, with design touches such as a terrazo floor with a compass rose design. The cost was $10 million and included $2.5 million in funding from First USA Bank which purchased the naming rights. It was built to complement the Shipyard Shops outlet mall, built at the same time, but which went defunct in 2009.

In 2002, the facility was occupied by the Delaware Art Museum as temporary exhibition space until their facility reconstruction opened in 2005. In January 2003, concurrent with the deprecation of the First USA brand by Bank One, the building was renamed the Bank One Center on the Riverfront. After the Delaware Art Museum moved out, renovation began to transition the facility into a convention center and banquet hall, and the center was rededicated in 2005. In 2007, after Chase Bank's merger with Bank One, the building was renamed the Chase Center on the Riverfront. In 2014, a 180-room Westin hotel, the first new hotel in Wilmington since 1980, opened adjacent to the Chase Center.

== Events ==
Major shows include the Delaware Antique Show, one of the oldest shows in the state of Delaware, the Miss Delaware USA and Miss Delaware Teen USA beauty pageants, and the Pennsylvania Guild of Craftsmen Fine Craft Fair. The facility has also hosted the Delaware Democratic Party's Jefferson-Jackson Dinner, funerals for police officers, and some political rallies.

In 2020, part of the 2020 Democratic National Convention was held at the Chase Center, with the Democratic Party nominees for President and Vice President, Joe Biden and Kamala Harris, performing their acceptance speeches from a closed stage inside the venue. Due to the COVID-19 pandemic, the Democratic National Convention had been reformatted as a virtual event with no in-person gatherings in its formal host city of Milwaukee. Democratic Party activists and officials were invited to view the broadcast Biden's acceptance speech from their cars in the parking lot of the adjacent Frawley Stadium. Following the acceptance speech, Biden, Harris, and their families made an appearance before the parking lot, and there was a fireworks show.

On election night 2020 (November 3), Biden held a drive-in election night party in its parking lot. On the evening of November 7, 2020, after media outlets had projected him the winner of the election, President-elect Biden gave his victory speech from an outdoor stage by the Chase Center. Following the victory speech, there was a fireworks and drone light show.
