= Schedule of the 2020 Republican National Convention =

Event schedule (August 24–27, 2020)

The 2020 Republican National Convention was held August 24–27, 2020. Due to the impacts of the COVID-19 pandemic, it was staged without an audience for most of its program, and with many components having been pre-recorded. The convention was preceded by pre-convention meetings. The convention opened on August 24 with an in-person morning session in Charlotte, North Carolina. The remainder of the convention, beginning that evening, consisted of evening sessions centered primarily in Washington, D.C.

== Pre-convention meetings ==
=== Committee on Platform ===
Rather than adopting a new party platform, uniquely the Republicans decided simply to recycle their 2016 party platform, including several references to the "current president" and attacks on "the administration" (which in 2016 referred to Barack Obama and the Obama administration). The decision was criticized by Republican activists. In a tweet, Trump said that he would "prefer a new and updated platform, short form, if possible."

The RNC did not do this, just issuing a one-page document stating opposition to the "Obama/Biden administration" and supporting President Trump's instead.

=== Republican National Committee meetings ===
The Republican National Committee had its semi-annual meeting from August 21 to 23. It was closed to the press.

The convention, as originally planned to be held in Charlotte, was initially anticipated to attract 50,000 visitors to the city.

The ultimate format of the convention had much of its content be prerecorded.

== Charlotte: August 24 morning session ==
Republican National Convention Official Re-Nomination
- Official convention stream via YouTube

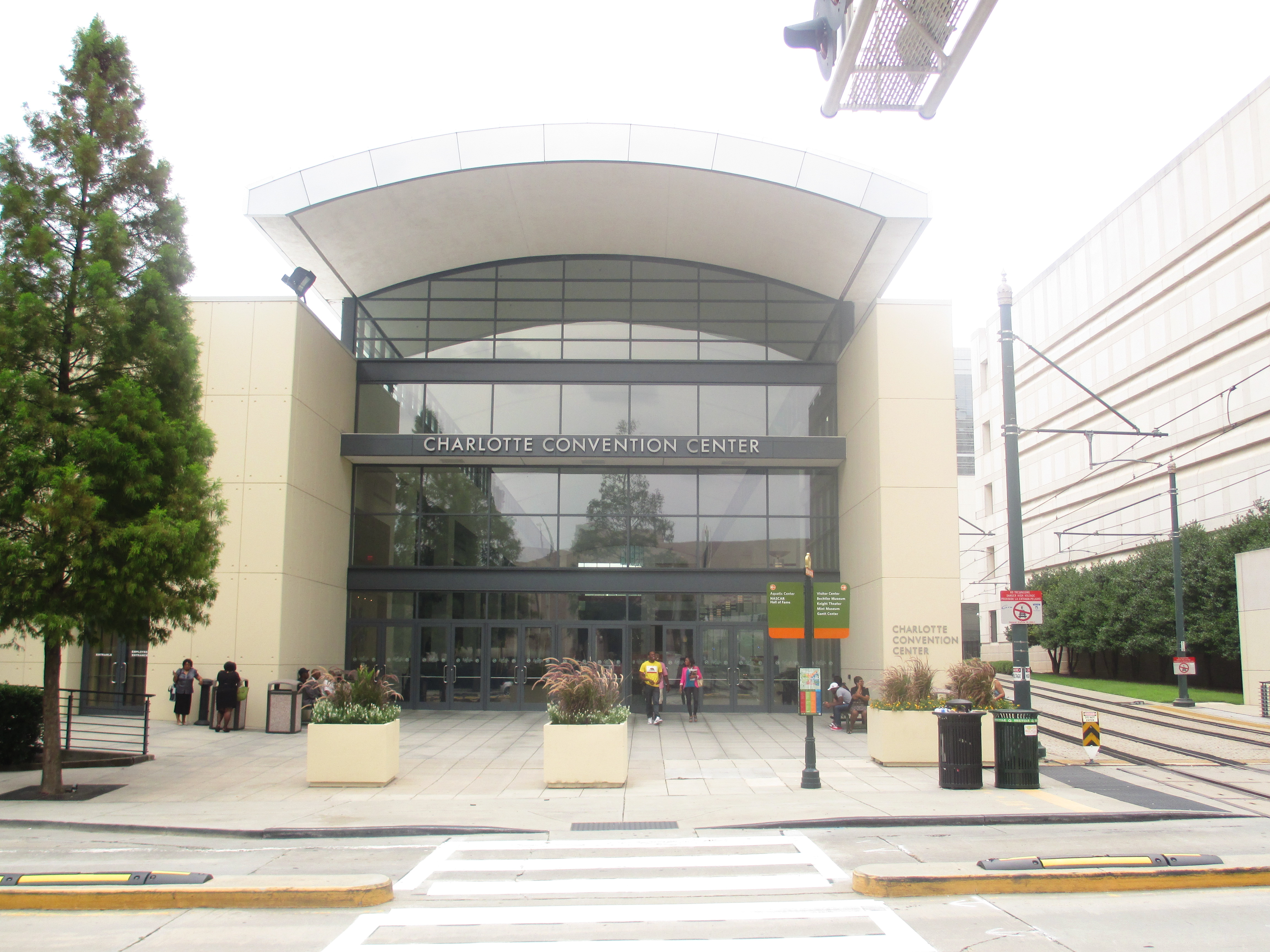
The Charlotte Convention Center was the site of the August 24 morning session of the convention

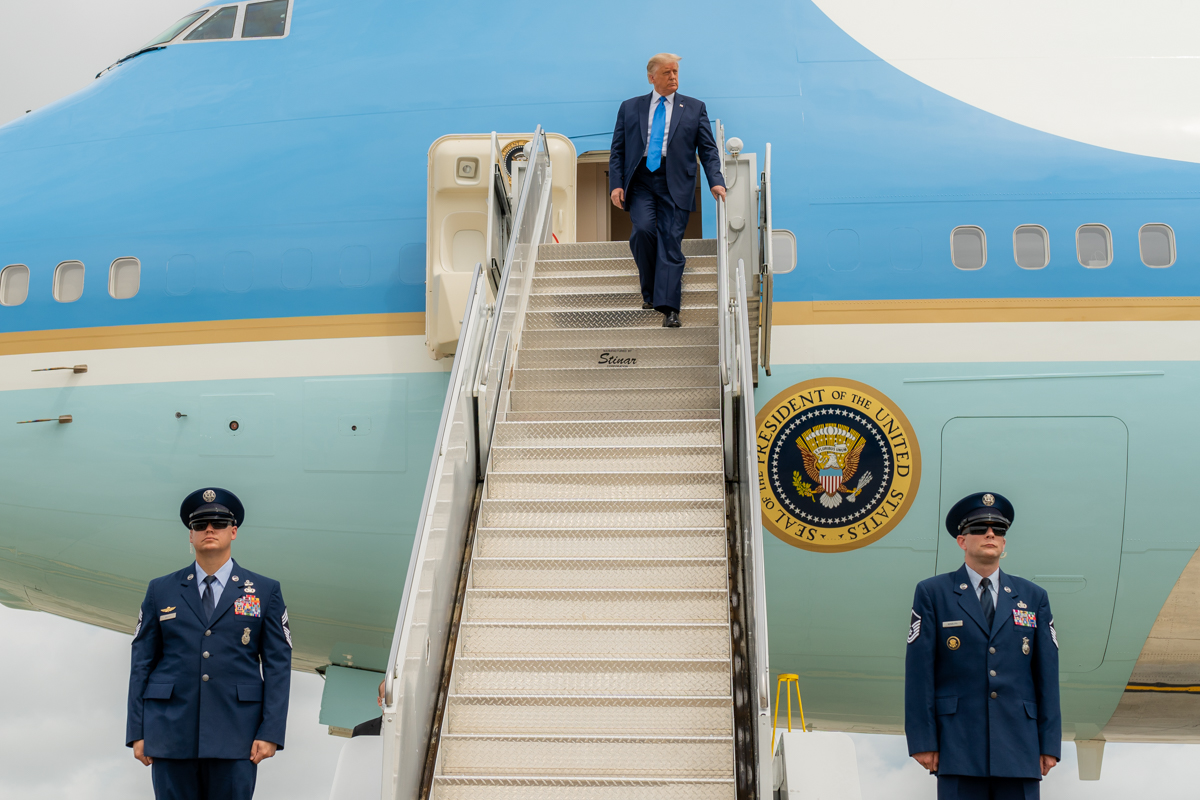
President Trump arriving in Charlotte for the morning session of the convention

The official business of the 2020 Republican National Convention, including the formal nominations of President Trump and Vice President Pence, was held in Charlotte, North Carolina.

The 336 delegates met in the morning from 9 a.m. EDT, after which the committee reports were read and voted on.

The business meeting also included votes on nomination. Scott Walker placed Pence's name in nomination. Pence was nominated by voice vote. This was the first time the vice-presidential nomination came first. Michael Whatley, the chair of the North Carolina Republican Party, placed the president's name in nomination and Florida state senator Joe Gruters seconded the nomination. This was followed by the traditional roll-call of the states.

The roll-call was interrupted by addresses from Walker, Vice President Pence, and President Trump himself, who spoke over an hour. All of them addressed the crowd in-person, having flown to Charlotte.

=== Charlotte speech schedule ===
Select speakers:

Speaker	Position/notability	Location	Notes	Cite
Ronna McDaniel	Chair of the Republican National Committee	Charlotte Convention Center in Charlotte, North Carolina	MC of the business session.	
Scott Walker	Former governor of Wisconsin	Charlotte Convention Center in Charlotte, North Carolina	Roll call address	
Mike Pence	Nominee for second term as vice president of the United States	Charlotte Convention Center in Charlotte, North Carolina	Pre-acceptance thank-you speech	
Donald Trump	Nominee for a second term as president of the United States	Charlotte Convention Center in Charlotte, North Carolina	Pre-acceptance MAGA rally speech	

== Washington, D.C.: August 24–27 ==
After the formal business of the convention in Charlotte concluded, the convention moved to Washington, D.C.. Further convention programming (including speeches and entertainment) was conducted in the nation's capital city, as well as several remote locations outside of D.C. In D.C., production for four nights of prime time convention programming was anchored at the Andrew W. Mellon Auditorium in Washington, D.C., where most speeches were filmed. However, various components of the convention were filmed elsewhere, including at locations outside of Washington, D.C.

Most speeches were pre-taped.

At events with in-person audiences, such as First Lady Melania Trump and Vice President Mike Pence's speeches, the Centers for Disease Control and Prevention-recommended practices of protective masks and social distancing were largely absent.

=== August 24: Evening session ===
Republican National Convention Pool Feeds
- Night 1
- from C-SPAN via YouTube
- from PBS NewsHour via YouTube

Theme: Land of promise

8:30–11:00 p.m. EDT

Schedule:

- Invocation
- Pledge of Allegiance
- Main convention program

==== August 24 speech schedule ====
Select speakers (in order of appearance):

Speaker	Position/notability	Location	Notes	Cite
Timothy M. Dolan	Cardinal, Archbishop of New York	New York City, New York	Invocation	
Charlie Kirk	Founder and president of Turning Point USA	Andrew W. Mellon Auditorium in Washington, D.C.		
Matt Gaetz	United States representative from Florida	Andrew W. Mellon Auditorium in Washington, D.C.		
Kimberly Klacik	Candidate for the U.S. House for Maryland's 7th district	Baltimore, Maryland		
Ronna McDaniel	Chair of the Republican National Committee	Andrew W. Mellon Auditorium in Washington, D.C.		
Jim Jordan	United States representative from Ohio			
Herschel Walker	Former football player			
Vernon Jones	Georgia State Representative (Democratic)	Andrew W. Mellon Auditorium in Washington, D.C.		
Andrew Pollack	Father of Stoneman Douglas High School shooting victim	Andrew W. Mellon Auditorium in Washington, D.C.		
Mark and Patricia McCloskey	St. Louis, Missouri, couple involved in an incident with Black Lives Matter protesters in June 2020	St. Louis, Missouri		
Kimberly Guilfoyle	Trump campaign official, girlfriend of Donald Trump Jr., and former Fox News television personality	Andrew W. Mellon Auditorium in Washington, D.C.		
Steve Scalise	United States representative from Louisiana and House minority whip	Andrew W. Mellon Auditorium in Washington, D.C.		
Sean Parnell	U.S. Army veteran and candidate for the U.S. House from Pennsylvania's 17th district	Andrew W. Mellon Auditorium in Washington, D.C.		
Maximo Alvarez	Cuban exile, Sunshine Gasoline Distributors founder and president	Andrew W. Mellon Auditorium in Washington, D.C.		
Nikki Haley	Former United States ambassador to the United Nations and former governor of South Carolina	Andrew W. Mellon Auditorium in Washington, D.C.		
Donald Trump Jr.	Executive vice president of the Trump Organization and son of the presidential nominee	Andrew W. Mellon Auditorium in Washington, D.C.		
Tim Scott	United States senator from South Carolina	Andrew W. Mellon Auditorium in Washington, D.C.		

Select film segments:

- Conversation with COVID-19 frontline workers in the East Room of the White House (featuring President Donald Trump)
- Conversation with released overseas prisoners Diplomatic Reception Room of the White House (featuring President Donald Trump)

=== Tuesday, August 25 ===
Republican National Convention pool feeds
- Night 2
- from C-SPAN via YouTube
- from PBS NewsHour via YouTube

8:30–11:00 p.m. EDT

Theme: Land of opportunity

- Invocation by Pastor Norma Urrabazo
- Main convention ceremony

==== August 25 speech schedule ====
Select speakers (in order of appearance):

Speaker	Position/notability	Location	Notes	Cite
Norma Urrabazo	Pastor	Andrew W. Mellon Auditorium in Washington, D.C.	Invocation	
Myron Lizer	Vice president of the Navajo Nation	Shiprock Pinnacle in New Mexico		
Rand Paul	United States senator from Kentucky	Andrew W. Mellon Auditorium in Washington, D.C.		
Larry Kudlow	Director of the National Economic Council	Redding, Connecticut		
Cissie Graham Lynch	Daughter of Franklin Graham and granddaughter of Billy Graham	Andrew W. Mellon Auditorium in Washington, D.C.		
Robert Vlaisavljevich	Mayor of Eveleth, Minnesota (Democratic)	Eveleth City Hall in Eveleth, Minnesota		
Abby Johnson	Author known for anti-abortion film Unplanned	Andrew W. Mellon Auditorium in Washington, D.C.		
Nicholas Sandmann	Kentucky teen whose interaction with Native American activist Nathan Phillips on the National Mall went viral in 2019.	Lincoln Memorial in Washington, D.C.		
Pam Bondi	Former attorney general of Florida; Impeachment defense counsel.	Andrew W. Mellon Auditorium in Washington, D.C.		
Tiffany Trump	Daughter of the presidential nominee	Andrew W. Mellon Auditorium in Washington, D.C.		
Kim Reynolds	Governor of Iowa	Des Moines, Iowa		
Jeanette Núñez	Lieutenant governor of Florida	Andrew W. Mellon Auditorium in Washington, D.C.		
Eric Trump	Executive vice president of the Trump Organization and son of the presidential nominee	Andrew W. Mellon Auditorium in Washington, D.C.		
Daniel Cameron	Attorney general of Kentucky	Andrew W. Mellon Auditorium in Washington, D.C.		
Mike Pompeo	United States secretary of state	King David Hotel in Jerusalem, Israel		
Melania Trump	First Lady of the United States, spouse of the presidential nominee	White House Rose Garden in Washington, D.C.	speech by wife of presidential nominee	

Mary Ann Mendoza had also been scheduled to speak. However, just hours before her part in the program, she posted a tweet in support of an antisemitic conspiracy theory and specifically highlighted its reference to the Protocols of the Elders of Zion. The RNC immediately canceled her appearance.

Select video segments:

- Donald Trump pardoning Jon Ponder at the White House
- Naturalization ceremony at the White House (featuring Donald Trump and Chad Wolf)
President Trump pardoning Jon Ponder

President Trump participating in a naturalization ceremony

=== Wednesday, August 26 ===
Republican National Convention Pool Feeds
- Night 3
- from C-SPAN via YouTube
- from PBS NewsHour via YouTube

8:30–11:00 p.m. EDT

Schedule:

- Invocation by Rabbi Aryeh Spero
- Pledge of Allegiance by Joseph Deslauriers
- Main convention program
- Performance of the national anthem ("The Star-Spangled Banner") by Trace Adkins

Theme: Land of heroes

==== August 26 speech schedule ====
Select speakers (in order of appearance):

Speaker	Position/notability	Location	Notes	Cite
Aryeh Spero	Rabbi	Andrew W. Mellon Auditorium in Washington, D.C.	Invocation Incorrectly listed as Shubert Spero by the RNC	
Kristi Noem	Governor of South Dakota	Andrew W. Mellon Auditorium in Washington, D.C.		
Scott Dane	Executive director of the Associated Contract Loggers & Truckers of Minnesota			
Marsha Blackburn	United States senator from Tennessee	Andrew W. Mellon Auditorium in Washington, D.C.		
Dan Crenshaw	United States representative from Texas	USS Texas BB-35 in La Porte, Texas		
Keith Kellogg	National security advisor to the vice president	Andrew W. Mellon Auditorium in Washington, D.C.		
Kayleigh McEnany	White House Press Secretary	Andrew W. Mellon Auditorium in Washington, D.C.		
Karen Pence	Second Lady of the United States, spouse of the vice-presidential nominee	Andrew W. Mellon Auditorium in Washington, D.C.	speech by wife of VP nominee	
Kellyanne Conway	Counselor to the president	Andrew W. Mellon Auditorium in Washington, D.C.		
Sister Deirdre "Dede" Byrne	Member of the Little Workers of the Sacred Hearts of Jesus and Mary, colonel in the U.S. Army Medical Corps, general surgeon at the Spanish Catholic Center in Washington, D.C., anti-abortion activist	Andrew W. Mellon Auditorium in Washington, D.C.		
Lou Holtz	Former football coach	Orlando, Florida		
Michael McHale	President of the National Association of Police Organizations	Andrew W. Mellon Auditorium in Washington, D.C.		
Elise Stefanik	United States representative from New York	Andrew W. Mellon Auditorium in Washington, D.C.		
Madison Cawthorn	Candidate for the U.S. House from North Carolina's 11th district	Andrew W. Mellon Auditorium in Washington, D.C.		
Jack Brewer	Former football player	Andrew W. Mellon Auditorium in Washington, D.C.		
Chen Guangcheng	Chinese civil rights activist	Andrew W. Mellon Auditorium in Washington, D.C.		
Lee Zeldin	United States representative from New York	Westhampton, New York		
Joni Ernst	United States senator from Iowa			
Burgess Owens	Former professional football player and candidate for the U.S. House of Representatives in Utah	Andrew W. Mellon Auditorium in Washington, D.C.		
Lara Trump	Trump campaign spokesperson and daughter-in-law of the president	Andrew W. Mellon Auditorium in Washington, D.C.		
Clarence Henderson	President of the North Carolina chapter of the Frederick Douglass Foundation	Greensboro, North Carolina		
Richard Grenell	Former United States ambassador to Germany, former acting director of national intelligence	Andrew W. Mellon Auditorium in Washington, D.C.		
Mike Pence	Nominee for vice president, Vice President of the United States	Fort McHenry National Monument in Baltimore, Maryland	Vice-presidential nomination acceptance speech	

=== Thursday, August 27 ===
Republican National Convention Pool Feeds
- Night 4
- from C-SPAN via YouTube
- from PBS NewsHour via YouTube

8:30–11:00 p.m. EDT

Theme: Land of greatness

==== August 27 speech schedule ====
Schedule:

- Invocation by Franklin Graham
- Pledge of Allegiance performed by Madeleine and Jackson Kratzer
- Main convention program
- Fireworks
- Musical performance by Christopher Macchio

Speakers (in order of appearance):

Speaker	Position/notability	Location	Notes	Cite
Franklin Graham	Christian evangelist, son of Billy Graham	Andrew W. Mellon Auditorium in Washington, D.C.	Invocation	
Kevin McCarthy	House minority leader	United States Capitol Grounds in Washington, D.C.		
Ja'Ron Smith	Assistant to the president on domestic policy	Andrew W. Mellon Auditorium in Washington, D.C.		
Jeff Van Drew	United States representative from New Jersey	Andrew W. Mellon Auditorium in Washington, D.C.		
Dan Scavino	White House deputy chief of staff for communications	Andrew W. Mellon Auditorium in Washington, D.C.		
Mitch McConnell	Senate majority leader	Louisville, Kentucky		
Dana White	President of the UFC	Las Vegas, Nevada		
Sean Reyes	Utah attorney general	Andrew W. Mellon Auditorium in Washington, D.C.		
Ann Dorn	Widow of David Dorn	St. Louis, Missouri		
Ben Carson	Secretary of Housing and Urban Development	Andrew W. Mellon Auditorium in Washington, D.C.		
Patrick Lynch	President of the New York City Police Benevolent Association	New York		
Rudy Giuliani	Former mayor of New York City and President Trump's lawyer	Andrew W. Mellon Auditorium in Washington, D.C.		
Tom Cotton	United States senator from Arkansas	Andrew W. Mellon Auditorium in Washington, D.C.		
Carl Mueller	Parents of Kayla Mueller, a humanitarian aid worker who was kidnapped and murdered by ISIS	Andrew W. Mellon Auditorium in Washington, D.C.		
Marsha Mueller	Parents of Kayla Mueller, a humanitarian aid worker who was kidnapped and murdered by ISIS	Andrew W. Mellon Auditorium in Washington, D.C.		
Alice Marie Johnson	Author and former federal prisoner whose sentence was commuted by President Trump in 2018	Andrew W. Mellon Auditorium in Washington, D.C.		
Ivanka Trump	Daughter of presidential nominee and senior advisor to the President	South Lawn of the White House in Washington, D.C.	Introduction speech for Donald Trump	
Donald Trump	Nominee for president, President of the United States	South Lawn of the White House in Washington, D.C.	Presidential nomination acceptance speech	

== See also ==
- Logistics of the 2020 Republican National Convention
- Cancelled plans for 2020 Republican National Convention in Jacksonville
- Schedule of the 2020 Democratic National Convention
