= Mark McCloskey =

Lawyer who brandished weapons at protesters

- Born: Mark Thomas McCloskey; St. Louis, Missouri, U.S.
- Education: Southern Methodist University (BA, JD)
- Occupation: Lawyer
- Years active: 1985–present
- Political party: Republican
- Spouse: Patricia Novak

Mark Thomas McCloskey is an American personal injury lawyer practicing in St. Louis, Missouri, who attracted national attention in 2020 after he and his wife Patricia brandished firearms at protestors who walked past their house on a private street.

The couple was charged with unlawful use of a weapon, a class E felony; they bargained down and pleaded guilty to misdemeanors and were subsequently pardoned by Missouri Governor Mike Parson. In February 2022, McCloskey's law license was suspended indefinitely, but the suspension was stayed while he serves one year of probation.

In 2022, McCloskey ran for a United States Senate seat in Missouri, but he lost the Republican primary to Eric Schmitt.

== Early life and education ==
McCloskey was born in Saint Louis and attended St. Louis Country Day School, graduating in 1975.

He earned his BA in sociology from Southern Methodist University in 1982, and his JD from Southern Methodist's Dedman School of Law in 1985.

== Career ==
McCloskey was admitted to the bar in 1986 in Texas; in 1986, Missouri; in 1986, Nebraska; U.S. District Court, Southern District of Illinois, U.S. District Court, Eastern District of Missouri and to the U.S. Court of Appeals, 7th and 8th Circuits; and 1987, in Illinois. His practice has focused on suits involving traumatic brain injuries, spinal cord injuries, birth injuries, orthopedic injuries and major injuries resulting from car wrecks.

The couple has spent "decades suing their neighbors and family members to protect their property," The Atlantic reported in 2020. They asserted "squatter's rights" on a slice of shared property in their subdivision. They sued a dog breeder from whom they bought a German shepherd.

He is one of the lawyers representing rioters convicted for the January 6 United States Capitol attack and pardoned on the day of Trump's second term-inauguration in their effort to be paid restitution for their prosecutions and incarcerations.

== Confrontation with marchers ==
On June 28, 2020, as part of the George Floyd protests, a group of Black Lives Matter protesters entered the private Portland Place neighborhood. The protestors intended to join a larger body of 500 marchers at the home of St. Louis Mayor Lyda Krewson, who was being protested for publicly reading the names and addresses of locals who had demanded defunding of the St. Louis Metropolitan Police Department. Livestreamed video showed protesters entering the community by walking through an intact gate that a man was holding open. Twenty seconds later, the video shows Mark McCloskey with a rifle outside his house, yelling at protesters. McCloskey later told media that the protesters "smashed through the historic wrought iron gates of Portland Place, destroying them, rushed towards my home...put us in fear for our lives", and also that "the gate came down and a large crowd of angry, aggressive people poured through. I was terrified that we’d be murdered within seconds". While the gate was damaged at some point in time, it was unclear who had damaged it.

As the crowd approached, Mark and Patricia stood outside their front door with a semi-automatic AR-15 and a handgun respectively. McCloskey shouted "private property" and "get out" multiple times. Several protesters confronted the two in front of their home, exchanging heated words only several yards apart. Some protesters were heard asking others to leave and move on, while other protesters were heard threatening the McCloskeys. No shots were fired and there were no injuries. Shortly after the incident, the McCloskeys told reporters that they support the Black Lives Matter movement and civil rights.

There was no evidence that the protesters had weapons, a prosecutor said in 2021. Mark McCloskey in July 2020 had told media that the "people in the crowd in front of my house" were "armed with guns" and that "the police were aware and have video" of that. He said, "We saw the weapons at the time," and accused one protester of showing loaded magazines and telling him: "You're next."

As a result of their newfound fame, the next month the couple were invited to speak at the 2020 Republican National Convention. In their remarks, which they delivered via video from their home, Mark McCloskey said, "It seems as if the Democrats no longer view the government's job as protecting honest citizens from criminals, but rather protecting criminals from honest citizens."

The couple pleaded their felonies down to misdemeanors and were fined a combined $3,000. Republican Missouri Governor Mike Parson subsequently issued pardons for the pair.

In February 2022, the Missouri Supreme Court suspended McCloskey's law license indefinitely but stayed that suspension and imposed one year of probation. On June 6, the United States Supreme Court declined to hear McCloskey's appeal.

In December 2023, the Missouri Court of Appeals Eastern District ruled that McCloskey is not entitled to the return of the firearms seized by law enforcement, despite the pardon. McCloskey intends to appeal that decision to the Missouri Supreme Court.

In January 2024, the McCloskeys filed a request to have their convictions expunged. City prosecutors and police opposed the expungements, but Missouri Circuit Court Judge Joseph P. Whyte granted their request in a June 5 order in which he wrote that expungements are meant to give a second chance to people who have rehabilitated themselves. Immediately after, the McCloskeys said the city should return their guns, threatening to sue if the city balked.

== Political activities ==
McCloskey has donated to both Republican and Democratic candidates. He gave $500 to former Sen. Claire McCaskill, who defeated Todd Akin in 2012. He gave $1,000 to Republican Bill Phelps, who was defeated by incumbent Democratic congressman Ike Skelton in 1992.

=== Campaign for U.S. Senate ===
In 2020, McCloskey launched a campaign for the U.S. Senate seat being vacated by Roy Blunt.

At a candidate's forum in Osage Beach, Missouri, in October 2021, McCloskey stated that he believes rape and incest victims as young as 13 years old should be prohibited from obtaining abortions. He said he once represented a woman who was raped by an uncle at 13, had the child, and later obtained a master's degree; and that the child who would have been aborted ended up getting a master's degree as well. McCloskey said that it had bothered him "as long ago as when I was in grade school" that some death penalty opponents also support abortion rights. He added, "The justices of the Supreme Court in the most heinous crimes don't have the right to decide who should live and die, but every 13-year-old girl on the street should be able to decide the fate of the life of their child?"

On August 2, 2022, McCloskey lost the Republican primary to Eric Schmitt.

=== Missouri Republican party ===
McCloskey advocates for vetting candidates and represents Cyndia Haggard in a legal battle in Vernon County over candidate eligibility. Haggard and her organization, Republican Association of Central Committees, advocate for a central committee vetting process for candidates to run as Republican involving a morals survey and scrutiny of background reports. Concern was raised over Christian Identity influence of the Vernon County slate of candidates, with controversial pastor Dan Gayman and other Church of Israel members serving on the vetting committee.

=== January 6 ===
McCloskey has pushed for those prosecuted for their involvement in the January 6 United States Capitol attack to receive compensation.
