= St. Louis gun-toting incident =

2020 incident in Missouri, United States

- Part of the George Floyd protests in Missouri, protests against Lyda Krewson, and the gun rights movement in the United States
- Mark and Patricia McCloskey standing outside of their St. Louis home armed with guns on June 28, 2020
- Date: June 28, 2020
- Location: St. Louis, Missouri, U.S.
- Caused by: Protesters entering a private community

On June 28, 2020, during the George Floyd protests in St. Louis, Missouri, Patricia and Mark McCloskey pointed firearms and yelled at protesters marching through the private neighborhood they co-owned. Some protesters yelled back. The incident gained national news coverage and sparked controversy.

St. Louis circuit attorney Kimberly Gardner filed charges against the McCloskey couple on July 20, 2020. This decision drew national attention. On June 17, 2021, the McCloskeys pled guilty to misdemeanor offenses: Mark for fourth-degree assault, and Patricia for harassment. Mark was required to pay a $750 fine, and Patricia $2,000.

In August 2021, they were both pardoned by Missouri governor Mike Parson. In February 2022, the Supreme Court of Missouri suspended the couple's law licenses indefinitely, but stayed the punishment and imposed one year of probation.

In 2024, a Missouri appeals court judge granted their request to have their criminal records expunged.

== Incident ==
On June 28, 2020, about 500 Black Lives Matter protestors entered Portland Place, a private gated neighborhood, in an attempt to walk to the home of St. Louis mayor Lyda Krewson on an adjacent neighborhood street. The crowd aimed to demonstrate against Mayor Krewson and demand her resignation after she publicly read names and both partial and full addresses of those who had submitted letters calling to defund the St. Louis Metropolitan Police Department.

Livestreamed video showed the first protesters entering the community by walking through an intact gate that a man was holding open; twenty seconds later, the video shows Mark McCloskey with a rifle outside his house, yelling at protesters. McCloskey later told media that the protesters "smashed through the historic wrought iron gates of Portland Place, destroying them, rushed towards my home...put us in fear for our lives", and also that "the gate came down and a large crowd of angry, aggressive people poured through. I was terrified that we'd be murdered within seconds". While the gate was damaged at some point in time, it was unclear who had damaged it.

As the crowd approached, McCloskey shouted "private property" and "get out" multiple times at protesters. Protesters marched past his home; others marched closer to his home. Mark and Patricia stood outside their front door with a Colt AR-15 and Bryco pistol respectively. Several protesters confronted Mark and Patricia in front of their home, only several yards apart, exchanging heated words. At one point, Patricia walked onto the grass between her home and the sidewalk where protesters were marching by. Some protesters were heard asking others to leave and move on, while other protesters were heard shouting at the McCloskeys. During this time, Mark and Patricia pointed their guns towards the crowd. No shots were fired and there were no injuries. Shortly after the incident, the McCloskeys claimed that they support the Black Lives Matter movement and civil rights. They later criticized BLM protesters at the 2020 Republican National Convention.

There was no evidence that the protesters involved in this incident had weapons, a prosecutor claimed in 2021. Mark McCloskey in July 2020 had told media that the "people in the crowd in front of my house" were "armed with guns" and that "the police were aware and have video" of that. McCloskey said, "We saw the weapons at the time", and accused one protester of showing loaded magazines and telling him: "You're next."

== Police investigations ==
On June 29, 2020, police were investigating protesters for trespassing and assault by intimidation. President Donald Trump also retweeted video of the incident. Kimberly Gardner, the circuit attorney (chief prosecutor) for the City of St. Louis, Missouri, told CNN in a statement, "We must protect the right to peacefully protest, and any attempt to chill it through intimidation or threat of deadly force will not be tolerated." These protesters were related to the George Floyd protests in Missouri.

On July 10, 2020, St. Louis police seized Mark McCloskey's rifle. The McCloskeys' previous attorney, Al Watkins, was in possession of the handgun which had been held by Patricia McCloskey, claiming it was to ensure that the handgun was not tampered with. Watkins claimed that the handgun was not functional and could not be fired, and that Patricia knew it was not functional when she held it during the confrontation with the protestors. Watkins then turned over the handgun to the authorities. The handgun had been nonfunctional because it was used as evidence in a previous unrelated trial.

On September 30, 2020, St. Louis City officials announced the decision to not pursue the trespassing charges against the protesters.

== Prosecution of the McCloskeys ==
On July 20, 2020, St. Louis Circuit Attorney Kimberly Gardner filed charges against Mark and Patricia McCloskey for unlawful use of a weapon, a class E felony which can carry a sentence of up to four years in prison and a fine of $10,000. This decision drew national attention and criticism from Republican politicians.

On July 21, 2020, Missouri Attorney General Eric Schmitt filed amicus briefs which argue "Missouri's statutes specifically authorize Missouri citizens to use firearms to deter assailants and protect themselves, their families, and homes from threatening or violent intruders" and request dismissal of the cases against the McCloskeys. Schmitt expressed his concern for "the chilling effect that this [case] might have with people exercising their Second Amendment rights". Retired Missouri Supreme Court Chief Justice Mike Wolff was critical of the intervention, stating that Schmitt "had no role at the trial court level and might be called on to represent prosecutors if the McCloskeys are convicted and appeal".

On July 22, 2020, KMOV reported they had anonymously received a prosecutor's ballistics report, which said the lab had tested both the rifle and the handgun. The rifle fired when tested, but the handgun was not functional and could not be fired. At the request of prosecutor Chris Hinkley, the handgun was stripped and found to be assembled incorrectly. The prosecutor then requested it to be reassembled correctly and test fired again. The handgun then fired properly. The prosecutor's charging documents stated that the handgun was capable of lethal use. The McCloskeys' later attorney, Joel Schwartz, argued if the lab report was authentic, then this action could be considered tampering with evidence, and if the handgun was truly inoperable at the time of the confrontation with protesters, then the prosecutor's charges against Patricia McCloskey should be invalid because the handgun was not readily capable of lethal use.

On July 29, 2020, Schwartz filed a motion to disqualify Gardner and her office from pursuing the case, arguing that she was not neutral. Gardner had sent out campaign literature and fundraising emails in the Democratic primaries referencing the charges against the McCloskeys before any charges were brought against them.

On July 30, 2020, KSDK reported that the lead St. Louis police detective investigating the McCloskey case had refused to sign at least two versions of court documents which were drafted by the prosecutors, showing that police had reviewed videos taken June 28 during the incident and had contended that at least one protester in the crowd was armed and another was wearing a bullet-resistant vest.

On October 6, 2020, a grand jury indicted both of the McCloskeys for exhibiting guns at a protest and tampering with a weapon. Missouri governor Mike Parson said he would "certainly" pardon the McCloskeys if they were convicted.

On December 11, 2020, Circuit Judge Thomas Clark II disqualified circuit attorney Gardner from prosecuting the case against Mark McCloskey, ruling that the circulating of fundraising emails alluding to the McCloskey case "raises the appearance that she initiated a criminal prosecution for political purposes."

On February 24, 2021, U.S. attorney Richard G. Callahan was appointed as a special prosecutor to the case.

On June 17, 2021, the McCloskeys pleaded guilty to misdemeanor offenses, with Mark being charged with fourth-degree assault and Patricia being charged with second-degree harassment. Mark averred that, with all other charges dropped, he had, indeed, "instilled fear" in the mob, as charged, and that any time they come to threaten him he will do the same thing 'again, and again, and again.'

On August 3, 2021, Parson pardoned the McCloskeys.

== Reaction ==
A photograph of the couple taken by United Press International photographer Bill Greenblatt received considerable attention, and quickly became an internet meme. The McCloskeys themselves began using the image as a greeting card, but also sued Greenblatt; with the couple stating that Greenblatt's photo gave them "infamy" and "humiliation", demanding that ownership of the photo should be transferred to them. Historian Walter Johnson described the image as iconic and stated that it "is likely to be as emblematic of our era as Anthony van Dyck's 1632 Portrait of Anthony van Opstal (which hangs in the McCloskeys' house) is of the Flemish Baroque."

Mark McCloskey and his attorney, Albert Watkins, appeared on Fox's Tucker Carlson Tonight on June 30, 2020, two days after the incident.

On July 14, President Trump gave an interview with conservative news outlet Townhall, in which he stated support for the McCloskeys.

On July 20, following the filing of charges against the couple, White House Press Secretary Kayleigh McEnany called those charges an "egregious abuse of power."

== Aftermath ==
On August 24, the couple delivered remarks during the 2020 Republican National Convention in support of the 2nd Amendment and of Trump, while criticizing Black Lives Matter protesters.

In response to the speech, the rabbi of the synagogue abutting the McCloskey property, Susan Talve, recounted a 2013 incident when Mark McCloskey destroyed a wooden structure housing the synagogue's beehive. The hive had been on a slice of McCloskey's property that sat outside the brick wall that surrounds the gated Portland Place and that abutted the synagogue grounds. Snopes rates this claim unproven.

In April 2021, Mark McCloskey said in a brief interview with Politico that he was considering entering the 2022 U.S. Senate election as a Republican. On May 18, he announced his bid. Incumbent Republican senator Roy Blunt had announced in March 2021 that he would not be running for reelection. McCloskey received 3 percent of the vote in the Republican primary.

In September 2021, Missouri's chief disciplinary counsel asked the Supreme Court of Missouri to suspend their law licenses. The court imposed an indefinite suspension in February 2022, but immediately stayed it subject to a one-year probation period.

McCloskey appealed the suspension to the United States Supreme Court, which declined to hear the case on June 6, 2022.

In 2024, the McCloskeys filed a petition to have their criminal records expunged. A state judge granted their request on June 5, 2024, restoring the rights they had lost as criminals, including the right to recover the weapons brandished in the 2020 incident. State prosecutors objected, and the appeal was heard by the Missouri Court of Appeals, which found for the McCloskeys on July 1, 2025. On July 31, 2025, the St. Louis Police Department agreed to return Mark McCloskey's AR-15 rifle. The following day, McCloskey posted on social media that he had regained his rifle.
