= Schedule of the 2020 Democratic National Convention =

The 2020 Democratic National Convention (conducted virtually due to the impacts of the COVID-19 pandemic), was held August 17–20, 2020. Each night of the convention was scheduled to last two hours. In addition to the convention's overall official theme of "Uniting America", each night had an official sub-theme of its own.

== Daytime events ==
Caucus meetings and other events were streamed on various platforms earlier on the days of the convention. Virtual policy roundtables were hosted in partnership with Business Forward. Many partner organization events were planned to be held, including a Protect Our Care health care panel with Nancy Pelosi, Xavier Becerra, Kathleen Sebelius, and three of the five health care activists featured in a conversation with Joe Biden on Night 2 of the convention.

Before the convention opened, an Interfaith Welcome Service was held virtually on August 16, a partner event to the DNC.

== Monday (August 17) evening program ==
Democratic National Convention Pool Feeds
- Night 1
- from MSNBC via YouTube
- from C-SPAN via YouTube
- from PBS NewsHour via YouTube
- from Politico via YouTube

Democratic National Convention Democratic Party Streams
- Night 1
- Official convention stream via YouTube
- Official ASL convention stream via YouTube
- Official spanish-language convention stream via YouTube

9:00–11:00 p.m. EDT

Emcee: Eva Longoria

Theme
"We the People"

Sub-themes

- "We the People Demanding Racial Justice"
- "We the People Helping Each Other Through COVID-19"
- "We the People Putting Country Over Party"
- "We the People Recovering"
- "We the People Rise"

Evening schedule

- Opening ceremonies
  - Introduction by actress Eva Longoria
  - Call to Order by convention chair Bennie Thompson
  - Pledge of Allegiance
  - Performance of the United States national anthem ("The Star-Spangled Banner")
  - Invocation by Gabriel Salguero
- Main convention program
- Benediction by Jerry Young
- Nightly close of order by convention chair Bennie Thompson

Select speakers (in order of appearance)

Speakers for 1st evening (Monday) of 2020 convention
Speaker	Position/notability	Location	Notes	Cite
Eva Longoria	Actress and activist	Los Angeles, California	Emcee	
Bennie Thompson	United States representative from Mississippi and permanent chairman of the convention	Jackson, Mississippi	Call to Order and Close of Order	
Gwen Moore	United States representative from Wisconsin	Wisconsin Center in Milwaukee, Wisconsin		
Muriel Bowser	Mayor of the District of Columbia	Black Lives Matter Plaza in Washington, D.C.		
Jim Clyburn	United States representative from South Carolina and House majority whip	Charleston, South Carolina		
Andrew Cuomo	Governor of New York	Albany, New York		
Kristin Urquiza		San Francisco, California		
Sara Gideon	Speaker of the Maine House of Representatives and U.S. Senate nominee from Maine	Scarborough, Maine	Introduction to performance by Maggie Rogers	
Gretchen Whitmer	Governor of Michigan	UAW Local 603 in Lansing, Michigan		
Christine Todd Whitman	Former administrator of the Environmental Protection Agency and governor of New Jersey (Republican)	New York, New York		
Meg Whitman	Former CEO of Hewlett-Packard and Republican nominee for Governor of California in 2010	Sacramento, California		
Susan Molinari	Former United States representative from New York (Republican)	Sarasota, Florida		
John Kasich	Former governor of Ohio (Republican); candidate for the 2000 and 2016 Republican presidential nominations	Westerville, Ohio		
Doug Jones	United States senator from Alabama	Birmingham, Alabama		
Catherine Cortez Masto	United States senator from Nevada; Chair of the Democratic Senatorial Campaign Committee	Las Vegas, Nevada		
Amy Klobuchar	United States senator from Minnesota; candidate for the 2020 Democratic presidential nomination	Saint Paul, Minnesota		
Cedric Richmond	United States representative from Louisiana	New Orleans, Louisiana		
Bernie Sanders	United States senator from Vermont; candidate for the 2016 and 2020 Democratic presidential nomination	Burlington, Vermont		
Michelle Obama	Former first lady of the United States	Personal residence in Martha's Vineyard, Massachusetts		

Performances (in order of appearance)

- Leon Bridges performing "Sweetness"
- Maggie Rogers performing "Back In My Body"
- Billy Porter and Stephen Stills performing "For What It's Worth"

Selected film segments

- "The Path Forward": A Conversation with Vice President Biden on Racial Justice (featuring Joe Biden, Houston police chief Art Acevedo, activist Jamira Burley, activist Gwen Carr, NAACP president Derrick Johnson, and Chicago mayor Lori Lightfoot)
- A Conversation with Healthcare Workers on the Front Lines (moderated by United States women's national soccer team member Megan Rapinoe)
- "United We Stand" (featuring Kamala Harris and former 2020 Democratic presidential candidates United States senator Cory Booker, United States senator Kirsten Gillibrand, Governor of Washington Jay Inslee, United States senator Amy Klobuchar, United States representative Seth Moulton, former United States representative Beto O'Rourke, businessman Tom Steyer, and businessman Andrew Yang)

== Tuesday (August 18) evening program ==
Democratic National Convention Pool Feeds
- Night 2
- from C-SPAN via YouTube
- from MSNBC via YouTube
- from PBS NewsHour via YouTube
- from Politico via YouTube

Democratic National Convention Democratic Party Streams
- Night 2
- Official convention stream via YouTube
- Official ASL convention stream via YouTube
- Official spanish-language convention stream via YouTube

The second night of the convention included official business, such as the nominating roll call for president.

9:00–11:00 p.m. EDT

Emcee: Tracee Ellis Ross

Theme
"Leadership Matters"

Evening schedule

- Call to order by Mayor of Milwaukee Tom Barrett
- Credentials Committee Report
  - James H. Roosevelt
  - Lorraine Miller
- Rules Committee Report
  - Barney Frank
  - Maria Cardona
- Platform Committee Report
  - Julie Chavez Rodriguez
  - Denis McDonough
- Keynote address
- Main convention program (part 1)
- Nominations and roll call
- Main convention program (part 2)

Select speakers (in order of appearance)

Speakers for 2nd evening (Tuesday) of 2020 convention
Speaker	Position/notability	Location	Notes	Cite
Tom Barrett	Mayor of Milwaukee	Wisconsin Center in Milwaukee, Wisconsin	Call to order	
The keynote address featured seventeen of the Democratic Party's "rising stars" from across the country. The speakers were former minority leader of the Georgia House of Representatives Stacey Abrams; Tennessee state senator Raumesh Akbari; United States representative Colin Allred of Texas; United States representative Brendan Boyle of Pennsylvania; Nevada state senator Yvanna Cancela; former Ohio state representative Kathleen Clyde; Florida commissioner of agriculture Nikki Fried; Mayor of Long Beach, California Robert Garcia; Pennsylvania state representative Malcolm Kenyatta; South Carolina state senator Marlon Kimpson; United States representative Conor Lamb of Pennsylvania, Michigan state representative Mari Manoogian; Texas state representative Victoria Neave; president of the Navajo Nation Jonathan Nez; Georgia state representative Sam Park; New Hampshire state representative Dennis Ruprecht; mayor of Birmingham, Alabama, Randall Woodfin			Keynote address	
Tracee Ellis Ross	Actress	Los Angeles, California	Emcee	
Sally Yates	Former acting United States attorney general	Atlanta, Georgia		
Chuck Schumer	United States Senate minority leader	Brooklyn, New York		
Caroline Kennedy	Former ambassador to Japan and the daughter of former president John F. Kennedy		Joint remarks	
Jack Schlossberg	Grandson of John F. Kennedy		Joint remarks	
Jimmy Carter	Former president of the United States		Joint remarks (voice only, no video appearance)	
Rosalynn Carter	Former first lady of the United States		Joint remarks (voice only, no video appearance)	
Bill Clinton	Former president of the United States	Chappaqua, New York		
Tom Perez	Chairman of the Democratic National Committee	Wisconsin Center in Milwaukee, Wisconsin		
Bob King	Former president of the United Auto Workers	Ann Arbor, Michigan	Nominating speech for Bernie Sanders	
Alexandria Ocasio-Cortez	United States representative from New York	Washington, D.C.	Seconding speech for Bernie Sanders	
Jacquelyn Asbie	Security guard	New York City	Nominating speech for Joe Biden	
Chris Coons	United States senator from Delaware	Wilmington, Delaware	Seconding speech for Joe Biden	
Lisa Blunt Rochester	United States representative from Delaware	Wilmington, Delaware	Seconding speech for Joe Biden	
Ady Barkan	Activist			
John Kerry	Former secretary of state and the party's 2004 presidential nominee	Boston, Massachusetts		
Colin Powell	Former United States secretary of state (Republican)	Washington, D.C.		
Jill Biden	former second lady of the United States	Brandywine High School in Wilmington, Delaware	speech by spouse of the presidential nominee	

Select film segments

- The Biden Plan: Healthcare (narrated by Jeff Bridges)
- A More Perfect Union: A Conversation on Healthcare (featuring Joe Biden, and health care activists Julie Buckholt, Steve Gomez, Jeff Jeans, Laura Packard, Angie Taylor)
- The Biden Plan: National Security
- An Unlikely Friendship (narrated in part by Cindy McCain, widow of the late Senator John McCain from Arizona)
- Teacher

Performances

- John Legend

== Wednesday (August 19) evening program ==
Democratic National Convention Pool Feeds
- Night 3

Democratic National Convention Democratic Party Streams
- Night 3
- Official convention stream via YouTube
- Official ASL convention stream via YouTube
- Official spanish-language convention stream via YouTube

9:00–11:00 p.m. EDT

Emcee: Kerry Washington

Theme
"A More Perfect Union"

Sub-themes

- A More Perfect Society
- A More Perfect Economy

Evening schedule

- Prior to the evening program, the Democratic Governors Association hosted the panel "Bold Leadership: Women Governors Leading", which featured Oregon governor Kate Brown, Kansas governor Laura Kelly, New Mexico governor Michelle Lujan Grisham, Maine governor Janet Mills and Michigan governor Gretchen Whitmer, and was moderated by Rhode Island governor Gina Raimondo.
- Introduction
- Call to Order by convention chair Bennie Thompson
- Pledge of Allegiance
- Main convention program
- Vice-presidential nomination
- Vice-presidential acceptance speech

Select speakers (in order of appearance)

Speakers for 3rd evening (Wednesday) of 2020 convention
Speaker	Position/notability	Location	Notes	Cite
Tony Evers	Governor of Wisconsin	Wisconsin Center in Milwaukee, Wisconsin		
Kamala Harris	Democratic nominee for vice president of the United States, United States senator from California	Chase Center on the Riverfront in Wilmington, Delaware	Welcoming remarks	
Kerry Washington	Actress	Los Angeles, California	Emcee	
Gabrielle Giffords	Former United States representative from Arizona and a prominent gun control advocate			
Michelle Lujan Grisham	Governor of New Mexico	Albuquerque, New Mexico		
Hillary Clinton	Former first lady of the United States, former United States senator from New York, former United States secretary of state and the party's 2016 presidential nominee	Chappaqua, New York		
Nancy Pelosi	Speaker of the United States House of Representatives	San Francisco, California		
Mariska Hargitay	Actress and philanthropist	New York City, New York		
Hilda Solis	Member of the Los Angeles County Board of Supervisors and former United States secretary of labor	Los Angeles, California		
Elizabeth Warren	United States senator from Massachusetts; candidate for the 2020 Democratic presidential nomination	Springfield, Massachusetts		
Barack Obama	Former president of the United States	Museum of the American Revolution in Philadelphia, Pennsylvania		
Maya Harris	Younger sister of the vice presidential nominee		Nominating speech for Kamala Harris	
Meena Harris	Niece of the vice presidential nominee		Nominating speech for Kamala Harris	
Ella Emhoff	Stepdaughter of the vice presidential nominee		Nominating speech for Kamala Harris	
Kamala Harris	Democratic nominee for vice president of the United States, United States senator from California	Chase Center on the Riverfront in Wilmington, Delaware	Vice-presidential nomination acceptance speech	

Select film segments

- America Rising: March for Our Lives (featuring X González)
- The Biden Plan: Climate Change
- A Conversation with Young Climate Activists
- A Letter to Trump on Immigration
- America Rising: Immigrants Rebuilding America
- America Rising: From Women's Suffrage to the Women's March
- When You See Something Wrong
- America Recovering (featuring United States senator from Ohio Sherrod Brown, Mayor of Los Angeles Eric Garcetti, and United States congresswoman from Iowa Cindy Axne)

Performances

- Billie Eilish performing "My Future"
- Prince Royce performing "Stand by Me"
- Jennifer Hudson performing "A Change Is Gonna Come"

== Thursday (August 20) evening program ==
Democratic National Convention Pool Feeds
- Night 4
- from C-SPAN via YouTube

Democratic National Convention Democratic Party Streams
- Night 4
- Official convention stream via YouTube
- Official ASL convention stream via YouTube
- Official spanish-language convention stream via YouTube

9:00–11:00 p.m. EDT

Emcee: Julia Louis-Dreyfus

Theme
"America's Promise"

Evening schedule

- Call to Order by convention chair Bennie Thompson
- Remarks by Andrew Yang
- Introduction by Julia Louis-Dreyfus
- Pledge of Allegiance
- National anthem ("The Star-Spangled Banner") performed by The Chicks
- Invocation by Sister Simone Campbell
- Main convention program
- Presidential acceptance speech
- Fireworks display
- Benediction
- Adjournment by convention chair Bennie Thompson

Select speakers (in order of appearance)

Speakers for 4th evening (Thursday) of 2020 convention
Speaker	Position/notability	Location	Notes	Cite
Tom Perez	Chairman of the Democratic National Committee	Wisconsin Center in Milwaukee, Wisconsin		
Gavin Newsom	Governor of California	Santa Cruz County, California		
Andrew Yang	Entrepreneur; Founder of Venture for America; candidate for the 2020 Democratic presidential nomination	New York City, New York		
Julia Louis-Dreyfus	Actress	Los Angeles, California	Emcee	
Chris Coons	United States senator from Delaware	Wilmington, Delaware		
Keisha Lance Bottoms	Mayor of Atlanta	Atlanta, Georgia		
Jon Meacham	Author	Nashville, Tennessee		
Deb Haaland	United States representative from New Mexico	Albuquerque, New Mexico		
Sarah Cooper	Author and comedian			
Alex Padilla	California secretary of state		Joint remarks	
Jocelyn Benson	Michigan secretary of state		Joint remarks	
Cory Booker	United States senator from New Jersey; candidate for the 2020 Democratic presidential nomination	New York City, New York		
Vivek Murthy	Former Surgeon General of the United States	Miami, Florida		
Tammy Baldwin	United States senator from Wisconsin	Wisconsin Center in Milwaukee, Wisconsin		
Tammy Duckworth	United States senator from Illinois	Washington, D.C.		
Pete Buttigieg	Former mayor of South Bend, Indiana; candidate for the 2020 Democratic presidential nomination	South Bend, Indiana		
Michael Bloomberg	Former mayor of New York City; candidate for the 2020 Democratic presidential nomination	Colorado		
Brayden Harrington				
Ashley Biden	Daughter of the presidential nominee			
Hunter Biden	Son of the presidential nominee			
Joe Biden	Nominee for president of the United States, former vice president of the United States	Chase Center on the Riverfront in Wilmington, Delaware	Presidential nomination acceptance speech	

Select film segments

- A Tribute to John Lewis (directed by Dawn Porter; featuring former minority leader of the Georgia House of Representatives Stacey Abrams; deceased former United States representative Elijah Cummings; United States Speaker of the House Nancy Pelosi; Reverend Raphael Warnock, former ambassador Andrew Young)
- "You Built America": A Conversation on the Economy with Vice President Biden
- The Biden Plan: Military Families (featuring Jill Biden)
- A Tribute to Beau Biden
- This Time Next Year (featuring activist Ady Barkan; Nevada senator Yvanna Cancela; Lieutenant Governor of Minnesota Peggy Flanagan; United States representative Marcia Fudge; Mayor of Long Beach, California, Robert Garcia; activist Fred Guttenberg; United States senator Kamala Harris; United States Senate candidate Jaime Harrison; Harris County, Texas, judge Lina Hidalgo; activist Dolores Huerta; convicted murderer Donna Hylton; United States senator Doug Jones; lawyer Khizr Khan; actor Daniel Dae Kim; United States senator Amy Klobuchar; author Jon Meacham; former United States representative Susan Molinari; former United States secretary of state Colin Powell; United States representative Beto O'Rourke; Virginia state delegate Danica Roem; lawyer James H. Roosevelt; General Francis D. Vavala; United States senator Elizabeth Warren; businessman Andrew Yang)
- United We Stand (featuring former 2020 Democratic presidential candidates United States senator Cory Booker, former mayor of South Bend Pete Buttigieg, United States senator Amy Klobuchar, former United States representative Beto O'Rourke, United States senator Bernie Sanders, United States senator Elizabeth Warren, and businessman Andrew Yang)
- The Biden Grandchildren
- Keeping the Faith w/ The Currys (featuring Stephen Curry and his family)
- Biden Introduction

Select performances

- The Chicks performing "The Star-Spangled Banner"
- John Legend and Common performing "Glory"

== See also ==
- Logistics of the 2020 Democratic National Convention
