= George Floyd protests in Missouri =

2020 civil unrest after the murder of George Floyd

- Part of George Floyd protests
- Date: May 29, 2020 – June 28, 2020 (4 weeks and 2 days)
- Location: Missouri, United States
- Caused by: Police brutality; Institutional racism against African Americans; Reaction to the murder of George Floyd; Economic, racial and social inequality

Casualties
- Deaths: 2

Cities in Missouri in which a protest with about 100 or more participants was held

This is a list of George Floyd protests in the U.S. state of Missouri.

== Locations ==
=== Cape Girardeau ===
On May 31, over 100 protesters came to Freedom Corner to protest for Black Lives Matter.

=== Columbia ===
On June 1 a small group of people smashed windows of a business. Over the course of the protests multiple people were struck by cars sending at least one to the hospital. At times, protesters moved into the intersection and surrounded cars. KBIA reporters noted that bricks and rocks were thrown into the street in an effort to disrupt the flow of traffic. On June 7, around 2,000 protesters marched from the Boone County Courthouse in support of Black Lives Matter and George Floyd.

=== Independence ===
One June 7, over 300 people marched from the United Nations Peace Plaza to the Harry S. Truman Courthouse to protest the murder of George Floyd. At the courthouse, the protesters held a moment of silence for eight minutes and forty-six seconds.

=== Jefferson City ===
On June 1, an estimated 2,000 people went to the Missouri State Capitol to protest the murder of George Floyd. At one point members of the protest threw water bottles at Jefferson City police officers. A few businesses had their windows broken as well.

=== Joplin ===
On May 30, dozens of protesters gathered at 7th and Range Line Road to protest the murder of George Floyd. The protests continued for at least two more days.

=== Kansas City ===
Hundreds of protesters marched from the Country Club Plaza to Westport the evening of May 29, where police used pepper spray. Some protesters sat in the middle of the street, closing several streets near the intersection of J.C. Nichols Parkway and Emmanuel Cleaver II Boulevard for hours. Some protesters blocked a window and picked up a type 3 traffic barricade, drawing the attention of police officers. On May 30, protesters broke glass windows and vandalized the Country Club Plaza business including, Foot Locker, Victoria's Secret, H&M, The North Face, Cafe Trio, Season's 52, P.F. Chang's and other locations. That same night, five protesters set a police car on fire. On June 1, 2020, protests grew more violent as protesters threw rocks and water bottles in retaliation to officers attacking protesters with batons leading to many injuries. By June 4, there had been more than 230 arrests at the protest. All non-violent charges were later dropped as a result of a city council ordinance.

An activist who was arrested after stepping off a sidewalk is suing the officers who used pepper spray on him and his daughter for excessive force. The officer involved was later charged with misdemeanor assault for spraying pepper spray in the teen's face.

=== Kirksville ===
On June 2, several hundred demonstrators lined Baltimore Street with signs displaying support for the Black Lives Movement and Policing Reform. The demonstration was organized by area white high school students who made clear to refer to the demonstration as "peaceful" as there were no marches, chants, or blockades planned or encouraged. This organizers of this event partnered with the local police department in planning.

On September 29 that same year, a group of mostly Black and Hispanic students from Truman State University organized a march and vigil for Breonna Taylor and other victims of police brutality. Unlike the demonstration in May, this event was not shared with or pre-approved by the local police department. Hundreds of students, staff, and professors marched through the town center walking north up Franklin street and made their way to the Kirksville Police Department. Once there, the protesters maintained 9 minutes of silence in memory of George Floyd. Later that evening, students delivered speeches honoring victims of police brutality, criticizing American criminal justice, and personal recollections of injustice.

=== O'Fallon ===
On June 1, between 1,500 and 2,000 protesters marched through the streets, arm in arm with police officers, to the City of O'Fallon Justice Center to support Black Lives Matter and George Floyd.

=== Rolla ===
On June 7, hundreds of protesters marched through downtown in support of Black Lives Matter. Protesters knelt in silence outside the Rolla Police Station for nine minutes and then read out the names of black victims of police violence and lynchings.

=== Springfield ===
On May 30 and 31, hundreds of protesters marched down Battlefield Road, carrying signs with messages protesting racial injustice. At the intersection of Glenstone and Battlefield, a group lay down on the road for several minutes screaming "I can’t breathe!" At least two protesters said they felt supported on Sunday by the Springfield police. One protester was arrested on Sunday by the police at his request to create awareness, but was later released.

=== St. Charles ===
On June 3, hundred of protesters walked along First Capitol Drive and on Route 94 in support of George Floyd. Mayor Dan Borgmeyer attended the rally and spoke in support of the protesters.

=== St. Louis ===
On May 30, around 1,500 protesters marched downtown. Rioters shut down part of Interstate 64 and Interstate 70, some setting off fireworks. Protesters also blocked traffic in the downtown. One protester died after being dragged by a FedEx truck in the early morning hours of May 30 as it tried to slowly drive through North Broadway and O'Fallon Street. On the night of Monday, June 1, four St. Louis police officers were shot during protests. A spokeswoman for the department said the officers were "conscious and breathing" and their "injuries are believed to be non-life threatening." On the same night David Dorn, a 77-year-old retired St. Louis police captain, was shot and killed while he was trying protect a pawn shop from being looted. Four police officers were shot during violent protests just after midnight on Tuesday, June 2.

On June 28, 2020, approximately 500 protesters marched to Mayor Lyda Krewson's house after she read aloud the names and addresses of residents who had written letters suggesting she defund the police in a Facebook live stream. To reach Krewson's home, protesters took a shortcut through the Portland Place, by entering through a gate located directly next to the home of Mark and Patricia McCloskey. The McCloskeys were seen outside their home pointing guns at the protesters while exchanging hostile words.

== See also ==
- Operation Legend
