= Murder of David Dorn =

Murder of a 77-year-old African-American retired police chief

- Location: St. Louis, Missouri, U.S.
- Date: June 2, 2020; 6 years ago
- Attack type: Murder by shooting
- Victims: David Dorn, aged 77
- Perpetrator: Stephen Cannon
- Motive: Botched robbery
- Verdict: Guilty on all counts
- Convictions: First-degree murder; First-degree robbery; First-degree burglary; Armed criminal action (3 counts)
- Sentence: Life imprisonment without the possibility of parole

On June 2, 2020, David Dorn, a 77-year-old retired police captain, was fatally shot after interrupting the burglary of a pawn shop in The Ville, St. Louis. The incident took place during riots in St. Louis, Missouri following the murder of George Floyd. Stephan Cannon, who was 24 years old at the time of the incident, was convicted of his murder on July 20, 2022.

== Persons involved ==
=== Victim ===
David Dorn
- Born: October 29, 1942
- Died: June 2, 2020 (aged 77)
- Occupation: Police officer at St. Louis Metropolitan Police Department
- Known for: Murder of David Dorn
- Spouse: Ann Marie Dorn
- Children: 5

David Dorn (October 29, 1942 – June 2, 2020) was an African-American captain in the Metropolitan Police Department, City of St. Louis, working there from November 1969 to October 2007. He later served as police chief of Moline Acres from February 2008.

=== Shooter ===
The shooter, Stephan Cannon, a 24-year-old Black man from Glasgow Village, Missouri, was charged with first-degree murder, three counts of armed criminal action, robbery, burglary, stealing and unlawful possession of a weapon.

Another suspect, Jimmie Robinson, an African-American male, was charged with burglary, armed criminal action, and stealing. An additional suspect, Mark Jackson, an African-American male, was charged with second-degree murder, first-degree robbery, burglary, stealing, and armed criminal action.

== Incident ==
On June 2, 2020, Dorn was discovered on the sidewalk in front of Lee's Pawn and Jewelry in The Ville around 2:30 a.m. Despite a city-wide curfew, he had reportedly been responding to the burglar alarm of his friend's pawn shop when he was killed. His death was streamed on Facebook Live.

The thirteen-minute video was briefly taken down by Facebook before being reinstated with a warning screen. In the video, a young man states: "Oh my God, cuz....They just killed this old man at the pawn shop over some TVs....c'mon, man, that's somebody's granddaddy."

== Investigation ==
Crime Stoppers offered a $10,000 reward for information leading to an arrest; this amount was later raised to $56,700.

On June 5, St. Louis Metropolitan Police Department Homicide Section released surveillance footage to the public to provide clues and evidence in their investigation of David Dorn's death. The video captured a total of seven suspects trespassing at Lee's Pawn and Jewelry at 4123 Martin Luther King Drive. The footage was taken on June 2 from 2:13 a.m. to 2:16 a.m. All suspects in the video had their faces concealed. Six wore masks, and one had a white shirt wrapped around his face and head. At least two of the men were seen armed with handguns. One person pulled his handgun to target the entrance before joining the others. Another suspect had a cut on his left palm. The reward for additional information that could capture the criminals was raised another $6,000 since the surveillance video's release.

On June 7, a 24-year-old suspect named Stephan Cannon was charged with first-degree murder, robbery, and being a prohibited possessor of a firearm. Cannon's trial started on July 18, 2022. During the trial Cannon's co-defendant Mark Jackson testified against Cannon in a plea deal in which Cannon pleaded guilty to first-degree robbery and burglary which dropped Jackson's charges of second-degree murder, stealing and three counts of armed criminal action in exchange for Jackson's testimony that he drove Cannon to and from the pawn shop where Dorn was killed. Jackson was given a suspended 15-year prison sentence that includes five years probation.

On July 20, Cannon was found guilty of first degree murder, first degree burglary, and three counts of armed criminal action. He was sentenced to life in prison without parole on October 5.

== Aftermath ==
A small memorial was quickly set up outside the shop, with a handwritten sign stating; "Y'all killed a black man because 'they' killed a black man??? Rest in peace." St. Louis Police Chief John Hayden Jr. ordered all the department's officers to wear black mourning bands on their police badges to honor Dorn.

Several GoFundMe fundraisers quickly sprang up online, although none of them were endorsed by family members. A Fundly account has been endorsed by the family and they have asked for support of organizations such as CrimeStoppers or BackStoppers.

Dorn's widow, Ann Dorn, spoke in favor of Donald Trump at the 2020 Republican National Convention. She spoke about her husband's death, over the objections of their daughters who stated that he was opposed to Donald Trump.

== Reactions ==
His widow, Ann Marie Dorn, told reporters that her husband was a friend of the owner of the store and would routinely check on the business when the alarm would go off.

The former St. Louis County Police Chief Tim Finch called Dorn a "true public servant".

Missouri Governor Mike Parson related the shooting of Dorn with the murder of George Floyd, tweeting that neither should have died, and that violence and criminal activity that had nothing to do with protests against Floyd's murder needed to stop.

The Ethical Society of the Police, an organization which supports black police officers in the United States, tweeted "(Dorn) was murdered by looters at a pawnshop. He was the type of brother that would've given his life to save them if he had to. Violence is not the answer, whether it's a citizen or officer. RIP Captain!"
