= United Nations Peace Plaza =

Independence, Missouri "Girl with Dove" statue

Coordinates: 39°5′26.5″N 94°25′44.3″W

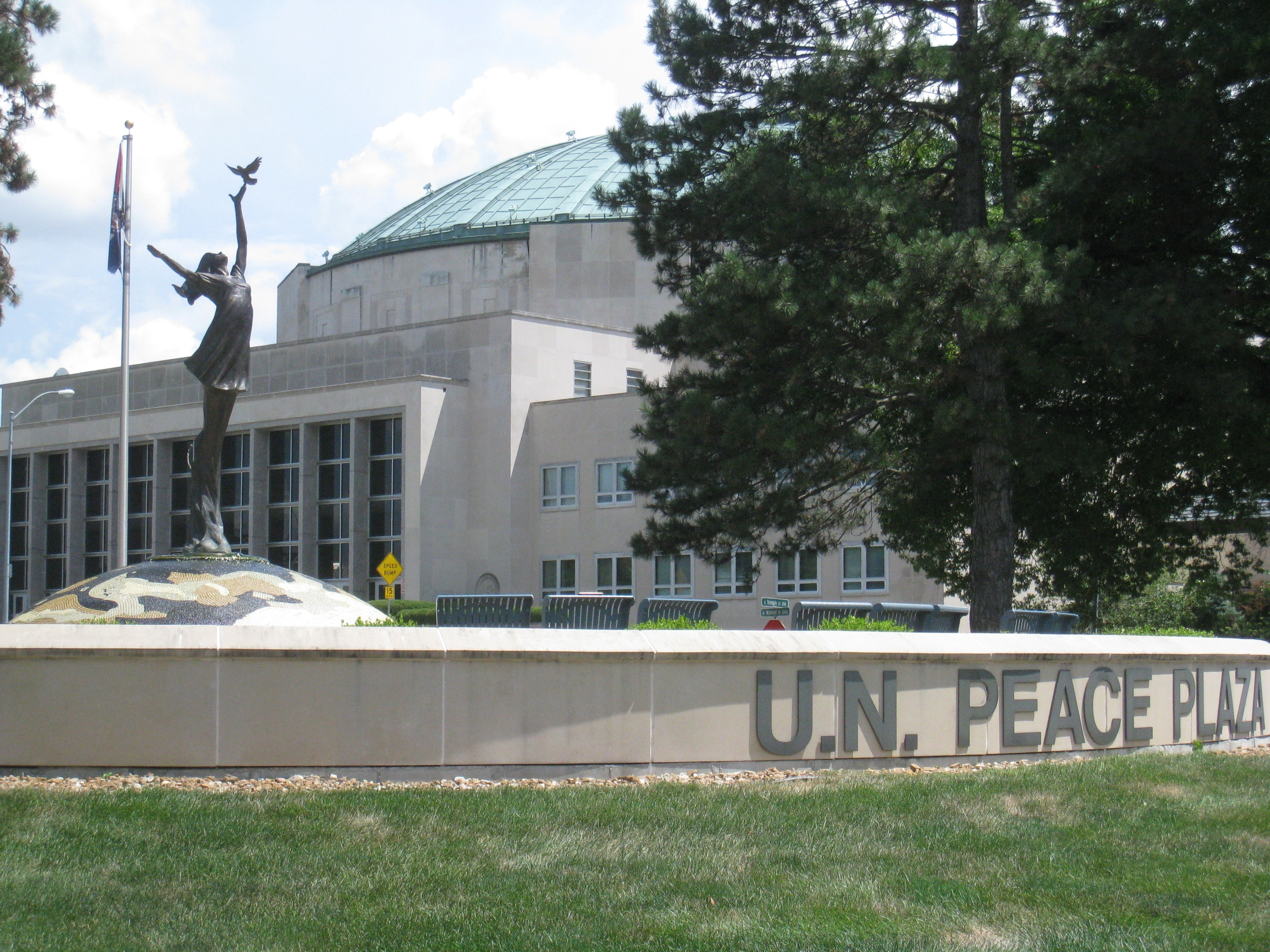
The United Nations Peace Plaza in Independence, Missouri, with the RLDS/Community of Christ Auditorium in the background. Upon signing the United Nations Charter in San Francisco, California on June 26, 1945, President Harry Truman arrived in Independence, Missouri the next day, and addressed a crowd of about 10,000 in the RLDS Auditorium.

The United Nations Peace Plaza in Independence, Missouri, U.S., was unveiled on October 27, 1997, formally dedicated by U.N. Secretary-General Kofi Annan on April 25, 2003, and is described by its creators as "the only memorial in the world to those persons serving in the Peacekeeping Forces of the United Nations". The 12.5-foot statue is named "Girl with Dove" by its sculptor, Tom Corbin, and in 2003, a four-foot miniature was gifted to the United Nations Headquarters in New York City.

On December 11, 2006, after his final speech as Secretary-General, delivered at the Truman Presidential Library in Independence, Missouri, Annan visited the Peace Plaza for a wreath-laying ceremony.
