= James Roosevelt (lawyer) =

American lawyer (born 1945)

James Roosevelt III
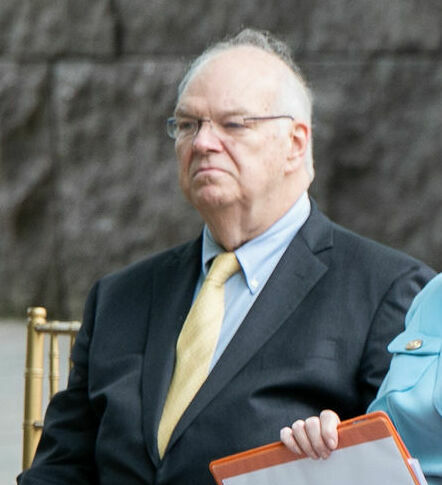
- Roosevelt at the Franklin Delano Roosevelt Memorial anniversary in 2022

Co-Chair of the Democratic National Committee Rules and Bylaws Committee
- Incumbent
- Assumed office January 1, 1995
- Preceded by: Position established

Associate Commissioner of the Social Security Administration
- In office 1977–1999

Personal details
- Born: November 9, 1945 (age 80)
- Party: Democratic
- Spouse: Ann Martha Conlon (m. 1968)
- Children: 3
- Parent(s): James Roosevelt II; Romelle Theresa Schneider
- Relatives: See Roosevelt family
- Education: Harvard University (AB, JD, AMP)
- Occupation: Attorney, politician, investor

Military service
- Allegiance: United States
- Branch/service: United States Navy
- Years of service: 1968–1971
- Rank: Lieutenant
- Unit: U.S. Naval Reserve

James Roosevelt III (born November 9, 1945) is an American attorney, Democratic Party official, and a grandson of U.S. President Franklin D. Roosevelt and Eleanor Roosevelt. He became the co-chair of the Rules and Bylaws Committee of the Democratic National Committee in 1995.

== Early life ==
Roosevelt was born on November 9, 1945, to Representative James Roosevelt II (1907–1991) and Romelle Theresa Schneider (1915–2002). His two full siblings are Michael (born December 7, 1946) and Anna (born January 10, 1948). Through his father, he has two elder half-sisters Sara (1932–2021) and Kate (1936–2002), a younger half-brother Hall (born 1959), and a younger half-sister Rebecca (born 1971). His paternal grandparents were President Franklin D. Roosevelt (1882–1945) and First Lady Eleanor Roosevelt (1884–1962).

Roosevelt graduated from La Salle High School in Pasadena in 1963. He earned his A.B. with honors in government from Harvard College in 1968, his J.D. from Harvard Law School in 1971 and later attended the six-week Advanced Management Program at Harvard Business School.

== Career ==
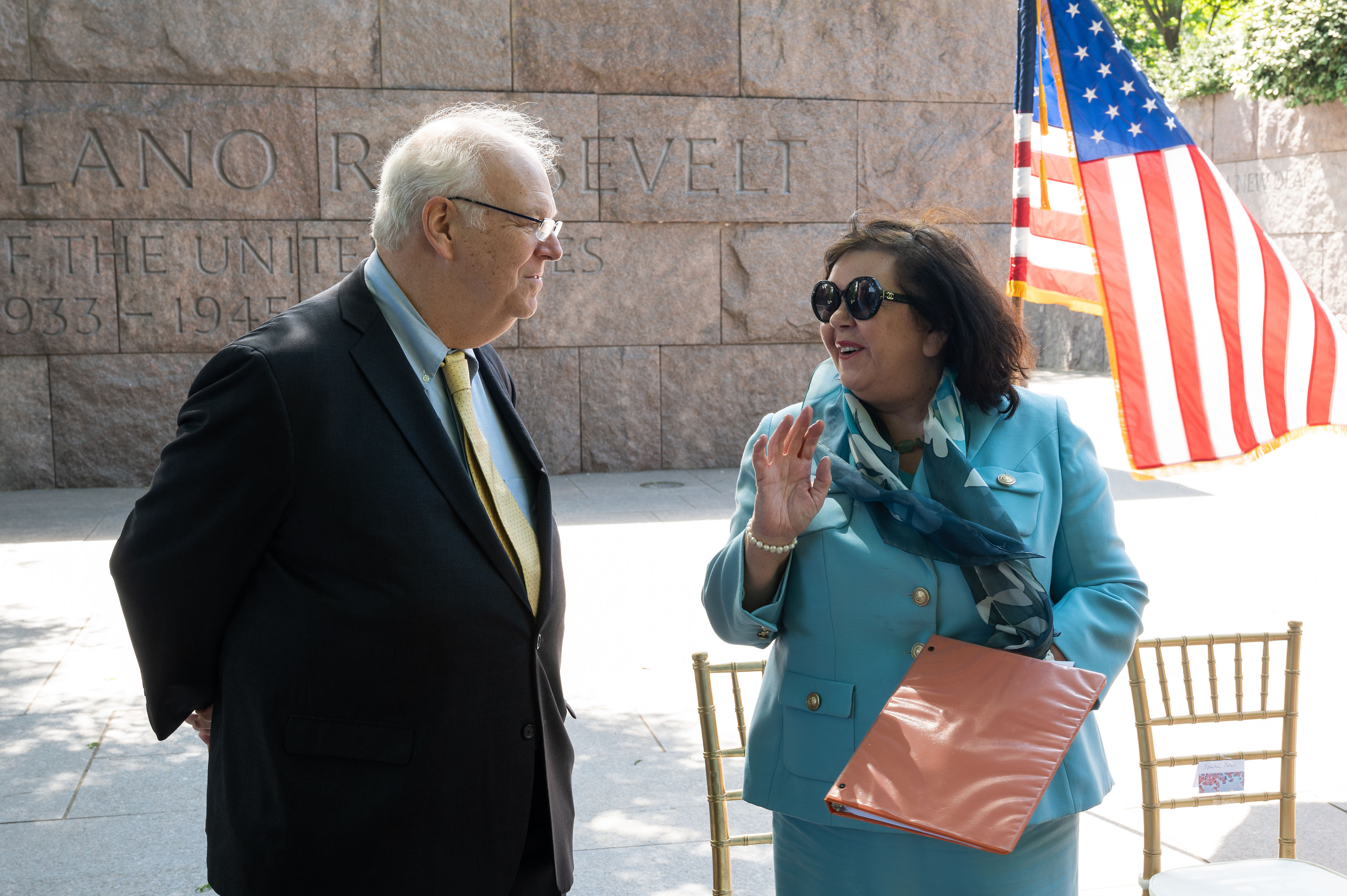
Roosevelt and Ambassador Karen Pierce in 2022

On June 12, 1968, following his graduation from Harvard, he was commissioned in the Naval Reserve and rose to the rank of lieutenant on July 1, 1971.

After obtaining his J.D. from Harvard Law, Roosevelt spent 10 years as partner at Choate, Hall & Stewart in Boston, Massachusetts. Roosevelt was the associate commissioner for Retirement Policy for the Social Security Administration before joining Tufts Health Plan in 1999 as senior vice president and general counsel. He held that position until June 2005, when he became president and chief executive officer of Tufts Health Plan.

In 1986, he ran for Congress in Massachusetts's 8th congressional district, losing the Democratic primary to Joseph P. Kennedy II.

He has also served as chief legal counsel for the Massachusetts Democratic Party. He is past chairman of the board of trustees for the Massachusetts Hospital Association, past president of the American Health Lawyers Association and past chairman of the board of trustees for Mount Auburn Hospital. Currently, Roosevelt serves as chairman of the board of directors for Massachusetts Association of Health Plans, and as a member of the boards at America's Health Insurance Plans, Catholic Democrats, Emmanuel College, and the Kenneth B. Schwartz Center.

He was called upon in 2008 to oversee hearings on controversies related to seating delegates from Florida and Michigan to the 2008 Democratic National Convention. Roosevelt was described as "detail-oriented," and as having great "institutional knowledge." He had not publicly endorsed either Hillary Clinton or Barack Obama before the committee meeting.

== Personal life ==
On June 15, 1968, Roosevelt married Ann Martha Conlon. Together, they have three daughters:

- Kathleen Ann Roosevelt (born 1978), a Barnard College graduate who married Jeffrey Walker in 2007.
- Theresa Marie "Tracy" Roosevelt (born 1982), a Brown University graduate who married Robert O'Loughlin in 2016.
- Maura Amy Roosevelt (born 1984), a Harvard University graduate who married Joshua Fisher in 2014.
