= Press pool =

Group of journalists (US term)

A press pool, media pool, or news pool, is an arrangement wherein a group of news gathering organizations combine their resources in the collection of news. A pool feed is then distributed to members of the broadcast pool who are free to edit it or use it as they see necessary. In the case of print reporters, a written pool report is distributed to all members. A pool spray is a brief photo opportunity, for instance at the White House following a meeting.

== Reasons for pool coverage ==
=== Lack of space ===
Pool coverage is sometimes required because of the nature of the news event being covered. For example, judges will often allow only one broadcast camera in the courtroom during a trial. As a result, interested broadcasters will select one of their own to provide the "pool camera" for the day, with that organization agreeing to share the footage with all other broadcasters in the pool.

Similarly, in the United States a daily rotating pool is set up at the White House for organizations that cover the president. They are allowed special access to certain events with the understanding that the information and footage will then be shared with the rest of the White House press corps. For instance, when the president meets with a foreign dignitary, the two will sometimes make a statement together in the Oval Office. Since it is not possible to accommodate all interested journalists in that room, pool coverage is the only practical way to handle the event.

=== Controlling expense ===
At other times, pool coverage takes place as a more cost-effective way of covering events that only occasionally "make news." For example, the major networks rely on a pool feed of the daily briefing at the State Department for their live coverage, since the press conference is usually only of national interest when there is a significant breaking story relating to international diplomacy. Since "coverage" of such an event consists merely of pointing a camera at a person standing behind a lectern, a pool feed is a practical means of ensuring the event will be available as needed without all five major US TV news outlets paying for their own individual live crews.

=== Large events ===
Pool situations are also often set up because of the physical immensity of certain events. One prominent example of this was the international broadcast of the state funeral of John F. Kennedy, which involved four major venues and a lengthy procession. Likewise, presidential inaugurations and political conventions tend to involve pool coverage in the US (particularly since there is no state broadcaster that would naturally handle the coverage on its own).

== Press pool versus host feed ==
An ordinary broadcast press pool is often confused with a "host feed". While pool coverage is always handled by press organizations, a host feed is provided by a third party (usually the organization being covered). For example, under normal circumstances, the only cameras allowed in the chambers of Congress are those operated by government employees under rules established by congressional leaders. Under such circumstances, press organizations have three choices: take the host feed as it is, rely on unofficial feeds which may be unauthorized or illegal, or have no video at all.

== Expectations of pool members ==
While there are not necessarily formal rules, there tends to be a set of informal expectations for pool members. Primarily, all pool members are expected to "share the load" equally. For example, in the case of ongoing events, a different station might provide a pool reporter or camera every day. For one-time events, each organization may have its own responsibility (such as providing all cameras or mobile trucks). If there are different venues, each location can be covered by a different member of the pool. If there is not a practical way to divide the responsibilities, organizations in the pool will split the cost.

In addition, it is paramount that no pool member uses their special access in order to garner an "exclusive" for themselves. In the case of television, a pool photographer is expected to turn over all of the material that was recorded rather than keeping certain select shots for his or her own employer. Print pool reporters are prohibited from including any detail in their own stories that was not included in the pool report, even if it is only a matter of local color. As a result, White House pool reports are often written in excruciating detail. At a state dinner, the report will likely include what the president ate and details about their clothes.

== See also ==
- Concentration of media ownership
- Embedded reporting
- The Lobby
