= Portland and Westmoreland Places =

- U.S. National Register of Historic Places
- U.S. Historic district
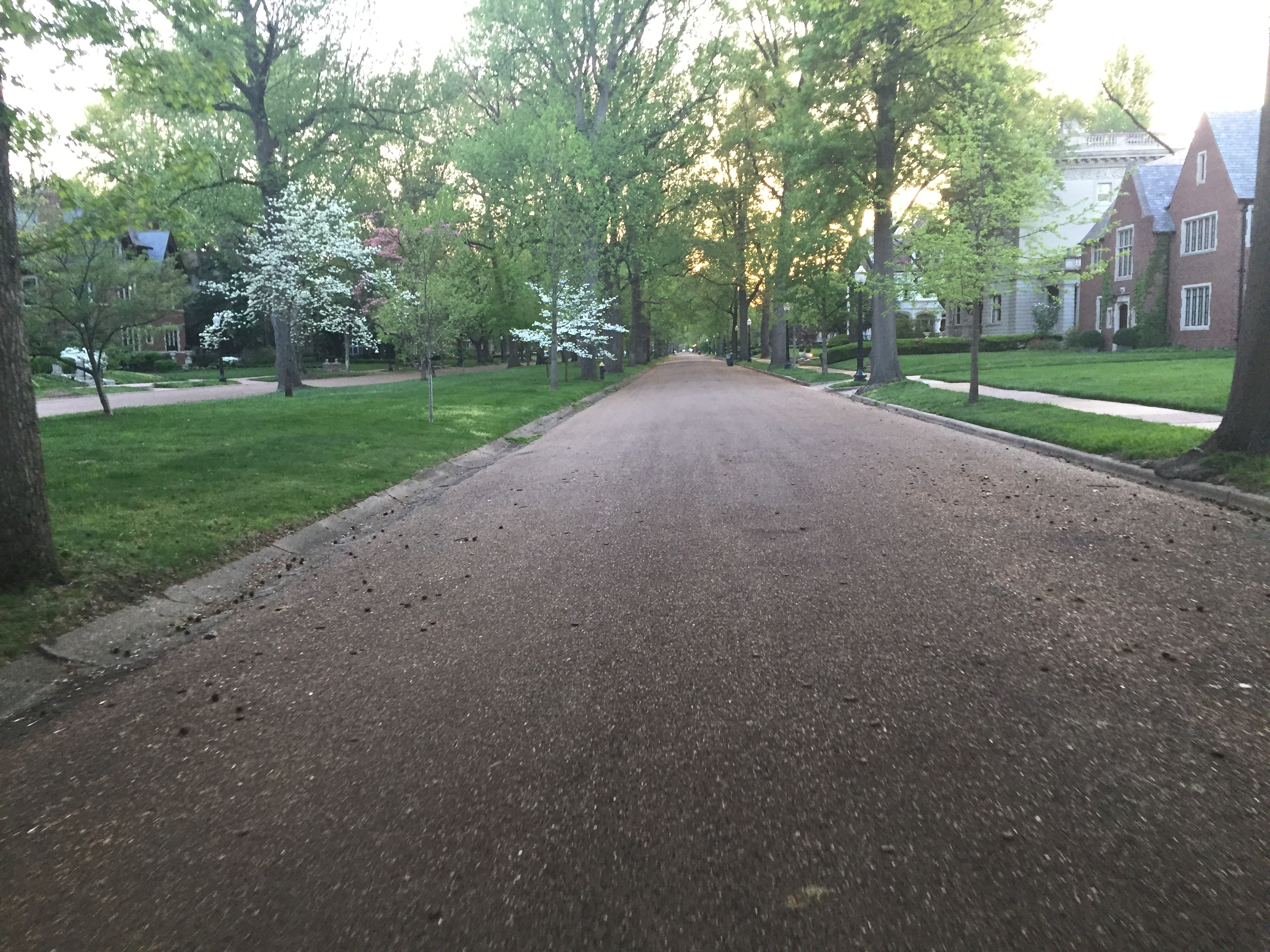
- View down Portland Place, a part of Portland and Westmoreland Places historic district

- Location within St. Louis Location within Missouri Location within the United States
- Location: NE corner of Forest Park, St. Louis, Missouri
- Coordinates: 38°38′48″N 90°16′10″W
- Area: 66.3 acres (26.8 ha)
- Built: 1888
- Architectural style: Late 19th And 20th Century Revivals, Colonial Revival, Late Victorian
- NRHP reference No.: 74002276
- Added to NRHP: February 12, 1974

Portland and Westmoreland Places is a historic district in the Central West End neighborhood of St. Louis, Missouri. It is adjacent to the northeast corner of Forest Park. The district consists of 94 houses built circa 1890 to 1960. A wide variety of architectural styles are represented, including some of the finest examples of late nineteenth and early twentieth century architecture in the city.

The district includes houses along Portland Place and Westmoreland Place between Union Boulevard on the west and North Kingshighway Boulevard to the east. The district was added to the National Register of Historic Places in 1974.

The streets are private streets rather than public ones. In the late 1800s, when the city government of St. Louis had not yet adopted a policy of aggressively paving streets, homeowners in the area privately paved the roads at their own expense, but also allowed them the right of exclusion on them.

== 2020 incident ==
In the wake of the murder of George Floyd, on June 28 around 500 protesters marched to Mayor Lyda Krewson's house. They entered through a gate that said "private street" and used the private street Portland Place to try and cut through to hers a couple blocks away. Two residents, Mark and Patricia McCloskey, pointed guns at the protesters, and a video of them doing so went viral, being retweeted by President Donald Trump.

On July 20, the couple were each charged with one count of unlawful use of a weapon, a felony. They pled guilty to misdemeanors and were later pardoned by the governor.
