= 2020 Republican National Convention =

U.S. political event held in Charlotte, North Carolina

- 2020 presidential election

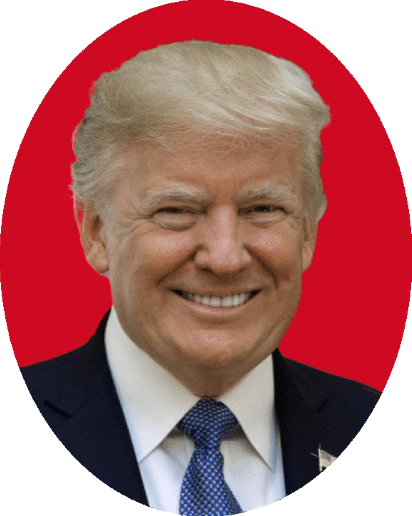
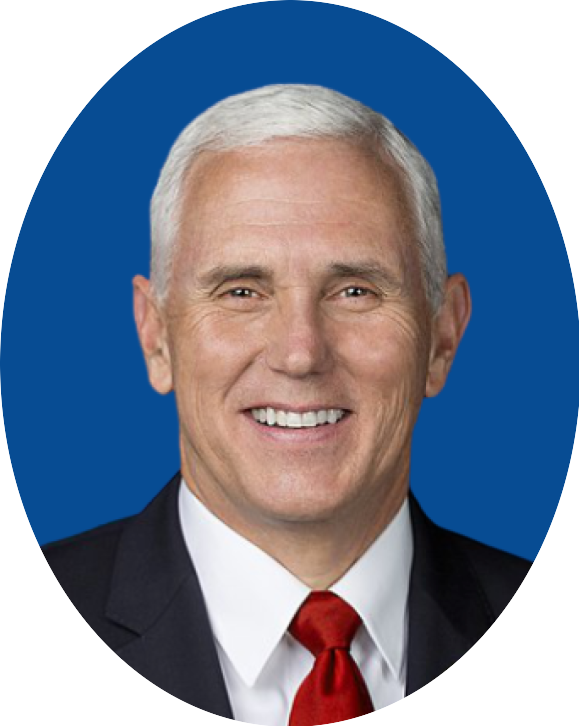
- Nominees; Trump and Pence

Convention
- Dates: August 24–27, 2020
- City: Charlotte, North Carolina (day 1); Washington, D.C., and various locations remotely (days 1–4)
- Venue: Charlotte Convention Center (day 1); Andrew W. Mellon Auditorium and various locations remotely (days 1–4)
- Notable speakers: Donald Trump; Melania Trump; Mike Pence; Karen Pence; Nikki Haley; Herschel Walker; Mike Pompeo; Myron Lizer; Kristi Noem; Franklin Graham; Ben Carson; Donald Trump Jr.; Ivanka Trump; Eric Trump; Tiffany Trump; Lara Trump; Vernon Jones; Kimberly Guilfoyle; Alice Marie Johnson; Kayleigh McEnany

Candidates
- Presidential nominee: Donald Trump of Florida
- Vice-presidential nominee: Mike Pence of Indiana

Voting
- Total delegates: 2,550
- Votes needed for nomination: 1,276
- Results (president): Trump (FL): 2,550 (100.00%)
- Results (vice president): Pence (IN): 2,550 (100.00%)
- Ballots: 1

The 2020 Republican National Convention in which delegates of the United States Republican Party selected the party's nominees for president and vice president in the 2020 United States presidential election, was held from August 24 to 27, 2020.

Due to the COVID-19 pandemic in the United States, plans to convene a traditional large-scale convention were cancelled a few weeks before the convention. Primary venues included the Charlotte Convention Center in Charlotte, North Carolina, and the Andrew W. Mellon Auditorium in Washington, D.C., with many other remote venues also being utilized.

The convention was originally scheduled to be held at the Spectrum Center in Charlotte, North Carolina, but on June 2, 2020, President Donald Trump (who was to be renominated at the convention) and the Republican National Committee jointly decided to pull the event from Charlotte after the North Carolina state government declined to agree to Trump's demands to allow the convention to take place with a full crowd and without public health measures designed to prevent the spread of the COVID-19 pandemic, such as social distancing and face coverings. It was attempted to organize a full-scale convention in Jacksonville, Florida, but those plans were abandoned on July 23 and a downscaled convention was instead staged.

Some convention proceedings were still held in Charlotte, but the convention's prime-time program was staged primarily in Washington, D.C. Most speeches were delivered at Washington, D.C.'s Andrew W. Mellon Auditorium. In contrast to most conventions, the majority of speeches were pre-recorded. Other events and festivities, including Trump's acceptance speech, were held remotely at various locations, including Fort McHenry and the White House.

For the nomination, Trump faced only token opposition in the Republican primaries and caucuses, and had accumulated all but one of the available delegates during the primary season, with former Massachusetts governor Bill Weld winning a single delegate in the Iowa caucuses. Trump had unofficially clinched the Republican nomination in March 2020, when he reached 1,276 pledged delegates.

== Background ==
=== Allocation of pledged delegates ===
The base number of pledged delegates that were allocated to each of the 50 states were 10 at-large delegates, plus 3 district delegates for each congressional district. A fixed number of pledged delegates were allocated to Washington D.C., and each of the five U.S. territories. Bonus delegates are awarded to each state and territory based on whether it had elected (if applicable) through December 31, 2019 (after the 2019 off-year elections): a Republican governor, Republican majorities in either one or both chambers in its state legislature, one or two Republicans to the U.S. Senate, or a Republican majority in its delegation to the U.S. House of Representatives. A state was also awarded additional bonus delegates if it was won by the Republican candidate, Trump, in the 2016 presidential election.

== Logistics ==
=== Planning and staging ===
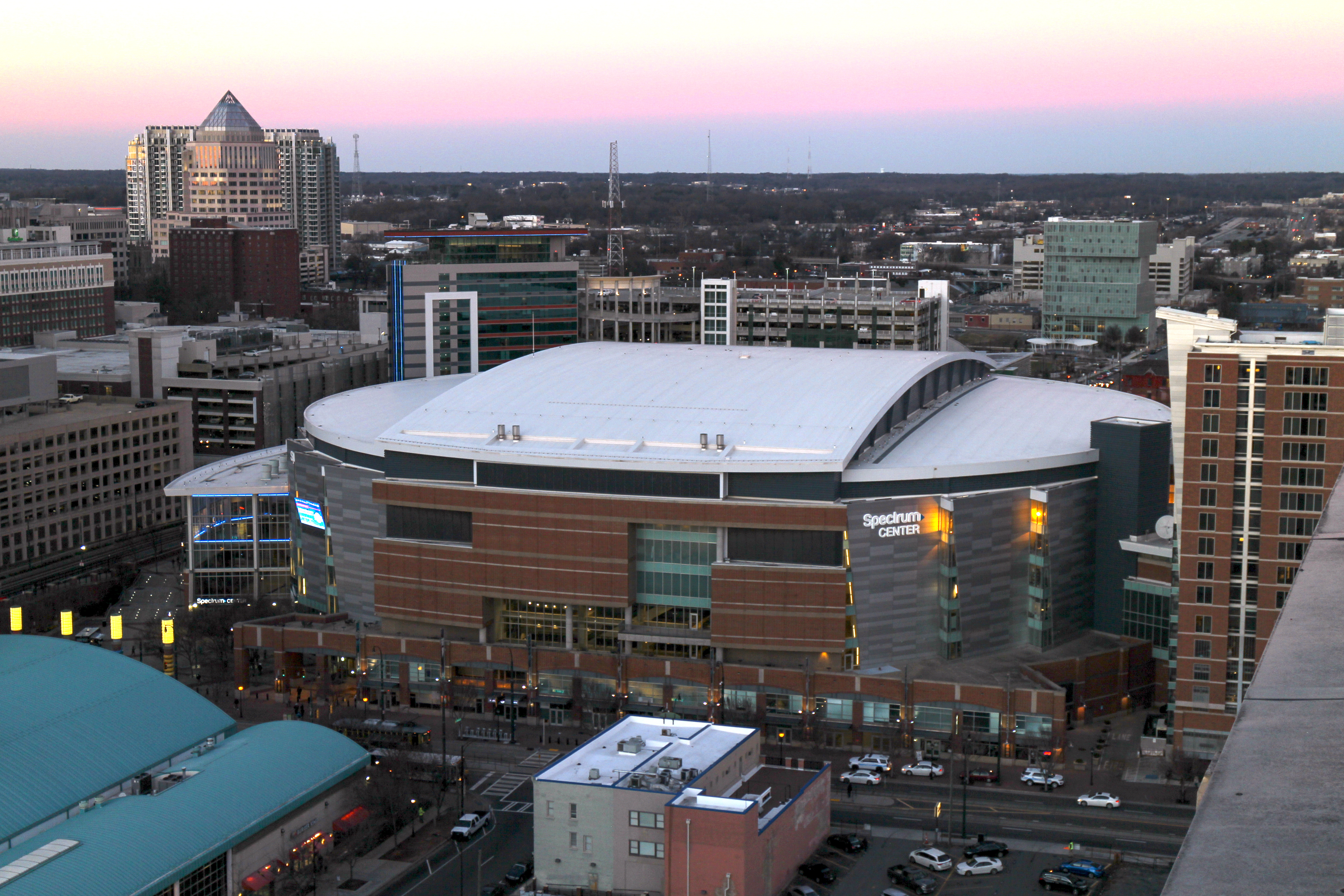
The Spectrum Center in Charlotte, North Carolina, was originally to be the site of the convention.

Charlotte, North Carolina, was the only city to officially submit a bid for the convention. On July 18, 2018, the RNC Site Selection Committee voted unanimously to recommend holding the convention in Charlotte. The Republican National Committee made the selection official on July 20.

The convention was originally scheduled to be held at the Spectrum Center in Charlotte, North Carolina, but on June 2, 2020, President Donald Trump (who was to be renominated at the convention) and the Republican National Committee jointly decided to pull the event from Charlotte after the North Carolina state government declined to agree to Trump's demands to allow the convention to take place with a full crowd and without public health measures designed to prevent the spread of the COVID-19 pandemic, such as social distancing and face coverings.

Trump began searching for a new city to stage the convention. Republican National Committee officials stressed that even if the majority of activity was going to outside the city, the mechanics of the convention would remain in Charlotte. On June 11, the Republican National Committee confirmed that the main events and speeches of the convention would move to Jacksonville, Florida, including Trump's nomination acceptance speech on August 27 at the VyStar Veterans Memorial Arena. However the convention's official business was to remain in Charlotte with a greatly reduced agenda and number of delegates. August 24 was to see a portion of the convention hosted in Charlotte, with the following three days of the convention being held in Jacksonville.

With a COVID-19 case surge in Florida occurring by mid-July, the possibility of the Jacksonville convention being canceled as well began to be discussed. Several of the local health restrictions in Charlotte that had prompted the RNC to seek a different location—requirements for people to wear masks and practice social distancing—were later adopted by Jacksonville. Plans to hold the convention in Jacksonville were abandoned on July 23.

On August 14, it was announced that much of the convention would take place at the Andrew W. Mellon Auditorium in Washington, D.C. (part of the William Jefferson Clinton Federal Building), which would serve as the convention's "central hub". With some events in Charlotte, this became the first since the 1860 Democratic National Conventions to be centered in two different cities.

Most speeches of the convention were delivered at Washington, D.C.'s Andrew W. Mellon Auditorium. Other events and festivities, including Trump's acceptance speech, were held remotely at various locations, including Fort McHenry and the White House. By tradition, because Republicans held the presidency, their convention was conducted after the 2020 Democratic National Convention, which was held from August 17–20.

=== Format ===
The nomination event took place in Charlotte, North Carolina, as the party was contractually obligated to conduct its official business there. Only just over 300 delegates were expected to attend.

The main speeches took place every night from 8:30 to 11:00 p.m. EDT. Headlining speakers spoke after 10:00 p.m. The speeches took place in Washington, D.C., rather than in Charlotte.

=== Staging of Trump's acceptance speech ===
Stage being erected at the White House for Trump's acceptance speech

On July 28, Trump said that he would accept the nomination in person in Charlotte. However, on August 5, he said he would "likely" accept the Republican nomination from the White House. A decision to accept a party's nomination from the White House would break a norm; the Associated Press noted that it would "mark an unprecedented use of federal property for partisan political purposes." The proposed plans also raised legal questions under the Hatch Act, which creates certain prohibitions on the use of public resources for political activity, and the legality of the plan was questioned by Republican senators Ron Johnson and John Thune. While the president is exempt from the Hatch Act's restrictions, the law applies to other federal employees. The ethics director of the Campaign Legal Center stated that "any federal employee who helps facilitate the acceptance speech risks violating the Hatch Act." Nonetheless, Trump tweeted that he had decided to hold it on the White House lawn anyway, announcing on August 13 that he had finalized this decision. It was ultimately decided that Trump's speech would be delivered from the South Lawn.

Since Trump accepted his nomination remotely, it was the first time a Republican nominee has done so since Alf Landon in 1936. Since Democratic nominee Joe Biden also accepted the Democratic nomination remotely (the first time a Democrat has done so since Franklin D. Roosevelt in 1944); 2020 was the first election since 1928 in which neither major-party nominee accepted their nominations in-person.

A massive fireworks display (using 7,800 fireworks) was staged to close the convention following Trump's speech. The display lasted roughly six minutes. The display included fireworks which spelled-out the words "Trump 2020".

=== Security ===
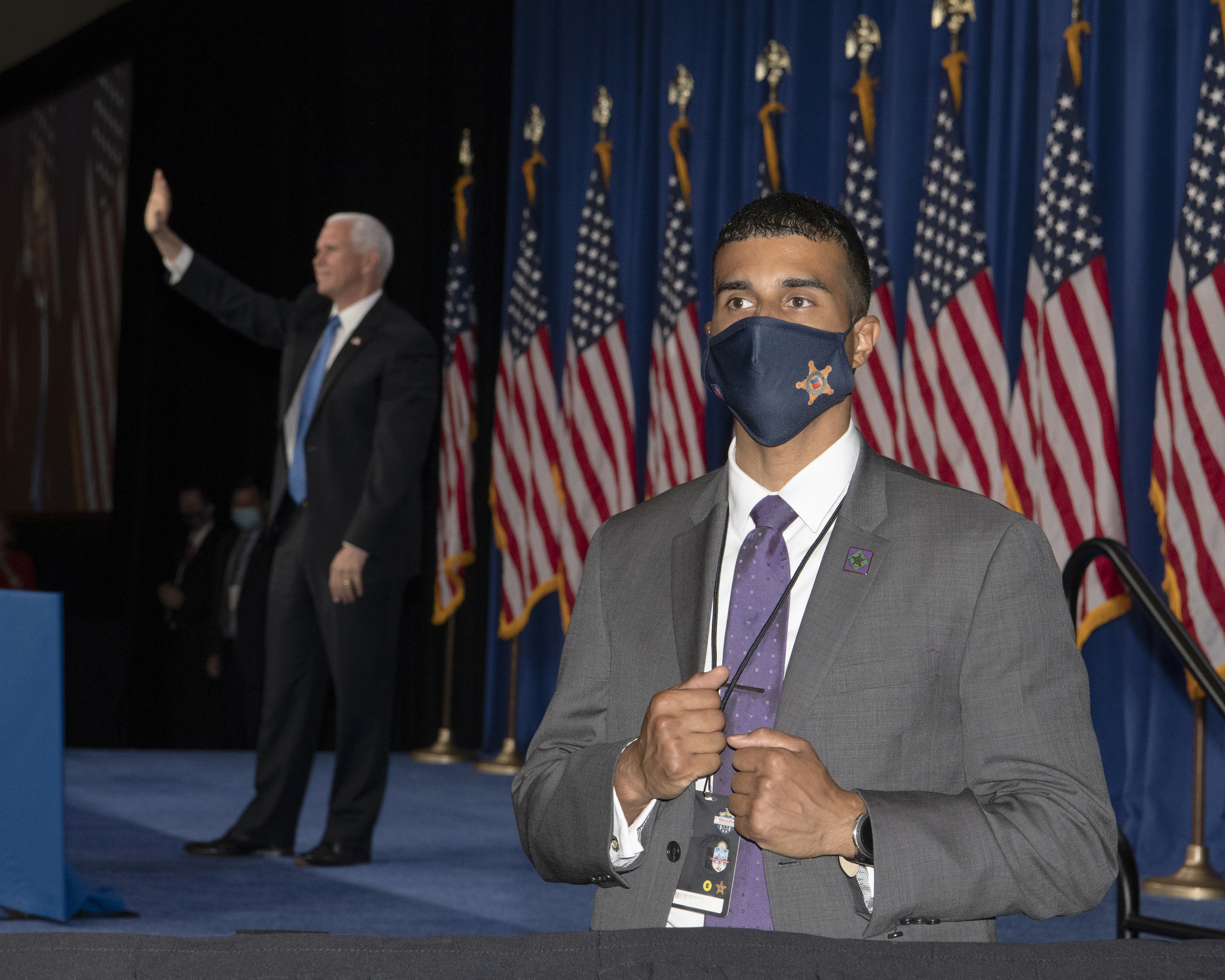
A United States Secret Service agent stands guard while Vice President Mike Pence speaks at the Charlotte Convention Center during the morning session of the convention's opening day

The Republican National Convention was originally to be a National Special Security Event. The originally-planned Charlotte convention had been awarded this status. The plans for a convention in Jacksonville had also been awarded this status. Jacksonville had been given $30 million federal grants for security.

The city of Jacksonville had paid $69,777 to a consulting company that was assisting them in security. When the convention was slated for Jacksonville, there had been concern expressed by Duval County sheriff Mike Williams over the ability of local law enforcement to provide security due to poor funding and lack of advance planning as a result of the late change of venue.

== Platform ==
Rather than adopting a new party platform, uniquely the Republicans decided simply to recycle their 2016 party platform, including several references to the "current president" and attacks on "the administration" (which in 2016 referred to Barack Obama and the Obama administration). The decision was criticized by Republican activists. In a tweet, Trump said that he would "prefer a new and updated platform, short form, if possible."

The RNC did not do this. Instead, it issued a one-page document stating opposition to the "Obama/Biden administration" and supporting President Trump's instead.

== Schedule ==
The ultimate format of the convention had much of its content be prerecorded.

The official business of the convention, including the formal nominations of President Trump and Vice President Pence, was held in a morning session held August 24 in Charlotte, North Carolina.

The business session in Charlotte included the formal renominations of both Pence (by voice vote) and Trump (by a traditional roll-call of the states). The voting was paused for addresses by Scott Walker (former governor of Wisconsin), Vice President Pence, and President Trump; all of whom had flown to Charlotte to address the delegates in-person. Trump's speech to the delegates ran for more than an hour.

At one point, no press was not going to be granted access to the Charlotte formal convention meeting. On August 1, a Republican convention spokesperson said that, "Given the health restrictions and limitations in place within the state of North Carolina, we are planning for the Charlotte activities to be closed press" for the entirety of the convention. The decision to bar press was criticized by the White House Correspondents' Association. However, a Republican National Committee official cited by the Associated Press indicated that "no final decisions have been made and that logistics and press coverage options were still being evaluated." However, on August 12, the chairman of the credentials committee, Doyle Webb, said that a tiny group of reporters would indeed be permitted to cover the one-day official convention business, including the nominations of Trump and Pence.

After the formal business of the convention in Charlotte concluded, the convention moved to Washington, D.C.. Further convention programming (including speeches and entertainment) was conducted in the nation's capital city, as well as several remote locations outside of D.C. In D.C., production for four nights of prime time convention programming was anchored at the Andrew W. Mellon Auditorium in Washington, D.C., where most speeches were filmed. However, various components of the convention were filmed elsewhere, including at locations outside of Washington, D.C.

Most speeches were pre-taped.

At events with in-person audiences, such as First Lady Melania Trump and Vice President Mike Pence's speeches, the Centers for Disease Control and Prevention-recommended practices of protective masks and social distancing were largely absent.

== Nomination votes ==
The votes on re-nomination took place during the August 24 morning session in Charlotte.

Under the original full-scale in-person convention plans, 2,550 delegates and half as many alternates were to attend the convention. Only one-sixth of the delegates (336 out of 2,550) gathered physically in Charlotte. with six delegates from each state and territory. On August 5, convention planners announced a number of health and safety rules for the delegates, vendors, and staff who will gather physically. With most of the convention canceled, proxy voting via the attendees was the method of choice. Donald Trump, the sole candidate, received 2,550 certified votes (100% of the total), including one delegate that had been pledged for Bill Weld. (This is because party rules set a minimum of won states to be placed in nomination; as Weld had won no states, he could not be considered.)

Scott Walker placed Pence's name in nomination. Pence was nominated by voice vote. This was the first time the vice-presidential nomination came first. Michael Whatley, the chair of the North Carolina Republican Party, placed the president's name in nomination and Florida state senator Joe Gruters seconded the nomination. This was followed by the traditional roll-call of the states.

== Notable speeches ==
=== Kimberly Guilfoyle ===
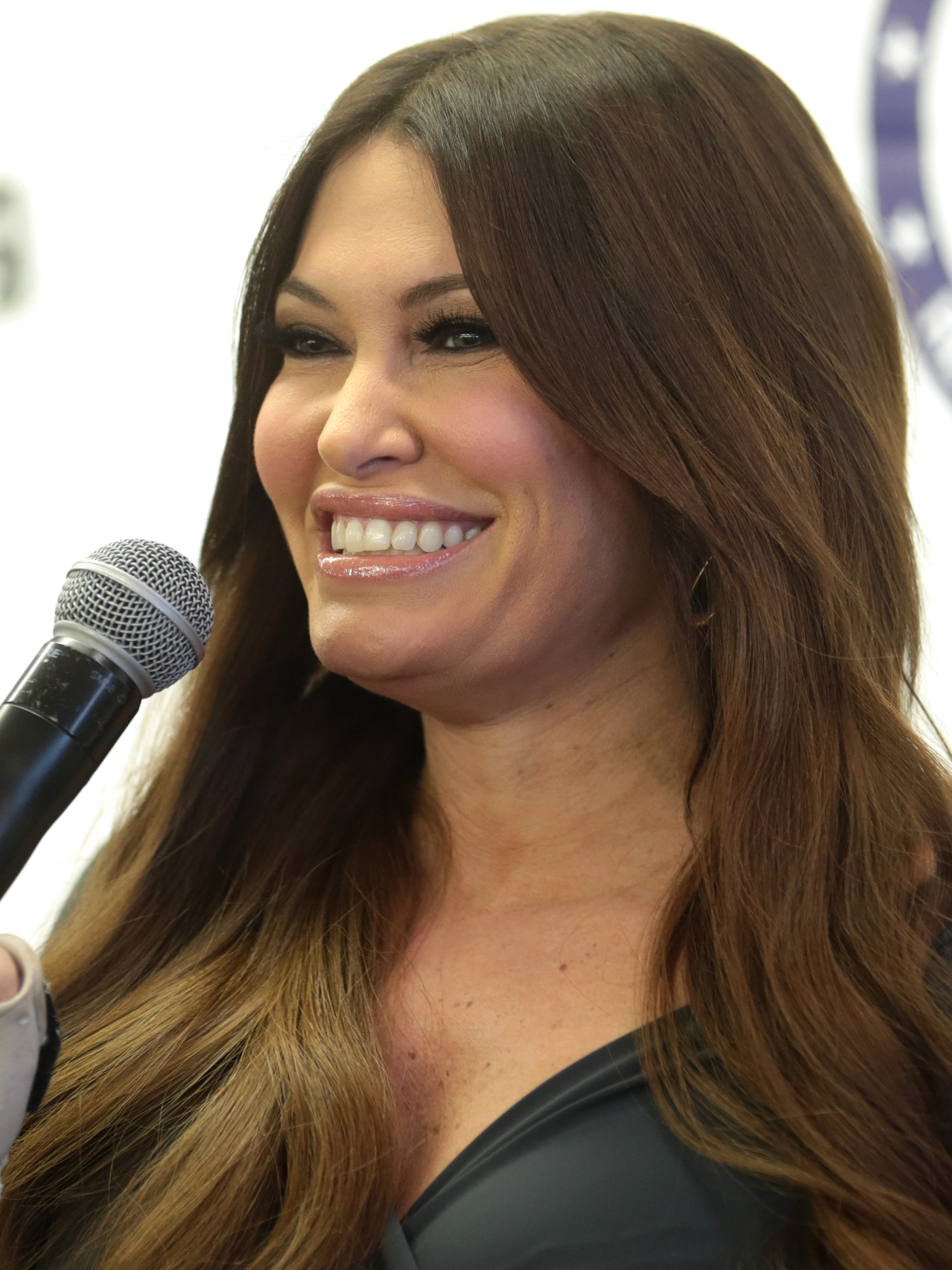

Presidential leadership is not guaranteed. It is a choice! Biden, Harris, and the rest of the socialists will fundamentally change this nation....They will defund, dismantle and destroy America's law enforcement! When you are in trouble and need police, don't count on the Democrats!… President Trump is the leader who will rebuild the promise of America and ensure that every citizen can realize their American Dream. Ladies and gentlemen, leaders and fighters for freedom and liberty and the American Dream, the best is yet to come!

— Kimberly Guilfoyle at the 2020 Republican National Convention

Kimberly Guilfoyle, a Trump campaign spokesperson and the girlfriend of the president's son Donald Trump Jr., spoke on the opening night of the convention. She painted a stark picture of an America led by Democratic nominee Joe Biden. Guilfoyle attacked Democrats, blaming them for a "cancel culture" amongst other attacks. In part of her speech, she criticized the governance of California, a state whose current governor was her ex-husband, Democratic governor Gavin Newsom. Guilfoyle shouted most of her remarks, and her delivery was consequentially characterized as "loud", resulting in uttering the last sentences of her speech, specifically "the best is yet to come!!!" spurring the online "Guilfoyle Challenge". Her speech was characterized as "dark" in its tone and delivery, for which it received some criticism from both conservative and liberal figures.

In her speech, Guilfoyle declared herself to be a proud "first generation American". While Guilfoyle's father indeed immigrated from Ireland, this claim in her remarks also made the implication that her mother, native to Puerto Rico, was an "immigrant". This runs contrary to the fact that Puerto Rico has been a part of the United States since 1898, Puerto Ricans were granted citizenship in 1917, and the territory was extended birthright citizenship in 1940, meaning that Guilfoyle's mother was a United States citizen by birth.

=== Nikki Haley ===
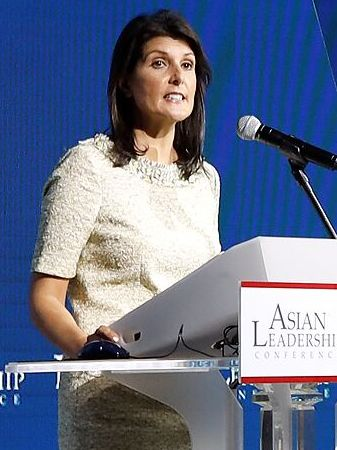

In much of the Democratic Party, it's now fashionable to say that America is racist. That is a lie. America is not a racist country...America is a story that's a work in progress. Now is the time to build on that progress, and make America even freer, fairer and better for everyone. That's why it's so tragic to see so much of the Democratic Party turning a blind eye towards riots and rage

— Nikki Haley at the 2020 Republican National Convention

Former United States Ambassador to the United Nations Nikki Haley spoke on the opening night of the convention. Early into her speech, she quoted fellow former United States Ambassador to the United Nations Jeane Kirkpatrick as having said, "Democrats always blame America first". This was a key line from Kirkpatrick's own speech to the 1984 Republican National Convention.

In her speech, Haley invoked her parents, both immigrants from India.

Haley also linked Democratic nominee Joe Biden with the "socialist left". She also painted the prospect of a Biden presidency as beneficial to the interests of China and Iran. Haley offered strong criticism of the foreign policy of the Obama administration, in which Biden served as vice president. She argued that while Trump "has a record of strength and success," Biden "has a record of weakness and failure," and that while Trump has "moved America forward," Biden has "held America back".

=== Tim Scott ===
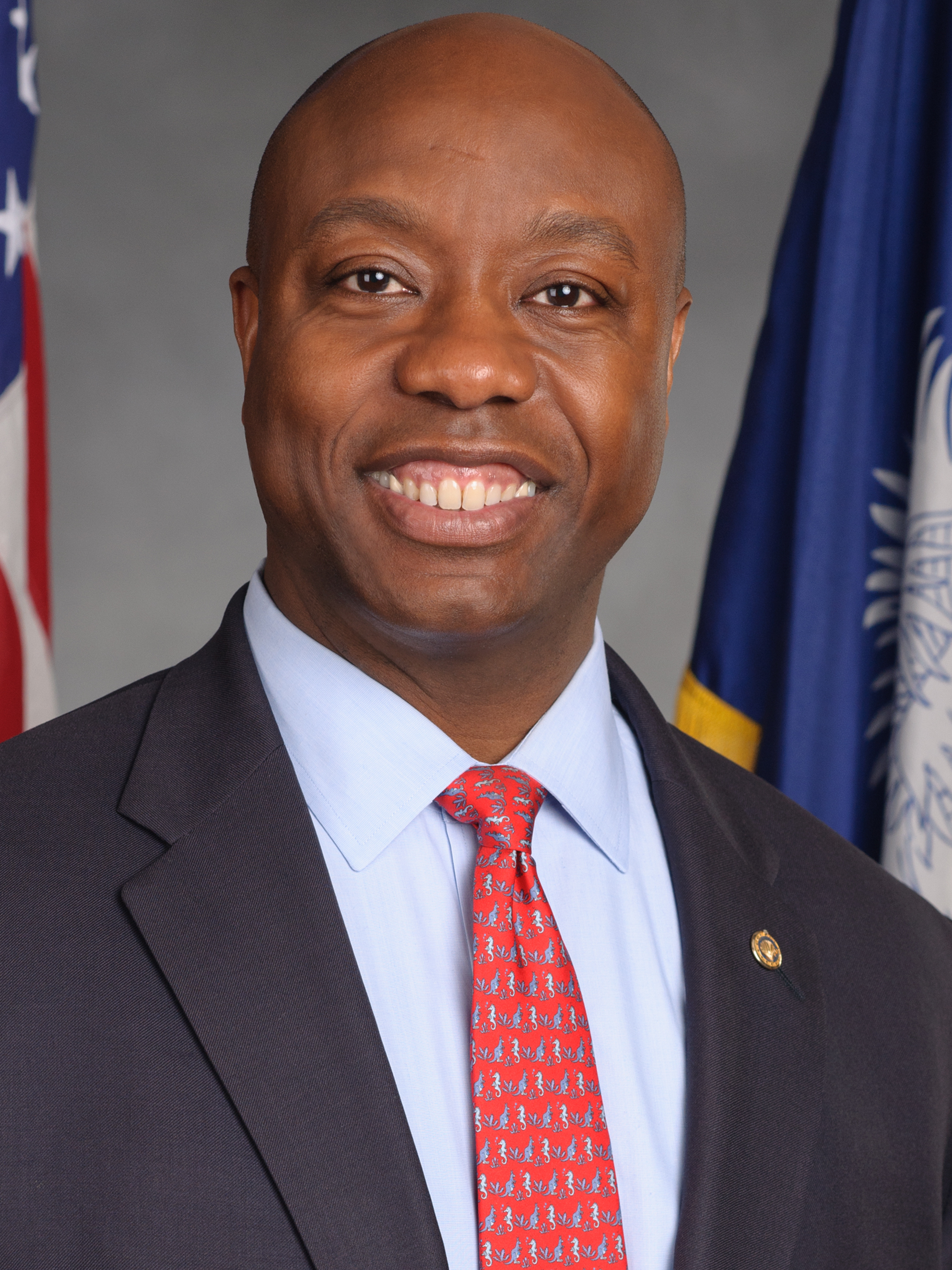

My grandfather's 99th birthday would have been tomorrow. Growing up, he had to cross the street if a white person was coming. He suffered the indignity of being forced out of school as a third grader to pick cotton, and never learned to read or write. Yet, he lived to see his grandson become the first African American to be elected to both the United States House and Senate. Our family went from Cotton to Congress in one lifetime. And that's why I believe the next American century can be better than the last. There are millions of families like mine across this nation...full of potential seeking to live the American Dream.

And I'm here tonight to tell you that supporting the Republican ticket gives you the best chance of making that dream a reality.

— Tim Scott at the 2020 Republican National Convention

United States senator from South Carolina Tim Scott spoke on the opening night of the convention. In his speech, Scott declared that, "2020 has tested our nation in ways we haven't seen for decades," invoking the COVID-19 pandemic as well as the murder of George Floyd and shooting of Breonna Taylor as having tested the United States.

Scott praised the Trump administration's actions on police reform. Scott cited the opportunity zones as something he had worked with Trump on creating (neglecting to mention the key involvement of Democrats Cory Booker and Ron Kind, who had proposed the idea in collaboration with Scott).

Scott declared his support for school choice. He declared opposition to cancel culture. He declared his belief in "the goodness of America".

He quoted Democratic presidential nominee Joe Biden as having said numerous remarks offensive to him as a black man. He also criticized Biden's actions, such as his involvement in the 1994 Crime Bill.

Scott accused Biden of wanting to give tax cuts to "blue state" millionaires as the expense of most Americans. Scott painted Trump's own Tax Cuts and Jobs Act of 2017 as having benefitied "single moms, working families, and those in need".

Scott attempted to tie Biden and his running mate Kamala Harris to socialism. He declared, "Joe Biden's radical Democrats are trying to permanently transform what it means to be an American. Make no mistake, Joe Biden and Kamala Harris want a cultural revolution. A fundamentally different America. If we let them, they will turn our country into a socialist utopia, and history has taught us that path only leads to pain and misery, especially for hard-working people hoping to rise."

Scott's speech also featured autobiographical elements.

=== President Donald Trump ===
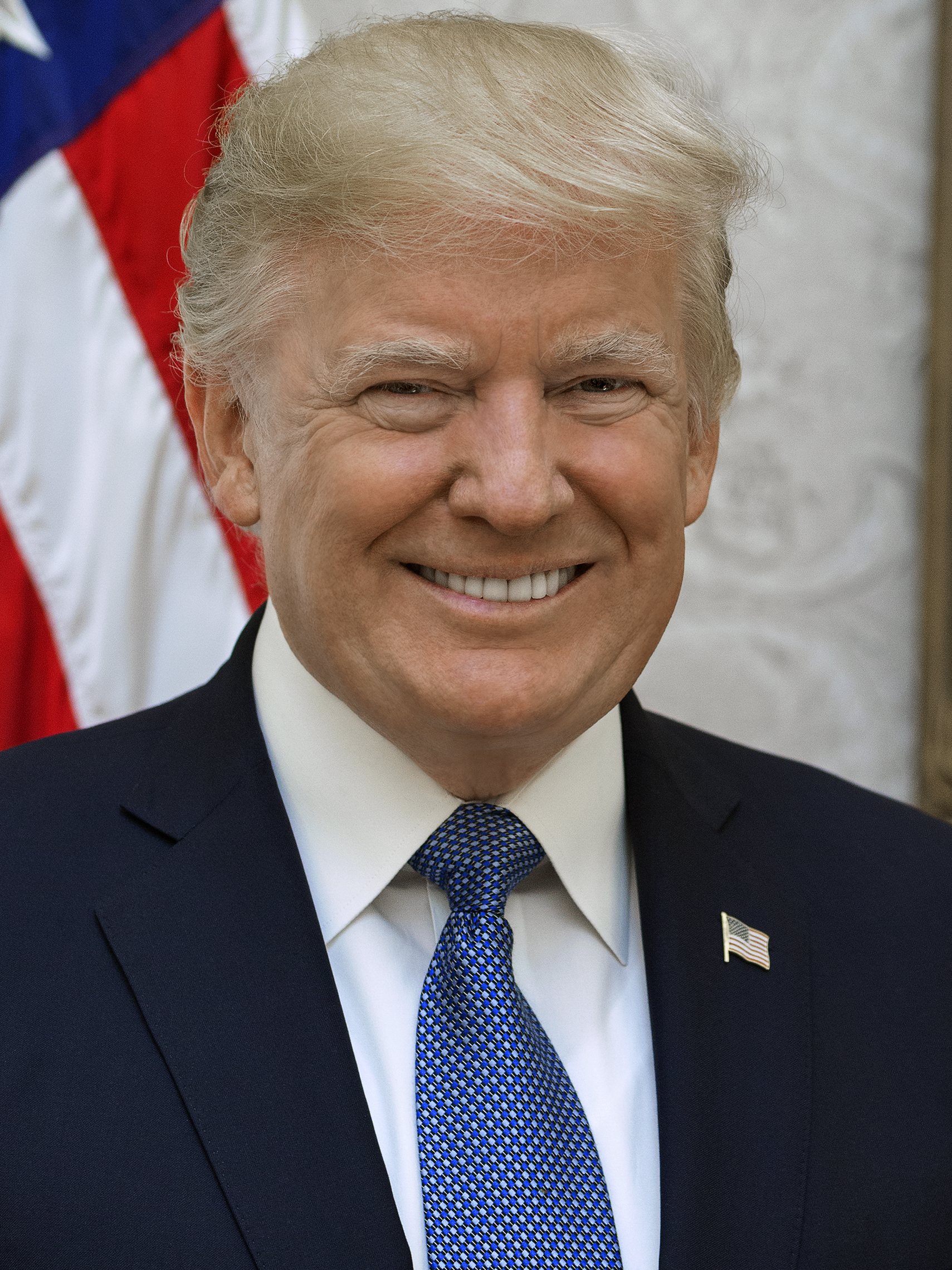

From the moment I left my former life behind—and it was a good life—I have done nothing but fight for you. I did what our political establishment never expected and could never forgive, breaking the cardinal rule of Washington politics. I kept my promise. Together we have ended the rule of the failed political class, and they are desperate to get their power back by any means necessary. You have seen that. They are angry at me because instead of putting them first, I very simply said, "America first."

— Donald Trump at the 2020 Republican National Convention

President Donald Trump delivered his acceptance speech on the final night of the convention from the South Lawn of the White House in Washington, D.C.

Trump's speech sought to defend his own record as president, especially his administration's response to the COVID-19 pandemic.

Trump mentioned his main opponent, Democratic nominee Joe Biden, by name 41 times. In contrast, Biden's own Democratic nomination acceptance speech one week prior featured no utterances of Trump's name. The speech cast Biden as "weak", and an instrument of left-wing portion of the Democratic Party, going as far as to dub him a "Trojan Horse for socialism." He also characterized Biden as a potential, "destroyer of American greatness." The speech also attacked Biden's record.

According to the American Presidency Project, at 70 minutes duration, Trump's acceptance speech was the second-longest major-party nomination acceptance speech, behind only his own 2016 acceptance speech.

=== Donald Trump Jr. ===
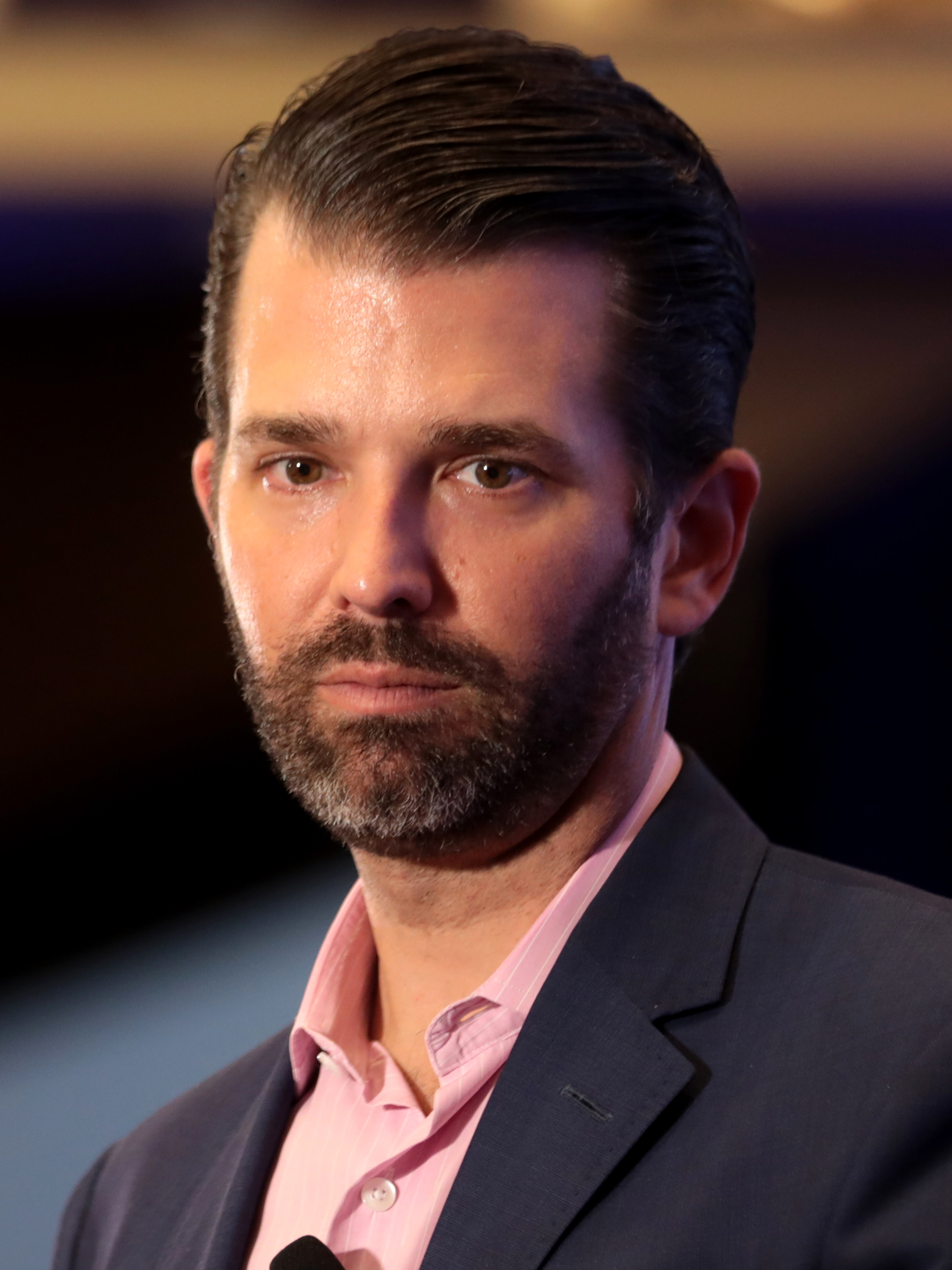

People of faith are under attack. You're not allowed to go to church, but mass chaos in the streets gets a pass. It's almost like this election is shaping up to be church, work and school versus rioting, looting and vandalism.

— Donald Trump Jr. at the 2020 Republican National Convention

The son of the president spoke on the opening night of the convention. He cast a picture of a descent into anarchy, violence, and oppression if the Democratic ticket wins the election. Trump Jr. portrayed the opposition as plotting to destroy the American way of life. He warned that Democrats, "want to bully us into submission. If they get their way, it will no longer be the silent majority. It will be the silenced majority." He also accused them of, "attacking the very principles on which our nation was founded—freedom of thought, freedom of speech, freedom of religion, the rule of law."

He derided his father's main opponent for the presidency, Democratic nominee Biden, with numerous nicknames, including "Beijing Biden" and "the Loch Ness Monster of the swamp". He touted the shape of the economy prior to COVID-19, and blamed the pandemic on the Chinese Communist Party.

== Demonstrations and protests ==
In the days before the convention, protests began to arise against it in Charlotte, North Carolina, and Washington, D.C.

=== Counter-convention ===
In May 2020, Republicans opposed to Trump's presidency announced their intent to host a competing "Convention on Founding Principles" to occur at the same time as the Republican National Convention in Charlotte. Among the scheduled speakers are former CIA director Michael Hayden; former FBI director James Comey; some former Republican elected officials, including former New Jersey governor Christine Todd Whitman, former congressman Mark Sanford, former congressman Charlie Dent, and Nebraska state senator John S. McCollister; Trump's onetime communications director Anthony Scaramucci; 2016 independent presidential candidate Evan McMullin; and several founders of the Lincoln Project.

=== The Commitment March: Get Your Knee Off Our Necks ===
Al Sharpton's National Action Network initially held permits to have a large march and rally of up to 100,000 people in the National Mall for August 28, with earlier events taking place in the days just before. This event was permitted well before the Republicans' convention was moved to the city.

== Controversies ==
=== Politicization of the office of Secretary of State ===
Secretary of state Mike Pompeo's convention address, delivered while on a diplomatic trip to Israel, has been cited as a possible Hatch Act violation.

On August 25, the same day that Pompeo spoke, chairman of the House Foreign Affairs Subcommittee on Oversight and Investigations and Democrat Joaquin Castro opened a congressional investigation into the legality of Pompeo's planned speech. On October 26, 2020, Democrats Eliot Engel (Chairman of the House Committee on Foreign Affairs) and Nita Lowey (Chairwoman of the House Committee on Appropriations), confirmed that the Office of Special Counsel had launched a probe into possible Hatch Act violations related to Pompeo's speech.

The appropriateness of having the incumbent secretary of state, Mike Pompeo, address a political convention was questioned. Pompeo's modern predecessors had avoided political conventions while serving as secretary of state. The speech came despite Pompeo having warned other diplomats against "improperly" taking part in politics.

=== Politicization of the White House and other federal government sites ===
Sophia Ankel of USA Today observed that the use of sites that were symbolic of the federal government for a political convention marked a divergence from political norms and was broadly criticized. The convention use of the White House as a setting for parts of the convention brought criticism which argued that Trump was utilizing the White House for purely political events to a degree that none of his presidential predecessors had.

Some experts and politicians questioned the legality of the use of the White House for convention speeches and other portions of the convention. The questions of it legality centered upon the premise that any federal employees (exempting the president and vice president themselves) who assisted in such campaigning activities on a federal government property were potentially violating the Hatch Act. The convention speech by Ivanka Trump, an official White House advisor, on the South Lawn of the White House while holding an official position in the federal government was also cited as a potential Hatch Act violation.

The use of property owned by the National Park Service for the convention's closing fireworks display was argued by some experts to raise ethics concerns and constitute potential violations of the Hatch Act.

==== Chad Wolf's participation in naturalization ceremony segment ====
Acting United States Secretary of Homeland Security Chad Wolf's appearance in the naturalization ceremony, which was part of the convention's program, has been cited by some as a potential violation of the Hatch Act. Citizens for Responsibility and Ethics in Washington filed a complaint with the Office of Special Counsel, arguing this was a clear violation of the Hatch Act.

=== Use of official acts of office in convention program ===
Journalists have questioned the ethics of President Trump using video of official acts of office, such as a video of a pardon ceremony and participating in a prerecorded naturalization ceremony, as portions of the convention program. These have been criticized as a politicization of government functions. The display of such presidential powers as part of a political party convention diverged United States political norms.

=== Use of unwitting participants ===
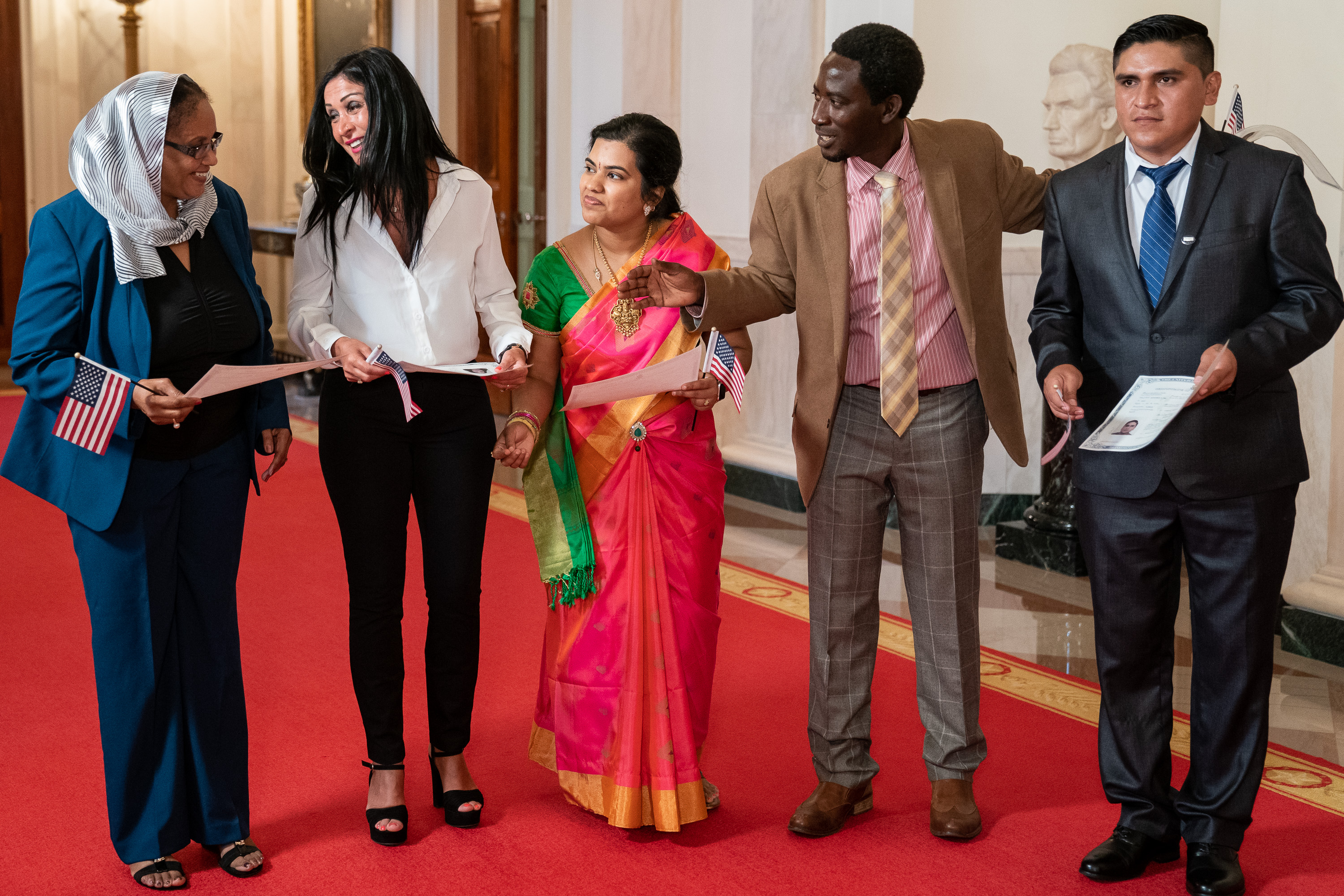
Among others, several of the participants of the featured naturalization ceremony came forward to complain that they had not been informed that they were going to be featured in the Republican National Convention

Several individuals featured in the convention were unwitting of their inclusion in the convention. Several of the participants of the naturalization ceremony have come forward to complain that they were not informed that it was going to be part of the Republican National Convention. Several of those featured in a video segment with residents of the New York City Housing Authority complained that they did not know that their interviews would be used for the Republican National Convention, and that they did not support Trump.

=== Ann Dorn's speech ===
The daughters of David Dorn took objection to Ann Dorn, his widow, utilizing their father's death to support the candidacy of Trump, to whom they recalled their father being politically opposed.

== Impact ==
An August 30 ABC poll found no increase in Trump's favorability ratings following the convention. Further polling indicated that there had been virtually no convention bounce for either party. Some polling even showed Trump's favorability rating to have declined following the convention.

Ahead of, and during, the conventions, various outlets had speculated that significant convention bounces were unlikely for either party. This was due to several cited factors. One was that it had been observed that convention bounces had been more minuscule in recent elections. Per some calculations, convention bounces had averaged just 2 points since 2004, compared to just under 7 points between 1968 and 2000. Per other calculations, average bounces since 1996 averaged 3.6 points while bounces between 1962 and 1992 averaged 6.3 points. Another factor cited for why it was seen as unlikely for either party to generate a significant convention bounce in 2020 was that polls in the 2020 race had, in the months prior to the convention, shown a remarkably steady race, with Biden consistently holding an average lead of 6 points, exceeding a 10-point lead in some polls and never slipping below a lead of 4 points in the polling average. It has been shown that more stable races tend to see smaller convention bounces. Another was that the conventions, having been scaled-back due to the COVID-19 pandemic, were seen as less likely to generate as much attention as past conventions had, particularly due to the decrease in television viewership. Another was that the electorate was already strongly opinionated on the candidates, with more voters holding a strong opinion on Trump than any incumbent since at least 1980, and more voters holding a strong opinion on Biden than any challenger to an incumbent since at least 1980. Races where voters hold strong opinions on the candidates tend to see smaller convention bounces. Strong partisanship among the electorate was another cited factor.

== See also ==
- 2020 Republican Party presidential primaries
- 2020 Democratic National Convention
- 2020 Libertarian National Convention
- 2020 Green National Convention
- 2020 Constitution Party National Convention
- 2020 United States presidential election
- Impact of the COVID-19 pandemic on politics

Preceded by 2016; Cleveland, Ohio	Republican National Conventions	Succeeded by 2024; Milwaukee, Wisconsin
