= Mary Blanchard Lynde =

19th century American philanthropist

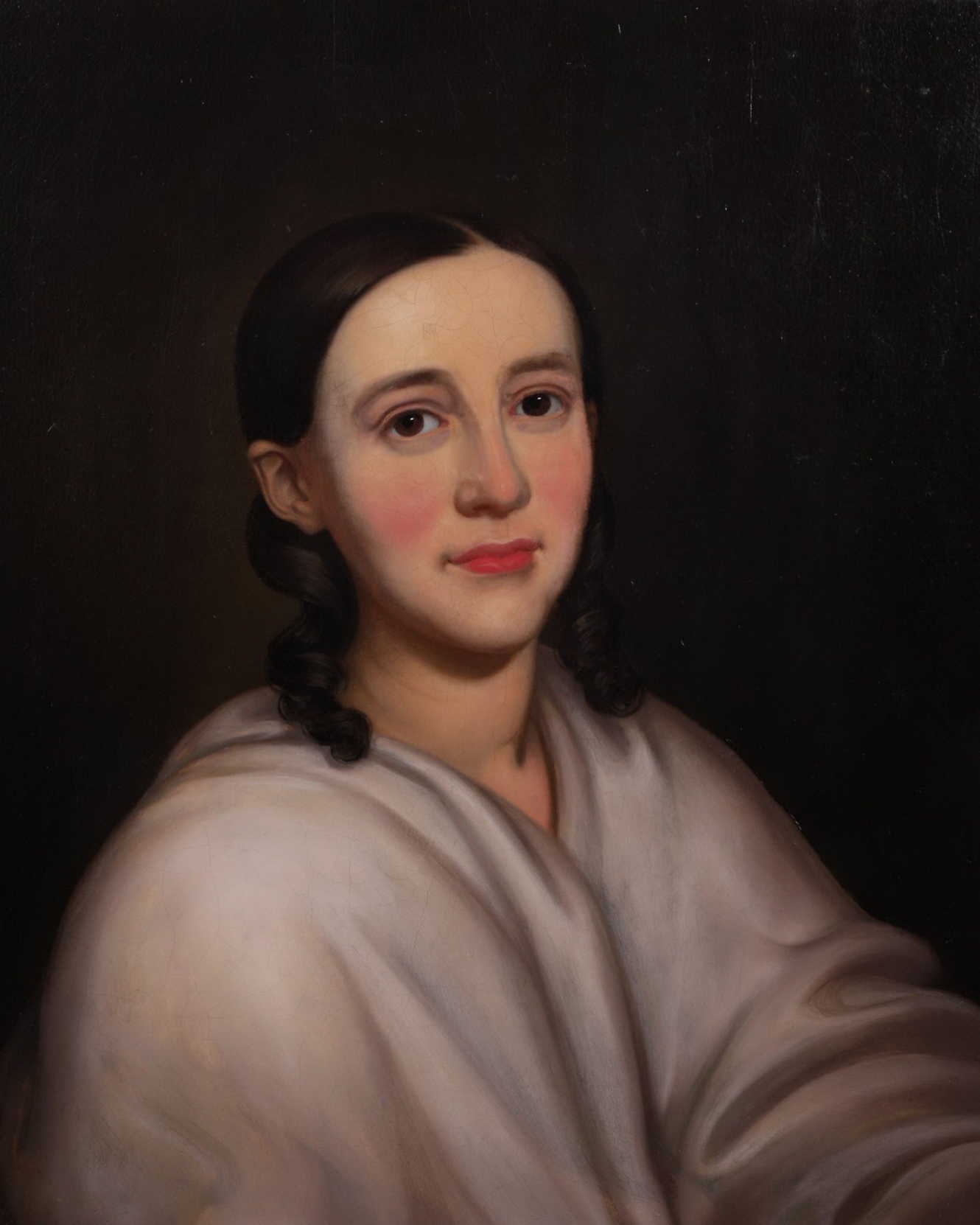
- Painted in oil by S.J. Robinson in Oct. 1847 when she was pregnant.
- Born: December 4, 1819; Truxton, New York, U.S.
- Died: June 26, 1897 (aged 77); Milwaukee, Wisconsin, U.S.
- Resting place: Forest Home Cemetery, Milwaukee
- Known for: Co-founder of Wisconsin Industrial School for Girls, first woman to receive a state office appointment in Wisconsin
- Spouse: William Pitt Lynde (m. 1841; died 1885)
- Children: Mary Elizabeth (Harper) (Baker)^{(b. 1842; died 1890)}; Clara Blanchard (Bradley)^{(b. 1844; died 1933)}; Fanny Lynde^{(b. 1846; died 1847)}; Eliza Warner (Crocker)^{(b. 1847; died 1924)}; William Pitt Lynde Jr.^{(b. 1852; died 1887)}; Tilly Lynde^{(b. 1853; died 1908)}; Azariel Blanchard Lynde^{(b. 1854; died 1889)}
- Relatives: Tilly Lynde (father-in-law); Lynde Bradley (grandson); Harry Lynde Bradley (grandson); Jane Bradley Pettit (great-granddaughter); Lynde Bradley Uihlein (great-great-granddaughter)

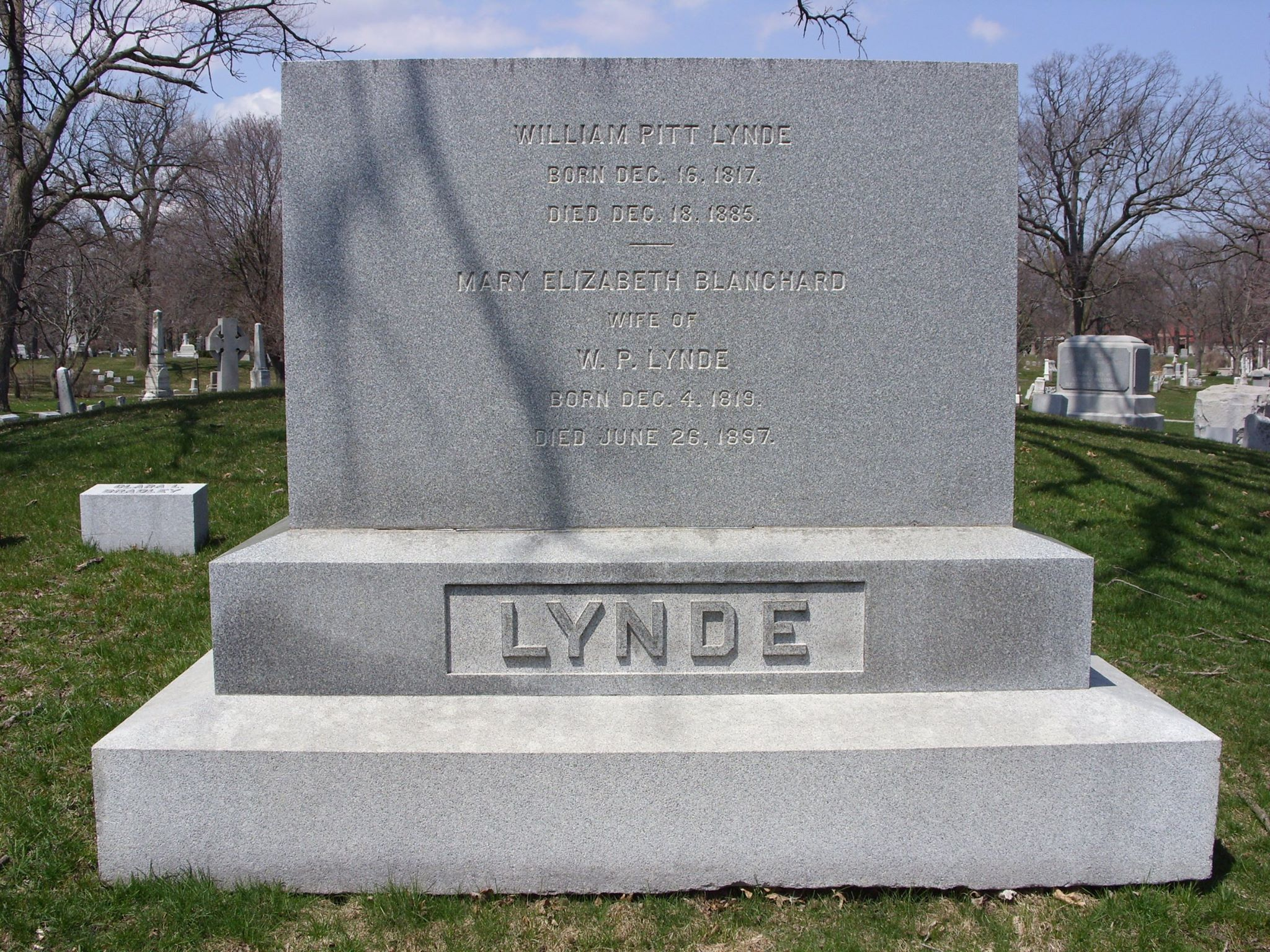
Memorial Gravestone for Mary Blanchard Lynde and her husband William Pitt Lynde

Mary Blanchard Lynde (December 4, 1819 – June 26, 1897) was an American philanthropist and social reformer, active in all of the progressive women's movements in Wisconsin. She was the co-founder of the Wisconsin Industrial School for Girls, and the first woman in Wisconsin to receive a state office appointment.

== Biography ==
Mary Elizabeth Blanchard was born in Truxton, New York, December 4, 1819. Her father was Azariel Blanchard. Her mother was Elizabeth Babcock, a native of South Kingstown, Rhode Island.

She was educated principally in the Albany Female Academy, where she was graduated in 1839, taking the first prize medal for composition, which was presented by the governor of the State, Hon. William H. Seward.

After marrying Hon. William Pitt Lynde, she spent most of her married life in Milwaukee, Wisconsin. The couple had at least six children.

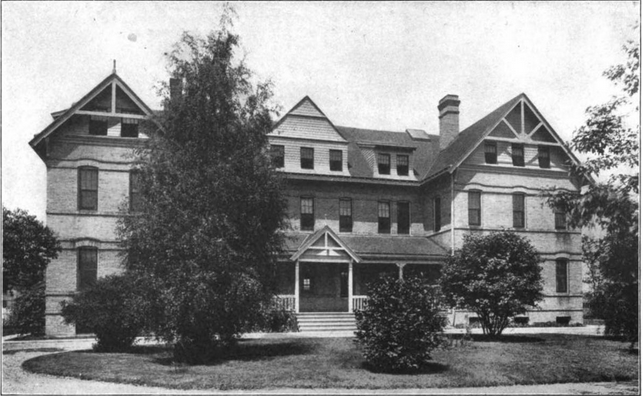
Lynde Cottage at Wisconsin Industrial School for Girls (1908)

In the 1850s, Lynde was a co-founder of Milwaukee's Ladies' Benevolent Society and in the beginning of the following decade, of the soldiers' aid society. In the 1880s, Lynde was a national leader on the issue of prison reform.

She was appointed a member of the Wisconsin State Board of Charities and Reforms, while Governor Lucius Fairchild was in office. She was the first woman to hold such a position. She spoke much in public, chiefly before legislative committees in behalf of charitable institutions, but also before State conventions of charities. She read papers in the meetings of the Association for the Advancement of Women in Chicago and Boston, and her ideas were so practical and forcible as to attract unusual attention. She was engaged in looking after the general interests of the Wisconsin Industrial School for Girls. She was also a member of the Woman's Board of Managers from Wisconsin to the 1893 World's Columbian Exposition.

Lynde died at her home in Milwaukee, June 26, 1897.

== Personal life and family ==
Mary Elizabeth Blanchard married William Pitt Lynde, of Sherburne, New York, on May 25, 1841. Lynde would go on to become a prominent lawyer and politician in Wisconsin, served three terms in the United States House of Representatives, and was the 12th mayor of Milwaukee.

William and Mary Lynde had at least seven children, though one died in infancy. There also seems to have been a pattern of mental illness in the family, as their eldest son spent the last months of his life in a mental institution and their youngest son died by suicide.

- Their eldest child, Mary Elizabeth "Lillie", married John Fletcher Harper, son of Joseph Wesley Harper, who was one of the Harper brothers who founded Harper & Brothers Publishing Company, one of the predecessors of HarperCollins. John F. Harper died in 1865, and Mary subsequently married Colgate Baker, a prosperous merchant. Mary used her wealth to open a school for women in San Francisco, California. Baker was one of America's largest tea importers in the 1880s, and the Bakers traveled frequently to Japan for business. Mary died during one such trip in 1890. Colgate Baker was also heavily invested in silver mines and was financially ruined by the Sherman Silver Purchase Act and the subsequent collapse in the value of silver.
- Their second child, Clara, married Henry Bradley. This marriage produced Lynde Bradley and Harry Lynde Bradley, who became two of the most important businessmen and philanthropists in Milwaukee's history, forming the Allen-Bradley Company and the Bradley Foundation. Harry Lynde Bradley's daughter Jane Bradley Pettit and granddaughter Lynde Bradley Uihlein have also played significant roles in Wisconsin's philanthropic history.
- Their third child, Fanny, died in infancy.
- Their fourth child, Eliza, married John Tweedy Crocker, the son of Hans Crocker, another mayor of Milwaukee and an important figure in the development of the city. John and Eliza moved to Chicago, where he worked for the Chicago, Milwaukee & St. Paul Railroad. Two of their daughters, Ruth and Gertrude, became prominent activists in the Congressional Union for Woman Suffrage.
- Their fifth child, William, Jr., graduated from Yale and began a business career, but struggled with mental illness. He was committed to the Northern Asylum in 1886 and died there in March 1887, at age 35.
- Their sixth child, Tilly, served on the Milwaukee city council, but lost most of his inheritance in stock speculation and gambling. After losing his fortune, he served as a deputy tax collector. He lived the longest of any of Lynde's sons, reaching the age of 55.
- Their seventh child, Azariel Blanchard Lynde, studied law in his father's office, but ultimately decided to become a doctor. He graduated from Rush Medical College in 1883, but only worked as a practicing physician for a few years before taking a leave of absence. He traveled for several years before coming to Duluth, Minnesota, where he committed suicide by slashing his own throat in August 1889. He was rumored to be a habitual user of opium.
