= Tilly Lynde =

19th century American politician

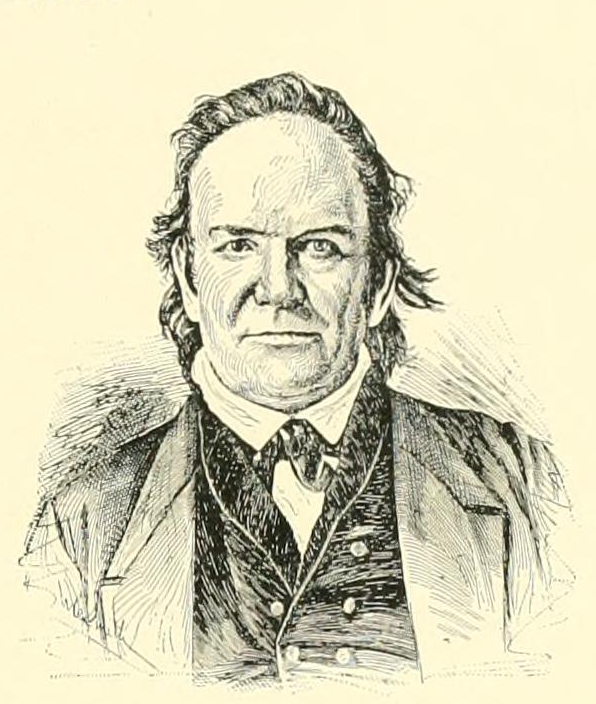
- From Souvenir of the Sherburne Centennial Celebration (1893)

Member of the New York Senate
- In office November 7, 1820 – January 1, 1826
Senate terms detail
In office January 1, 1823 – January 1, 1826 Serving with Samuel G. Hathaway (1823), Farrand Stranahan (1823–1824), Isaac Ogden (1823–1825), Latham A. Burrows (1824–1825), & Stukely Ellsworth (1825)
Preceded by	District created
Succeeded by	Peter Hager II
Constituency	6th Senate district
In office November 7, 1820 – January 1, 1823 Serving with Jabez D. Hammond (1820–1821), John Lounsbery (1820–1821), Moses Austin (1820–1822), William C. Bouck (1820–1822), Charles E. Dudley (1820–1822), John I. Miller (1820–1822), John T. More (1820–1822), William Ross (1820–1822), Abraham J. Hasbrouck (1822), & John L. Viele (1822)
Preceded by	John Noyes, Peter Swart, & Martin Van Buren
Succeeded by	District abolished
Constituency	Middle Senate district

Member of the New York State Assembly from the Chenango County district
- In office: July 1, 1817 – June 30, 1818; January 1, 1826 – January 1, 1827; January 1, 1828 – January 1, 1829
Assembly terms detail
In office January 1, 1828 – January 1, 1829 Serving with Henry Mitchell & Robert Monell
Preceded by	James Birdsall, Joseph Juliand, & Augustus C. Welch
Succeeded by	Russell Case, Abel Chandler, & Amos A. Franklin
In office January 1, 1826 – January 1, 1827 Serving with Robert Monell & John Tracy
Preceded by	Russell Case, Charles Medberry, & Robert Monell
Succeeded by	James Birdsall, Joseph Juliand, & Augustus C. Welch
In office July 1, 1817 – June 30, 1818 Serving with Perez Randall & Simon G. Throop
Preceded by	James Houghteling, Samuel A. Smith, & Ebenezer Wakley
Succeeded by	Obadiah German, Thomas Humphrey, & Ebenezer Wakley

Personal details
- Born: October 9, 1782 Brookfield, Massachusetts, U.S.
- Died: March 1, 1857 (aged 74) Brooklyn, New York, U.S.
- Resting place: Green-Wood Cemetery, Brooklyn
- Party: Democratic-Republican
- Spouse: Elizabeth Warner Lynde (died 1871)
- Children: Charles James Lynde^{(b. 1816; died 1841)}; William Pitt Lynde^{(b. 1817; died 1885)}; Watts Sherman Lynde^{(b. 1819; died 1841)}; Martius T. Lynde^{(b. 1825; died 1899)}
- Relatives: Charles W. Lynde (brother)
- Profession: Lawyer

Tilly Lynde (October 9, 1782 – March 1, 1857) was an American merchant, judge, and politician in the U.S. state of New York. He was a member of the New York State Senate (1820–1826) and the State Assembly (1818, 1826, & 1828).

His brother, Charles W. Lynde, also served several years in the New York Legislature. Two of Tilly Lynde's sons, Charles and Watts, died in the 1841 Erie steamship disaster. His eldest surviving son, William Pitt Lynde, became a prominent lawyer and politician in Milwaukee, Wisconsin, served three terms in the U.S. House of Representatives, and served as mayor of Milwaukee; William Lynde's descendants were also some of the most important businessmen and philanthropists in Milwaukee history.

== Biography ==
Tilly Lynde was born in Brookfield, Massachusetts, in October 1782. He moved to Sherburne, New York, in 1802, working as a clerk for the merchant Garret Y. Lansing. By December 1804, Lynde had earned enough to start his own general store. By all reports, he was extremely successful in business and within a decade was a prominent and well-known member of the community.

He was elected associate judge in 1816 and retired from his merchandise business. The following year, he was elected to the New York State Assembly as one of three representatives of Chenango County. He was defeated running for re-election in 1818, but was subsequently elected to the New York State Senate in 1820. He served in the 44th and 45th legislatures, the last sessions before the adoption of the 1822 New York Constitution. Under the new system, he was elected to a three year term in the New York Senate in 1822, representing the 6th State Senate district. He was then elected to two more terms in the Assembly, serving in the 1826 and 1828 sessions. He ran for United States House of Representatives in 1832, but was defeated.

He moved to Cortland, New York, in 1832, and later in life moved to Brooklyn, New York, where he lived with his youngest son. He died in Brooklyn on March 1, 1857.

== Personal life and family ==
Tilly Lynde was one of at least four children of John Lynde and his wife Sarah (née Warner). Tilly's younger brother, Charles W. Lynde, also served in the New York State Senate.

Tilly Lynde married Eliza Warner, a school teacher from Sunderland, Massachusetts, on September 10, 1812. They had four sons. Two of their sons, Charles and Watts, died along with 250 other passengers in the fire aboard the steamboat Erie, en route to Chicago in 1841.

Their eldest surviving son, William Pitt Lynde, moved to Milwaukee, Wisconsin Territory, where he became attorney general of the territory, then United States attorney. After Wisconsin achieved statehood, William Pitt Lynde was elected to three terms in the United States House of Representatives, and was elected mayor of Milwaukee in 1860. His grandsons Lynde Bradley and Harry Lynde Bradley became two of the most important businessmen in Milwaukee history, founding the Allen-Bradley Company and the Bradley Foundation. Lynde's descendants are still influential in Wisconsin business, philanthropy, and politics.

== Electoral history ==
=== New York Assembly (1817, 1818) ===
New York State Assembly, Chenango District Election, 1817
Party	Candidate	Votes	%	±%
General Election, April 1817 (vote for three)
Democratic-Republican	Perez Randall	1,145	34.27%	
Democratic-Republican	Tilly Lynde	1,144	34.24%	
Federalist	Simon G. Throop	1,052	31.49%	
Total votes		3,341	100.0%	

New York State Assembly, Chenango District Election, 1818
Party	Candidate	Votes	%	±%
General Election, April 1818 (vote for three)
Federalist	Ebenezer Wakley	1,402	34.27%	
Federalist	Thomas Humphrey	1,376	34.24%	
Federalist	Obadiah German	1,265	31.49%	
Democratic-Republican	Tilly Lynde (incumbent)	978	34.24%	
Democratic-Republican	Jarvis K. Pike	872	34.27%	
Democratic-Republican	Charles Medbury	688	31.49%	
Total votes		6,581	100.0%	+96.98%
Federalist gain from Democratic-Republican				

=== New York Senate (1820, 1822) ===
New York Senate, Middle District Election, 1820
Party	Candidate	Votes	%	±%
General Election, April 1820 (vote for three)
Democratic-Republican	William C. Bouck	11,809	17.27%	
Democratic-Republican	John I. Miller	11,807	17.27%	
Democratic-Republican	Tilly Lynde	11,802	17.26%	
Federalist	Joseph D. Monell	11,031	16.14%	
Federalist	Ebenezer Wakeley	10,952	16.02%	
Federalist	Jedediah Miller	10,955	16.02%	
	Scattering	10	0.01%	
Total votes		68,366	100.0%	

New York Senate, 6th District Election, 1822
Party	Candidate	Votes	%	±%
General Election, September 1822 (vote for four)
Democratic-Republican	Tilly Lynde	12,472	25.37%	
Democratic-Republican	Isaac Ogden	12,300	25.02%	
Democratic-Republican	Farrand Stranahan	12,067	24.55%	
Democratic-Republican	Samuel G. Hathaway	11,943	24.30%	
	Samuel G. Huntington	300	0.61%	
	Scattering	72	0.15%	
Total votes		68,366	100.0%	
Democratic-Republican win (new seat)				

New York State Assembly
Preceded by James Houghteling, Samuel A. Smith, & Ebenezer Wakley	Member of the New York State Assembly from the Chenango district July 1, 1817 – June 30, 1818; Served alongside: Perez Randall & Simon G. Throop	Succeeded by Obadiah German, Thomas Humphrey, & Ebenezer Wakley
Preceded by Russell Case, Charles Medberry, & Robert Monell	Member of the New York State Assembly from the Chenango district January 1, 1826 – January 1, 1827; Served alongside: Robert Monell & John Tracy	Succeeded by James Birdsall, Joseph Juliand, & Augustus C. Welch
Preceded by James Birdsall, Joseph Juliand, & Augustus C. Welch	Member of the New York State Assembly from the Chenango district January 1, 1828 – January 1, 1829; Served alongside: Henry Mitchell & Robert Monell	Succeeded by Russell Case, Abel Chandler, & Amos A. Franklin
New York State Senate
Preceded by John Noyes, Peter Swart, & Martin Van Buren	Member of the New York Senate from the Middle district November 7, 1820 – January 1, 1823; Served alongside: Jabez D. Hammond (1820–1821), John Lounsbery (1820–1821), Moses Austin (1820–1822), William C. Bouck (1820–1822), Charles E. Dudley (1820–1822), John I. Miller (1820–1822), John T. More (1820–1822), William Ross (1820–1822), Abraham J. Hasbrouck (1822), & John L. Viele (1822)	District abolished
District created	Member of the New York Senate from the 6th district January 1, 1823 – January 1, 1826; Served alongside: Samuel G. Hathaway (1823), Farrand Stranahan (1823–1824), Isaac Ogden (1823–1825), Latham A. Burrows (1824–1825), & Stukely Ellsworth (1825)	Succeeded by Peter Hager II
