= Senator Lynde =

Senator Lynde may refer to:

- Charles W. Lynde (1790–1860), New York State Senate
- Dolphus S. Lynde (1833–1902), New York State Senate
- William Pitt Lynde (1817–1885), Wisconsin State Senate

== See also ==
- James Lynd (1830–1862), Minnesota State Senate
