= William Pitt Lynde =

19th-century American politician, member of Congress, 12th mayor of Milwaukee

William P. Lynde
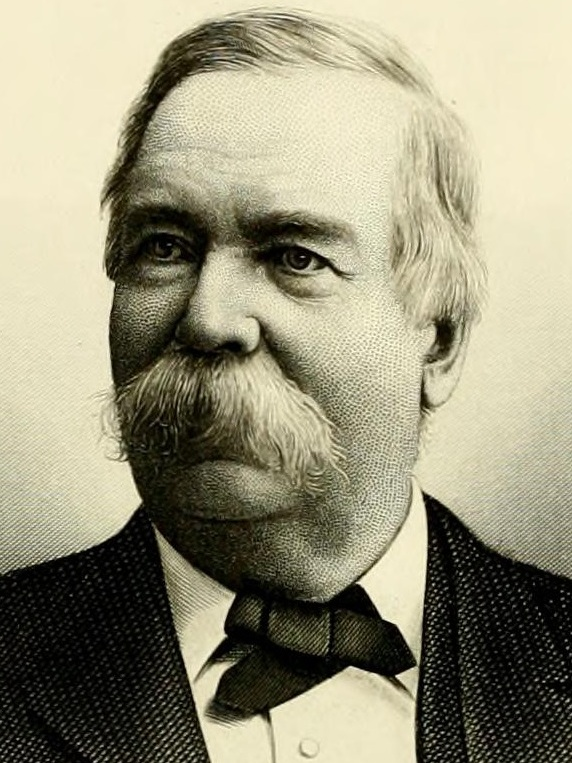

Member of the U.S. House of Representatives from Wisconsin
- In office March 4, 1875 – March 3, 1879
- Preceded by: Alexander Mitchell
- Succeeded by: Peter V. Deuster
- Constituency: 4th district
- In office June 5, 1848 – March 3, 1849
- Preceded by: district established
- Succeeded by: Charles Durkee
- Constituency: 1st district

12th Mayor of Milwaukee
- In office April 1860 – April 1861
- Preceded by: Herman L. Page
- Succeeded by: James S. Brown

Member of the Wisconsin Senate from the 5th district
- In office January 1, 1869 – January 1, 1871
- Preceded by: Henry L. Palmer
- Succeeded by: Francis Huebschmann

Member of the Wisconsin State Assembly from the Milwaukee 2nd district
- In office January 1, 1866 – January 1, 1867
- Preceded by: David Knab
- Succeeded by: Harrison Carroll Hobart

United States Attorney for the Wisconsin Territory
- In office July 14, 1845 – June 6, 1848
- President: James K. Polk
- Preceded by: Thomas W. Sutherland
- Succeeded by: Thomas W. Sutherland

4th Attorney General of the Wisconsin Territory
- In office 1844 – July 14, 1845
- Governor: Nathaniel P. Tallmadge
- Preceded by: Mortimer M. Jackson
- Succeeded by: Mortimer M. Jackson

Personal details
- Born: December 16, 1817 Sherburne, New York, US
- Died: December 18, 1885 (aged 68) Milwaukee, Wisconsin, US
- Resting place: Forest Home Cemetery; Milwaukee
- Party: Democratic
- Spouse: Mary Elizabeth Blanchard (m. 1841–1885)
- Children: Mary Elizabeth (Harper) (Baker)^{(b. 1842; died 1890)}; Clara Blanchard (Bradley)^{(b. 1844; died 1933)}; Fanny Lynde^{(b. 1846; died 1847)}; Eliza Warner (Crocker)^{(b. 1847; died 1924)}; William Pitt Lynde Jr.^{(b. 1852; died 1887)}; Tilly Lynde^{(b. 1853; died 1908)}; Azariel Blanchard Lynde^{(b. 1854; died 1889)}
- Parent: Tilly Lynde (father)
- Relatives: Charles W. Lynde (uncle); Lynde Bradley (grandson); Harry Lynde Bradley (grandson); Jane Bradley Pettit (great-granddaughter); Lynde Bradley Uihlein (great-great-granddaughter)
- Education: Yale College, Harvard Law School
- Profession: Lawyer

William Pitt Lynde (December 16, 1817 – December 18, 1885) was an American lawyer, Democratic politician, and Wisconsin pioneer. He was a member of the U.S. House of Representatives for three terms, representing Milwaukee and southeast Wisconsin in the 30th, 44th, and 45th congresses. He also served as the 12th mayor of Milwaukee, and, prior to Wisconsin statehood, he served as United States attorney and attorney general of the Wisconsin Territory. He was a co-founder of the law firm now known as Foley & Lardner, one of the oldest active law firms in the country.

His grandsons Lynde Bradley and Harry Lynde Bradley became two of the most important businessmen in Milwaukee history, founding the Allen-Bradley Company and the Bradley Foundation. Lynde's descendants are still influential in Wisconsin business, philanthropy, and politics.

== Early life and education ==
Lynde was born in Sherburne, New York, in December 1817. His father was a successful merchant and politician, which allowed William excellent education opportunities. He attended Cortland Academy in preparation for college, and then attended Colgate University. He finished his collegiate studies at Yale University, in 1838, and was chosen as valedictorian speaker at his commencement.

After graduating from Yale, he went on to attend New York University School of Law, but after one year he transferred to Harvard Law School. At Harvard, he studied under Joseph Story and Simon Greenleaf. He graduated in 1841, and that May, was admitted to the bar in New York.

Through his years at Yale and Harvard, he was also accompanied by his brothers Charles (1 year older) and Watts (2 years younger). They were reportedly very close, due to their shared upbringing and their shared years in education. Charles and William were both married around the same time, in 1841, and moved to Milwaukee, Wisconsin Territory, to begin their legal careers. But Charles and Watts both died just a few months later, in August 1841, in the destruction of the Erie steamboat.

== Wisconsin legal career ==
Shortly after his arrival in Wisconsin, Lynde started a law firm in partnership with Asahel Finch Jr., which continued for the rest of their lives. The firm endured without strife, despite the fact that Finch and Lynde were both active in politics and held opposing party affiliations. Their firm was originally known as Finch & Lynde, and from time to time included other partners as well. The firm continued to operate after the death of Finch in 1883 and Lynde in 1885, and continues today as the firm Foley & Lardner—one of the oldest and largest law firms in the country.

Lynde quickly became one of the most respected lawyers in Wisconsin, and for many years was president of the Milwaukee Bar Association. Lynde was often sought out by other lawyers to consult on their cases.

== Political career ==
Lynde was always among the progressive wing of the Democratic Party. Before the Civil War, he aligned with Stephen A. Douglas, and after the war, he was glad to see slavery abolished.

Just three years after his arrival in the Wisconsin Territory, he was appointed attorney general by the territory's governor Nathaniel P. Tallmadge. The next year he was appointed United States attorney, by U.S. President James K. Polk. Lynde advocated for adoption of the first constitution of Wisconsin in 1846 and 1847, but that document was rejected. After the second constitution of Wisconsin was ratified by voters in 1848, a new election was to be held for representatives to the 30th United States Congress, which still had nearly a year remaining. Lynde was chosen as the Democratic Party's candidate for congress in Wisconsin's 1st congressional district, which at that time comprised the southeast corner of the state. He prevailed in the May 1848 election, receiving 55% of the vote.

During 1848, Wisconsin was apportioned a third congressional seat and the Legislature drew new district lines. That fall, new elections were set to take place to choose representatives to the 31st United States Congress. Lynde stood for re-election in the new 1st congressional district. His law partner Asahel Finch stood as the Whig candidate in that race, and Charles Durkee, another friend of Lynde, ran as the Free Soil candidate. The vote split fairly evenly between the three men, but Durkee prevailed with 38%.

Lynde's next major election was his run for Wisconsin Supreme Court in 1859. Feelings about the election were closely tied to people's feelings about the United States Supreme Court decision in Ableman v. Booth, which struck down an anti-slavery ruling of the Wisconsin Supreme Court. Lynde, as the Democratic candidate, was on the wrong side of that partisan divide. The election turned out to be quite close, but the results were tainted by irregularities which led the board of canvassers to throw out nearly 40,000 votes—roughly a third of all the votes cast. In the end, Byron Paine won the election by a margin of just 2,145 votes.

Lynde was elected to the Milwaukee City Council in 1850 and was elected mayor of Milwaukee in 1860. Throughout the American Civil War, Lynde paid the $300 draft deferment fee for a large number of recent German immigrants, and earned vast popularity and support from Milwaukee's German community.

In 1865, he was elected to the Wisconsin State Assembly, representing Milwaukee County's 2nd Assembly district. In 1868, he was elected to a two-year term in the Wisconsin State Senate. During the 1869 and 1870 sessions, he represented Wisconsin's 5th State Senate district, then comprising roughly the northern half of Milwaukee County.

== Return to Congress ==
In 1874, the Democratic Party in Wisconsin was in the midst of a coalition with liberal republicans and grangers, known as the Reform Party. At the Reform Party nominating convention for Wisconsin's 4th congressional district, Samuel Rindskopf, a liquor dealer and an officer in the state liquor dealers' association, won the Reform Party nomination. The liquor association was advocating strongly and spending significantly to try to repeal or modify the hated Graham Liquor Law, which had placed limits on alcohol sales in Wisconsin. Throughout the summer, papers took note of the odd bedfellows in Rindskopf's camp, which included past temperance advocates. It later became known that Rindskopf had spent a reported $20,000 (about $520,000 adjusted for inflation to 2022) to buy support from journalists and convention delegates.

The corruption of the nominating process and the apparently poor character of the nominees led to a crisis in the party membership, with party members openly saying they would support the Republican, Harrison Ludington, rather than Rindskopf. The final straw came when journalists began to question whether Rindskopf met the citizenship requirements to run for Congress. Finally, a collection of leading Democrats apparently compelled Rindskopf to abandon the race, just two weeks before the election. The outgoing congressman Alexander Mitchell, and other prominent Democrats called on Lynde to step in as the Democratic nominee, and he was unanimously ratified by the district caucus in a special session held on October 20, 1874.

After the bitter nominating process, many newspapers were dismissive of Lynde's chances against Ludington, who was then mayor of Milwaukee and quite popular. But Lynde managed to rally sufficient support and prevailed with 55% of the general election vote. He went on to win re-election in 1876.

In the House, Lynde served on the Judiciary Committee and was one of the House managers for the impeachment of Secretary of War William W. Belknap.

In 1878, Lynde faced a primary challenge from Peter V. Deuster, a German immigrant who operated several partisan newspapers. Lynde ultimately stood down, and Deuster took the nomination at the September convention.

== Later years ==
Lynde remained active in the Democratic Party after leaving Congress but was wary of new populist movements within the party associated with the rising labor and greenback movements.

He remained active in his law firm until his death. He died suddenly on December 18, 1885, at his home in Milwaukee. He had been sick for a year but was not thought to be in critical condition. He was interred in Milwaukee's historic Forest Home Cemetery. His wife died in 1897 and was also interred there.

== Personal life and family ==
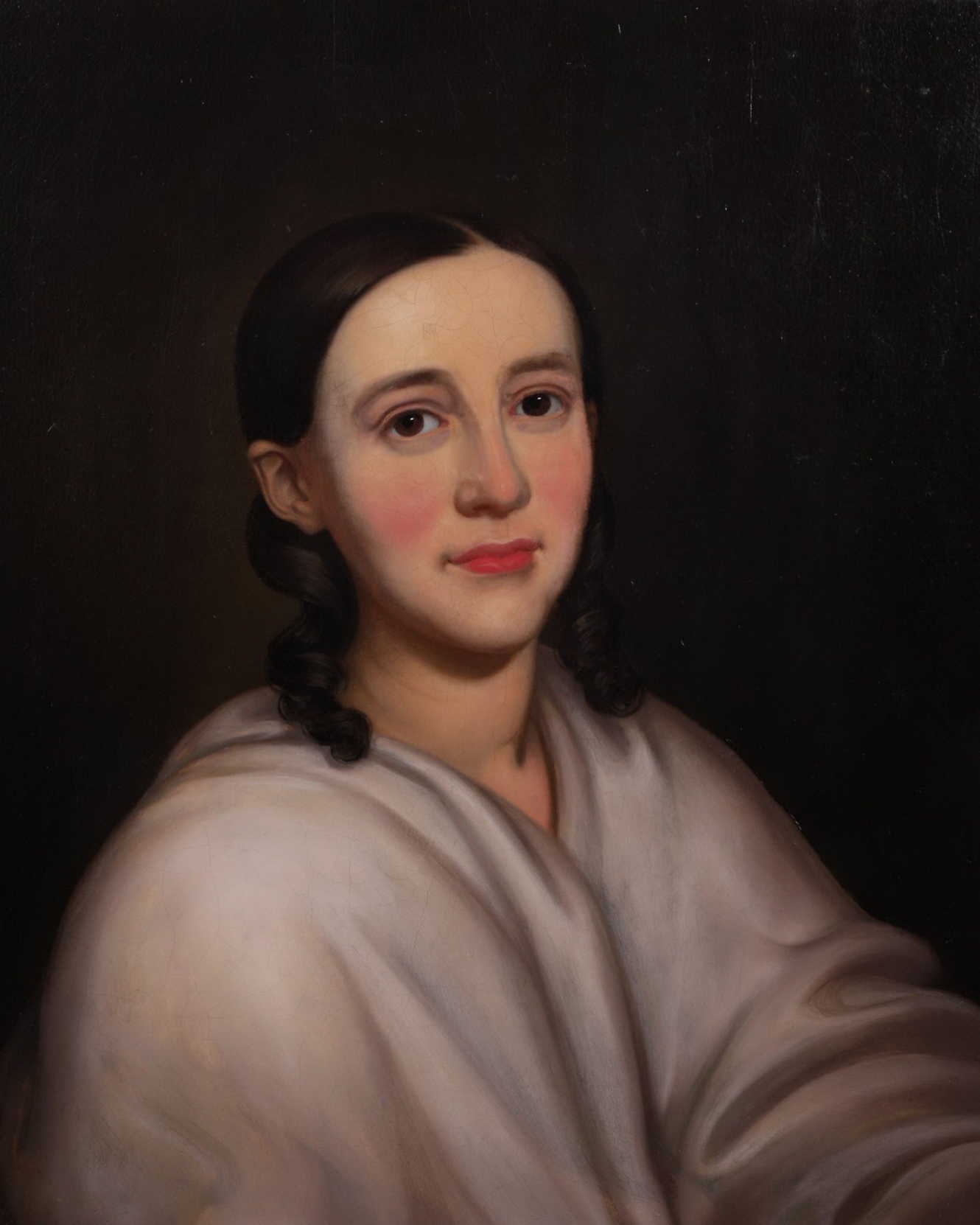
Portrait of Lynde's wife, Mary Blanchard Lynde, in Oct. 1847, by S.J. Robinson.

William Pitt Lynde was the second of four sons born to Tilly Lynde and his wife, Elizabeth (née Warner). Tilly Lynde was a prosperous merchant in Sherburne, New York, and served several years in the New York State Senate and New York State Assembly. Tilly's brother, Charles W. Lynde, also prospered in business in Sherburne and served in the New York Senate.

The Lynde family were descendants of Deacon Thomas Lynde, who emigrated from England to Charlestown, Massachusetts Bay Colony, about 1634.

Two of William's brothers, Charles J. Lynde and Watts S. Lynde, died in the Erie steamship disaster in August 1841.

William Pitt Lynde married Mary Elizabeth Blanchard, of Truxton, New York, on May 25, 1841. Mary Blanchard Lynde became a famous philanthropist and social reform advocate and was the first woman ever appointed to an office of the Wisconsin state government. She was appointed to the Wisconsin State Board of Charities and Reform by Governor Lucius Fairchild when that organization was first authorized in 1871.

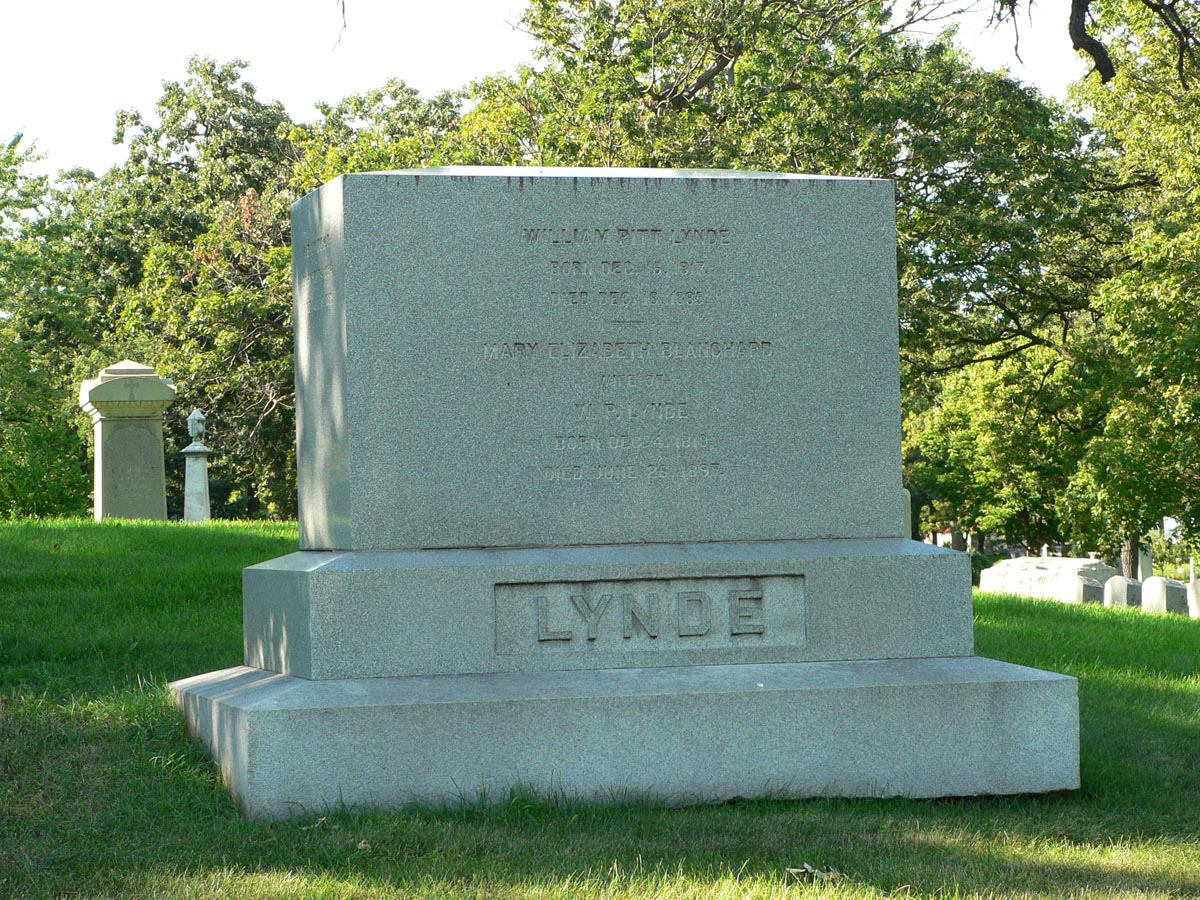
Gravesite in Forest Home Cemetery

William and Mary Lynde had at least seven children, though one died in infancy. There also seems to have been a pattern of mental illness in the family, as their eldest son spent the last months of his life in a mental institution and their youngest son died by suicide.

- Their eldest child, Mary Elizabeth "Lillie", married John Fletcher Harper, son of Joseph Wesley Harper, who was one of the Harper brothers who founded Harper & Brothers Publishing Company, one of the predecessors of HarperCollins. John F. Harper died in 1865, and Mary subsequently married Colgate Baker, a prosperous merchant. Mary used her wealth to open a school for women in San Francisco, California. Baker was one of America's largest tea importers in the 1880s, and the Bakers traveled frequently to Japan for business. Mary died during one such trip in 1890. Colgate Baker was also heavily invested in silver mines and was financially ruined by the Sherman Silver Purchase Act and the subsequent collapse in the value of silver.
- Their second child, Clara, married Henry Bradley. This marriage produced Lynde Bradley and Harry Lynde Bradley, who became two of the most important businessmen and philanthropists in Milwaukee's history, forming the Allen-Bradley Company and the Bradley Foundation. Harry Lynde Bradley's daughter Jane Bradley Pettit and granddaughter Lynde Bradley Uihlein have also played significant roles in Wisconsin's philanthropic history.
- Their third child, Fanny, died in infancy.
- Their fourth child, Eliza, married John Tweedy Crocker, the son of Hans Crocker, another mayor of Milwaukee and an important figure in the development of the city. John and Eliza moved to Chicago, where he worked for the Chicago, Milwaukee & St. Paul Railroad. Two of their daughters, Ruth and Gertrude, became prominent activists in the Congressional Union for Woman Suffrage.
- Their fifth child, William Jr., graduated from Yale and began a business career, but struggled with mental illness. He was committed to the Northern Asylum in 1886 and died there in March 1887, at age 35.
- Their sixth child, Tilly, served on the Milwaukee city council, but lost most of his inheritance in stock speculation and gambling. After losing his fortune, he served as a deputy tax collector. He lived the longest of any of Lynde's sons, reaching the age of 55.
- Their seventh child, Azariel Blanchard Lynde, studied law in his father's office, but ultimately decided to become a doctor. He graduated from Rush Medical College in 1883 but only worked as a practicing physician for a few years before taking a leave of absence. He traveled for several years before coming to Duluth, Minnesota, where he committed suicide by slashing his own throat in August 1889. He was rumored to be a habitual user of opium.

== Electoral history ==
=== U.S. House (1848) ===
Wisconsin's 1st Congressional District Special Election, 1848
Party	Candidate	Votes	%	±%
Special Election, May 8, 1848
Democratic	William Pitt Lynde	9,834	54.89%	
Whig	Edward V. Whiton	7,387	41.23%	
Liberty	Ichabod Cotting	696	3.88%	
Plurality		2,447	13.66%	
Total votes		17,917	100.0%	
Democratic win (new seat)				

Wisconsin's 1st Congressional District Election, 1848
Party	Candidate	Votes	%	±%
General Election, November 7, 1848
Free Soil	Charles Durkee	5,038	38.49%	
Democratic	William Pitt Lynde (incumbent)	4,436	33.89%	−21.00%
Whig	Asahel Finch Jr.	3,615	27.62%	
Plurality		602	4.60%	
Total votes		13,089	100.0%	-26.95%
Whig gain from Democratic				

=== Wisconsin Supreme Court (1859) ===
Wisconsin Supreme Court Election, 1859
Party	Candidate	Votes	%	±%
General Election, April 5, 1859
Republican	Byron Paine	40,500	51.36%	
Democratic	William Pitt Lynde	38,355	48.64%	
Plurality		2,145	2.72%	
Total votes		78,855	100.0%	
Republican gain from Democratic				

=== Milwaukee Mayor (1860) ===
Milwaukee Mayoral Election, 1860
Party	Candidate	Votes	%	±%
General Election, April 3, 1860
Democratic	William Pitt Lynde	4,532	55.90%	
Democratic	Otis H. Waldo	3,552	43.81%	
	Scattering	24	0.30%	
Plurality		980	12.09%	
Total votes		8,108	100.0%	
Democratic hold				

=== U.S. House (1874, 1876) ===
Wisconsin's 4th Congressional District Election, 1874
Party	Candidate	Votes	%	±%
General Election, November 3, 1874
Democratic	William Pitt Lynde	12,046	55.79%	−9.31%
Republican	Harrison Ludington	9,545	44.21%	
Plurality		2,501	11.58%	
Total votes		21,591	100.0%	+5.83%
Democratic hold				

Wisconsin's 4th Congressional District Election, 1876
Party	Candidate	Votes	%	±%
General Election, November 7, 1876
Democratic	William Pitt Lynde (incumbent)	17,653	59.63%	+3.84%
Republican	William E. Smith	11,952	40.37%	
Plurality		5,701	19.26%	+7.67%
Total votes		29,605	100.0%	+37.12%
Democratic hold				

Wisconsin Senate
Preceded by Henry L. Palmer	Member of the Wisconsin Senate from the 5th district 1869 – 1871	Succeeded by Francis Huebschmann
U.S. House of Representatives
New district	Member of the U.S. House of Representatives from Wisconsin's 1st congressional district June 5, 1848 – March 3, 1849	Succeeded by Charles Durkee
Preceded by Alexander Mitchell	Member of the U.S. House of Representatives from Wisconsin's 4th congressional district March 4, 1875 – March 3, 1879	Succeeded by Peter V. Deuster
Political offices
Preceded by Herman L. Page	Mayor of Milwaukee, Wisconsin; 1860 – 1861	Succeeded by James S. Brown
Legal offices
Preceded by Mortimer M. Jackson	Attorney General of the Wisconsin Territory; 1844 – 1845	Succeeded by Mortimer M. Jackson
Preceded by Thomas W. Sutherland	United States Attorney for the Wisconsin Territory; 1845 – 1848	Succeeded by Thomas W. Sutherland
