= Jump drive =

Jump drive may refer to:

- USB flash drive, a data storage device
- Hyperspace drive, a fictional space travel method
