= Hyperspace =

Faster-than-light travel in science fiction

Hyperspace travel is sometimes depicted as a starfield that streaks toward the viewer. A visual effect like this was first used in the 1974 film Dark Star, and it became a popular cinematic depiction, with a similar effect being used in the Star Wars franchise.

In science fiction, hyperspace (also known as nulspace, subspace, overspace, jumpspace and similar terms) is a concept relating to higher dimensions as well as parallel universes and a faster-than-light (FTL) method of interstellar travel. In its original meaning, the term hyperspace was simply a synonym for higher-dimensional space (that is, higher than three dimensional space). This usage was most common in 19th-century textbooks and is still occasionally found in academic and popular science texts, for example, Hyperspace (1994). Its science fiction usage originated in the magazine Amazing Stories Quarterly in 1931 and within several decades it became one of the most popular tropes of science fiction, popularized by its use in the works of authors such as Isaac Asimov and E. C. Tubb, and media franchises such as Star Wars.

One of the main reasons for the concept's popularity in science fiction is the impossibility of faster-than-light travel in ordinary physical space, which hyperspace allows writers to bypass. In most works, hyperspace is described as a higher dimension through which the shape of three-dimensional space can be distorted to bring distant points close to each other, similar to the concept of a wormhole; or a shortcut-enabling parallel universe that can be travelled through. Usually it can be traversed – the process often known as "jumping" – through a gadget known as a "hyperdrive"; rubber science is sometimes used to explain it. Many works rely on hyperspace as a convenient background tool enabling FTL travel necessary for the plot, with a small minority making it a central element in their storytelling. While most often used in the context of interstellar travel, a minority of works focus on other plot points, such as the inhabitants of hyperspace, hyperspace as an energy source, or even hyperspace as the afterlife.

== Concept ==
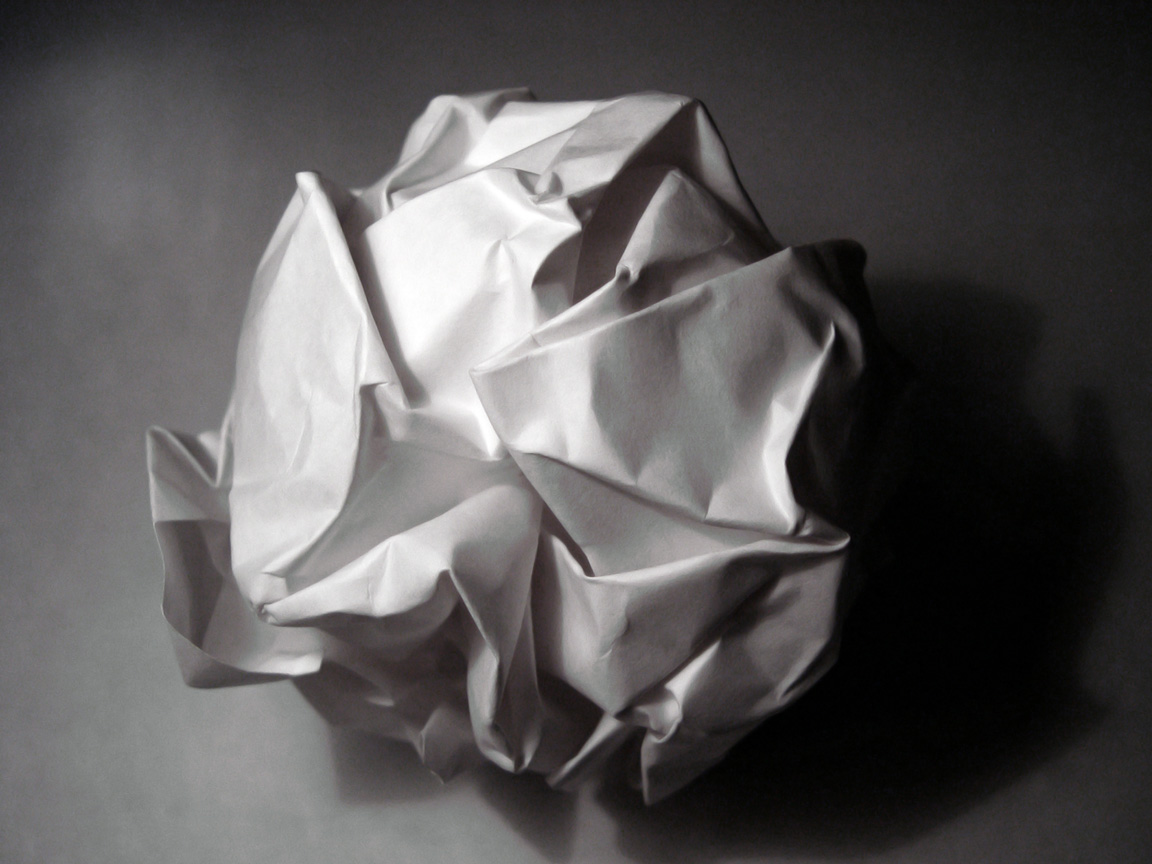
A piece of paper crumpled into a ball, representing a two-dimensional object distorted in the third dimension, making points that are far apart on its surface come close to each other or even touch

The basic premise of hyperspace is that vast distances through space can be traversed quickly by taking a kind of shortcut. There are two common models used to explain this shortcut: folding and mapping. In the folding model, hyperspace is a place of higher dimension through which the shape of our three-dimensional space can be distorted to bring distant points close to each other; a common analogy popularized by Robert A. Heinlein's Starman Jones (1953) is that of crumpling two-dimensional paper or cloth in the third dimension, thus bringing points on its surface into contact. In the mapping model, hyperspace is a parallel universe much smaller than ours (but not necessarily the same shape), which can be entered at a point corresponding to one location in ordinary space and exited at a different point corresponding to another location after travelling a much shorter distance than would be necessary in ordinary space. The Science in Science Fiction compares it to being able to step onto a world map at one's current location, walking across the map to a different continent, and then stepping off the map to find oneself at the new location—noting that the hyperspace "map" could have a significantly more complicated shape, as in Bob Shaw's Night Walk (1967).

Hyperspace is generally seen as a fictional concept not compatible with present-day scientific theories, particularly the theory of relativity. (Note: The theory of relativity prohibits the principle of causality being broken by the reversal of cause and effect, which the very concept of FTL travel breaks as the arrival of an object using FTL means of travel, such as hyperspace, might be witnessed by observers elsewhere in the Universe as preceding the take-off.) Some science fiction writers attempted quasi-scientific rubber science explanations of this concept. For others, however, it is just a convenient MacGuffin enabling faster-than-light travel necessary for their story without violating the prohibitions against FTL travel in ordinary space imposed by known laws of physics.

=== Terminology ===
The means of accessing hyperspace is often called a "hyperdrive", and navigating hyperspace is typically referred to as "jumping" (as in "the ship will now jump through hyperspace").

A number of related terms (such as imaginary space, Jarnell intersplit, jumpspace, megaflow, N-Space, nulspace, slipstream, overspace, Q-space, subspace, and tau-space) have been used by various writers, although none have gained recognition to rival that of hyperspace. Some works use multiple synonyms; for example, in the Star Trek franchise, the term hyperspace itself is only used briefly in a single 1988 episode ("Coming of Age") of Star Trek: The Next Generation, while a related set of terms – such as subspace, transwarp, and proto-warp – are employed much more often, and most of the travel takes place through the use of a warp drive. Hyperspace travel has also been discussed in the context of wormholes and teleportation, which some writers consider to be similar whereas others view them as separate concepts.

== History ==
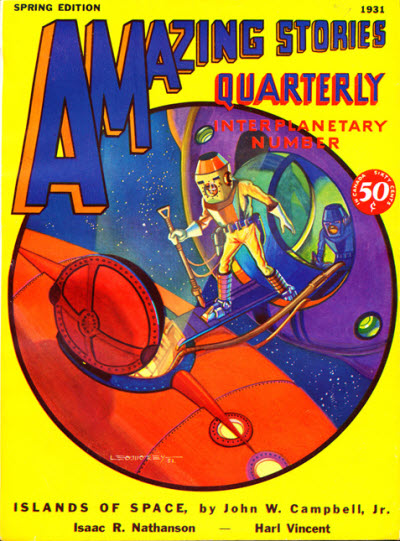
The earliest references to hyperspace in fiction appeared in publications such as Amazing Stories Quarterly (shown here is the Spring 1931 issue featuring John Campbell's Islands of Space).

Emerging in the early 20th century, within several decades hyperspace became a common element of interstellar space travel stories in science fiction. Kirk Meadowcroft's "The Invisible Bubble" (1928) and John Campbell's Islands of Space (1931) feature the earliest known references to hyperspace, with Campbell, whose story was published in the science fiction magazine Amazing Stories Quarterly, likely being the first writer to use this term in the context of space travel. According to the Historical Dictionary of Science Fiction, the earliest known use of the word "hyper-drive" comes from a preview of Murray Leinster's story "The Manless Worlds" in Thrilling Wonder Stories 1946.

Another early work featuring hyperspace was Nelson Bond's The Scientific Pioneer Returns (1940). Isaac Asimov's Foundation series, first published in Astounding starting in 1942, featured a Galactic Empire traversed through hyperspace through the use of a "hyperatomic drive". In Foundation (1951), hyperspace is described as an "...unimaginable region that was neither space nor time, matter nor energy, something nor nothing, one could traverse the length of the Galaxy in the interval between two neighboring instants of time." E. C. Tubb has been credited with playing an important role in the development of hyperspace lore, writing a number of space operas in the early 1950s in which space travel occurs through that medium. He was also one of the first writers to treat hyperspace as a central part of the plot rather than a convenient background gadget that just enables the faster-than-light space travel.

In 1963, Philip Harbottle called the concept of hyperspace "a fixture" of the science fiction genre, and in 1977 Brian Ash wrote in The Visual Encyclopedia of Science Fiction that it had become the most popular of all faster-than-light methods of travel. The concept would subsequently be further popularized through its use in the Star Wars franchise.

In the 1974 film Dark Star, special effects designer Dan O'Bannon created a visual effect to depict going into hyperspace wherein the stars in space appear to move rapidly toward the camera. This is considered to be the first depiction in cinema history of a ship making the jump into hyperspace. The same effect was later employed in Star Wars (1977) and the "star streaks" are considered one of the visual "staples" of the Star Wars franchise.

== Characteristics ==
Hyperspace is typically described as chaotic and confusing to human senses; often at least unpleasant – transitions to or from hyperspace can cause symptoms such as nausea, for example – and in some cases even hypnotic or dangerous to one's sanity. Visually, hyperspace is often left to the reader's imagination, or depicted as "a swirling gray mist". In some works, it is dark. Exceptions exist; for example, John Russel Fearn's Waters of Eternity (1953) features hyperspace that allows observation of regular space from within.

Many stories feature hyperspace as a dangerous, treacherous place where straying from a preset course can be disastrous. In Frederick Pohl's The Mapmakers (1955), navigational errors and the perils of hyperspace are one of the main plot-driving elements, and in K. Houston Brunner's Fiery Pillar (1955), a ship re-emerges within Earth, causing a catastrophic explosion. In some works, travelling or navigating hyperspace requires not only specialized equipment, but physical or psychological modifications of passengers or at least navigators, as seen in Frank Herbert's Dune (1965), Michael Moorcock's The Sundered Worlds (1966), Vonda McIntyre's Aztecs (1977), and David Brin's The Warm Space (1985).

While generally associated with science fiction, hyperspace-like concepts exist in some works of fantasy, particularly ones which involve movement between different worlds or dimensions. Such travel, usually done through portals rather than vehicles, is usually explained through the existence of magic.

== Use ==
While mainly designed as means of fast space travel, occasionally, some writers have used the hyperspace concept in more imaginative ways, or as a central element of the story. In Arthur C. Clarke's "Technical Error" (1950), a man is laterally reversed by a brief accidental encounter with "hyperspace". In Robert A. Heinlein's Glory Road (1963) and Robert Silverberg's "Nightwings" (1968), it is used for storage. In George R.R. Martin's FTA (1974) hyperspace travel takes longer than in regular space, and in John E. Stith's Redshift Rendezvous (1990), the twist is that the relativistic effects within it appear at lower velocities. Hyperspace is generally unpopulated, save for the space-faring travellers. Early exceptions include Tubb's Dynasty of Doom (1953), Fearn's Waters of Eternity (1953) and Christopher Grimm's Someone to Watch Over Me (1959), which feature denizens of hyperspace. In The Mystery of Element 117 (1949) by Milton Smith, a window is opened into a new "hyperplane of hyperspace" containing those who have already died on Earth, and similarly, in Bob Shaw's The Palace of Eternity (1969), hyperspace is a form of afterlife, where human minds and memories reside after death. In some works, hyperspace is a source of extremely dangerous energy, threatening to destroy the entire world if mishandled (for instance Eando Binder's The Time Contractor from 1937 or Alfred Bester's "The Push of a Finger" from 1942). The concept of hyperspace travel, or space folding, can be used outside space travel as well, for example in Stephen King's short story "Mrs. Todd's Shortcut" it is a means for an elderly lady to take a shortcut while travelling between two cities.

In many stories, a starship cannot enter or leave hyperspace too close to a large concentration of mass, such as a planet or star; this means that hyperspace can only be used after a starship gets to the outside edge of a solar system, so that it must use other means of propulsion to get to and from planets. Other stories require a very large expenditure of energy in order to open a link (sometimes called a jump point) between hyperspace and regular space; this effectively limits access to hyperspace to very large starships, or to large stationary jump gates that can open jump points for smaller vessels. Examples include the "jump" technology in Babylon 5 and the star gate in Arthur C. Clarke's 2001: A Space Odyssey (1968). Just as with the very concept of hyperspace, the reasons given for such restrictions are usually technobabble, but their existence can be an important plot device. Science fiction author Larry Niven published his opinions to that effect in N-Space. According to him, an unrestricted FTL technology would give no limits to what heroes and villains could do. Limiting the places a ship can appear in, or making them more predictable, means that they will meet each other most often around contested planets or space stations, allowing for narratively satisfying battles or other encounters. On the other hand, a less restricted hyperdrive may also allow for dramatic escapes as the pilot "jumps" to hyperspace in the midst of battle to avoid destruction. In 1999 science fiction author James P. Hogan wrote that hyperspace is often treated as a plot-enabling gadget rather than as a fascinating, world-changing item, and that there are next to no works that discuss how hyperspace has been discovered and how such discovery subsequently changed the world.

== See also ==
- Minkowski space
- Teleportation in fiction
- Wormholes in fiction
- Warp (video games)
