= Mary Blanchard =

Mary Blanchard may refer to:

- Mary Blanchard Lynde (1819–1897), American philanthropist and social reformer
- Mary Hazelton Blanchard Wade (née Mary Blanchard, 1860–1936), American writer

== Fictional characters ==
- Mary Margaret Blanchard, in the US fantasy adventure drama TV series Once Upon a Time, played by Ginnifer Goodwin and Bailee Madison
