= Wisconsin Industrial School for Girls =

Girls school for delinquent and uncared for

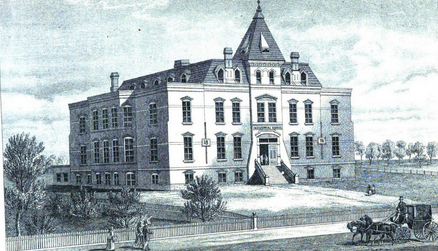
- Wisconsin Industrial School for Girls, Milwaukee
- Milwaukee, Wisconsin; United States

Information
- Type: Reform school
- Established: 1875
- Closed: 1976
- Gender: Female

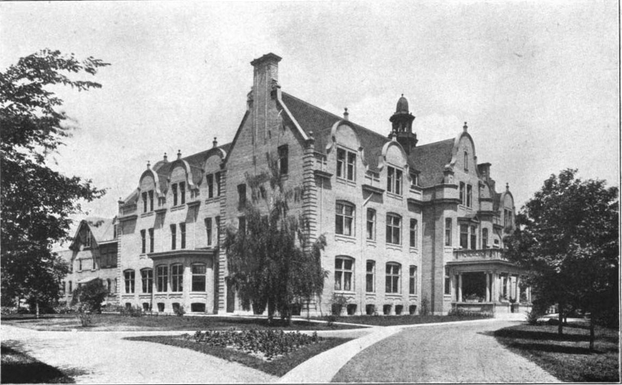
Administration Building and Main Home

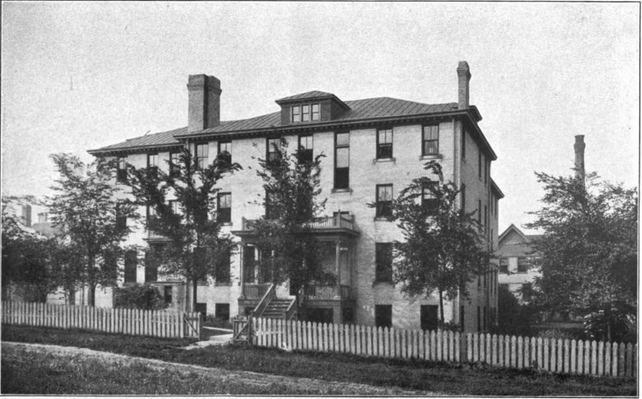
Russell Cottage

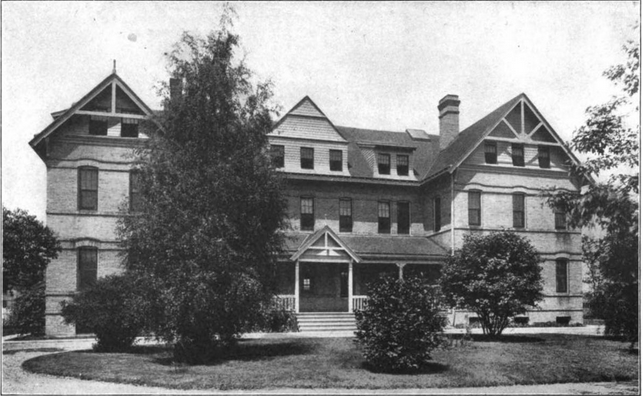
Lynde Cottage

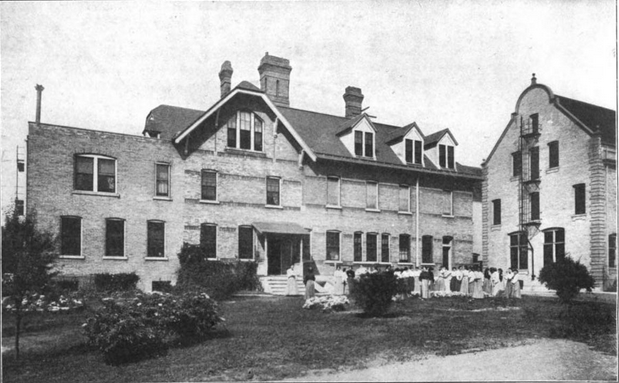
Cottage Annex

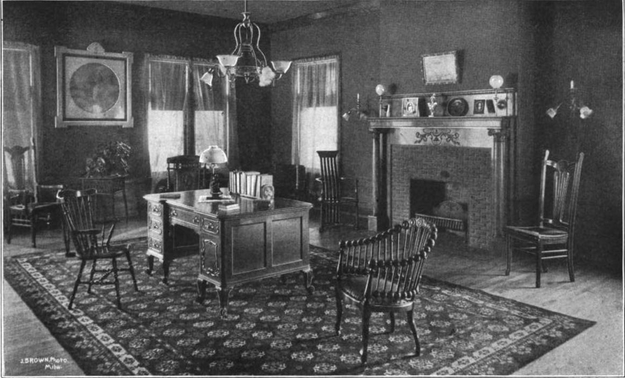
Merrill Modern Home Library

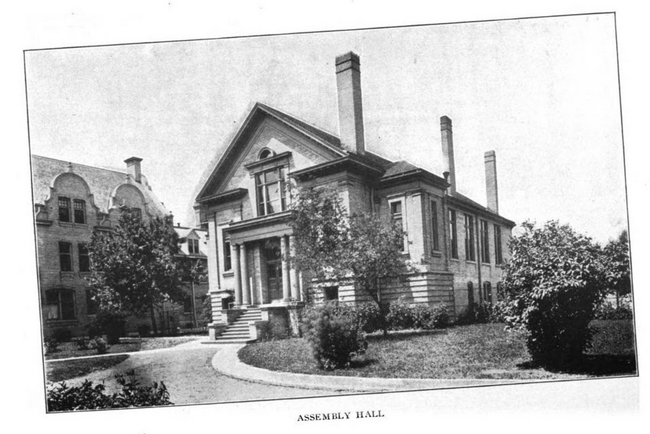
Assembly Hall

Wisconsin Industrial School for Girls (formerly, Milwaukee Industrial School) was a 19th-century American reform school in Milwaukee, Wisconsin. The Wisconsin Industrial School for Girls was the only secular reformatory institution in the state where delinquent and neglected girls could make a home. The school's purpose was the prevention of crime and pauperism of unfortunate girls; and the restoration of those who had fallen into bad habits, or inherited vicious tendencies. The system of discipline and education was adapted to the condition and needs of the pupils. There were several buildings associated with the school, including the Main Building, Russell Cottage, Lynde Cottage, Cottage Annex, Merrill Model Home, Assembly Hall, Steward's Home, Steam Heating Plant and Barn

In 1875, an act was passed providing for the establishment of industrial schools for criminal, vagrant, and deserted children. The children would be committed by the courts. Plans were made for the "Milwaukee Industrial School". The Legislature of 1878 authorised $15,000 for the erection of a school building and the city supplied an 8 acres (3.2 ha) site worth $16,000 at 465 Lake Drive overlooking the Bay of Milwaukee. The school was named the Milwaukee Industrial School; but as it received inmates from every part of the state the name was changed to the Wisconsin Industrial School for Girls. Boys under the age of ten years, only, were admitted.

== History ==
=== Establishment ===
The necessity of establishing an industrial school, which should have for its aim and object the reformation of vagrant children, and children who were permitted to wander in the streets as beggars, and those whose condition would naturally lead to vice and crime, had been a matter of much thought to the ladies of the city of Milwaukee for many months, and various plans had been proposed and discussed for the accomplishment of that object when the winter of 1874 set in. The unusual severity of that winter and the depression of business whereby so many men and women were thrown out of employment, had the effect to increase largely the number of vagrant children in the streets of Milwaukee, and proved to be the occasion for adopting active and decisive measures.

In February, 1875, a meeting of the women of Milwaukee was called to discuss the feasibility of establishing an industrial school similar to others in operation in the U.S. and other countries. An organization was created, but was soon found to be of little practical benefit, owing to the want of cooperative legislative action on the subject. To meet this need, a bill was introduced into the legislature of the state of Wisconsin, entitled "An act authorizing Industrial Schools," which passed both houses, was duly approved by the governor, and became a law on April 5, 1875.

The organization which had instituted this work immediately took steps to organize in pursuance of the law, and became a corporation in April of the same year. A building and lot were rented at once, in a central part of the city, and preparations were made to enable the corporation to carry out the purpose of the law. Scarcely, however, had it received into its care some of the children for whose reformation and protection the law was intended, when certain parties not in sympathy with the movement claimed that the law was unconstitutional, and took steps to test its validity.

The question of the validity of the law arose in this way: Certain children were taken from the poor house of Milwaukee County, by virtue of the law and the order of the court, and were placed in the custody and under the control of the Industrial School. A bill was presented to the board of supervisors of Milwaukee County for payment of the expenses of caring for such children. The board of supervisors declined to pay the bill, on the ground that the law was unconstitutional. Thereupon an application was made by the corporation for a writ of mandamus against the board of supervisors, to compel the payment of the bill as rendered. The counsel of the corporation think there is no doubt of the validity of the law, and that the board of supervisors will be ordered by the court to pay the bill. Should that feature of the law, however, which requires the board of supervisors to pay the expenses of children taken from the poor house, be declared invalid, it will not, as the corporation is advised, impair or affect other provisions of the law.

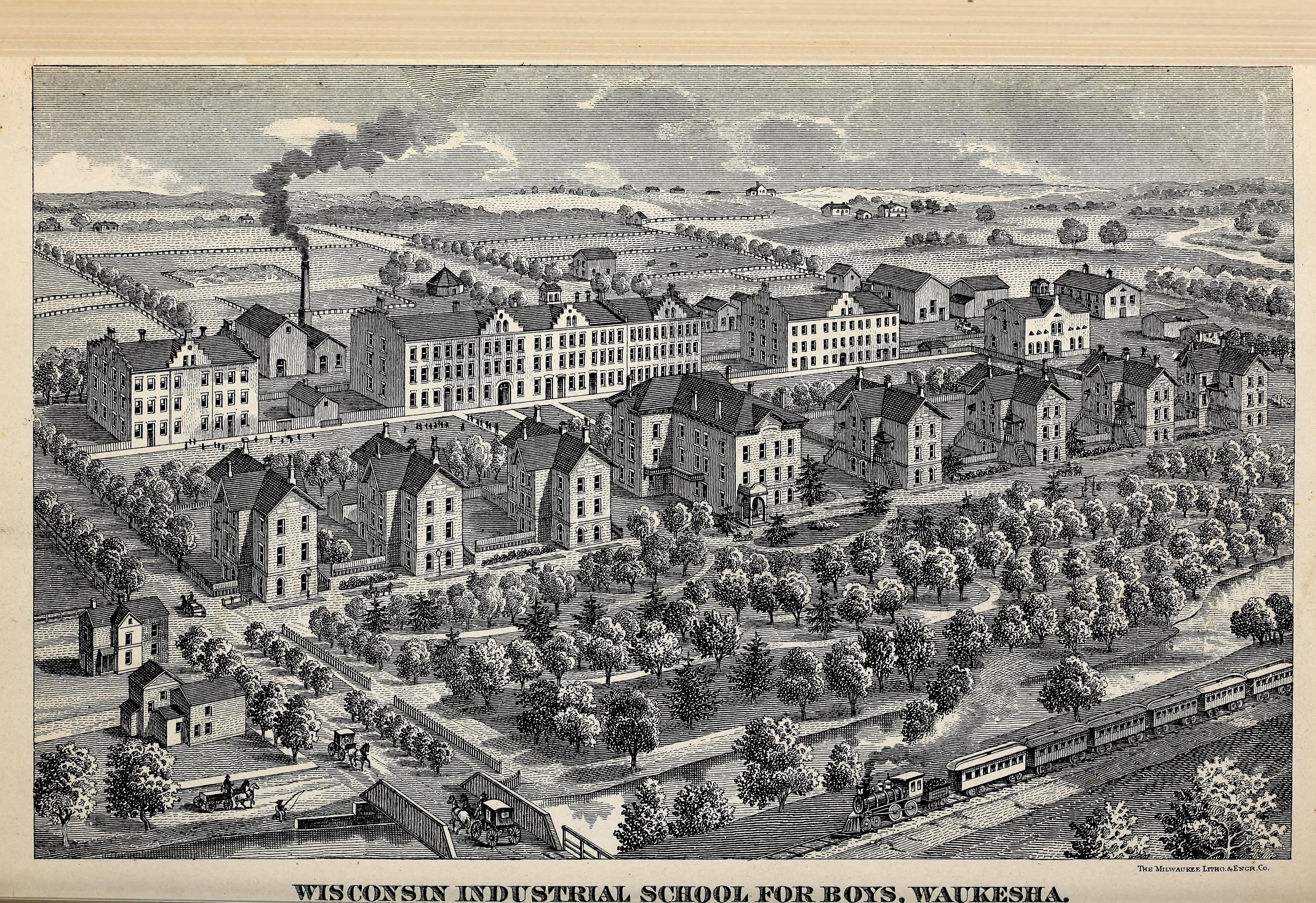
Industrial school for boys in Waukesha, picture published 1893

The Milwaukee Industrial School was the only reformatory institution for girls in the state. It looked not only to the people of Milwaukee, but to the state at large, for the necessary means to carry out successfully the purpose of its organization. An Industrial School for Boys was already established in the state, in which boys 10 years old and upwards were received.

There was a steady increase in the number of resident inmates of the Milwaukee Industrial School, and the demand for accommodation already began to tax the capabilities of the building. The corporation was largely dependent upon voluntary contributions, and was in need of state aid. Fifty-nine children were received into the institution during the first 10 months of its existence.

In 1876, the cash receipts have amounted to three thousand, five hundred and thirty-seven dollars, and the disbursements have been three thousand and sixty-two dollars.

=== Move to Oregon ===
State funding was intermittent over the years and the managers often felt it inadequate. By 1917 the buildings in Milwaukee were deteriorating and considered a fire hazard, so the state took over, but the legislature was reluctant to sink more money into the old buildings. Ten years later, in 1928, the legislature finally approved $400,000 for a new facility. After considering various sites, the Board of Control bought a 405 acre farm near Oregon, ten miles south of Madison. This was felt a good site because of nearby medical and educational facilities in Madison and because the farm would provide wholesome activities for the girls and allow them to produce some of their own food, reducing operating costs.

The new facility was designed as a "cottage" institution, where instead of a massive dormitory, the residents lived in smaller cottages, closer to traditional homes. Each cottage housed 21 girls in their own rooms and four matrons who would oversee them, with a kitchen, a dining room, a laundry, a sewing room, and a cloths room. Exterior walls were clad in lannon stone and roofs were covered with red clay tile. Floors were terrazzo. By 1932 ten of these cottages were built on the farm at Oregon, but funds had been exhausted. As the country slid into the Depression the state couldn't allocate more money. The new facility sat largely idle until 1939, when Frank Klode rejoined the Board of Control and pushed for completion of the facility at Oregon. The state legislature funded enough to build a functioning facility scaled down from the original plan: the administration and assembly buildings were combined and one of the existing cottages was made into a receiving building and infirmary. In June 1941 the old school in Milwaukee closed and 94 girls and the staff moved to the new facility in Oregon. Soon after, the school's name was changed to The Wisconsin School for Girls.

In following years, the facility served older girls, and their stays became shorter. In 1973 boys were included to provide a more normal social environment. But the 1970s also saw a trend of moving people from institutions out into the community, and occupancy declined making the facility less efficient. In 1976 all juveniles were transferred to other facilities, and the school at Oregon was converted to Oakhill Correctional Institute - a minimum-security prison for men.

== Student restrictions ==
Girls were eligible to attend the schools if they met the following qualifications:

- Girls under 18 years of age, who were beggars, vagrants, ragpickers or wanderers, or were destitute because of orphanage, or abandonment, or having a parent undergoing imprisonment, or otherwise without means of support.
- Girls under the above age who were found in circumstances of manifest danger of falling into habits of vice, or who had fallen.
- The form of commitment should be considered a civil rather than a criminal process. Parents, guardians, supervisors or grand jurors could present a formal complaint to a judge of probate, or of the criminal or municipal court of any city or county, or to any justice of the peace of the town where the child was found, who thereupon took cognizance of and determined the case.
- In addition to the girls sent by legal process, the school received, boarded and taught girls for parents or guardians, on their paying the same sum as was paid by the counties for those committed by the courts.

== Notable people ==
Mary Blanchard Lynde (1819 -1897), president, was the founder. She was known for her belief that science could solve society's problems. She had founded the local Ladies' Benevolent Society and in the 1860s she founded the Soldiers Aid Society. She was married to William Pitt Lynde who was a politician and she would use the name "Mrs Wm. P. Lynde". Electa Amanda Wright Johnson was another one of the founders, and for many years its secretary; later still, she was an active member of its board of managers.

The officers of the corporation were: Mrs. Wm. P. Lynde, President; Miss Mary Mortimer, 1st Vice President; Mrs. E. P. Allis, 2nd Vice President; Mrs. Edward Sanderson, 3rd Vice President; Mrs. C. D. Adsit, Treasurer; Mrs. H. M. Finch, Secretary. The Executive Committee was composed of Mrs. Joseph E. Follett, Mrs. A. C. May, Mrs. W. G. Benedict. The board of managers consisted entirely of women who volunteered to assist with managing the school. The staff consisted of the matron, a teacher and two assistants.

== Architecture ==
The form of the main building at Milwaukee was a parallelogram, 60 by 82 feet (18 m × 25 m) exclusive of an extension at each end in octagonal form, measuring 4 by 22 feet (1.2 m × 6.7 m), and a one-story addition in the rear for laundry and cellar purposes, 18 by 48 feet (5.5 m × 14.6 m). It was three stories high above the basement. The building afforded ample accommodation for 200 pupils, plus teachers, resident officers, and assistants. The house was well ventilated, and provision was made for warming it. It was substantially built of Milwaukee brick upon a limestone foundation. The facilities enabled the managers to provide the inmates with an education, full knowledge of housekeeping, and industrial training in order to earn a living.

The buildings were designated as the Main Building, Russell Cottage, Lynde Cottage, Cottage Annex, Merrill Model Home, Assembly Hall, Steward's Home, Steam Heating Plant and Barn. The Main Home was for incorrigible girls, and young girls who needed the care and protection of the school. The cottages were entirely separate buildings affording restraint and influence over unchaste girls. The Merrill Model Home was for those girls who attained the Honor Grade. In this department special training was given to prepare for parole or dismissal on majority.
