= Electa Amanda Wright Johnson =

American philanthropist (1838–1929)

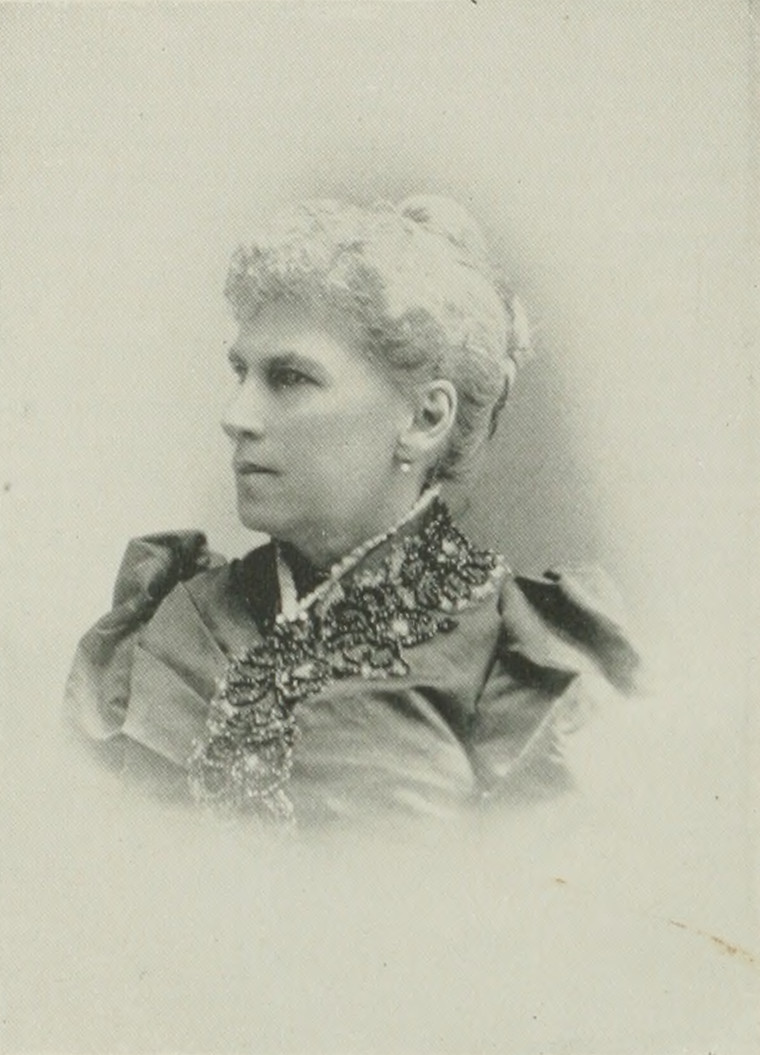
- "A Woman of the Century"
- Born: Electa Amanda Wright; November 13, 1838; Arcadia, New York, U.S.
- Died: January 17, 1929 (aged 90); New York, U.S.
- Occupations: philanthropist; writer
- Known for: co-founder, Wisconsin Industrial School for Girls
- Spouse: Daniel Harris Johnson (m. 1860; died 1900)

Electa Amanda Wright Johnson (née, Wright; November 13, 1838 – January 17, 1929) was an American philanthropist. She was one of the founders of the Wisconsin Industrial School for Girls, and was selected by the governor of Wisconsin several times to represent the state on the questions of charity and reform. Johnson wrote essays, short stories, and sketches of travel for the daily papers of Milwaukee.

== Early life and education ==
Electa Amanda Wright was born in the town of Arcadia, New York, November 13, 1838. Her father, Bezaleel Wright Jr. (1796–1878), was from a family that had fought in the American Revolution, and her mother, Catharina Kipp (1799–1863), came from an old Knickerbocker family. She was a descendant of Bezaleel Wright, who served in Captain Abijah Child's company, Colonel Thomas Gardner's regiment, at the siege of Boston.

While she was still a child, her parents moved west and settled near Madison, Wisconsin. She attended neighborhood schools and finished high school in Madison.

== Career ==
Johnson became a successful teacher in Madison.

On September 24, 1860, at Madison, she married Daniel Harris Johnson, a lawyer of Prairie du Chien, Wisconsin. In 1862, she and her husband settled in Milwaukee, where he became a Wisconsin Circuit Court judge. They had one child, a daughter, Kate (1861–1892).

Early on, she directed her attention to works of charity and reform. She was one of the founders of the Wisconsin Industrial School for Girls, was for many years its secretary, and later still, an active member of its board of managers.

Several times, Johnson was commissioned by the Governor of Wisconsin to represent the State in the national conferences of charities and reforms. In that capacity, she participated in their deliberations in Washington, D.C., Louisville, Kentucky, St. Louis, Missouri, Madison, Wisconsin, and San Francisco, California.

She was involved in the associated charities of Milwaukee, strongly favoring efforts to aid and encourage others to become self-supporting, rather than mere almsgiving. She was an active member and was for two years corresponding secretary of the Women's Club of Wisconsin. She was not a professional literary woman, but she wrote short articles and brief stories for publication, and numerous papers to be read before the societies, conferences, clubs and classes with which she was affiliated. Johnson was a member of the Daughters of the American Revolution.

== Death ==
Electa Amanda Wright Johnson died in New York, January 17, 1919.

== Selected works ==
- "The Wisconsin industrial school", Milwaukee Monthly, v. 11, 1876, pp. 118–120.
- "Milwaukee home for the friendless", Milwaukee Monthly, pp. 246–250.
