= Rockwell Automation Headquarters and Allen-Bradley Clock Tower =

Office building located in Milwaukee, Wisconsin, USA

Coordinates: 43.018603°N 87.912640°W

Allen-Bradley Building
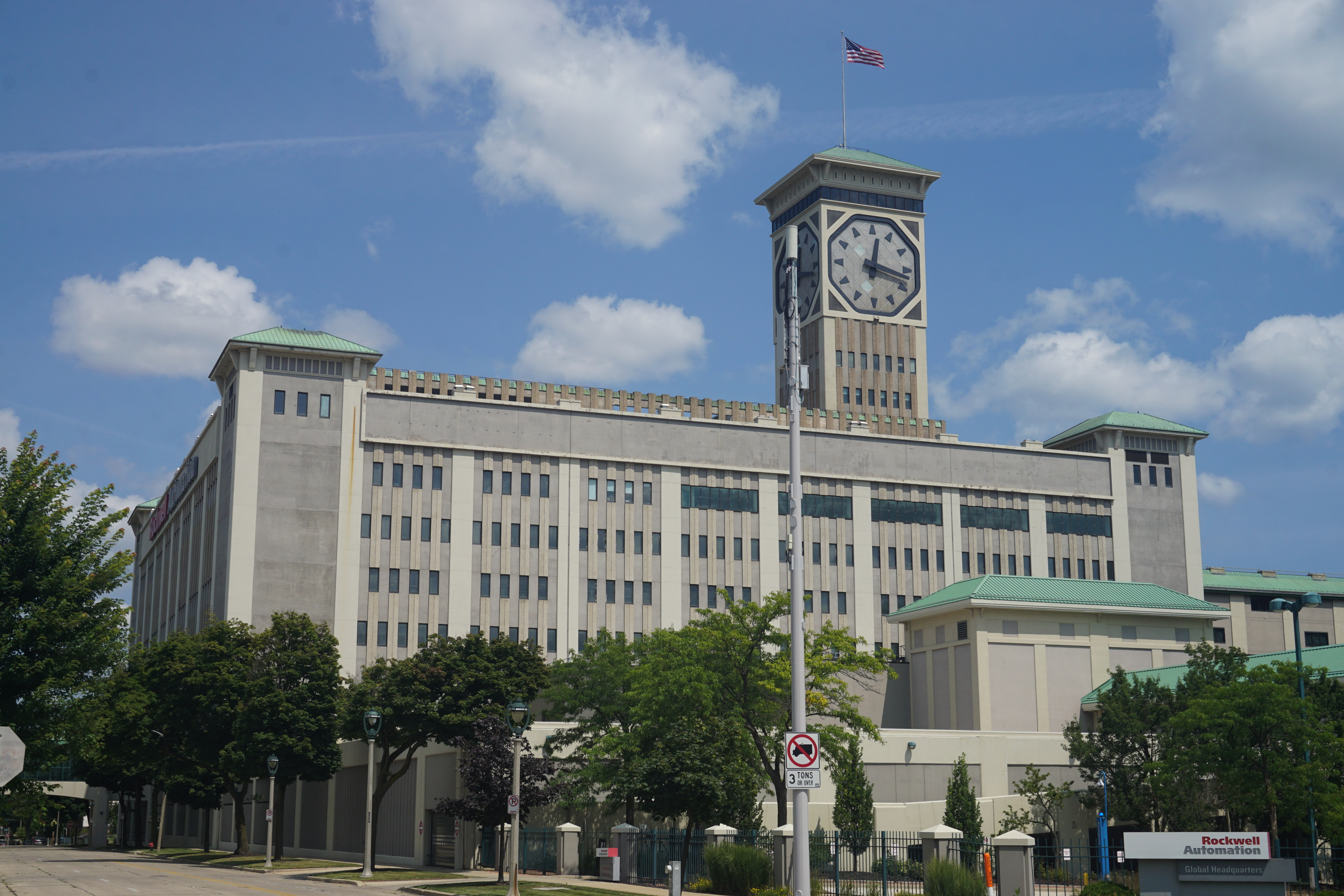
- Interactive map of the Allen-Bradley Building area

General information
- Architectural style: International Style
- Location: Milwaukee, Wisconsin, United States of America
- Completed: 1962
- Client: Allen-Bradley

Design and construction
- Architect: Fitzhugh Scott

Other information
- Public transit: MCTS

The Rockwell Automation Headquarters is an office building located in Milwaukee, Wisconsin. The building is known for once having the largest four-faced clock in the world.

== Clock Tower ==
=== History ===
The Allen-Bradley Clock Tower, owned by Allen-Bradley, a product brand of Rockwell Automation, has long been a landmark in Milwaukee. According to the Guinness Book of World Records: "The largest four-faced clock is that on the research and office addition of the Allen-Bradley Company. Each face has a diameter of 40 feet 3 1/2 inches (12.28 meters), and is octagonal to represent the outline of the Allen-Bradley logo. Dedicated on October 31, 1962, it rises 280 ft (85 m) from the streets of Milwaukee, and requires 34.6 kilowatts of electricity for lighting and power." It has since been surpassed by the 141 ft (43 m) clock faces of the Abraj Al Bait.

The original plan for the clock tower date as far back as 1959, when it appears on early drawings for the proposed addition. Created by architect Fitzhugh Scott, the plans included several towers in its design, only one of which would house a clock. This was scaled back, however a smaller tower on an existing building was kept and modified to display the outdoor temperature using a large digital display. The interest in creating the tower was Harry Bradley, younger of the firm's two founding brothers. An inventor, Bradley including in his tinkering several of the clocks which he owned.

The Clock Tower's lighted faces have been used as a navigation aid for Lake Michigan mariners over the years, except during the 1973 oil crisis when the clock was unlit from November 1973 to June 1974.

The clock tower is referred to by the nickname "the Polish Moon", due to its large lit white faces and location on Milwaukee's southside neighborhood which was developed by Polish immigrants to the city during the 20th century.

=== Clock size ===
The current clock tower stands at 280 ft (85 m). Because the octagonal faces are nearly twice the size of the faces of London's Big Ben, chimes were never added in an attempt to allow Big Ben to remain the largest four-faced chiming clock in the world. In fact, that title has belonged to the Minneapolis City Hall clock since 1909. Each hour hand of the Allen-Bradley Clock Tower is 15.8 feet (4.8 m) long and weighs 490 pounds (220 kg). Each minute hand is 20 feet (6.1 m) long and weighs 550 pounds (250 kg). The hour markings are 4 feet (1.2 m) high.

=== Appearance in popular culture ===
The tower made an appearance on the NASCAR Busch Series race car of Mike Bliss in 2004. To celebrate Rockwell Automation and Allen-Bradley's 100-year association, the #20 Rockwell Automation car was painted black with gold accents, along with the Rockwell/Allen-Bradley 100 Years symbol on the hood and quarter panels. The Clock Tower was depicted on the car in front of the wheel well. In Season 1, Episode 3 of Apple TV series Ted Lasso, the title character references spending three hours and 42 minutes alone at the clock tower.

== See also ==
- Abraj Al Bait
- Big Ben
- List of tallest buildings in Milwaukee
