= Turbo encabulator =

Fictional electromechanical machine

The turbo encabulator is a fictional electromechanical machine with a satirical technobabble description that became a famous in-joke among engineers after a report about it by John Quick was published by the British Institution of Electrical Engineers in their Students' Quarterly Journal in 1944. Technical documentation has been written for the non-existent machine, and there are a number of parody marketing videos.

...The original machine had a base-plate of prefamulated amulite, surmounted by a malleable logarithmic casing in such a way that the two main spurving bearings were in a direct line with the pentametric fan. The latter consisted simply of six hydrocoptic marzlevanes, so fitted to the ambifacient lunar waneshaft that side fumbling was effectively prevented. The main winding was of the normal lotus-o-delta type placed in panendermic semi-boloid slots in the stator, every seventh conductor being connected by a non-reversible tremie pipe to the differential girdlespring on the "up" end of the grammeters...

— John Hellins Quick, 2nd paragraph of "The turbo-encabulator in industry", Students' Quarterly Journal, Vol. 15, Iss. 58, p. 22 (December 1944)

== History ==
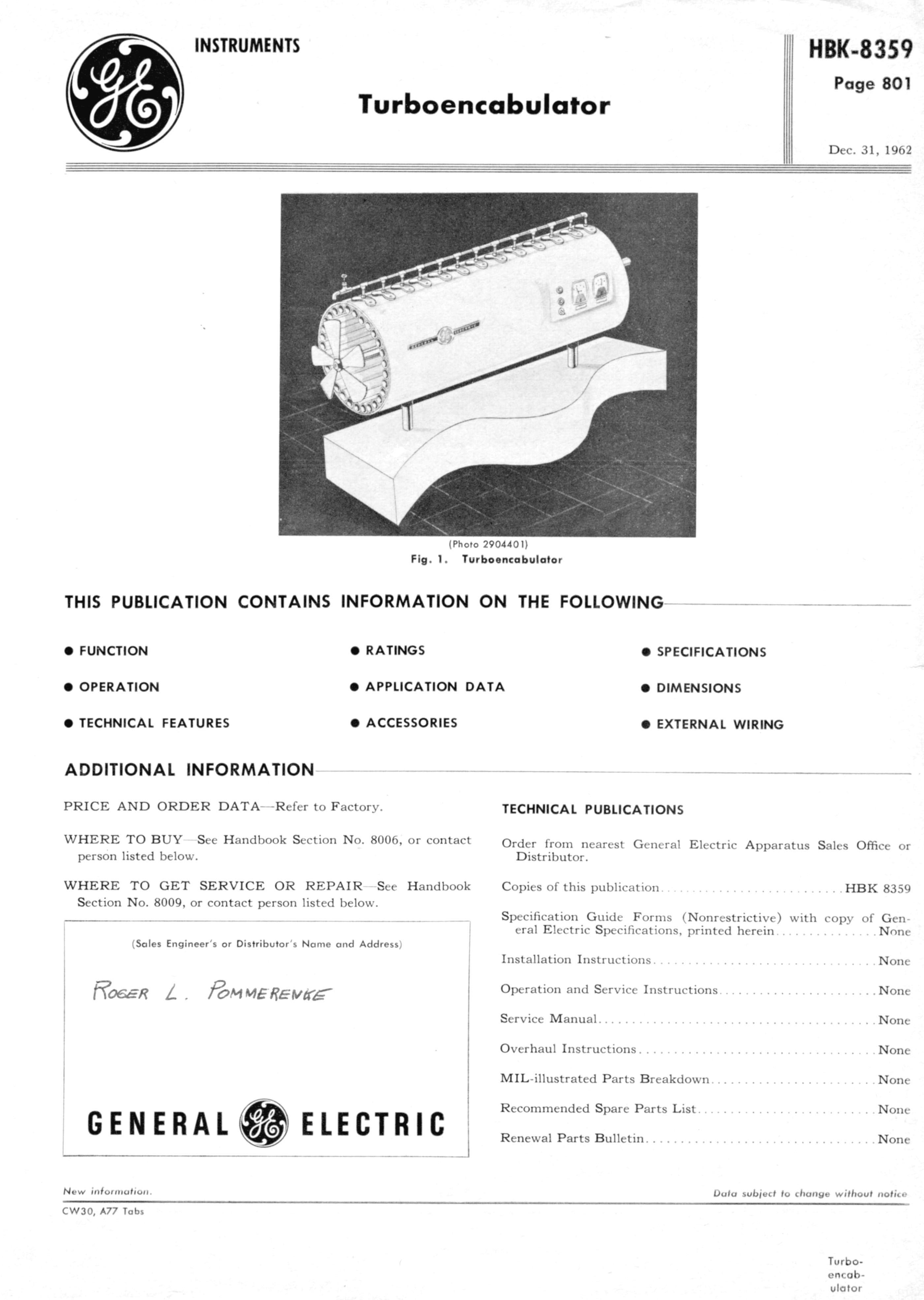
Page 1 of a 1962 description of a turbo encabulator "made" by GE

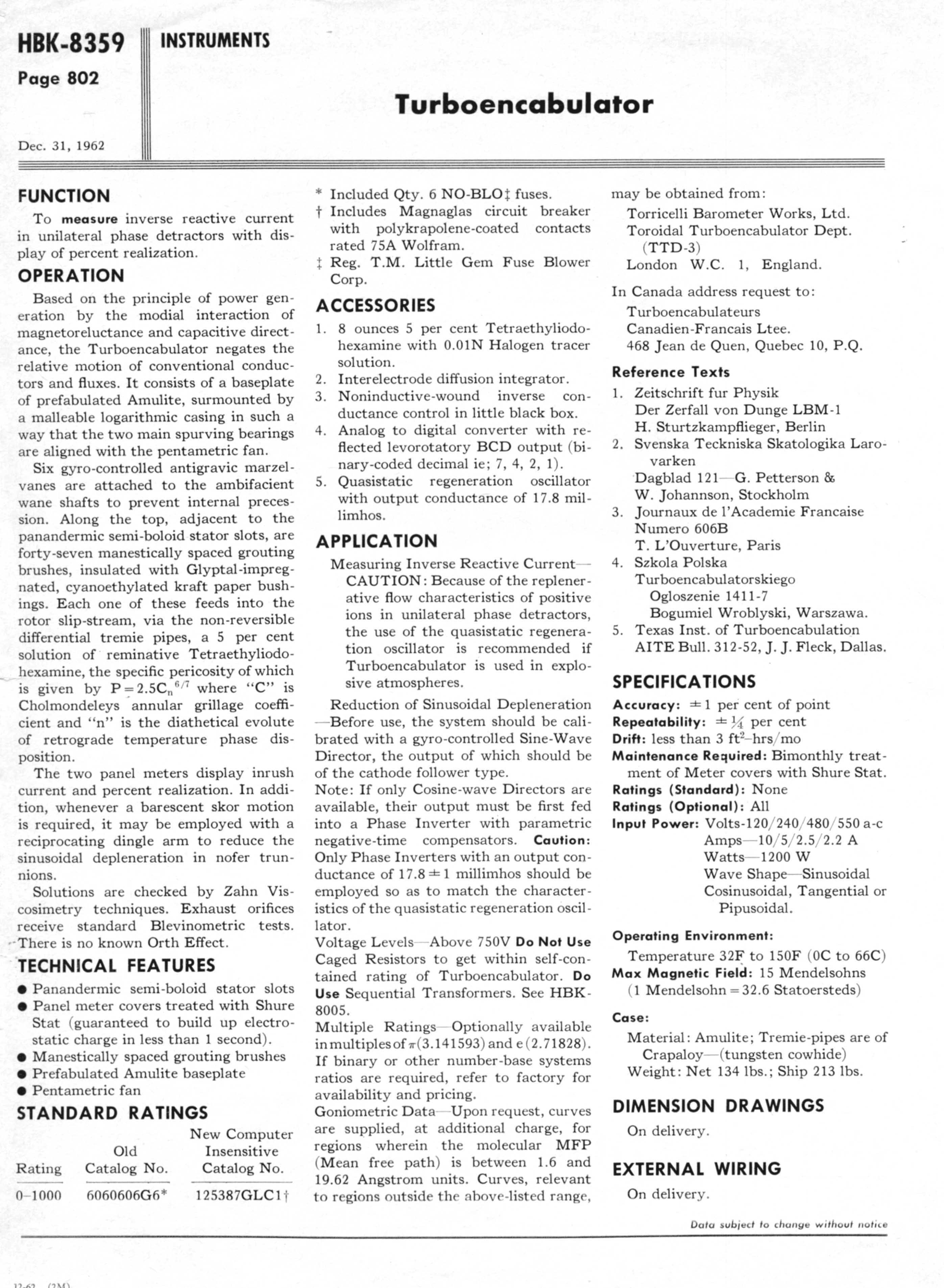
Page 2 of a 1962 description of a turbo encabulator "made" by GE

An early popular American reference to the turbo encabulator appeared in an article by New York lawyer Bernard Salwen in the April 15, 1946, issue of Time magazine. Part of Salwen's job was to review technical manuscripts, including an Arthur D. Little Industrial Bulletin which had reprinted Quick's piece, and he was amused enough by it to include the description in his article.

In response to a letter printed in the May 6 issue of Time from W. E. Habig of Madison, N.J. asking "What is a 'dingle arm'?”, the editors described it as "An adjunct to the turbo-encabulator, employed whenever a barescent skor motion is required." A month later a response to reader mail on the feature appeared in the June 3, 1946 issue:

If the sackful of mail we have received from you is any indication, the story of "The Turbo-Encabulator in Industry" struck many a responsive chord. Aside from those of you who wanted to be reassured that TIME hadn't been taken in, we received the customary complaints about using too much technical jargon for the layman, observations such as "My husband says it sounds like a new motor; I say it sounds like a dictionary that has been struck by lightning"; suggestions that it "might have come out of the mouth of Danny Kaye," and plaintive queries like: "Is this good?" Wrote one bemused U.S. Navyman: "It'sh poshible." To some the turbo-encabulator sounded as though it would be a "wonderful machine for changing baby's diapers." A reader from Hoboken assumed that it would be on sale soon in Manhattan department stores. Many of you wrote in to thank us for illuminating what you have long wanted to tell your scientist friends."

In 1962 a turbo encabulator data sheet was created by engineers at General Electric's Instrument Department, in West Lynn, Massachusetts. It quoted from the previous sources and was inserted into the General Electric Handbook. The turbo encabulator data sheet had the same format as the other pages in the G.E. Handbook. The engineers added "Shure Stat" in "Technical Features", which was peculiar only to the Instrument Department, and included the first known graphic representation of a "manufactured" turbo encabulator using parts made at the Instrument Department.

Circa 1977, Bud Haggart, an actor who appeared in many industrial training films in and around Detroit, performed in the first film realization of the description and operation of the turbo encabulator, using a truncated script adapted from Quick's article. Haggart convinced director Dave Rondot and the film crew to stay after the filming of an actual GMC Trucks project training film to realize the turbo encabulator spot.

Another version was done by Mike Kraft, who had previously worked with Bud Haggart and known as the "retro encabulator" using an Allen-Bradley motor control center and referencing other brands owned by Rockwell Automation. This version was put online and made its way to eBaum’s World, where it gained quite a bit of notoriety.

The term, in both textual and video format, has continued to appear in newer media.

In 2022, Mike Kraft returned to narrate another video describing the "SANS ICS HyperEncabulator", making many references to previous versions.

== Significance ==
The turbo encabulator has become a humorous example of obfuscation by excessive jargon in the fields of science and engineering. The term has also been used as a classic example of technobabble.

== See also ==
- Blinkenlights – Hacker jargon for computerised blinking lights
- Parody science – Spoof of scientific writing or practice
- Thiotimoline – Fictional organic compound from short stories by Isaac Asimov
- This Island Earth – 1955 film by Jack Arnold and Joseph M. Newman
- Unobtainium – Rare or fictional material
- Write-only memory (joke) – Humorous fictional type of computer memory
- Widget (economics) – Abstract name for a unit of production
