= Charles W. Lynde =

American politician

Charles W. Lynde (1790 in Brookfield, Worcester County, Massachusetts – 1860 in Brooklyn, Kings County, New York) was an American lawyer and politician from New York.

== Life ==
He was the son of John Lynde (1745–1817) and Sarah (Warner) Lynde (1753–1829). He removed to Sherburne, Chenango County, New York, and was there in business with his brother Tilly Lynde for some time. He married Cynthia Thompson, a daughter of Judge Joel Thompson (1760–1843), and later they removed to Homer, Cortland County.

Lynde was Surrogate of Cortland County from 1828 to 1832.

He was an Anti-Masonic member of the New York State Senate (6th D.) from 1831 to 1834, sitting in the 54th, 55th, 56th and 57th New York State Legislatures.

In 1838, he removed to Brooklyn and practiced law there.

Congressman William Pitt Lynde (1817–1885) was his nephew.

== Sources ==
- The New York Civil List compiled by Franklin Benjamin Hough (pages 128ff, 143 and 413; Weed, Parsons and Co., 1858)
- Charles Rollin Lynde, his son's obit in NYT on July 28, 1894
- Sherburne Cennial Celebration transcribed at RootsWeb
- Lynde genealogy at RootsWeb

New York State Senate
Preceded by Thomas G. Waterman	New York State Senate; Sixth District (Class 4); 1831–1834	Succeeded by Levi Beardsley
