= Technobabble =

Jargon-sounding nonsense

Technobabble (a portmanteau of technology and babble), is a type of language used to explain fictional concepts in a way that sounds scientific. It consists of made up scientific-sounding words, often borrowing from real scientific concepts, to make an idea sound complex without a specific meaning. It is commonly used in science fiction.

== Usage ==
Technobabble is the language used to describe science fiction concepts to make them sound scientific for the audience. The application of scientific-sounding words are used by an author to make a fictional world's concepts sound more realistic when describing made up objects, substances, and processes. This creates an impression of advanced ideas without requiring detailed explanation of the world. Describing language as technobabble often comes with a negative connotation and may be used to describe any hard-to-understand jargon.

The term technobabble was coined in 1981 to describe the phenomenon as used on Star Trek. Its use in Star Trek has since been labeled "treknobabble". Technobabble-style writing was popularized by science fiction authors like E. E. Smith, Edmond Hamilton, and John W. Campbell in pulp magazines of the 1930s and 1940s. Besides science fiction, technobabble is used in genres like superhero fiction. Technobabble terms can also be used outside of fiction to obfuscate its meaning, suggest scientific credibility, or exaggerate complexity. In engineering, the turbo-encabulator is a fictional machine used as a tongue-in-cheek reference to a machine built entirely on technobabble parts.

Technobabble can be made more convincing by defining it in the context of real scientists or scientific discoveries, a technique developed by Jules Verne to use in novels like From the Earth to the Moon (1865) in which space travel by cannon is described using the real-life study of xyloidine. While obscure scientists may be referenced, technobabble often incorporates the names of widely-known figures like Albert Einstein. Scientific consultants may provide input for writers using technobabble to make it more realistic. This has become more common in the 21st century as audiences became accustomed to traditional technobabble.

== Linguistics ==
Technobabble terms prefer complex vocabulary over simpler words and avoid brevity. They are frequently made up of two words rather than one to increase their complexity. Technobabble terms are pseudoscientific in nature, and unlike most language, lack direct meaning and are not intended to be understood or convey precise ideas.

Some technobabble terms are consistent across different works. Warp drive, a device that allows faster-than-light travel, is among the most widely recognized technobabble terms. Terms may use variants of the same words, such as the use of flux to create flux dispersion or gravimetric flux density.

Technobabble commonly uses Greek and Latin morphemes, including prefixes like hyper or intra and suffixes like tronic or ator. It sometimes misappropriates terms from other fields, and it may use already-existing terms unconventionally, but it can be less effective when it corresponds to a specific meaning that does not apply to the situation.

== See also ==
- Academese
- Bullshit
- Bogdanov affair
- Dihydrogen monoxide parody
- Flux capacitor
- Fedspeak
- Neologism
- Officialese
- Parody science
- Psychobabble
- Reverse the polarity
- Rubber science
- Sokal affair
- Turbo encabulator
- Pseudoscience

== Works cited ==
- Blackburn, Joshua (2025). The Language-Lover's Lexipedia: An A-Z of Linguistic Curiosities. Avid Reader Press. ISBN 978-1-6680-9884-4. OCLC 1541856190.
- Chernikova, Oleksandra (2025). "Science Fiction 'Technobabble': Lexical Features And Translation Challenges". Studia Philologica (24): 266–276. doi:10.28925/2311-2425.2025.2419. ISSN 2412-2491.
- Gresh, Lois H.; Weinberg, Robert (2002). The Science of Superheroes. John Wiley & Sons. ISBN 0-471-02460-0.
- May, Andrew (2019). "The Art of Technobabble". Fake Physics: Spoofs, Hoaxes and Fictitious Science. Springer. pp. 49–68. ISBN 978-3-030-13314-6.
- Smith, Jonathan C. (2010). Pseudoscience and Extraordinary Claims of the Paranormal: A Critical Thinker's Toolkit. Wiley-Blackwell. ISBN 978-1-4051-8123-5.
