= Erie (steamship, sank 1841) =

American passenger freighter on the Great Lakes

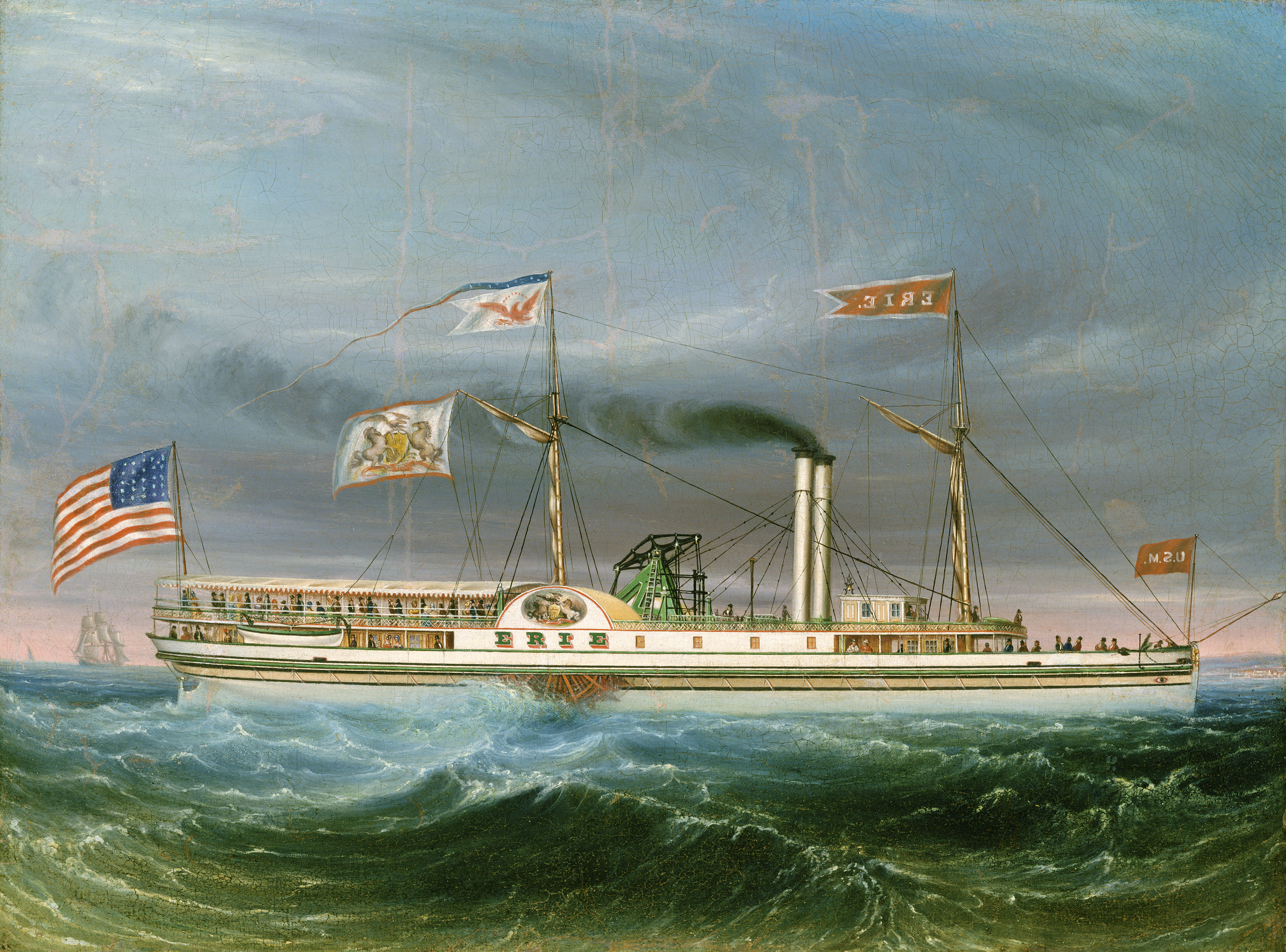
- Likely painted in 1838, artist unknown, gifted to the National Gallery of Art by Edgar William and Bernice Chrysler Garbisch

History

United States
- Name: Erie
- Owner: Charles Manning Reed
- Port of registry: Erie, Pennsylvania, U.S.
- Builder: Erie Steamboat Company, Erie, Penn.
- Completed: 1837
- Maiden voyage: May 28, 1838
- Fate: Sank off the coast of Silver Creek, New York, after burning, on August 9, 1841

General characteristics
- Type: Wooden steamship
- Tonnage: 497 GRT
- Length: 176 ft 8 in (53.85 m)
- Beam: 27 ft 4 in (8.33 m)
- Depth: 10 ft 8 in (3.25 m)
- Propulsion: Side-wheel paddle
- Speed: 16 mph (26 km/h)
- Capacity: 350
- Crew: 35–40

Erie was a steamship that operated as a passenger freighter on the Great Lakes. It caught fire and sank on August 9, 1841, resulting in the loss of an estimated 254 lives, making it one of the deadliest disasters in the history of the Great Lakes.

The Erie had a wooden hull and used a pair of side-wheel paddles for propulsion. It was built by the Erie Steamboat Company, of Erie, Pennsylvania, under the supervision of Thomas G. Colt and Smith I. Jackson. Shortly after its completion, in 1837, it was purchased by Charles Manning Reed, who was the exclusive owner of the boat until its destruction.

== Characteristics ==
The Erie had a wooden hull. It was 176 ft 8 in (53.85 m) long, with a beam of 27 ft 4 in (8.33 m), and a depth of 10 ft 8 in (3.25 m), and gross register tonnage of 497 tons. The midship had well-furnished passenger cabins to accommodate up to 250 passengers, and 12 state rooms. In all, the ship had a passenger capacity of roughly 300, including at least 30 crew. The ship also held 3 lifeboats and 60 to 100 life preservers.

== Career ==
The Erie ferried passengers between Buffalo, New York, and Chicago, Illinois, and other harbors on Lake Michigan. The ship was owned by Charles Manning Reed, a Pennsylvania state legislator, militia general, and U.S. congressman. Reed and his father owned and operated a fleet of steam ships on the Great Lakes, from their home in Erie, Pennsylvania. Reed selected Thomas Jefferson "T.J." Titus as captain. Titus was a respected sailor with a sixteen-year career on the Great Lakes.

On its maiden voyage, in late May 1838, the ship was scheduled to travel from Erie to Buffalo, and then west to Cleveland, Ohio. On the final leg of the trip, the Erie's engine failed and the ship had to be towed into Cleveland harbor. The engine was quickly repaired, however, and the Erie returned to service for the next three years. In June 1838, it made the trip from Erie, Pennsylvania, to Buffalo in just over five hours, which at that time was a speed record for a ship on the Great Lakes.

== Final voyage ==
On the evening of August 9, 1841, the Erie was loaded at Buffalo harbor with 343 passengers—including 38 crew and 8 band members to entertain the passengers. The passengers included a team of maritime painters with all of their painting equipment and supplies, including demijohns of paint, turpentine, and varnish. The painters were only planning to take the Erie until its first stop, in Pennsylvania. Their equipment was quite heavy, many items required two men to move them. So, rather than taking the equipment down to the cargo hold, the painters left their equipment in a pile on the deck, near the ventilation pipe from the ship's boiler.

The first mate of the Erie knew that this area of the deck—near the boiler ventilation—had caught fire three times in the Erie's three years of service. But McBride was not on duty on August 9. In addition to the flammable equipment brought onboard by the painters, the Erie itself had just been freshly painted and varnished within the previous two days.

At about 8 pm, roughly 4 hours after the Erie departed from Buffalo, an explosion was heard. Accounts of the disaster conclude that this was the turpentine combusting due to being overpressurized by the heat from the ventilation port. All the highly flammable painting equipment apparently caught fire immediately and the fire spread within seconds over the entire freshly varnished hull.

Captain Titus rushed from the upper deck to the ladies cabin, where the life preservers were stored, but found the flames were already so intense he could not enter the cabin. The flames also quickly reached the boiler room and the engineer reported he was unable to reach the engine. The pilot was directed to turn the ship to starboard to try to get nearer to land, and while in that turn, the crew attempted to lower the lifeboats into the water. Due to the ship's turn, two of the lifeboats were immediately capsized and sunk. The third and final lifeboat was successfully deployed, carrying just Captain Titus and four others. Other passengers and crew had begun jumping into the water to avoid the flames, and the lifeboat picked up one passenger.

The first rescue ship arrived at 10 pm—the DeWitt Clinton, another passenger freighter which departed from Buffalo a few hours before the Erie. The Lady arrived soon after. The Clinton's crew described that the entire hull of the Erie above the waterline had already been burnt away, leaving a black, smouldering wood frame around an intact boiler. Dozens of passengers were floating in the water crying for help. By 1 am, all the survivors had been picked up and the lake was quiet. Fewer than 100 were rescued. An effort was made to tow the remains of the Erie to shore, but it sank around dawn on August 10.

== Casualties ==
Initial estimates were that about 170 had been lost in the disaster. Later accounts determined that the number was likely as high as 254. The six painters who brought aboard the flammable equipment had been hired by William G. Miller of Buffalo. All six died in the disaster, as did Miller's sister. Other notable casualties included two brothers of future U.S. congressman William Pitt Lynde.

== Location ==
In June 1842 it was reported that Captain Miles, of the steamboat Star, had succeeded in finding the hull of the Erie about 3 miles below the mouth of Cattaraugus Creek and 5 miles from shore.
