= Rubber science =

Literary device in science fiction

Rubber science is a science fiction term describing a quasi-scientific explanation for an aspect of a science fiction setting. Rubber science explanations are fictional but convincing enough to avoid upsetting the suspension of disbelief. Rubber science is a feature of most genres of science fiction, with the exception of hard science fiction.

== Coinage ==
The term rubber science was coined by Norman Spinrad in his essay "Rubber Sciences", published in Reginald Bretnor's anthology The Craft of Science Fiction (1976). Rubber science was Spinrad's term for "pseudo-science ... made up by the writer with literary care that it not be discontinuous with the reader's realm of the possible." In "Rubber Sciences," Spinrad proposed eight rules of rubber science to write plausibly about future technology:

1. Explanations must feel scientifically correct and have internal consistency.
2. Principles used for plot purposes must be planted in the reader's mind long before they are used as plot elements.
3. Concepts shouldn't be over-explained; a theoretical basis is sufficient.
4. When creating a new science, authors should pay attention to how established sciences evolve.
5. Interfacing two or more existing sciences will create a plausible new science.
6. Plausibility can be lent by systematizing terminology and relating it to existing human knowledge by choosing words for metaphorical resonance.
7. Rubber science can be solidified with believable hardware.
8. Rubber science can "contribute to the dialectic of scientific evolution" as a tool for intellectually exploring the unknown.

== Usage ==
The term and concept have been adopted by science fiction writers to describe science based on "speculation, extrapolation, fabrication or invention." Vonda N. McIntyre calls rubber science "a grand tradition" in science fiction and places it in "a hierarchy of rules for science in sf": "if you can make it right, you should; if you can't make it right, at least make it plausible; if you can't make it right or plausible, you had better make it fun."

In their writing guide On Writing Science Fiction, George H. Scithers, Darrell Schweitzer, and John M. Ford cite Spinrad's rules for rubber science as a way to "play fair with the reader," building a background logically from a minimum of assumptions, and focusing on the consequences of those assumptions rather than the assumptions themselves.

Science fiction author Poul Anderson references Spinrad's concept of rubber science in his article "On Imaginary Science". Anderson prefers the term imaginary science to avoid plagiarizing Spinrad. He divides imaginary science into three types of usage: routine use, where the concepts are taken for granted; loose use, where concepts are treated for their own sake but without rigor; and brilliant use, where the implications of concepts are deeply explored. Anderson reiterates Spinrad's requirement that authors using rubber science know real science and avoid violating it unless they are conscious of what they are doing and what it means.

=== In other media ===
While rubber science was coined in reference to science fiction literature, the term has spread to discussion of science fiction in other media, including film, television, comic books, and gaming. Star Trek: Voyager script consultant Andre Bormanis used "the so-called rubber science or the very speculative, consistent with reality" when he was unable to find scientific explanations "based in fairly well-established real science". Game designer Steven S. Long included guidance for implementing rubber science in his Hero System tabletop role-playing game ruleset.

=== Criticism ===
Some science fiction authors have used the term disparagingly. Bill Ransom associates rubber science with science fiction of the 1940s and 1950s, an era marked by "lots of cool gadgets," before "the genre became more character driven" under the influence of writers such as Frank Herbert and Samuel Delany, focusing on humans rather than technology solving dilemmas. Lucius Shepard, responding to a negative review by George Turner, decried the suggestion that he "haul a gob of rubber science out of the vat in order to justify and explain [his] physics". Ann C. Crispin considered Star Trek's rubber science to be a forgivable flaw.

John G. Cramer included an afterword in his hard science fiction novel Twistor to note places where he departed from accurate real science into speculative rubber science. He expressed concern that as a literary device, rubber science added drama at the expense of potentially deceiving the reader into believing the rubber science was factual; he documented his use of rubber science for readers interested in "where the boundaries are between the real and the rubber science" in his novel.

Reviewers have used the term to praise deft or plausible scientific explanations, and to criticise underdeveloped or distracting worldbuilding; for instance, a Washington Post review criticized Orson Scott Card's novel Xenocide for its "chapter long dialogues about rubber science".

== See also ==
- Technobabble
