= Harry Lynde Bradley =

American businessman (1885–1965)

- Born: January 5, 1885; Kansas City, Missouri, United States
- Died: July 23, 1965 (aged 80); Milwaukee, Wisconsin, United States
- Resting place: Forest Home Cemetery
- Occupation: Inventor
- Employer: Allen-Bradley
- Known for: The Lynde and Harry Bradley Foundation

Harry Lynde Bradley (January 5, 1885 – July 23, 1965), the brother of Lynde Bradley, was the co-founder of the Allen-Bradley Company and the Lynde and Harry Bradley Foundation. He "became deeply involved in conservative causes", with "a strong sense of anti-communism animat[ing] his political beliefs". He was a founding member of the John Birch Society. He supported Robert A. Taft for the Presidency in 1952, and Barry Goldwater in 1964.

The Foundation, however, remained relatively small-scale until twenty years after Bradley's death, with the billion-dollar sale of Allen-Bradley to Rockwell Automation, which swelled the Foundation's assets from around $14m to around $290m.

His adopted daughter, Marion Bradley Via, lived in Virginia, and died in 1993. His daughter Jane Bradley Pettit, a philanthropist in Milwaukee, Wisconsin, died in 2001.

== Books ==
- Gurda, John (1992). The Bradley legacy: Lynde and Harry Bradley, their company, and their foundation. Milwaukee, Wis.: Lynde and Harry Bradley Foundation. LCCN 92081974. OCLC 26821637.
