= Lynde Bradley =

American engineer and businessman (1931-1995)

- Born: August 19, 1878; Milwaukee, Wisconsin, U.S.
- Died: February 8, 1942 (aged 63); Milwaukee, Wisconsin, U.S.
- Occupation(s): Industrialist, philanthropist
- Known for: The Lynde and Harry Bradley Foundation, Allen-Bradley Company
- Spouse: Caroline Doll

Lynde Bradley (August 19, 1878 – February 8, 1942), the brother of Harry Lynde Bradley, was the co-founder of the Allen-Bradley Company and the Lynde and Harry Bradley Foundation.

Bradley was born in Milwaukee, Wisconsin, the eldest son of Henry Clay Bradley and Clara Blanchard Lynde, and attended Milwaukee Public Schools.

"In 1901, Lynde was working for Milwaukee Electric when he came up with an idea for improving the controllers that regulate motor speed. He quit his job, secured a $1,000 investment from Dr. Stanton Allen, and founded the Allen-Bradley Company. Harry joined his brother three years later, and together they turned a two-man shop into a major center of industry."

Bradley was president of the Allen-Bradley Company between 1916 and 1942.

Shortly before his death, plans were made to create a foundation, and the Lynde Bradley Foundation was established by his estate soon after his death.
