= Allen-Bradley =

American factory automation equipment brand owned by Rockwell Automation

- Industry: Factory Automation Equipment Manufacturer
- Predecessor: Compression Rheostat Company
- Founded: 1903; 123 years ago in Wisconsin, United States
- Founders: Dr. Stanton Allen and Lynde Bradley
- Headquarters: Milwaukee, Wisconsin, United States
- Owner: Rockwell Automation
- Website: ab.rockwellautomation.com

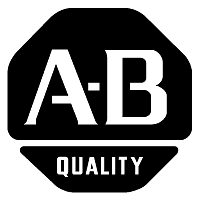
Logo used by Allen-Bradley prior to its acquisition by Rockwell Automation

Previous logo

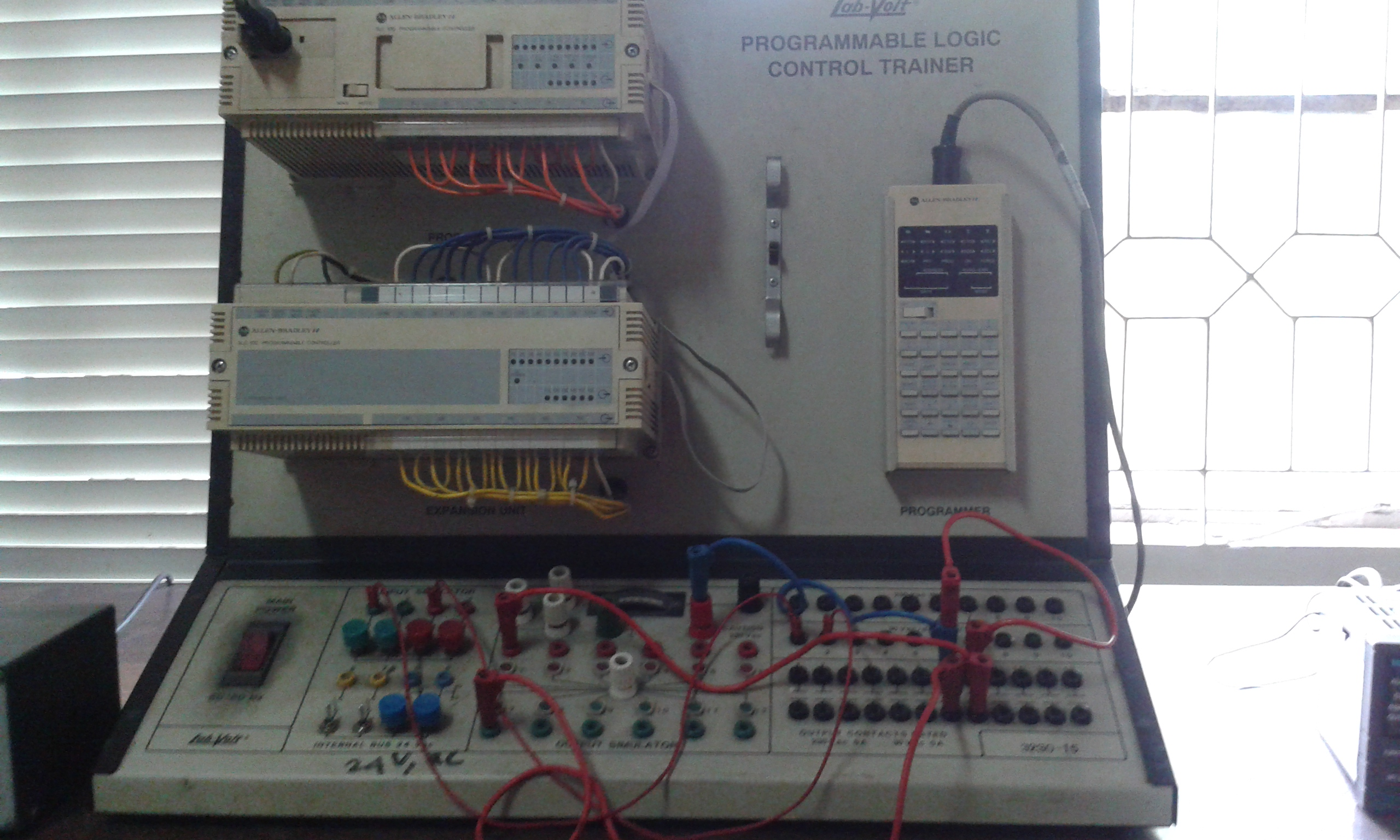
Allen Bradley Programmable Controller with programmer

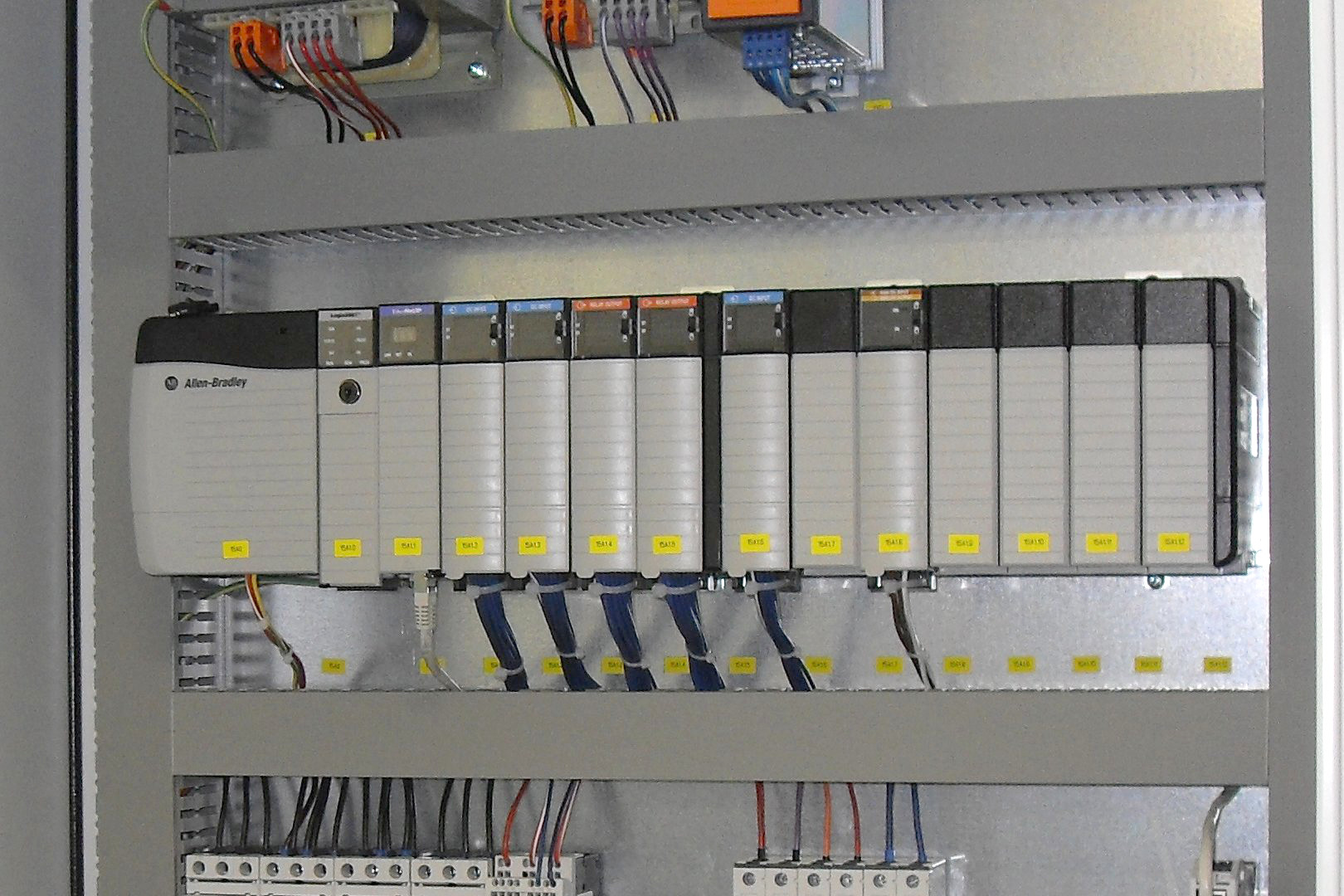
Allen-Bradley PLC installed in a control panel

Allen-Bradley is the brand-name of a line of factory automation equipment owned by Rockwell Automation. The company, with revenues of approximately US $6.4 billion in 2013, manufactures programmable logic controllers (PLC), human-machine interfaces, sensors, safety components and systems, software, drives and drive systems, contactors, motor control centers, and systems of such products. Rockwell Automation also provides asset-management services including repair and consulting. Rockwell Automation's headquarters is in Milwaukee, Wisconsin.

== History ==
In 1893 Lynde Bradley constructed his first carbon pile rheostat, used to operate a toy lathe.

In 1901, with $1000 Dr. Stanton Allen and Lynde Bradley developed a current controlled carbon disc compression-type motor controller for industrial cranes in the workshops of the Milwaukee Electric Company, completing it on August 18th, 1901. Milwaukee Electric would soon after adopt the device.

Allen-Bradley began in 1903 as the Compression Rheostat Launch Company in the Pfeiffer & Smith Machine Shop. They signed an agreement with the American Fuse Company of Muskegon Michigan.

In 1904, 19-year-old Harry Bradley joined his brother in the business, and the company's first patented product, the crane controller, was demonstrated at the St. Louis World's Fair the same year. Also in 1904 they started marketing the controller with the Allen-Bradley brand, reasoning that with proper advertising, the name would survive as a valuable entity even if their relationship with American Fuse soured.

In 1909, Dr. Stanton Allen and Lynde Bradley resigned from the American Fuse Company and returned from Oregon to Milwaukee. American fuse offered $10,000 for their patents, a $5,000 dollar lump sum, and employment at a rate of $150 a month. They were politely declined.

=== Allen-Bradley Company ===
In 1910, the company was renamed the Allen-Bradley Company in an effort to distinguish itself from the American Electric Fuse Company's continued fraudulent use of their names and patents.

In 1911 Frank Jone's American Electric Fuse Company collapsed due to embezzlement.

In 1916, business had expanded enough to purchase the Pfeiffer & Smith Machine Shop outright.

In 1919 the Greenfield Avenue building was constructed.

Allen-Bradley expanded rapidly during World War I in response to government-contracted work. Its product line grew to include automatic starters, switches, circuit breakers, relays, and other electric equipment. After the war, the company grew its miniature rheostat business to support the burgeoning radio industry. By the middle of the 1920s, nearly 50 percent of the company's sales were attributed to the radio department. The year 1929 closed with record company sales of $3 million.

In 1922 the Bradleystat was introduced. It was widely adopted in early radios, by 1925 making up more than half of the companies sales.

In 1923 the Octagon Logo was introduced.

In 1924, the foot pedal for the Singer Sewing Machine was developed by Allen Bradley.

In 1928, an eight story addition was added to, and around the prior buildings.

By 1932, at the start of the Great Depression, the company was posting record losses. It reduced its workforce and cut wages by 50%. Throughout this period, Lynde Bradley supported an aggressive research and development approach intended to "develop the company out of the Depression." By 1937, Allen-Bradley employment had rebounded to pre-Depression levels and company sales reached an all-time high of nearly $4 million.

In 1934 a solenoid starter with a single moving part was introduced.

In 1935 the hot molded fixed resistor was invented.

In 1942 Lynde Bradley died and his brother Harry Bradley took over the company.

World War II fueled unprecedented levels of production, with 80% of the company's orders being war-related. Wartime orders were centered on two broad lines of products: industrial controls to speed production, and electrical components or radio parts used in a wide range of military equipment. Allen-Bradley expanded its facilities numerous times during the 1940s to meet wartime production needs, adding more manufacturing capability, a gym, and medical facilities.

With Fred Loock serving as president and Harry Bradley as chairman, the company began a major $1 million, two-year expansion project in 1947. The company completed additional expansions at its Milwaukee facilities in the 1950s and 1960s, the original clock, now the temperature tower was completed in 1950, while the larger Allen-Bradley clock tower was constructed in 1962.

In 1952 it opened a subsidiary in Galt, Ontario, Canada, that employs over 1000 people.

In 1954 Allen-Bradley started supplying ferrite magnets

In 1957, the Brook Stevens redesigned the logo.

Series K Across-The-Line Starters were introduced in 1960.

In 1964 Allen Bradley purchased the Rostone Corporation.

In 1968 TEGA tiles were introduced through a Canadian subsidiary acquired as part of the Rostone acquisition.

In 1969, the first factory outside of the United States in the United Kingdom was opened.

In 1970, the company introduced the programmable logic controller.

In 1979 Data Highway was introduced.

During the mid-20th century, mid-sized firms such as Allen-Bradley tended to embrace reactionary politics out of a fear that increased government regulation would cut into their profits. Unlike large, multinational corporations that dealt directly with customers, historian Rick Perlstein argues that these smaller companies were less concerned about potential public blowback. Allen-Bradley paid for propaganda posters that asked “Will You Be Free to Celebrate Christmas in the Future?” and circulated allegations that the Soviet Union was using mind-control techniques to keep communist nations in line. One of the company's founders, Harry Lynde Bradley, was a founding member of the John Birch Society and co-founded the Bradley Foundation, a right-wing think tank. After being purchased by Rockwell International in 1985, the company has since distanced itself from the Bradley Foundation.

In 1968, the NAACP and the Latino community joined in a march to protest Allen-Bradley's discriminatory hiring practices, an event that marked the beginning of Latino activism in Milwaukee.

In 1985, Rockwell International purchased Allen-Bradley for $1.651 billion; this was the largest acquisition in Wisconsin's history to date. For all intents and purposes, Rockwell took over Allen-Bradley's industrial automation division.

=== Rockwell Automation Brand ===
Allen-Bradley is credited with coining the term PLC (Programmable Logic Controller) when it launched one of the first-ever programmable controller in 1970, the 1774 PLC. Around the same time as the 1774 PLC development (dubbed the PLC-1), Allen-Bradley then launched the concept of Data Highway one of the first computer networks to be designed exclusively for a digital control system. The PLC-1 was followed by the PLC-2, PLC-3, and then the PLC-5 product line.

In 1985, the PLC 5 and RSLogix5 was introduced under the Allen-Bradley brand.

In the late 1990's the well known Retro Encabulator video was filmed

In 1991 the SLC500 PLC was introduced.

In 1994 the MicroLogix PLC was introduced.

In 1995 the millionth plc was shipped.

In 1997 the ControlLogix PLC and RSLogix5000 was introduced.

In 1999 Rockwell International moved their corporate headquarters to the Allen Bradley building in Milwaukee.

In 2006 the CompactLogix PLC was introduced.

In 2011 the Micro800 family of micro programmable controllers was introduced.

== See also ==
- Allen-Bradley Clock Tower
