= Deaths in May 1979 =

The following is a list of notable deaths in May 1979. Entries for each day are listed alphabetically by surname. A typical entry lists information in the following sequence:

- Name, age, country of citizenship at birth, subsequent country of citizenship (if applicable), reason for notability, cause of death (if known), and reference.

== May 1979 ==
=== 1 ===
- Nancy Douglas Bowditch, 88, American artist, author and Baháʼí Faith leader.
- Richard Docherty, 79, Australian Roman Catholic priest.
- Raymond Fol, 51, French jazz pianist.
- Bronislav Gimpel, 68, Polish-American violinist.
- Hans Hecker, 84, German general.
- Ernest Hoar, 80, Australian politician.
- Gen'ichi Katō, 89, Japanese physiologist.
- Pietro Lazzari, 83, Italian-American painter and sculptor.
- Taisto Mäki, 68, Finnish long-distance runner.
- Dick Maynard, 81, Australian footballer.
- Sir Arthur McIlveen, 92, Australian soldier and Salvation Army leader.
- Morteza Motahhari, 60, Iranian Shia cleric, shot.
- Paul Randles, 56, South African cricketer.
- Rolf Ingvar Semmingsen, 70, Norwegian civil servant.
- Luis Urquiri, 72, Spanish footballer.

=== 2 ===
- Salud Algabre, 82–83, Filipino independence activist.
- Alf Crump, 56, Australian footballer.
- Boris Ephrussi, 77, Russian-French geneticist.
- Sanezumi Fujimoto, 68, Japanese film producer.
- Berkeley Gaskin, 71, Guyanese cricketer.
- Ezekiel C. Gathings, 75, American politician, member of the U.S. House of Representatives (1939–1969).
- Edith Maxwell, 65, American educator and convicted murderer.
- Giulio Natta, 76, Italian chemical engineer, Nobel Prize laureate (1963), complications from Parkinson's disease.
- Henry Nehemiah Nickerson, 90, American naval officer.
- Lou Raymond, 84, American baseball player.

=== 3 ===
- Charles Angoff, 77, American magazine editor.
- Mary Ellinor Lucy Archer, 85, Australian botanist and librarian.
- Archibald C. Buchanan, 89, American jurist and politician.
- John Field, 92, American football player and coach.
- Marcel Florkin, 78, Belgian biochemist.
- Carl Gunne, 85, Swedish painter.
- Tom Jenkins, 81, American baseball player.
- Gordon Luce, 90, English-Burmese historian.
- Archduchess Margaret of Austria, 53, Austrian-Swedish royal.
- Erin O'Brien-Moore, 77, American actress (Peyton Place, Street Scene), cancer.
- Dusty Rhodes, 87, New Zealand artist.
- William Spengler, 90, American Olympic boxer (1920).
- James Noel Thomson, 90, British general.
- Karl Umrigar, 18, Indian jockey, fall from horse.

=== 4 ===
- Leif Erland Andersson, 35, Swedish astronomer, lymphoma.
- Jack Cruise, 63, Irish comedian and actor, heart attack.
- František Řezáč, 36, Czech Olympic cyclist (1964, 1968).
- John Bentley Stringer, 51, British computer scientist.
- Tezer Taşkıran, 71–72, Turkish politician.

=== 5 ===
- Thomas Amarasuriya, 71, Sri Lankan politician.
- James A. Burden III, 81, American businessman.
- Virgil Cheeves, 78, American baseball player.
- Dmitri Chikhradze, 56, Soviet football player and manager.
- Bertie Fulton, 72, Northern Irish footballer.
- Bill Lucas, 43, American baseball player and manager, stroke.
- Rudolf Pfeiffer, 89, German classical scholar.
- Allene Ray, 78, American actress, cancer.
- Rodney Rought-Rought, 71, English cricketer.
- Josef Schimmer, 56, Austrian Olympic field hockey player (1952).
- Jack Taylor, 66, New Zealand rugby player.

=== 6 ===
- Milton Ager, 85, American composer ("Happy Days Are Here Again").
- Georges Daumezon, 66, French psychiatrist.
- Allen Elliott, 81, American baseball player.
- Joe Hooper, 40, American soldier, stroke.
- Mary Ibberson, 86, British musician and music educator.
- Henry Edward Kenny, 90, English soldier.
- Rosemary LaPlanche, 55, American actress and model, cancer.
- Bernard Leach, 92, British studio potter.
- James H. Madole, 51, American neo-Nazi activist.
- Hilton Poulier, 69–70, Sri Lankan cricketer.
- Karl Wilhelm Reinmuth, 87, German astronomer.
- Sir George William Rendel, 90, British diplomat.
- Charlie Ripple, 58, American baseball player.
- Bunny Roser, 77, American baseball player.
- Władysław Szczepaniak, 68, Polish football player and manager.

=== 7 ===
- Nils Andersen, 77, Norwegian Olympic runner (1924).
- Johnny Berger, 77, American baseball player.
- Raúl Blanco Cervantes, 76, Costa Rican politician, vice president (1953–1958, 1962–1966).
- Øivind Bolstad, 74, Norwegian playwright and novelist.
- Erik Brofoss, 70, Norwegian economist and politician.
- Nora FitzGibbon, 90, New Zealand nurse.
- André Hellegers, 52, Dutch bioethicist, heart attack.
- Ralph Huffman, 63, American football and track and field coach.
- Charles Hug, 79, Swiss painter and illustrator.
- Marty McHale, 92, American baseball player, vaudeville performer and journalist.
- Bill Ralston, 68, Australian footballer.
- Heinz Reinefarth, 75, German SS commander and war criminal.
- Roy Schilling, 82, Australian politician.
- Aleksei Smirnov, 59, Soviet actor.
- Sven Utterström, 77, Swedish Olympic skier (1928, 1932).
- Vivian Weston, 64, Scottish rugby player.
- Thomas White, 86, English cricketer.

=== 8 ===
- Julia Codesido, 95, Peruvian painter.
- Berton Crandall, 96, American architect and photographer.
- Hunt Davies, 82, Welsh rugby player.
- Carmen García González, 75, Mexican socialite, first lady of Mexico (1928–1930).
- Jacques Houssin, 76, French filmmaker.
- Robert Kennedy, 53, Rhodesian rugby player, injuries sustained from a gunshot wound.
- Georges Lampin, 77, Russian-born French actor and film director.
- Mikhail Panov, 77, Soviet general.
- Talcott Parsons, 76, American sociologist, stroke.
- Victor Saville, 83, English filmmaker.
- Christine Smith, 32, Australian Olympic skier (1964), suicide by drug overdose.
- Rodica Sutzu, 66, Romanian composer and pianist.
- Robert Thom, 49, American screenwriter (Death Race 2000, Wild in the Streets, All the Fine Young Cannibals), heart attack.
- Ernst Wallfisch, 58, German-born Romanian-American violist, heart attack.
- Notable Iranian politicians executed by firing squad on this date:
  - Mohammad Reza Ameli Tehrani, 51
  - Gholamreza Kianpour, 49–50
  - Javad Saeed, 55

=== 9 ===
- Sir Charles Adermann, 82, Australian politician, MP (1943–1972).
- Antonio Bacchetti, 56, Italian footballer.
- Salvador Balbuena, 29, Spanish golfer, heart attack.
- Sir Jack Ellerton Becker, 74, Australian businessman.
- Francesco Borello, 77, Italian footballer.
- Cyrus S. Eaton, 95, Canadian-American banker and businessman.
- Habib Elghanian, 67, Iranian businessman and philanthropist, execution by firing squad.
- Charlie Hargreaves, 82, American baseball player.
- Kazuto Ishida, 75, Japanese jurist, Chief Justice of the Supreme Court of Japan (1969–1973).
- Eddie Jefferson, 60, American jazz musician, shot.
- Zoltán Kelemen, 53, Hungarian singer.
- Bruce Kent, 50, New Zealand Olympic cyclist (1956), electrocuted.
- Bill Killiby, 68, Australian rugby player.
- Gabriel Ramanantsoa, 73, Malagasy politician, president and prime minister (1972–1975).

=== 10 ===
- Antun Augustinčić, 79, Croatian sculptor.
- Walter Batty, 74, New Zealand rugby player.
- István Bibó, 67, Hungarian politician, lawyer and political theorist.
- Hans Bjerrum, 79, Danish Olympic field hockey player (1920).
- Louis Paul Boon, 67, Belgian novelist.
- Beatrice Campbell, 56, Northern Irish actress.
- Moose Cochran, 81, American football player.
- Franklin E. Ebner, 75, American politician, member of the Minnesota Senate (1933–1935).
- Charles Frankel, 61, American philosopher, shot.
- James Leroy, 32, Canadian singer, suicide by drug overdose.
- Carl Martin, 73, American blues musician.
- J. B. Morton, 85, English writer.
- Ita Rina, 71, Slovenian actress and beauty queen, asthma attack.
- Robert Steen, 45, Canadian politician, liver cancer.
- Alan Story, 65, Australian footballer.
- Hōne Taiapa, 66, New Zealand woodcarver.

=== 11 ===
- Joan Chandler, 55, American actress (Rope, Humoresque, My Three Angels), cancer.
- Waldron Faulkner, 81, American architect.
- Lester Flatt, 64, American singer and bluegrass musician ("The Ballad of Jed Clampett"), heart failure.
- Albrecht Gaiswinkler, 73, Austrian politician.
- Barbara Hutton, 66, American socialite and philanthropist, heart attack.
- Bernard Kettlewell, 72, British geneticist and entomologist, accidental drug overdose.
- George Kringelbach, 51, Danish journalist.
- Rebecca Kunash, 6, American murder victim, homicide by drowning.
- Mullie Lenoir, 82, American football player and coach.
- Dorothy Lyndall, 88, American dancer and dance educator.
- Chris Rosenberg, 28, American gangster, shot.
- John Swope, 70, American photographer.
- Odile Tailleu, 81, Belgian racing cyclist.
- Felix von Eckardt, 75, German journalist and propagandist, heart attack.

=== 12 ===
- Alf Benison, 60, Australian footballer.
- Pierre Brunet, 71, French Olympic rower (1932).
- Lesley Clifford, 42, English cricketer.
- Victoria Joyce Ely, 89, American nurse.
- Rosario María Gutiérrez Eskildsen, 80, Mexican linguist and lexicographer.
- Frank Johnson, 62, Australian footballer.
- Kalpana, 35, Indian actress, suicide by drug overdose.
- Clyde Kluttz, 61, American baseball player, scout and executive, heart and kidney disease.
- Carlo A. Lanzillotti, 68, American politician, member of the New York State Senate (1953–1954).
- Mykola Nedilko, 76, Soviet Ukrainian-American painter.
- Ileana Sărăroiu, 42, Romanian singer, brain aneurysm.
- Olga Schwind, 92, German-Swiss musician.
- Leonardantonio Sforza, 80, Italian politician.
- G. King Thompson, 91, American jurist.

=== 13 ===
- Predrag Đajić, 57, Yugoslav footballer, heart attack.
- Iris Hoey, 93, English actress.
- Vera Nilsson, 90, Swedish painter and peace activist.
- J. R. W. Purves, 76, Australian lawyer and philatelist.
- Antoinette Quinche, 83, Swiss politician and feminist activist.
- Flora Shaw Stewart, 92, Scottish-born Papua New Guinean businesswoman.

=== 14 ===
- Sir Peter Kerley, 78, Irish radiologist and physician.
- Josef Kitzmüller, 66, Austrian footballer.
- Viktor Novikov, 74, Soviet Greek Orthodox prelate.
- Heinz Pollay, 71, German Olympic equestrian (1936, 1952).
- Jean Rhys, 88, Dominican-English novelist (Wide Sargasso Sea).
- Thomas Scherman, 62, American conductor.
- Kinnosuke Takamatsu, 81, Japanese actor.

=== 15 ===
- Jerry Akers, 91, American baseball player.
- Víctor Hugo Arias, 66, Chilean politician.
- John Russell Fulton, 82, American illustrator, lung cancer.
- Sheila Henig, 45, Canadian pianist and singer, suicide by carbon monoxide poisoning.
- Harry Hurst, 60, English-born Canadian boxer.
- John Conrad Jaeger, 71, Australian mathematician.
- Albertus L. Meyers, 88–89, American conductor.
- Dionisije Milivojević, 80, Serbian-American Serbian Orthodox prelate.
- Dora Mavor Moore, 91, Scottish-born Canadian actress and theatre director.
- O Yeong-su, 70, South Korean novelist.
- Mischa Portnoff, 77, American composer, heart attack.
- Adele Poston, 94, American nurse and psychiatrist.
- Joaquim Sampaio, 64, Portuguese Olympic sports shooter (1952).
- Elemér Somfay, 80, Hungarian Olympic pentathlete (1924).
- Curtis Stevens, 80, American Olympic bobsledder (1932).
- Leif Størmer, 73, Norwegian geologist and paleontologist.
- George Walsh, 79, New Zealand politician, MP (1951–1972).
- Huck Welch, 71, Canadian football player.

=== 16 ===
- Avraam Benaroya, 91–92, Bulgarian-Israeli politician and activist.
- Nimio de Anquín, 82, Argentine writer, political theorist and fascist leader.
- William Stephen Finsen, 73, South African astronomer.
- Robert Florey, 78, French-American filmmaker (Daughter of Shanghai, The Cocoanuts, Murders in the Rue Morgue).
- René Hournon, 74, French Olympic racing cyclist (1924).
- Ellen Kent Hughes, 85, Australian politician and pediatrician.
- Józef Mamoń, 57, Polish footballer.
- Roy Montrell, 51, American guitarist, drug overdose.
- A. Philip Randolph, 90, American civil rights activist.
- Walter Schoeller, 90, Swiss rower.
- Kampatimar Shankariya, 27, Indian convicted serial killer, execution by hanging.
- Hermann Weiss, 70, Austrian ice hockey player.

=== 17 ===
- Frederick Blackett, 79, British Olympic hurdler (1924).
- Tony Calvelli, 63, American football player.
- Zvonimir Cimermančić, 61, Yugoslav footballer, traffic collision.
- Wilber G. Katz, 76–77, American legal scholar and academic administrator.
- Donyale Luna, 33, American model and actress, heroin overdose.
- Ab Newsome, 59, Canadian ice hockey player.

=== 18 ===
- Henry Aspinwall, 83, American architect.
- Chalmer Ault, 78, American football player.
- Ray Blades, 82, American baseball player, scout and manager.
- Vernon Brown, 72, American jazz trombonist.
- George Campbell, 61, Irish writer and artist.
- Boris Chaliapin, 74, Russian-American illustrator, cancer.
- Tom Everuss, 75, Australian footballer.
- Stephen Fry, 78, English cricketer.
- Idrus, 57, Indonesian novelist.
- Louise Lightfoot, 76, Australian dancer, choreographer and architect.
- Tommy Lockhart, 87, American ice hockey executive.
- Phebe Florence Miller, 89, Canadian writer.
- John E. Mulroney, 83, American jurist, heart attack.
- V. T. Sambanthan, 59, Malaysian politician, acting prime minister (1973).
- Benjamin P. Sandler, 77, American dietician and physician.
- Paul Southwell, 65, Kittitian politician, premier (since 1978), heart disease.
- Muriel Stanley, 61, Australian nurse, missionary and social worker.

=== 19 ===
- Museyib Allahverdiyev, 70, Soviet Azerbaijani soldier.
- Sir Andrew Clark, 3rd Baronet, 80, British barrister and hereditary peer.
- Hazari Prasad Dwivedi, 71, Indian novelist and translator.
- Benjamin W. Fortson Jr., 74, American politician, Georgia secretary of state (since 1946), heart failure.
- Sami Gabra, 97, Egyptian archaeologist.
- Halla, 34, German Crossbred show jumping horse.
- Ralph Duncan James, 70, Canadian mathematician.
- Martin Lawlor, 82, Irish hurler.
- Sigfrid Lundberg, 84, Swedish Olympic racing cyclist (1920).
- Peter Miller, 71, Scottish footballer.
- Rewati Kant Sinha, 50, Indian politician.
- Ed Souza, 57, American soccer player.
- George M. Williamson, 87, American architect.

=== 20 ===
- John Phillip Harison Acocks, 68, South African botanist.
- Hope Bagenal, 91, British acoustician and architectural theorist.
- Florence Ellen Hewitt, 68, South African botanist and algologist.
- Eamon Kissane, 80, Irish politician, TD (1932–1951).
- Daniel Lehu, 83, French Olympic swimmer (1920).
- Oh Hwa-sup, 62–63, South Korean literary scholar.
- Jack Pulman, 53, English screenwriter (I, Claudius), heart attack.
- Bill Rank, 74, American jazz trombonist.
- Nils Rohlsson, 63, Swedish tennis player.
- Helen Smith, 23, British nurse, fall.
- Virginia Tanner, 64, American dance instructor.
- Elvie Thomas, 87, American blues singer and musician.

=== 21 ===
- Bernadette Armiger, 64, American nursing leader and Roman Catholic nun, leukemia.
- Janaki Devi Bajaj, 86, Indian independence activist.
- Willy Berking, 68, German conductor, composer and trombonist, cancer.
- Paul L. Bolden, 56, American soldier.
- Jim Crowe, 70, Australian footballer.
- Bolesław Habowski, 64, Polish footballer.
- Blue Mitchell, 49, American jazz trumpeter and composer, cancer.
- Arthur D. Simons, 60, American soldier, leader of Operation Ivory Coast, heart failure.
- Walter Skelton, 96, Australian politician.
- Helen Sutermeister, 36, British archaeologist, lung cancer.

=== 22 ===
- Preben Christiansen, 65, Danish Olympic fencer (1936).
- John Friar, 67, Scottish footballer.
- Magdalena Galdikienė, 87, Lithuanian-American feminist activist.
- Henri Guissou, 68, Burkinabé diplomat and politician.
- William Hasebroock, 75, American politician, member of the Nebraska Legislature (since 1961).
- Reynold Henry Hillenbrand, 74, American Roman Catholic priest.
- Kurt Jooss, 78, German ballet dancer and choreographer, injuries sustained in a traffic collision.
- Bayya Suryanarayana Murthy, 72, Indian politician and writer.
- Martin A. Nelson, 90, American jurist and politician, stroke.
- Dick Upex, 86, English footballer.
- Avrom Yanovsky, 68, Russian-born Canadian graphic artist and cartoonist.

=== 23 ===
- Russell L. Caldwell, 74, American historian and community activist.
- Bob Chesnes, 58, American baseball player.
- Bill Dillon, 73, Irish footballer.
- Clyde Donaldson, 84, Australian footballer.
- Nora Dumas, 88–89, Hungarian photographer.
- Jeanne Ferrier, 91, French physicist.
- Stedman Shumway Hanks, 89, American aviator, airport engineer and writer.
- Joseph E. Leblanc, 62, Canadian politician.
- Romualdas Murauskas, 44, Soviet Olympic boxer (1956).
- Jan Paweł Nowacki, 73, Polish engineer.
- Hiroshi Ohshita, 56, Japanese baseball player.
- S. Selvanayagam, 46, Sri Lankan geographer.
- Hub van Doorne, 79, Dutch vehicle manufacturer and businessman.
- Albert Willetts, 79, New Zealand yacht designer and racer.

=== 24 ===
- Ronald Binny, 68, English cricketer.
- Charles F. Born, 76, American general.
- Sir Ernest Bullock, 88, English organist and composer.
- Albert W. Cretella, 82, American politician, member of the U.S. House of Representatives (1953–1959).
- Marvin Duchow, 64, Canadian composer and musicologist.
- Rustam Effendi, 76, Indonesian writer and politician.
- Len Hewitt, 59, Welsh footballer.
- André Luguet, 87, French actor.
- Daphne Alloway McVicker, 84, American writer.
- G. R. G. Mure, 86, British philosopher.
- Frank Henry Neely, 95, American engineer and businessman.
- M. Penn Phillips, 91, American businessman and real estate developer.
- Edmond Schmilovich, 57, Romanian-Israeli football player and manager.

=== 25 ===
- Desmond Clarke, 71–72, Irish writer and librarian.
- Austin Downes, 73, American football player.
- Amédée Gordini, 79, Italian-French racing driver and sports car manufacturer.
- Alan Hodge, 63, English historian and journalist.
- Stephanus Le Roux Marais, 83, South African composer.
- Henry Murray, 71, English cricketer.
- Joseph Normand, 84, French racing cyclist.
- John Spenkelink, 30, American convicted murderer, execution by electric chair.
- Georg Steinbacher, 68, German ornithologist.
- Notable victims of the American Airlines Flight 191 plane crash:
  - Itzhak Bentov, 55, Czechoslovak-born Israeli inventor and spiritualist
  - Leonard Stogel, 44, American record producer and music promoter
  - Judith Wax, 47, American author and essayist

=== 26 ===
- Stefano Ballarini, 76, Hungarian-American singer.
- Angus L. Bowmer, 74, American theatre director and actor.
- George Brent, 75, Irish-American actor (Jezebel, Dark Victory).
- Charles Cullum, 80, British actor.
- Tom Herron, 30, Northern Irish racing cyclist, racing crash.
- Mal James, 73, Australian footballer.
- Marianne Lindsten-Thomasson, 69, Swedish physician, cancer.
- S. M. Subbaiah Naidu, 65, Indian composer and conductor.
- Norman Denbigh Riley, 88, British entomologist.
- Lewis Stoker, 69, English footballer.

=== 27 ===
- Margot Benary-Isbert, 89, German-American children's author.
- Ahmed Ould Bouceif, 44–45, Mauritanian politician, prime minister (since 1979), plane crash.
- Norman Glaser, 84, American baseball player.
- Reg Grant, 46, Australian footballer.
- John Hall, 75, English cricketer.
- Jack Moran, 60, Australian footballer.
- Tommy Muirhead, 82, Scottish footballer.
- Mally Nydahl, 72, American football player and surgeon.
- Mabel MacFerran Rockwell, 77, American electrical engineer.
- Julian Vasey, 29, British Olympic skier (1968), traffic collision.
- Yao Zhe, 72, Chinese general.

=== 28 ===
- Michael Abercrombie, 66, British cell biologist.
- Jean-Baptiste Bottex, 60, Haitian painter.
- Consuelo de Saint-Exupéry, 78, Salvadoran-French writer and artist.
- Frank Fredrickson, 83, Canadian ice hockey player and aviator.
- Ingvar Garell, 77, Swedish tennis player.
- Oscar Andreas Ingebrigtsen, 76, Norwegian politician.
- Sig Jakucki, 69, American baseball player.
- Henry Johansson, 81, Swedish Olympic ice hockey player (1928).
- Lou Little, 87, American football player and coach.
- Tom Steele, 73, Scottish politician, MP (1945–1950, 1950–1970).
- Max von Moos, 75, Swiss painter.

=== 29 ===
- Beanie Berens, 66, American basketball player.
- Louis Einthoven, 83, Dutch lawyer and politician.
- Lavinia Engle, 87, American politician and suffragist, stroke.
- Marino Facchin, 66, Italian Olympic boxer (1936).
- Marynia F. Farnham, 79, American author and psychiatrist.
- Eddie Imazu, 81, Japanese-American production designer.
- John Macdonald, 71–72, British general.
- T. M. A. Pai, 81, Indian physician, educator and philanthropist.
- Mary Pickford, 87, Canadian-American actress (Coquette), complications from a stroke.
- Frank Sandon, 88, British Olympic swimmer (1912).
- Olive Templeton, 95, American actress.
- Gerald Tucker, 57, American basketball coach.
- Joyce Winifred Vickery, 70, Australian botanist.
- John H. Wood Jr., 63, American jurist, shot.

=== 30 ===
- Younis Bahri, 76, Iraqi writer, journalist and Nazi collaborator.
- Dom Callicrate, 93, American football player and coach.
- Peter Cape, 53, New Zealand singer.
- Clifford Dowdey, 75, American novelist, lung cancer.
- Donald Edward Lane, 69, American jurist.
- Fletcher Martin, 75, American painter, heart attack.
- Jack Raine, 82, English actor.
- Joe Smaza, 55, American baseball player.

=== 31 ===
- Charles Bradley, 76, American physician and psychiatrist.
- Sir Colin Callander, 82, British general.
- Djanira, 64, Brazilian artist, cardiac arrest.
- Francis Foster, 91, Australian politician.
- Nigel Howard, 54, English cricketer.
- Neil H. Jacoby, 69, Canadian-American academic administrator and economist, heart attack.
- Liu Yuzhong, 67–68, Taiwanese politician.
- Marcel Merminod, 86, Swiss actor.
- Ernest Perry, 87, English footballer.
- Scott Vincent, 56, American newscaster, lung cancer.
- John Wilcox, 66, British cinematographer (Dr. Who and the Daleks).
