= Richard Maynard =

Richard Maynard may refer to:

- Richard Maynard (television producer) (1942–2007), American educator, writer and television producer
- Richard Maynard (photographer) (1832–1907), British Columbia photographer
- Richard Maynard, a character in Moon Over Buffalo, a comedy by Ken Ludwig
- Richard Maynard, a character in Spooks (2002) played by Nicholas Farrell

== See also ==
- Dick Maynard (1897–1979), Australian footballer
