= Michael Hall (cricketer) =

English cricketer (1935–2019)

Personal information
- Full name: Michael John Hall
- Born: 29 May 1935; Worksop, Nottinghamshire, England
- Died: 10 August 2019 (aged 84); Retford, Nottinghamshire
- Batting: Right-handed
- Relatives: John Hall (father)

Domestic team information
- Years: Team
- 1958–1959: Nottinghamshire

Career statistics
| Competition | First-class |
|---|---|
| Matches | 17 |
| Runs scored | 430 |
| Batting average | 14.82 |
| 100s/50s | –/2 |
| Top score | 72 |
| Balls bowled | – |
| Wickets | – |
| Bowling average | – |
| 5 wickets in innings | – |
| 10 wickets in match | – |
| Best bowling | – |
| Catches/stumpings | 17/– |
- Source: Cricinfo, 8 March 2013

Michael John Hall (29 May 1935 – 10 August 2019), known as 'Mike', was an English cricketer. Hall was a right-handed batsman.

== Early life ==
Hall was the son of JB and Mary Hall and was born in Worksop, Nottinghamshire, with the family moving to Retford in 1949 when Hall was 14. He started his cricketing career in the First 11 for the Grammar School. His father John Hall also played first-class cricket.

== Cricketing career ==
Hall made his first-class debut for Nottinghamshire against Essex in the 1958 County Championship at the Garrison A Cricket Ground, Colchester, with him making a further eight first-class appearances in that season. The following season he made eight further first-class appearances for Nottinghamshire, the last of which came against Northamptonshire in the County Championship. In his total of seventeen first-class appearances, Hall scored a total of 430 runs at an average of 14.82, with a high score of 72. This score, one of two half centuries he made, came against Cambridge University in 1959, while his other half century, a score of 53, came against Hampshire in 1958.

Hall had a long association with Retford cricket club and also played for Bassetlaw League and Nottinghamshire County Cricket Club second team. During this time he coached a young Derek Randall. In 1992 he received lifetime membership at Retford Cricket Club in recognition of his services to the club, which was presented to him by umpire Harold Dickie Bird.

== Personal life ==
He married Mary in 1955 and had two sons - Chris and Nigel.
