= Antoinette Quinche =

- Born: 25 February 1896; Diesse, Switzerland
- Died: 13 May 1979 (aged 83); Lausanne, Switzerland
- Education: Gymnase de la Cité à Lausanne
- Occupations: Politician, Suffragist

Antoinette Quinche (1896–1979) was a Swiss feminist and politician (Free Democratic Party of Switzerland). She was president of the Schweizerische Aktionskomitee für Frauenstimmrecht (The Swiss women suffrage union) from 1932 to 1959.

== Biography ==
Quinche was born in Diesse, Switzerland on 25 February 1896. First woman to enter the Gymnase de la Cité à Lausanne. She went on to study law and become a lawyer.

In 1952, she and 1,414 other disputants from her community demanded to be entered into the voters' register. With the argument that the cantonal constitution at that time did not explicitly exclude women's voting rights, they went with their demand before the Federal Court. Again as in 1923, they were rejected by reference to Gewohnheitsrecht (customary law).

Quinche died in Lausanne, Switzerland on 13 May 1979.

== See also ==
- First women lawyers around the world
