= Lake Opeka =

Lake in Des Plaines, Illinois, United States

- Location within Illinois Location within the United States
- Location: Des Plaines, Illinois
- Coordinates: 42°00′46″N 87°53′48″W
- Basin countries: United States
- Surface area: 40 acres (16 ha)
- Surface elevation: 630 ft (192 m)

Lake Opeka is a small, 40 acres (16 ha) lake in Des Plaines, Illinois. It is located in the Des Plaines Park District's 76-acre Lake Park.

The man-made lake was created out of what had been farmland to provide dirt for the construction of nearby Interstate 90 (the Jane Addams Tollway). According to a sign at Lake Park, it took two years for 2 million gallons of spring-fed water to fill the lake.

After the highway was completed, the Des Plaines Park District acquired 60 acres including the new lake for $1 in 1957, and opened Lake Park in 1961.

In subsequent years, the park district acquired several parcels of land that had been owned by Good Shepherd Lutheran Church, which was located on the northern bank of the lake. In 2021, the church closed and sold its building to the park district. The building was converted into a restaurant, which opened in 2023.

== Recreation ==
Lake Park surrounds Lake Opeka and offers outdoor recreation as well as an 18-hole par-3 golf course. Jogging paths run around the east side of the park, where a band shelter is located amongst picnic tables and grills, exercise stations and a playground. The southern end has a volleyball sand pit.

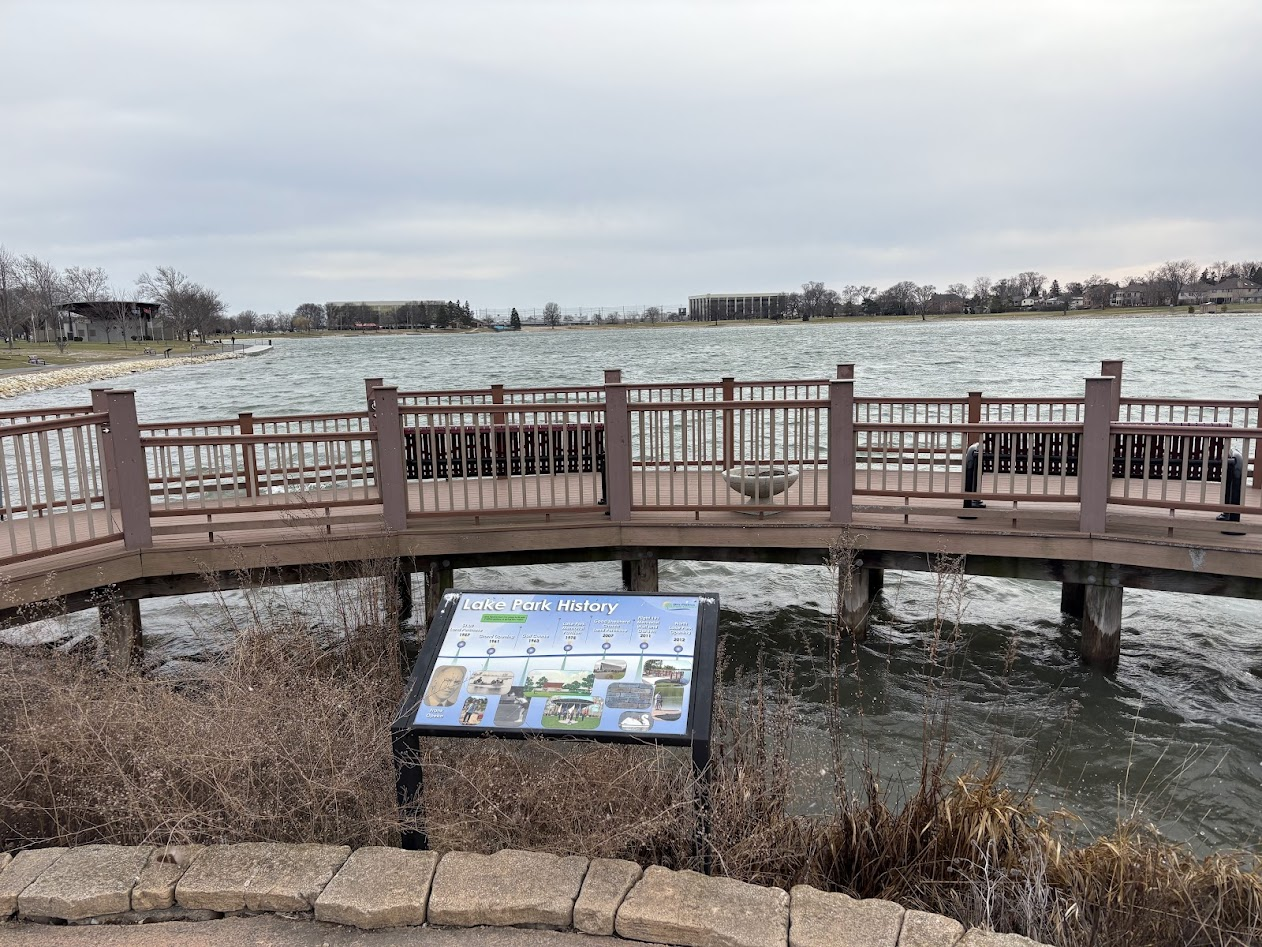
Memorial Pavilion at Lake Park

Fishing is allowed. Bass, bluegill and occasional northern pike are caught. There are small sailboats and paddleboats using the lake. Many ducks are on the water, some large carp and occasional turtles.

460 man-hours were spent removing submerged and surface vegetation from the lake, to prevent its becoming a threat to aquatic life (due to its using up the oxygen supply when decomposing). The vegetation consisted of the native slender naiad (Najas flexilis), and an excessive amount of filamentous algae.

== Memorials at Lake Park ==
Lake Park is home to a Memorial Pavilion, which includes several veterans memorials honoring servicemembers from Des Plaines from the Civil War until today.

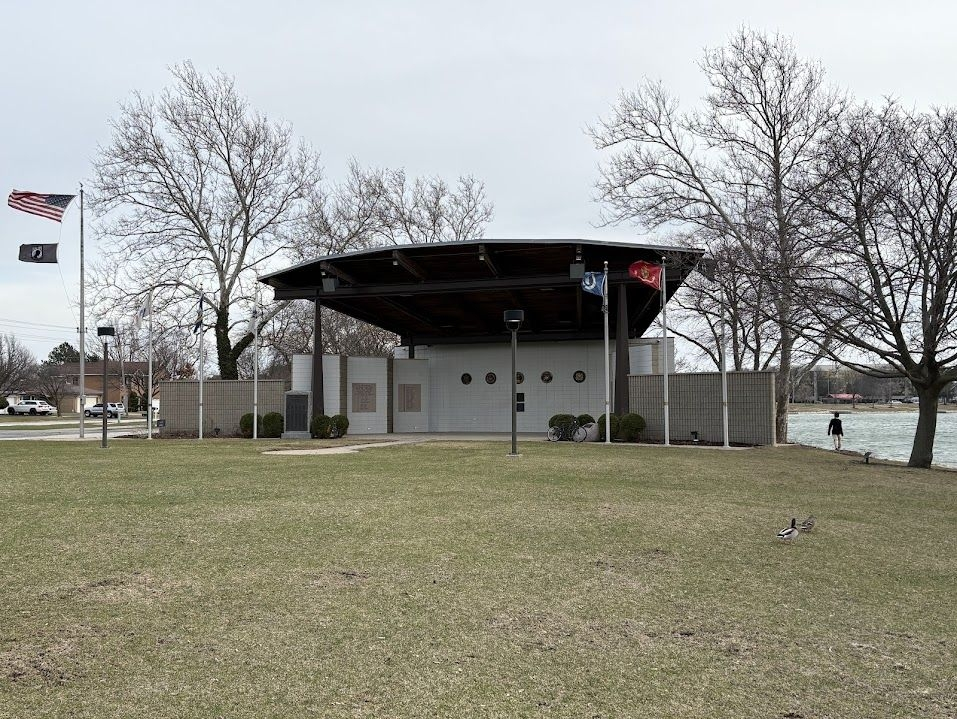
Lake Park's Memorial Pavilion

On the south end of the park is a memorial to American Airlines Flight 191. On May 25, 1979, a DC-10 crashed shortly after takeoff into an open field about 1¾ miles west of this memorial. The crash killed 271 passengers and two people on the ground, making it the deadliest aviation accident (not including those caused by terrorism) in American history. The memorial to the crash was erected in 2011.
