= Baert Lake =

- Christmas Valley Lake
- Location of Baert Lake in Oregon Baert Lake (the United States)
- Location: Lake County, Oregon, United States
- Coordinates: 43°14′27″N 120°41′15″W
- Type: Reservoir
- Basin countries: United States
- Managing agency: Christmas Valley Park and Recreation District
- Surface area: 26.2 acres (10.6 ha)
- Shore length^{1}: 2 miles (3.2 km)
- Surface elevation: 4,318 feet (1,316 m)
- ^{1} Shore length is not a well-defined measure.

Baert Lake is a small artificial lake in the unincorporated community of Christmas Valley in the U.S. state of Oregon. Managed by the Christmas Valley Park and Recreation District, the lake is used for fishing, boating, and swimming from spring through autumn and for ice skating in winter if the ice is thick enough.

An earlier name for the lake was Christmas Valley Lake. It covers 26.2 acres (10.6 ha) and has a shoreline of 2 miles (3.2 km). Part of the lake borders the Christmas Valley Golf Course.

== See also ==
- List of lakes in Oregon
