= Helen Sutermeister =

Canadian historian

- Born: 14 January 1943; Bangor, Caernarvonshire, U.K.
- Died: 21 May 1979; Chester, U.K.
- Occupation: Archaeologist

Helen Joan Sutermeister (14 January 1943 – 21 May 1979) was a British historian and archaeologist involved in the program of Industrial Archaeology in Ontario. Sutermeister was Curatorial Assistant in the Canadiana Department of Royal Ontario Museum, and was a founding member of the Norwich Survey within the Centre of East Anglian Studies.

== Early life and education ==
Sutermeister was born in Bangor, the younger daughter of Carl Sutermeister and Ruth Davies Sutermeister. Her father was a Swiss cotton broker. She graduated from St. Anne's College, Oxford.

== Career ==
Sutermeister was Curatorial Assistant in the Canadiana Department of Royal Ontario Museum. She directed the excavation of "Canada's first iron foundry" at Normandale in 1968. She was a founding member of the Norwich Survey within the Centre of East Anglian Studies.

== Publications ==
- "An 18th-Century Urban Estate in New France" (1968)
- "Excavations on the Site of the Tudor Manor House at Micheldever, Hampshire" (1975)
- "Excavations in Norwich 1971–1978, Part I" (1982, with Malcolm Atkin, Peter Donaldson, J. P. Roberts, and Alan Carter)

== Personal life and legacy ==
After returning from graduate school in Canada, Sutermeister married archivist Frank Ian Dunn in 1973. The couple restored a 15th-century home at Hales Green in rural Norfolk. Sutermeister died from lung cancer at age 36, in 1979, in Chester. Since her early death, the Helen Sutermeister Memorial Fund was created and Helen Sutermeister Memorial Lectures are given at the Centre of East Anglian Studies of the University of East Anglia.
