= Christmas Valley, Oregon =

Unincorporated community in Oregon, United States

- Unincorporated community
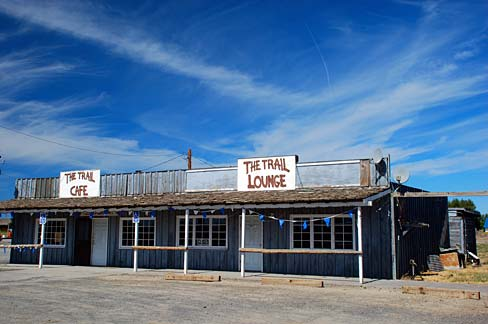
- Old building in Christmas Valley

- Location within Oregon Location within the United States
- Coordinates: 43°14′11″N 120°38′13″W
- Country: United States
- State: Oregon
- County: Lake
- Elevation: 4,321 ft (1,317 m)

Population (2010)
  - Total: 1,313
- Time zone: UTC-8 (Pacific)
  - Summer (DST): UTC-7 (Pacific)
- ZIP code: 97641
- GNIS feature ID: 1136149

Christmas Valley is an unincorporated community in Lake County, Oregon, United States. The community was named after nearby Christmas Lake, usually dry, east of the present town and the site of the former Lake post office, which ran from 1906 until 1943. Real estate development around a planned community by M. Penn Phillips, called Christmas Valley, started after World War II. The Christmas Valley post office was established in 1963 as a rural station of Silver Lake.

== History ==
Christmas Lake, Christmas (Lake) Valley, and nearby Peter's Sink and Peter's Creek were named for pioneer stockman Peter Christman, who grazed his cattle there and had a house at Silver Lake, 18 miles (29 km) to the southwest. These names were applied as early as September 29, 1877, when they were referred to by former Oregon Governor John Whiteaker in a letter to the editor of the Eugene City Guard. Whiteaker himself had an interest in the fossil beds at nearby Fossil Lake, and ranching interests in the area as well.

The name "Christmas" was an early corruption of the name Christman that became entrenched in the vernacular by 1900. The Christman family often spelled their name with a T although some family members would omit it and use the name Chrisman. Several examples of both spellings were found in print, some in government documents. Whiteaker himself referred to the lake as both "Christman Lake" and "Christmas Lake" in his letter to the editor, and unmistakably pinpointed the lake's location.

=== Penn Phillips era ===
In 1961, developer M. Penn Phillips laid out the townsite, including its fanciful holiday street names (such as Candy Lane, Mistletoe Road, Comet Street, Vixen Street, etc.), the Christmas Valley Airport, a water system, a golf course, a lodge, rodeo grounds, and an artificial lake originally named Christmas Valley Lake and now called Baert Lake. Phillips aggressively promoted the community in California to young, would-be farmers and retirees; often providing free bus tours and flights and marketing the potential of the land as green and readily farmed. The company quickly sold out the parcels, though despite Phillips' claims that the community would soon have more than 5,000 residents, few actually moved there. In 1966, in an Oregon Tax Court decision about tax valuation of Christmas Lake property, Judge Edward Howell opined, "the land, at least in its present condition, is arid, dusty, windy, isolated, [and] subject to temperature extremes." In the early 1970s, the Phillips company faced lawsuits about misrepresentation of the property and the Phillips era is usually considered a scam.

== Climate ==
This region experiences hot and dry summers, with yearly average temp of 71 °F (22 °C). Very hot summers and very cold nights and winters with snow, that skew average temps. Normal highs in summers are above 90 °F (32 °C) with nights dipping into the teens and winter record of low −40 °F (−40 °C). The average winter low is 19 °F (−7 °C) and high 37 °F (3 °C). According to the Köppen Climate Classification system, Christmas Valley has a warm-summer Mediterranean climate, abbreviated "Csb" on climate maps.

== Economy ==
Christmas Valley is largely an alfalfa farming community. The community has a number of commercial businesses including three grocery stores, two motels, four restaurants, and a gas station. Bakery and two car repairs, Credit Union, Medical clinic and a dental clinic building. An EV Charging Station at the hardware store. Airport and 9 hole golf course.

A nine-hole golf course is maintained by Christmas Valley Park and Recreation District, as is the Christmas Valley Airport, Rodeo Grounds, Community Hall, Baert Lake and the community's twice monthly publication, Desert Whispers.

=== Military ===
The Christmas Valley Air Force Station was an over-the-horizon radar station that was deactivated in 2002.

== Tourism ==
Christmas Valley is near Fort Rock–Christmas Lake Valley basin, Fort Rock, Four Craters Lava Field, and Crack in the Ground.

The community is perhaps best known by off-road all-terrain vehicle enthusiasts worldwide who ride in the Christmas Valley Sand Dunes. Near the Sand Dunes, Lost Forest, Thousands of Acres of Ponderosa Pines.

== Education ==
Christmas Valley students are served by the North Lake School District.
