= Christmas Valley Airport =

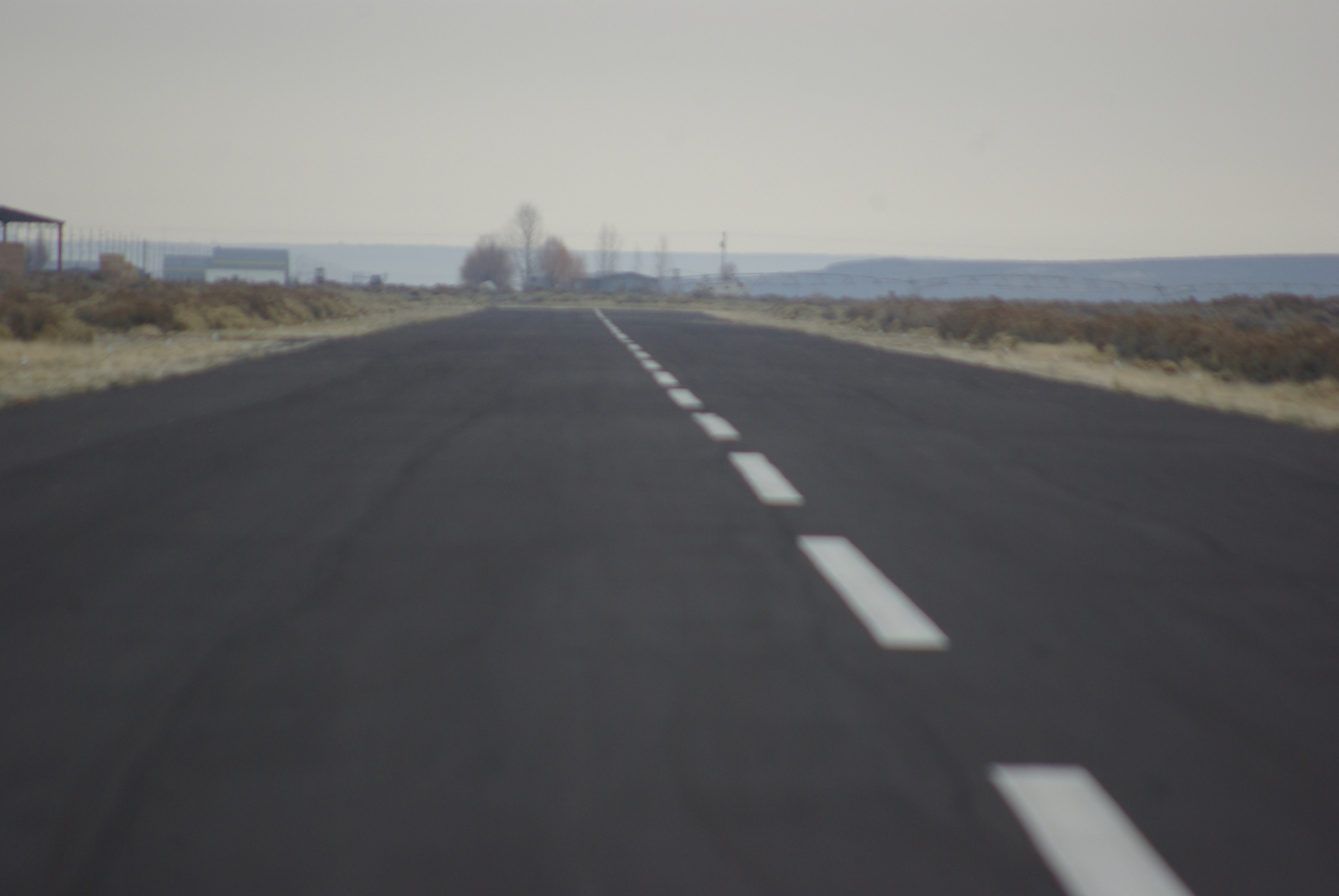
- IATA: none; ICAO: 62S; FAA LID: 62S

Summary
- Airport type: Public
- Operator: Christmas Valley Parks & Recreation
- Location: Christmas Valley, Oregon
- Elevation AMSL: 4,317 ft / 1,316 m
- Coordinates: 43°14′12″N 120°39′58″W
- Interactive map of Christmas Valley Airport

Runways
Direction	Length		Surface
Direction	ft	m	Surface
7/25	5,200	1,585	Asphalt

Christmas Valley Airport (FAA LID: 62S) is located 1 m (2 km) southeast of Christmas Valley, Oregon, United States.

The airport consists of a 60' (18m) wide runway with a segmented circle marked by white tires and a medium-intensity runway lighting system which allows 25 minutes for landing once an aircraft is on beam and activates the system. Pilot activates the Runway Edge Lights: RY 7/25 - Common Traffic Advisory Frequency (CTAF). Tie-downs are available but at this time there are no fuel or oxygen services onsite. Two single engine aircraft are based on the field. The airstrip is unattended and open for public use.

== History ==
Established in 1962, the airport was intended to promote land development. The runway was built as part of the original development of the town and dedicated in 1985. A recent $500,000 grant from the Federal Aviation Administration widened, paved, and lit the mile-long airstrip.
