= Benjamin P. Sandler =

- Born: Benjamin Pincus Sandler; 7 September 1901
- Died: 18 May 1979 (aged 77); Asheville, North Carolina
- Occupation: Physician

Benjamin Pincus Sandler (7 September 1901 – 18 May 1979) was an American physician, anti-sugar activist and low-carbohydrate diet advocate.

== Career ==
Sandler served in the Navy Medical Corps in the early 1940s. He left the Navy with the rank of Commander in 1947 and was Captain of the United States Navy Reserve until 1963. He was a physician at Oteen Veterans Hospital in North Carolina in 1948 and remained with the hospital until his retirement in 1972.

In the 1940s, Sandler argued that polio was caused by refined sugars, sugar-sweetened beverages such as Coca-Cola or ice cream. He drew his conclusion from discredited experiments involving rabbits and the observation that polio outbreaks occurred in the summer when children had increased their intake of sugary foods. Sandler stated that a normal blood sugar level will prevent the poliovirus and that a low-carbohydrate diet could boost the immunity of the body against polio. His results were not replicated by the scientific community. In 1941, the University of Michigan attempted to duplicate Sandler's findings without success.

James H. Cherry, president of the Buncombe County Medical Society dismissed Sandler's theory, stating that "We feel Dr. Sandler’s theory is absolutely without foundation... We do not feel that reducing the intake of soft drinks, pastries, and other sweets has been proved to have any effect on the immunity of the human body against polio". Sandler wrote two books developing his low-carbohydrate ideas, Diet Prevents Polio and How to Prevent Heart Attacks. They were published by the Lee Foundation for Nutritional Research. Sandler was an anti-sugar activist and campaigned against the consumption of sweets in North Carolina.

Sandler also argued that sugar causes heart attacks and recommended a high-fat low-carbohydrate diet consisting of butter, cheese, eggs, meat and nuts. He described sugar as a "toxic substance". He recommended eggs for breakfast and attacked the sugar industry. In 1971, Sandler stated that he was planning to conduct a nationwide experiment to show the danger of eating sugar.

== Death ==
Sandler died after a long illness in Asheville, North Carolina, aged 77.

== Selected publications ==
- Diet Prevents Polio (1951)
- How to Prevent Heart Attacks (1958)
