= Oteen Veterans Administration Hospital Historic District =

Historic district in North Carolina, United States

- U.S. National Register of Historic Places
- U.S. Historic district
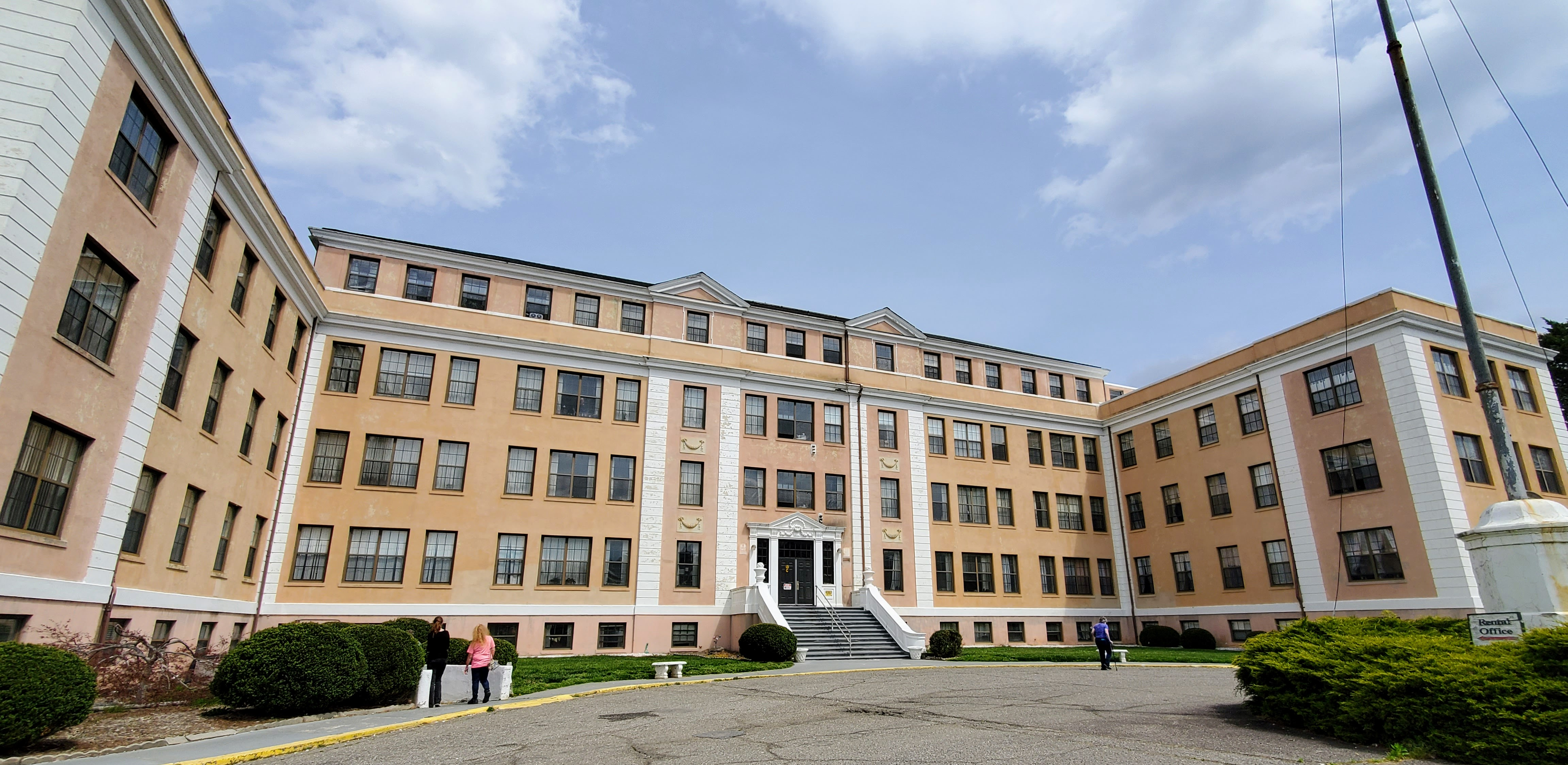
- Oteen Veterans Hospital Administration Building, 2021

- Location within North Carolina Location within the United States
- Location: N side of US 70, Asheville, North Carolina
- Coordinates: 35°35′27″N 82°29′05″W
- Area: 30 acres (12 ha)
- Built: 1924-1940
- Built by: Veterans Administration; Rose, W. P. Co.
- Architectural style: Colonial Revival, Georgian Revival
- NRHP reference No.: 85003529
- Added to NRHP: November 20, 1985

Oteen Veterans Administration Hospital Historic District is a historic hospital complex and national historic district located at Asheville, Buncombe County, North Carolina. The district encompasses 18 contributing buildings and 1 contributing structure associated with the Veterans' Administration hospital at Asheville. They were built between 1924 and 1940, and include white frame Colonial Revival and massive yellow stucco Georgian Revival structures. Notable buildings include the Administration Building (1928), Wards A and B (1925), Wards C and D (1930), Wards E and F (1932), Kitchen (1926) and Dining Hall (1930), Officers' Quarters (1927), and Nurses Dormitories (1930 and 1932). In 1967, a new Asheville, VA Medical Center complex was built adjacent to the original.

It was listed on the National Register of Historic Places in 1985.

== Gallery ==
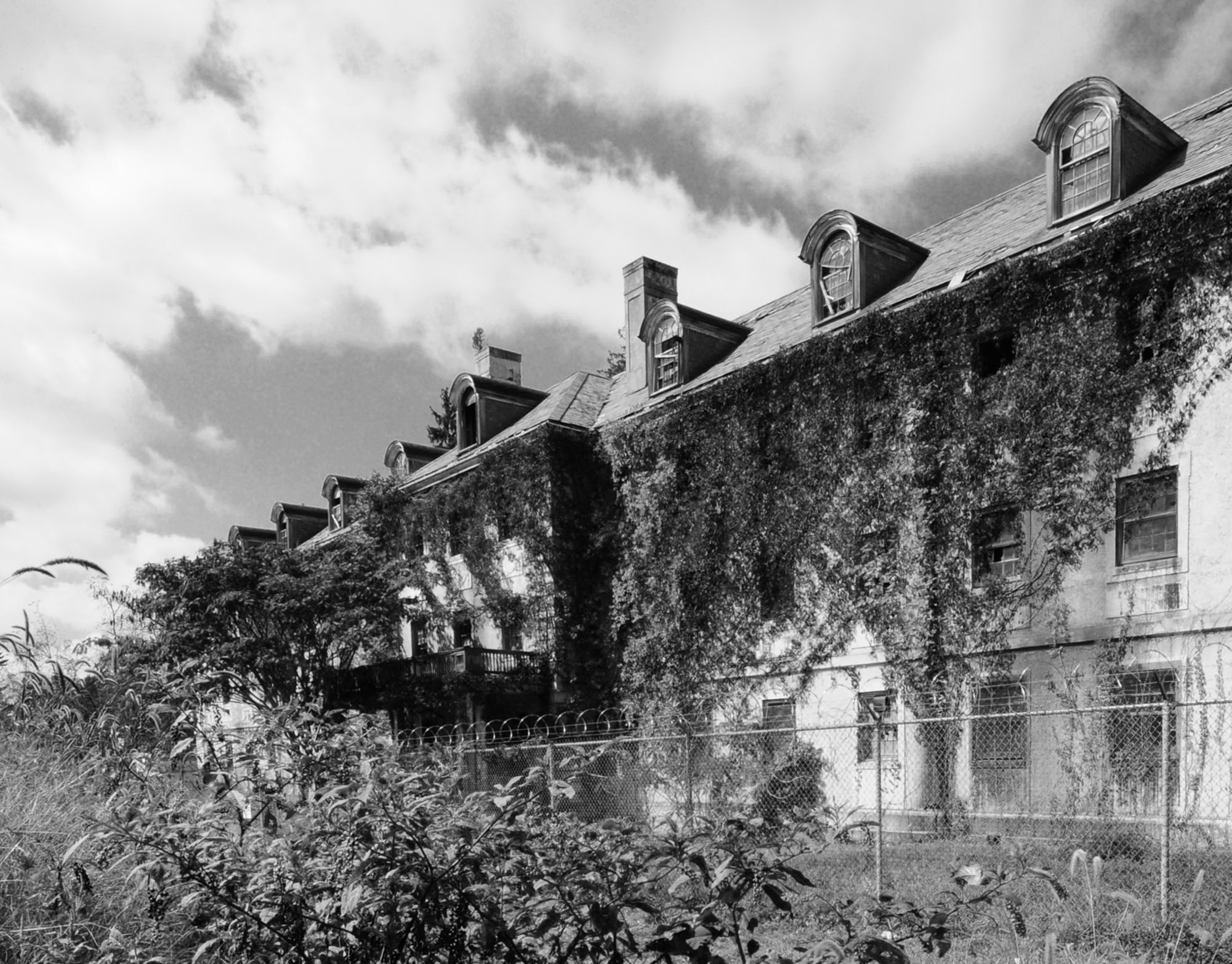
Oteen Veterans Administration Hospital, 2012

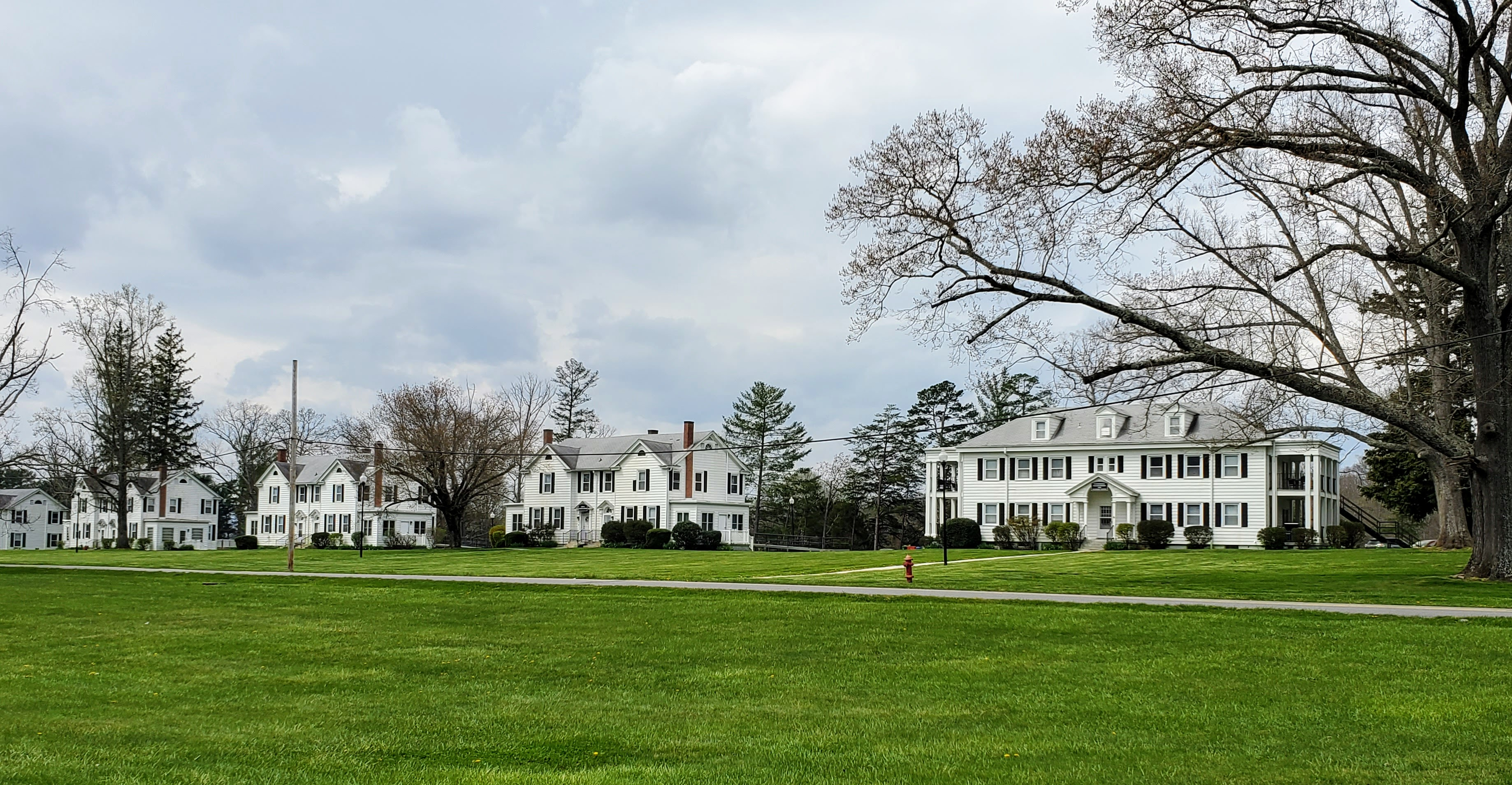
Oteen Veterans Hospital Officers Quarters, 2021

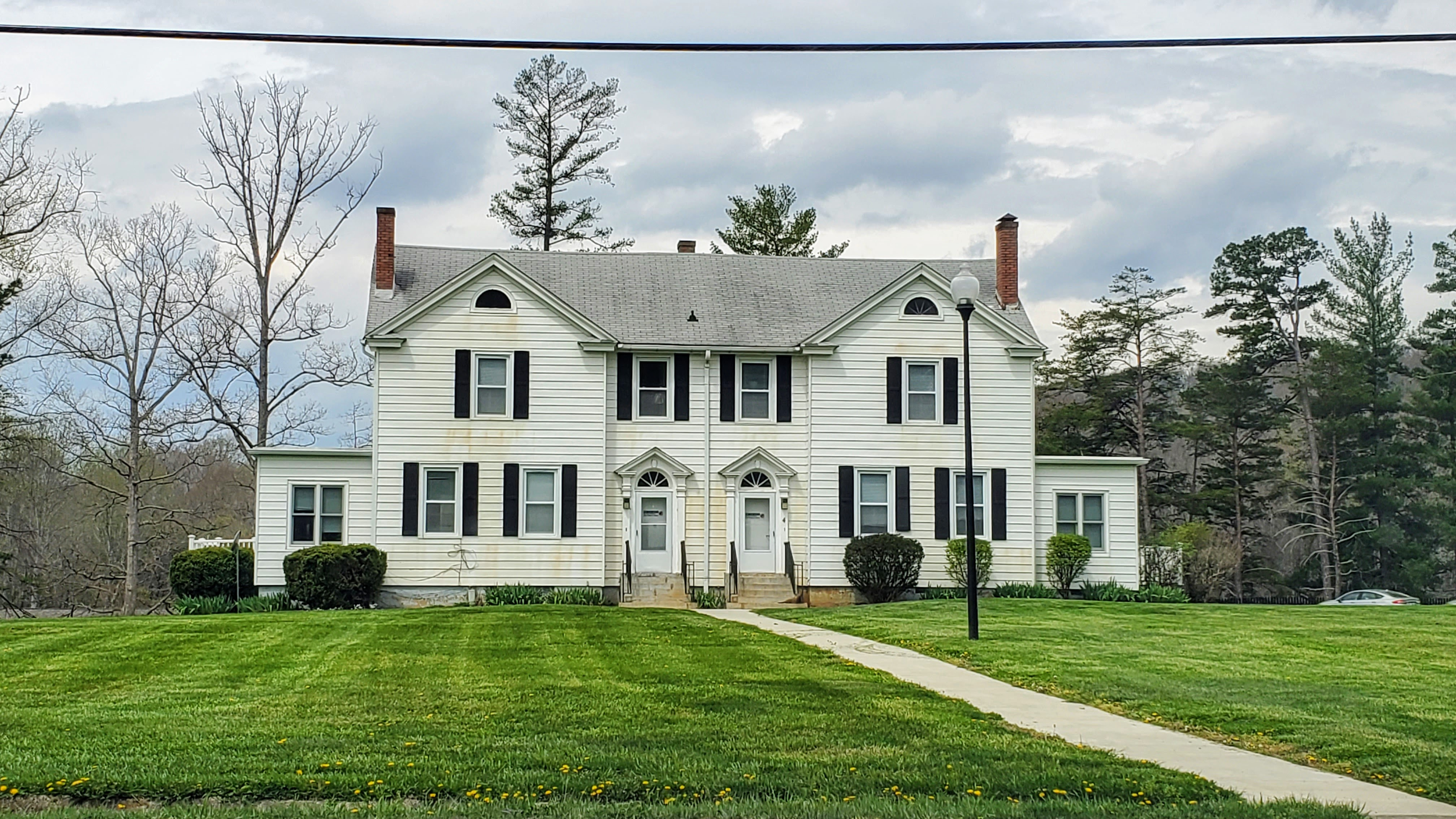
Oteen Veterans Hospital Officers Quarters, 2021
