= Carl Gunne =

Swedish painter

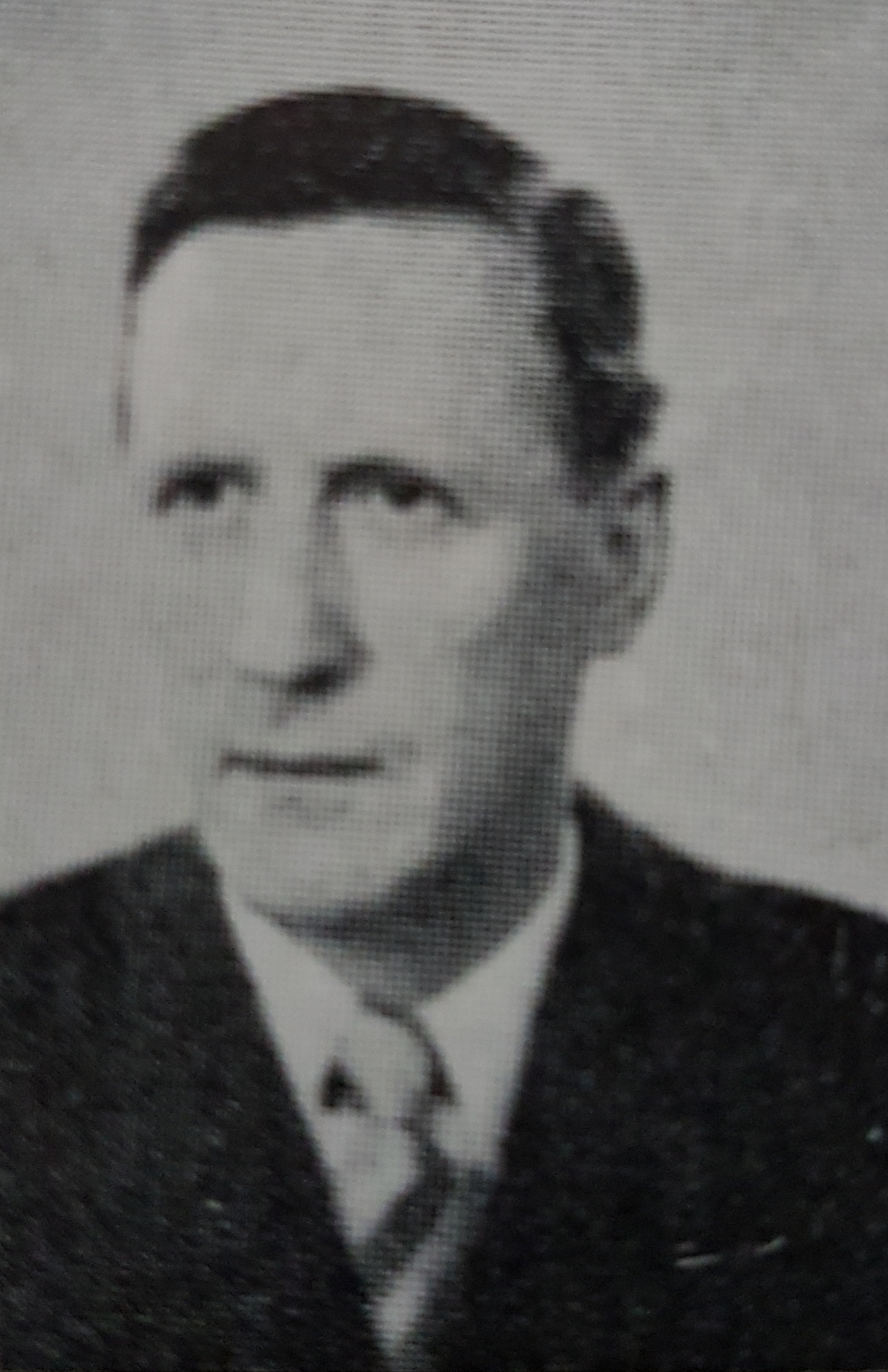
- Born: 29 September 1893; Sundsvall, Sweden
- Died: 3 May 1979 (aged 85); Stockholm, Sweden
- Occupation: Painter

Carl Gunne (29 September 1893 – 3 May 1979) was a Swedish painter. His work was part of the painting event in the art competition at the 1936 Summer Olympics.
