= Alan Story =

Australian rules footballer (1913–1979)

Personal information
- Full name: Alan Story
- Born: 10 November 1913
- Died: 10 May 1979 (aged 65)
- Original team: Warburton / Scotch College
- Height: 185 cm (6 ft 1 in)
- Weight: 85 kg (187 lb)

Playing career^{1}
Years	Club	Games (Goals)
1932, 1935, 1942–1944	Hawthorn	15 (5)
- ^{1} Playing statistics correct to the end of 1944.

Alan Story (10 November 1913 – 10 May 1979) was an Australian rules footballer who played with the Hawthorn Football Club in the Victorian Football League (VFL).
