= Marianne Lindsten-Thomasson =

Swedish physician (1909–1979)

Marianne Charlotte Lindsten-Thomasson
- Born: Marianne Charlotte Lindsten; 6 October 1909; Mora, Sweden
- Died: 26 May 1979 (aged 69); Lycksele, Sweden
- Burial place: Gamla kyrkogården
- Education: University of Lund
- Occupation: Physician
- Known for: First female district medical officer during the 1940s
- Children: 7

Marianne Charlotte Lindsten-Thomasson (6 October 1909 – 26 May 1979) was a Swedish physician and a pioneer member of the Medical Women's International Association, which was set up in 1919. She was the country's first female district medical officer during the 1940s.

== Life and work ==
Marianne Charlotte Lindstén was born in Mora in 1909 as the eldest child of a teacher in a farming family in Gothenburg. She attended Landskrona gymnasia for her early education, graduating in 1927 and went on to finish her medical degree at the University of Lund (1930) thus becoming a general practitioner. She earned her medical licentiate in 1936. At first, she filled in for other doctors who went on leave in various hospitals and had a difficult time finding a permanent position. At that time, there were very few female doctors working in Sweden, which added another barrier to her employment.

As a young woman doctor, she attended to the unique needs of her female patients. According to Thomasson: "She was able to understand female medical issues in an entirely different way from her older male predecessors. She wrote prescriptions for diaphragms unlike her colleague who believed that the relevant couples should “just desist,” and her actions thus probably prevented some women from having between ten and fifteen children, which was the norm at that time."

Eventually, she was hired in Vilhelmina, Southern Lapland, and worked there steadily for ten years. In 1950, she met and married the widower Erik Thomasson who had five children aged between 5 and 16. Her new husband was a district judge who lived 120 kilometres (75 mi) from Vilhelmina. She took over the care of his children, with the help of a nanny, and continued her medical practice by commuting between the two cities. Soon, she had two children of her own, a boy born in 1952 and a girl born in 1954.

In 1955, when one of the two district medical officer posts in Lycksele became vacant, Lindsten-Thomasson got the job. Her new area of responsibility was geographically smaller than Vilhelmina but more heavily populated requiring her to be on call around the clock every day of the year.

She retired in 1972 but did not stop working. Instead she set up a small office in her home where she received young people who needed medical reports to gain their driver’s licenses. She also ran a small clinic for alcoholics and a home for the elderly, and she served as the physician for the employees of the Swedish national railway.

In the 1979 Lindsten-Thomasson died from cancer, aged 69 and is buried at Gamla kyrkogården (the old cemetery) in Lycksele.
