= Mykola Nedilko =

Ukrainian painter (1902–1979)

- Микола Неділко
- Born: November 23, 1902; Ushchenivka, Russian Empire (depopulated by the Holodomor, now Bairak, Sumy Oblast, Ukraine)
- Died: May 12, 1979 (aged 76); Glen Cove, New York, United States
- Occupation: painter
- Known for: Landscape painting
- Style: expressionism, post-impressionism
- Spouse: Oksana Chumak

Mykola Semenovych Nedilko (Ukrainian: Микола Семенович Неділко; 23 November 1902 – 12 May 1979) was a Ukrainian painter.

== Biography ==
Mykola was born on November 23, 1902 in the village of Ushchenivka. His father, Semen Nedilko, was a village doctor. His mother, Sofia, came from the Murashko family. In 1926, Mykola Nedilko graduated from the Ukrainian Art Institute in Kyiv, where he studied under Fedir Krychevsky, Mykhailo Boychuk and Lev Kramarenko.

Mykola Nedilko refused the demands of the Soviet regime to conform to the requirements of socialist realism and was imprisoned for two years. After his release, he worked for ten years as a set designer and artist at the State Opera and Musical Comedy Theatre in Kyiv. In the spring of 1929, he married Oksana Chumak, a singer in the Kiev operetta. In 1940, Nedilko, together with Mykola Azovskyi and Mykhailo Dmytrenko, was sent by the artists' union to Lviv, which was occupied by the Soviet army. To avoid recruitment into the Red Army, he was hiding in June 1941. After the withdrawal of Soviet troops in 1941, he remained in the city, joined the Association of Ukrainian Artists and took part in its exhibitions.

Concerned about the return of the Bolsheviks, Nedilko and his wife emigrated to Germany. From 1944 to 1948 he lived in the “Orlyk” Displaced Persons camp near Berchtesgaden. The painter took part in exhibitions of Ukrainian artists in Munich in 1947 and Regensburg in 1948. In 1948 Nedilko moved to Buenos Aires and in 1961 to New York.

In addition to actively participating in group exhibitions, Mykola Nedilko had numerous solo exhibitions: in New York (1962, 1965, 1966, 1980), Paris (1965), Philadelphia (1966, 1982) and Edmonton (1983). Mykola Nedilko is known primarily for his expressionistic landscapes, which he usually painted en plein air. His post-impressionistic oil paintings are based on strong contrasts of light, shadow and color.

Mykola Nedilko died at the age of 76 in a hospital in Glen Cove and was buried in the Bound Brook Cemetery.

== Painting (selection) ==
- On the Dnister / На Дністрі(1942)
- Lemko Church / Лемківська церква (1943)
- Boden lake / Боденське озеро (1948)
- Argentinian landscape / Пейзаж з Аргентини (1956)
- The Ande / Анди (1958)
- Willow on the lake / Верби над озером (1959)
- Catskill Mountains / Кетскільські гори (1964)
- Boats / Човни (1965)
- Sunflowers / Соняшники (1976)
