= Phebe Florence Miller =

- Born: July 8, 1889; Topsail, Newfoundland
- Died: May 18, 1979 (aged 89); Topsail, Newfoundland and Labrador
- Writing career
- Genres: poetry, diary

Phebe Florence Miller (July 8, 1889 – May 18, 1979) was a Canadian writer and nature lover, one of Newfoundland's first serious woman writers.

== Biography ==
The daughter of Emma Allen and Joseph Miller, she was born in Topsail, Newfoundland and was educated at the Methodist school there. In 1907, she began work as a government telegraph operator in Topsail. In 1928, she became the local postmistress, retiring in 1942. Miller was organist for the Topsail United Church well into her eighties.

Miller won first prize in Dr. Chase's Almanac Great Diary Contest in 1920 and tied for first place in the same contest in 1921 and 1924. She composed verses for greeting cards published by companies such as Rust Craft, Hall Brothers of Kansas City (later Hallmark Cards), A. M. Davis Co and Gibson Art Company. Her radio programme Songs of Seven was broadcast on Pittsburgh station KDKA in 1926. In 1929, she published a book of poetry In Caribou Land with a foreword by E. J. Pratt. Miller also contributed poetry to newspapers such as The Evening Telegram and Newfoundland Quarterly.

Miller's home in Topsail became a literary salon, attracting both published and novice writers. The title poem from In Caribou Land appeared in textbooks used in Newfoundland schools for a number of years.

She died in Topsail at the age of 89. She is buried in the Topsail United Church Cemetery.

Miller's papers are held at the Centre for Newfoundland Studies. Her literary career is described in Mistress of the Blue Castle: The Writing Life of Phebe Florence Miller.

== Awards and honours ==
- 1920, First prize, Dr. Chase's Almanac Great Diary Contest
- 1921 and 1924, tied for first place, Dr. Chase's Almanac Great Diary Contest
