= Alf Crump =

Australian rules footballer

Personal information
- Full name: Alf Crump
- Born: 7 August 1922
- Died: 2 May 1979 (aged 56)
- Original team: North Colts
- Height: 185 cm (6 ft 1 in)
- Weight: 84 kg (185 lb)
- Position: Forward

Playing career^{1}
Years	Club	Games (Goals)
1942–1948	North Melbourne	84 (83)
- ^{1} Playing statistics correct to the end of 1948.

Alf Crump (7 August 1922 – 2 May 1979) was an Australian rules footballer who played for the North Melbourne Football Club in the Victorian Football League (VFL).
