= Schweizerische Aktionskomitee für Frauenstimmrecht =

Swiss women's suffrage organisation

Schweizerische Aktionskomitee für Frauenstimmrecht (Swiss Action Committee for Women's Suffrage ), was a women's organization in Switzerland, founded in 1945.

It was one of the main women's suffrage organisations in Switzerland, during the last decades before the introduction of women's suffrage in 1971. It was established in 1945 as an opinion-forming instrument.
