= Reg Grant (footballer) =

Australian rules footballer (1932–1979)

Personal information
- Full name: Reg Grant
- Born: 16 December 1932
- Died: 27 May 1979 (aged 46)
- Original team: West Melbourne
- Height: 178 cm (5 ft 10 in)
- Weight: 72 kg (159 lb)

Playing career^{1}
Years	Club	Games (Goals)
1953–55	North Melbourne	16 (8)
- ^{1} Playing statistics correct to the end of 1955.

Reg Grant (16 December 1932 – 27 May 1979) was an Australian rules footballer who played with North Melbourne in the Victorian Football League (VFL).
