= Hales Green Common =

Common in England

- Interactive map of Hales Green Common
- Type: common land
- Location: Norfolk
- Coordinates: 52.5152°N 1.4972°E
- Open: All year

Hales Green Common is an area of open access common land situated in South Norfolk, England. Hales Green Common has been described by Norfolk Wildlife Trust as neutral grassland. In addition to being one of six registered commons in South Norfolk Hales Green is also a designated county wildlife site (CWS)
