= Hunt Davies =

- Full name: David Henry Davies
- Born: 11 November 1896 Aberavon, Wales
- Died: 8 May 1979 (aged 82) Cimla, Neath, Wales

Rugby union career
- Position: Centre
International career
| Years | Team | Apps | (Points) |
| 1924 | Wales | 1 | (0) |

David Henry "Hunt" Davies (11 November 1896 – 8 May 1979) was a Welsh international rugby union player.

Davies had to play his rugby in a reinforced boot due to a war injury.

A centre, Davies won five consecutive Welsh championships playing with a dominant Aberavon side and was capped once for Wales, appearing against England at Swansea during the 1924 Five Nations.

== See also ==
- List of Wales national rugby union players
