= Florence Ellen Hewitt =

South African botanist, algologist and teacher

- Born: 1 September 1910; Makhanda, South Africa
- Died: 20 May 1979 (aged 68); Pretoria, South Africa
- Occupations: botanist, algologist

Florence Ellen Hewitt (1 September 1910, Grahamstown – 20 May 1979, Pretoria) was a South African botanist, algologist and teacher, daughter of John Hewitt, curator of the Albany Museum from 1910 to 1948.

== Life and career ==
Florence Ellen Hewitt was born on 1 September 1910 in Grahamstown. Her father John Hewitt was a herpetologist, curator of the Albany Museum from 1910 to 1948 and founding member of the South African Museums Association.

Hewitt was educated at Rhodes University graduating as Bachelor and Master of Sciences. She studied under G. F. Papenfuss at Berkeley, California, and published “A morphological study of three South African Gigartinales” in University California Publishing.

From 1931 to 1937, Hewitt taught biology at D.S.G Grahamstown, from 1938 to 1939 – in England. From 1941 until her retirement in 1970, she taught biology and general science at Wynberg Girls’ High School in Cape Town.

In 1956–1957, she participated in educational exchange under the auspices of American private agencies by the year for the Union of South Africa at the University of California, Berkeley. During the educational exchange at the University of California Hewitt conducted a research in techniques employed in study of the comparative morphology of South African seaweeds.

From 1972 to 1977, Hewitt worked as a temporary assistant under Mr. R. H. Simons for the Seaweed Research Unit of the Division of Sea Fisheries, having collected over 100 seaweeds, incorporated in R.H. Simon's collection.

Florence Ellen Hewitt died on 20 May 1979 in Pretoria.

== Works ==
- 1955 – Studies of Hypnea spicifera. Rhodes University Editor
- 1960 – A Morphological Study of Three South African Gigantinales. Vols. 32-33 from Univ. Of California Berkeley, Calif: publications in botany. Editor Univ. Of California Press, 30 pp
- 1976 – Marine Algae from Southern Africa: 2. Morphology and Taxonomy of Five Foliaceous Florideophyceae (Rhodophyta). Investigational report 110. With RH Simons. Editor Rep. Of South Africa, Dep. Of Industries, Sea Fisheries Branch, 46 pp.

== Taxon names authored ==
- Callophycus africanus
- Iridaea convoluta
