= Henry Murray (cricketer) =

English cricketer and soldier

Personal information
- Full name: Henry Lade Murray
- Born: 31 May 1907; British India
- Died: 25 May 1979 (aged 71); Tonbridge, Kent, England
- Batting: Left-handed
- Bowling: Left-arm medium

Domestic team information
- Years: Team
- 1936/37–1938/39: Europeans

Career statistics
Competition	First-class
Matches	6
Runs scored	61
Batting average	7.62
100s/50s	–/–
Top score	18
Balls bowled	1,001
Wickets	21
Bowling average	21.95
5 wickets in innings	1
10 wickets in match	–
Best bowling	5/35
Catches/stumpings	–/–
- Source: ESPNcricinfo, 7 December 2023

Henry Lade Murray (31 May 1907 – 25 May 1979) was an English first-class cricketer.

The son of J. M. Murray, he was born in British India in May 1907. He was educated at Haileybury College, before matriculating to Brasenose College, Oxford. After graduating from Oxford, Murray went to India where he was employed by the cotton millers of Mackinnon & Mackenzie. While in India, he played first-class cricket for the Europeans cricket team on six occasions between December 1936 and November 1938, primarily in the Bombay Tournament. Playing as a left-arm medium pace bowler, he took 21 wickets at an average of 21.95; he took one five wicket haul, with figures of 5 for 35 against the Cricket Club of India at the Brabourne Stadium in 1937. Murray served in the British Indian Army during the Second World War, being given an emergency commission as a second lieutenant in June 1940. Following the war and Indian Independence in 1947, Murray remained in India and became president of the Bombay Chamber of Commerce, acting in that capacity in 1958 and 1959. He later returned to England, where he died at Tonbridge in May 1979, shortly before his 72nd birthday.
