= Mal James =

Australian rules footballer

Personal information
- Full name: Malcolm James
- Born: 21 August 1905; Dromana, Victoria
- Died: 26 May 1979 (aged 73); Sandringham, Victoria
- Original team: Brunswick

Playing career^{1}
Years	Club	Games (Goals)
1927	Essendon	1 (0)
- ^{1} Playing statistics correct to the end of 1927.

Malcolm James (21 August 1905 – 26 May 1979) was an Australian rules footballer who played with Essendon in the Victorian Football League (VFL).
