= Judith Wax =

American author (1931–1979)

- Born: c. 1931–1932; United States
- Died: May 25, 1979 (aged 47); Des Plaines, Illinois, U.S.
- Occupation: Author

Judith Wax (c. 1931–1932 – May 25, 1979) was an American author and essayist best known for her book Starting in the Middle, a collection of autobiographical essays about middle age. She died in the American Airlines Flight 191 crash along with her husband Sheldon.

== Life and career ==
Wax was a homemaker until age 42 when she began writing. She first became nationally known for "The Waterbury Tales", a mock poem in Chaucerian style about the Watergate scandal, which she published in both Time and The New Republic. She soon found herself in demand as an essayist for other national publications such as The New York Times and Newsweek.

In 1979, she published her first and only book named Starting in the Middle, a series of light-hearted autobiographical essays about her experiences of middle age. It was described by The New York Times as "a bright, un‐self‐pitying record of [b]ad timing". Kirkus Reviews described the book's essays as "[polishing] the pearls of anxiety lodging in the consciousness of most mid-life, middle-class women".

Her husband Sheldon was managing editor of Playboy magazine. She had two children named Claudia and Paul.

On May 25, 1979, she was to travel from Chicago to Los Angeles for the American Booksellers Association convention with her husband, at which she planned to promote her book. The flight they took was American Airlines Flight 191, which crashed and killed everyone on board.
