= Frank Johnson (footballer, born 1916) =

Australian rules footballer, born 1916

Personal information
- Full name: Frank Johnson
- Born: 6 September 1916
- Died: 12 May 1979 (aged 62)
- Original team: Little River
- Height: 173 cm (5 ft 8 in)
- Weight: 70 kg (154 lb)

Playing career^{1}
Years	Club	Games (Goals)
1936–37	Geelong	8 (1)
- ^{1} Playing statistics correct to the end of 1937.

Frank Johnson (6 September 1916 – 12 May 1979) was an Australian rules footballer who played with Geelong in the Victorian Football League (VFL).
