= Liu Yuzhong =

Chinese politician

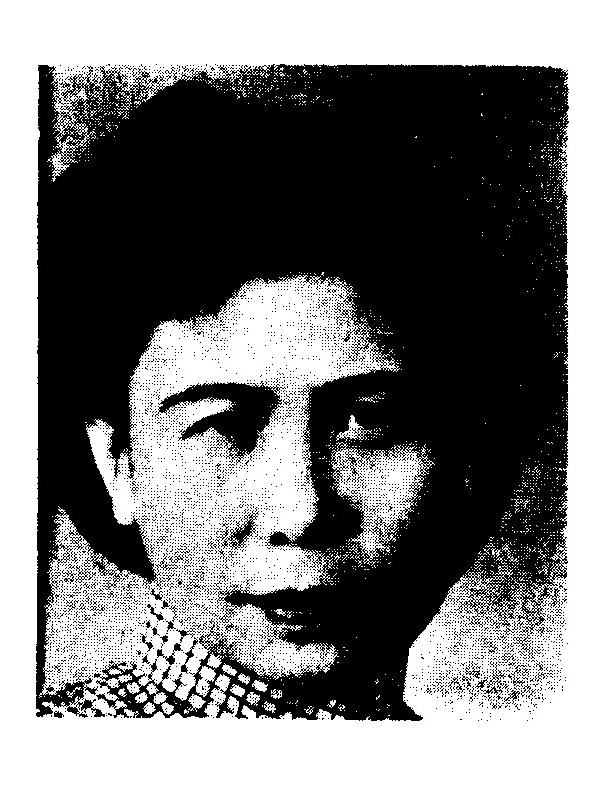

Member of the Legislative Yuan
- In office 1948–1979
- Constituency: Liaoning

Personal details
- Born: 1911
- Died: 31 May 1979 (aged 67–68)

Liu Yuzhong (Chinese: 劉郁中, 1911 – 31 May 1979) was a Chinese politician. She was among the first group of women elected to the Legislative Yuan in 1948.

== Biography ==
Originally from Xinmin in Liaoning Province, Liu attended Peking National University. She joined the Kuomintang and became chair of its women's committee in Liaobei Province.

In the 1948 elections to the Legislative Yuan, she ran as a Kuomintang candidate in Liaoning and was elected to parliament. She relocated to Taiwan during the Chinese Civil War, where she remained a member of the Legislative Yuan until her death in 1979.
