= Stedman Shumway Hanks =

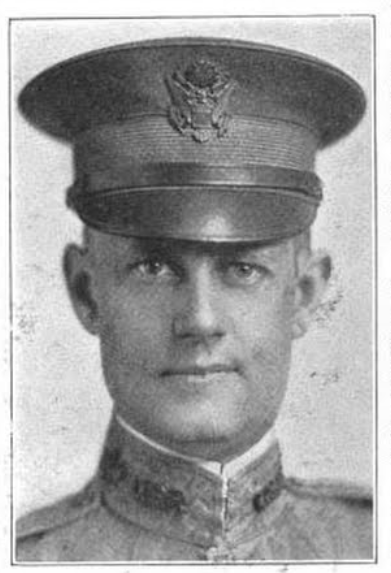
- Stedman Shumway Hanks, ca. 1917
- Born: July 17, 1889; Manchester-by-the-Sea, Massachusetts
- Died: May 23, 1979 (aged 89); Manhattan, New York City
- Resting place: Rosedale Cemetery, Manchester-by-the-Sea, Massachusetts
- Education: Harvard University
- Occupations: President, American Airports Corporation; Executive Director, Massachusetts Aeronautics Commission
- Parent(s): Charles Stedman Hanks (1856–1908); Clarina Bartow Shumway (1857–1925)

Stedman Shumway Hanks (July 17, 1889 – May 23, 1979) was one of the early aviators in the United States. After leaving active military service, he became a prolific writer and a prominent airport engineer who advocated airport construction across the United States.

== Biography ==
Hanks was born in Manchester-by-the-Sea, Massachusetts on July 17, 1889, to Charles Stedman and Clarina Bartow (née Shumway) Hanks. He was educated at Groton and Harvard, from which he left early to join the diplomatic service. His first post was serving as a secretary to Whitelaw Reid, United States Ambassador to the United Kingdom. After Reid's death in 1912, Hanks returned to Harvard to finish his studies, graduating with a Bachelor's degree later that year.

After graduation, he returned to work in the office of the State Department, where he worked for William Phillips, with whom he had served with in London. At the outbreak of World War I, he joined the Army Air Service.

In the late 1920s, concerned with the United States' inattention to building international airports, he toured Europe's airports and published his findings in 1929. In 1936, Hanks patented a flight strip, a new concept in auxiliary airfields, and helped gain government appropriation for their construction throughout the country. Through his publications and consulting work, Hanks became a prominent airport consultant during the industry's early days.

== Personal life ==
Hanks married Margery Hancock (1894–1982) on February 11, 1919 and had one son, Roger Stedman Hanks. Margery Hancock was the sister of Lewis Hancock Jr. That marriage ended in divorce. In 1952, he married Helen Chappell.

In 1890, Hank's father had brought Russian Wolf-Hounds to the United States. His seven were the first to come directly to the United States from Russia, originating from the kennels of Grand Duke Peter Nikolaevich. After his father's death, Hanks remained active in Borzoi fanciers' activities and continued to fund maintenance of the kennel.

Hanks died at his home in Manhattan, New York on May 23, 1979.

== Bibliography ==
- International airports (1929)
- Aviation gets down to earth; the growing need for public landing fields (1940)
- Flight strips for civilian use (1944)
- Flight strips - bargain airports (1945)
- Airfields for Puerto Rico (1946)
- Frontiers are not borders; a brief account of a journey to meet and understand the peoples of the world (1955)
- The Borzoi: the Most Noble Greyhound (1960)

== Military history ==
- Commissioned First Lieutenant, Aviation Section, Signal Officer Reserve Corps, 1917
- Commanding Officer, 18th Aero Squadron, 1918
- Relieved from active duty, 1920; continued to serve in the reserves
- Recalled to active duty, 1940
- Liaison Officer, Office of Assistant Secretary of War, 1940
- Staff Officer, HQ Ferrying Command, 1941–1943
- Various staff duties, HQ United States Army Air Forces, 1943–1945
- Retired, August 1949
