= Kampatimar Shankariya =

Indian serial killer

- Shankariya in 1978
- Born: c. 1952; Srikaranpur, Rajasthan, India
- Died: 16 May 1979 (aged 27); Jaipur, Rajasthan, India
- Status: Executed by hanging
- Conviction: Murder
- Penalty: Death

Details
- Victims: 70 confirmed
- Span of crimes: 1977–1978
- Country: India
- State: Rajasthan
- Date apprehended: 1978

Kampatimar Shankariya (1952 – 16 May 1979) was an Indian serial killer.

Shankariya was born in Srikaranpur, Rajasthan, in 1952 and arrested at the age of 26. He murdered at least 70 people. He killed his victims by hitting them with a hammer on the neck below the ears, which gained him the moniker Kanpatimar (lit. 'one who hits under the ear'). He was convicted in early 1979 and was hanged at Jaipur on 16 May 1979. His last words before being hanged were: "I have murdered in vain. Nobody should become like me."

== See also ==
- List of serial killers by country
- List of serial killers by number of victims
