= Berton Crandall =

American architect

Berton W. Crandall
- Born: September 16, 1882; Pompey, New York, United States
- Died: May 8, 1979 (aged 96); San Mateo County, California, United States
- Occupation: Architect

Berton W. Crandall (September 16, 1882 – May 8, 1979) was an American architect and photographer. He was a graduate of Stanford University's class of 1906. Candall remained in Palo Alto, California as a professional photographer until his death in 1979.

Crandall photographed Stanford campus architecture, student activities, and athletic events. Sports documented are of football, track, and baseball, crew, swimming, basketball, gymnastics, and polo. Student activities include: Frosh-Soph Tie-Up, student parades, honor society Skull & Snakes and the Press Club, dances, plays, Plug Ugly events, junior day activities on Lake Lagunita, and commencement processions. Special events documented include: John C. Branner's inauguration as Stanford University President (1913), and the Student Army Training Corps (1916–1917). A collection of 680 of his photographs can be found at Stanford University's online [exhibits.stanford.edu Berton W. Crandall proof album collection].

Crandall's work was also part of the architecture event in the art competition at the 1932 Summer Olympics.
