= Bill Ralston (footballer) =

Australian rules footballer, born 1910

Personal information
- Full name: William Ralston
- Born: 16 September 1910; Wodonga, Victoria
- Died: 7 May 1979 (aged 68); Braybrook, Victoria
- Original team: Coburg
- Height: 178 cm (5 ft 10 in)
- Weight: 79 kg (174 lb)
- Position: Follower

Playing career^{1}
Years	Club	Games (Goals)
1936	Coburg (VFA)	2 (1)
1936	Melbourne	5 (2)
1937–1940	Coburg (VFA)	10 (12)
- ^{1} Playing statistics correct to the end of 1936.

William Ralston (16 September 1910 – 7 May 1979) was an Australian rules footballer who played with Melbourne in the Victorian Football League (VFL).

Ralston later served in the Australian Army during World War II.
