= John Russell Fulton =

American painter

John Russell Fulton (May 26, 1896 – May 15, 1979) was a painter-illustrator, best known for his cover and interior illustrations for many magazines including Blue book, Redbook, Collier's Weekly, Liberty, Argosy (magazine), Harper’s Bazaar, Saturday Evening Post, Pictorial Review, Good Housekeeping, and American Legion, among others, from the late 1920s to the early 1950s.

== Early life ==
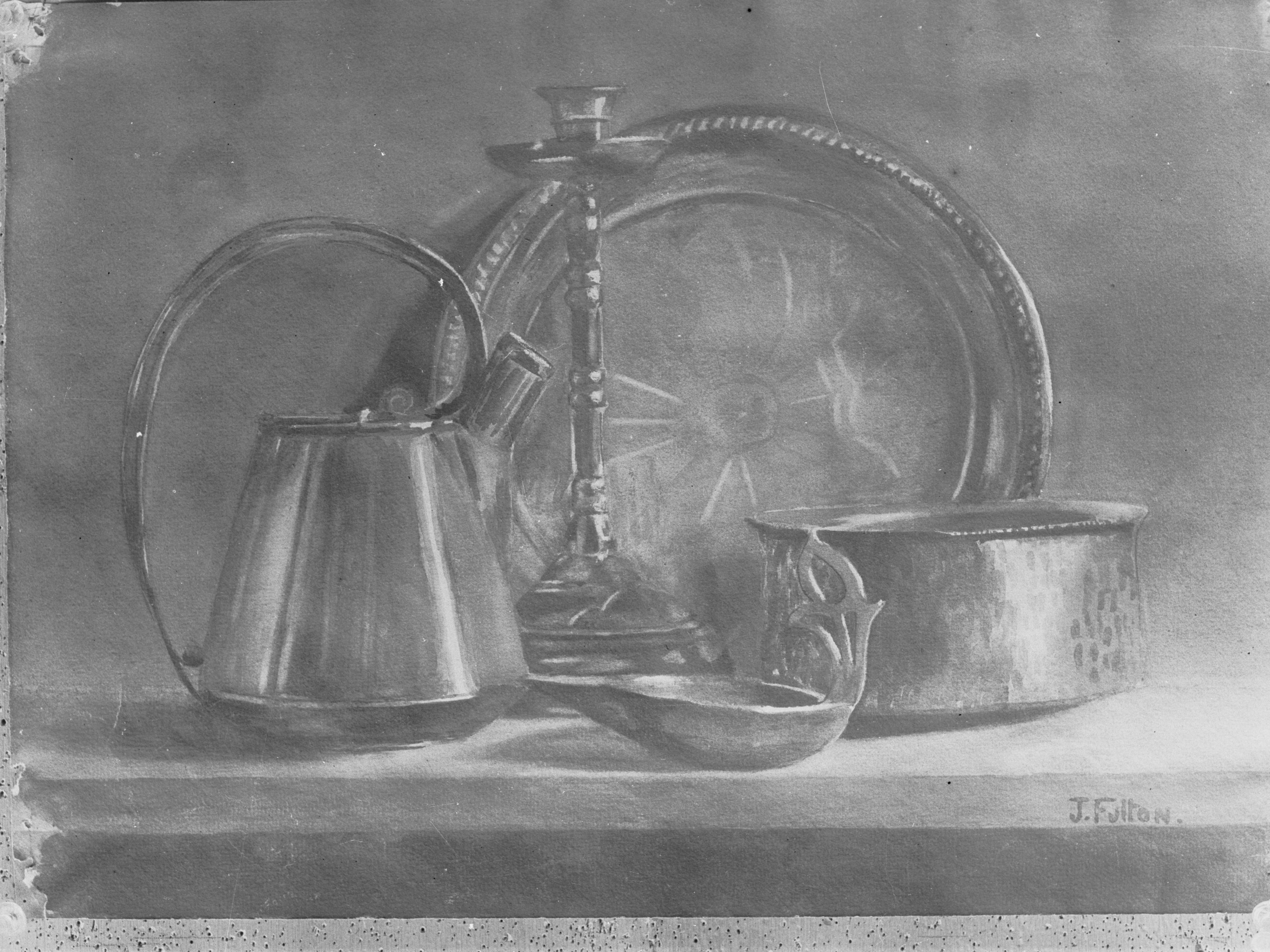
Painting of kettle, candlestick, plate and bowl by John Fulton, ca. 1917

John Russell Fulton was born on May 26, 1896, in Valley Center, Kansas. In his teens, he worked as a newspaper artist for Henry Allen’s Wichita Beacon, for the Kansas City Star, and later worked for the Chicago Tribune. He received his art training at the Art Institute of Chicago (1915), Chicago Academy of Fine Arts (1917–1918), American Academy of Art, Chicago (1926–1927). He also took specialized courses and private instruction from Harvey Dunn and Robert Henri (Ashcan School).

== Career in art ==
In the 1920s, he worked as a commercial advertising artist in Chicago, and then eventually veered toward cover and interior illustration work in the magazine field in New York, where he continued successfully as an illustrator until the mid-1950s. He specialized in period and historical subjects, New York scenes, and landscapes, and was well known for his dry brush and pen and ink technique. He was represented for landscape and figure painting by the Forty-Seventh Street Gallery in New York City, and regularly submitted paintings to the National Academy of Design.

== Later years ==
In the mid-1950s Fulton moved out west to his studio in Hemet, California, focusing on oil paintings of western and desert scenes. He later moved to Anaheim, California. He continued painting his entire life. Fulton died of Lung Cancer in California at the age of 82.

== Quotations ==
- “Although I stick very close to the traditional canvases in my own work, it is my good fortune to be able to get a thrill out of any work of art. I have seen inspiring beauty in just about every class of art, non-objective, classic, traditional or primitive.” -John Russell Fulton
