= M. Penn Phillips =

M. Penn Phillips, born Marion Phillips, (13 June 1887 – 24 May 1979) was an American entrepreneur and prominent real estate developer, born in Parsons, Kansas.

He was founder of the M. Penn Phillips Company which, later, as a subsidiary of Holly Development Corporation, operated in the Western states from the 1920s through the 1970s. His development projects built several new communities, including Hesperia and Salton City in California, and Christmas Valley in Oregon.

In 1923, Phillips opened the new subdivision of Clear Lake Highlands near Clear Lake, California which, in 1980, became part of newly incorporated Clearlake.

In 1955, he was president of Hesperia Land Development and Hesperia Sales Corporation, while conceiving the U-Finish Home, mass-produced housing units that were completely finished on the outside leaving the buyer to complete the interior. In 1959 he served as a member of the committee to form the Mojave Water Agency (MWA), a regional water management agency that secured a contract with the State of California for an allocation of imported water supply from the State Water Project. The MWA serves a 4,900 square mile area in the High Desert of San Bernardino County, including the Hesperia area.

In 1956, he was an alternate delegate from Sierra Madre, California to the Republican National Convention.

Salton City, Phillips' largest community, was mapped out on the west shore of the Salton Sea in 1958. The ambitious resort development was laid out with 25,000 residential lots. Builders paved more than 250 miles of roads, and installed all necessary supporting electrical power, water, and sewage infrastructure. Urban planning by Albert Frey included designs for the entire business district, as well as schools, churches, parks, community services, a championship 18-hole golf course, a $500,000 luxury hotel, yacht club, and the largest marina in California along the lake. The "Salton Riviera" resort began as a major success, with $4.25 million in land sales closed on its opening weekend. Soon thereafter, it was attracting politicians, Hollywood and entertainment celebrities, and sporting events. Salton Sea had already established itself as the second most popular recreation spot in California in the early 1950s, and the resort guaranteed continued success through the 1960s. However, lot purchases were mostly made for investment and few homes were built. The community ended mostly in collapse by the end of the 1970s.

Phillips died in Sierra Madre, California at his Estate where his wife Olive B.Phillips died in 1965. He and his wife were major benefactors to Claremont McKenna College, which named Phillips Hall in his honor in 1966.
