= John Hall (cricketer, born 1903) =

English cricketer

John Bernard Hall (17 June 1903 – 27 May 1979) was an English first-class cricketer. He was a right-handed batsman and medium-paced bowler.

== Early life ==
John Hall was born in Worksop, Nottinghamshire on 17 June 1903 and was educated at Bloxham. He married Mary and had a son Michael who was also a cricketer. He moved with his family to Retford in 1949, where he died on 27 May 1979.

== Cricketing career ==
Hall was a right-handed batsman and medium-paced bowler who made his First-Class debut for Nottinghamshire against Glamorgan in 1935. He then played with Sir Julien Cahn's XI, including a match against Lancashire (1935) and another against Ceylon (March 1937). Hall took 166 wickets, at an average of 20.77, for Sir Julien's team.

He played for Nottinghamshire again in August 1939 against Worcestershire which was the last First Class match played before the outbreak of World War II. After the war he played three more games for Nottinghamshire, with his final match being against Middlesex in June 1946. In his First-Class cricket career he scored 114 runs at 9.50, with a top score of 24; and took 21 First-Class wickets at 24.57.

Between 1947 and 1948 he played for Notts Seconds in the Minor Counties Championship.
