= Daniel Lehu =

French swimmer

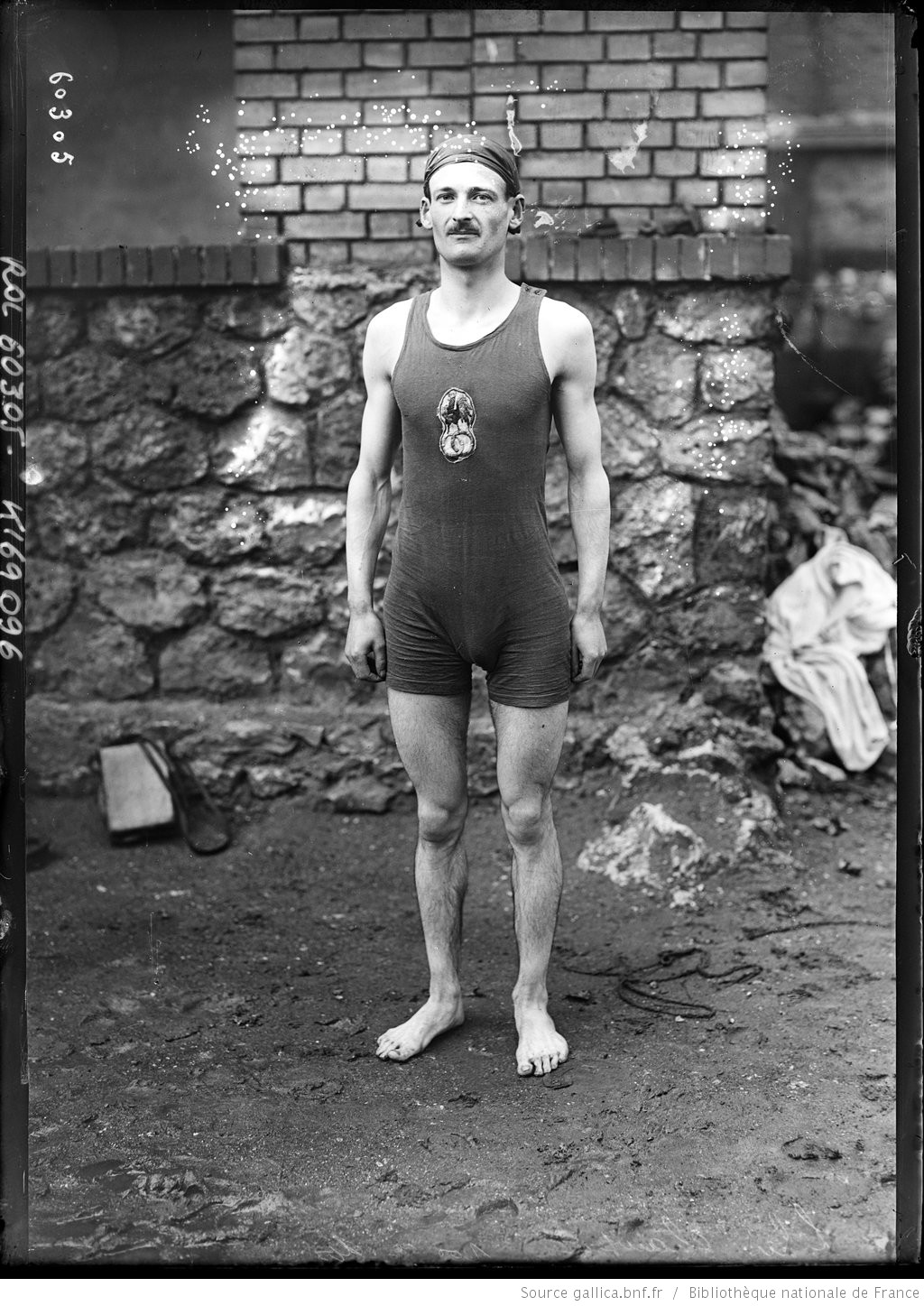
- Daniel Lehu in 1920

Personal information
- Born: 15 February 1896 Tourcoing, France
- Died: 20 May 1979 (aged 83) Tourcoing, France

Sport
- Sport: Swimming
- Club: EN Tourcoing

Daniel Pierre Lehu (15 February 1896 – 20 May 1979) was a French backstroke swimmer. He competed in the 100 m event at the 1920 Summer Olympics, but failed to reach the final.
