= Muriel Stanley =

Indigenous Australian Anglican home missionary, obstetric nurse and social worker

- Born: Muriel Conomie Stanley; 6 April 1918; Yarrabah, Queensland, Australia
- Died: 18 May 1979 (aged 61); Gordonvale, Queensland, Australia
- Other names: Muriel Underwood
- Occupations: midwife, nurse, hospital matron
- Years active: 1937–1970s
- Known for: Anglican mission work; social work

Muriel Conomie Stanley (6 April 1918 – 18 May 1979), also known as Sister Stanley, was an Indigenous Australian Anglican home missionary, obstetric nurse and social worker. Before earning her nursing degree, she served as the matron of a Church Army children's home in Tasmania. She became an obstetric nurse in 1945, making her one of the first Aboriginal Australians to become a registered midwife. She then served as matron of the Yarrabah mission hospital. She held this role from 1945 to until 1959. Leaving the mission, she moved to London for a training course in moral welfare. She returned to Australia and became a social worker for the Anglican Church in Australia, working in Aboriginal Australian communities in Queensland.

== Early life and education ==
Muriel Conomie Stanley was born on 6 April 1918, in Yarrabah, Queensland, which is located on the traditional lands of the Gunggandji people. Her parents were Luke and Jessie Ross (née Kepple) Stanley. Yarrabah was a mission settlement run by the Anglican Church of Australia, and was the largest of the missions in Queensland by 1903. Many of the Aboriginal families living there had been forcibly removed from their traditional lands by the state government.

Stanley attended the mission's school, which had been designated an industrial school (reform schools for "neglected children") in 1900.

== Career ==
Stanley was working as an assistant teacher at the Yarrabah mission school by 1937. Stanley's position at the school would have provided her better opportunities compared to other girls growing up on the mission; at the time, most girls at Yarrabah and other mission settlements went into domestic service for work.

In 1938, Stanley left the mission to study at the Church Army's training college in Newcastle, New South Wales. After completing her training, she began a career working in Church Army children's homes. After working in these institutions in the Hunter region, and then Armidale, in New South Wales, she moved to the Church Army's children's home in Hobart, Tasmania, where she eventually became matron of the home.

Stanley decided to pursue a nursing degree, and become a midwife. She was accepted into the South Sydney Women's Hospital nursing program, where she completed an 18-month course. Since 1912, midwives in Queensland had to pass general nursing qualifying exams before being licensed to practice midwifery. Stanley had passed all the required nursing exams by November 1944, and became a registered obstetric nurse in March 1945. In the Dictionary of Australian Biography, she is described as being "the first Aborigine to qualify in midwifery." Upon completing her training, she returned to Yarrabah where she took up the post of hospital matron. She worked in this role until 1959.

In 1959, Stanley moved to London, England, to attend a two-year Anglican training program on moral welfare. When Stanley returned to Australia, she became a social welfare officer for the Anglican Church in Queensland. From 1961 to 1967, Stanley worked with Aboriginal Australian families in Cairns; in 1967, she was transferred to the Woorabinda mission. In 1970, she was transferred again, this time to Brisbane. She left Brisbane to return to north Queensland, where she remained until her death.

== Life at Yarrabah Mission ==
During Stanley's lifetime, many Aboriginal Australians living at Yarrabah experienced hardships, and their lives were subject both to governmental control and the rules set down by mission authorities. Restrictions were placed on indigenous Australians by the Aboriginals Protection and Restriction of the Sale of Opium Act of 1897, and later the Aboriginals Preservation and Protection Act of 1939. Under these laws, Aboriginal Australians had to obtain permits to work, leave the reservation, or marry. Any wages they earned were not paid directly to them, but to a "protector" who placed their wages in an account and managed the funds. When Stanley returned to Yarrabah in 1945, to work as the hospital matron, she successfully petitioned for an exemption from the law, so that her wages would be paid directly to her.

In the 1950s, when Stanley was working at the mission hospital, Yarrabah was chronically under-funded, rations were inadequate, and housing stock was in poor condition. There were accusations of mismanagement leveled against the superintendent, and frequent turnover in staffing. In 1957, a strike was organized to protest these conditions. Some changes were made to improve the situation, but according to a Cairns newspaper report in 1959, conditions in the mission were still "appalling." In 1960, the Anglican mission at Yarrabah closed, and the government of Queensland took control of the Yarrabah hospital and other facilities.

== Personal life ==
Stanley married Norman Gresham Underwood in St. Alban's Church in Yarrabah on 19 December 1970.

== Death ==
Stanley died on 18 May 1979, in Gordonvale, Queensland. She is buried in the Gordonvale cemetery.

== See also ==
- Nursing in Australia
- Midwifery
