= Thomas White (Sussex cricketer) =

English cricketer

Personal information
- Full name: Thomas Reginald White
- Born: 3 July 1892; Basingstoke, Hampshire, England
- Died: 7 May 1979 (aged 86); Camden, London, England
- Batting: Right-handed
- Bowling: Right-arm fast-medium

Domestic team information
- Years: Team
- 1928: Sussex

Career statistics
Competition	First-class
Matches	1
Runs scored	13
Batting average	6.50
100s/50s	–/–
Top score	9
Balls bowled	30
Wickets	–
Bowling average	–
5 wickets in innings	–
10 wickets in match	–
Best bowling	–
Catches/stumpings	–/–
- Source: Cricinfo, 26 November 2011

Thomas Reginald White (3 July 1892 – 7 May 1979) was an English cricketer. White was a right-handed batsman who bowled right-arm fast-medium. He was born at Basingstoke, Hampshire.

White made a single first-class appearance for Sussex against Cambridge University in 1928. In this match, he scored 9 runs in Sussex's first-innings, before being dismissed by Denis Blundell, while in their second-innings he was dismissed him for 4 by Maurice Allom. Cambridge University won the match by 71 runs.

He died at Camden, London on 7 May 1979.
