= Dick Maynard =

Australian rules footballer

Personal information
- Full name: Richard Burton Maynard
- Born: 20 August 1897; Prahran, Victoria
- Died: 1 May 1979 (aged 81); Surfers Paradise, Queensland

Playing career^{1}
Years	Club	Games (Goals)
1921	Essendon	7 (0)
- ^{1} Playing statistics correct to the end of 1921.

Richard Burton Maynard (20 August 1897 – 1 May 1979) was an Australian rules footballer who played with Essendon in the Victorian Football League (VFL).
