= Uihlein family =

American family active in business and politics

Uihlein
- Current region: Wisconsin
- Origin: Wisconsin; Midwestern United States; Germany
- Estate: Herman Uihlein House (Whitefish Bay, Wisconsin)

The Uihlein family (ee-line) is an American family known for its activities in business and conservative political movements. Of German heritage, the family has roots in Wisconsin. Many members of the family are prominent political donors and activists.

Historically, the family had close ties to the brewing industry, with patriarch August Uihlein's uncle being the founder of what later became the Joseph Schlitz Brewing Company.

== Activities ==
=== Brewing industry ===
August Uihlein emigrated to the United States 1848 to work at the Krug Brewery in Milwaukee, Wisconsin. Founded by his uncle August Georg Krug, the brewery later became the Joseph Schlitz Brewing Company, when after Krug's death, his widow Anna Maria married fellow German-American Joseph Schlitz. In 1875, Schlitz died in the sinking of the SS Schiller. Per Schlitz's wishes, management was passed to the four Uihlein brothers, August, Henry, Alfred, and Edward. When Anna Maria Schlitz died in 1887, the Uihleins acquired full ownership of the firm and the Uihlein family continued to run the brewery for the next century. The Uihleins kept the name Schlitz due to his 1875 testament.

August Uihlein served as chairman of the board from the 1870s until his death. Several of August's children also remained close to the industry; his eldest daughter Ida married Frederick Pabst, Jr., son of brewer Frederick Pabst, in 1862. Ida's grandson Augie Pabst would take on leadership roles at the Pabst Brewing Company after an auto racing career. August's son Joseph carried on his work at Schlitz, eventually becoming vice president of the brewery.

Many descendants of August Uihlein remained active with the company and the brewing industry at large. Robert Uihlein Jr., grandson of August Uihlein, served as an executive at the Joseph Schlitz Brewing Company, becoming president in 1961 and chairman in 1967. Robert also served on the board of directors of the United States Brewers' Association.

=== Shipping and office supplies ===
In 1980 Richard and Elizabeth Uihlein founded Uline, a company selling shipping and business supplies, with money they received from Richard's father, Edgar Uihlein. Richard and Elizabeth have become billionaires as a result of the success of Uline. All three of their children are company executives; Duke Uihlein is the Minnesota branch manager, Freddy Goldenberg is the corporate planning manager, and Brian Uihlein is the vice president of merchandising.

=== Arts and design ===
Steven Uihlein married Italian interior designer Alessandra Branca. Alessandra and her son Andrew Uihlein operate an interior design firm and furniture company. Their daughter, Anna Lucia Uihlein, is an antique dealer.

=== Politics ===
Richard and Elizabeth Uihlein have been influential donors to the Republican party for years, much like Richard's father, who was involved in the John Birch Society and donated to segregationist George Wallace's presidential bid.

David Vogel Uihlein, Jr., is active in conservative causes. He has been a vice chairman of the Lynde and Harry Bradley Foundation since 2001. The organization, commonly known as the Bradley Foundation, has been increasingly active in far-right causes, and "has become an extraordinary force in persuading mainstream Republicans to support radical challenges to election rules", including Donald Trump's efforts to overturn the 2020 election results. The foundation traces its origins to Lynde and Harry Bradley, founders of the Allen-Bradley Company, the latter of whom is David Uihlein, Jr.'s maternal grandfather.

Not all of the Uihleins are active in conservative politics; Lynde Bradley Uihlein, sister of David Uihlein, Jr., supports liberal causes and is a donor to Democratic politicians. Likewise, Richard's niece, Anna Lucia, is not a supporter of Donald Trump.

=== Polo ===
Robert Uihlein Jr. won the U.S. Open Polo Championship in 1951 and 1961

==== Football ====
Mac Uihlein and Logan Uihlein have both played football for Northwestern University.

==== Hockey ====
Mallory Uihlein played hockey for Pennsylvania State University

==== Platform Tennis ====
Brian Uihlein and his sister Freddy Goldenberg are important figures in platform tennis. Freddy joined the American Platform Tennis Association board in 2013. Brian is a member of the platform tennis hall of fame.

== Family tree ==
- Josef Benedikt Uihlein (1813–1874) m. Katharine Krug (1820–1867)
  - August Uihlein (1842–1911) m. Emily Werdehoff (1851–1910)
    - Clara Uihlein (1873–1873)
    - Anna Uihlein (1873–1873)
    - Ida Charlotte Uihlein (1874–1968) m. Frederick Pabst Jr.(1869–1958)
      - Pauline Pabst (1897–1980)
      - Frederick August Pabst (1899–1977)
      - Rudolf Pabst (1900–1978)
      - August Uihlein Pabst (1902–1934)
      - Robert Erwin Pabst (1905–1980)
      - Harald "Shorty" Pabst (1915–2005)
    - Joseph E. Uihlein (1875–1968) m. Ilma Vogel (1885–1983)
      - David Vogel Uihlein Sr. (1920–2010) m. Jane Bradley Pettit (1918–2001)
        - David Vogel Uihlein Jr. m. Julia Pickard Aring.
        - Lynde Bradley Uihlein (born 1945)
    - Paula Uihlein (1877–1968)
    - Thekla Uihlein (1879–1946) m. William Charles Frederick Brumder (1868–1929)
      - William George Brumder (1901–1976)
      - Emily Thekla “Shirley” Brumder Hansen (1903–1971)
      - Frederick August Brumder (1906–1907)
      - Thekla Pauline Henriette Brumder (1908–1991)
      - Katherine Brumder Holbrook (1911–1975)
      - Robert C. Brumder (1918–2014)
    - Robert Uihlein Sr. (1883–1959) m. Mary Stevens Ilsley (1884–1975)
      - Robert Uihlein Jr. (1916–1976) m. Lorraine Glaeser (1924–2007)
        - Robert A. "Robin" Uihlein III
          - Augie Uihlein (1987–2012)
          - Kiley Uihlein (born 1989)
        - James Uihlein
          - James P. Uihlein
      - Mary Uihlein Trainer (1918–1971)
    - Erwin Charles Uihlein (1886–1968) m. Marie Zarwell (1917–2006)
      - Erwin C Uihlein Jr. (1946–1968)
  - Henry Uihlein (1844–1922) m. Helene Kreutzer (1849–1921)
    - August E. Uihlein (1871–1939)
      - Henry Uihlein II (1896–1997)
      - Frederick E. Uihlein (1897–1950)
      - Sarah Adele M. Uihlein (1899–1996)
    - Emma Uihlein (1873–1939)
    - Adele Uihlein (1875–1892)
    - Laura Uihlein (1877–1967)
    - George E. Uihlein (1880–1950)
    - Meta Uihlein (1884–1966)
    - Herman A. Uihlein (1886–1942) m. Claudia Holt (1886–1992)
      - Helen Uihlein Peters (1912–2002)
      - Herman Alfred Uihlein Jr. (1917–2008)
      - Claudia Uihlein Caesar (1919–1952)
      - Virginia “Ginny” Uihlein Martin (1920–2016)
      - John Holt Uihlein (1921–1986)
      - Henry Holt Uihlein (1921–2011)
  - Edward Uihlein (1845–1921) m. Augusta Manns (1852–1913)
    - Clara Uihlein (1876–1956)
    - Edgar John Uihlein Sr. (1877–1956) m. Paula Huck
      - Edgar John Uihlein Jr. (1916–2005) m. Lucia Ellis (1918–2012)
        - Steven Uihlein, m. Alessandra Branca
          - Andrew Uihlein
          - Anna Lucia Uihlein
        - Sally Rauch
        - Lucia Uihlein - Higgins
        - Richard Uihlein (born 1945) m. Elizabeth Anne Hallberg
          - Fredericka 'Freddy' Goldenberg
          - Duke Uihlein
            - Mallory Uihlein
            - Lauren Uihlein
            - Grant Uihlein
          - Brian Uihlein
            - Macintosh 'Mac' Uihlein
            - Logan Uihlein
    - Olga Uihlein (1879–1971) m. Henry Beneke (1867–1948)
      - Kathryn Uihlein Beneke (1904–1906)
      - Claire Uihlein Beneke Goldberg (1905–1945)
      - Olga Uihlein Beneke Taylor Devitt (1905–1990)
      - Edward Uihlein Beneke Sr. (1907–1968)
      - Henry Uihlein Beneke Jr. (1911–1992)
    - Richard Uihlein (1880–1884)
    - Ella Uihlein (1886–1960) m. Edwin Alexander Seipp Sr. (1883–1946)
      - Pauline Seipp Goltra Armstrong (1914–1987)
        - Peter Seipp Goltra (1940-2024) m. Catherine Bakeeff Petersen
          - Edward Seipp Goltra
          - Alexis Obolensky Goltra
        - Oliver Renard Goltra (1943–2024) m. Alice Bodley Cotsworth (1943-)
          - Andrew Renard Goltra (1978-)
          - Carolyn Seipp Goltra (1980-)
      - Edwin Alexander Seipp Jr. (1918–2014)
    - Melita Uihlein (1892–1919) m. William Conrad Seipp Jr. (1889–1962)
      - Melita Seipp Howland (1919–1998)
  - Charles Uihlein (1847–1915) m. Emma Manns (1858–1946)
    - Anna Uihlein (1879–1900)
    - Arthur Charles Uihlein (1879–1933)
    - Oscar Lewis Uihlein (1882–1942)
  - Alfred E. Uihlein (1852–1935) m. Anna Pilger (1854–1933)
    - Walter Uihlein (1876–1896)
    - Mathilda Uihlein (1878–1944)
    - William Benedict Uihlein (1880–1953)
    - Herbert E Uihlein (1890–1947)
  - Gustav Uihlein (1854–1870)
  - Laura Uihlein (1857–1943) m. Charles Werdehoff (1849–1885)
    - Anna Werdehoff (1880–1948)
  - William J. Uihlein (1859–1932) m. Eliza Rahte (1865–1965)
    - Hertha Uihlein (1889–1890)
    - Martha Uihlein (1889–1890)
    - Ralph Alfred Uihlein (1897–1982)
