= Uihlein =

Uihlein is a surname.
Notable people bearing it include:

- August Uihlein (1842–1911), German-born American businessman
- Joseph E. Uihlein (1875–1968), American businessman
- Robert Uihlein, Jr. (1916–1976), American businessman
- David Vogel Uihlein, Sr. (1920–2010), American heir and businessman
- Lynde Bradley Uihlein (born 1945), American heiress and liberal philanthropist
- Richard and Elizabeth Uihlein (born 1945), American businesspeople
- Wally Uihlein (born 1950), American golf businessman
- David Vogel Uihlein, Jr. (fl. 1974 & fl. 2020), American heir, businessman and conservative philanthropist/activist
- Peter Uihlein (born 1989), American golfer

== See also ==
- Uihlein Soccer Park
- Herman Uihlein House
