= Fiserv Forum =

Indoor arena in Milwaukee, Wisconsin, US

- Four-One-Forum

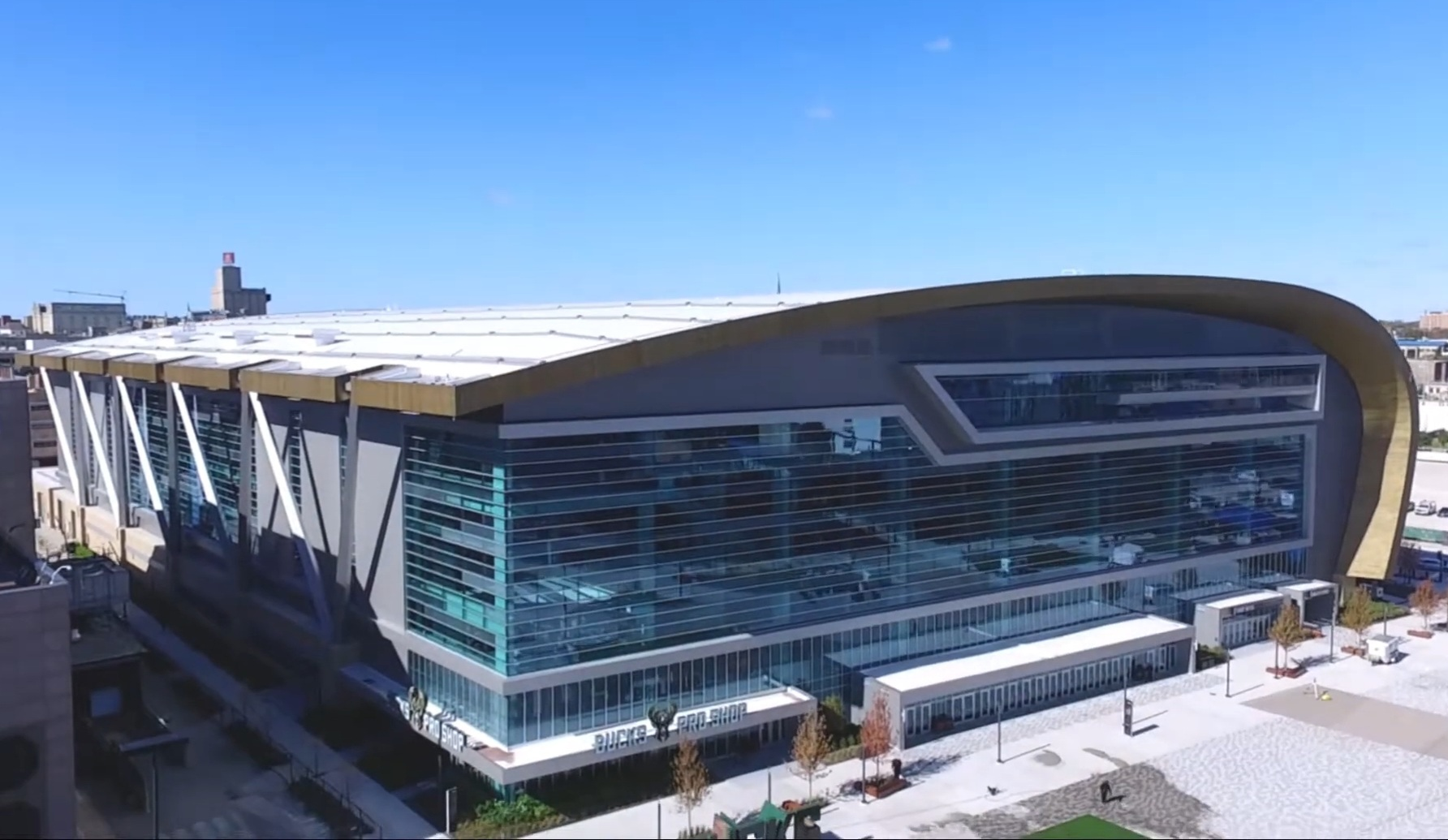
- Fiserv Forum in 2023

- Location in Wisconsin Location in the United States
- Full name: Fiserv Forum Complex Center
- Former names: Wisconsin Entertainment and Sports Center (during construction)
- Address: 1111 Vel R. Phillips Avenue
- Location: Milwaukee, Wisconsin, U.S.
- Coordinates: 43°2′42.1″N 87°55′5.4″W
- Owner: Wisconsin Center District
- Operator: Milwaukee Bucks
- Capacity: Basketball: 17,385; Ice hockey: 15,178; Concerts: 18,000
- Executive suites: 34
- Type: Arena
- Record attendance: 18,412 (February 28, 2020)
- Field size: 714,000 sq ft (66,300 m^{2})
- Public transit: MCTS; High Frequency: GreenLine, 15, 18, 19, 80; Local Service: 31, 33, 34, 57, 81; The Hop; Future "M-Line" extension

Construction
- Groundbreaking: June 18, 2016
- Opened: August 26, 2018
- Cost: US$1.2 billion ($1.54 billion in 2025 dollars)
- Architects: Populous; HNTB; Eppstein Uhen Architects
- Project manager: ICON Venue Group
- Structural engineers: HNTB; ZS, LLC
- Services engineers: M–E Engineers, Inc.
- General contractor: Mortenson Construction

Tenants
- Milwaukee Bucks (NBA) (2018–present); Marquette Golden Eagles (NCAA) (2018–present)

Website
- fiservforum.com

Fiserv Forum (/faɪˈsɜːrv ˈfɔːrəm/; stylized as fiserv.forum) is a multi-purpose arena located in downtown Milwaukee, Wisconsin. It is the home of the Milwaukee Bucks of the National Basketball Association (NBA) and the Marquette Golden Eagles men's basketball team of Marquette University.

Construction began in 2016, with the arena officially opening its doors in 2018. Taxpayers contributed $250 million towards the total construction cost of $524 million. The city of Milwaukee sold the land in downtown Milwaukee for $1 to the team.

The Fiserv Forum is the third-newest arena in the NBA, after Intuit Dome in Los Angeles (opened in 2024) and Chase Center in San Francisco (opened in 2019).

== History ==
Despite being one of the premier NBA facilities when completed in 1988, the BMO Harris Bradley Center was one of the oldest active NBA arenas by the end of the Bucks' tenancy in 2018. Only Madison Square Garden in New York City and Oakland Arena in Oakland were older than the Bradley Center; however, both Madison Square Garden and Oakland Arena were substantially renovated during their lifetimes, with Oakland Arena eventually being replaced by the new Chase Center in San Francisco, beginning with the 2019–20 season. The funds for the building of the BMO Harris Bradley Center were donated by Jane Bradley Pettit and husband Lloyd Pettit without any provision for the building's long-term capital needs or annual operating expenses. Although the facility was self-sufficient, its tenants, such as the Bucks, were at a disadvantage compared with other NBA teams because of the arrangement.

Former Bucks owner and former U.S. Senator Herb Kohl proposed building a new downtown arena to replace the Bradley Center. There was considerable discussion in the region about the idea of a publicly funded arena and ultimately no resolution was reached. In 2009, Wisconsin Governor Jim Doyle included a provision in the state's capital budget seeking $5 million in state bonding support to renovate the Bradley Center. The Bradley Center's board of directors told state officials that the building needed $40 million in renovations, so they reportedly agreed to raise the remaining $35 million on their own.

On September 18, 2013, then-deputy NBA commissioner Adam Silver toured the arena and said it was a few thousand square feet short of NBA standards, and also lacked numerous amenities. On April 16, 2014, Kohl announced an agreement to sell the franchise to New York City hedge-fund investors Marc Lasry and Wesley Edens. The deal included provisions for $100 million each from Kohl and the new ownership group, for a total of $200 million, toward the construction of a new downtown arena. The NBA then informed the Bucks that the franchise wouldn't be allowed to renew their lease on the Bradley Center, which would expire after the 2017–18 season, and that the team needed to have either a new arena completed or under construction by the beginning of 2018, or the franchise would be bought from Lasry and Edens, then sold to another ownership group, either in Las Vegas or Seattle, which would mean the certain departure of the Bucks from Milwaukee. On July 15, 2015, the Wisconsin Senate approved funding for the new arena by a 21–10 margin, and on July 28, 2015, the Wisconsin State Assembly approved funding by a 52–34 margin. On August 12, 2015, Governor Scott Walker signed the arena spending plan at Wisconsin State Fair Park in West Allis, Wisconsin.

The Milwaukee city council voted 12–3 on September 22, 2015, to approve the plan. The city's Plan Commission gave unanimous conditional approval to the Bucks' general development plans for land in the Park East Corridor on November 23, while acknowledging possible parking problems in the area.

On April 13, 2016, the Bucks signed a 30-year lease to play in the new arena. In addition, Marquette University has agreed to lease the arena for its home games, beginning in 2018. Unlike Marquette's previous agreement with the Bradley Center, the lease agreement with Fiserv Forum ends in the spring of 2025, allowing Marquette the option to decide to pursue the building of its own smaller arena for lesser-attended match-ups, and to only utilize the Fiserv Forum for larger Big East Conference and Badgers-Golden Eagles rivalry games.

The official groundbreaking was during the 2nd annual Bucks Block Party on June 18, 2016.

On May 2, 2017, Bucks president Peter Feigin stated that construction of the arena remained on schedule and on budget. Feigin's announcement was from the site of the new arena, after the first roof truss was installed and bolted into place. The roof was officially topped off on August 24, 2017. On August 26, 2018, Fiserv Forum was officially opened in a ribbon-cutting ceremony at the 4th annual Bucks Block Party. The first live event at Fiserv Forum was The Killers with Violent Femmes on September 4, 2018.

The Bucks played their inaugural game at the Fiserv Forum during the preseason against the Chicago Bulls on October 3, 2018, a 116–82 Bucks victory. The Forum's regular-season home opener was played on October 19, 2018, against the Indiana Pacers. The Bucks won, 118–101. The Bucks' first season in the Forum was a great success, with the Bucks finishing the regular season with their first 60-win season since 1980–81. They also went 33–8 at the Forum, the second-best home record in the NBA. On April 14, 2019, the Forum hosted its first NBA playoff game, Game 1 of the first round between the Bucks and the Detroit Pistons. The Bucks won, 121–86.

On December 22, 2019, the Bucks had their 50th consecutive sellout at the Forum, the longest such streak in franchise history, which started on November 16, 2018.

On March 11, 2019, it was announced that the Fiserv Forum would host the 2020 Democratic National Convention from July 13 to 16, 2020. It was later postponed to August 17–20, 2020, due to the ongoing coronavirus pandemic in the United States. On June 24, 2020, it was announced that the convention would be downsized and instead held at the nearby Wisconsin Center.

On February 22, 2020, the Bucks set a new attendance record for the Forum, when 18,290 attended to watch the Bucks play the Philadelphia 76ers. The Bucks won 119–98. This record was broken less than a week later, on February 28, 2020, as 18,412 fans watched the Bucks face off against the Oklahoma City Thunder. The Bucks won 133–86.

On July 11, 2021, Fiserv Forum hosted its first NBA Finals game, Game 3 between the Bucks and the Phoenix Suns. The Bucks won 120–100. On July 20, the Fiserv Forum also hosted Game 6 of the NBA Finals, where the Bucks would clinch their first NBA championship in 50 years, beating the Suns 105–98.

The Bucks have had substantial success at Fiserv Forum since it opened, compiling a regular season record of 161–45 (.782 winning percentage) at the Forum.

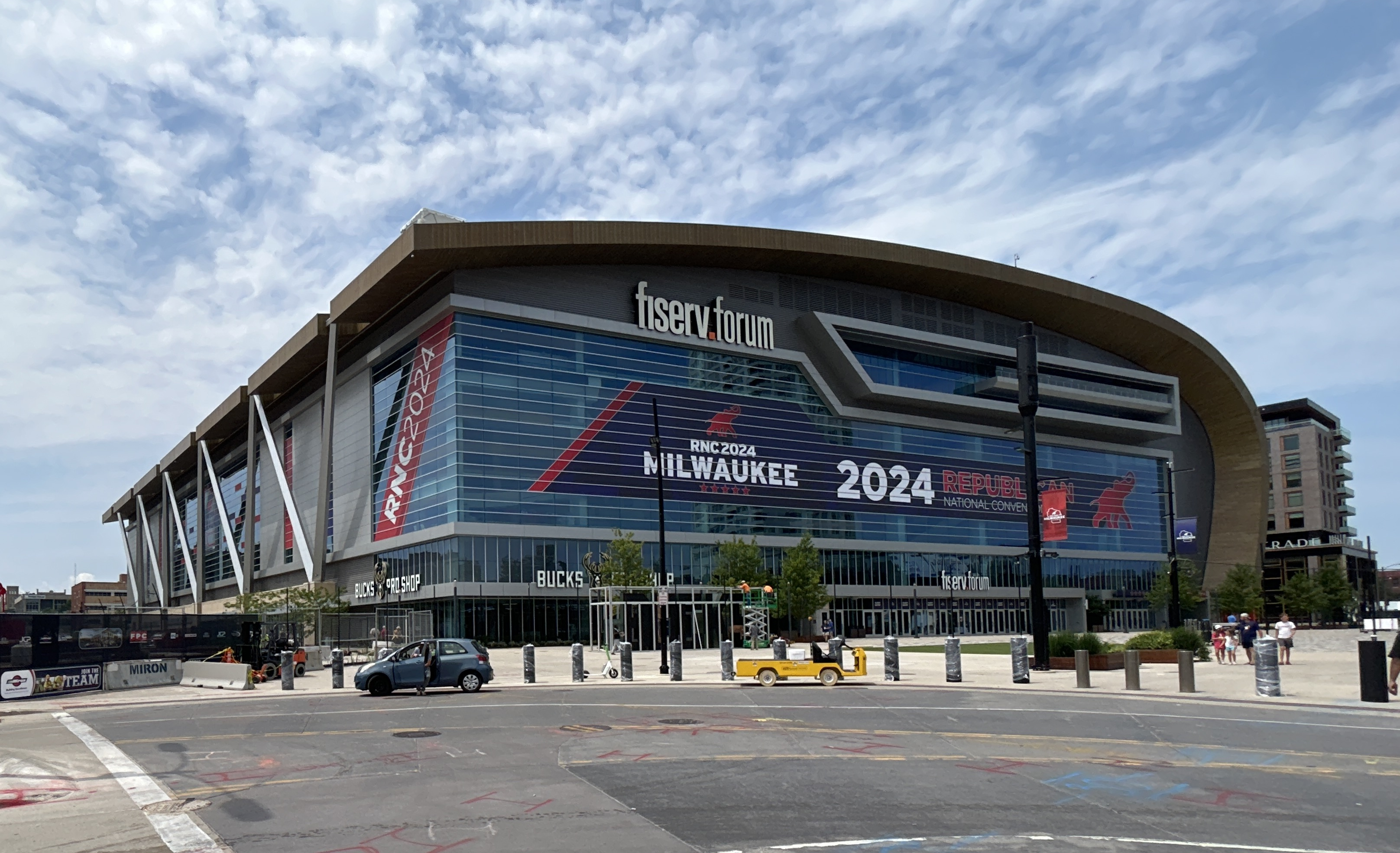
Exterior of Fiserv Forum decorated for the 2024 Republican National Convention

On July 15–18, 2024, the Forum hosted the 2024 Republican National Convention. On August 20, 2024, the Forum hosted a campaign rally with the Democratic Party's nominees, Kamala Harris and Tim Walz, that coincided with the 2024 Democratic National Convention in Chicago's United Center, located approximately 80 miles (130 km) away.

=== Naming rights ===
On July 26, 2018, the Bucks agreed to a 25-year naming rights deal with Fiserv, a financial services technology company based in the Milwaukee suburb of Brookfield.

=== Concerts and events ===
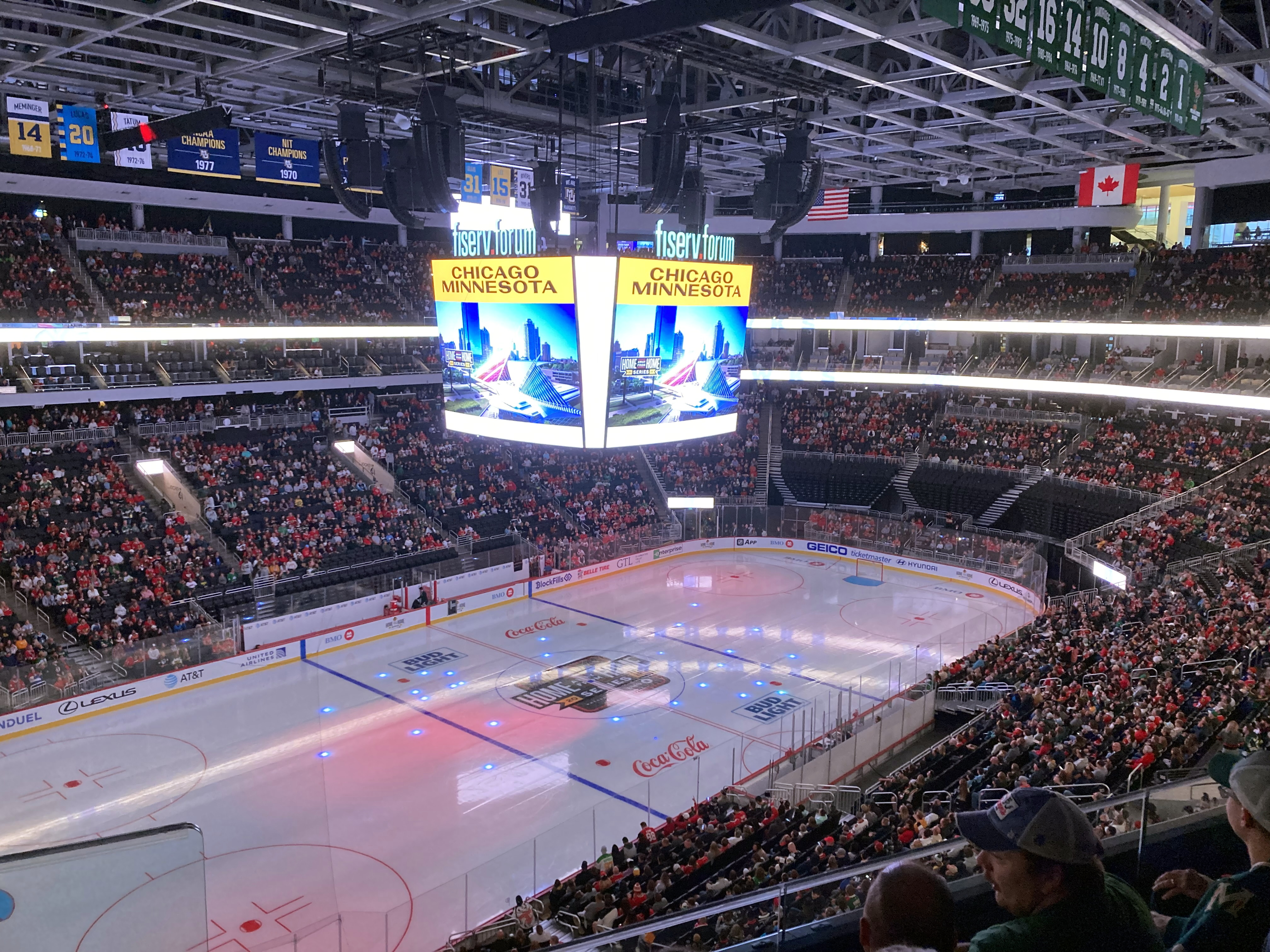
Minnesota Wild vs. Chicago Blackhawks NHL preseason game at Fiserv Forum

The Killers with Violent Femmes were the first concert at Fiserv Forum on September 4, 2018.

On December 28, 2021, Fiserv Forum held its first ice hockey games with the inaugural Holiday Face–Off tournament.

On October 2, 2022, Fiserv Forum held its first National Hockey League pre-season game. The Chicago Blackhawks played the Minnesota Wild as part of the Blackhawks "Home Away from Home" series.

The arena also continues a Milwaukee tradition for being the site of the New Year's Eve game for the Harlem Globetrotters, with 2020 being the only pause in decades.

== Planning and design ==
The Milwaukee Bucks released the first images and details of their vision for the development of a new multi-purpose arena and sports and entertainment district to revitalize downtown Milwaukee on April 8, 2015. The images depicted early conceptual drawings of a new multi-purpose venue and entertainment district that will anchor a new development vision activated by sports, entertainment, residential and office uses. The site, which primarily sits between 4th Street and 6th Street from State Street to McKinley Avenue, will seamlessly link with active development on all sides, including Old World Third Street, Schlitz Park, The Brewery, the Milwaukee riverfront, Water Street and the Wisconsin Center.

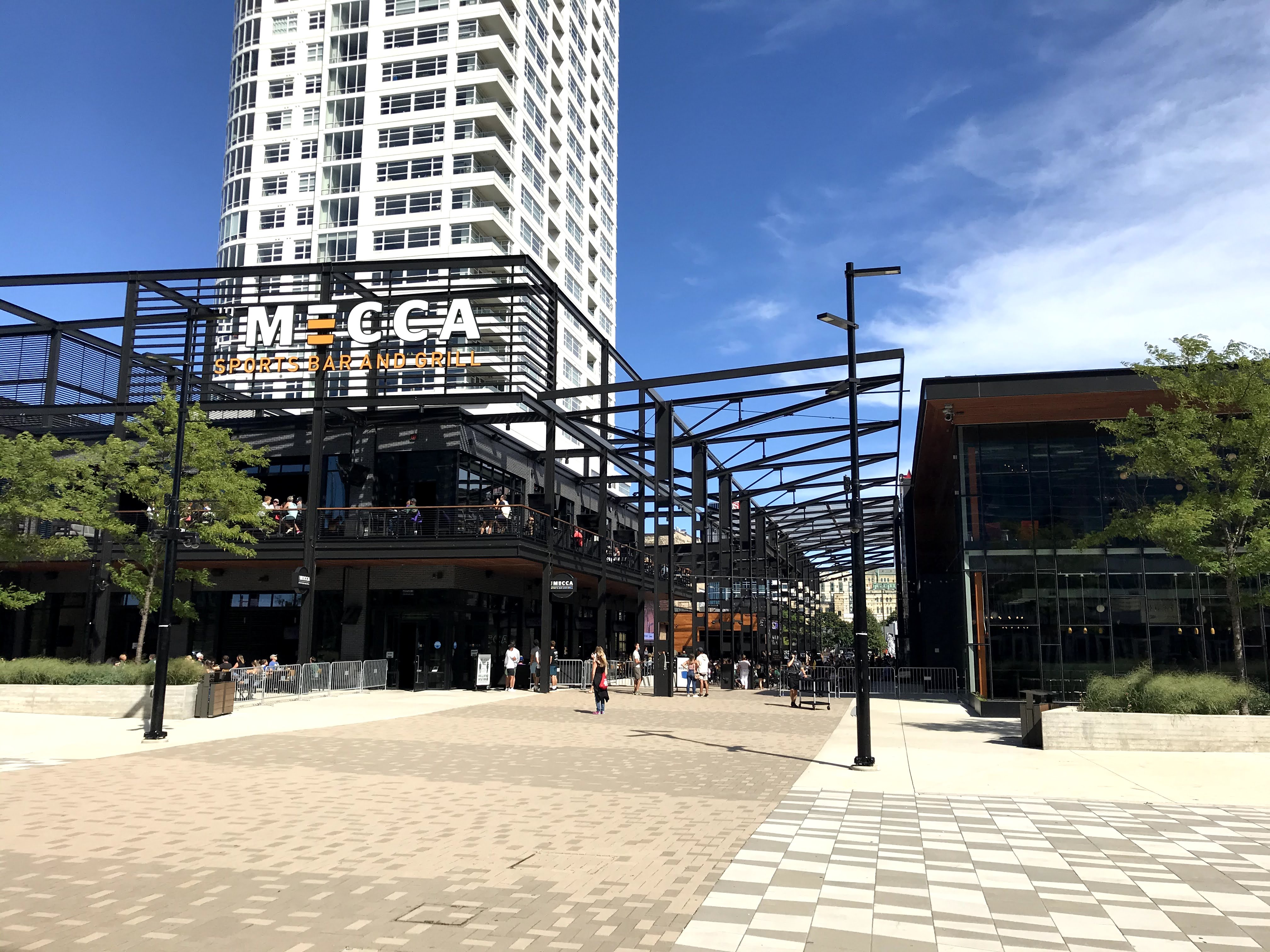
The plaza outside of the Forum serving as the public space in the center of the Deer District

Populous and HNTB, two firms from Kansas City, lead the arena design team with participation from Milwaukee firm Eppstein Uhen Architects. The arena is intended to be the focal point of a "live block" zone that includes public space surrounded by both commercial and residential development. Initial renderings of the arena showed a transparent facade and a curved roof and side meant to evoke the water forms of nearby Lake Michigan and the Milwaukee River. "Herb Kohl Way" was unveiled on the plaza outside of Fiserv Forum on August 26, 2018, to pay tribute to the former Bucks owner for his contributions leading up to the building of the arena. The plaza is home to restaurants and a beer garden, where people can gather year-round to watch sporting events on a large, outdoor television. In May 2019, the Bucks announced Fiserv Forum is the central building in the 30-acre development district around the arena newly named "Deer District". In February 2019, Johnson Controls unveiled a three-dimensional statue of their logo placed outside the Fiserv Forum, which can glow in multiple colors at night, and will specifically turn green after every Bucks victory.

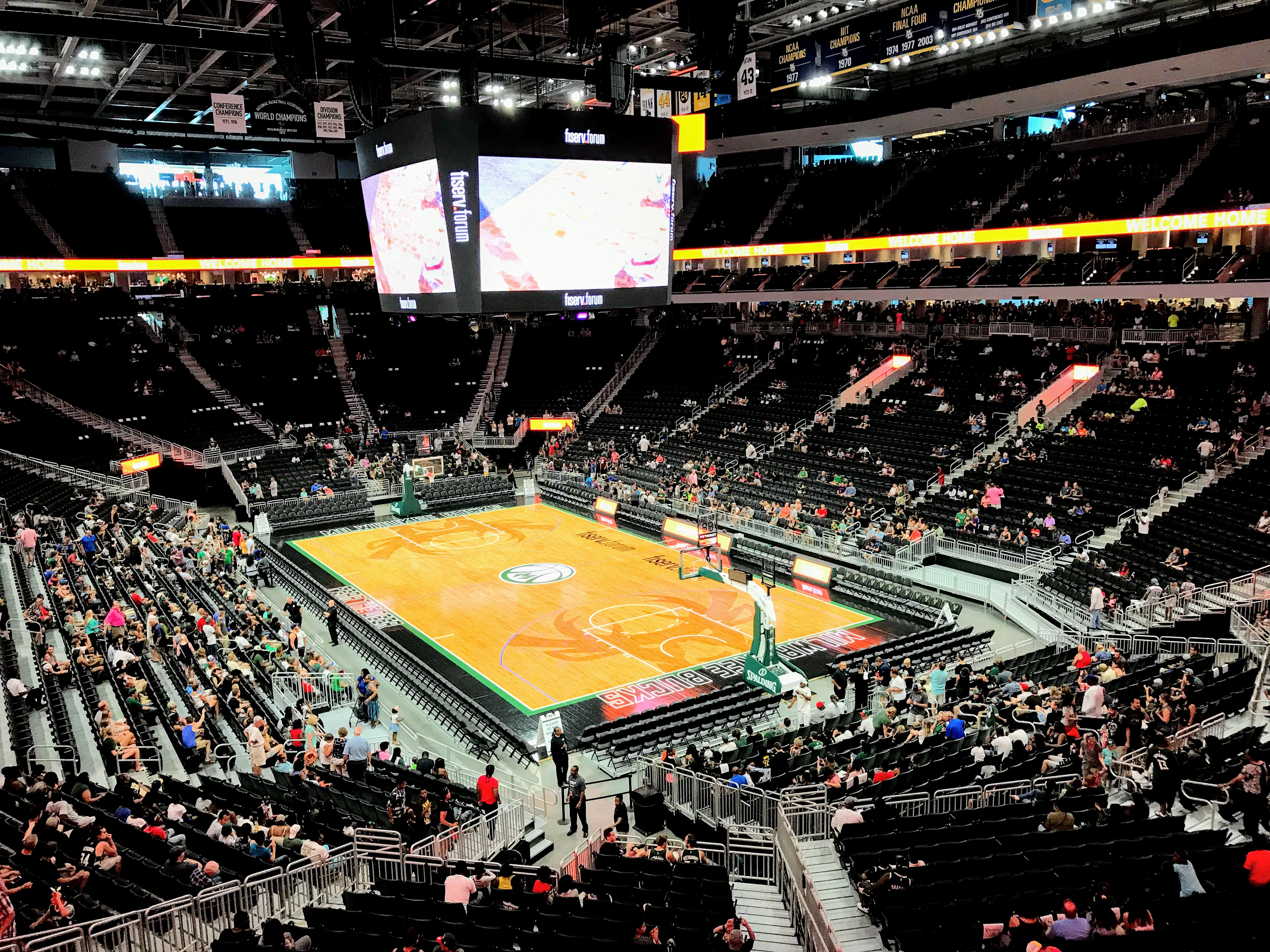
Inside Fiserv Forum

Fiserv Forum holds 17,500 people and has fewer luxury suites, but more club seating than the BMO Harris Bradley Center. The arena seats 17,385 for basketball games, 15,178 for ice hockey and indoor football, and up to 18,000 for concerts.

It also features a layout and equipment for an NHL/NCAA-regulation ice hockey rink and ice shows such as Disney on Ice, thus it still will be able to host the NCAA Frozen Four as the BMO Harris Bradley Center did in the past in 1993, 1997 and 2006. However, the American Hockey League's Milwaukee Admirals returned to the UW–Milwaukee Panther Arena in the 2016–17 season as they were not approached to play games in the arena. The Bucks are contractually bound not to recruit current tenants of the Panther Arena to move their events to the Fiserv Forum.

At its opening, Fiserv Forum had the largest center-hung scoreboard in the NBA.

== See also ==
- List of NCAA Division I basketball arenas
