= Wisconsin Athletic Hall of Fame =

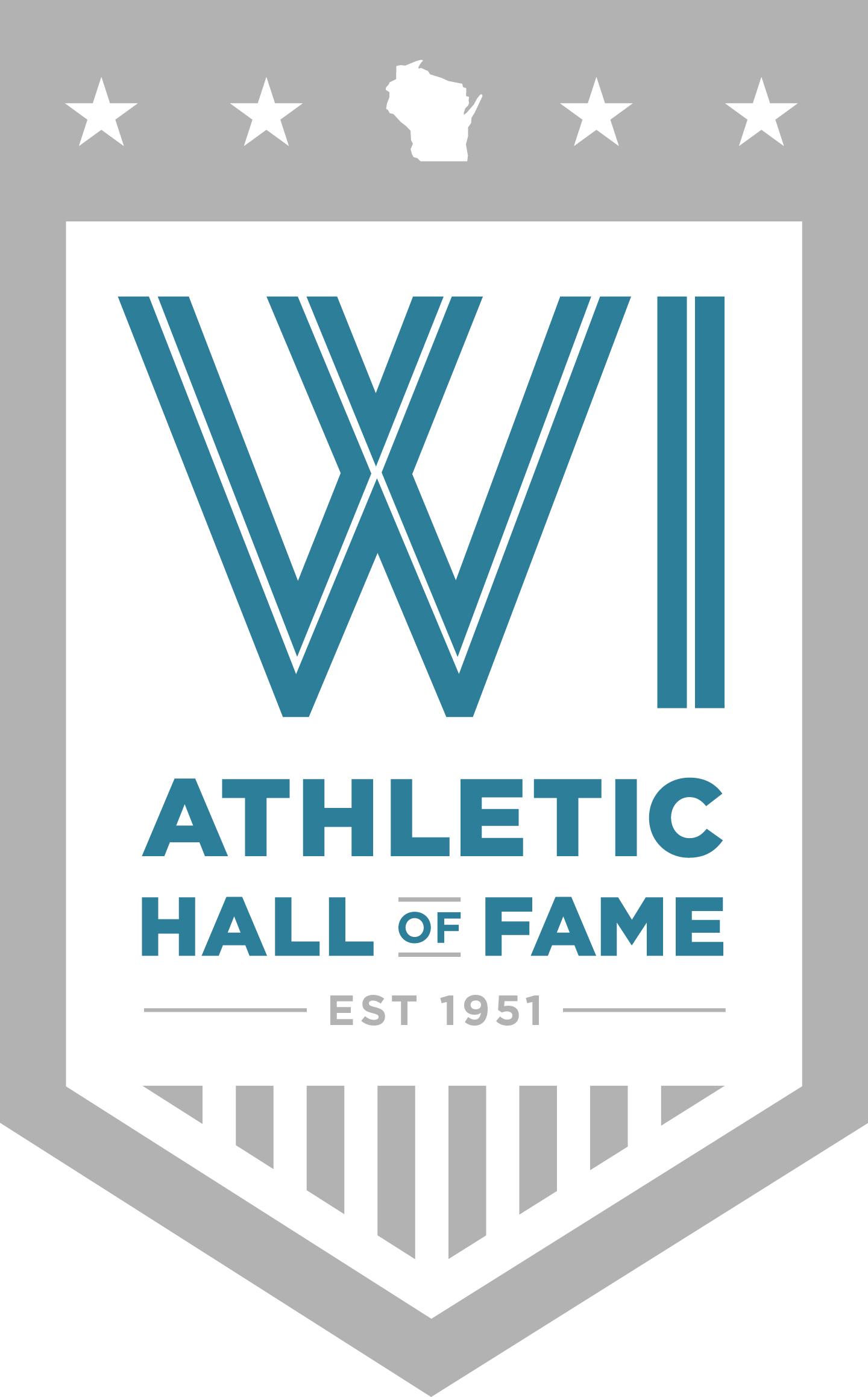
Wisconsin Athletic Hall of Fame Logo

The Wisconsin Athletic Hall of Fame honors distinguished members of Wisconsin's sports history. The Hall of Fame hosts several annual events, including an induction ceremony to honor new members, nomination luncheons, speaker series breakfasts and more. Bronze commemorative plaques honoring the members of the Wisconsin Athletic Hall of Fame, including Hank Aaron, Vince Lombardi, Oscar Robertson, Bart Starr and others, are displayed in the Wisconsin Athletic Walk of Fame promenade in downtown Milwaukee, Wisconsin.

== History ==
The Wisconsin Athletic Hall of Fame was established in 1951 in Milwaukee by sports promoter Joseph Krueger and leaders of the Milwaukee Arena as a way to honor outstanding athletes, coaches, and contributors associated with Wisconsin. The Hall’s founding was approved by a resolution of the Wisconsin State Senate, which mandated bronze plaques be displayed to honor athletic achievement and inspire youth. The inaugural induction ceremony was held on November 28, 1951. The Hall of Fame plaques were originally available only to paying customers at the Milwaukee Arena (now the UW–Milwaukee Panther Arena); however for the 50th anniversary in 2001, the Wisconsin Sports Development Corporation (WSDC) constructed a Wisconsin Athletic Walk of Fame outside of the UW–Milwaukee Panther Arena in Milwaukee so the plaques could be on permanent public display at no cost.

After Krueger’s death in 1987, the Hall faced challenges maintaining consistent induction activity. From 1987 until the early 1993s, scheduled inductions lapsed. The Wisconsin Sports Authority and later the WSDC attempted to revive the Hall through the 1990s and 2000s, holding biennial inductions and expanding programming, but financial and operational constraints continued to limit activities.

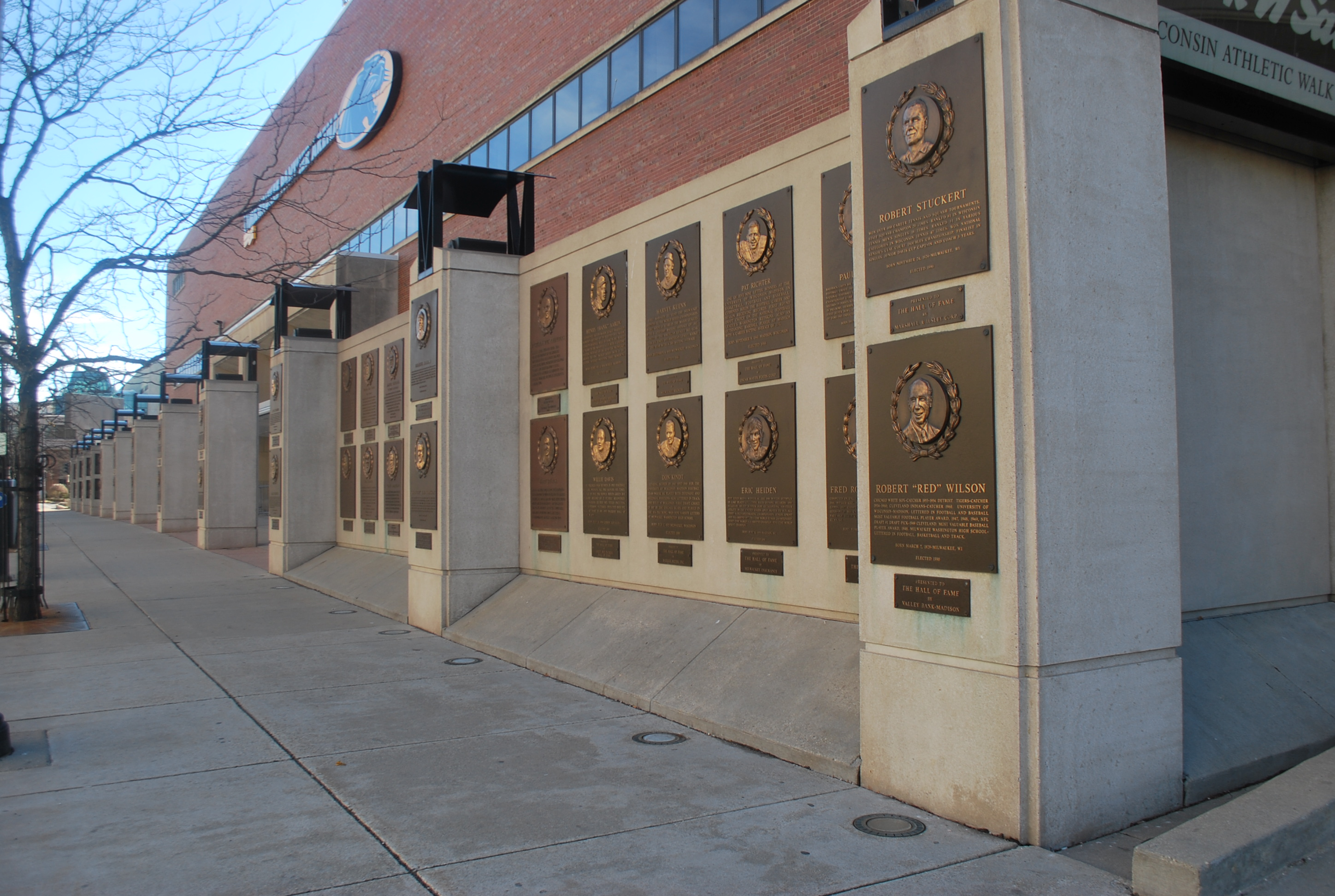
Wisconsin Athletic Walk of Fame Profile

In December 2014, Milwaukee-based Lammi Sports Management (now Team Lammi) announced it had acquired the assets of the Hall from the previous managing organization, with plans to revitalize the institution and restore annual induction ceremonies. Under the new ownership structure, Wisconsin Hall of Fame, LLC assumed responsibility for the Hall’s affairs.

Each year, the Hall holds an official induction ceremony to honor new members whose achievements have made a lasting impact on Wisconsin’s sports history. In 2025, the Hall celebrated its 75th anniversary class with inductees including Green Bay Packers kicker Mason Crosby and NFL Hall of Famer Joe Thomas.

== 67th Anniversary Class ==
On October 27, 2015, the Wisconsin Athletic Hall of Fame announced that Wisconsin Badgers men's basketball coach Bo Ryan and Green Bay Packers all-time leading wide receiver Donald Driver were selected for induction into the Athletic Hall of Fame's 65th Anniversary Class. The pair was inducted during a special event celebrating their careers and contributions to athletics in Wisconsin on April 30, 2016, at the UW–Milwaukee Panther Arena, the site of the first Wisconsin Athletic Hall of Fame induction event in 1951.

== 68th Anniversary Class ==
Wisconsin Badgers Heisman Trophy winner Ron Dayne, LPGA legend Sherri Steinhauer, and Green Bay Packers player Charles Woodson were inducted as part of the 68th Anniversary Class on April 29, 2017. Bud Selig was also honored for his efforts to advance athletics and better the community in the state of Wisconsin with the Lifetime Achievement Award. 2016 inductee and Green Bay Packers Hall of Famer Donald Driver served as the MC for the event, which again took place at the UW–Milwaukee Panther Arena.

== 69th Anniversary Class ==
Wisconsin golf contributor Herbert Kohler Jr., Milwaukee Bucks player Marques Johnson and Green Bay Packers general manager and Pro Football Hall of Famer Ron Wolf were inducted into the 69th Anniversary Class of the Wisconsin Athletic Hall of Fame on January 24, 2019, at Discovery World in downtown Milwaukee.

== 70th Anniversary Class ==
Green Bay Packers players Brett Favre and Jordy Nelson were selected for induction into the 70th Anniversary Class of the Wisconsin Athletic Hall of Fame on June 5, 2020, in Madison. Barry Alvarez will also be honored for his efforts to advance athletics at the University of Wisconsin–Madison, for being the winningest coach in the school's history, and for bettering the community of Wisconsin with the Lifetime Achievement Award.

== Inductees ==
See footnotes

There are 145 people inducted into the Wisconsin Athletic Hall of Fame. Inductees come from a variety of sports, including auto racing, football, basketball, water skiing, bowling, baseball, and bicycling, and various Olympic sports.

A full list of inductees, along with pictures of their corresponding Hall of Fame plaques, can be found on the Wisconsin Athletic Hall of Fame's official website: www.wihalloffame.com.

=== A ===
- Hank Aaron * (1988)
- Ned Allis (1956)
- Barry Alvarez (2009)
- Alan Ameche * (1967)
- John Anderson (2022)

=== B ===
- Tommy Bartlett * (2003)
- Ginger Beaumont * (1951)
- Fred Beell * (1972)
- Dick Bennett (2007)
- Ray Berres * (1999)
- Lisle Blackbourn * (1978)
- Bonnie Blair (1995)
- Johnny Blood * (1960)
- John Boie (2026)
- Ryan Braun (2026)
- Fritz Breidster * (1979)
- Terry Brennan * (1981)
- Junior Bridgeman * (1999)
- Cub Buck * (1955)
- John Day Buckstaff * (1960)
- LeRoy Butler (2022)

=== C ===
- Tony Canadeo * (1973)
- Connie Carpenter (2001)
- Cecil Cooper (2007)
- Mason Crosby (2025)

=== D ===
- Bob Dandridge (2022)
- Willie Davis * (1988)
- Chuck Daw * (1951)
- Ron Dayne (2017)
- LaVern Dilweg * (1967)
- Janis Doleschal (1999)
- Gus Dorais * (1955)
- Donald Driver (2016)
- Red Dunn * (1957)

=== F ===
- Brett Favre (2020)
- Chuck Fenske * (1970)
- Prince Fielder (2024)
- Rollie Fingers (2023)
- Jim Fitzgerald * (1999)
- Harold E. Foster * (1970)

=== G ===
- Bob Gansler (2026)
- Jim Gantner (2005)
- Don Gehrmann * (1981)
- Earl Gillespie * (2001)
- Charles Goldenberg * (1973)
- Ahman Green (2023)
- Burleigh Grimes * (1954)
- Charlie Grimm * (1978)

=== H ===
- Archie Hahn * (1959)
- Pat Harder * (1976)
- Bob Harlan * (2009)
- Joe Hauser * (1967)
- Beth Heiden-Reid (2005)
- Eric Heiden (1990)
- Arnie Herber * (1967)
- Bernard Heselton * (1981)
- Clarke Hinkle * (1951)
- Elroy Hirsch * (1964)
- Diane Holum (1993)
- Paul Hornung * (1990)
- Don Hutson * (1951)

=== J ===
- Dan Jansen (1995)
- Conrad M. Jennings * (1958)
- "Badger Bob" Johnson * (1993)
- Ernie Johnson Jr. (2025)
- Mark Johnson (2003)
- Marques Johnson (2019)
- Davy Jones * (1963)
- Thomas E. Jones Sr. * (1953)
- Addie Joss * (1951)

=== K ===
- Ted Kellner (2023)
- Ken Keltner * (1970)
- Leroy Kemp (2009)
- Matt Kenseth (2024)
- Don Kindt * (1988)
- Herb Kohl * (2007)
- Herbert Kohler * (2019)
- Ed Konetchy * (1961)
- Alvin Kraenzlein * (1952)
- Jerry Kramer (1993)
- Joseph J. Krueger * (1981)
- Harvey Kuenn * (1988)
- Alan Kulwicki * (1993)

=== L ===
- Curly Lambeau * (1961)
- Verne Lewellen * (1967)
- Ed "Strangler" Lewis * (1951)
- Vince Lombardi * (1976)
- Fred Luderus * (1957)

=== M ===
- Carl Marchese * (1978)
- Hank Marino * (1958)
- Shirley Martin * (1998)
- Eddie Mathews * (1976)
- George McBride * (1952)
- Jon McGlocklin (1993)
- Al McGuire * (1995)
- Walter Meanwell * (1954)
- Buddy Melges * (2007)
- Edward Strong Merrill * (1964)
- John Messmer * (1959)
- Ralph Metcalfe * (1951)
- Mike Michalske * (1970)
- Fred Miller * (2007)
- Richie Mitchell * (1951)
- Paul Molitor (1999)
- Sidney Moncrief (1998)
- Arlie Mucks * (1964)
- Mark Murphy (2026)
- Frank Murray * (1959)

=== N ===
- Jordy Nelson (2020)
- Ernie Nevers * (1951)
- Albert Nicholas (CEO) * (2009)
- Kid Nichols * (1951)
- Ray Nitschke * (1981)
- Andy North (1998)

=== O ===
- Pat O'Dea * (1951)
- Jim Otto * (1998)

=== P ===
- Frank Parker * (1960)
- Jane Pettit * (1993)
- Lloyd Pettit * (1993)
- George Poage * (1998)
- John Powless * (2009)

=== R ===
- Hank Raymonds * (2005)
- Vic Reinders * (1981)
- Pat Richter (1988)
- Oscar Robertson (1995)
- Dave Robinson (2022)
- Fred Roethlisberger (1990)
- Harlan B. "Biddy" Rogers * (1961)
- Pants Rowland * (1964)
- Bo Ryan (2016)

=== S ===
- Walter C. Sanger (1961)
- Joey Sangor * (1967)
- Dave Schreiner * (1951)
- Bud Selig (2001)
- Al Simmons * (1951)
- Johnny Sisk * (1970)
- Billy Sixty * (1970)
- Warren Spahn * (1973)
- Bart Starr * (1981)
- Sherri Steinhauer (2017)
- Christian Steinmetz * (1957)
- Steve Stricker (2024)
- Robert Stuckert * (1990)
- Billy Sullivan * (1953)
- Guy Sundt * (1958)
- Judith Sweet (2009)

=== T ===
- Jim Taylor * (2001)
- Gorman Thomas (2003)
- Joe Thomas (2025)
- George Thompson * (2001)
- Fuzzy Thurston * (2003)

=== U ===
- Bob Uecker * (1998)

=== W ===
- John Walsh * (2005)
- Mike Webster * (2007)
- Reggie White * (2005)
- Rollie Williams * (1960)
- Ivy Williamson * (1973)
- Red Wilson * (1990)
- Ron Wolf (2019)
- Charles Woodson (2017)

=== Y ===
- Robin Yount (1995)

=== Z ===
- Robert Zuppke * (1951)

An asterisk (*) indicates a deceased member

== See also ==
- Wisconsin Golf Hall of Fame
- Wisconsin Hockey Hall of Fame
- Green Bay Packers Hall of Fame
- Milwaukee Brewers Walk of Fame
