= Linda Dempsay =

American athletic director

Biographical details
- Born: May 27, 1938 (age 88); Orange, California, U.S.
- Education: University of California, Berkeley

Administrative career (AD unless noted)
- 1965–1977: UC Irvine (assistant AD)
- 1977–1983: UC Irvine

Linda Blower Dempsay (born May 27, 1938) is an American former sports administrator who was the first woman to serve as an athletic director at the NCAA Division I level.

== Early life ==
Dempsay was born on May 27, 1938 in Orange, California to Floyd Arthur and Margaret Finley Blower. Her father was a standout for the California Golden Bears football team and recruited in the Tustin/Santa Ana area for Cal coach Pappy Waldorf. Dempsay played many sports growing up, with her favorites being field hockey and volleyball. She graduated from Tustin High School in 1956. She received her bachelor's degree from the University of California, Berkeley in 1960 and her master's degree from the same institution in 1965.

On December 18, 1960, she married John G. Dempsay. They had three children.

== Career ==
Dempsay began her career as a teacher and chair of the physical education department at Mt. Eden High School in Hayward, California. While studying for her master's degree she was an instructor and junior supervisor at UC Berkeley.

Dempsay joined the faculty of the University of California, Irvine when the school opened in 1965. She oversaw all of women's athletics and coached the women's volleyball, tennis and swim teams. In 1977, she became acting athletic director and chair of the physical education department when Raymond Thornton went on a year's sabbatical. When UC Irvine moved to NCAA Division I on July 31, 1977, Dempsay became the first woman to serve as an athletic director at that level (Judith Sweet was the first woman to serve as an NCAA athletic director, but did so at a Division III school). During their first year in the Pacific Coast Athletic Association, UC Irvine won more league championships (three) than any other PCAA school. Thornton resigned as UCI's athletic director in 1978 and Dempsay was named his replacement. She was credited with hiring UC Irvine Anteaters men's basketball coach Bill Mulligan, who brought Center Kevin Magee with him from Saddleback College. The Anteaters went 40–17 in Magee's two years at the school and appeared in the 1982 and 1986 National Invitation Tournaments.

== Later life ==
Dempsay resigned from UC Irvine in 1983 to work full time for her family's business. She served as general manager of the Pak West Paper & Chemical Company, which she owned with her husband and brother. In 1991, she was inducted into the National Association of Collegiate Directors of Athletics hall of fame. Her granddaughter, Aly Squires, played for the UC Irvine Anteaters women's volleyball team from 2010 to 2013.
