= Lynde Bradley Uihlein =

American heiress and philanthropist

- Born: 1945 (age 80–81); Milwaukee, Wisconsin, U.S.
- Education: University of Wisconsin–Milwaukee
- Occupations: Philanthropist; environmentalist

Lynde Bradley Uihlein (born 1945) is an American heiress and philanthropist.

== Biography ==
=== Early life ===
Lynde Bradley Uihlein was born in Milwaukee, Wisconsin, in 1945. Her mother was Jane Bradley Pettit, a philanthropist. Her maternal grandfather was Harry Lynde Bradley, co-founder of Allen-Bradley and the Bradley Foundation with her granduncle, Lynde Bradley. Her father was David Vogel Uihlein Sr., heir to the Joseph Schlitz Brewing Company. Her paternal great-grandfather was August Uihlein. Her brother is David Vogel Uihlein Jr., Vice Chairman of the Bradley Foundation. She is a cousin of Uline founder Richard Uihlein and niece of General Binding Corporation founder Edgar Uihlein. She received a Bachelor of Arts degree in art history and a master's degree in social welfare, both from the University of Wisconsin–Milwaukee.

=== Philanthropy ===
In 1990, Uihlein founded the Brico Fund, a non-profit grant-making organization initially focused on feminism, which expanded to include environmentalist and progressive projects in general, and focusing on the state of Wisconsin.

Uihlein has supported EMILY's List and NARAL Pro-Choice America, and serves on the Boards of the League of Conservation Voters (both the non-profit and associated political 527 Action Fund), and the Milwaukee Art Museum. An environmentalist, she also supports Midwest Environmental Advocates, Milwaukee Riverkeeper, Fondy Food Market, Growing Power, Walnut Way, Midwest Organic and Sustainable Education Service, and Wisconsin Wetlands Association. She operates a community-supported agriculture project, the "Afterglow Farm", north of Milwaukee, including The Kitchen Table Project. She has donated more than US$2.6 million to her alma mater, the University of Wisconsin-Milwaukee.

She is a Democrat, and has supported Al Gore, John Kerry, and Barack Obama.

=== Personal life ===
Uihlein inherited a 300-acre (120 ha) parcel of land from her grandparents, Joseph and Ilma Uihlein, in Port Washington, Wisconsin. In January 2009, she bought 25 acres (10 ha) of land from the former Squires Country Club.
