= Emerson D. Hoyt =

American politician

- Born: March 7, 1847; Wauwatosa, Wisconsin
- Died: 1924 (aged 76–77)
- Occupations: Politician, Real Estate Developer

Emerson D. Hoyt was the first president of the Village of Wauwatosa, Wisconsin and then the town's first mayor.

== Biography ==
Hoyt was born on March 7, 1847, in Wauwatosa, Wisconsin. He had no formal education. He would become involved in real estate. He was a member of the Wisconsin State Assembly in 1887, 1893, 1895, and 1896.

Hoyt served as the president of the Village of Wauwatosa in 1893, 1894, and 1895. He was later elected as the town's first mayor, serving from 1897 through 1904. He also served on the Milwaukee County Parks Commission from 1907 through 1921. Additionally, he was President of the first National Bank of Wauwatosa from 1907 through 1921.

Hoyt died in 1924.

== Legacy ==
In 1914 Emerson D. Hoyt donated the lot on 1626 Wauwatosa Avenue for the Wauwatosa Woman's Club Clubhouse with the provision that the structure also be used as a museum to preserve the early history of Wauwatosa. The building was listed on the National Register of Historic Places in 1998 and is still being used.

Hoyt Park and Hoyt Pool are named after Emerson D. Hoyt.
