= Schuster's =

Department store company

Schuster's, officially Ed. Schuster & Co., was a department store chain, founded in 1883, in Milwaukee, Wisconsin, and it is now defunct.

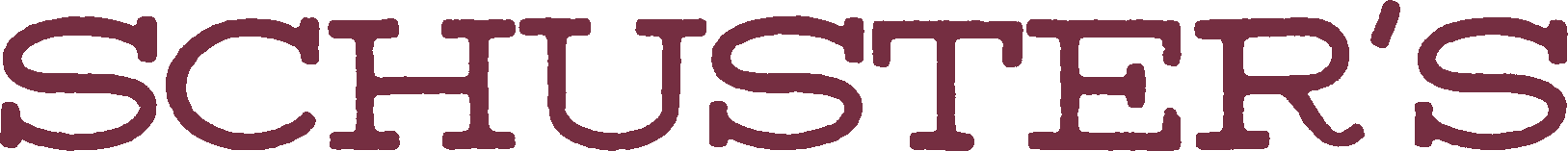
Schuster's logo

== Department store in Milwaukee ==
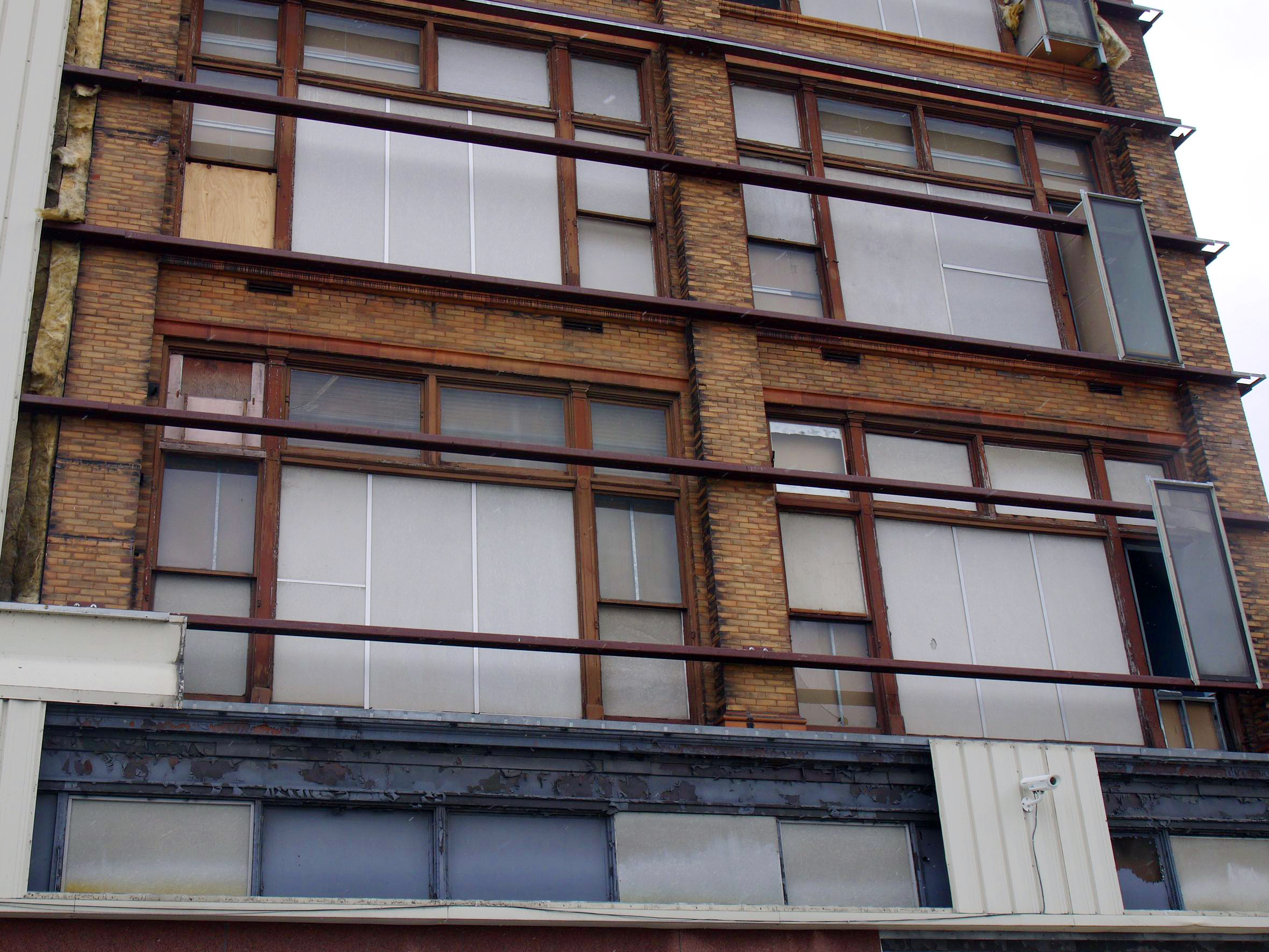
Exterior of Schuster's Department Store on King Drive in Milwaukee when it was temporarily unclad in 2015

Schuster's opted for several neighborhood stores over a single downtown location, and Schuster's locations included 2151 N. Third St. (now Martin Luther King Jr. Drive), 12th and Vliet streets and 11th and Mitchell streets, Packard Plaza and Capitol Court. Kirchhoff & Rose. designed the Third Street store. Gimbels bought Schuster's in 1962 and operated as Gimbels-Schuster's until 1969. Golda Meir worked at Schuster's after graduating from high school in 1915 and before moving to Palestine in 1921.

Schuster's notable marketing efforts included the first trading stamps, in 1891, an early version of the charge card called Budga-Plate, a doll named Billie the Brownie from 1927 to 1955, Schuster's Christmas Parade, and the catch-phrase "Let's go by Schuster's where the streetcar bends the corner round."

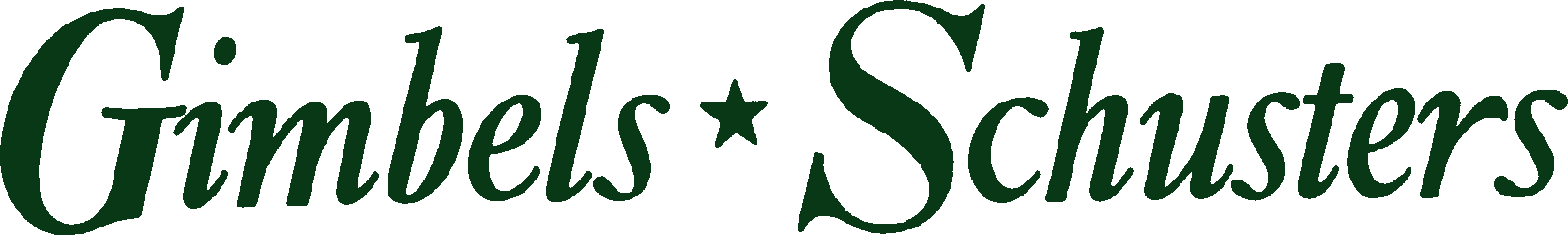
Gimbels-Schuster's transition logo

== Others ==
An unrelated group of furniture stores in Arkansas, also carrying the Schuster's name, operated for many years, with locations in Little Rock and North Little Rock, as well as a Pine Bluff store that eventually transferred briefly to Conway.

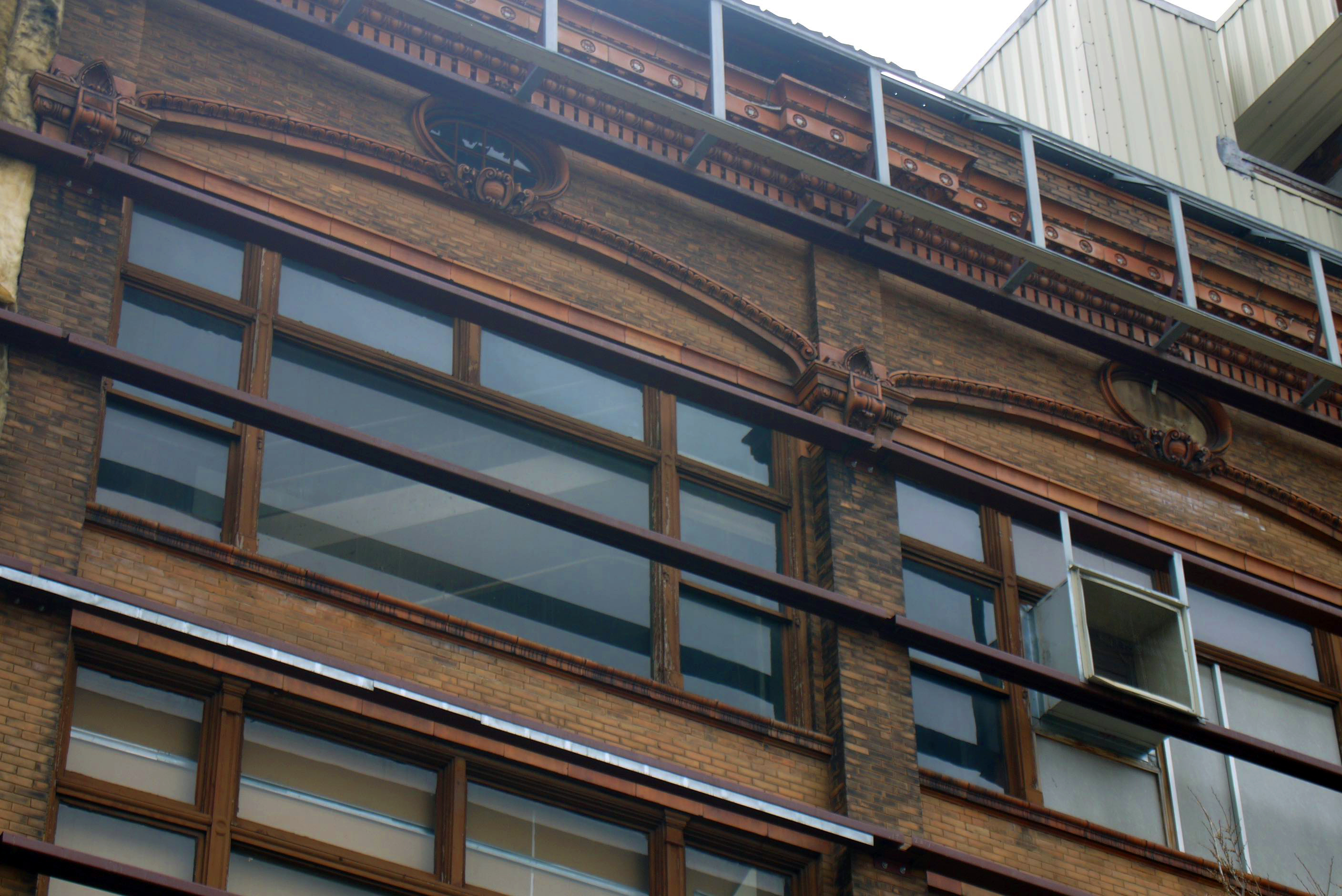
Exterior of Schuster's Department Store, showing decorative brickwork

There was also a restaurant called Schuster's House of Fine Foods located in Greenville, PA, between circa 1930 and circa 1945.
