= Kirchhoff & Rose =

Kirchhoff & Rose was an architectural firm in Milwaukee, Wisconsin. The partnership began in 1894 between Charles Kirchhoff Jr. and Thomas Leslie Rose.

Several of their works are listed on the National Register of Historic Places.

== Works ==
Selected works include (with individual or joint attribution):

- Palace Theatre (New York City)
- Herman Uihlein House, 5270 N. Lake Dr., Whitefish Bay, WI (Kirchhoff & Rose), NRHP-listed
- Joseph E. Uihlein mansion on Lake Shore Drive
- Majestic Office Building and Theatre
- Schlitz Palm Garden and Hotel
- Joseph Schlitz Brewing Company Saloon, 2414 S. St. Clair St. Milwaukee, WI (Kirchhoff, Charles), NRHP-listed
- Tivoli Palm Garden, 500 W. National Ave. Milwaukee, WI, 1901, (Kirchhoff, Charles), part of Walker's Point Historic District.
- Pawling & Harnischfeger’s Plant
- Second Ward Savings Bank, now the Milwaukee County Historical Society, 910 N. 3rd St. Milwaukee, WI (Kirchhoff, Charles), NRHP-listed
- Schuster's Department Store at 2151 N. King Dr.
- Harley-Davidson Motor Company Factory No. 7 at 228 South 1st St., 1912, (Kirchhoff & Rose), NRHP-listed.
- Blue Mound Golf and Country Club Clubhouse at 10122 West North Avenue, Wauwatosa, WI.
- Bishop's manse (Nicholson House), All Saints Cathedral, Milwaukee, (Kirchhoff & Rose), NRHP-listed
- Wauwatosa Woman's Club Clubhouse, 1626 Wauwatosa Ave. Wauwatosa, WI (Kirchhoff & Rose), NRHP-listed
- Mount Olive Lutheran Church at 5327 W. Washington Blvd, Milwaukee. 1923.
