= Wauwatosa Woman's Club Clubhouse =

- U.S. National Register of Historic Places
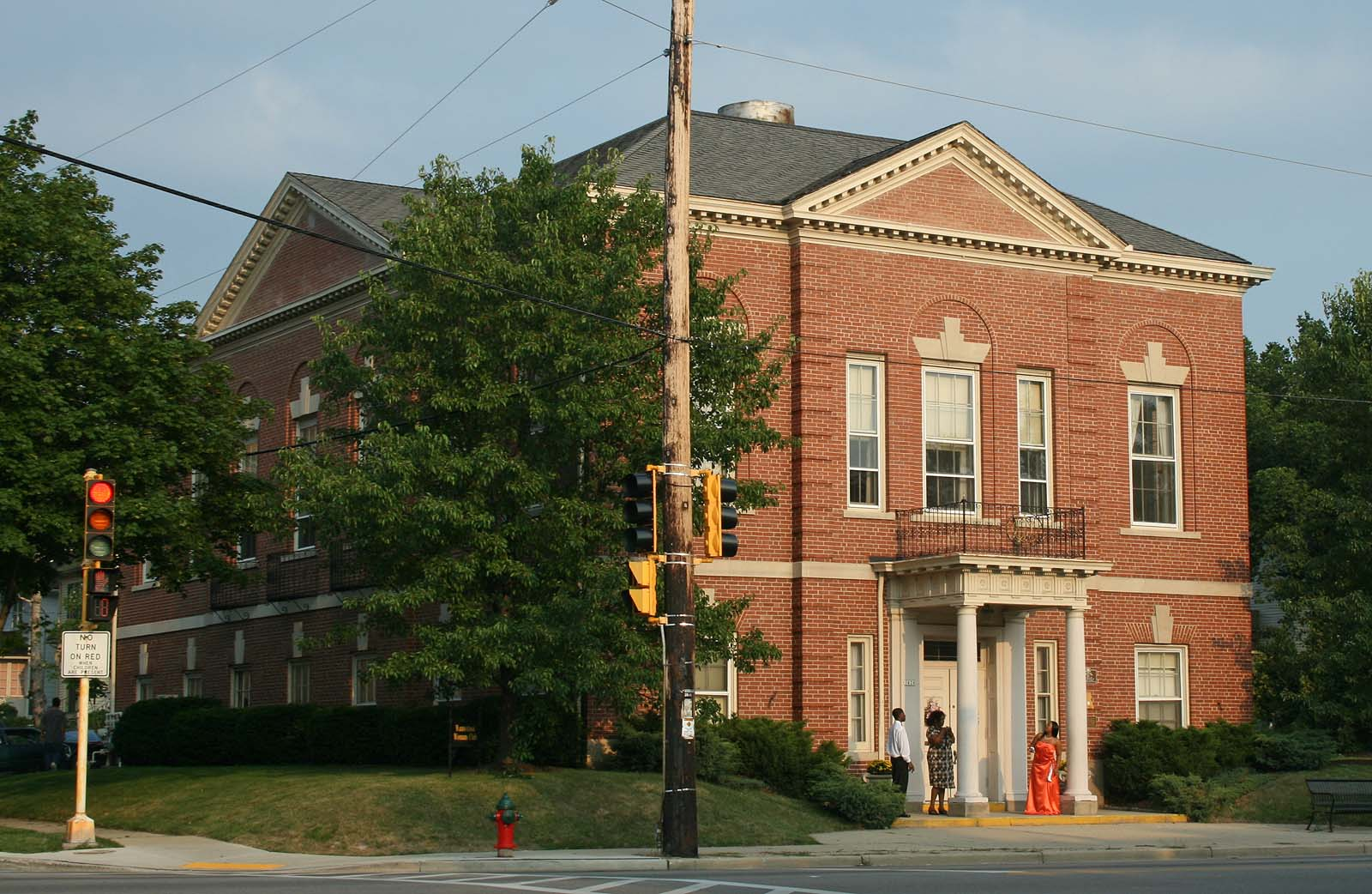
- Wauwatosa Woman's Club Clubhouse
- Location: 1626 Wauwatosa Ave. Wauwatosa, Wisconsin
- Coordinates: 43.05247°N 88.00711°W
- Built: 1924-1925
- Architect: Kirchoff & Rose
- Architectural style: Colonial Revival
- NRHP reference No.: 98000828
- Added to NRHP: July 1, 1998

The Wauwatosa Woman's Club Clubhouse is located in Wauwatosa, Wisconsin. It was added to the National Register of Historic Places in 1998.

== Wauwatosa Woman's Club ==
The Wauwatosa Woman's Club was founded in 1894. It was incorporated in 1907. The stated purpose of the club was “The social and intellectual development of women through a free interchange of thought, by a course of careful study, essays and discussions.” In 1914 Emerson D. Hoyt donated the lot on 1626 Wauwatosa Avenue for a clubhouse, with the provision that the structure also be used as a museum to preserve the early history of Wauwatosa. Hoyt also stipulated that the woman's club members would need to raise $10,000 within two years' time. The project faltered with onset of World War I, but the women were given an extension and ultimately raise the required amount. The clubhouse become a social center for the women of Wauwatosa. The club remains active.

== Building ==
The Wauwatosa Woman's Club Clubhouse was designed by Kirchhoff & Rose in the Colonial Revival style and completed in 1925. The building is two stories, with a hip and deck roof. The walls are clad in red brick with white trim. The front entrance is sheltered by a portico supported by Tuscan columns and pilasters. Behind it, the center bay is framed in brick quoins. Many windows are topped with a keystone design and framed in a shallow brick arch. The eaves are trimmed with a modillioned cornice and a large pediment tops the center bay. The clubhouse was listed on the National Register of Historic Places in 1998.
