= Uline =

Shipping supply company

Uline, Inc.
- Type: Private, family-owned
- Industry: Industrial supplies wholesaling
- Founded: 1980; 46 years ago in Lake Forest, Illinois
- Founder: Richard and Elizabeth Uihlein
- Headquarters: Pleasant Prairie, Wisconsin
- Products: Shipping boxes; Plastic bags; Packing materials; Warehouse equipment; Janitorial supplies
- Revenue: US$11 billion (2023)
- Number of employees: 9,392 (2023)
- Website: www.uline.com

Uline, Inc. is an American private company offering shipping and business supplies throughout North America. Founded in 1980 by Richard and Elizabeth Uihlein, the company has more than 9,000 employees and is headquartered in Pleasant Prairie, Wisconsin.

== History ==
Uline was founded in 1980 by Elizabeth "Liz" and Richard "Dick" Uihlein. Richard Uihlein is a descendant of the brewers of Schlitz beer. With start-up funds from his father, Edgar Uihlein, Richard and Elizabeth founded the company from their basement after recognizing a local need for a shipping supply distributor. The company's first product was the H-101 carton sizer. Its success enabled the Uihleins to move into a new headquarters in Waukegan, Illinois.

Over the 1980s and 1990s, operations began in Minnesota, California and New Jersey. In the 2000s, Uline began operations in Mexico and Canada and opened distribution centers in Illinois, Texas, Georgia, Wisconsin, and Pennsylvania. The Uline catalog grew to 450 pages, offering over 17,000 products.

In 2008, Uline announced it was constructing a new headquarters in Pleasant Prairie, Wisconsin. The move was partially motivated by the Uihleins' ties to Wisconsin; Richard Uihlein's family had lived in Milwaukee and founded the Joseph Schlitz Brewing Company, and the couple owns a home and restaurant in Manitowish Waters. Wisconsin Governor Jim Doyle expected 1,000 jobs would move to Southeastern Wisconsin, and pledged $6 million to support the move. The 200-acre headquarters opened in the summer of 2010, featuring offices for Uline staff and a 1-million square foot warehouse which supplies products to distribution centers. Due to increasing growth, an expansion consisting of a second office building and warehouse was announced in 2014. Construction began in early 2016 and was completed in 2017. The expansion brought about 800 additional jobs to Pleasant Prairie.

In 2019, Uline began considering a second major expansion with two more distribution centers with a combined area of over 1.7 million square feet. The distribution centers would complement two existing Uline distribution centers in Pleasant Prairie.

In 2021, Uline opened a warehouse in Reno, Nevada, to service Nevada and Northern California.

== Company overview ==
The company is owned by the Uihlein family and set up as a passthrough corporation. ProPublica stated that as of August 2021, Richard and Elizabeth own a majority of the company. Elizabeth Uihlein serves as president and chief executive officer, her husband Richard Uihlein is chairman of the board of directors. All three of their children are company executives; Duke Uihlein is the Minnesota branch manager, Freddy Goldenberg is the corporate planning manager, and Brian Uihlein is the vice president of merchandising. Richard Uihlein's brother Steve also serves as a vice president.

The Uline headquarters is located on 200 acres (81 ha) in Pleasant Prairie, Wisconsin. The headquarters consists of two buildings: a 279,000 square feet (25,900 m^{2}) facility, and a newer (2017) building of about the same size. Plans to begin work on a third building for its corporate campus that would be 325,000 square feet in size were announced in January 2024.

The company was previously headquartered in Waukegan, Illinois, but moved to Pleasant Prairie, Wisconsin, in 2010, in return for up to $18.6 million in state incentives.

The company regularly holds career fairs at its warehouses. The company uses workers on H-1B and temporary work visas.

Uline performs follicle drug testing on its employees. The company has a conservative dress code, with ties mandatory for men, pantyhose and skirts for women between November and April, and tattoos discouraged.

== Operations and marketing ==
In 2015, Uline began using hydrogen powered forklifts in its Pleasant Prairie facility and between then and 2024, their use expanded to five other facilities. In 2024, it was announced that they would begin using them in four more facilities.

An important marketing tool for Uline is its product catalog, which has been produced since its founding. Mailed twice a year, the catalog is 800 pages long and advertises over 37,500 products. Uline also relies on extensive online advertising. The company is not believed to have a communications department, and maintains a low profile on social media.

== Financial information ==
In 2014, the company was estimated to have $2 billion in revenue. ProPublica estimates the company made nearly a billion dollars in profit in 2018. As of February 2020, the company reported having over 6,700 employees and over $5.8 billion in revenue.

== Corporate philanthropy ==
The company donated $3 million to the city of Kenosha, Wisconsin, to help it build housing in 2023. The company operates a scholarship fund for the children of employees pursuing post-secondary education and a scholarship open to the general public.

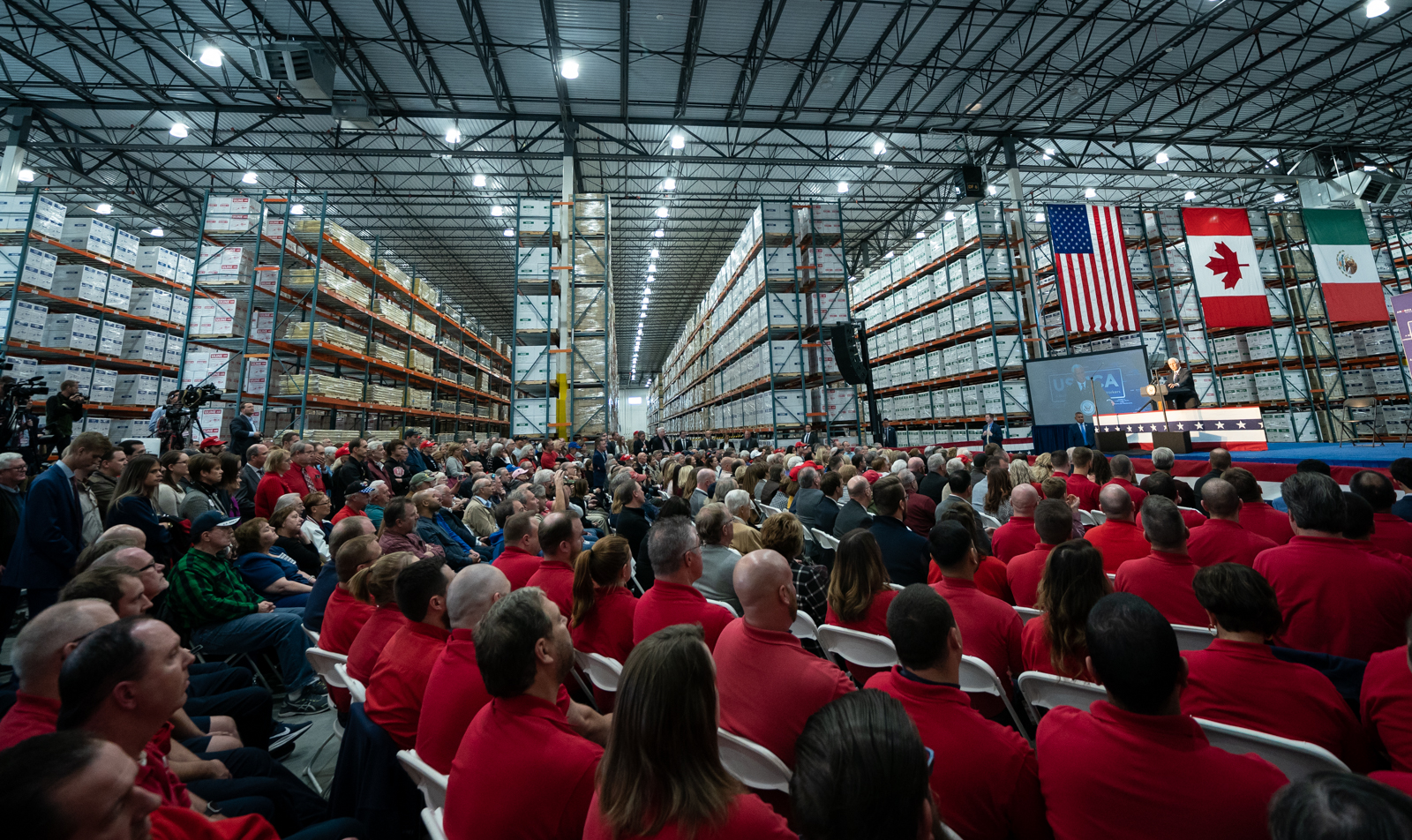
Uline workers at a warehouse in Pleasant Prairie listen to US Vice President Mike Pence speak on the USMCA free trade agreement in 2019.

== Political activities ==
Elizabeth and Richard Uihlein are major donors to far-right conservative and Republican causes. The company and its employees have also extensively donated to conservative and Republican-affiliated political action committees; they were among the largest contributors to political campaigns during the 2020 election cycle, contributing over $31 million before June 2020.

The company has been known to invite conservative politicians to company facilities to speak with employees. They have contributed to candidates who have denied the results of the 2020 US presidential election and participated in the January 6 attack on the United States Capitol.

Elizabeth Uihlein frequently includes her writings in the company catalog, some of which reflect her political views. Past columns have had topics ranging from "the danger of Chinese competition, the negative health effects of marijuana use and the detriments of the Federal Reserve's low interest rate policy."
