= Truesdell, Wisconsin =

Coordinates: 42°34′00″N 87°54′04″W

Truesdell is a residential and business neighborhood of the city of Kenosha in east-central Kenosha County, Wisconsin, United States. It lies along Highway 50 on the former Milwaukee Road (now Canadian Pacific) main railroad line from Chicago, Illinois (C&M Subdivision). The last Milwaukee Road passenger trains stopped in Truesdell in 1945, but there are still switching facilities present. The community was settled by Gideon and Julia Truesdell in the 19th century, but the community itself has disappeared within the city of Kenosha and related surrounding development, though some businesses still identify with the original name. The Truesdell post office, organized in 1870, closed on May 1, 1953; its postmistress, Mrs. Jennie H. Alsted, had operated it from her home's back porch for 31 years.
