= Lloyd Pettit =

American sportscaster

- Born: March 22, 1927; Chicago, Illinois, US
- Died: November 11, 2003 (aged 76); Fox Point, Wisconsin, US
- Occupation: Sportscaster

Lloyd Pettit (March 22, 1927 – November 11, 2003) was a sportscaster in Chicago and Milwaukee as well as the owner of the Milwaukee Admirals.

== Early life ==
Pettit was born in Chicago to Howard William Pettit and Audrey Lenora (née Richey), he had a sister named Lois. As a small child, his family moved to the Milwaukee suburb of Shorewood, Wisconsin where he graduated from Shorewood High School. He went on to study at Northwestern University, and graduated in 1950 with a degree in television and radio journalism. He was a member of the Sigma Chi Fraternity. He worked as a Wisconsin sports broadcaster at WMAW and later WTMJ Radio until 1956.

== Chicago sports broadcaster ==
Pettit returned to Chicago, where he was a sports broadcaster on WGN-TV and WGN Radio for a variety of different teams during the 1960s, including the Chicago Cubs and Chicago White Sox. He usually worked as the sidekick for the main TV announcer, Jack Brickhouse. His baseball broadcasting style could be described as low-key and businesslike, compared with the excitable Brickhouse. He also broadcast the Chicago Bears, when Brickhouse was busy covering the Cubs or White Sox.

Pettit is most fondly remembered by fans of the Chicago Blackhawks of the National Hockey League. His first love in sports was ice hockey, and he shone at coverage of that sport. He was the original choice to broadcast the NHL's national games on CBS in the late '60s, but Jack Brickhouse, who ran WGN-TV's sports operations, would not release him from his contract to do the games, and the assignment went instead to Dan Kelly of the St. Louis Blues. That dispute led to his, and the team's, moving to WMAQ Radio in 1970. During his career, the Hawks had a number of highs and lows. Regardless, Pettit covered the games with enthusiasm and expertise. His signature catchphrase, which was even worked into the Blackhawks official fight song, "Here Come The Hawks," was "There's a shot... AND A GOAL!!!" He retired from the Blackhawks in 1976, after a dispute over the quality of his broadcast partners, and from all broadcasting in 1980 to pursue other business interests. He was presented with the Foster Hewitt Memorial Award by the Hockey Hall of Fame in 1986.

== Milwaukee Admirals ==
After his broadcasting career finished, Pettit and his wife Jane returned to Wisconsin full-time. They bought the Milwaukee Admirals of the International Hockey League (now in the American Hockey League) in 1976. The Pettits were instrumental in getting the Bradley Center built, in the hopes of securing an NHL franchise, though the Pettits withdrew their bid when they felt the expansion fee was too high. The arena became the home of the Admirals and the National Basketball Association's Milwaukee Bucks, with whom they also had minority ownership.

He, and his wife, Jane Bradley Pettit, were both elected to the Wisconsin Athletic Hall of Fame in 1993.

In 1994, Pettit and Jane were honored with the "Lombardi Award of Excellence" from the Vince Lombardi Cancer Foundation. The award was created to honor Coach Lombardi's legacy, and is awarded annually to an individual who exemplifies the spirit of the Coach.

== See also ==
- Pettit National Ice Center
