= David Vogel Uihlein Sr. =

- Born: David Vogel Uihlein; July 27, 1920; Milwaukee, Wisconsin, US
- Died: January 29, 2010 (aged 89); Mequon, Wisconsin, US
- Spouses: Jane Bradley Pettit (m. 1945, divorced) Margery Holley (m. 1966)
- Parent: Joseph E. Uihlein

David Vogel Uihlein Sr. (July 27, 1920 – January 29, 2010) was an American businessman and heir to the Joseph Schlitz Brewing Company.

== Early life ==
David Vogel Uihlein was born in Milwaukee, Wisconsin on July 27, 1920, to Joseph E. Uihlein and Ilma Vogel, granddaughter of Frederick Vogel Sr. His grandfather was August Uihlein. He attended the Milwaukee Country Day School and The Hill School in Pottstown, Pennsylvania. He attended the U.S. Brewers Academy in New York City. In 1940–41, he attended the University of Wisconsin, where he played on the football team. During the Second World War, he served as an ambulance driver for the American Field Service in Italy, Austria and India.

== Career ==
Uihlein purchased Banner Welder Inc. in 1949, and he served as its president. In 1961, he acquired the Oshkosh Brewing Co. in Oshkosh, Wisconsin and ran it until 1969. In 1972, he joined the board of directors of the Joseph Schlitz Brewing Company. He also served on the Boards of Allen-Bradley, Briggs & Stratton and First Wisconsin Bank.

== Hobbies ==
Uihlein was the founder and president of the Milwaukee chapter of the Ruffed Grouse Society. He actively supported Ducks Unlimited, the Trout and Salmon Foundation and the Nature Conservancy.

Uihlein won the 10-lap vintage race at the inaugural Wisconsin Grand Prix at State Fair Park on August 15, 1954. He set the fastest time of the day at 69.09 mph in his classic Alfa Romeo.

Uihlein collected antique cars, especially 1930's Indianapolis 500 race cars, old boats, airplanes, and duck decoys. A 1925 Bugatti won a blue ribbon in 1989 at the Pebble Beach Concours d'Elegance. In 1995, he founded the Harry Miller Meet.

== Personal life and death ==
In 1945, Uihlein married Jane Bradley Pettit, whose father had co-founded Allen-Bradley with her uncle, Lynde Bradley. They had a son, David Vogel Uihlein Jr., and a daughter, Lynde Bradley Uihlein.

In 1966, Uihlein married Margery (Holley) Uihlein, the daughter of George M. Holley, co-founder of Holley Performance Products.

Uihlein died at his home in Mequon, Wisconsin, on January 29, 2010.
