= Robert Uihlein Jr. =

German-American heir, businessman, polo player and philanthropist

- Born: March 26, 1916; Milwaukee, Wisconsin, U.S.
- Died: November 12, 1976 (aged 60); Wauwatosa, Wisconsin, U.S.
- Education: Phillips Academy
- Alma mater: Harvard University; University of Wisconsin Law School
- Occupations: Businessman; polo player; philanthropist
- Parent: Robert Uihlein Sr.
- Relatives: August Uihlein (paternal grandfather); August Krug (great-uncle)

Robert Uihlein Jr. (1916–1976) was a German-American heir, businessman, polo player, and philanthropist.

== Early life ==
Robert Uihlein Jr. was born on March 26, 1916, in Milwaukee, Wisconsin. His father was Robert Uihlein Sr., and his grandfather August Uihlein. His great-great uncle, August Krug, was the founder of the Joseph Schlitz Brewing Company.

Uihlein attended the Phillips Academy in Andover, Massachusetts, where he graduated in 1934. He received a Bachelor of Science from Harvard University in 1938 and a law degree from the University of Wisconsin Law School in 1941. He then attended the U.S. Brewers Academy and the Wallerstein Laboratories in New York.

== Career ==
Uihlein joined the family business, Joseph Schlitz Brewing Company, full-time in the sales staff department, in 1942. He became vice president in 1945, vice president of sales in 1951, executive vice president in 1959, and president of the company in 1961. In 1967, he became chairman of the board of directors. He also served on the board of directors of the United States Brewers' Association.He was one of four key figures at Milwaukee Brewers, Inc., along with Allan "Bud" Selig, Judge Robert C. Cannon, and Edmund Fitzgerald, who helped bring the Seattle Pilots baseball team to Milwaukee in April 1970.

== Polo ==
As a polo player, Uihlein won the U.S. Open Polo Championship in 1951 and 1961. He also won several Sunshine League and Twenty Goal titles. He served as a governor of the United States Polo Association from 1949 to 1953 and again from 1955 to 1974. He co-founded the Milwaukee Polo Club. He was inducted into the Museum of Polo and Hall of Fame in Lake Worth, Florida, on February 17, 2001.

== Philanthropy ==
Uihlein supported the American Cancer Society, the National Business Committee for the Arts, and the New York Philharmonic.

== Death and legacy ==
Uihlein died from complications of leukemia on November 12, 1976. His sons, Robin and James Uihlein, play polo at the Sarasota Polo Club in Sarasota, Florida. His family owns the Schroeder-Manatee Ranch, which comprises Lakewood Ranch, Florida, the Sarasota Polo Club, and the Lakewood Ranch Golf & Country Club.
