= Richard and Elizabeth Uihlein =

American business people

- Pronunciation: /ˈjuːlaɪn/ YOO-lyne
- Employer: Uline
- Political party: Republican
- Children: 3
- Relatives: Uihlein family

Richard and Elizabeth Uihlein (/ˈjuːlaɪn/ YOO-lyne) are American billionaire owners of business supply company Uline, heirs to the Schlitz brewing fortune, and major financial supporters of the Republican Party.

== Biographies ==
Richard Uihlein was born to Schlitz beer founder descendant and noted conservative Edgar Uihlein and Lucia Ellis Uihlein. He graduated from Phillips Andover and from Stanford University with a BA in history. Until 1980, Uihlein worked in international sales for General Binding Corporation, a company his father co-founded. Uihlein's cousin is Lynde Bradley Uihlein.

Richard's father, Edgar Uihlein, was a prominent conservative figure in the 1960s and 1970s. He sat on the John Birch Society's finance committee, donated to the presidential campaign of segregationist candidate George Wallace, and supported General Edwin Walker, who led an insurrection in response to the racial integration of the University of Mississippi.

Elizabeth Anne Uihlein was born to Robert Emerson Hallberg, an auto company executive, and Elizabeth Pierce Hallberg of Winnetka, Illinois. She had a sister, Katherine Hallberg, who died in 1997. She is the cousin of Martin Hanson, a Wisconsin environmentalist who fought for federal protection of Lake Superior's Apostle Islands.

The Uihleins have three children. The couple's primary residence is in Lake Forest, Illinois, but they own several homes and are noted part-time residents of Manitowish Waters, Wisconsin.

== Business activities ==
=== Uline ===
In 1980, with start-up funds from Richard's father, Elizabeth and Richard founded Uline, a shipping supplies company. The company expanded rapidly and is now one of the largest privately held U.S. companies; in 2014, Forbes estimated its value as between $700 million and $2 billion. As of 2020, the company had around 7,000 employees. Elizabeth Uihlein is the company's president and Richard is the CEO; their three children hold executive roles.

=== EAU Holdings ===
Elizabeth and Richard own and operate a number of businesses in downtown Manitowish Waters under EAU Holdings Inc, a holding company advertised on Uline's website. Businesses owned by the entity include a gym, a restaurant, various lodgings, a coffee shop, a salon, a spa, and gift shops.

=== Galectin Therapeutics ===
Richard Uihlein is the chairman of the board for Galectin Therapeutics, a publicly traded biotech company focusing on treatments for chronic liver disease and cancer. He is its largest individual stock holder.

== Political activities ==
=== Views and history ===
==== Richard ====
Richard Uihlein has been a Republican donor for decades, and increased his political giving after Citizens United v. Federal Election Commission. He has been a longtime donor to Republicans who share his ultra-conservative views. He is a staunch social and economic conservative, with views that are anti-union, anti-tax, and pro-deregulation. He has supported Republican candidates and has often supported efforts in opposition to LGBTQ rights as well as abortion. Richard Uihlein has been described as a person who "shuns the spotlight"; he rarely gives interviews.

==== Elizabeth ====
Elizabeth has said her mother was a liberal and her father a conservative. She has said she held liberal beliefs in her early years.

Like her husband, Elizabeth rarely gives interviews, but she frequently makes statements about her political views in a column that appears in the Uline catalog and on the Uline website. Past columns have addressed topics including "the danger of Chinese competition", "the negative health effects of marijuana use", and "the detriments of the Federal Reserve's low interest rate policy". During the COVID-19 pandemic in the United States, Elizabeth Uihlein called the pandemic "overhyped", and in November 2020 she criticized stay-at-home directives issued to combat the virus's spread. Elizabeth Uihlein focuses her donations on the main GOP organizations, such as the Republican National Committee, National Republican Senatorial Committee, and National Republican Congressional Committee.

=== National politics ===
Richard Uihlein is the biggest donor to Women Speak Out PAC, a group seeking a federal abortion ban. He has also donated millions to Restoration PAC, according to which "all marriage is for one man and one woman for life". He has supported conservative groups and candidates including Ted Cruz, Roy Moore, The Club for Growth, and the Illinois Policy Institute. Uihlein has also been a major donor to Liberty Principles PAC, Americas PAC, and Scott Walker.

==== 2014 election cycle ====
In the 2014 election cycle, the Uihleins made at least $5 million in political contributions, mostly to right-wing PACs ($1.8 million to Liberty Principles PAC, $670,000 to Americas PAC, and slightly under $500,000 to Jim DeMint's Senate Conservatives Fund and affiliated super PAC).

==== 2016 election cycle ====
The Uihleins gave $22 million in the 2016 election cycle. In the 2016 Republican primaries, Uihlein initially supported Scott Walker and Ted Cruz; after they both dropped out of the race, Uihlein backed Donald Trump, contributing money to the pro-Trump "Great America PAC" and $500,000 to Trump's inauguration, which he attended. He also donated hundreds of thousands of dollars to the Republican National Committee.

==== 2018 election cycle ====
In the 2018 election cycle, Richard dramatically increased his political contributions, making $37.7 million in contributions to outside spending groups (the fourth-largest donor to such groups). His contributions include support for many Republican candidates in competitive primary races, such as Chris McDaniel. Also in 2018, Uihlein gave financial support to Kevin Nicholson, a one-time long-shot Republican candidate for U.S. Senate in Wisconsin; eight super PACs Uihlein funded also supported Nicholson. They contributed $4 million to the Fair Courts America PAC.

===== Donations to Roy Moore =====
Richard supported Roy Moore for U.S. Senate. The support began on September 8, 2017, before sexual misconduct allegations against Moore came to light, with a contribution of $50,000 to Moore's Proven Conservative PAC. On November 22, 2017, after multiple women, some of whom where underage at the time of the alleged offense, had come forward accusing Moore of sexual assault, Richard donated another $50,000 to the Proven Conservative PAC.

===== Pay for play newspapers =====
From 2016 to 2018, a political action committee the Uihleins funded gave at least $646,000 to a new network of free newspapers and websites created by Brian Timpone that mimics local newspapers but offers pay-for-play articles to conservative clients.

==== 2020 election cycle ====
In the 2020 election cycle, the Uihleins and their company had, by April 2020, contributed $1.5 million to Trump's "America First Action" super PAC and $20 million to other Republican groups.

Uihlein was a major financial backer for the rally that preceded the January 6 United States Capitol attack. From 2015 to 2020, the Uihleins donated $4.3 million (including $800,000 in October 2020) to Tea Party Patriots, a group that participated in the March to Save America rally that preceded the attack.

After it was reported that the Uihleins were a major financial backer for the rally that preceded the January 6 attack, Northwestern University reviewed its contract with Uline at a university donor's behest. Upon conclusion of the review, Northwestern continued its contract with the company.

In November 2020, the Uihleins announced to their company that they had contracted COVID-19 after media speculation that they had been infected during Trump's White House election result watch party. Journalists made this speculation after the Uihleins' personal jet flew to DC on the evening of the election and a string of COVID-19 infections befell known attendees. Elizabeth insisted that they had not attended Trump's party and had instead contracted it from a friend.

==== 2022 election cycle ====
During the 2022 election cycle, they contributed to the U.S. Senate campaigns of Herschel Walker, Ron Johnson, and Adam Laxalt. Other politicians the Uihleins supported include Georgia representative Jody Hice and Texas representative Louie Gohmert.

==== 2024 election cycle ====
As of October 2024, Richard Uihlein had given nearly $59 million in 2024 to Restoration PAC, a leading pro-Trump super PAC that is active in the battleground states of Pennsylvania, Wisconsin, and Georgia.

==== 2026 election cycle ====
The Uihleins spent $150 million in support of Republican candidates in the 2026 United States elections. Most of that, $136.7 million, went to the Restoration of America PAC. Other notable recipients were a PAC supporting Jessi Ebben (a Republican House candidate in Wisconsin's 7th congressional district) and a conservative super PAC that focuses on judicial races.

=== State politics ===
Richard is a significant supporter of the Foundation for Government Accountability, a think tank that has worked to relax child labor laws in 22 states.

In September 2022, Richard donated $750,000 to help defeat a ballot question that would legalize recreational cannabis in Wisconsin.

The Uihleins spent hundreds of thousands of dollars in the 2011 Wisconsin Senate recall elections in support of state senators facing recall over their support for legislation to end collective bargaining for public employees, and also backed litigation against public-employee unions, including Janus v. AFSCME. During the COVID-19 pandemic in the United States, Elizabeth called upon Republican members of the Wisconsin Legislature to push to remove Governor Tony Evers from office over the stay-at-home directives he issued.

Richard Uihlein spent $2.6 million in support of Illinois Governor Bruce Rauner in his successful 2014 Illinois gubernatorial election campaign. Uihlein broke with Rauner after he signed legislation in 2017 that expanded abortion coverage for women on Medicaid; Uihlein gave millions to Jeanne Ives, who challenged Rauner in the 2018 Republican primary.

During the 2022 Illinois gubernatorial election; Richard Uihlein gave more than $42 million to "People Who Play By The Rules PAC", a super PAC that ran attack ads against Illinois Governor J. B. Pritzker to boost the candidacy of Republican nominee Darren Bailey. The super PAC was operated by Republican operative and talk radio host Dan Proft. Richard Uihlein also gave $10 million directly to Bailey's campaign.

During Ohio's 2023 August special election cycle, Richard Uihlein donated $4 million to a PAC supporting Issue 1, an effort to require a 60% majority to pass citizen-initiated constitutional amendments. The measure was defeated by a 57% to 43% margin.

During the 2022 election cycle, the Uihleins were the largest donors to Doug Mastriano's 2022 Pennsylvania gubernatorial campaign.

Between 2019 and 2020, Uihlein gave $250,000 to Allen West's campaign for the chairmanship of the Texas Republican Party against incumbent James Dickey.

=== Local politics ===
The Uihleins own several houses in the United States and frequently inject themselves into local politics via large donations to the city governments where they own homes. Their primary residence is in Lake Forest, Illinois, but they also own residential property in Lake Bluff. They own two lake houses in Wisconsin, one in Manitowish Waters and one in Hayward on Kavanagh Bay. Elizabeth is heavily involved in the politics and commerce of Manitowish Waters via EAU Holdings. The couple owns multiple properties in Florida.

The Uihelins contributed $3.2 million to the American Principles Project PAC between 2020 and 2022, which ran campaign ads for school board races with messages against "transgender ideology" and critical race theory.

==== Manitowish Waters, Wisconsin ====
Elizabeth is heavily involved in politics and economy of Manitowish Waters, Wisconsin, where she and Richard own a large summer house on Spider Lake. Of her work in the town, she has said, "I'm 'up north', my husband's political".

Her investment in area businesses began with the 1998 purchase of a motel as a "defensive move" against a Pakistani buyer who was rumored to be interested. She claims that under his management the motel would have been "doomed to fail". Elizabeth has said that her operations in the town were not profitable as of 2015.

It is estimated that the Uihleins invested $6.5 million in the town between 2007 and 2015. In January 2018, they pledged $1.15 million to the Wisconsin DNR for the purpose of maintaining and expanding bike paths in Manitowish Waters. Elizabeth has since donated to Manitowish Waters Bike Trail Inc via the LUMW Foundation, giving $71,383 in 2022.

Agreements giving Elizabeth considerable control over Rest Lake Park and local trails have been highly contentious among area residents. Complaints commonly center around the park and trails having an overly manicured appearance, with residents and officials saying trails have too much grass on their margins and too many trees have been removed.

Elizabeth has been known to offer advice on how to improve the aesthetics of Manitowish Waters businesses to their owners in conjunction with offers to pay for the repairs herself.

===== Rest Lake Lodge =====
In August 2015, unpermitted clear cutting was performed at the Rest Lake Lodge, one of the businesses owned by EAU. The work was found to have violated rules related to removing trees near a body of water. Elizabeth's attorney blamed the cutting on her contractor's ignorance of local regulations, but acknowledged that it was her idea. Under a restitution plan approved in October 2015, the Uihleins were required to revegetate the area and pay a $750 fine.

Also in 2015, Elizabeth motioned to purchase the lake frontage connect to the same property from the Wisconsin DNR after it was made available for sale following actions by the Republican-led state legislature under Governor Scott Walker, whom the Uihleins had heavily supported. Due to critiques of the sale centering around price and the frontage connecting two other protected wooded areas, the sale was tabled in September 2015, but in August 2016 a revised version of the deal including a land and frontage swap was approved.

An unapproved 500-foot trail on the DNR land parcel sought by the Uihleins was discovered in the second half of 2015. Elizabeth denied creating the trail, but said that her employees may have performed light cleaning of the area.

==== Hayward, Wisconsin ====
In 2015 and 2016, Richard attempted to form an agreement with Utility company Xcel Energy, the Wisconsin Department of Natural Resources, and the U.S. Army Corps of Engineers to have a floating bog that was blocking the dock to his home in Hayward on Kavanagh Bay nailed down to the lake bed. Normally, when floating bogs become a nuisance to boaters, area residents push them away with their boats.

==== Lake Bluff and Lake Forest, Illinois ====
In June 2023, the Uihleins petitioned for a two-year exemption from a seasonal ban on the use of leaf blowers for their Lake Bluff home. The regulation contained such an exemption for public properties, like parks, that are more than 20 acres in size, and they argued that their home should qualify as it was 22 acres in size. Their request was denied.

Richard donated to elect a group of school board members for the district that included the "chief critic" of Lake Forest High School's first black principal, Chala Holland. Of Holland, a critique of academic tracking, Richard wrote, "I cannot sit by and watch the current administration sacrifice open, honest communication, sacrifice academic excellence and sacrifice my tax dollars."

==== Palatine, Illinois ====
Richard donated money to community groups and school board campaigns that sought to roll back policies that allow students to use school facilities consistent with their gender identities.

=== Involvement in conservative media ===
In the lead-up to the 2014 U.S. Senate race in Texas, Richard donated $450,571.65 to finance a newspaper that published false stories about Representative Steve Stockman's opponent, Senator John Cornyn, suggesting that he "wanted to ban veterans from having guns, had voted to fund abortion, and was secretly working with Democrats to grant amnesty to illegal immigrants". This was discovered when the donation was investigated as an attempt by Stockman to subvert limits on coordinated campaign spending.

Richard Uihlein has had a longstanding financial relationship with conservative newspaper producer Brian Timpone. Since 2004, Timpone has worked to build a network of locally published free Internet and print news. These newspapers often employ names that are similar to respected local institutions but are unaffiliated with them. The articles he publishes often reference real events, but he has been accused of severely distorting facts to create emotional responses in his readers. Timpone's companies have been known to offer pay-for-play articles to conservative clients. From 2016 to 2018, a political action committee the Uihleins funded gave at least $646,000 to a network of newspapers and websites Timpone created.

People Who Play By The Rules PAC, which contributed money to Timpone's operations during the 2022 Illinois races, received more than $42 million from Richard Uihlein. During the lead-up to the 2022 election, Timpone's operations blanketed the state in confusingly titled free newspapers that attacked Governor JB Pritzker and other Illinois Democrats.

In October 2024, ProPublica traced a newspaper delivered to Wisconsinites, The Wisconsin Catholic Tribune, which was unaffiliated with the Catholic Church and painted Trump as pro-Catholic and Biden as anti-Catholic, to Timpone and Uihlein. The company producing the newspapers, which is owned by Timpone, was paid by Restoration PAC, which had received $125 million from Richard between 2020 and the article's publication.

Richard is a supporter of Turning Point USA, a conservative youth organization formed in 2012 with a strong media arm. Between 2014 and 2016, he donated $275,000 to it. On January 13, 2021, shortly after the January 6 attack, he donated $250,000 to it.

RealClearPolitics and The Federalist are also significant recipients of funds from the Ed Uihlein foundtation, Richard Uihlein's philanthropic entity.

== Philanthropy ==
=== Elizabeth ===
Elizabeth operates the LUMW Foundation. The foundation primarily gives to organizations in Chicago's northern suburbs and in and around Manitowish Waters.

Tax Year	Contributions to LUMW by Elizabeth
2020	5,031,766
2021	3,053,250
2022	5,600,000
2023	4,042,843

=== Richard ===
Richard operates the Ed Uihlein Family Foundation. He frequently donates to think tanks and nonprofits such as the Conservative Partnership Institute, Turning Point USA, Sons of Liberty, the Center for Security Policy, Liberty Justice Center, and Think Freely Media. In addition, the foundation gives to schools, clinics, churches, Uline's scholarship fund, and environmental causes.

Through his foundation, Richard made $40 million in grants between 2013 and 2016 to organizations such as the Intercollegiate Studies Institute, the Institute for Humane Studies, the Media Research Center, the Leadership Institute, and the Philanthropy Roundtable. The Ed Uihlein Family Foundation has also donated to the American Enterprise Institute, Americans for Prosperity, the Institute for Free Speech, and the Clare Boothe Luce Policy Institute.

Tax Year	Contributions to the Ed Uihlein Family by Richard
2020	16,863,500
2021	4,535,000
2022	11,400,000
2023	6,850,000

==== Involvement with Steve Stockman and Freedom House ====
In January 2013, Richard gave $350,000 to U.S. Representative Steve Stockman and his congressional aid Thomas Dodd for "Freedom House", a facility that "would serve as a meeting place, dormitory and training facility for young [Republican] people". It was supposedly connected to a nonprofit called the Congressional Freedom Foundation, which did not exist. Stockman and Dodd used the money for self-promotion and self-enrichments; none was used to fund Freedom House.

In February 2013, Richard donated $450,571.65 to finance a newspaper that published false news stories about Stockman's opponent, Senator John Cornyn, suggesting that he "wanted to ban veterans from having guns, had voted to fund abortion, and was secretly working with Democrats to grant amnesty to illegal immigrants". The paper was produced by a nonprofit named the Center for the American Future, which was controlled by Stockman's aide Jason Posey, which led to allegations that Posey subverted campaign finance donation limits on coordinated spending.
