= David Vogel Uihlein Jr. =

American architect

David Vogel Uihlein Jr. is an American businessman, heir, and philanthropist.

== Early life ==
His mother was Jane Bradley Pettit, a philanthropist. His maternal grandfather was Harry Lynde Bradley, co-founder of Allen-Bradley and the Bradley Foundation with his granduncle, Lynde Bradley. His father was David Vogel Uihlein Sr., heir to the Joseph Schlitz Brewing Company. His paternal great-grandfather was August Uihlein. His sister is Lynde Bradley Uihlein, a Democratic philanthropist.

== Career ==
An architect, he is the president of Uihlein-Wilson Architects, a real estate company. He has served as vice chairman of the conservative Bradley Foundation since November 2006.

== Philanthropy ==
He chairs the David & Julia Uihlein Charitable Foundation. He sits on the board of trustees of the Wisconsin Conservatory of Music.

== Personal life ==
In June 1974, he married Julia Pickard Aring.
