= Joseph E. Uihlein =

American brewer and banker

Joseph E. Uihlein (December 23, 1875 – January 8, 1968) was an American brewer and banker who served as general manager and vice-president of the Joseph Schlitz Brewing Company and president of the Second Ward Savings Bank.

== Early life and education ==
Joseph E. Uihlein was born on December 23, 1875, in the home of his parents, August Uihlein and Emilie Werdehof Uihlein, in Milwaukee, Wisconsin. He was Uihlein's second child and eldest son of six children. Uihlein attended Stanford University between 1897 and 1899 and graduated from Cornell University in 1901.

== Career ==
Uihlein served as President of the Second Ward Savings Bank.

== Personal life ==
Uihlein married Ilma Vogel Uihlein, granddaughter of Frederick Vogel, on November 17, 1904. They had five children: Louise, Joseph Jr., John, Elizabeth, and David. The family lived in a 36,000 square foot Elizabethan-style mansion designed by Milwaukee architects Kirchhoff & Rose. Beginning in 1929 they also owned Afterglow Farm, a farm and residence north of Port Washington, Wisconsin.
