= Judith Sweet =

American sports executive

Judith M. Sweet (born 1948) (Note: In 1991, Sweet was reported to be 43) is an American sports executive. In the 1980s and 1990s, she was the first woman to be elected secretary-treasurer and president of the National Collegiate Athletic Association. She was also the first female athletic director to run both the men's and women's programs at the University of California, San Diego. In 2006, ESPN listed her among the top 100 most influential student-athletes.

== Early life and education ==
Sweet was the youngest daughter born to parents Sam and Ann Sweet in Milwaukee with two older brothers. She credits her brothers for encouraging her to participate in sports during a time pre-Title IX. Sweet played sports throughout high school, but was unable to participate in school sports as there were no women's teams, and was the valedictorian of her graduating class at Marshall High School.

Sweet attended the University of Wisconsin–Madison for her Bachelor of Arts degree, where she originally pursued a career as a math teacher. However, on a blind date her companion observed that she might explore a physical education major because she enjoyed sports, and she decided to become a physical education educator. While attending university, she partook in their Women's Recreation Association as there was no women's athletic program. The association consisted of a one-day competition where students were expected to pay for transportation and food. In order to pay for the event, Sweet and her fellow athletes ran a Christmas tree fundraiser in which they chopped and sold Christmas trees themselves.

Upon graduating from the University of Wisconsin, Sweet became a physical education teacher at Tulane University before enrolling at University of Arizona for her master's degree while continuing to teach. After receiving her second degree, she moved to San Diego unemployed, on the recommendation of a student, and accepted a teaching position at Kearny High School. Sweet stayed at the high school for one year before being hired to teach and coach at the University of California, San Diego (UCSD).

== Career ==
As UCSD was a new institution with fewer than 10,000 students, Sweet was originally hired for their physical education department in which she would also coach their men's and women's badminton. However, in her second year at the school, she was promoted to the assistant athletic director and eventually named the athletic director at the age of 27. It was the first time in the United States that a woman had been appointed to administer a joint men's and women's athletic program. She was originally unwelcomed by the other male athletic directors due to their budget cuts and she received numerous hate mail in response to the national attention she earned for her role. At the time, there was no women's faculty locker room and she was forced to use the same locker room as her students.

Following the passing of Title IX legislation, Sweet began to equalize the funding and schedules affecting men's and women's program to reach gender equity. At the time of her takeover, the men's basketball team had a $10,000 budget while the women's team has a $1,000 budget and played in a local community college league. Between 1975 and 2000, Sweet also oversaw UCSD winning 27 NCAA Division III National Championships. In 1981, Sweet was nominated to serve on the National Collegiate Athletic Association (NCAA) communications committee which eventually led to her sitting on over 20 committees through the 1980s and mid-1990s. As a result, on January 25, 1989, Sweet became the first woman to be elected secretary-treasurer of the NCAA, the second highest position within the organization. In this role, she helped negotiate the TV rights contract for the Men's Final Four Basketball Championship.

After completing her term as secretary-treasurer, Sweet became the first female president of the NCAA and the first president from a Division III school. Upon receiving the news of her promotion, a journalist from The Atlanta Journal-Constitution called it "pure tokenism" and likened it to "having a debutante as head of the National Mule Skinners Assn." However, Sweet later said that "to a lot of people, it was more startling that a Division III administrator was elected as NCAA president rather than a woman." In 1992, she received the National Association of Collegiate Women Athletic Administrators 1992 Administrator of the Year.

Following the end of her term as president, Sweet continued to serve as athletic director at UCSD until 2001 when she became the NCAA's senior vice president for championships and education services. Upon her retirement in 2006, Sweet also served as a consultant for Title IX and gender equity strategies. In April, ESPN listed her among the top 100 most influential student-athletes. In 2020, Sweet received the Lifetime Achievement Award by the San Diego Sports Association.
