= Herman Uihlein House =

Historic house in Wisconsin, United States

- U.S. National Register of Historic Places
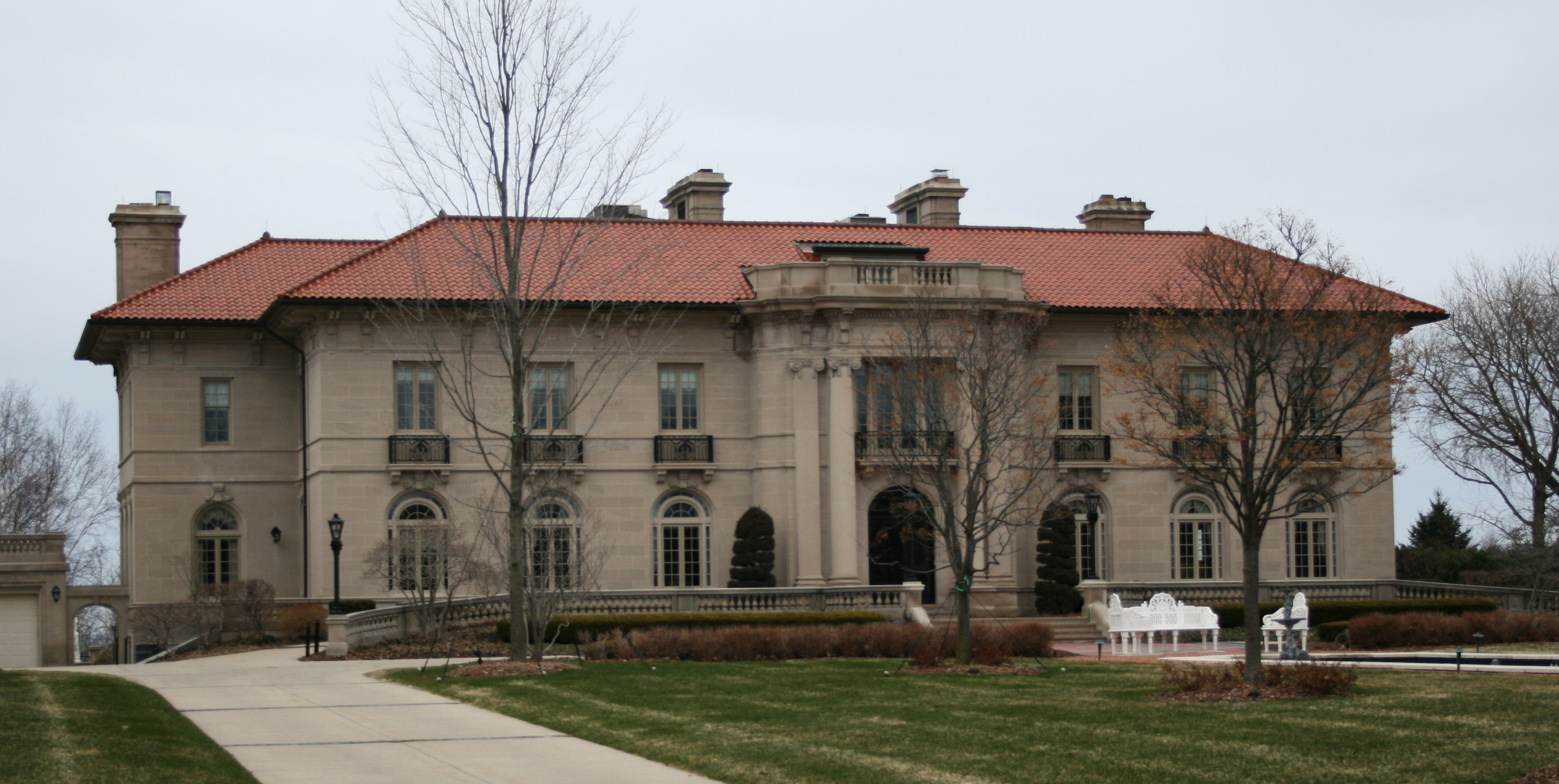

- Location within Wisconsin Location within the United States
- Interactive map showing the location for Herman Uilhein House
- Location: 5270 North Lake Drive, Whitefish Bay, WI
- Coordinates: 43°6′44.02″N 87°53′37.16″W
- Built: 1917
- Architect: Kirchoff & Rose
- Architectural style: Beaux Arts, Renaissance
- NRHP reference No.: 83004313
- Added to NRHP: December 22, 1983

The Herman Uihlein Mansion in the Milwaukee suburb of Whitefish Bay, Wisconsin, is a classical Beaux Arts-style house that was built from 1917 to 1919.

== History ==
Uihlein was the son of the president of Joseph Schlitz Brewing Company. He attended Cornell and studied law at Columbia, then from 1911 headed the Lavine Gear Company, which manufactured steering gears for trucks. In 1915 he bought a 3-acre lot on the former site of the Pabst Whitefish Bay Resort, a beer garden resort established in 1888.

Uihlein had his house built on the bluff overlooking Lake Michigan—two-stories, with limestone walls, a hip roof and classical details. It was designed by Roger Kirchoff and Thomas Leslie Rose of Milwaukee. Inside, the central hall features a sweeping grand staircase with a rail of wrought iron and an Italian-Renaissance-styled fireplace built of Amherst sandstone. The front drawing room is in French classical style, with a parquet floor and a canvas mural. The front library is in a Jacobean style, with pegged walnut floors and a Tudor-arched fireplace. The ironwork was done by Cyril Colnik of Milwaukee, and it took him three years to complete. The NRHP nomination describes the house more, and sums up: "Distinguished by an academic synthesis of Renaissance Revival and Beaux-Arts motifs, a lavishly ornamented interior, and the work of master craftsmen, the Uihlein house is an imposing suburban 'villa', palatial in both conception and execution."

The house has been listed on the National Register of Historic Places since 1983.

Throughout October and November 1992, the house was used as the primary filming location for the horror movie Aswang (1994) aka The Unearthing.

Since 2007 it belongs to the CEO, president and director of the REV Group Timothy "Tim" William Sullivan, who bought it for $5 million.
