= Edgar Uihlein =

American businessman

- Born: October 28, 1916
- Died: May 19, 2005 (aged 88); Lake Bluff, Illinois, U.S.
- Education: Hotchkiss School; Princeton University
- Occupation: Businessman
- Known for: Co-founder of General Binding Corporation
- Spouse: Lucia Ellis (m. 1941)
- Children: 5, including Richard Uihlein
- Family: Uihlein family

Edgar John Uihlein Jr. (October 28, 1916 – May 19, 2005) was an American businessman and the co-founder of General Binding Corporation.

== Early life ==
Uihlein was the son of Edgar John Uihlein Sr. (1877–1956) of Lake Bluff, Illinois, who was a vice-president and director of the Joseph Schlitz Brewing Company, and Paula Huck, daughter of Chicago beer baron L.C. Huck and granddaughter of beer baron John Huck.

He was educated at Hotchkiss School and Princeton University, where he earned a bachelor's degree in modern languages in 1940.

== Career ==
In 1940, he obtained a commission in the US Navy, rising to lieutenant commander, and becoming chief flight instructor at Glenview Naval Air Station.

In 1947, Uihlein and a Navy friend, Bill Lane, founded General Binding Corporation.

== Personal life ==
In 1941, he married Lucia Ellis, who was born in Kansas City, Missouri, and raised in Washington, D.C. She was the daughter of Rear Admiral Hayne Ellis. They had three sons, Richard, Edgar III and Stephen, and two daughters, Lucia and Sally.

Uihlein died at his home in Lake Bluff, a Chicago suburb, on May 19, 2005, aged 88.
