= Jane Bradley Pettit =

American philanthropist (1918–2001)

- Born: Jane Bradley; October 29, 1918
- Died: September 9, 2001 (aged 82); River Hills, Wisconsin, US
- Spouses: David Vogel Uihlein Sr. (m. 1945, divorced) Lloyd Pettit (m. 1969; div. 1998)
- Parent: Harry Lynde Bradley

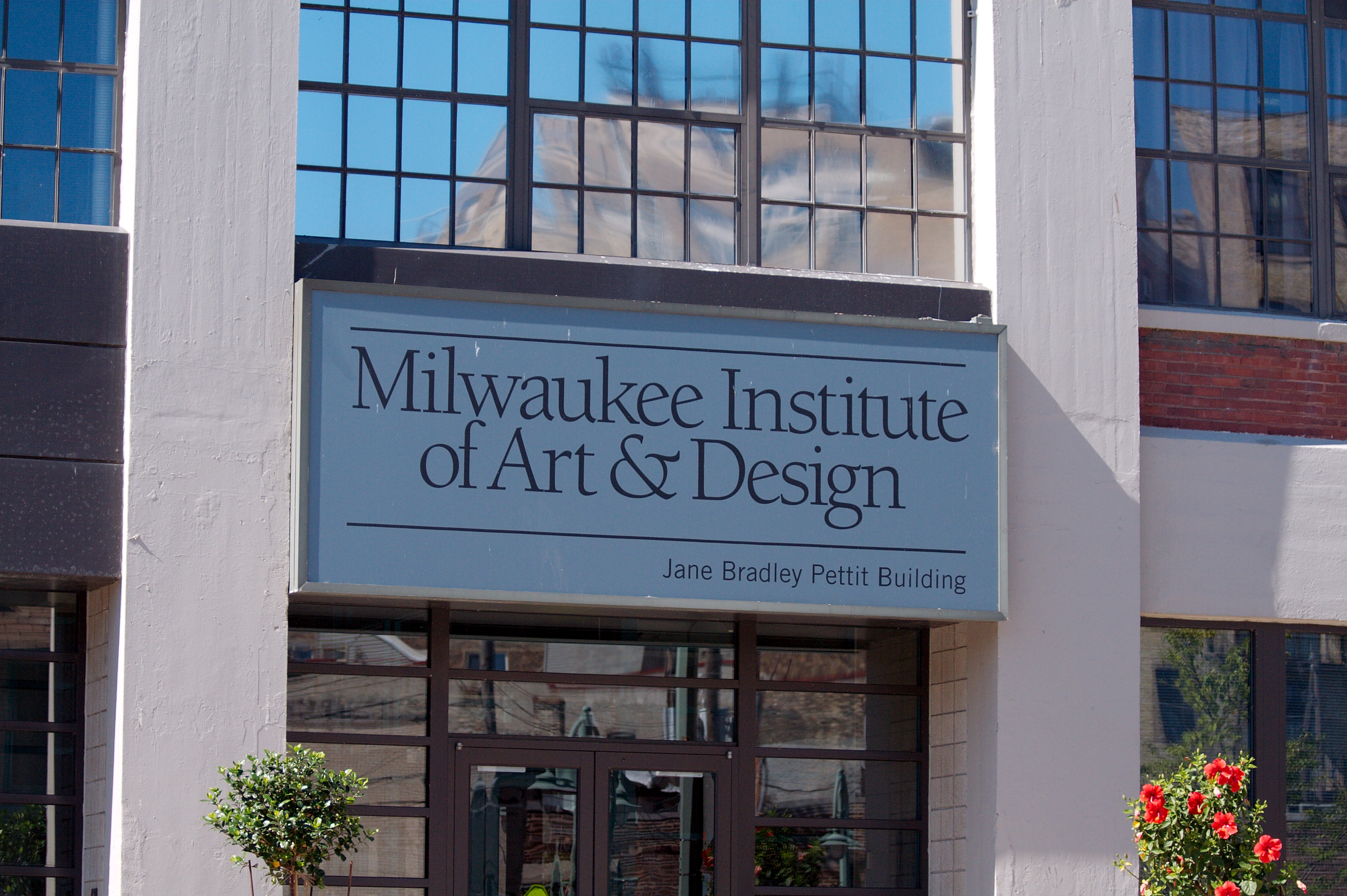
Milwaukee, Wisconsin

Jane Bradley Pettit (1918-2001) was an American philanthropist.

== Early life ==
Her father was Harry Lynde Bradley, co-founder of Allen-Bradley and the Bradley Foundation with her uncle, Lynde Bradley. She attended the Lake School for Girls, Milwaukee-Downer Seminary and Milwaukee University School. She graduated from The Principia in St. Louis, Missouri and studied drama at Finch Junior College. She was a member of the Service Club of Milwaukee. She entered society as a debutante on January 1, 1938, at the Milwaukee Country Club.

== Philanthropy ==
Over the course of her life, she donated more than $250 million to the community and through her Jane Bradley Pettit Foundation. She donated $90 million to the BMO Harris Bradley Center. Her US$20 million donation to build the Lynde & Harry Bradley School of Technology & Trade, which replaced 100-year-old Milwaukee Technical & Trade High School, was the largest single private gift ever to a public school in the United States. She also donated $9 million to the Pettit National Ice Center, an indoor skating facility with two Olympic-sized hockey rinks and a 400-meter skating oval. In 1999, she bought 14 percent of the Milwaukee Brewers. She was inducted into the Wisconsin Athletic Hall of Fame because of it. She also donated more than US$100,000 to the United Way of Great Milwaukee. The Jane Bradley Pettit Building, home to the Milwaukee Institute of Art & Design, is named for her. She founded the Jane Bradley Pettit Foundation.

In 1994, Pettit and her husband Lloyd were honored with the "Lombardi Award of Excellence" from the Vince Lombardi Cancer Foundation. The award was created to honor Vince Lombardi's legacy and is awarded annually to an individual who exemplifies his spirit.

== Personal life and death ==
In 1945, she married David Vogel Uihlein Sr., heir to the Joseph Schlitz Brewing Company. Their daughter, Lynde Bradley Uihlein, is President of the non-profit organization Brico Fund. Their son, David Vogel Uihlein, Jr., is vice-chairman of the Bradley Foundation, President of Uihlein-Wilson Architects, and chairs the David & Julia Uihlein Charitable Foundation.

She was married to Lloyd Pettit from 1969 to 1998.

She died of lung cancer on September 9, 2001. In 2002, her estate in River Hills, Wisconsin was sold to David Kohl, the son of Allen Kohl of Kohl's and the nephew of U.S. Sen. Herb Kohl (D-Wis.). She also owned homes in Land O' Lakes, Wisconsin and Naples, Florida, where she wintered.
