= August Uihlein =

German-American brewer, business executive, and horse breeder

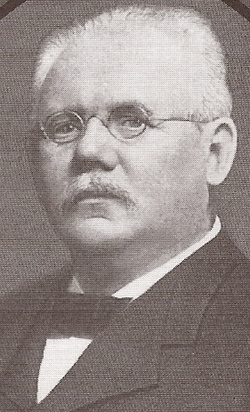
- Born: August 25, 1842; Wertheim am Main, Grand Duchy of Baden, German Confederation
- Died: October 11, 1911 (aged 69); Heligoland, Schleswig-Holstein, German Empire
- Education: German-English Academy
- Alma mater: St. Louis University
- Occupation: Businessman
- Children: 3 sons including Joseph E. Uihlein, 3 daughters
- Relatives: Uihlein family

Georg Karl August Uihlein (August 25, 1842 – October 11, 1911) was a German-American brewer, business executive, and horse breeder.

== Early life ==
August Uihlein was born Georg Karl August Ühlein in 1842 in Wertheim am Main, Grand Duchy of Baden, which is now in Germany. Among his siblings were brothers Henry Uihlein and Edward Uihlein.

His family had for years kept the Gasthaus zur Krone, an inn. In 1850, the Tauber River flooded, filling the inn's basement. Uihlein's grandfather, George Krug, offered to take his oldest grandson with him to Milwaukee, Wisconsin, in the United States, where Krug's son, August Krug, had a tavern and brewery. During the trip from Wertheim, their ship caught fire in the mid-Atlantic. Krug and Uihlein clasped a wooden box until rescued by sailors of the American bark, Devonshire.

In Milwaukee, Uihlein attended the German-English Academy. He also attended St. Louis University in St. Louis, Missouri, from 1855 to 1857.

== Career ==
Uihlein worked in the Uhrig Brewery in St. Louis from 1857 to 1867. Returning to Milwaukee in 1867, he joined what was then the Joseph Schlitz Brewing Company, formerly the Krug Brewery founded by his uncle August Krug in the 1840s. (Note: Krug's widow, Anna Maria, had married Joseph Schlitz in 1858.)

On the death of Schlitz in 1875, control of the firm passed into the hands of Uihlein and his brothers. When Mrs. Schlitz died in 1887, the Uihlein brothers acquired complete ownership of the corporation. Uihlein served as secretary and chairman of the board (1874–1911). He was also actively involved in banking, real estate, and many other Milwaukee businesses.

== Horse breeding and philanthropy ==
Interested in purebred racehorses, he kept a large stock farm at Truesdell, Wisconsin, near Kenosha. He was the owner of Harvester. Uihlein donated large sums to the German-English Academy and to the Milwaukee Public Library.

== Personal life ==
Uihlein had three sons, Erwin, Joseph, and Robert, and three daughters, Ida Pabst, Mrs W. C. Brumder, and Paula Uihlein. Ida, his eldest daughter, was married to Frederick Pabst Jr., son of brewer Frederick Pabst. He was widowed in 1910, and moved to Heligoland, Germany to rest with family members. He celebrated his 69th birthday in Switzerland.

Uihlein died in 1911 in Heligoland, Germany, whose then-ruler was Kaiser Wilhelm II. By the time of his death, he was worth an estimated US$4 million, which was split among his six children.

== See also ==
- Eberhard Anheuser
- Jacob Best
- Valentin Blatz
- Adolphus Busch
- Adolph Coors
- Gottlieb Heileman
- Frederick Miller
- Frederick Pabst
