= WisconsinEye =

- Country: Wisconsin, U.S.
- Broadcast area: Statewide on digital cable
- Headquarters: Madison, Wisconsin

Programming
- Picture format: 480i 16:9 SDTV widescreen (cable); 1080p HDTV (online)

Ownership
- Owner: WisconsinEye Public Affairs Network

History
- Launched: May 16, 2007

Links
- Website: WisEye.org

Availability

Streaming media
- Main Channel and Spectrum TV app: Air Feed

WisconsinEye is a non-profit, private public affairs cable network in the state of Wisconsin, United States. The network airs gavel-to-gavel coverage of the Wisconsin Legislature, including floor sessions of the Wisconsin State Assembly and Wisconsin State Senate, plus committee meetings and other programs of state interest such as panels, town halls, and programs about state history. The coverage is available live both on the cable network as well as through the WisconsinEye website.

The channel has partnered with Charter's Spectrum (made up of the legacy Time Warner and Charter systems within the state) in order to reach over 60 percent of the state's population, and is available on the lifeline tier for all viewers. The channel began operations in May 2007, and although the network's signal is 480i standard definition, all programming is acquired in 1080p with high-definition television (HD) cameras and equipment and presented in letterboxed format, suggesting a simple transition to an HD signal should the opportunity arise; the air feed on the network's website, along with the Spectrum TV app (access to which was added in July 2023) broadcasts in its native format. In the summer of 2019, the channel was converted to a forced widescreen mode, filling a 16:9 screen, albeit still in standard definition on cable.

Like most state public affairs networks and C-SPAN, WisconsinEye has a strict license regarding use of state legislature and other network footage in any way other than for reference purposes and disallows it from being used in political advertising, an issue which came to the forefront with a Green Bay-targeted ad by a Planned Parenthood political action committee using the network's footage in September 2013.

The channel was removed from Time Warner at the end of the original carriage agreement in early 2009 due to the network wanting payment for carriage, but eventually returned to that provider's systems in late March 2012. Time Warner and Charter merged in May 2016, making Charter's merged "Spectrum" service the dominant carrier of the network through the state.

The non-profit is financed by private donors from all sectors and political persuasions, including the Lynde & Harry Bradley Foundation, the Argosy Foundation, The Capital Times/Evjue Foundation, Phil Hendrickson, Terry and Mary Kohler, Madison Gas and Electric, Kwik Trip, Acuity Insurance, the Helen Bader Foundation, 5Nines Technology, Yahara Software, and Wisconsin billionaires Ken and Diane Hendricks, who have contributed more than US$1 million.

Between 2019–2022, WisconsinEye faced financial difficulties which grew larger due to the COVID-19 pandemic. Previously the network had been funded through large donations and loans from donors and sponsors, and saw additional funding through the CARES Act. Following the pandemic, the network faced competition for funding and skepticism from donors. The network also instituted a subscription service and furloughed several employees in an attempt to generate further revenue. After several years of further budget issues, WisconsinEye began to face the potential for a shut down, and would only be able to resume funding if it received enough in financial donations to cover operating costs for the year. shut down on December 15, 2025. During this period, president of the network Jon Henkes requested that the legislature open up some of the funds to help fund the network. In the 2025–2027 state budget, WisconsinEye had been provided $250,000, and was promised up to $9.75 million if the organization could match that in its endowment fund.

On December 15, the network shut down due to a lack of funding. After the network shutdown lawmakers issued a series of proposals relating to the network and public broadcasting. On December 18, state legislative Democrats proposed the creation of a state-run public affairs network to replace WisconsinEye. During the period of time the network was shut down, the legislature was criticized for a lack of transparency regarding legislative proceedings, and legislators and the public were banned from recording legislative proceedings.

On January 22, a bipartisan deal was made to fund WisconsinEye. The deal would move the $10 million dollars meant to act as matching funds into a trust fund, the interest from which would fund the network.
