= Itzhak Bentov =

Israeli-American engineer, inventor (1923–1979)

- יצחק בנטוב
- Born: Emerich Tobiás; August 9, 1923; Humenné, Czechoslovakia
- Died: May 25, 1979 (aged 55); Des Plaines, Illinois, United States
- Resting place: Newton Cemetery, Newton, Massachusetts, United States
- Other names: Imre Tobiás, Itzhak Emery Bentov
- Occupations: Scientist, inventor, author
- Children: Sharona Ben-Tov Muir

Itzhak "Ben" Bentov (also Ben-Tov; Hebrew: יצחק בנטוב; August 9, 1923 – May 25, 1979) was a Czechoslovakia-born American scientist, inventor, mystic and author. His many inventions, including the steerable cardiac catheter, helped pioneer the biomedical engineering industry. He was also a believer in the holographic universe theory and an early proponent of what has come to be referred to as consciousness studies and authored several books on the subject.

Bentov was killed in the crash of American Airlines Flight 191 shortly after takeoff from Chicago O'Hare Airport in 1979, which remains the worst non-terrorism-related aviation disaster to have taken place on US soil.

== Early life ==
Bentov was born in Humenné, Czechoslovakia (in present-day Slovakia), in 1923. During World War II, his parents, his younger brother and sister were killed in German Nazi concentration camps.

He narrowly escaped being sent to the camps and moved to British Palestine, first living on the Shoval kibbutz in the Negev.

Despite not having a university degree, Bentov joined the Israeli Science Corps, which David Ben-Gurion incorporated into the Israeli Defense Forces one month before Israel declared statehood in 1948. The Science Corps became a military branch known by the Hebrew acronym HEMED. Bentov designed Israel's first rocket for the War of Independence. HEMED was forced to make improvised weapons as there was a worldwide embargo on selling weapons to the Jewish state.

Bentov emigrated to the United States in 1954, and settled in Massachusetts. He became a naturalized U.S. citizen in 1962.

== Inventions ==
Bentov began with a workshop in the basement of a Catholic church in Belmont, Massachusetts, in the 1960s. In 1967, he built the steerable heart catheter and attracted the attention of businessman John Abele, with whom Bentov founded the Medi-Tech corporation in 1969.

Abele later recalled Bentov's workshop,

He had the most amazing collection of tools. He had a chemistry lab, he had an electronics lab, he had a miller so he could mill and shape steel or wood or plastic, he had an extruder so he could work with polymers. He would literally make his own polymers or at least mix different polymers in order to get what he wanted. As a result, he was kind of a renaissance person, technologically as well as intellectually.

— John Abele

In 1979, Abele and Peter Nicholas looked to grow the successful business and established Boston Scientific as a holding company to purchase Medi-Tech.

Bentov was the holder of numerous patents. In addition to the steerable cardiac catheter, his inventions included diet spaghetti, automobile brake shoes, EKG electrodes and pacemaker leads.

=== Patents ===
Filing date	Publication date	Title	Patent No.
13-12-1952	09-10-1956	Method of making laminated plastic tubing	U.S. patent 2,766,160
05-11-1958	20-02-1962	Process of making surface coats for masonry building units	U.S. patent 3,021,573
24-11-1958	28-08-1962	Scratch masking coating composition for masonry	U.S. patent 3,051,678
14-12-1961	17-11-1964	Dressing	U.S. patent 3,157,178
12-03-1962	26-01-1965	Method of encapsulating liquid particles in thermoplastic shell	U.S. patent 3,167,602
23-04-1962	28-01-1964	Power transmission	U.S. patent 3,119,283
16-05-1962	19-01-1965	Method of explosively forming fibers	U.S. patent 3,165,826
19-06-1962	03-09-1963	Means for administering medicine	U.S. patent 3,102,540
08-01-1965	11-04-1967	Pump	U.S. patent 3,313,240
18-08-1965	30-07-1968	Means and method of converting fibers into yarn	U.S. patent 3,394,540
24-03-1966	28-10-1969	Multiple conductor electrode	U.S. patent 3,474,791
12-12-1966	27-01-1970	Apparatus for making tubes of bonded flexible strips	U.S. patent 3,491,756
07-08-1968	20-09-1971	Controlled motion devices	U.S. patent 3,605,725
28-08-1969	25-05-1971	Anatomical model	U.S. patent 3,579,858
21-01-1980	23-03-1982	Dilator	U.S. patent 4,320,762

== Spirituality ==
Bentov was fascinated by consciousness, in particular how it related to physiology. In his 1977 book, Stalking the Wild Pendulum: On the Mechanics of Consciousness, he wrote that "consciousness permeates everything".

He was a very inventive person, but also a person who was not the type you would normally think would be an inventor. He was a very spiritual person, he did meditation, he was a very soft-spoken person. He was interested in how the brain worked and actually attached electrodes to his head which were connected to a function generator in which he could change the wave shape and the power and learned about how the brain interprets these different frequencies.

— John Abele

Bentov's invention was a seismographic device to record the heartbeat, in particular the aorta's reverberations. Marc Seifer described the results: "During normal breathing, the reverberations in the aorta are out of phase with the heartbeat and the system is inharmonious. However, during meditation and when the breath is held, the echo off the bifurcation of the aorta (where the aorta forks at the pelvis to go into each leg) is in resonance with the heartbeat and the system becomes synchronized, thus utilizing a minimum amount of energy. This resonant beat is approximately seven cycles per second, which corresponds not only to the alpha rhythm of the brain but also to the low-level magnetic pulsations of the Earth."

== Personal life ==
Bentov had a daughter, Sharona Ben-Tov Muir, with his first wife, whom he would divorce. Later he married soviet-born sculptor and poet Mirtala Bentov (Kharkiv, 1929 - Arizona, 2026).

== Death and legacy ==
Bentov was killed on May 25, 1979, as a passenger aboard American Airlines Flight 191 that crashed shortly after takeoff from O'Hare International Airport in Chicago. At the time of his death, he was traveling to California where he had been set to present his ideas on science and mysticism to a group of scientists from Japan. He was 55 years old. His daughter, English professor Sharona Ben-Tov Muir, wrote a memoir about her father, The Book of Telling: Tracing the Secrets of My Father's Lives in 2005. It was not until after his death that she learned about his life in the Israeli Defense Forces and that he had created Israel's first rocket. Searching for answers as to why he never discussed this part of his life, Muir traveled to Israel and researched his years there.

== Published works ==
- Stalking the Wild Pendulum: On the Mechanics of Consciousness, E. P. Dutton, 1977, ISBN 978-0-525-47458-6; Inner Traditions – Bear & Company, 1988, ISBN 0-89281-202-8
- A Brief Tour of Higher Consciousness: A Cosmic Book on the Mechanics of Creation, Inner Traditions – Bear and Company, 2000, ISBN 0-89281-814-X

- rev. ed. of A Cosmic Book on the Mechanics of Creation with Mirtala Bentov, Dutton Books, 1982, ISBN 0-525-47701-2

- Micromotions of the body as a factor in the development of the nervous system,

- published in Kundalini – psychosis or transcendence? by Lee Sannella, 1976, ISBN 0685824772
- reprinted in Kundalini, Evolution, and Enlightenment by John White, editor, 1979, ISBN 0385140959
