= Alfred Bader =

Canadian businessman, art collector, and philanthropist (1924–2018)

Alfred Bader CBE
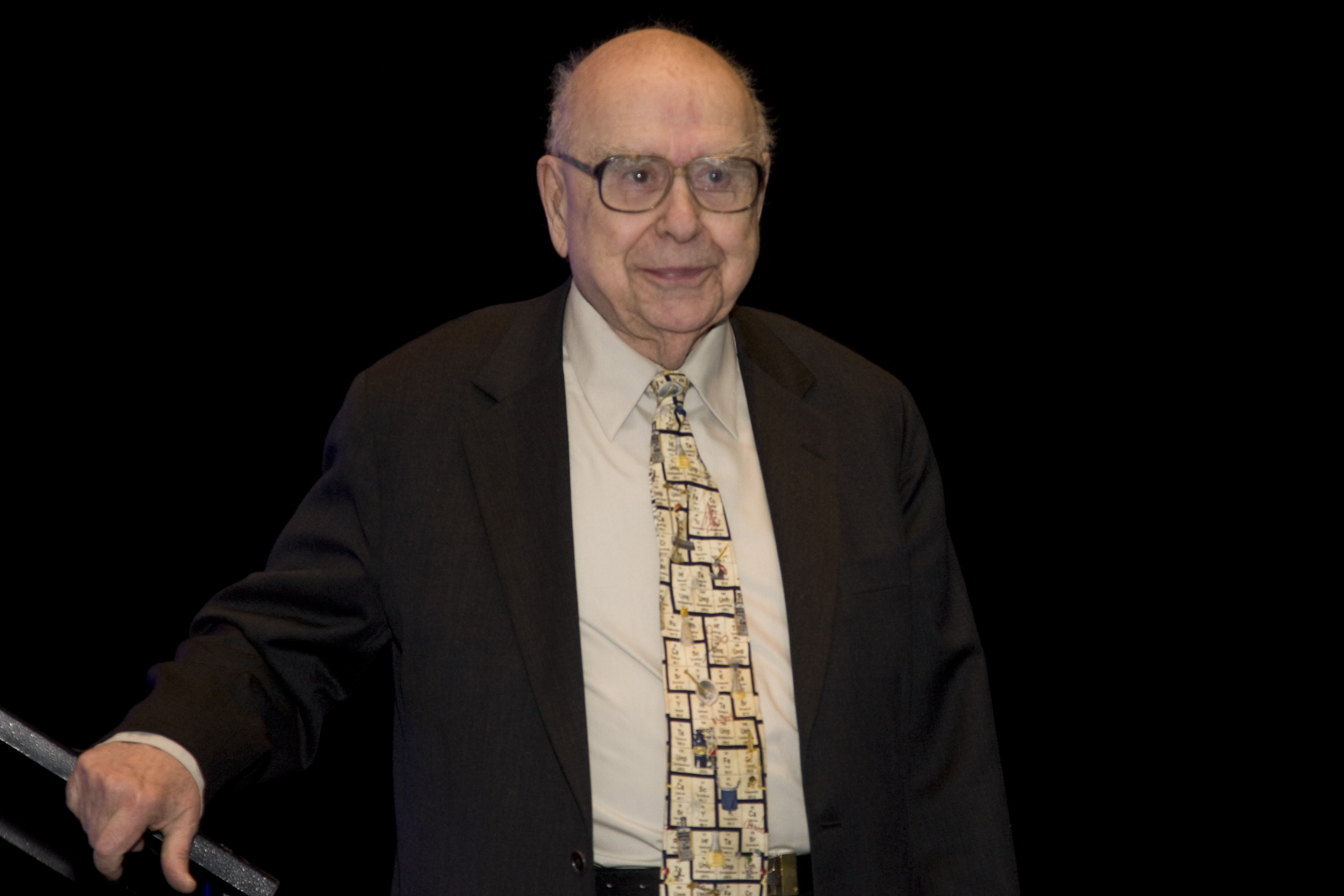
- Alfred R. Bader, recipient of the Pittcon Heritage Award, 2009
- Born: April 28, 1924; Vienna, Austria
- Died: December 23, 2018 (aged 94); Milwaukee, Wisconsin, U.S.
- Education: Queen's University, Harvard University
- Known for: Aldrich Chemical Company, Aldrichimica Acta
- Spouse: Helen Daniels Bader (m. 1952; div. 1981)
- Awards: American Institute of Chemists Gold Medal (1997), Pittcon Heritage Award (2009)
- Scientific career
- Fields: Chemistry
- Doctoral advisor: Louis Fieser

Alfred Robert Bader CBE (April 28, 1924 – December 23, 2018) was a Canadian chemist, businessman, philanthropist, and collector of fine art. He was considered by the Chemical & Engineering News poll of 1998 to be one of the "Top 75 Distinguished Contributors to the Chemical Enterprise" during C&EN's 75-year history.

== Early years ==
Alfred Bader was born on April 28, 1924, in Vienna, Austria. His father, Alfred Bader, was of Czech Jewish descent. His grandfather, Moriz Bader, had been a civil engineer, who worked on the Suez Canal and was appointed Knight of the Order of Franz Joseph by Emperor Franz Joseph for his service as Austrian consul at Ismaïlia. His mother, Elizabeth Countess Serényi, came from an aristocratic Catholic Hungarian family. In spite of adamant opposition from Serényi's family, the couple had married in London and settled in Vienna. Alfred was born only two weeks before his father's death. He was adopted by his father's sister, Gisela Reich, and raised as a Jew. His older sister, Marion, remained with Countess Serényi and was raised as a Catholic.

In June 1938, Bader was forced out of school because Jews were forbidden to attend beyond the age 14. On December 10, 1938, he was sent from Austria to England as part of the Kindertransport to escape Nazi persecution. His adoptive mother remained in Austria, and died in 1942 in Theresienstadt.

While in England, Bader attended the East Hove Senior School for Boys, and Brighton Technical College. In 1940 he was sent to a Canadian internment camp for European refugees (which Bader described as spartan but a good influence on his academic and social education). While in the camp, Bader passed his junior and senior matriculation, taking exams from McGill University. A Montreal sponsor, Martin Wolff, welcomed him into a Canadian Jewish family in late 1941 and encouraged him to study further.

== Education ==
After being rejected by McGill, which had a Jewish "quota" and by the University of Toronto, where the chemistry department was doing sensitive war work, Bader was accepted by Queen's University, in Kingston, Ontario. He received his B.Sc. in Engineering Chemistry in 1945, followed by a B.A. in history in 1946. During the summers, he worked for the Murphy Paint Company in Montreal, formulating paints, lacquers and varnishes to order. He completed his M.S. in chemistry in 1947, doing considerable work on the oxidation of linoleic acids and isomeric tetrahydroxystearic acids. His work with Arthur F. McKay, a "superb experimentalist" who supervised Bader's laboratory work in experimental chemistry, convinced Bader to focus on the field of synthetic organic chemistry.

Bader went on to study at Harvard University, with the support of the Abbott fellowship. He received an M.A. in chemistry in 1949 and a Ph.D. in Organic Chemistry in 1950. At Harvard, he studied with famed organic chemist Louis Fieser, working on the rearrangement of quinones and the development of intermediates in the Hooker oxidation process.

- Engineering Chemistry BS, Queen's University (1945)
- History BA, Queen's University (1946)
- Chemistry MSc, Queen's University (1947)
- Chemistry MA, Harvard University (1949)
- Chemistry PhD, Harvard University (1950)

== Business ==
While working for the Murphy Paint Company in Montreal, Bader was offered financial support to do graduate work, on the condition that he return to work at the company. By the time he finished his Ph.D. at Harvard, Murphy Paint had been acquired by Pittsburgh Plate Glass Co. In January 1950, Bader began work as a research chemist at Pittsburgh Plate Glass. His appointment to the Milwaukee, Wisconsin research facilities broke an unwritten rule against the hiring of Jews and African Americans. While at PPG Bader did significant work in noncatalytic transesterification and in the development of monomers, including systematic studies of alkenylphenols, unsaturated phenols, and phenolic resins. This work led to a number of patents. The patent for Bader's method of creating diphenolic acid was later sold by PPG to Johnson Wax for $1M. Bader remained with PPG until 1954, when the company planned a move to Pittsburgh.

During this time, Bader became increasingly aware of the need for a small reliable company dedicated to providing quality research chemicals. At that time Kodak was their only supplier, and the large company seemed to show insufficient consideration for small and independent researchers. Bader himself had experienced this as a graduate student, when he ordered one of the compounds he needed from the Kodak catalog. He eventually had to make it himself due to its infrequent availability.

In 1951, while still working at PPG, Bader co-founded the Aldrich Chemical Company with Jack Eisendrath, a lawyer. Jack Eisendrath was the first company president. Although Bader held the title of Chief Chemist, most chemicals were not produced in-house. Bader bought interesting compounds from a variety of sources in the United States and Europe and listed them in his catalog. The company initially operated out of a garage where the chemicals were stored and packaged for mailing. The first product sent out by Aldrich was Methylnitronitrosoguanidine, which Bader had learned to produce at Queen's. By 1954 Bader and his first wife, Helen "Danny" Daniels, bought Eisendrath out of Aldrich, becoming "sole and equal owners of the company." Alfred Bader became the company president, leaving PPG.

Reliable chemicals were essential for research chemists of all kinds. They saved time and work in preparation, and the availability of standardized key reagents and starting materials contributed to the reproducibility of experimental results. The Aldrich Chemical Company catalog eventually grew to contain nearly 50,000 substances, described by the Chemical Heritage Foundation as "a huge library of rare chemicals" in addition to thousands of those most commonly used. The company's "Big Red" annual catalog was often used as a reference work because of the extensive physical data and structural information that it contained.

As the catalog grew, so did the company. In 1962 in a 50:50 venture between Aldrich Chemicals and Metal Hydrides Inc., Alfred Bader founded Alfa Inorganics, intending to complement Aldrich's organic chemicals with inorganic research chemicals. This joint venture was terminated in 1967. Other joint ventures have been formed as well. A separate corporation, the Alfred Bader Chemical Corp., was sold to Aldrich on December 20, 1965. A British subsidiary, originally known as Ralph N. Emanuel, Ltd., was co-owned by the Emanuel and Bader families from 1959 to 1969, was gradually taken over by Aldrich, and officially renamed Aldrich Chemical Co. Ltd. in 1973. Aldrich also obtained a controlling interest in Heidenheimer Chemisches Laboratorium (HCL) in Heidenheim, Germany by 1971. In 1975 the Aldrich Chemical Company merged with Sigma Chemical Corporation to become the Sigma-Aldrich Corporation. Aldrich was a leading supplier of organic research chemicals; Sigma a leading supplier of research biochemicals. Together they became the 80th largest chemical company in the United States. As of 1987, 35% of the chemicals sold by Aldrich were produced in-house. Bader served as president of the combined company from 1975 to 1980 and from 1980 to 1991 as chairman. In 1991 he retired as chairman, and was named chairman emeritus.

In an unexpected corporation upheaval, Bader was voted off the board of the company in 1992, losing the title of chairman emeritus, but remaining one of the largest holders of the company's stock. Bader later stated that while it was a staggering blow at the time, the change gave him more time to deal in art works and continue his philanthropy, making him happier. The company later reinstated Bader in the role of "chemist collector," in which he provided the company journal, Aldrichimica Acta, with paintings for its covers.

== Art collector ==
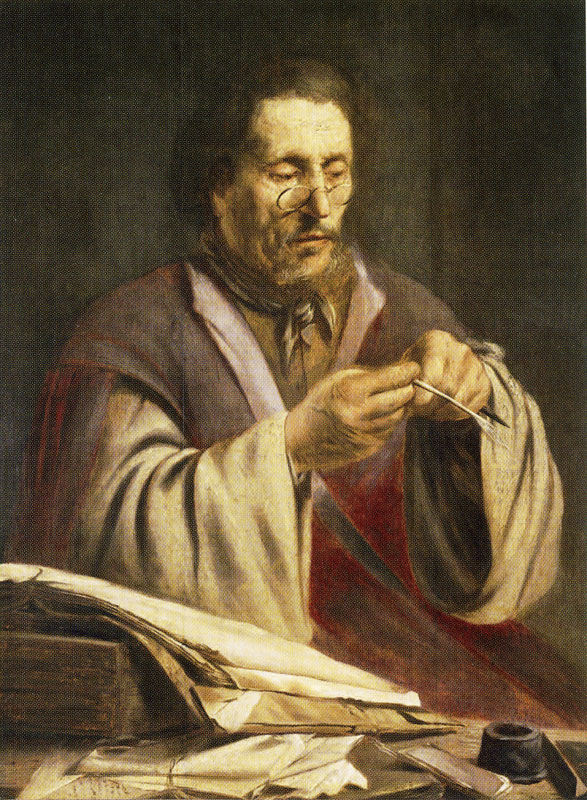
The Quill Cutter, Paulus Lesire, ca.1628-9

Bader stated, "I am an inveterate collector. It may be a sickness, and it began with stamps at eight, drawings at 10, paintings at 20, and rare chemicals at 30." He collected stamps as a youth when his finances permitted. He purchased his first oil painting in the Canadian internment camp: his portrait, painted by a fellow inmate, for a fee of one Canadian dollar.

A lifelong collector, Bader has devoted himself to the study of art history and collection of many fine paintings. In 1961, he and Marvin Klitsner established Alfred Bader Fine Arts gallery in Milwaukee. Beginning with its first issue in 1968, Bader contributed numerous articles on art subjects to the Aldrich Chemical Company's journal, Aldrichimica Acta. In addition, full-color copies of Dutch masters from Bader's collection were used for the covers of many of the journal's issues. Artworks from his collection were also featured on the Aldrich Handbook, beginning with the Quill Cutter by Paulus de Lesire in the 1967–68 edition of the catalog.

In 1995 Bader published his autobiography, Adventures of a Chemist Collector, which details his experiences from Nazi-era refugee, to chemist magnate, to fine arts connoisseur. In 2008 he published his second autobiography, Chemistry & Art - Further Adventures of a Chemist Collector.

Alfred Bader died at home in Milwaukee on December 23, 2018.

== Philanthropist ==
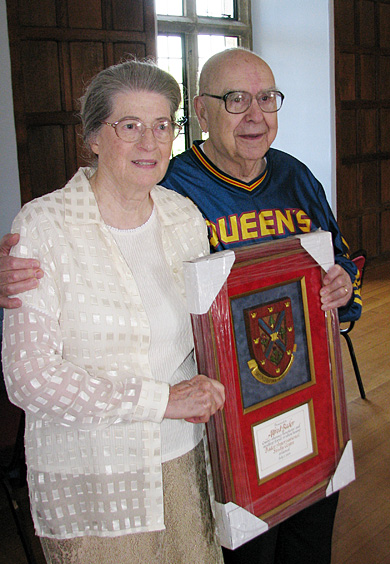
Drs. Alfred and Isabel Bader at Queen's University's Bader College, 2009

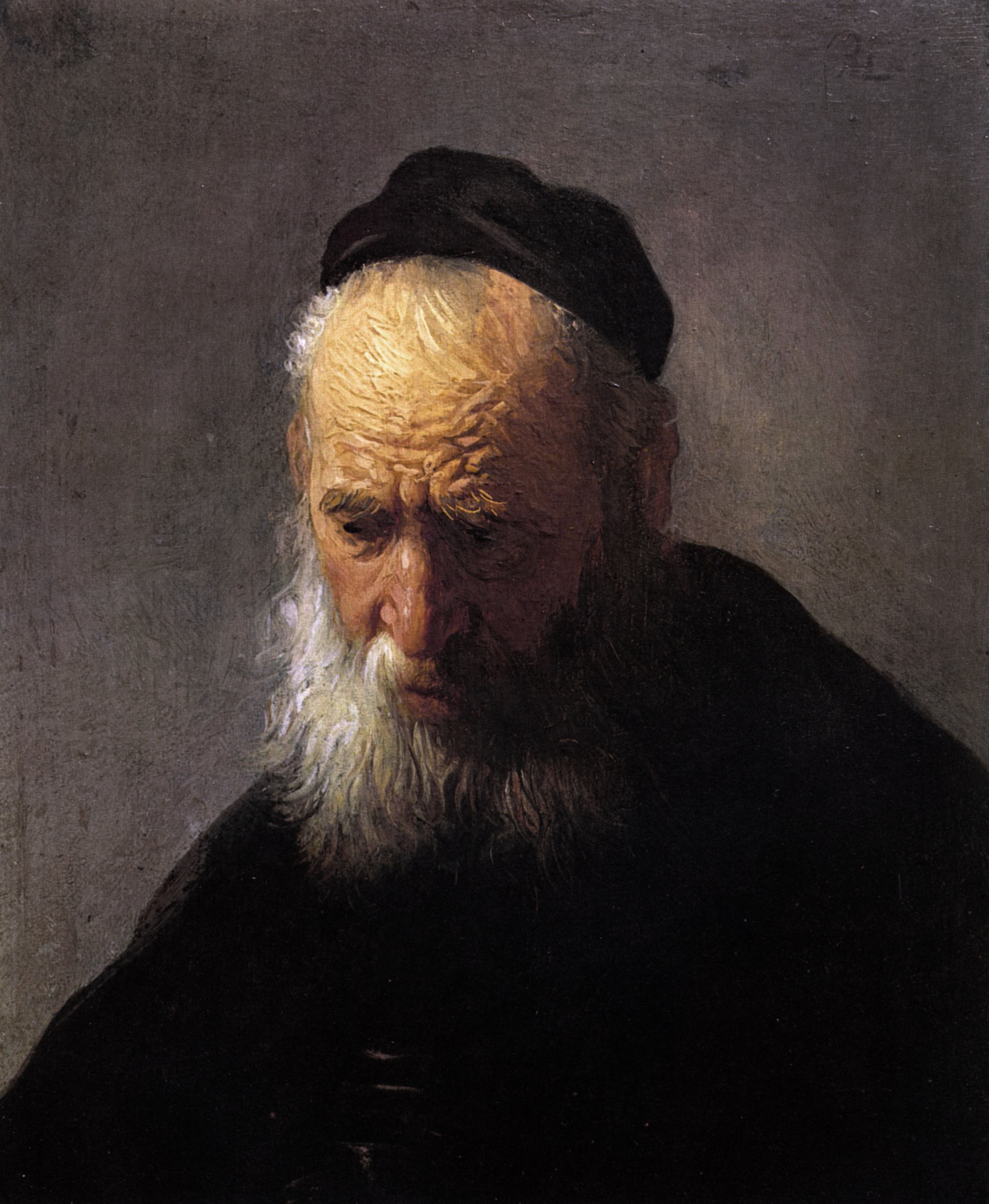
Head of an Old Man in a Cap, by Rembrandt, Agnes Etherington Art Centre

Bader has given various charitable donations to Queen's University, Canada, both financial and in-kind. He purchased the 15th century Herstmonceux Castle in East Sussex, England, and donated it to Queen's University, which opened Bader College there in 1994. The residence at the college at Herstmonceux Castle is named "Bader Hall" in recognition.

Bader and his second wife, Isabel, have also established a number of fellowships, including the Alfred Bader Graduate Fellowship, the Alfred Bader Graduate Fellowship in Art, The Alfred Bader Graduate Fellowship in the Humanities, and the Alfred and Isabel Bader Postdoctoral Fellowship in Jewish History. Queen's also hosts three Bader Chairs: in Organic Chemistry, in Southern Baroque Art, and in Northern Baroque Art. In honour of his numerous contributions, in 2004 Queen's renamed a campus road from "Queen's Crescent" to "Bader Lane".

The Baders are long-time supporters of the Agnes Etherington Art Centre at Queen's in Kingston, Ontario. Upon the invitation of curator Frances Smith in 1967, Bader first donated a painting to Queen's, a Salvator Mundi. In 2014, Bader and his second wife, Isabel, donated 68 paintings from their personal collection of Dutch and Flemish Baroque art to the Agnes Etherington Art Centre, bringing the number of paintings they have donated to the centre to over 200. Highlights of the collection include three paintings by Rembrandt van Rijn, Head of an Old Man in a Cap, Head of a Man in a Turban, and Portrait of a Man with Arms Akimbo; and paintings by Willem Drost, Jan Lievens, Aert de Gelder, and Jacobus Leveck. The collection has been the basis of a number of exhibitions and publications.

The Baders also contributed a "transformational gift" towards the creation of the Isabel Bader Centre for the Performing Arts, which opened in 2014. The centre contains a music performance hall, a studio theatre, a small cinema, an art and media lab, a large rehearsal hall and many classrooms, and brings together the Department of Film and Media, the School of Music, the Department of Drama, and the Bachelor of Fine Art Program at Queen's. It provides a performance venue for both the university and the surrounding city.

At Victoria University, Toronto, alma mater of Isabel Bader, the Baders funded construction of a performing arts theatre, the Isabel Bader Theatre.

The Baders have also supported Project SEED, an American Chemical Society initiative that gives scholarships to economically disadvantaged high school students and enables them to conduct hands-on research.

Since 2001, the Baders supported the Malta Conferences Foundation which uses science as a bridge to peace in the Middle East.

Since 1986, the Baders have funded the giving of the Alfred Bader Award in Bioinorganic or Bioorganic Chemistry by the American Chemical Society, "to recognize outstanding contributions to bioorganic or bioinorganic chemistry". Since 1989, the Baders have funded the Bader Award from the Royal Society of Chemistry given "to recognise eminence in organic chemistry". Since 2013, the Alfred Bader Award has been given by the Canadian Society for Chemistry to a scientist working in Canada for "excellence in research in organic chemistry".

As of 2011, the Baders had donated $1.6 million towards the construction of the proposed Kenwood Interdisciplinary Research Complex (KIRC) at the University of Wisconsin–Milwaukee (UWM).

== Awards and honours ==
Awards and honours received by Alfred Bader include but are not limited to the following:

=== Honorary degrees ===
- DSc from University of Wisconsin–Milwaukee (1980)
- DSc from Purdue University (1984)
- DSc from University of Wisconsin–Madison (1984)
- LL.D. from Queen's University (1986)
- DUniv from University of Sussex (1989)
- DSc from Northwestern University (1990)
- DSc from University of Edinburgh (1998)
- DSc from Glasgow University (1999)
- DSc from Masaryk University (2000)

=== Memberships ===
- Wisconsin Academy of Sciences, Arts & Letters - Fellow (1986)
- Royal Society of Chemistry - Honorary Fellow (1990)
- Chemical Institute of Canada - Honorary Fellow (1996)
- Austrian Chemical Society - Honorary Membership (2002)
- Royal Society of Arts in London, England - Fellow

=== Medals and awards ===
- American Chemical Society, Milwaukee Section - Award (1971)
- Winthrop-Sears Medal (1980)
- Czech Academy of Sciences - J.E. Purkyne Medal (1994)
- American Chemical Society - Charles Lathrop Parsons Award (1995)
- University of Vienna - Honorary Citizen (1995)
- Boron USA Award (1997)
- American Institute of Chemists Gold Medal (1997)
- Pittcon Heritage Award (2009)
- Commander of the Order of the British Empire

== Personal ==
Bader's marriages are described in his autobiographical books. His romance in England with Isabel Overton (1926–2022), the daughter of a deeply religious Protestant family in Northern Ontario and a graduate of Victoria University in Toronto, began with a shipboard meeting in 1949 and continued in a rapid courtship and some 400 love letters. Isabel broke off the relationship because of religious concerns and settled in Bexhill-on-Sea in Sussex, England but did not become romantically involved with anyone else. Her love letters to Alfred Bader have been published as A Canadian in Love, 2000.

Alfred went on to meet and marry his first wife Helen Ann "Danny" Daniels, in the United States. Similar in many ways to Isabel, including a Protestant religious upbringing, Danny converted to Judaism before Bader proposed to her. Married in July 1952, they had two sons, David (born 1958) and Daniel (born 1961). Danny worked at Aldrich Chemicals, and owned shares in the company.

Nearly three decades later Alfred re-connected with Isabel, which led to the breakdown of his marriage with Danny; Danny requested a divorce in 1981 and died six years later. Alfred subsequently married Isabel and the two remained happily married until his death. Alfred and Danny's two sons, David and Daniel, now serve as half-owners of Alfred Bader Fine Arts. (Descendants of Bader's onetime partner in that gallery, Marvin Klitsner, now own the other half.) They also serve as president and vice-president of Bader Philanthropies, a foundation originally formed in 1992, now honouring Helen Daniels Bader and Isabel and Alfred Bader.

== Resources ==
- Adventures of a Chemist Collector, by Alfred Bader. Weidenfeld and Nicolson, 1995 ISBN 0-297-83461-4
- Further Adventures of a Chemist Collector, by Alfred Bader. Weidenfeld and Nicolson, 2008 ISBN 978-0-297-85512-5
- A Canadian in love, letters from Isabel Overton to Alfred Bader, edited and with an introduction by Roseann Runte. Toronto : Victoria University, 2000.
- Center for Oral History. "Alfred R. Bader". Science History Institute.
- Thackray, Arnold (July 31, 1987). Alfred R. Bader, Transcript of an Interview Conducted by Arnold Thackray in Milwaukee, Wisconsin on 31 July 1987 (PDF). Philadelphia, PA: The Beckman Center for the History of Chemistry. Archived from the original (PDF) on February 21, 2019.
- The Bader Family papers, Victoria University Library, Toronto, Ontario
- The Aldrich Chemical Company collection, 1945-2001 (bulk 1951-1980), Science History Institute, Philadelphia, PA
