= Thomas Park Clement =

American businessman (b. 1951)

- Born: c.1951 South Korea
- Spouse: Wonsook Kim
- Children: 2

Thomas Park Clement (born c.1951) is an American CEO, president and founder of Mectra Laboratories, Inc., a biotechnology company that manufactures laparoscopic disposable instruments.

== Life and career ==
Clement was born in South Korea in the middle of the Korean War to a Korean mother and an American soldier father. During the first four or five years of his life, he was in the care of his birth mother. However, he was left alone in a street corner the busy streets of Seoul by his mother after she kissed him goodbye, buttoned his coat and told him not to look back as she left. He eventually looked back and found himself alone. Clement roamed the streets with a group of children for a time until he was found by a Methodist missionary and taken to an orphanage.

In 1958, when Clement was six years old, he was adopted by Richard and June Clement and taken to the U.S. He grew up in North Carolina and later on in Massachusetts with his adoptive parents and siblings. Around age 20, while he was in college, he lost his adoptive mother to cancer. His father quit his job and moved to Indiana to open up stores. Clement stopped going to college in Massachusetts and transferred to Purdue University in Indiana. Eventually, he got tired of his Electrical Engineering program and switched to Psychology instead and transferred to Indiana University. He finished his B.A. and graduated, but he could not find a job that paid well. So, he started working as a carpenter building houses.

Over time, he got tired of his job and returned to Purdue University to finish his studies in Electronical Engineering. Then, he obtained a job as communications equipment manufacturer at Wavetec, Inc., and then at Vantec, Inc. (now Boston Scientific) as an inventor and product developer. Afterwards, he quit his job and founded Mectra Laboratories, Inc. in 1988. Over the years, he developed around 42 inventions and holds U.S. patents of them.

Around his 40s, he started getting involved with the Korean Americans Adoptees' community and their families, leading to him writing a book in 1998 about his experiences and later on a memoir in 2012. He has donated around $1 million to cover costs for DNA testing for hundreds of Korean adoptees. He has also supported humanitarian missions to North Korea and Africa, as well as led them.

He is married to Korean artist Wonsook Kim, and is the father of two children.
