= Cameron McIntyre (neuroscientist) =

American scientist

- Occupations: Biomedical engineer, neuroscientist, professor, entrepreneur

Cameron McIntyre is an American biomedical engineer, neuroscientist, professor and entrepreneur known for his research in deep brain stimulation (DBS) and its applications in the treatment of neurological disorders. He currently serves as a faculty member in the Department of Biomedical Engineering at Duke University. McIntyre's work on holographic visualization of DBS surgeries has been covered by news outlets. In 2020, he was recipient of the Senator Jacob Javits Award of the National Institutes of Neurological Disorders and Stroke.

== Career ==
McIntyre has published on the biophysical mechanisms of DBS and has contributed significantly to computational models that predict DBS effects on the brain.

== Research ==
McIntyre holds patents that describe innovations in DBS modeling and invented the GUIDE DBS clinical programming system which was commercialized by the spin-off company Intelect Medical Inc., which was acquired by Boston Scientific in 2011 and now has FDA and CE Mark approval.

== Awards and honors ==
McIntyre has been inducted (as a Fellow) into the American Institute for Medical and Biological Engineering.

== Selected publications ==
- Petersen MV, Mlakar J, Haber SN, Parent M, Smith Y, Strick PL, Griswold MA, McIntyre CC. Holographic Reconstruction of Axonal Pathways in the Human Brain. Neuron. Published online November 8, 2019:1-13.
- McIntyre CC, Grill WM. Extracellular Stimulation of Central Neurons: Influence of Stimulus Waveform and Frequency on Neuronal Output. J Neurophysiol. 2002;88(4):1592-1604.
