= Donald Baim =

American cardiologist and researcher

Donald S. Baim
- Born: September 26, 1949; New York City
- Died: November 6, 2009 (aged 60); Massachusetts
- Occupations: Researcher and clinician
- Spouse: Caryn Paris (m. 1997)
- Children: 2 sons & 2 stepdaughters

Donald S. Baim (September 26, 1949 – November 6, 2009) was a researcher and clinician in the field of interventional cardiology. Baim's primary research focused on coronary blood flow, catheter intervention in heart disease, and congestive heart failure. His work helped to shift the use of catheters from a purely diagnostic tool to a therapeutic tool. After receiving a medical degree from Yale and initial medical training, residency and a fellowship at Stanford University Medical Center, Baim spent the bulk of his career at Beth Israel Hospital and at the Brigham and Women's Hospital in Boston. In 1993, Baim founded the Beth Israel Hospital's Cardiovascular Data Analysis Center (CDAC) -- later to be named Harvard Clinical Research Institute (HCRI). Baim died of cancer in November 2009. In October 2016, HCRI changed its name to the Baim Institute for Clinical Research.

== Education ==
Baim earned a bachelor's degree in physics from the University of Chicago in 1971 and a medical degree from Yale University in 1975. In 1995, he was awarded an honorary master's degree from Harvard University.

== Academic and research career ==
Baim trained in internal medicine and cardiology in the early days of balloon angioplasty under John Simpson at Stanford University Medical Center, where he was an intern in medicine from 1975 to 1976. At Stanford, he served as a resident in medicine from 1976 to 1978 and a fellow in cardiology from 1978 to 1980. From 1980 to 1981, he was an attending physician and a physician specialist in cardiology at Stanford.

He became board certified in internal medicine in 1979, and in 1981, he received board certification in cardiovascular disease.

Baim joined the Harvard Medical School faculty in 1981 as instructor in medicine. He served as assistant professor of medicine at Harvard Medical School from 1982 to 1988 and associate professor of medicine from 1988 to 1994. In 1994, he became a full professor of medicine at Harvard Medical School.

In addition to his academic positions at Harvard Medical School, Baim held various clinical positions during the 1980s and 1990s at Beth Israel Hospital (BI, now Beth Israel Deaconess Medical Center) in Boston. In 1981, he established BI's interventional cardiology program. Under his leadership, the program performed research in the refinement, critical evaluation and optimal application of stents, atherectomy, clot removal and distal embolic protection.

While at BI, he also served as acting director of the coronary care unit (1981-1983), assistant physician (1982-1989), associate director of the cardiac catheterization laboratory (1982-1984), director of invasive cardiology (1984-1992), and chief of the interventional cardiology section (1992-1996).

In 1993, Baim co-founded the Cardiovascular Data Analysis Center (CDAC) at Beth Israel Hospital. In order to reflect its work with Harvard teaching hospitals, the organization became known as the Harvard Clinical Research Institute (HCRI) in 2000 and became an independent, non-profit academic research organization (ARO). In October 2016, HCRI was renamed in honor of Baim, becoming the Baim Institute for Clinical Research. As of October 2016, the Baim Institute has worked on more than 450 clinical trials in North America, Europe and Asia.

In 2000, Baim joined Brigham and Women's Hospital as a senior physician. During his tenure there, he also served as director of the Center for Integration of Medicine and Innovative Technology, a Boston-wide consortium of medical professionals involved in developing medical devices.

== Major research interests ==
Baim's research focused on three primary areas: 1. Coronary blood flow: physiology of large and small vessel coronary regulation and new techniques for measuring coronary blood flow and myocardial metabolism.

2. Catheter intervention in heart disease: percutaneous transluminal coronary angioplasty (PTCA, now commonly referred to as percutaneous coronary intervention, or PCI), balloon valvuloplasty and novel therapies, coronary atherectomy and thrombectomy, intra-coronary stents, distal embolic protection devices, and evaluation of new devices for coronary intervention.

3. Congestive heart failure: utility of endomyocardial biopsy and new inotropic agents.

== Interventional cardiology ==
Mainstays of coronary intervention include balloon angioplasty and coronary stenting. Additional techniques include atherectomy (removal of plaque from lesions), thrombectomy (removal of clots from vessels) and embolic protection (capture and removal of embolic debris).

Baim wrote several chapters for and served as lead editor of the main textbook in the field of interventional cardiology, Grossman's Cardiac Catheterization, Angiography and Intervention, 7th Edition, published in 2006, after serving as co-editor for editions 4–6. This was the first edition of the 30+ year-old text to feature extensively revised content in interventional techniques and devices, including material on pediatric and adult congenital heart disease, coronary atherectomy, thrombectomy, distal protection devices, stents and percutaneous valve therapies.

Baim served as a member of the Interventional Cardiology Test Committee of the American Board of Internal Medicine.

== Career milestones ==
Baim served as chief medical and scientific officer for Boston Scientific in Natick, Mass., from 2006 until his death in 2009. During his tenure at Boston Scientific, he supported the use of drug-eluting stents at a time when the 2006 European Congress of Cardiology called their safety into question. Baim presented data that the devices did not result in an increase in heart attack or death, a position supported by later studies.

Baim was one of six Boston Scientific employees responsible for inventing a patented bifurcation stent delivery system and methods in 2008.

In 2011, Boston Scientific established a $1.7 million endowment to fund the Donald S. Baim scholarship fund for Yale School of Medicine.

In addition to his position at Boston Scientific, Baim was a founder of, or key contributor to, more than 20 medical device start-up companies.

== Personal life ==
Baim was born in New York City on September 26, 1949, and grew up in Miami Beach, Florida. He married Caryn Paris in 1997. He had two sons, Adam and Christopher, as well as two step-daughters, Samantha and Jenifer. In his personal time, he enjoyed travel, playing the guitar and cooking for his family.

Baim had multiple sclerosis starting at the age of 40. Less than three months after he was diagnosed with adrenal cancer, Donald Baim died on November 6, 2009, at the age of 60. He is buried in Sharon Memorial Park in Sharon, Mass.

== Honors and Recognitions ==
In 1983, Baim was named a fellow of the American College of Cardiology, and in 1984, he was named a fellow of the Society for Cardiac Angiography and Intervention.

Baim served on the editorial boards of several medical journals, including the Journal of the American College of Cardiology, Circulation, and Catheterization and Cardiovascular Intervention. He served as co-editor-in-chief of Cardiology and section editor for Interventional Cardiology. He served as an interventional cardiology exam consultant for the American Board of Internal Medicine.

In October 2000, Baim received a Career Achievement Award at the Trans Cardiovascular Therapeutics meeting.
