= Bradley Foundation =

American private charitable foundation

Coordinates: 43°02′50.7″N 87°54′38.2″W

Lynde and Harry Bradley Foundation
- Formation: 1942 (84 years ago)
- Type: Nonprofit
- Tax ID no.: 39-6037928
- Legal status: 501(c)(3)
- Purpose: Private charitable foundation
- Headquarters: Ste 300; 1400 N Water St; Milwaukee, WI 53202-2506; United States
- President: Richard William Graber
- Revenue: $61 million (2024)
- Expenses: $68.9 million (2024)
- Website: www.bradleyfdn.org

The Lynde and Harry Bradley Foundation, commonly known as the Bradley Foundation, is an American charitable foundation based in Milwaukee, Wisconsin, that has been one of the most influential funders of the conservative movement. The foundation had nearly $1 billion in assets as of 2023. It has given $1.3 billion in grants since 1985.

The foundation funds a variety of conservative public policy groups along with cultural institutions and Milwaukee nonprofit organizations. It reports that approximately 70% of the foundation's giving is directed to national groups while 30% is Wisconsin-based. It awards the Bradley Prize.

== History ==
The foundation was established in 1942, shortly after the death of Lynde Bradley, to further the philosophy of the Bradley brothers. The Bradley brothers had helped found the Allen-Bradley Company, a major electrical controls manufacturer. The foundation's credo is "The good society is a free society."

In 1965, after the death of Harry Lynde Bradley, Lynde's brother, the foundation expanded and began to concentrate on public policy. The 1985 acquisition of the Allen-Bradley Company by Rockwell International Corporation resulted in a portion of the proceeds going to expand the foundation, swelling its assets from $14 million to over $290 million. In 1986, the foundation gave away $23 million, more than it had in the previous four decades.

The Bradley Foundation's former president, Michael S. Joyce, helped to create the Philanthropy Roundtable.

In 2011, the Milwaukee Journal Sentinel wrote that "The Bradley Foundation acts like a venture capital fund for conservative ideas."

== Funding areas ==
The foundation describes itself as supporting limited government. The New York Times described the Bradley Foundation as "a leading source of ideas and financing for American conservatives." A 2013 report from the Center for Public Integrity found that the Bradley Foundation was a contributor to Donors Trust, a donor advised fund which is not required to disclose the identity of its donors.

In a 2018 interview, the foundation's CEO, Richard Graber, described its four major areas of funding as "constitutional order", education (in particular school choice), civil society, and arts and culture. In that interview, Graber said that the foundation would deemphasize some areas in which it had previously made grants, including national security and foreign policy. Between 2008 and 2011, Bradley contributed to the David Horowitz Freedom Center ($4.2 million), the Center for Security Policy ($815,000) and the Middle East Forum ($305,000).

The Bradley Foundation is a major funder of state-level initiatives opposing public sector unions, particularly in Wisconsin. The foundation has made grants to the American Legislative Exchange Council (ALEC), The associated Bradley Impact Fund in 2020 gave $6.5 million, its largest donation that year, to Project Veritas.

== Bradley Prize ==
The Bradley Prize is a grant to "formally recognize individuals of extraordinary talent and dedication who have made contributions of excellence in areas consistent with The Lynde and Harry Bradley Foundation's mission." As many as four prizes of $300,000 each are awarded annually. Winners have included Fouad Ajami (2006), John Bolton (2007), Martin Feldstein (2007), Victor Davis Hanson (2008), Leonard Leo (2009), William Kristol (2009), Paul A. Gigot (2010), Jeb Bush (2011), Edwin Meese III (2012), Roger Ailes (2013), Paul Clement (2013), Mitch Daniels (2013), Yuval Levin (2013), Kimberley Strassel (2014), Ayaan Hirsi Ali (2015), James Ceaser (2015), Gary Sinise (2016), Peter Berkowitz (2017), Charles R. Kesler (2018), Roger Kimball (2019), Amity Shlaes (2021), Glenn Loury (2022), John H. Cochrane (2023), Jay Bhattacharya (2024), Barry Strauss (2025), Christopher Rufo (2025), and James Piereson (2025).

The Bradley Prizes for 2020 were canceled due to the coronavirus pandemic.

== Board of directors ==
The Bradley Foundation has an 11-member board of directors that includes James T. Barry III, John Beagle, Paul Clement, Patrick English, Robert P. George, Richard Graber, Victor Davis Hanson, Cleta Mitchell, Art Pope, Reid Ribble, and Eugene Scalia.

== See also ==
- Argosy Foundation
- Bader Philanthropies
- Bradley Impact Fund
- Charter School Growth Fund
- Donors Trust
- Lyle Oberwise
- Zilber Family Foundation
