= Lyle Oberwise =

American photographer (1908–1993)

Lyle Oberwise (1908–1993) was an American photographer who meticulously documented urban life in Milwaukee, Wisconsin, from the 1930s through the early 1990s, especially its changing architecture. Upon his death in September 1993, a cache of over 43,000 color slides was found in his apartment, few of which had ever been seen by anyone but Oberwise himself.

== Personal life ==
Lyle M. Oberwise was born in Batavia, Illinois on July 5, 1908. He was an only child, the son of Matthew Oberwise and Laura Monahan Oberwise. Oberwise's father died in 1934 at the age of 50. His mother died in 1957, aged 70. Oberwise graduated from St. Charles High School in 1926. He was described by a classmate as "a real quiet guy, a real loner". By 1931 he had earned a degree in engineering from Milwaukee's Marquette University. It was the height of the Great Depression and jobs were scarce, even for those with college degrees. He spent the next several years in the Civilian Conservation Corps (CCC), then took a job as a machine operator at Milprint Packaging in Milwaukee. He married Agnes Goodrich, a librarian, in 1939. During World War II he was drafted into the United States Army and trained as a military photographer, serving with the 3374th Signal Photo Corps in the CBI (China-Burma-India) theater of operations. Upon returning home he resumed working at Milprint until 1952 when he took a job as a custodian at General Electric Apparatus Service Center in Milwaukee. He remained there until his retirement in 1973.

Oberwise never owned a car, instead traveling on foot or using public transport. He was notoriously frugal. A niece related how she and her husband once stopped at his apartment for a visit. Expecting to dine out afterwards, and even offering to pay, they were surprised when Oberwise suddenly announced, "There's plenty to eat at home...", and proceeded to cook them a box of macaroni and cheese.

== A serendipitous discovery ==
On September 25, 1993, Lyle Oberwise was found dead of a heart attack in the hallway of his fourth-floor walk-up apartment building. Paramedics arriving on the scene checked his pockets and found only a prayer book and a roll of 35mm slide film. His wife, Agnes, had died four years earlier. He had no children and no heirs, but did have two 1st cousins: Elizabeth Oberwise Reed (1913-2002) and Mercedes Oberwise Hall (1917-2010), who were both living when Lyle passed away. Their father, John H. Oberwise (1893-1969) and Lyle's father, Matthew J. Oberwise (1883-1934), were brothers. Lyle did not leave a will. In April 1994, a classified ad appeared in the local paper for an estate sale of Oberwise's remaining possessions. John Angelos, a retired high school English teacher now running a rare book, photograph and art dealership with his wife Marilyn Johnson, attended the sale. The ad had read in part, "Many historic Milwaukee photographs". Angelos recalled walking into a room stacked with boxes and boxes filled with Kodachrome slides. He was given 15 minutes to look them over and put in a sealed bid. That night he received a call telling him he now owned the entire collection.

Angelos little knew what he had stumbled upon until he began hauling all of the boxes home and examining them more systematically. They comprised eighteen albums of black-and-white prints, 750 black-and-white negatives taken during the 1930s, one box full of prints taken by Oberwise in Burma during World War II, one box of shots taken in New York City upon Oberwise's return home from the war and, finally, over 43,000 Kodachrome color slides shot in Milwaukee between 1945 and 1993.

In 1996 Angelos and Johnson were awarded the "Cream of the Cream Award" by the City of Milwaukee for their work in maintaining the collection.

== Legacy ==
In 2003, through a grant from the Lynde and Harry Bradley Foundation, the Milwaukee County Historical Society purchased the entire Oberwise collection from John Angelos and Marilyn Johnson. It has since been cataloged, indexed and placed in archival binders for public viewing.

== Bibliography ==
- Oberwise, Lyle (2007). Milwaukee at Mid-Century: The Photographs of Lyle Oberwise. Milwaukee County Historical Society. ISBN 978-0-938076-19-3
