= Helen Daniels Bader =

American philanthropist (1927–1989)

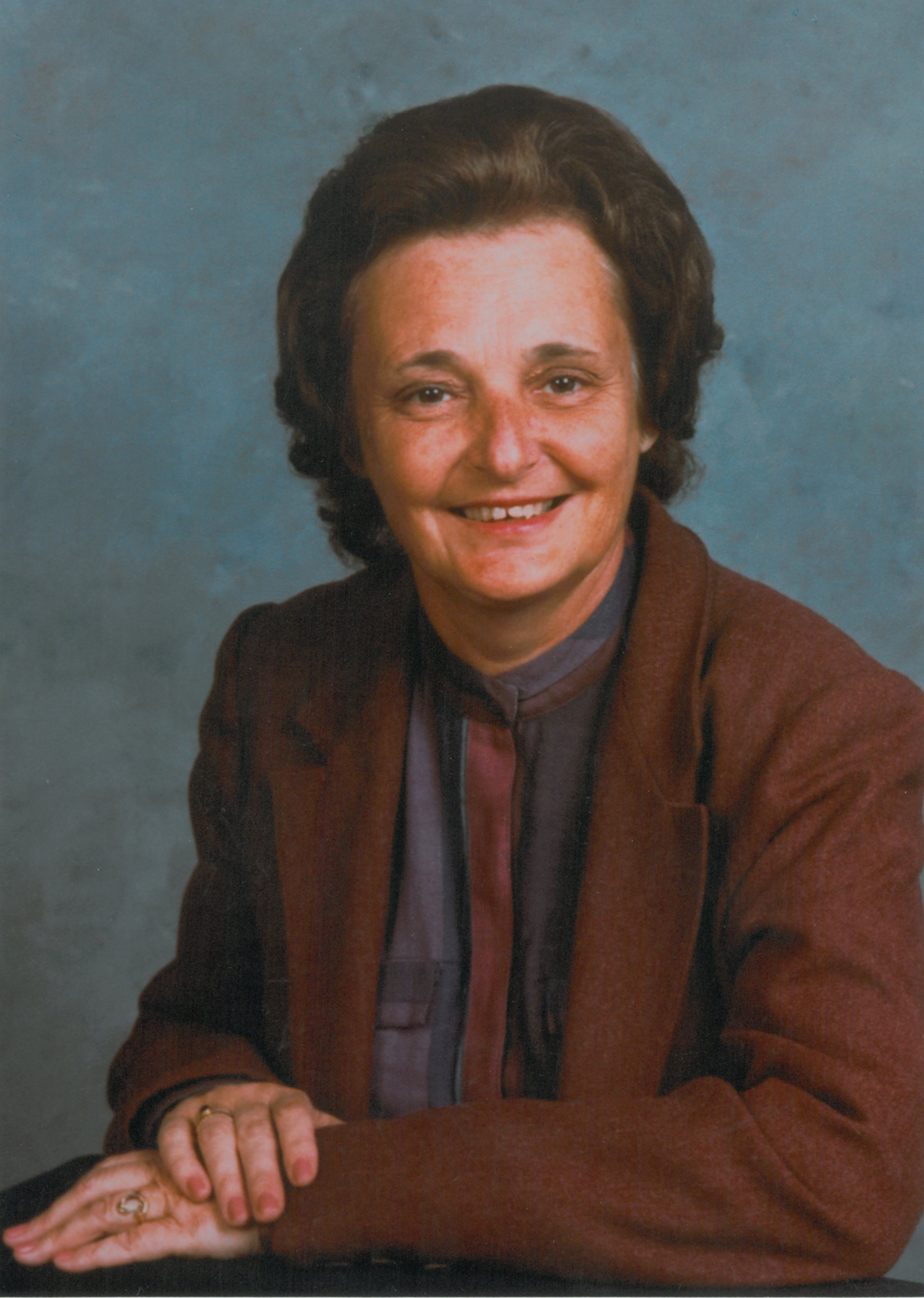
- Born: Helen Ann Daniels; May 20, 1927; Aberdeen, South Dakota, U.S.
- Died: November 21, 1989 (aged 62); Milwaukee, Wisconsin, U.S.
- Spouse: Alfred Bader (m. 1952; div. 1981)

Helen Ann Daniels Bader (20 May 1927 – 21 November 1989) was an American social worker and philanthropist. She was born and raised on the Great Plains in the railroad town of Aberdeen, South Dakota. She became half-owner of the Aldrich Chemical Company in Milwaukee, Wisconsin, founded together with her husband Alfred Bader. She completed a degree in social welfare later in life. Upon her death, Bader left the bulk of her $100 million fortune as a charitable foundation, dedicated especially to programs in Wisconsin and Israel.

== Family and education ==
=== Early years ===
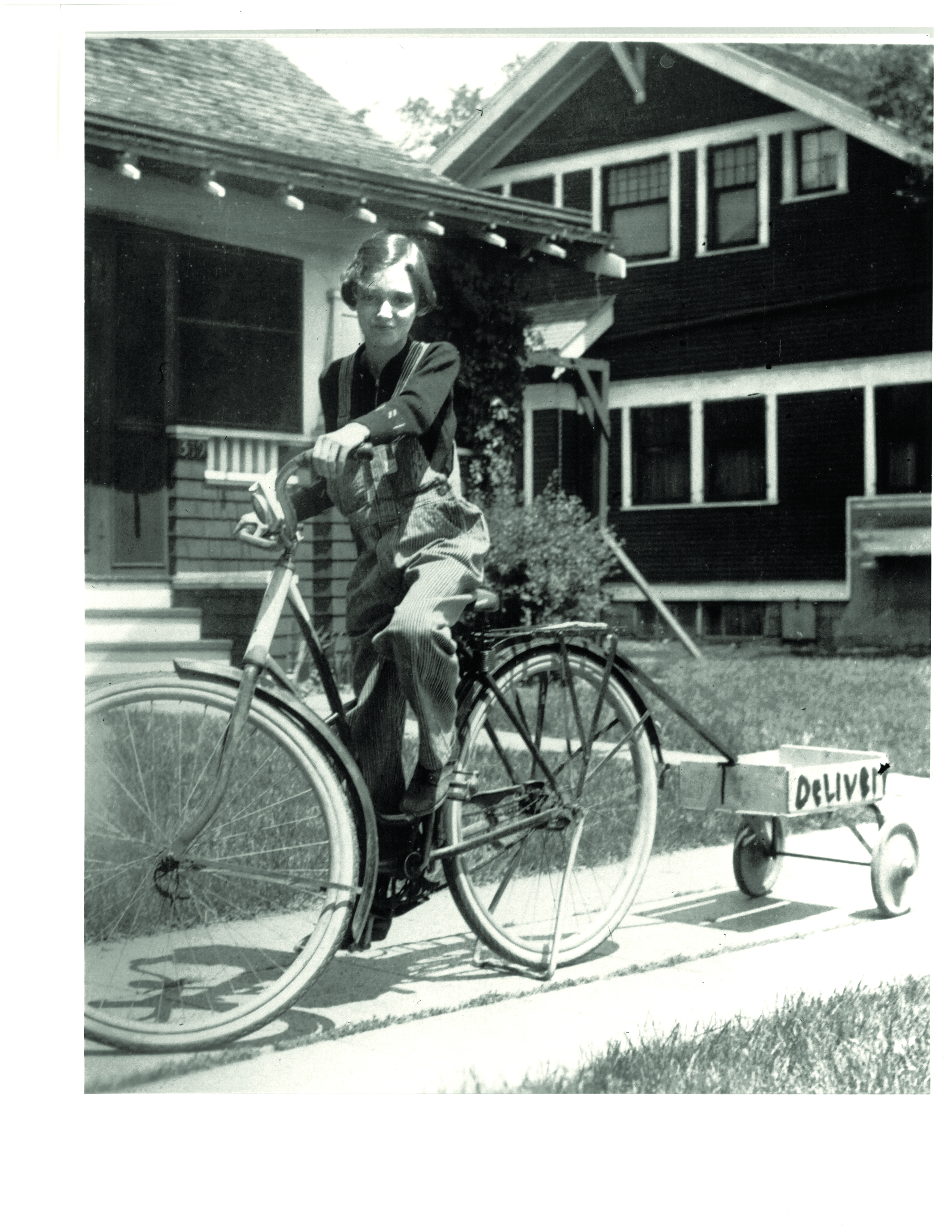
Young Helen Daniels in overalls on her bicycle.

Daniels was born in 1927 in Aberdeen, South Dakota, the daughter of Lloyd Allyn Daniels, a pharmacist, and Jessie Mabbott Daniels, a homemaker and former college-level mathematics teacher. Her sister Marjorie Jean Daniels, six years her elder, was born in 1921. As a child growing up during the Great Depression in a small railroad town on the American prairies, she wasn’t a fan of the frilly dresses that her mother made for her. She preferred to put on her overalls and go off for a ride on her bicycle. Later in their teenage years, both Marjorie and Helen helped out in their father’s drug store in various ways. After Marjorie left for college, Helen took on more responsibilities in the home, also helping her father with the running of Daniels Drugs.

=== Education ===
Daniels graduated from Aberdeen High School in May 1945, traveling by train to Wisconsin to begin her studies at Milwaukee-Downer College in September of the same year. She was following in the footsteps of her mother and elder sister, both of whom had graduated from the same institution. During her college experience, she became known on campus as "Danny" on the basis of her family name, a nickname which stayed with her throughout her life. Daniels completed her studies in June 1949, earning the Bachelor's degree in the field of botany. After graduation, Daniels went home to Aberdeen for a brief period, but soon returned to Milwaukee to begin her working career.

=== Family life ===
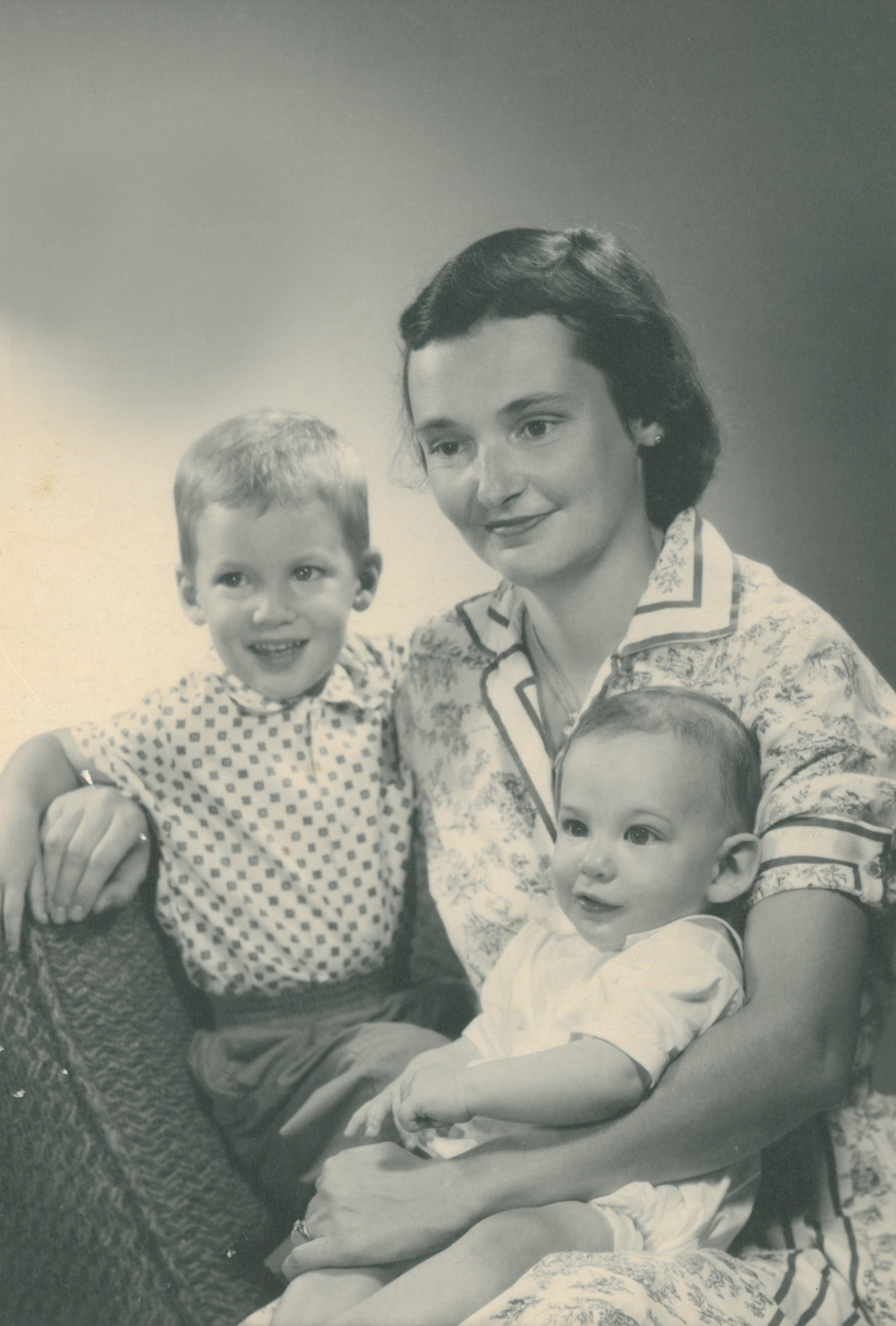
Helen Bader and sons David (left) and Daniel.

In 1950 she first met the man who would later become her husband, Alfred Bader, holder of advanced degrees in chemistry as well as a number of patents in the field. As their courtship became more serious, Daniels undertook a course of study toward conversion from her upbringing in a Christian Science household to Judaism, in accordance with Alfred's wishes. The couple was married in Milwaukee on July 6, 1952. They became full owners three years later of the Aldrich Chemical Company in Milwaukee (later Sigma-Aldrich), which had first been incorporated in 1951. Over the years that followed, Aldrich became a multi-million-dollar business, importing chemicals especially from European suppliers for use by research laboratories in the US. As Helen took on more responsibilities at the office, Alfred made her half-owner of the company. At Aldrich, it was Helen who took an abiding interest in the welfare of the employees and their families, foreshadowing her dedication to social work later in life. Helen and Alfred had been married six years when their son David was born, and their second son Daniel came along two and a half years later. The latter was named in part in honor of Helen's father, to carry on the family name, since there were no male heirs. While taking on the responsibilities of caring for her young boys, Helen nevertheless continued her work at Aldrich on a part-time basis. Beyond that, she had the full responsibility for the running of their household, including making houseguests feel welcome. Alfred frequently invited fellow chemists visiting from Europe, as well as art dealers and art historians, to stay in their home. In addition, Alfred would often travel to Europe in support of the chemical business, as well as visiting art galleries in search of fine paintings. Helen frequently accompanied him on such European trips.

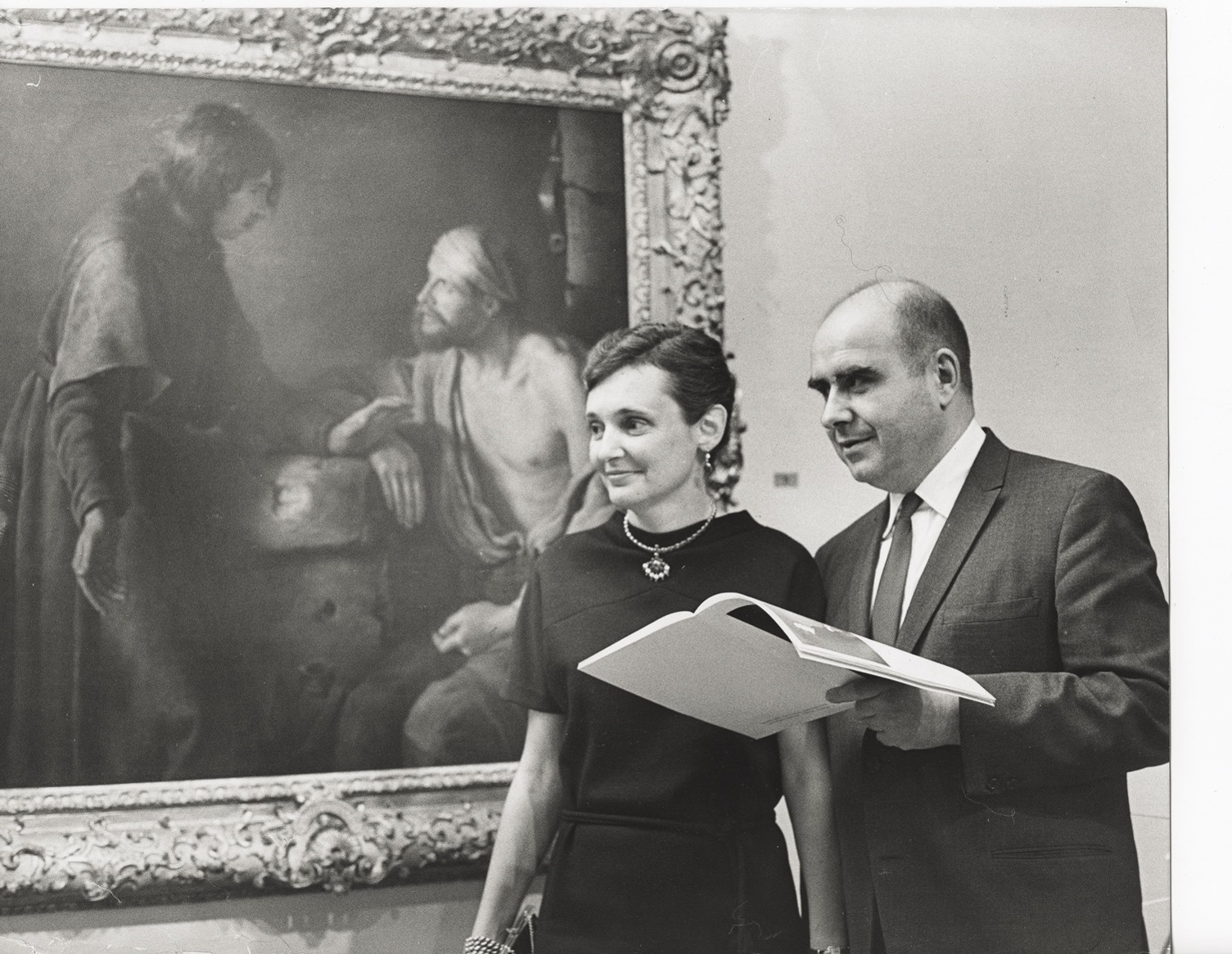
Helen and Alfred Bader at European art gallery.

In 1976 Alfred succeeded in reconnecting with an old flame in England, Isabel Overton, whom he had first met there in 1949. Over the next five years the pair developed a relationship and by 1980, Helen concluded that their marriage could last no longer. She told Alfred that she wanted a divorce, which was finalized in June of the next year. She moved out of the family home into a Milwaukee apartment.

== Social work ==
Bader's friend Nita Corré, the director of the Milwaukee Jewish Home, encouraged her to seek a graduate degree in social work and then join the staff at the Jewish Home. Corré "[saw] in her someone who was genuine, caring and generous." In January 1980 Bader enrolled in the master's program at what was then called the School of Social Welfare at the University of Wisconsin-Milwaukee. During the field placement component of the master's program she spent time at the Legal Aid Society of Milwaukee. According to their director at the time, Thomas Zander, Bader was "one of the most remarkably talented and sensitive students we ever had in terms of her ability to relate to the clients, feel comfortable with them, and advocate for their interests". Bader graduated with the Master of Social Work degree (MSW) in August 1981.

Bader was hired at the Milwaukee Jewish Home, where her job initially was as social worker for dementia patients. She soon began developing ideas and programs for such patients, to provide them with a richer experience than merely being seated for stretches of inactivity. As more study about Alzheimer's disease was being carried out, Bader attended national conferences on the subject. She instituted new best practices at the Jewish Home, including music and art therapy, sometimes herself dancing with one patient or another. Bader became frustrated with the layout of the building, and thus in 1986 was pleased that officials at the Jewish Home were considering the construction of a separate facility specifically for Alzheimer's patients, which could incorporate a more open and flexible floor plan. This proposal ultimately came to fruition after Bader's passing, with the dedication of the Helen Bader Center at the Milwaukee Jewish Home (now Ovation Jewish Home) in 1994.

== Philanthropy ==
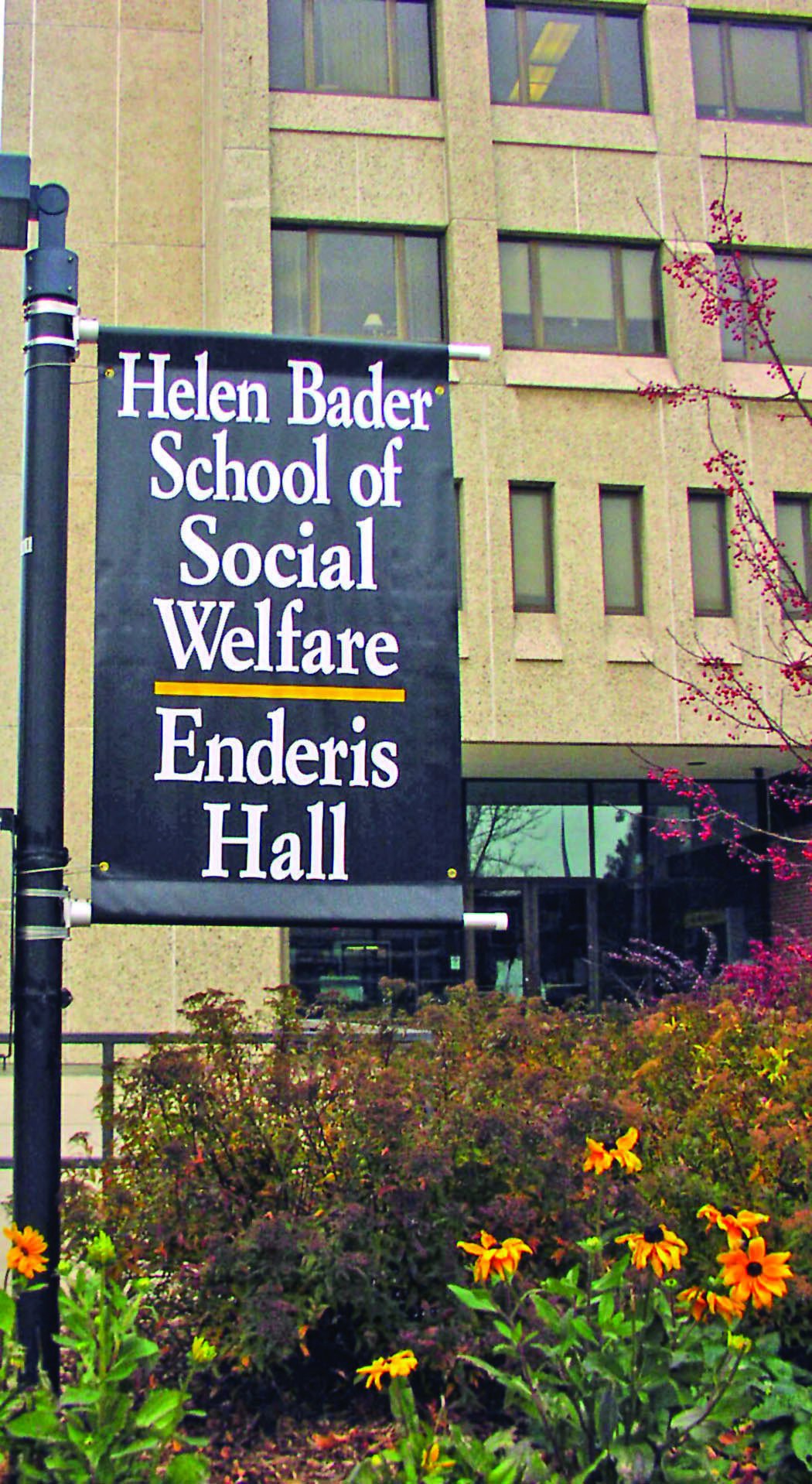
Banner at Helen Bader School, University of Wisconsin-Milwaukee.

In the early 1980s Bader set up a fund in her name with the Jewish Community Foundation in Milwaukee, through which she was able to make anonymous donations to causes about which she felt strongly. These included the Milwaukee Jewish Federation, the Legal Aid Society of Milwaukee, the Wisconsin Conservatory of Music, and the creation of an Alzheimer's unit at a care facility in Israel. At the end of her life due to cancer in 1989, the bulk of her estate went into the Helen Daniels Bader Charitable Trusts, the disbursement of which was to be directed jointly by her sons. In November 1991 the creation of the Helen Bader Foundation Inc was announced. People who had known Helen as a modest person were astonished to learn of this $100 million legacy, intended to benefit worthy causes in Milwaukee as well as Israel. Over the next 24 years, the Foundation awarded $250 million in grants to deserving causes, with special emphasis on the needs of Alzheimer's patients.

In January 2015 it was announced that the Foundation would be restructuring. Additional charitable funding by Alfred Bader and his second wife Isabel, initially in the amount of $10 million, resulted in the formation of Bader Philanthropies Inc. The organization continued Helen's legacy under what became the Helen Daniels Bader Fund, while adding the new Isabel and Alfred Bader Fund to support charitable work in line with their interests. Under both funds, monies are allocated either as grants or as program-related investments. During the period 1992–2021, some $400 million was awarded, benefiting a range of areas, including Alzheimer’s & aging, arts, employment, youth, and Jewish education.

== Legacy ==
The School of Social Welfare at the University of Wisconsin-Milwaukee was renamed the Helen Bader School of Social Welfare in a formal ceremony on October 29, 2001, after a grant of $5 million from the Helen Bader Foundation. Other sites include the Helen Bader Recital Hall at the Wisconsin Conservatory of Music, the Helen Bader Center at the Milwaukee Jewish Home (now Ovation Jewish Home), and the Helen Bader Concert Hall at the UW-M Peck School of the Arts. Scholarships have been established in her name, including the Helen Bader Scholarship Fund, administered by the Milwaukee Jewish Federation, and the Helen Daniels Bader Scholarship at Lawrence University. Additionally, the Helen Bader Leadership Speaker Series was created at the Cardinal Stritch University Leadership Center.
