= Bradley Impact Fund =

American nonprofit donor-advised fund

- Formation: 2012
- Type: Nonprofit (IRC § 501(c)(3))
- Tax ID no.: 45-4678325
- Location: Milwaukee, Wisconsin, U.S.
- Services: Donor-advised fund
- President: Gabriel Conger
- Board of directors: John Beagle; Phil Prange; Patrick English; Art Pope; Roger Ream
- Affiliations: Lynde and Harry Bradley Foundation
- Revenue: $85 million (2023)
- Expenses: $68.9 million (2023)
- Endowment: $115 million (2023)

The Bradley Impact Fund is an American donor-advised fund established in 2012 and based in Milwaukee, Wisconsin. A 501(c)(3) public charity, it provides philanthropic services to donors who support conservative causes and organizations in the United States.

== History and organization ==
Founded in February 2012, the Bradley Impact Fund is aligned with the Bradley Foundation, a Milwaukee-based private foundation established in 1942. The Impact Fund was created to advance shared principles by cultivating a dynamic community of donors committed to supporting organizations that restore and strengthen America's founding principles and institutions through a donor-advised fund model, allowing donors to make contributions, receive tax benefits, and recommend grants to nonprofit organizations over time.

The fund describes itself as "the first donor-advised fund, a 501(c)(3) public charity, to be affiliated with a private foundation."

== Leadership ==
Gabe Conger serves as president of the Bradley Impact Fund. Before joining the organization, he served as adviser to the president for donor relations at the Heritage Foundation and previously worked at the Leadership Institute.

== Mission and principles ==
The Fund describes its mission as providing philanthropic advisory services that "educate, empower, and inspire donors" while protecting donor intent. It organizes its activities around five stated principles:

- Fidelity to the Constitution,
- Commitment to free markets,
- Support for civil society,
- Dedication to the formation of informed and capable citizens,
- Protection of donor intent

== Financial information ==
The Fund has experienced significant growth since its founding. According to IRS filings, it reported total revenue of $31,697,461 in 2020, with expenses of $23,617,176 and assets of $22,357,268. By 2022, these figures had substantially increased, with total revenue of $108,123,443, total expenses of $67,735,663, and total assets reaching $115,040,326.

According to an audited financial statement filed with the California Department of Justice, more than 75 percent of contributions to the Bradley Impact Fund in 2022 came from four sources, including three donations of $36 million, $20 million, and $18 million, respectively. At least $12.7 million came from DonorsTrust, another donor-advised fund.

== Grant recipients and activities ==
The Bradley Impact Fund provides grants to organizations advancing conservative ideas, policy research, and educational initiatives. In recent years, the fund's largest grants have been awarded to the America First Legal Foundation ($27.1 million in 2022), Turning Point USA ($7.76 million in 2022), Project Veritas ($2 million in 2021), and the Foundation for Excellence in Higher Education ($1.89 million in 2022).

The fund is a consistent supporter of the State Policy Network (SPN), a coalition of free-market state-level policy organizations. In 2022, it made contributions to SPN member organizations, including the Acton Institute for the Study of Religion and Liberty ($172,500). Additional recipients have included the Conservative Partnership Institute ($712,310 in 2022) and America's Future ($500,000 in 2022).

== Funding network and analysis ==
The Bradley Impact Fund operates as part of a broader network of conservative philanthropic organizations. As a donor-advised fund, it provides donors with anonymity while allowing them to recommend grants to specific organizations.

Political reform and watchdog organizations have characterized the fund as influential within conservative circles. Michael Beckel, research director for the bipartisan political reform group Issue One, stated that "the Lynde and Harry Bradley Foundation and Bradley Impact Fund have emerged as major forces in MAGA circles" and are "shaping politics and policymaking in ways that will be felt for years to come."

== Recognition ==
The Bradley Impact Fund has received a four-star rating from Charity Navigator, the highest distinction from this independent evaluator of non-profit organizations, based on its financial health and accountability metrics.

== See also ==
- Lynde and Harry Bradley Foundation
- Donor-advised fund
- Philanthropy
