= Aldrichimica Acta =

- Discipline: Chemistry
- Language: English

Publication details
- History: 1968–present
- Publisher: Sigma-Aldrich (USA)
- Open access: Yes
- Impact factor: 17.083 (2014)

Standard abbreviations
- ISO 4: Aldrichim. Acta

Indexing
- CODEN: ALACBI
- ISSN: 0002-5100

Links
- Journal homepage

Aldrichimica Acta is a scientific journal published by Sigma-Aldrich. Established in 1968 in Milwaukee, Wi, Aldrichimica Acta publishes reviews in the field of synthetic organic chemistry, with each issue focusing on a special topic. The journal is open access. In 2015, the Acta was ranked #1 among journals in the field of organic chemistry by impact factor.

== History ==
In 1968, Aldrich Chemical Company published Volume 1, Number 1 edition of Aldrichimica Acta. The Acta both replaced Klarindex Sheets as a scientific journal meant specifically to keep chemists informed, as well as complemented the company's world-famous annual catalog, the Aldrich Handbook of Fine Chemicals. Aldrich founder Alfred Bader and created the journal with an emphasis on both the reliability of Aldrich, but also on art. Despite seeing mergers with Sigma Chemical Company of St. Louis in 1975 and Merck KGaA in 2015, the journal has retained its name.

== Artwork ==
Not only did Alfred Bader believe that science and art are miscible, but he saw art as an essential component of the journal. As an avid art collector, he used pieces within his personal collection for the covers of the journal. Each edition of Aldrichimica Acta contains a unique piece of art on the cover, as well a description on the inside to give the reader more information.
