= Yoshiaki Fujimori =

Japanese businessman (born 1951)

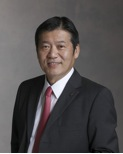
- Born: 1951 (age 74–75)
- Education: University of Tokyo; Carnegie Mellon University
- Known for: CEO, Lixil Group (2011–2016)
- Board member of: Takeda Pharmaceutical Company; Boston Scientific

Yoshiaki "Fuji" Fujimori (born 1951) is a Japanese businessman. Between August 2011 and June 2016 he was the president and CEO of Lixil Group, a Japan headquartered manufacturer of building materials and housing equipment with net sales of $16.8bn, where he oversaw a globalization strategy that included the acquisition of global interests including Permasteelisa, American Standard Brands and GROHE Group. Under his leadership, Lixil expanded its ratio of sales from outside of Japan from 3% in 2010 to 30.3% in 2016.

== Early life ==
Fuji was born and raised in Tokyo, Japan. He earned a bachelor's degree in petroleum engineering from the University of Tokyo and an MBA from Carnegie Mellon University, where he serves on the board of trustees since 2004.

== Career ==
Prior to Lixil, Fujimori spent 25 years at General Electric Company, where he held various posts including chairman of GE Japan (2009–2011), senior vice president of GE Money (2005–2009), CEO of GE Asia (2003–2005), CEO of GE Plastics (2001–2003), senior vice president of GE Healthcare Asia (1997–2001), as well as serving as a member of the corporate executive council. He started his career at Japanese trading company, Nisho Iwai Corporation (now Sojitz).

Fuji served as an external director of Tokyo Electric Power Company for over ten years. He is a senior executive advisor to CVC Capital Partners, and serves on the boards of Takeda Pharmaceutical Company., Boston Scientific, Shiseido, Toshiba Corporation and Oracle Corporation Japan.
