= Zilber Family Foundation =

American charitable foundation

- Formation: 2009
- Type: Charitable Foundation
- Headquarters: Milwaukee, WI, United States
- President: Marcy Jackson
- Key people: James Janz; Steve Chevalier; Michael Mervis; Melissa S. A. Jackson; Shane Jackson; Marilyn Zilber; John K. Tsui
- Revenue: $600,548 (2015)
- Expenses: $2,232,167 (2015)
- Website: zilberfamilyfoundation.org

The Zilber Family Foundation is a Milwaukee, Wisconsin based foundation that was founded in 2009.

== History ==
The foundation was formed in 1961. It is a private, independent grant-making institution that describes itself as being "dedicated to enhancing the well being of individuals, families, and neighborhoods."

== Governance ==
- Susan Lloyd, executive director
- Marcy Zilber Jackson, president
- James Janz, Vice-president
- Steve Chevalier, Secretary-Treasurer
- Melissa S. A. Jackson
- Shane Jackson
- Marilyn Zilber
- John K. Tsui

== Grantees ==
These are among the grants awarded:

- 2015, a grant to Neighborhood House for iPads and headsets for Burmese students to use
- 2015, $300,000 to the organization MKE Plays to "transform deteriorated playgrounds and turn them into models of public and private collaboration."
- 2015, the Zilber Neighborhood Initiative, a $50 million grant making program to improve neighborhoods in Milwaukee
- 2014, $400,000 to the University of Wisconsin-Milwaukee's Joseph J. Zilber School of Public Health to establish a Vera Zilber Public Health Scholars program
- 2014, a five-year, $25,000 grant to continue its support of Ronald Reagan International Baccalaureate (IB) High School's music program
- 2014, a $100,000 grant to Neu-Life Community Development

== See also ==
- Argosy Foundation
- Bader Philanthropies
- Bradley Foundation
