= Sharona Muir =

American writer and academic

Sharona Muir (née Bentov) is an American writer and academic.

== Early life ==
Muir is the daughter of the late Israeli-American inventor and author, Itzhak Bentov, who died as a passenger on American Airlines Flight 191 in 1979. She graduated from Princeton University in 1978, received an M.A. in Creative Writing and English from Boston University in 1980, and a Ph.D. in Modern Thought and Literature from Stanford University in 1991.

== Work ==
She taught at Stanford University, and is currently a professor of creative writing at Bowling Green State University.

Muir's debut novel, Invisible Beasts, was published by Bellevue Literary Press in 2014. A bestiary in novel form, featuring imaginary animals based on scientific facts, Invisible Beasts was named a Title to Pick Up Now in O, The Oprah Magazine, as well as a Publishers Weekly Book of the Week and a Top Indie Fiction Selection by Library Journal.

Muir's most recent novel, "Animal Truth and Other Stories", won the Publishing Lab prize for innovative fiction from the University of New Orleans Press, and was published by UNO Press in 2022.

Muir's memoir, The Book of Telling: Tracing the Secrets of My Father's Lives, published by Random House/Schocken Books in 2005, was positively reviewed in The Times Literary Supplement, by Kapka Kassabova, March 10, 2006; and in The Jerusalem Post, by Barbara Hollander, December 9, 2005. The memoir received the 2007 Nancy Dasher Award for the best book in the creative writing category, from the College English Association of Ohio. The memoir deals with Muir's search for the past of her scientist father, Itzhak Bentov. A paperback edition was subsequently published by the University of Nebraska Press.

Muir's work has appeared in The New York Times, Granta, The Kenyon Review, The Jerusalem Report, Harvard Magazine, The Virginia Quarterly Review, Ploughshares, The Paris Review, The Yale Review, and many other journals. Her tales, "Menu:Extinction", "The Golden Egg: An Evolutionary Fable", "Think Monkey", and "Feral Parfumier Bees", may be seen in the online editions of, respectively, Granta, The Kenyon Review (KROnline), Michigan Quarterly Review, and Ancora Imparo.

== Selected awards ==
- 2022 Ohio Arts Council, Individual Excellence Award, fiction
- 2018 Ohio Arts Council, Individual Excellence Award, fiction
- 2002 Ohio Arts Council, Individual Excellence Award, nonfiction
- 2001 National Endowment for the Arts Fellowship
- 1998 The Hodder Fellowship: Fellows
- 1997 and 2002, Ohio Arts Council Fellowships in poetry and nonfiction
- 1996 Memorial Foundation for Jewish Culture Fellowship
- 1990 Whiting Foundation Fellowship for doctoral studies
- 1984 Bernard F. Connors Prize for Poetry

== Works ==
=== Poetry ===
- Heredity and Other Inventions C&R Press, 2017
- "The Angel of Memory". AGNI. 2002.
- "The Most Unsafe Market in Jerusalem". AGNI. 2002.
- During Ceasefire. Harper & Row. 1985. ISBN 978-0-06-015384-7.

=== Fiction ===
- Animal Truth. University of New Orleans Press. 2022. ISBN 978-1-60801-238-1.
- Invisible Beasts. Bellevue Literary Press. 2014. ISBN 978-1-934137-80-2.

=== Memoir ===
- The Book of Telling: Tracing the Secrets of My Father's Lives. University of Nebraska Press. 2008. ISBN 978-0-8032-1648-8.

=== Literature ===
- The Artificial Paradise: Science Fiction And American Reality. University of Michigan Press. 1995. ISBN 978-0-472-10580-9.
