= Peter Nicholas (businessman) =

American businessman and philanthropist (1941–2022)

- Born: Peter Michael Nicholas; May 16, 1941; Portsmouth, New Hampshire, U.S.
- Died: May 14, 2022 (aged 80); Boca Grande, Florida, U.S.
- Education: Duke University (BA); University of Pennsylvania (MBA)
- Known for: Co-founder of Boston Scientific
- Spouse: Virginia "Ginny" Lilly (m. 1964)

Peter Michael Nicholas (May 16, 1941 – May 14, 2022) was an American businessman and philanthropist. He co-founded medical device firm Boston Scientific with partner John Abele in 1979.

== Early life ==
Nicholas was born in Portsmouth, New Hampshire, on May 16, 1941. He was the second of four children of Nicholas Nicholas and Vrysula (Coucouvitis), both of whom immigrated to the United States from Greece. His father was a United States Navy career officer and served during World War II. Nicholas attended St. Paul's School in his home state, where he was a letterman in baseball, football, and squash. Although he was accepted into the United States Naval Academy, he did not pass an entrance physical examination due to his eyesight. He then received a late admission into Duke University, graduating in 1964. After serving in the U.S. Navy as a communications officer on the USS Lookout and member of the special operations warfare group for two years, he undertook postgraduate studies at the Wharton School of the University of Pennsylvania, obtaining a Master of Business Administration in 1968.

== Career ==
Nicholas first worked for Eli Lilly and Company in sales, marketing, and management for a decade from 1968 to 1978. He subsequently acted as general manager of the Millipore Corporation's medical products division.

Nicholas first met scientist John Abele at a Christmas party in Concord in 1979. The latter was president of Meditech at the time. They borrowed $800,000 to start Boston Scientific, a manufacturer of medical devices. He helped grow the company through a series of astute acquisitions. Nicholas was chief executive officer of the company until 1999, when he became chairman. He continued in that role until his retirement in 2016.

Nicholas was chairman emeritus of the Duke board of trustees. He was ranked #78 by Forbes magazine's 2005 list of "The 400 Richest Americans", with an estimated worth of $4 billion, before finishing #189 the following year. Nicholas was one of seven Greek Americans to feature on the aforementioned list.

The Nicholas family gave $20 million to Duke University in 1996 for the School of the Environment, which subsequently renamed the school in his honor. In 2000, Nicholas was a recipient of the Ellis Island Medal of Honor. Eight years later, Nicholas and his wife pledged a further $72 million to Duke; $70 million to the Nicholas School of the Environment, and $2 million to Perkins Library. He served on the board of advisors of the Nicholas Institute for Environmental Policy Solutions, which he established.

== Personal life ==
Nicholas married Virginia (Ginny) Lilly, a descendant of Eli Lilly, in 1964, shortly after they both graduated from Duke University. They met while studying at the institution, and remained married until his death. Together, they had three children: Peter Jr., J.K., and Katherine. All three graduated from Duke, as did one of their granddaughters.

Nicholas died on May 14, 2022, at his home in Boca Grande, Florida, aged 80. He had been diagnosed with cancer.

== Recognition ==
- Golden Plate Award of the American Academy of Achievement, 1997
- Phoenix Lifetime Achievement Award
- Ellis Island Medal of Honor, 2000
- AdvaMed Lifetime Achievement Award, 2016
