= Diphenolic acid =

Organic acid

Names
- Preferred IUPAC name 4,4-Bis(4-hydroxyphenyl)pentanoic acid
- Other names 4,4-Bis(4-hydroxyphenyl)valeric acid

Identifiers
CAS Number	126-00-1
3D model (JSmol)	Interactive image
ChemSpider	60518
ECHA InfoCard	100.004.331
PubChem CID	67174
UNII	2SIZ2CO5L3
CompTox Dashboard (EPA)	DTXSID0022436
- InChI: InChI=1S/C17H18O4/c1-17(11-10-16(20)21,12-2-6-14(18)7-3-12)13-4-8-15(19)9-5-13/h2-9,18-19H,10-11H2,1H3,(H,20,21) Key: VKOUCJUTMGHNOR-UHFFFAOYSA-N; InChI=1/C17H18O4/c1-17(11-10-16(20)21,12-2-6-14(18)7-3-12)13-4-8-15(19)9-5-13/h2-9,18-19H,10-11H2,1H3,(H,20,21) Key: VKOUCJUTMGHNOR-UHFFFAOYAX
- SMILES: CC(CCC(=O)O)(C1=CC=C(C=C1)O)C2=CC=C(C=C2)O

Properties
Chemical formula	C_{17}H_{18}O_{4}
Molar mass	286.327 g·mol^{−1}
Appearance	White to brown crystals
Melting point	168 to 171 °C (334 to 340 °F; 441 to 444 K)
Boiling point	507 °C (945 °F; 780 K)

Hazards
- Occupational safety and health (OHS/OSH)
Main hazards	Fire and explosion hazard with strong oxidisers Incompatible with bases
Flash point	274.5 °C (526.1 °F; 547.6 K)
Safety data sheet (SDS)	MSDS
- Except where otherwise noted, data are given for materials in their standard state (at 25 °C [77 °F], 100 kPa). verify (what is ?) Infobox references

Diphenolic acid is a carboxylic acid with molecular formula C_{17}H_{18}O_{4}. Its IUPAC name is 4,4-bis(4-hydroxyphenyl)pentanoic acid, and it can be prepared by the condensation reaction of phenol with levulinic acid in the presence of hydrochloric acid.

The equation for this synthesis is: 2 C_{6}H_{5}OH + CH_{3}C(O)CH_{2}CH_{2}COOH → CH_{3}C(p-C_{6}H_{4}OH)_{2}CH_{2}CH_{2}COOH + H_{2}O

Diphenolic acid is a solid at room temperature, melting at 168–171 °C and boiling at 507 °C. According to its MSDS, diphenolic acid is soluble in ethanol, isopropanol, acetone, acetic acid, and methyl ethyl ketone, but insoluble in benzene, carbon tetrachloride, and xylene.

Diphenolic acid may be a suitable replacement for bisphenol A as a plasticizer.

Diphenolate esters have been used to synthesize epoxy resins as a replacement for the diglycidyl ether of bisphenol A.The diglycidyl ethers of n-alkyl diphenolate esters have similar thermomechanical properties to the diglycidyl ether of bisphenol A when cured, but the viscosity and glass transition temperature vary as a function of the ester length. Diphenolate esters have also been used to synthesize polycarbonates with a potential for water solubility.
