= Argosy Foundation =

U.S. charitable trust

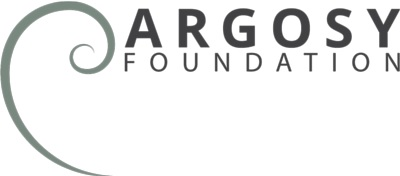
- Formation: 1995
- Headquarters: Milwaukee, Wisconsin
- Board of directors: Jeneye Abele, Chris Abele, Alex Abele, John Abele, Mary Abele
- Key people: Jeneye Abele, President and Chief Executive
- Formerly called: Abele Family Charitable Trust

The Argosy Foundation, founded in 1997, is currently based in Milwaukee, Wisconsin. It was formerly known as the Abele Family Charitable Trust.

== History ==
The foundation was established in 1995 with a $9 million endowment from John Abele. In 2002, it was reported that the foundation would move to Milwaukee with a net worth of over $450 million and that it had a history of supporting "liberal social and environmental causes." It was also reported that the foundation trustees were the five members of the Abele family: Chris, Alex, Jennifer, John Abele, and his wife.

== Grantees ==
These are among the grants awarded:

- 2012 award of 1.2 million dollars to Olin College of Engineering
- 2013 award of 70,000 to a San Francisco company, Energy Foundation, which has been linked to a conservative-based super PAC the Congressional Leadership Fund
- 2013 award of 100,000 dollars to Conservation Law Foundation
- 2013 award of 65,000 dollars to Forestethics
- 2013 award of 20,000 dollars to Center for Biological Diversity
- 2013 award of 300,000 dollars to the Rocky Mountain Institute
- 2012 award of 250,000 dollars to For Inspiration and Recognition of Science and Technology

== See also ==
- Bradley Foundation
- Bader Philanthropies
- Zilber Family Foundation
