= John Abele =

American businessman

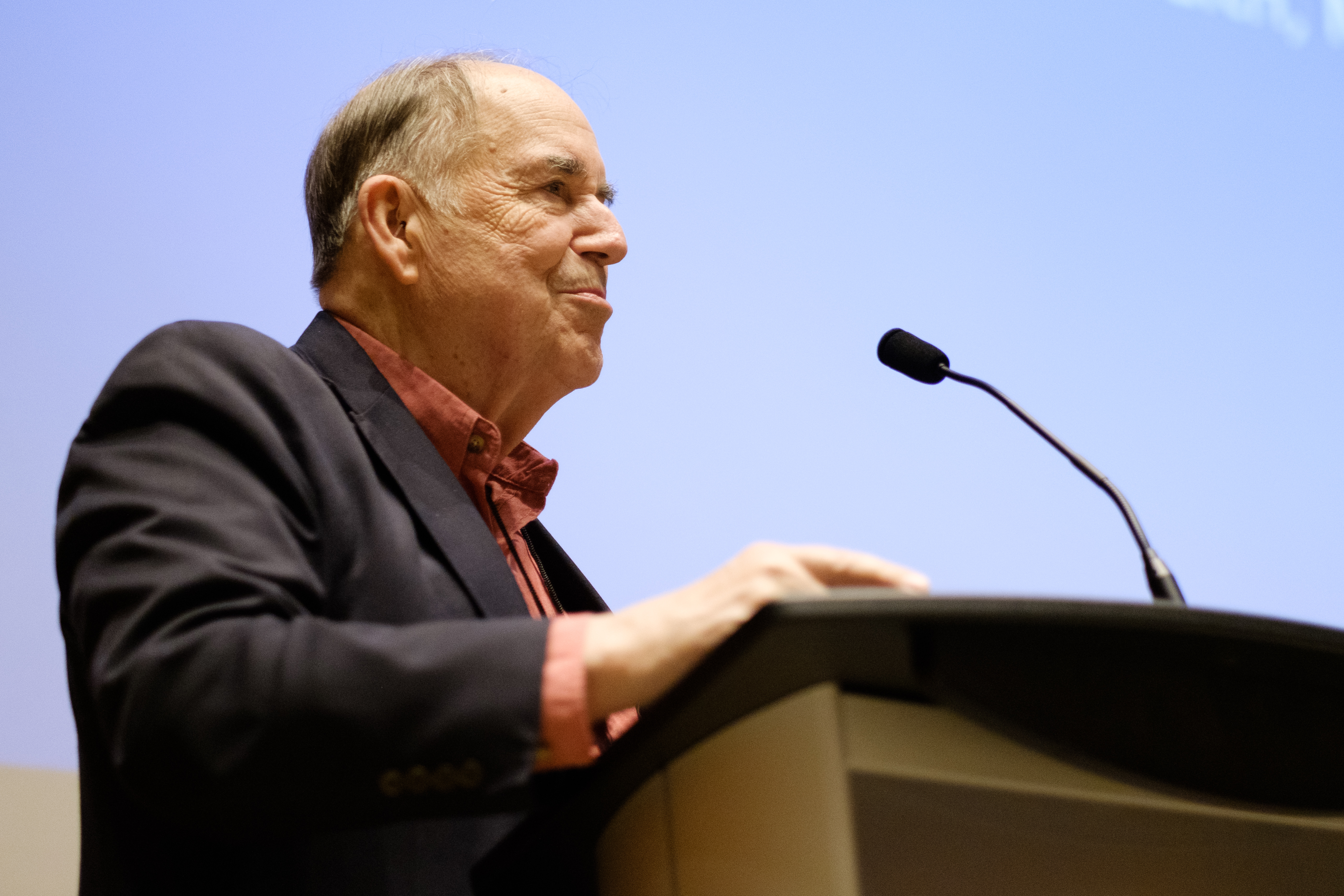
- Abele in 2017
- Born: 1937 (age 88–89); New London, Connecticut, U.S.
- Education: Amherst College (BS)
- Known for: Co-founder of Boston Scientific
- Spouse: Mary Abele
- Children: 3, including Chris

John E. Abele (born 1937) is an American businessman and co-founder of Boston Scientific, a medical device company. He received the ASME Medal in 2010 and, as of November 2024, has a net worth of $1.9 billion. He was first listed on the Forbes 400 in 1996 as a self-made billionaire. Although he has given away a significant portion of his wealth, he remains Vermont's only billionaire, residing in Shelburne. Through his private family foundation, the Argosy Foundation, Abele has donated over $130 million to charitable causes since 2001.

== Early life and education ==
Abele was raised in a "Classic Yankee family," the youngest of three sons of Catherine (née Eaton) and Lieutenant Commander Mannert L. Abele, USN. His father was the commanding officer of the submarine USS Grunion when the vessel was lost in the Aleutians on July 31, 1942, presumably to enemy action.

John and his brothers later organized, managed, and funded research to locate and photograph the Grunion – which was found in the Bering Sea – document the cause, and locate relatives of all the crew. At the age of seven, Abele was stricken with osteomyelitis, a bacterial infection of the bone, requiring multiple surgeries and years of using crutches. He is a graduate of Amherst College with a double major in physics and philosophy (he later was a trustee).

== Career ==
Abele started his career at a light-fixture company in the Midwest before moving to New England to work for a small medical firm near Boston. He later co-founded Boston Scientific with Peter Nicholas.

He was the chairman of FIRST robotics from 2002 to 2010.

Abele is a member of the USA Science and Engineering Festival's advisory board.

== Personal life ==
Abele is married to Mary Abele. They live in Shelburne, Vermont, and have three children, including Chris Abele. Chris Abele successfully ran for Milwaukee County executive in 2010.
