= Bader Philanthropies =

- Type: Private charitable foundation
- Founded: 1992
- Headquarters: Milwaukee, Wisconsin
- Key people: Daniel Bader President and CEO; David Bader Vice President
- Revenue: 28,510,416 United States dollar (2022)
- Total assets: 22,344,402 United States dollar (2022)
- Number of employees: 19
- Website: https://bader.org/

Bader Philanthropies Inc. is a Milwaukee, Wisconsin, based foundation that consists of funds from the Helen Daniels Bader Fund and the Isabel and Alfred Bader Fund. It pledges to give away $14 million annually. The organization centers on the health of older adults and improving lives of low-income Milwaukeeans, as well as Jewish education in Milwaukee.

== History ==
The Helen Daniels Bader Fund has a history of focusing on Alzheimer's and the health of older adults, while the Isabel and Alfred Bader Fund focuses on "improving the lives of low-income Milwaukeeans and Jewish education throughout the city."

The creation of the Helen Bader Foundation Inc was first announced in November 1991. Over the next 24 years, the Foundation awarded $250 million in grants to deserving causes, with special emphasis on the needs of Alzheimer's patients.

In January 2015 it was announced that the Foundation would be restructuring. Additional charitable funding by Alfred Bader and his second wife Isabel, initially in the amount of $10 million, resulted in the formation of Bader Philanthropies Inc. The organization continued Helen's legacy under what became the Helen Daniels Bader Fund, while adding the new Isabel and Alfred Bader Fund to support charitable work in line with their interests. Under both funds, monies are allocated either as grants or as program-related investments. During the period 1992–2021, some $400 million was awarded, benefiting a range of areas, including Alzheimer’s & aging, arts, employment, youth, and Jewish education.

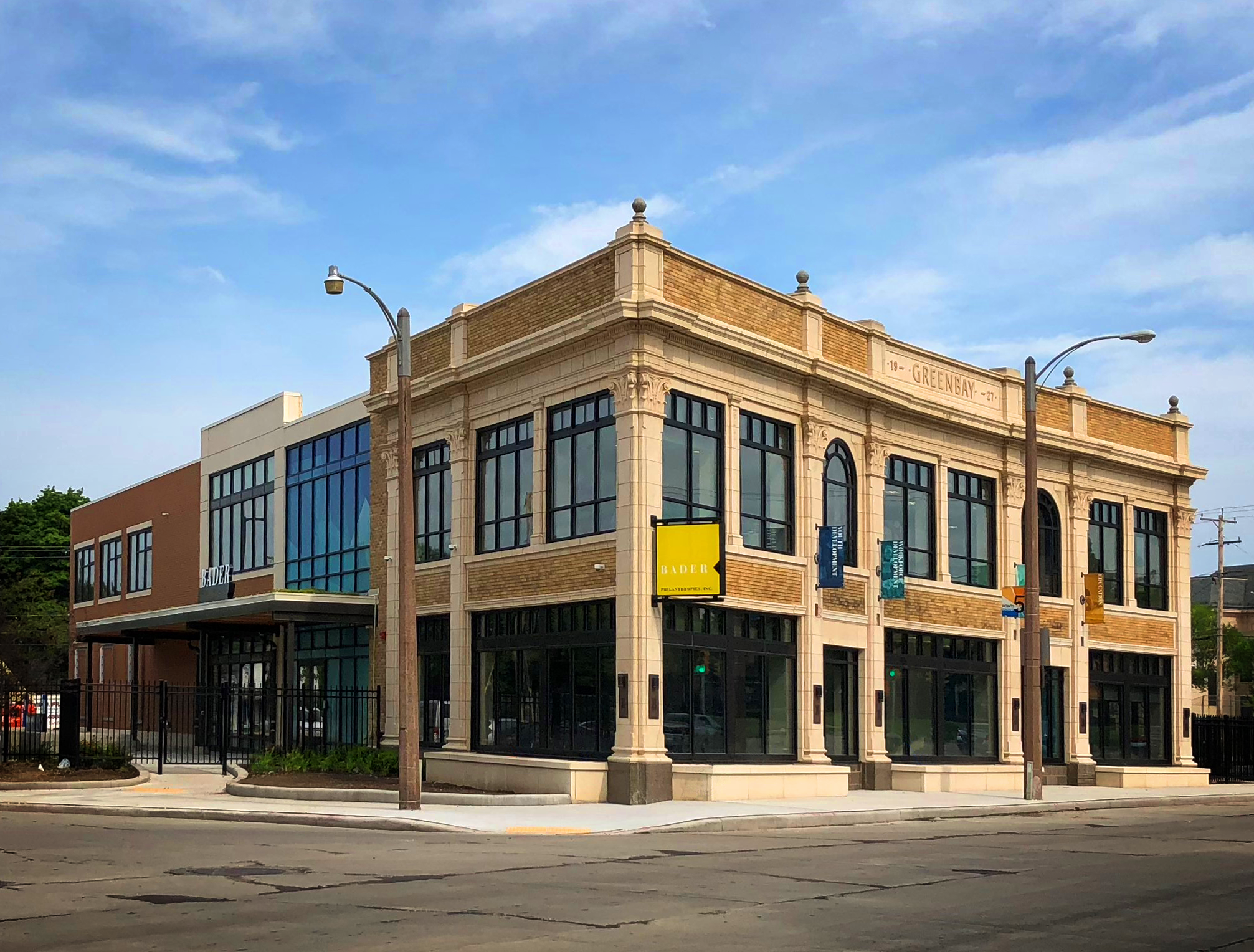
Bader Philanthropies headquarters in the Harambee neighborhood, Milwaukee, Wisconsin

In earlier years, what was then the Helen Bader Foundation had its offices in Milwaukee's third ward, in the downtown area. As Bader Philanthropies Inc, the organization relocated to new headquarters in Milwaukee's Harambee neighborhood in 2018.

== Governance ==
- Daniel Bader, president and chief executive officer, second son of Alfred Bader and Helen Bader
- David Bader, vice president and executive board member, elder son of Alfred Bader and Helen Bader

== Grantees ==
These are among grants recently awarded:

- 2022, Electa Quinney Institute for American Indian Education at the University of Wisconsin-Milwaukee, in the amount of $3 million, to be distributed over a five-year period
- 2023, Milwaukee Habitat for Humanity
- 2023, Wiener Holocaust Library, London, UK
- 2023, Hispanic Professionals of Greater Milwaukee, in the amount of $350,000 over a two-year period
- 2023, African American Leadership Alliance of Milwaukee
- 2023, Milwaukee Art Museum, in the amount of $4.4 million, to establish the Isabel and Alfred Bader European Art Program Endowment Fund, in order "to support its collection and exhibition of European artwork, including related scholarship."

== See also ==
- Argosy Foundation
- Zilber Family Foundation
