= Milwaukee =

Largest city in Wisconsin, United States

Milwaukee Potawatomi: Ménéwek
- City
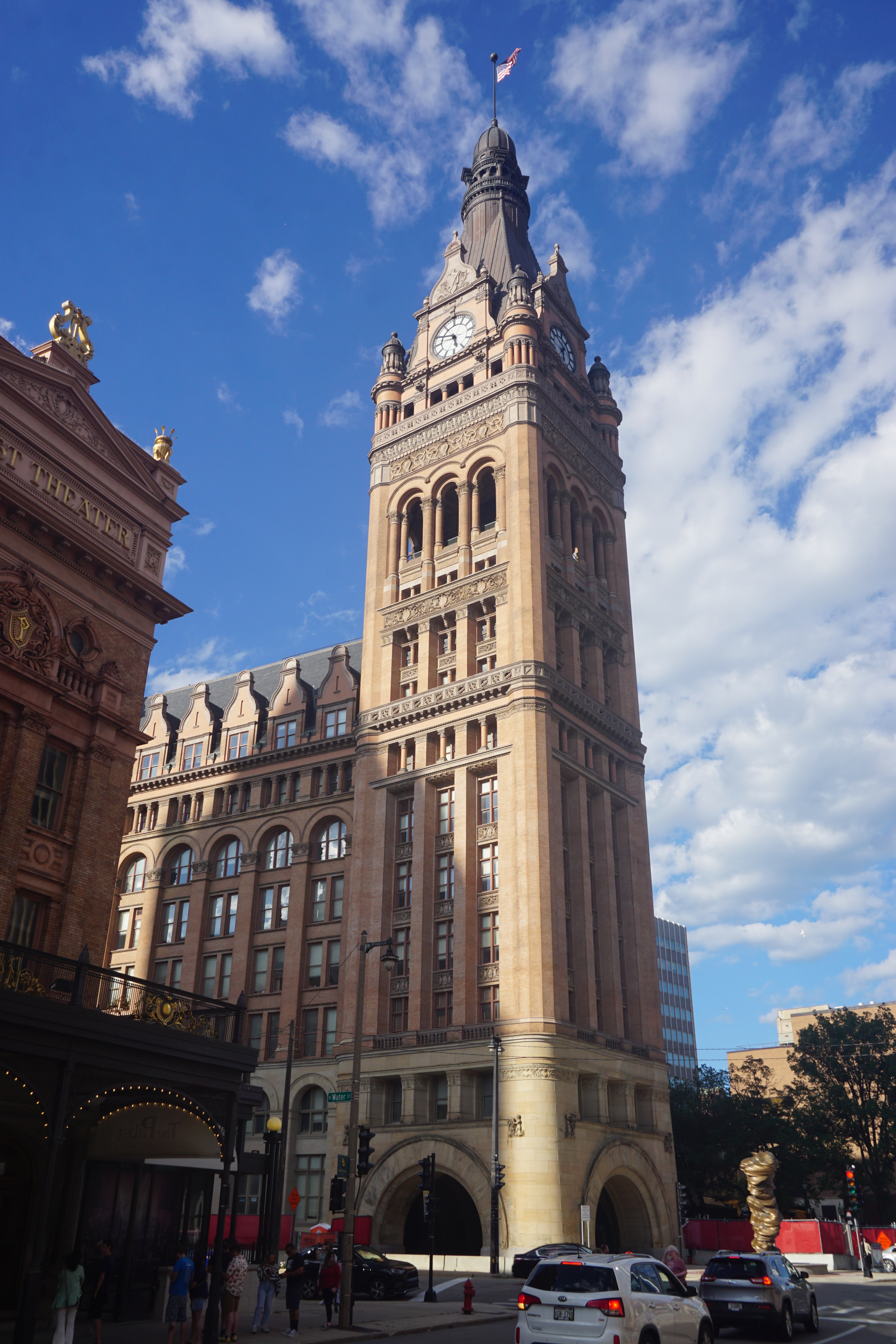
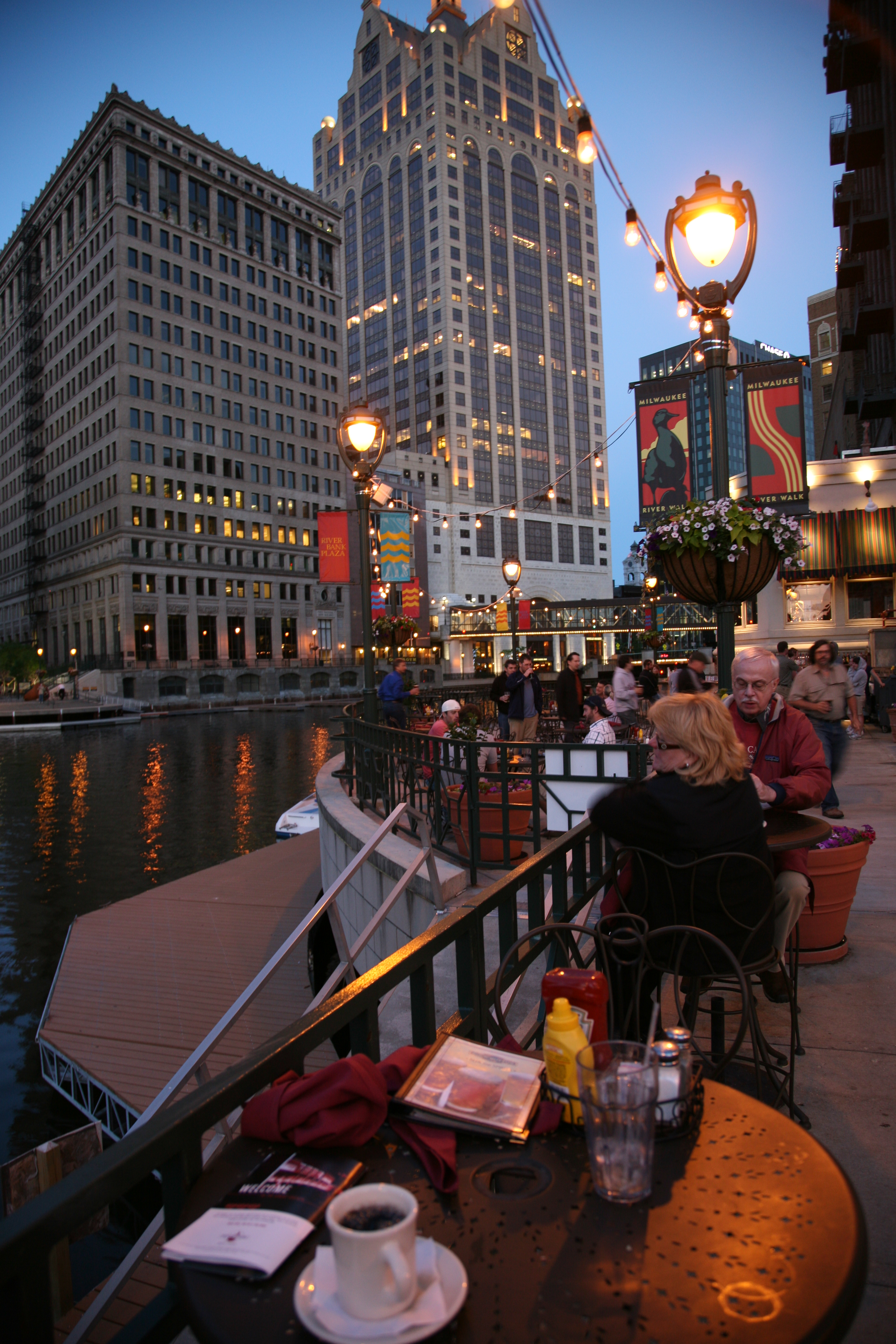
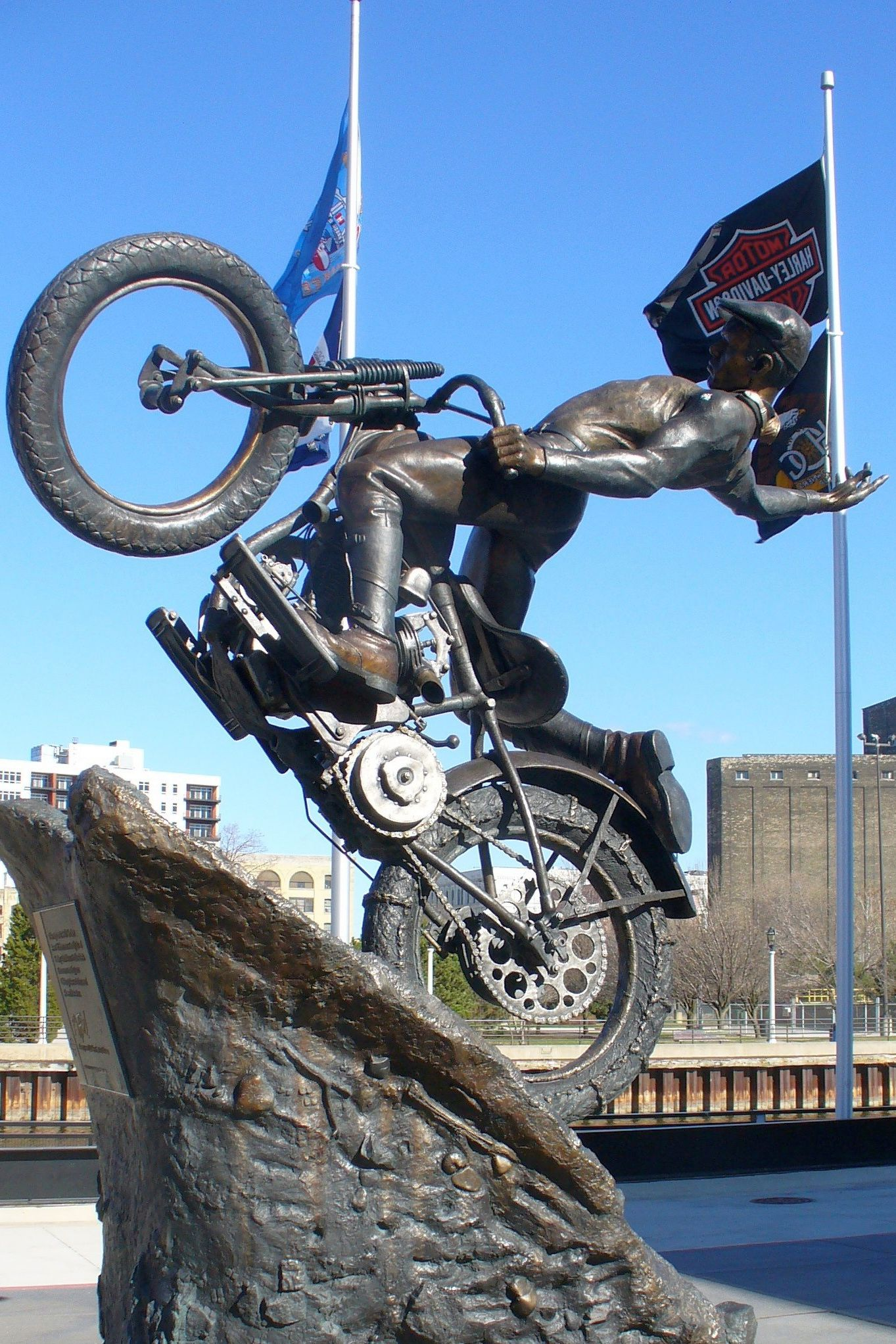
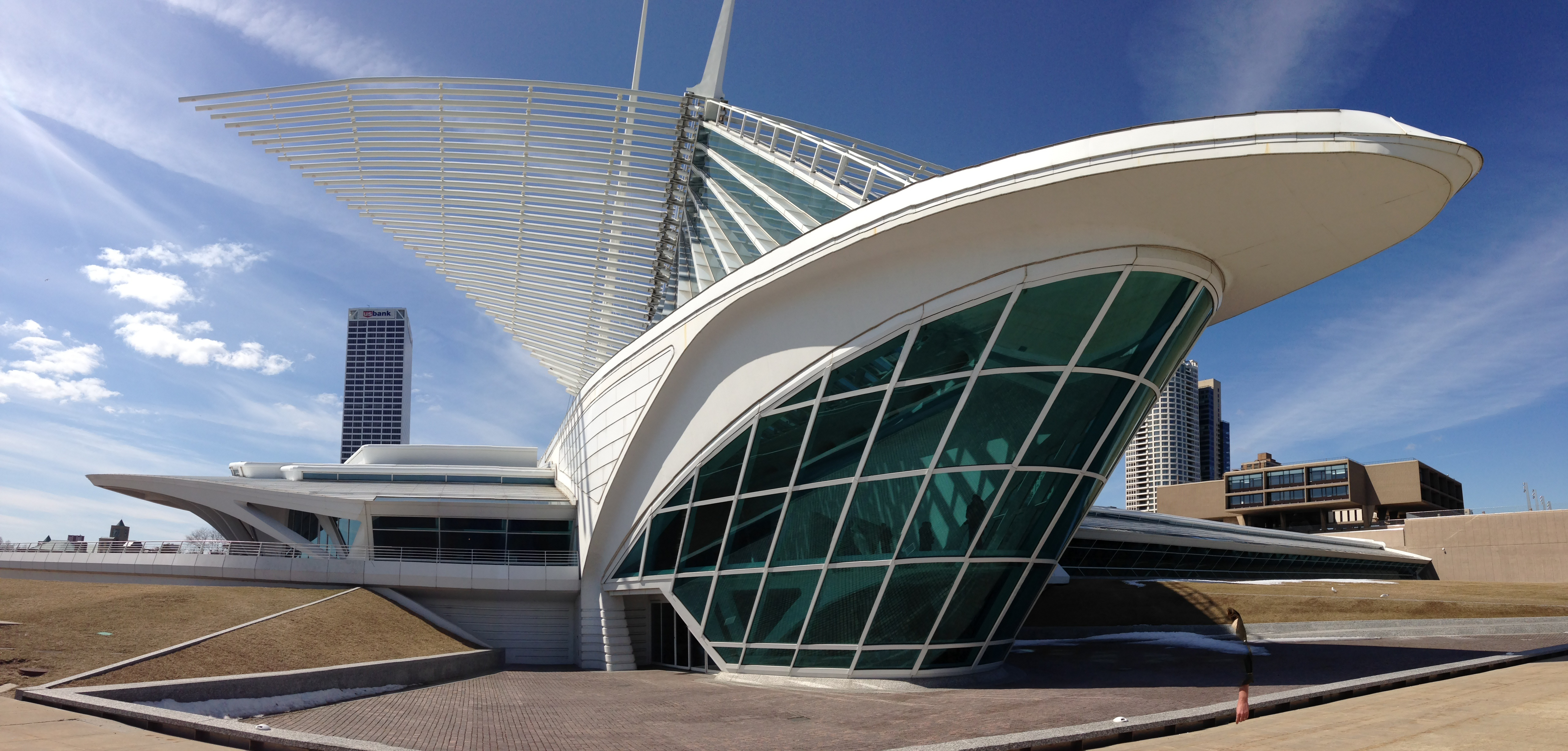
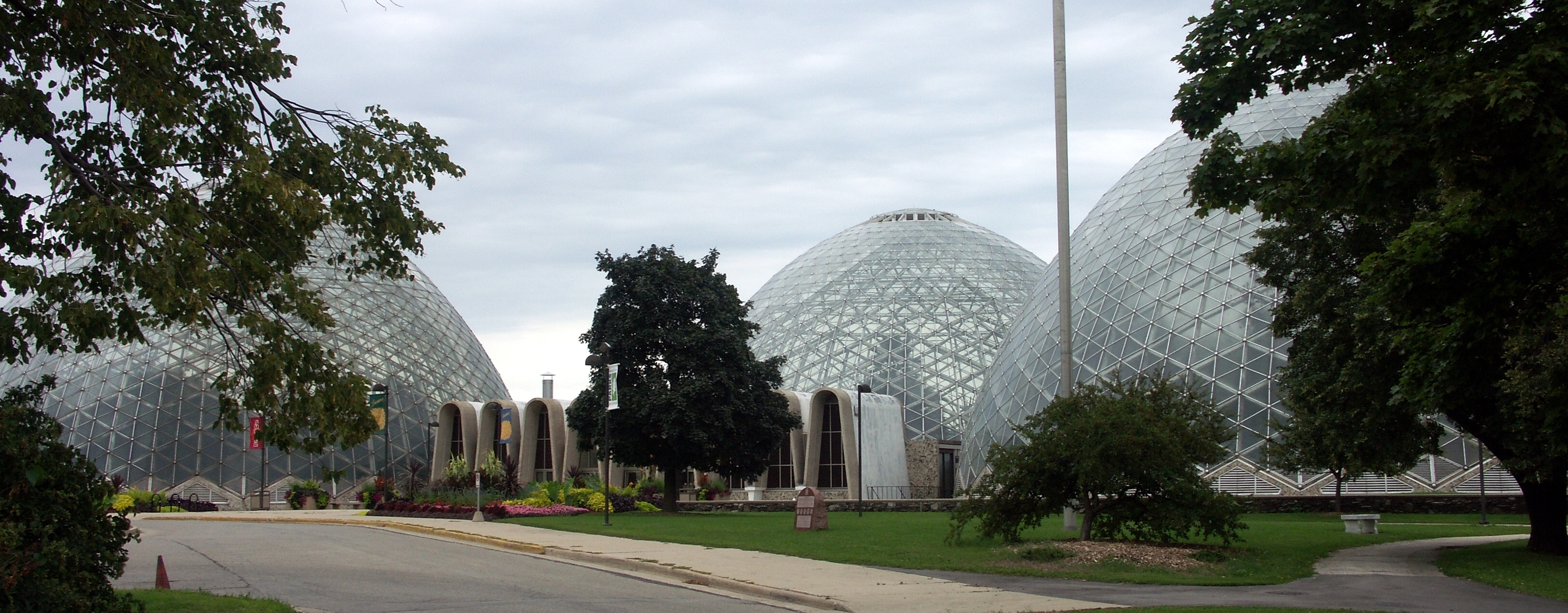
- Downtown Milwaukee Milwaukee City Hall Milwaukee Riverwalk Harley Museum Milwaukee Art Museum American Family Field Mitchell Park Horticultural Conservatory

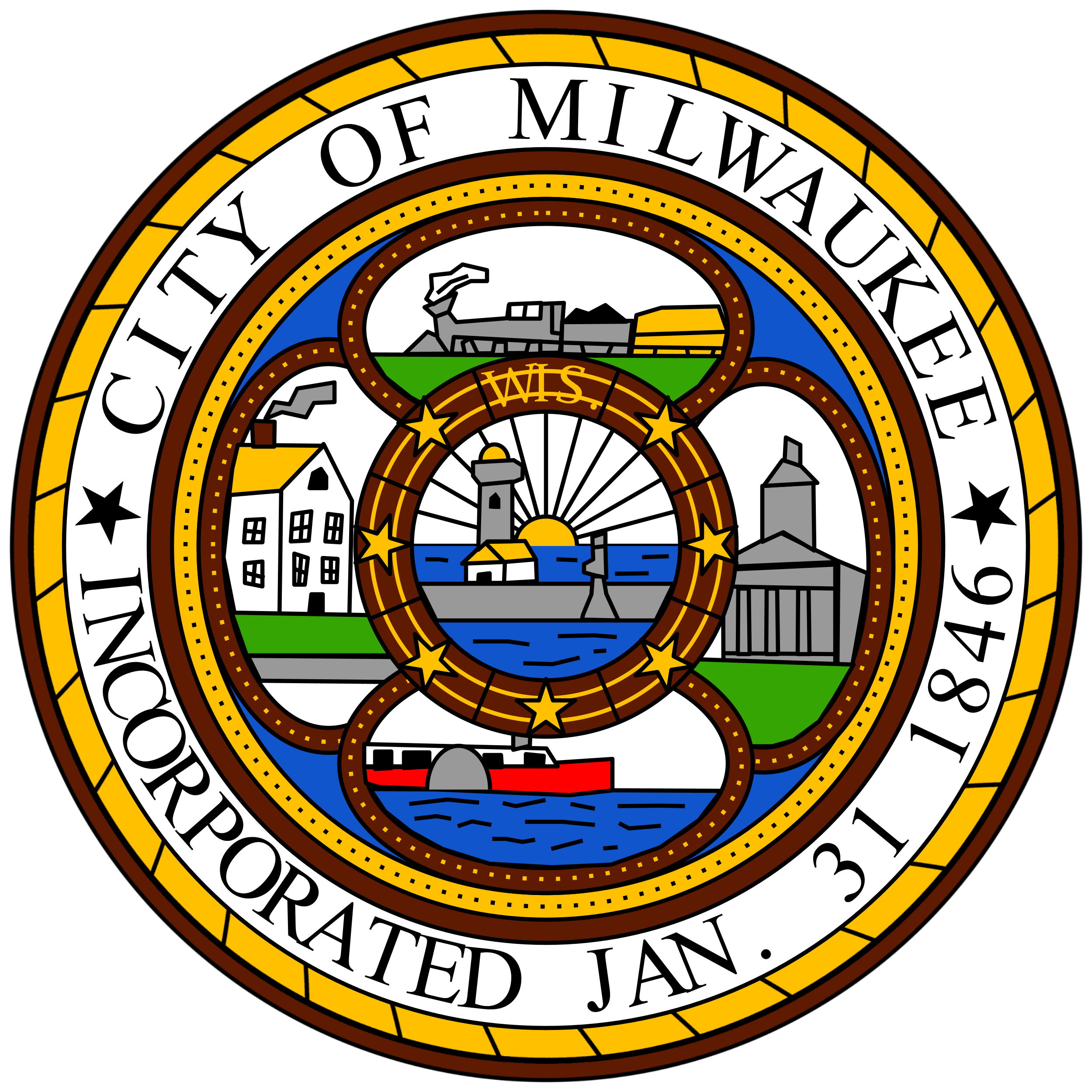
- Flag Seal Logo
- Nicknames: Cream City, Brew City, MKE, City of Festivals, The Mil, The Good Land, The 414
- Interactive map of Milwaukee
- Location within Wisconsin Location within the United States
- Coordinates: 43.05°N 87.95°W
- Country: United States
- State: Wisconsin
- Counties: Milwaukee, Washington, Waukesha
- Incorporated: January 31, 1846; 180 years ago
- Founder: Solomon Juneau, Byron Kilbourn, and George H. Walker
- Named for: Potawatomi for "gathering place by the water"

Government
  - Type: Strong mayor-council
  - Body: Milwaukee Common Council
  - Mayor: Cavalier Johnson (D)

Area
  - City: 96.82 sq mi (250.75 km^{2})
  - Land: 96.19 sq mi (249.12 km^{2})
  - Water: 0.63 sq mi (1.63 km^{2})
- Elevation: 617 ft (188 m)

Population (2020)
  - City: 577,222
  - Estimate (2025): 562,407 ▼
  - Rank: 85th in North America; 31st in the United States; 1st in Wisconsin
  - Density: 6,001.1/sq mi (2,317.0/km^{2})
  - Urban: 1,306,795 (US: 38th)
  - Urban density: 2,818/sq mi (1,088.2/km^{2})
  - Metro: 1,574,731 (US: 40th)
  - CSA: 2,049,805 (US: 33rd)
- Demonym: Milwaukeean

GDP
  - Metro: $130.857 billion (2022)
  - Per capita: $83,098 (2022)
- Time zone: UTC−06:00 (CST)
  - Summer (DST): UTC−05:00 (CDT)
- ZIP Codes: 532XX: 53201–53216, 53218–53228, 53233–53235, 53237, 53259, 53263, 53274, 53278, 53288, 53290, 53293, 53295
- Area code: 414
- FIPS code: 55-53000
- Geographic Names Information System feature ID: 1577901
- Website: city.milwaukee.gov

Milwaukee (Note: /mɪlˈwɔːki/ mil-WAW-kee, locally /məˈwɔːki/ mə-WAW-kee) is the most populous city in the U.S. state of Wisconsin. Located on the western shore of Lake Michigan, it had a population of 577,222 at the 2020 census, making it the 31st-most populous city in the United States and the fifth-most populous city in the Midwest. The Milwaukee metropolitan area has over 1.57 million residents and ranks as the 40th-largest metropolitan area in the nation. The city is the county seat of Milwaukee County.

Lying at the confluence of the Milwaukee, Menomonee, and Kinnickinnic rivers, present-day Milwaukee was inhabited by various Algonquian peoples before European and American settlement. Milwaukee developed as an inland port following the 1833 Treaty of Chicago and was incorporated in 1846. Industrialization attracted waves of immigrants and migrants in the late 19th and early 20th centuries, when Milwaukee became a center of German-American culture. During this period, the city became known for being a national leader in beer production and for its sewer socialism movement.

The regional GDP of Milwaukee was over $130 billion in 2023. The city is home to the headquarters of Fortune 500 companies Northwestern Mutual, Fiserv, ManpowerGroup, Rockwell Automation, and WEC Energy Group. Historically, the production of beer in Milwaukee was led by the Miller, Pabst, and Schlitz breweries; Miller products are still brewed in the city today. Motorcycle manufacturer Harley-Davidson is also headquartered in the city and operates the Harley-Davidson Museum downtown.

Milwaukee is an ethnically and culturally diverse city, though it continues to be one of the most racially segregated cities in the U.S. as a result of early-20th century redlining. Its cultural institutions include the Milwaukee Art Museum, Milwaukee Public Museum, Mitchell Park Horticultural Conservatory, and Summerfest, one of the world's largest music festivals. It is home to several institutions of higher education, including Marquette University, Milwaukee School of Engineering, and the University of Wisconsin–Milwaukee. The city's major professional sports teams are the Milwaukee Brewers (MLB) and Milwaukee Bucks (NBA).

== History ==
=== Name ===
The etymological origin of the name Milwaukee is disputed. Wisconsin academic Virgil J. Vogel has said, "the name [...] Milwaukee is not difficult to explain, yet there are a number of conflicting claims made concerning it."

One theory says it comes from the Anishinaabemowin/Ojibwe word mino-akking, meaning "good land", or words in closely related languages that mean the same. These included Menominee and Potawatomi. This theory was popularized by a line by Alice Cooper in the 1992 comedy film Wayne's World. Another theory is that it stems from the Meskwaki language, whose term for "gathering place" is mahn-a-waukee. The city of Milwaukee itself claims that the name is derived from mahn-ah-wauk, a Potawatomi word for "council grounds".

The name of the future city was spelled in many ways prior to 1844. People living west of the Milwaukee River preferred the modern-day spelling, while those east of the river often called it Milwaukie. Other spellings included Melleokii (1679), Millioki (1679), Meleki (1684), Milwarik (1699), Milwacky (1761), Milwakie (1779), Millewackie (1817), Milwahkie (1820), and Milwalky (1821). The Milwaukee Sentinel used Milwaukie in its headline until it switched to Milwaukee on November 30, 1844. The city of Milwaukie, Oregon, retains the alternate spelling.

=== Indigenous cultures ===
Indigenous cultures lived along the waterways for thousands of years. The first recorded inhabitants of the Milwaukee area were various Native American tribes: the Menominee, Meskwaki, Mascouten, Sauk, Potawatomi, and Ojibwe (all Algic/Algonquian peoples), and the Ho-Chunk (Winnebago, a Siouan people). Many of these people had lived around Green Bay before migrating to the Milwaukee area at about the time of European contact.

In the second half of the 18th century, the Native Americans living near Milwaukee played a role in all the major European wars on the North American continent. During the French and Indian War, a group of "Ojibwas and Pottawattamies from the far [Lake] Michigan" (i.e., the area from Milwaukee to Green Bay) joined the French-Canadian Daniel Liénard de Beaujeu at the Battle of the Monongahela. In the American Revolutionary War, the Native Americans around Milwaukee were some of the few groups to ally with the rebel Continentals.

After the American Revolution, the Native Americans fought the newly-formed United States in the Northwest Indian War as part of the Council of Three Fires. During the War of 1812, they held a council in Milwaukee in June 1812, which resulted in their decision to attack Chicago in retaliation against American expansion. This resulted in the Battle of Fort Dearborn on August 15, 1812, the only known armed conflict in Chicago. The battle convinced the American government to remove these groups of Native Americans from their indigenous land. After being attacked in the Black Hawk War in 1832, the Native Americans in Milwaukee signed the 1833 Treaty of Chicago with the United States. In exchange for ceding their lands in the area, they were to receive monetary payments and lands west of the Mississippi in Indian Territory.

=== European settlement ===
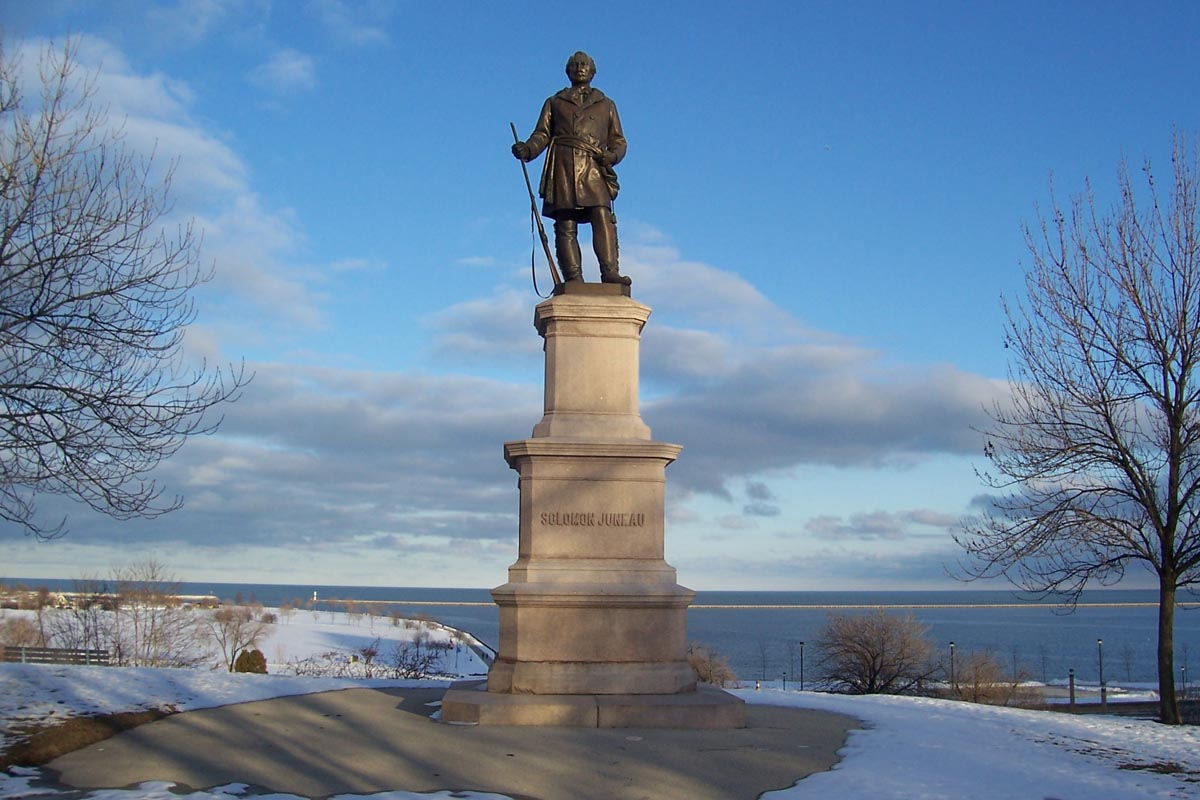
Statue of Solomon Juneau, who helped establish the city of Milwaukee

Europeans arrived in the Milwaukee area before the 1833 Treaty of Chicago. French missionaries and traders first passed through the area in the late 17th and 18th centuries. Alexis Laframboise, coming from Michilimackinac (now in Michigan), settled a trading post in 1785 and is considered the first resident of European descent in the Milwaukee region.

One story on the origin of Milwaukee's name says,

[O]ne day during the thirties of the last century [1800s] a newspaper calmly changed the name to Milwaukee, and Milwaukee it has remained until this day.

The spelling "Milwaukie" lives on in Milwaukie, Oregon, named after the Wisconsin city in 1847, before the current spelling was universally accepted.

Milwaukee has three "founding fathers": Solomon Juneau, Byron Kilbourn, and George H. Walker. Solomon Juneau was the first of the three to come to the area, in 1818. He founded a town called Juneau's Side, or Juneautown, that began attracting more settlers. In competition with Juneau, Byron Kilbourn established Kilbourntown west of the Milwaukee River. He ensured the roads running toward the river did not join with those on the east side. This accounts for the large number of angled bridges that still exist in Milwaukee today. Further, Kilbourn distributed maps of the area which only showed Kilbourntown, implying Juneautown did not exist or the river's east side was uninhabited and thus undesirable. The third prominent developer was George H. Walker. He claimed land to the south of the Milwaukee River, along with Juneautown, where he built a log house in 1834. This area grew and became known as Walker's Point.

The first large wave of settlement to the areas that would later become Milwaukee County and the City of Milwaukee began in 1835, following removal of the tribes in the Council of Three Fires. Early that year it became known that Juneau and Kilbourn intended to lay out competing town-sites. By the year's end both had purchased their lands from the government and made their first sales. There were perhaps 100 new settlers in this year, mostly from New England and other Eastern states. On September 17, 1835, the first election was held in Milwaukee; the number of votes cast was 39.

By 1840, the three towns had grown, along with their rivalries. There were intense battles between the towns, mainly Juneautown and Kilbourntown, which culminated with the Milwaukee Bridge War of 1845. Following the Bridge War, on January 31, 1846, the towns were combined to incorporate as the City of Milwaukee, and elected Solomon Juneau as Milwaukee's first mayor.

=== Growth and immigration ===
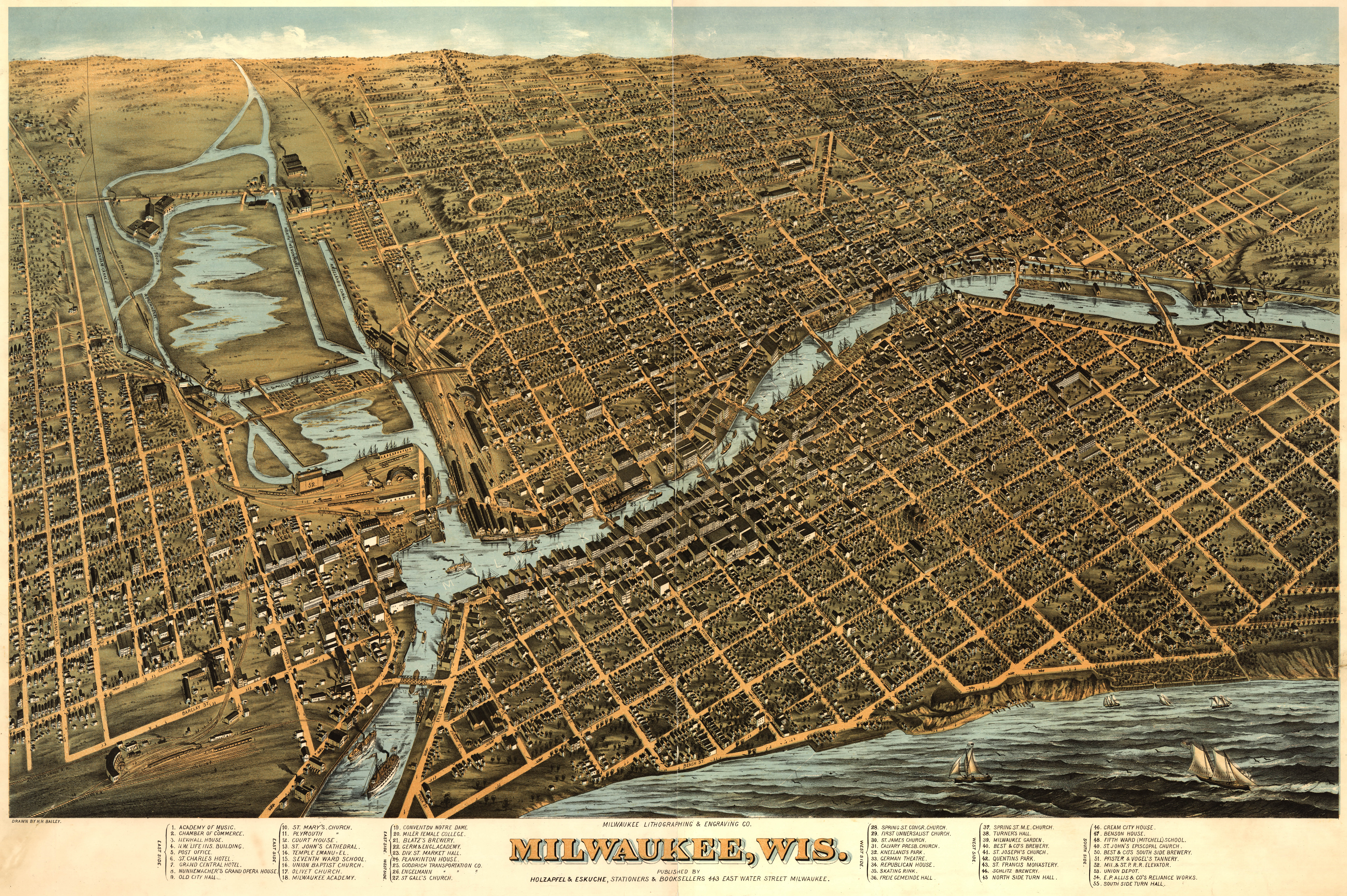
Illustrated map of Milwaukee in 1872

Milwaukee began to grow as a city as high numbers of immigrants, mainly German, made their way to Wisconsin during the 1840s and 1850s. Scholars classify German immigration to the United States in three major waves, and Wisconsin received a significant number of immigrants from all three. The first wave from 1845 to 1855 consisted mainly of people from Southwestern Germany, the second wave from 1865 to 1873 concerned primarily Northwestern Germany, while the third wave from 1880 to 1893 came from Northeastern Germany. By 1900, 34 percent of Milwaukee's population was of German background. The largest number of German immigrants to Milwaukee came from Prussia, followed by Bavaria, Saxony, Hanover, and Hesse-Darmstadt. Milwaukee gained its reputation as the most German of American cities not just from the large number of German immigrants it received, but also for the sense of community that the immigrants established.

Most German immigrants came to Wisconsin in search of inexpensive farmland. However, immigration began to change in character and size in the late 1840s and early 1850s, due to the 1848 revolutionary movements in Europe. After 1848, hopes for a united Germany had failed, and revolutionary and radical Germans, known as the "Forty-Eighters", immigrated to the U.S. to avoid imprisonment and persecution by German authorities. In 1865 the Academy of Music opened in Milwaukee.

One of the most famous "liberal revolutionaries" of 1848 was Carl Schurz. He later explained in 1854 why he came to Milwaukee,

"It is true, similar things [cultural events and societies] were done in other cities where the Forty-eighters [sic] had congregated. But so far as I know, nowhere did their influence so quickly impress itself upon the whole social atmosphere as in 'German Athens of America' as Milwaukee was called at the time."

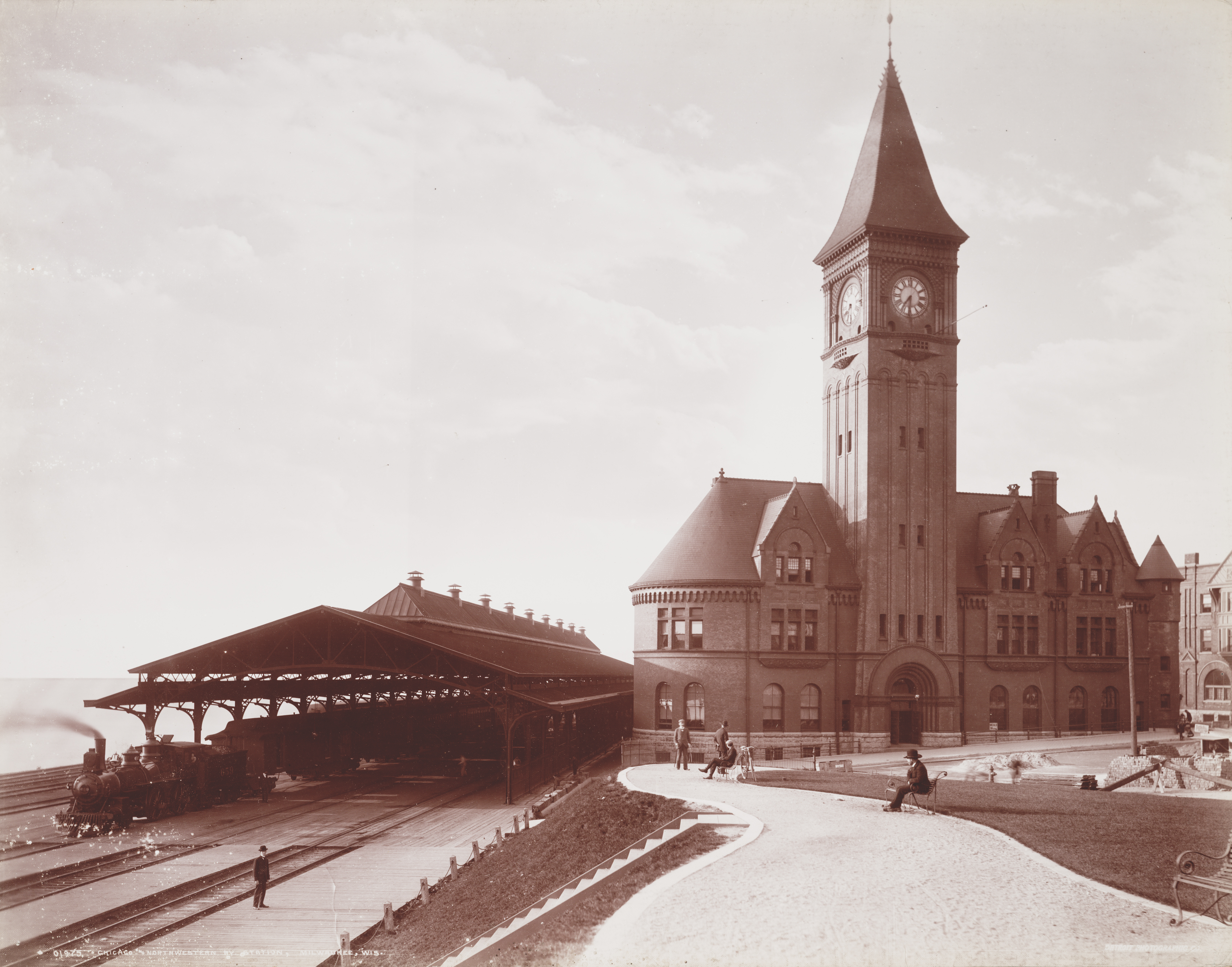
Milwaukee's Lake Front Depot in 1898

Schurz was referring to the various clubs and societies Germans developed in Milwaukee. The American Turners established its own Normal College for teachers of physical education and the German-English Academy. Milwaukee's German element is still strongly present; the city celebrates its German culture by annually hosting a German Fest in July and an Oktoberfest in October. Milwaukee boasts a number of German restaurants, as well as a traditional German beer hall. A German language immersion school is offered for children in grades K–5.

Although the German presence in Milwaukee after the Civil War remained strong and their largest wave of immigrants had yet to land, other groups also made their way to the city. Foremost among these were Polish immigrants. Because Milwaukee offered the Polish immigrants an abundance of low-paying entry-level jobs, it became home to one of the largest Polish-American communities. For many residents, Milwaukee's South Side is synonymous with the Polish community. Milwaukee County's Polish population of 30,000 in 1890 rose to 100,000 by 1915. St. Stanislaus Catholic Church and the surrounding neighborhood was the center of Polish life in Milwaukee. As the Polish community surrounding St. Stanislaus continued to grow, Mitchell Street became known as the "Polish Grand Avenue". As Mitchell Street grew more dense, the Polish population started moving south to the Lincoln Village neighborhood, home to the Basilica of St. Josaphat and Kosciuszko Park. Other Polish communities started on the East Side of Milwaukee. Jones Island was a major commercial fishing center settled mostly by Kashubians and other Poles from around the Baltic Sea. Milwaukee has the fifth-largest Polish population in the U.S. at 45,467, ranking behind New York City (211,203), Chicago (165,784), Los Angeles (60,316) and Philadelphia (52,648). The city holds Polish Fest, an annual celebration of Polish culture and cuisine.

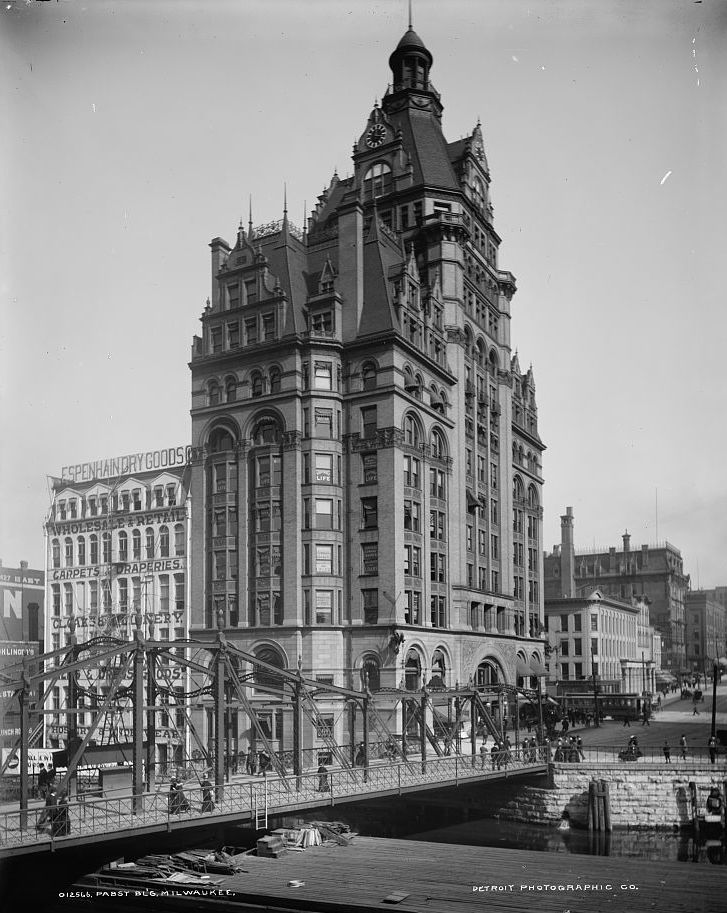
Wisconsin Street and the Pabst Building in the early 20th century

In addition to the Germans and Poles, Milwaukee received a large influx of other European immigrants from Lithuania, Italy, Ireland, France, Russia, Bohemia, and Sweden, who included Jews, Lutherans, and Catholics. Italian Americans total 16,992 in the city, but in Milwaukee County, they number at 38,286. The largest Italian-American festival in the area, Festa Italiana, is held in the city, while Irishfest is the largest Irish-American festival in southeast Wisconsin. By 1910, Milwaukee shared the distinction with New York City of having the largest percentage of foreign-born residents in the United States. In 1910, European descendants ("Whites") represented 99.7% of the city's total population of 373,857. Milwaukee has a strong Greek Orthodox Community, many of whom attend the Annunciation Greek Orthodox Church on Milwaukee's northwest side, designed by Wisconsin-born architect Frank Lloyd Wright. Milwaukee has a sizable Croatian population, with Croatian churches and their own historic and successful soccer club The Croatian Eagles at Croatian Park in Franklin, Wisconsin.

Milwaukee also has a large Serbian population, who have developed Serbian restaurants, a Serbian K–8 School, and Serbian churches, along with an American Serb Hall. The American Serb Hall in Milwaukee is known for its Friday fish fries and popular events. Many U.S. presidents have visited Milwaukee's Serb Hall in the past. The Bosnian population is growing in Milwaukee as well due to late-20th-century immigration after the war in Bosnia-Herzegovina.

During this time, a small community of African Americans migrated from the South in the Great Migration. They settled near each other, forming a community that came to be known as Bronzeville. As industry boomed, more migrants came, and African-American influence grew in Milwaukee.

In 1892, Whitefish Bay, South Milwaukee, and Wauwatosa were incorporated. They were followed by Cudahy (1895), North Milwaukee (1897) and East Milwaukee, later known as Shorewood, in 1900. In the early 20th century, West Allis (1902), and West Milwaukee (1906) were added, which completed the first generation of "inner-ring" suburbs.

=== 20th century to present ===
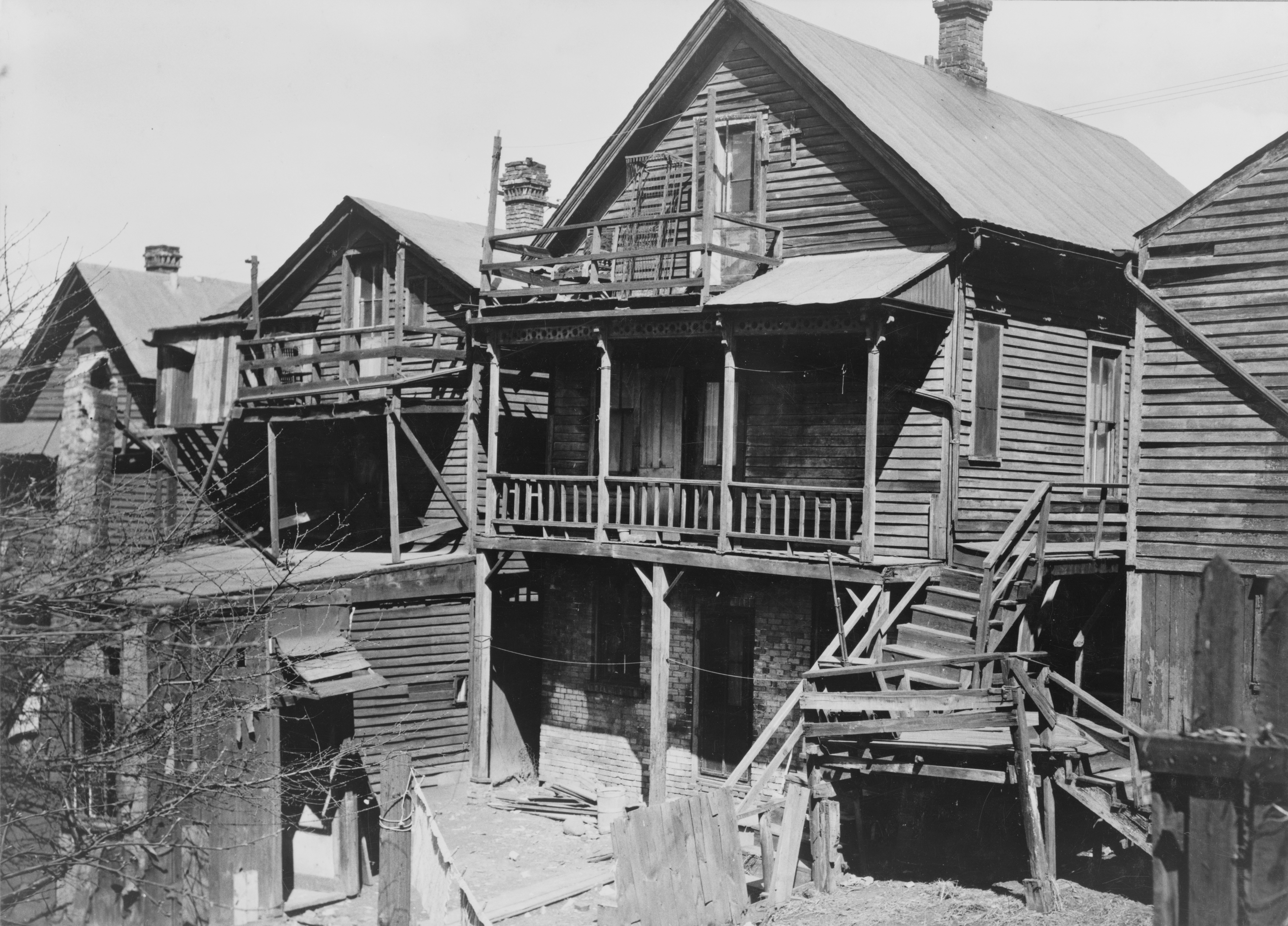
A slum area of Milwaukee from 1936

In 1910, the seven most spoken languages in Milwaukee were German (167,108, or 44.7% of the population), English (104,892, or 28.06%), (Note: Sum of all 25,089 respondents "of foreign stock" (either foreign-born or with at least one foreign-born parent) who listed "White" as their ethnicity and "English" as their mother tongue, all 78,823 who listed "White" as their ethnicity and were native-born to native-born parents, and all 980 respondents who listed "Negro" as their ethnicity.) Polish (58,109, or 15.54%), Yiddish (7,757, or 2.07%), Czech (6,370, or 1.7%), Norwegian (5,077, or 1.36%), and Italian (4,837, or 1.29%). By 2000, the seven most spoken languages in Milwaukee were English (462,415, or 84.28% of the population), Spanish (55,245, or 10.07%), Hmong (7,340, or 1.34%), German (4,430, or 0.81%), French (2,240, or 0.41%), Polish (2,225, or 0.41%), and Arabic (1,555, or 0.28%).

During the first sixty years of the 20th century, Milwaukee was the major city in which the Socialist Party of America earned the highest votes. Milwaukee elected three mayors who ran on the ticket of the Socialist Party: Emil Seidel (1910–1912), Daniel Hoan (1916–1940), and Frank Zeidler (1948–1960), with Victor L. Berger elected as the first socialist congressman in 1910. Often referred to as "Sewer Socialists", the Milwaukee Socialists were characterized by their practical approach to government and labor. On October 14, 1912, former president Theodore Roosevelt, who ran for a third term under his progressive, Bull Moose Party, survived an assassination attempt by salonkeeper John Schrank, while making a speech at the Gilpatrick Hotel. On November 24, 1917, Milwaukee was the site of a terrorist explosion when a large black powder bomb exploded at the central police station at Oneida and Broadway. Nine members of the department were killed in the blast, along with a female civilian, Catherine Walker. It was suspected at the time that the bomb had been placed outside the church by anarchists, particularly the Galleanist faction led by adherents of Luigi Galleani. At the time, the bombing was the most fatal single event in national law enforcement history.

In the 1920s, Chicago gangster activity came north to Milwaukee during the Prohibition era. Al Capone, noted Chicago mobster, owned a home in the Milwaukee suburb Brookfield, where moonshine was made. The house still stands on a street named after Capone.

Between 1910 and 1930, the White community in Milwaukee grew from 372,809 (99.72%) to 568,807 (98.37%), the Black community grew from 980 (0.26%) to 7,501 (1.3%), the Mexican community grew from 0 (0%) to 1,479 (0.26%), and members of all other communities (like Native Americans or Chinese) grew from 68 (0.02%) to 462 (0.08%). However, the population of foreign-born Whites shrunk from 111,456 (29.81%) to 109,383 (18.92%) between 1910 and 1930. Over the next few decades, as restrictive immigration laws lessened European migration, African Americans from the Southeast and Mexicans migrated to the city and began to form ethnic enclaves. They arrived for jobs, filling positions in the manufacturing and agricultural sectors, and alleviating labor shortages induced by reduced European immigration and labor strikes.

In the mid-20th century, African Americans from Chicago moved to the North side of Milwaukee. Milwaukee has attracted a population of Russians and other Eastern Europeans who began migrating in the early 1900s and the 1980s. Many Hispanics of mostly Puerto Rican and Mexican heritage live on the south side of Milwaukee. In the 1930s the city was severely segregated via redlining. In 1960, African-American residents made up 15 percent of Milwaukee's population, yet the city was still among the most segregated of that time. As of 2019, at least three out of four black residents in Milwaukee would have to move to create racially integrated neighborhoods.

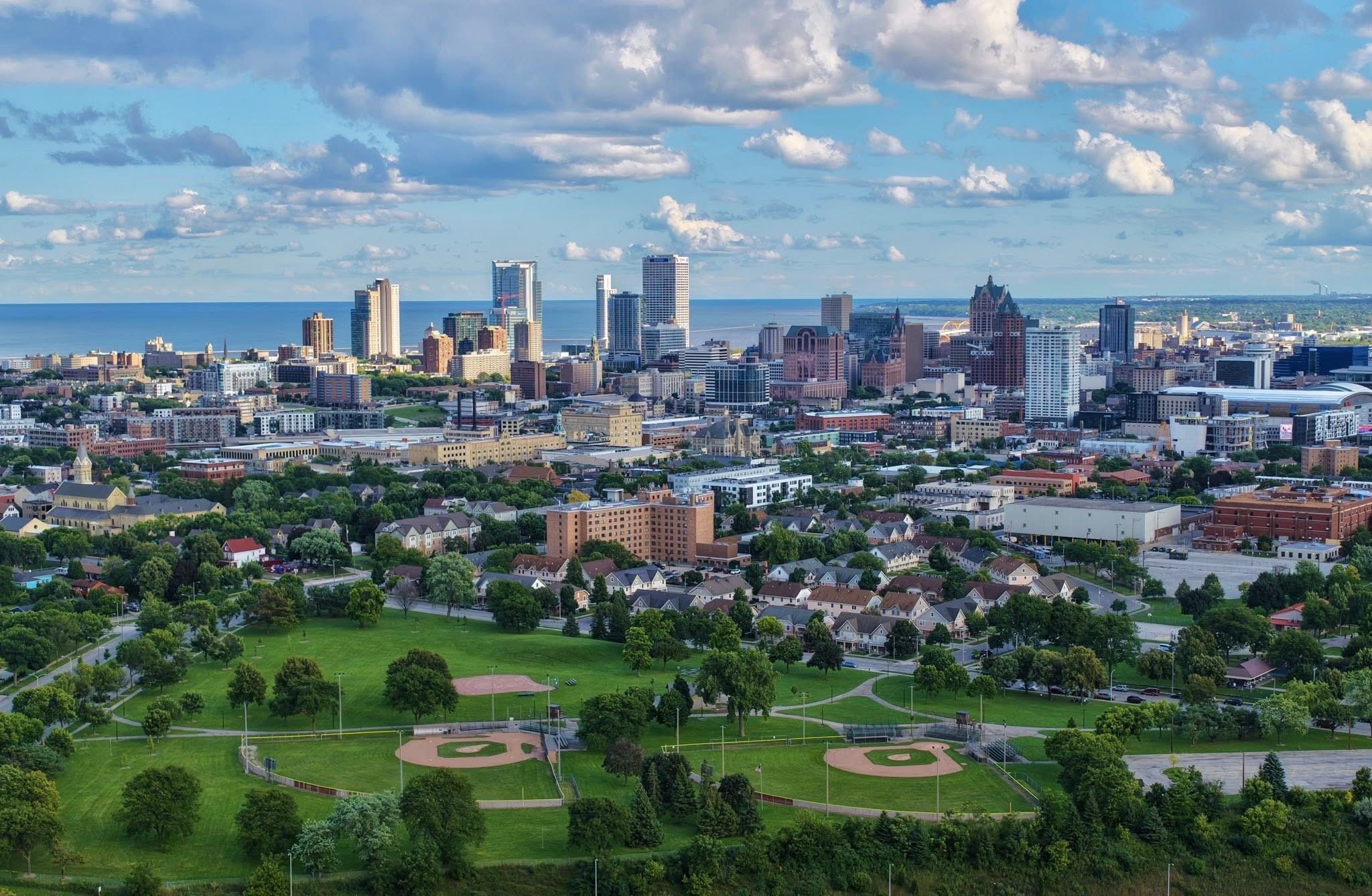
View of Downtown Milwaukee looking Southeast towards Lake Michigan from Northwest

Milwaukee's population peaked at 741,324 in 1960, where the Census Bureau reported the city's population as 91.1% white and 8.4% black. By the late 1960s, Milwaukee's population had started to decline as people moved to suburbs, aided by ease of highways and offering the advantages of less crime, new housing, and lower taxation. Milwaukee had a population of 594,833 by 2010, while the population of the overall metropolitan area increased. Given its large immigrant population and historic neighborhoods, Milwaukee avoided the severe declines of some of its fellow "Rust Belt" cities.

In 1993, Milwaukee experienced a massive outbreak of Cryptosporidium protozoan in much of the water supply, affecting more than 400,000 residents, and eroding public trust in the public water supply for nearly a decade.

Since the 1980s, the city has begun to make strides in improving its economy, neighborhoods, and image, resulting in the revitalization of neighborhoods such as the Historic Third Ward, Lincoln Village, the East Side, and more recently Walker's Point and Bay View, along with attracting new businesses to its downtown area. These efforts have substantially slowed the population decline and have stabilized many parts of Milwaukee. Largely through its efforts to preserve its history, Milwaukee was named one of the "Dozen Distinctive Destinations" by the National Trust for Historic Preservation in 2006. Historic Milwaukee walking tours provide a guided tour of Milwaukee's historic districts, including topics on Milwaukee's architectural heritage, its glass skywalk system, and the Milwaukee Riverwalk.

In the 2010s and 2020s, Milwaukee underwent several development projects, including the opening of the Bradley Symphony Center. The Hop streetcar system began operation in 2018, and the Fiserv Forum opened the same year.

The city was hit by widespread flash flooding on August 9–10, 2025, after the second-most recorded rain over a two-day period in the city's history.

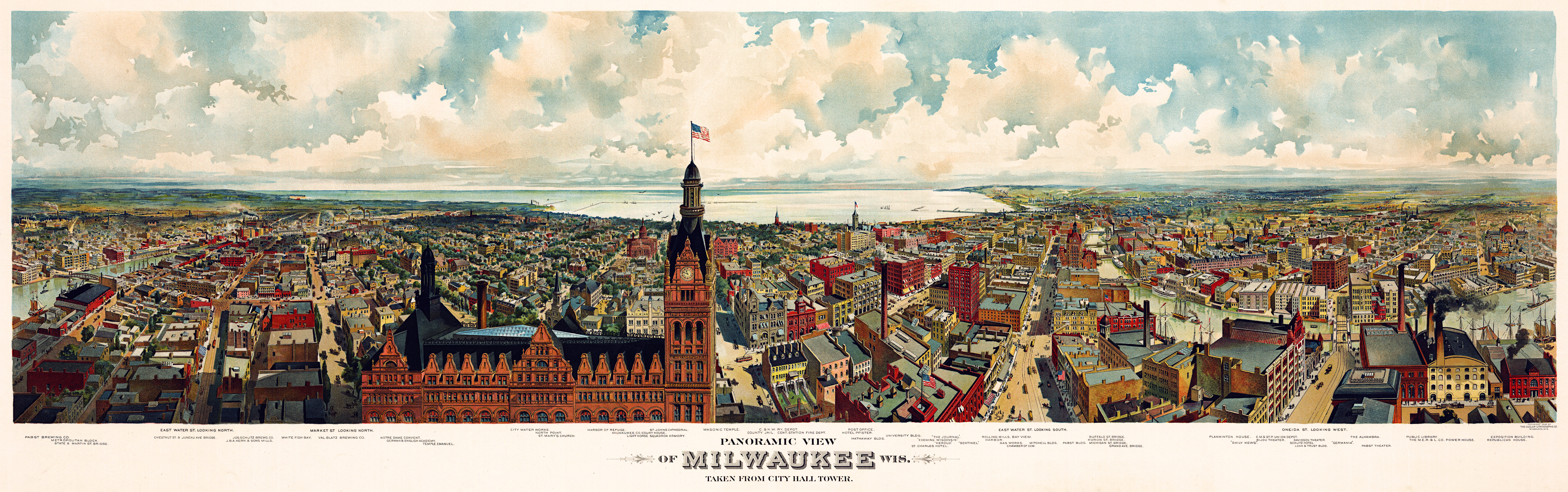
Panorama map of Milwaukee, with a view of the City Hall tower, c. 1898

== Geography ==
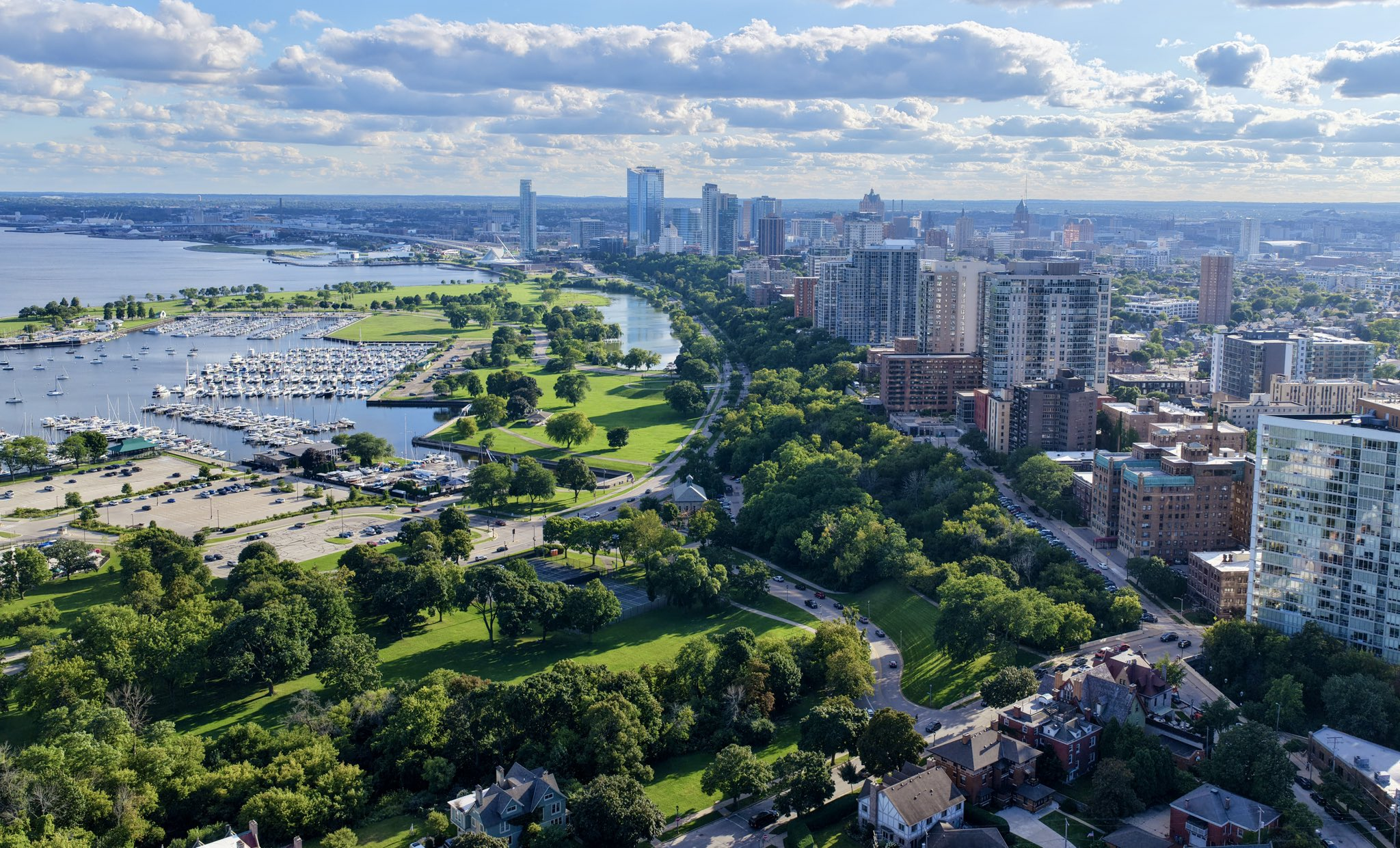
Looking south from Milwaukee's Lower East Side, including Yankee Hill, Juneau Town, and downtown

Milwaukee lies along the shores and bluffs of Lake Michigan at the confluence of three rivers: the Menomonee, the Kinnickinnic, and the Milwaukee. Smaller rivers, such as the Root River and Lincoln Creek, also flow through the city.

Milwaukee's terrain is sculpted by the glacier path and includes steep bluffs along Lake Michigan that begin approximately one mile (1.6 km) north of downtown. In addition, 30 miles (48 km) west of Milwaukee is the Kettle Moraine and lake country that provides an industrial landscape combined with inland lakes.

According to the United States Census Bureau, the city has a total area of 96.80 square miles (250.71 km^{2}), of which 96.12 square miles (248.95 km^{2}) is land and 0.68 square miles (1.76 km^{2}) is water. The city is overwhelmingly (99.89% of its area) in Milwaukee County, but there are two tiny unpopulated portions that extend into neighboring counties. (Note: The part in Washington County is bordered by the southeast corner of Germantown, while the part in Waukesha County is bordered by the southeast corner of Menomonee Falls, north of the village of Butler. Both areas were annexed to Milwaukee for industrial reasons; the Waukesha County portion contains a Cargill plant for Ambrosia Chocolate (known as "the Ambrosia triangle"), while the Washington County portion contains a Waste Management facility.)

=== Cityscape ===
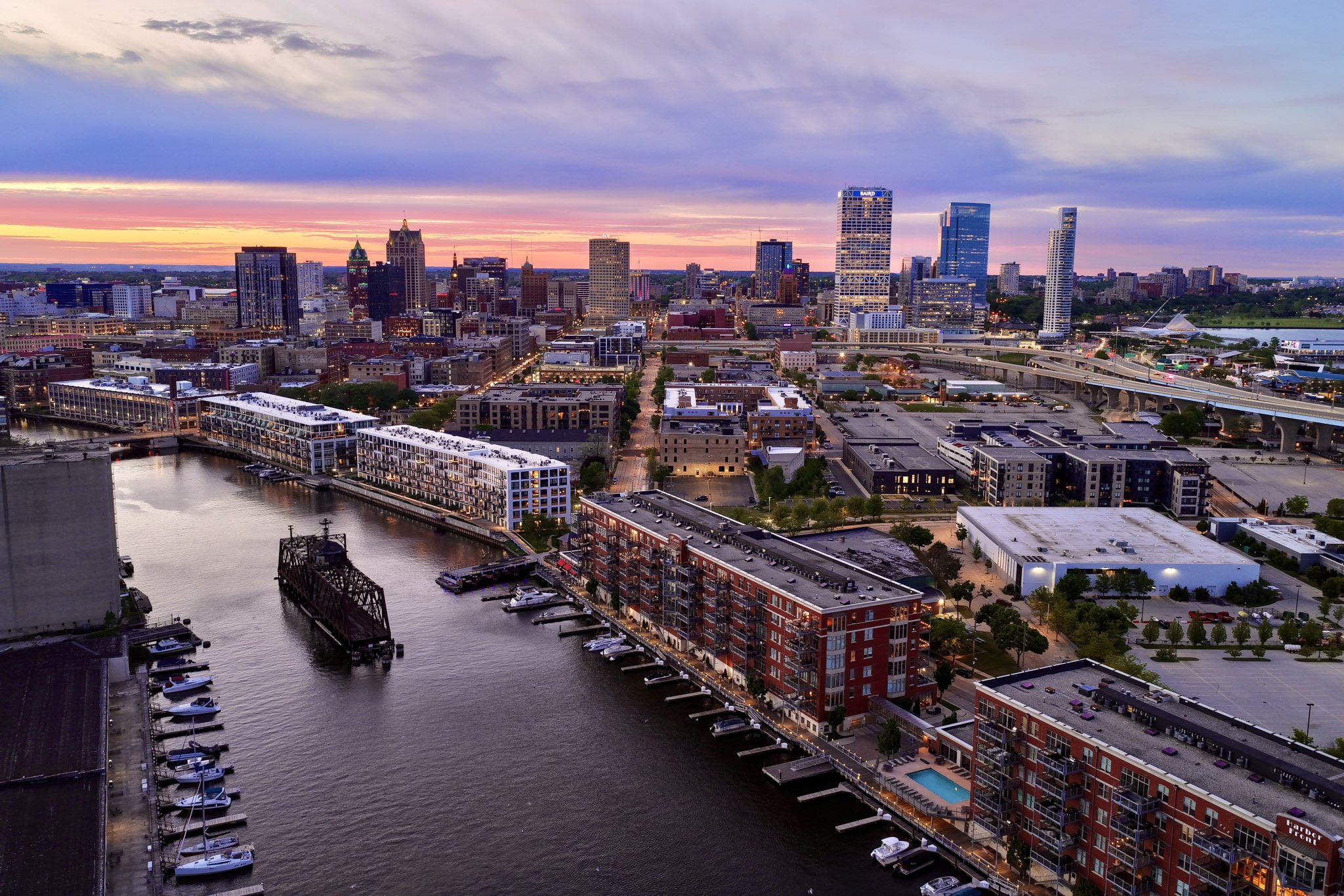
Aerial view of Milwaukee from Historic Third Ward and Milwaukee River

North–south streets are numbered, and east–west streets are named. However, north–south streets east of 1st Street are named, like east–west streets. The north–south numbering line is along the Menomonee River (east of Hawley Road) and Fairview Avenue/Golfview Parkway (west of Hawley Road), with the east–west numbering line defined along 1st Street (north of Oklahoma Avenue) and Chase/Howell Avenue (south of Oklahoma Avenue). This numbering system is also used to the north by Mequon in Ozaukee County, and by some Waukesha County communities.

Milwaukee is crossed by Interstate 43 and Interstate 94, which come together downtown at the Marquette Interchange. The Interstate 894 bypass (which as of May 2015 also contains Interstate 41) runs through portions of the city's southwest side, and Interstate 794 comes out of the Marquette interchange eastbound, bends south along the lakefront and crosses the harbor over the Hoan Bridge, then ends near the Bay View neighborhood and becomes the "Lake Parkway" (WIS-794).

One of the distinctive traits of Milwaukee's residential areas are the neighborhoods full of so-called Polish flats. These are two-family homes with separate entrances, but with the units stacked one on top of another instead of side-by-side. This arrangement enables a family of limited means to purchase both a home and a modestly priced rental apartment unit. Since Polish-American immigrants to the area prized land ownership, this solution, which was prominent in their areas of settlement within the city, came to be associated with them.

The tallest building in the city is the U.S. Bank Center in downtown Milwaukee, at 601 feet ( 183m ) tall, completed in 1973. In 2024 Architectural Digest, a prominent design publication, rated Milwaukee's skyline as the 15th most beautiful skyline in the world.

=== Climate ===
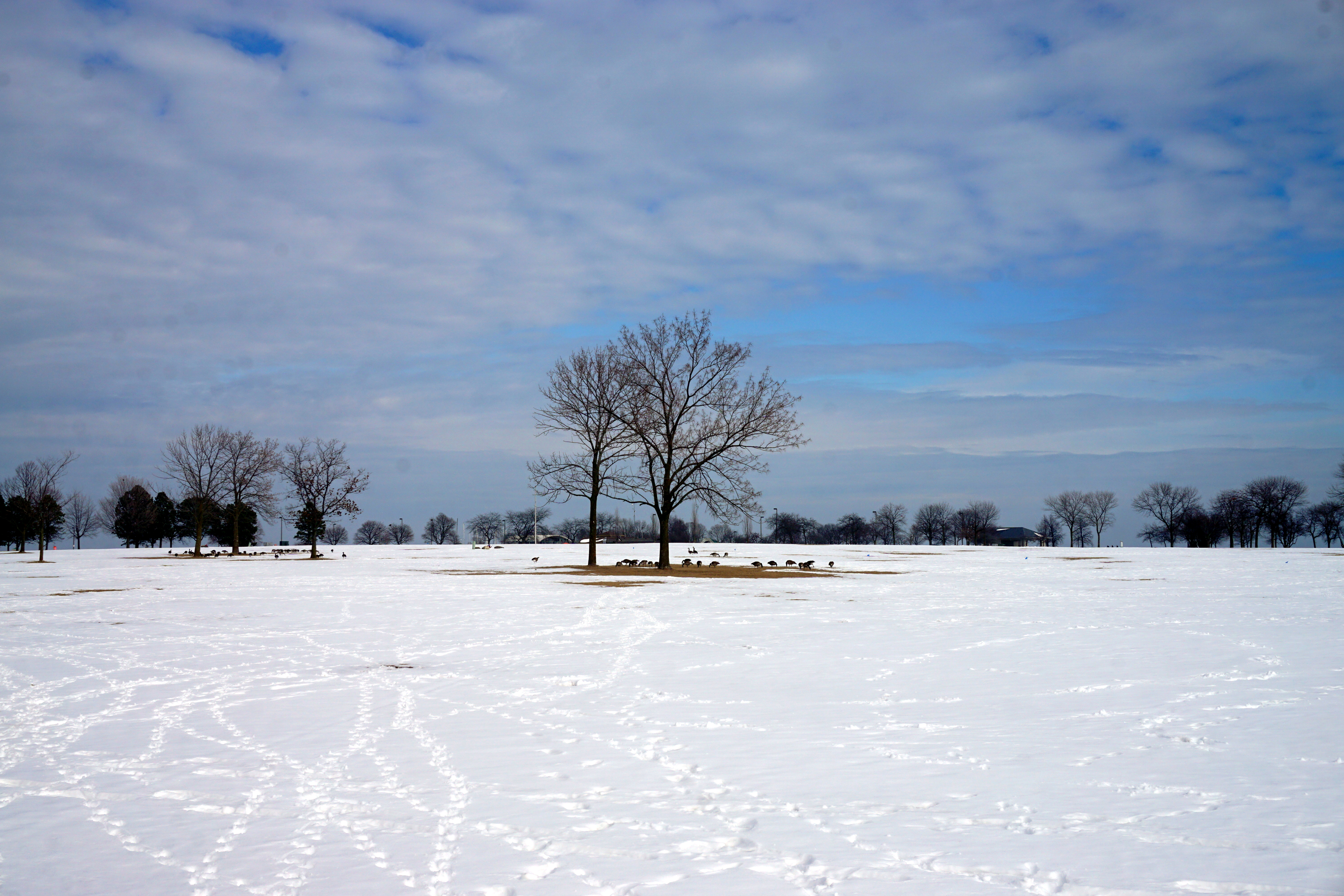
Veterans Park in winter

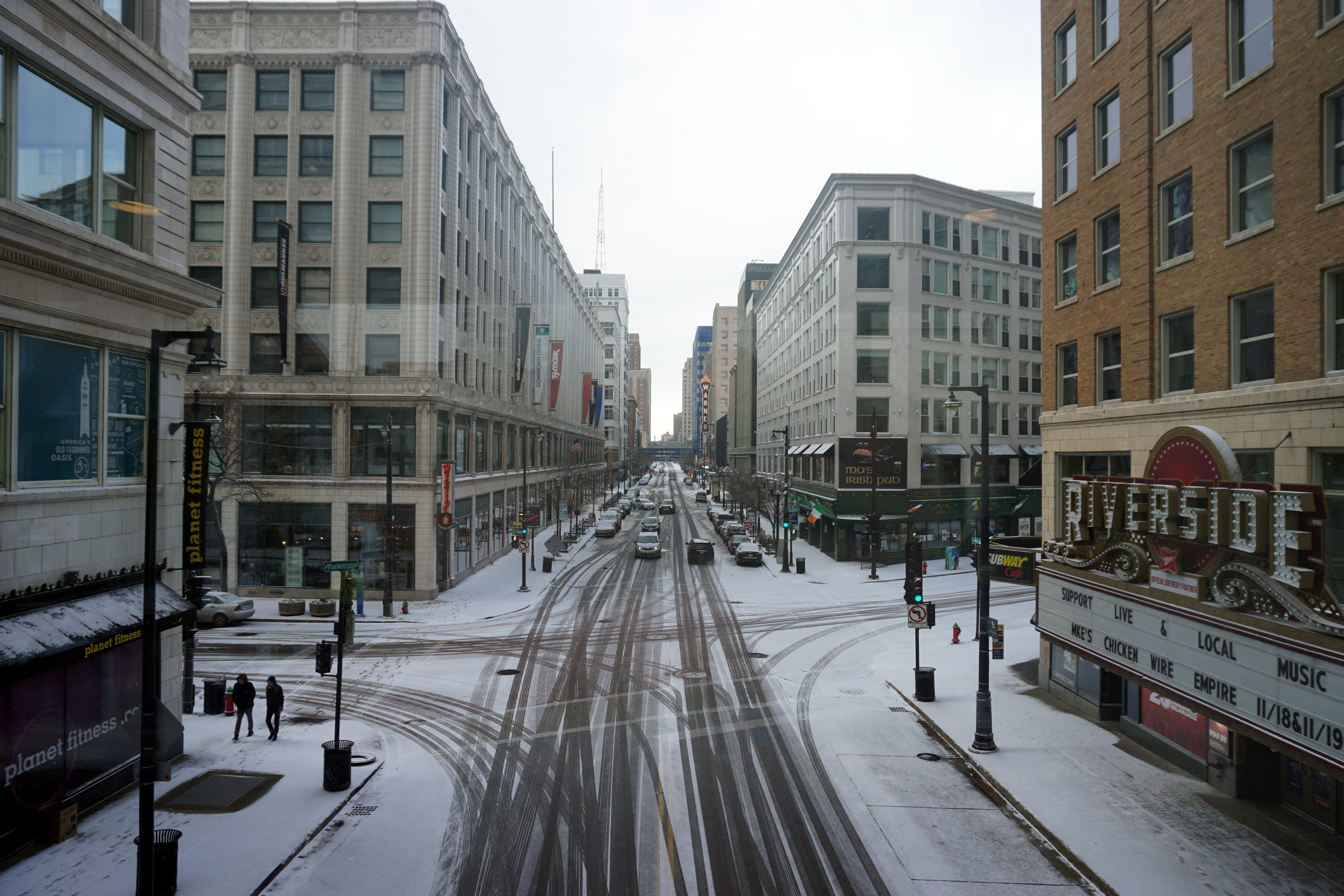
West Wisconsin Avenue from the Milwaukee Skywalk

Milwaukee's location in the Great Lakes Region often has rapidly changing weather, producing a humid continental climate (Köppen Dfa), with cold, snowy winters, and hot, humid summers. The warmest month of the year is July, with a mean temperature of 73.3 °F (22.9 °C), while January is the coldest month, with a mean temperature of 24.0 °F (−4.4 °C).

Because of Milwaukee's proximity to Lake Michigan, a convection current forms around mid-afternoon in light wind, resulting in the so-called "lake breeze" – a smaller scale version of the more common sea breeze. The lake breeze is most common between March and July. This onshore flow causes cooler temperatures to move inland usually 5 to 15 miles (8 to 24 km), with much warmer conditions persisting further inland. Because Milwaukee's official climate site, Milwaukee Mitchell International Airport, is only 3 miles (4.8 km) from the lake, seasonal temperature variations are less extreme than in many other locations of the Milwaukee metropolitan area.

As the sun sets, the convection current reverses and an offshore flow ensues causing a land breeze. After a land breeze develops, warmer temperatures flow east toward the lakeshore, sometimes causing high temperatures during the late evening. The lake breeze is not a daily occurrence and will not usually form if a southwest, west, or northwest wind generally exceeds 15 mph (24 km/h). The lake moderates cold air outbreaks along the lakeshore during winter months.

Aside from the lake's influence, overnight lows in downtown Milwaukee year-round are often much warmer than suburban locations because of the urban heat island effect. Onshore winds elevate daytime relative humidity levels in Milwaukee as compared to inland locations nearby.

Thunderstorms in the region can be dangerous and damaging, bringing hail and high winds. In rare instances, they can bring a tornado. However, almost all summer rainfall in the city is brought by these storms. In spring and fall, longer events of prolonged, lighter rain bring most of the precipitation. A moderate snow cover can be seen on or linger for many winter days, but even during meteorological winter, on average, over 40% of days see less than 1 inch (2.5 cm) on the ground.

Milwaukee tends to experience highs that are 90 °F (32 °C) or above on about nine days per year, and lows at or below 0 °F (−18 °C) on six to seven nights. Extremes range from 105 °F (41 °C) set on July 24, 1934, down to −26 °F (−32 °C) on both January 17, 1982, and February 4, 1996. The 1982 event, also known as Cold Sunday, featured temperatures as low as −40 °F (−40 °C) in some of the suburbs as little as 10 miles (16 km) to the north of Milwaukee.

Climate data for Milwaukee (Mitchell International Airport), 1991–2020 normals, (Note: Mean monthly maxima and minima (i.e. the expected highest and lowest temperature readings at any point during the year or given month) calculated based on data at said location from 1991 to 2020.) extremes 1871–present (Note: Records kept January 1871 to February 1941 at the Weather Bureau Office and at General Mitchell Int'l since March 1941. For more information, see Threadex)
| Month | Jan | Feb | Mar | Apr | May | Jun | Jul | Aug | Sep | Oct | Nov | Dec | Year |
|---|---|---|---|---|---|---|---|---|---|---|---|---|---|
| Record high °F (°C) | 63 (17) | 74 (23) | 84 (29) | 91 (33) | 95 (35) | 104 (40) | 105 (41) | 103 (39) | 99 (37) | 89 (32) | 77 (25) | 68 (20) | 105 (41) |
| Mean maximum °F (°C) | 50.5 (10.3) | 52.8 (11.6) | 67.1 (19.5) | 79.5 (26.4) | 85.8 (29.9) | 92.0 (33.3) | 93.4 (34.1) | 91.7 (33.2) | 88.1 (31.2) | 79.9 (26.6) | 65.5 (18.6) | 53.4 (11.9) | 95.0 (35.0) |
| Mean daily maximum °F (°C) | 30.9 (−0.6) | 34.2 (1.2) | 44.2 (6.8) | 54.7 (12.6) | 66.5 (19.2) | 76.8 (24.9) | 81.9 (27.7) | 80.3 (26.8) | 73.5 (23.1) | 61.3 (16.3) | 47.8 (8.8) | 36.1 (2.3) | 57.3 (14.1) |
| Daily mean °F (°C) | 24.0 (−4.4) | 27.1 (−2.7) | 36.4 (2.4) | 46.3 (7.9) | 57.1 (13.9) | 67.6 (19.8) | 73.3 (22.9) | 72.3 (22.4) | 65.0 (18.3) | 53.0 (11.7) | 40.4 (4.7) | 29.5 (−1.4) | 49.3 (9.6) |
| Mean daily minimum °F (°C) | 17.2 (−8.2) | 20.0 (−6.7) | 28.7 (−1.8) | 37.8 (3.2) | 47.8 (8.8) | 58.4 (14.7) | 64.7 (18.2) | 64.2 (17.9) | 56.4 (13.6) | 44.7 (7.1) | 33.1 (0.6) | 23.0 (−5.0) | 41.3 (5.2) |
| Mean minimum °F (°C) | −4.5 (−20.3) | 1.0 (−17.2) | 10.6 (−11.9) | 25.6 (−3.6) | 36.3 (2.4) | 45.7 (7.6) | 54.7 (12.6) | 55.0 (12.8) | 42.3 (5.7) | 30.6 (−0.8) | 17.9 (−7.8) | 3.2 (−16.0) | −7.9 (−22.2) |
| Record low °F (°C) | −26 (−32) | −26 (−32) | −10 (−23) | 12 (−11) | 21 (−6) | 33 (1) | 40 (4) | 42 (6) | 28 (−2) | 15 (−9) | −14 (−26) | −22 (−30) | −26 (−32) |
| Average precipitation inches (mm) | 1.79 (45) | 1.69 (43) | 2.20 (56) | 3.86 (98) | 3.54 (90) | 4.38 (111) | 3.40 (86) | 3.65 (93) | 3.16 (80) | 2.78 (71) | 2.24 (57) | 1.88 (48) | 34.57 (878) |
| Average snowfall inches (cm) | 14.9 (38) | 11.8 (30) | 6.7 (17) | 2.1 (5.3) | 0.0 (0.0) | 0.0 (0.0) | 0.0 (0.0) | 0.0 (0.0) | 0.0 (0.0) | 0.3 (0.76) | 2.5 (6.4) | 10.4 (26) | 48.7 (124) |
| Average extreme snow depth inches (cm) | 8.6 (22) | 7.1 (18) | 5.3 (13) | 0.9 (2.3) | 0.0 (0.0) | 0.0 (0.0) | 0.0 (0.0) | 0.0 (0.0) | 0.0 (0.0) | 0.1 (0.25) | 1.1 (2.8) | 5.6 (14) | 12.5 (32) |
| Average precipitation days (≥ 0.01 in) | 11.4 | 10.0 | 10.7 | 12.2 | 11.7 | 11.1 | 9.5 | 9.5 | 8.6 | 10.3 | 10.2 | 10.3 | 125.5 |
| Average snowy days (≥ 0.1 in) | 10.0 | 8.1 | 5.0 | 1.8 | 0.0 | 0.0 | 0.0 | 0.0 | 0.0 | 0.3 | 2.6 | 7.3 | 35.1 |
| Average relative humidity (%) | 72.3 | 71.9 | 71.4 | 68.5 | 68.5 | 69.7 | 71.5 | 74.9 | 75.4 | 72.5 | 74.5 | 75.9 | 72.3 |
| Average dew point °F (°C) | 11.7 (−11.3) | 15.4 (−9.2) | 24.6 (−4.1) | 33.6 (0.9) | 43.7 (6.5) | 54.3 (12.4) | 60.6 (15.9) | 60.4 (15.8) | 53.4 (11.9) | 41.4 (5.2) | 30.4 (−0.9) | 18.3 (−7.6) | 37.3 (3.0) |
| Mean monthly sunshine hours | 140.2 | 151.5 | 185.4 | 213.5 | 275.5 | 304.5 | 321.1 | 281.2 | 215.1 | 178.0 | 112.8 | 104.8 | 2,483.6 |
| Percentage possible sunshine | 48 | 51 | 50 | 53 | 61 | 66 | 69 | 65 | 57 | 52 | 38 | 37 | 56 |
| Average ultraviolet index | 1 | 2 | 4 | 5 | 7 | 8 | 8 | 8 | 6 | 3 | 2 | 1 | 5 |
Source 1: NOAA (relative humidity, dew point, and sun 1961–1990)
Source 2: Weather Atlas

Climate data for Milwaukee
| Month | Jan | Feb | Mar | Apr | May | Jun | Jul | Aug | Sep | Oct | Nov | Dec | Year |
|---|---|---|---|---|---|---|---|---|---|---|---|---|---|
| Average sea temperature °F (°C) | 37.5 (3.0) | 36.0 (2.2) | 36.2 (2.4) | 38.2 (3.4) | 40.8 (4.9) | 53.3 (11.8) | 67.9 (19.9) | 71.9 (22.2) | 66.9 (19.4) | 54.9 (12.8) | 46.9 (8.3) | 40.1 (4.5) | 49.2 (9.6) |
Source: Weather Atlas

==== Climate change ====
According to the United States' Environmental Protection Agency, Milwaukee is threatened by ongoing climate change which is warming the planet. These risks include worsened heat waves because many of its residents do not possess air conditioners, concerns about the water quality of Lake Michigan, and increased chances of flooding from intense rainstorms. In 2018, Milwaukee mayor Tom Barrett announced that the city would uphold its obligations under the Paris Agreement, despite the United States' withdrawal, and set a goal moving a quarter of the city's electricity sources to renewable energy by 2025. These have included expansions in the city's solar power-generating capacity and a wind turbine's installation near the Port of Milwaukee. Other actions being taken include local incentives for energy-saving upgrades to homes and businesses.

=== Water ===
In the 1990s and 2000s, Lake Michigan experienced large algae blooms, which can threaten aquatic life. Responding to this problem, in 2009 the city became an "Innovating City" in the Global Compact Cities Program. The Milwaukee Water Council was also formed in 2009. Its objectives were to "better understand the processes related to freshwater systems dynamics" and to develop "a policy and management program aimed at balancing the protection and utilization of freshwater". The strategy used the Circles of Sustainability method. Instead of treating the water quality problem as a single environmental issue, the Water Council draws on the Circles method to analyze the interconnection among ecological, economic, political and cultural factors. This holistic water treatment helped Milwaukee win the US Water Alliance's 2012 US Water Prize. In 2009 the University of Wisconsin-Milwaukee also established the University of Wisconsin–Milwaukee School of Freshwater Sciences, the first graduate school of limnology in the United States.

As of 2021, there are more than 3,000 drinking fountains in the Milwaukee Public School District; 183 had lead levels above 15 parts per billion (ppb). 15 ppb is the federal action level in which effort needs to be taken to lower these lead levels. In the city, more than 10% of children test positive for dangerous lead levels in their blood as of 2019.

== Demographics ==
Historical population
| Census | Pop. | Note | %± |
|---|---|---|---|
| 1840 | 1,700 | | — |
| 1850 | 20,061 | | 1,080.1% |
| 1860 | 45,246 | | 125.5% |
| 1870 | 71,440 | | 57.9% |
| 1880 | 115,587 | | 61.8% |
| 1890 | 204,468 | | 76.9% |
| 1900 | 285,315 | | 39.5% |
| 1910 | 373,857 | | 31.0% |
| 1920 | 457,147 | | 22.3% |
| 1930 | 578,249 | | 26.5% |
| 1940 | 587,472 | | 1.6% |
| 1950 | 637,392 | | 8.5% |
| 1960 | 741,324 | | 16.3% |
| 1970 | 717,099 | | −3.3% |
| 1980 | 636,212 | | −11.3% |
| 1990 | 628,088 | | −1.3% |
| 2000 | 596,974 | | −5.0% |
| 2010 | 594,833 | | −0.4% |
| 2020 | 577,222 | | −3.0% |
| 2025 (est.) | 562,407 | ▼ | −2.6% |
U.S. Decennial Census; 2010–2020

Milwaukee is the 31st-most populous city in the United States, and anchors the 39th-most populous metropolitan statistical area in the US. Its combined statistical area population makes it the 29th-most populous in the US. The city's population has dropped at every census count since 1970. In 2012, Milwaukee was listed as a gamma city by the Globalization and World Cities Research Network.

=== 2020 census ===
In the 2020 United States census, the population was 577,222. The population density was 6,001.2 inhabitants per square mile (2,317.1/km^{2}). There were 257,723 housing units at an average density of 2,679.5 per square mile (1,034.6/km^{2}). Ethnically, the population was 20.1% Hispanic or Latino of any race. When grouping both Hispanic and non-Hispanic people together by race, the city was 38.6% Black or African American, 36.1% White, 5.2% Asian, 0.9% Native American, 9.0% from other races, and 10.1% from two or more races.

The 2020 census population of the city included 1,198 people incarcerated in adult correctional facilities and 9,625 people in university student housing.

In American Community Survey estimates for 2016–2020, the median household income was $43,125, and the median family income was $51,170. Male full-time worker median income was $42,859, versus $37,890 for female workers. The per capita income for the city was $24,167. About 19.6% of families and 24.6% of the population were below the poverty line, including 35.1% of those under age 18 and 14.5% of those age 65 or over. Of the population age 25 and over, 84.4% were high school graduates or higher and 24.6% had a bachelor's degree or higher.

=== Racial and ethnic groups ===
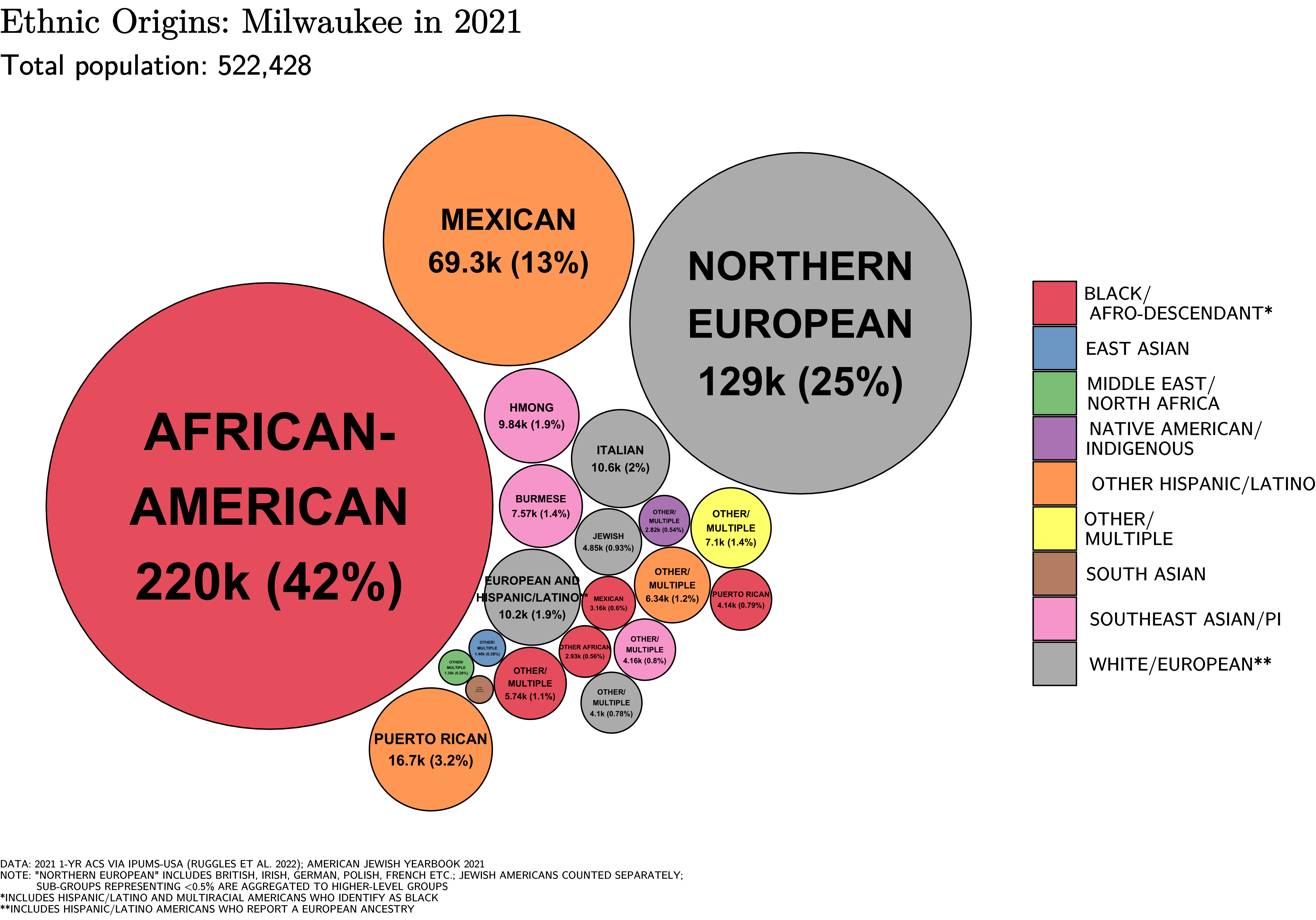
Ethnic origins in Milwaukee

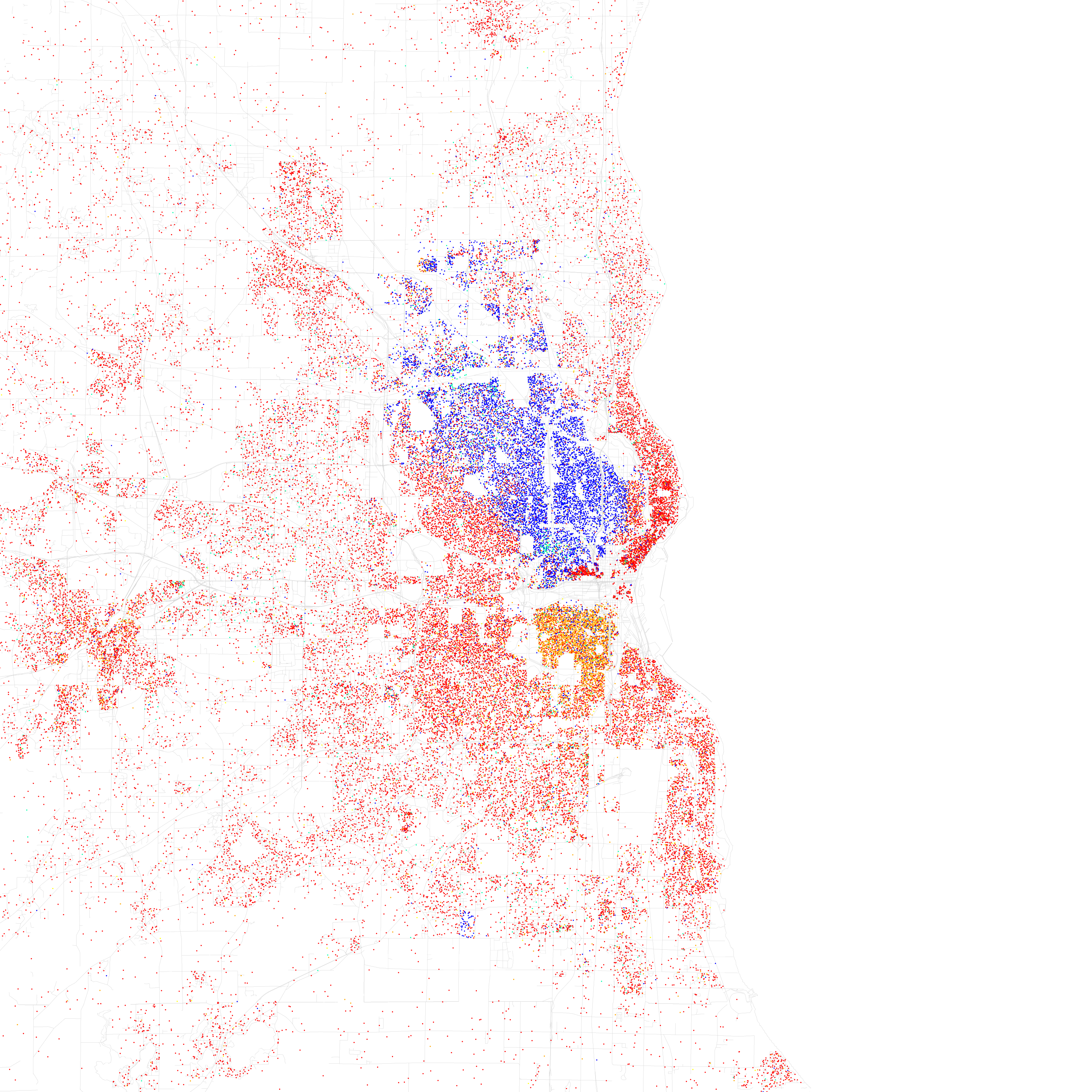
A racial distribution map of Milwaukee, 2010 U.S. Census. Each dot is 25 people: ⬤ White ⬤ Black ⬤ Asian ⬤ Hispanic ⬤ Other

Racial and ethnic composition as of the 2020 census
| Race or Ethnicity (NH = Non-Hispanic) | Race Alone | Total (Note: The total for each race includes those who reported that race alone or in combination with other races. People who reported a combination of multiple races may be counted multiple times, so the sum of all percentages will exceed 100%.) |
|---|---|---|
| Black or African American (NH) | 37.8% | 40.1% |
| White (NH) | 32.3% | 35.4% |
| Hispanic or Latino (Note: Hispanic and Latino origins are separate from race in the U.S. Census. The Census does not distinguish between Latino origins alone or in combination. This row counts Hispanics and Latinos of any race.) | — | 20.1% |
| Asian (NH) | 5.2% | 5.8% |
| Native American (NH) | 0.4% | 1.4% |
| Pacific Islander (NH) | 0.03% | 0.10% |
| Other | 0.5% | 1.0% |

In the 2010 Census, 44.8% of the population was White (37.0% non-Hispanic white), 40.0% was Black or African American, 0.8% American Indian and Alaska Native, 3.5% Asian, 3.4% from two or more races. 17.3% of Milwaukee's population was of Hispanic, Latino, or Spanish origin (they may be of any race) (11.7% Mexican, 4.1% Puerto Rican).

| Racial composition | 2020 | 2010 | 2000 | 1990 | 1980 |
|---|---|---|---|---|---|
| Black or African American | 37.8% | 39.2% | 36.9% | 30.2% | 22.9% |
| White (Non-Hispanic) | 32.3% | 37.0% | 45.5% | 60.8% | 71.4% |
| Hispanic or Latino | 20.1% | 17.3% | 12.0% | 6.3% | 4.2% |
| Asian | 5.2% | 3.5% | 2.9% | 1.8% | 0.7% |
| Mixed | 3.6% | 2.2% | | | |

In the 2006–2008 American Community Survey, 38.3% of Milwaukee's residents reported having African American ancestry and 20.8% reported German ancestry. Other significant population groups include Polish (8.8%), Irish (6.5%), Italian (3.6%), English (2.8%), and French (1.7%). According to the 2010 United States census, the largest Hispanic backgrounds in Milwaukee as of 2010 were: Mexican (69,680), Puerto Rican (24,672), Other Hispanic or Latino (3,808), Central American (1,962), South American (1,299), Cuban (866) and Dominican (720). Per the 2022 American Community Survey five-year estimates, the German American population was 87,601. Per the 2023 American Community Survey one-year estimates, the Mexican American population was 82,845, comprising over 60% of the city's Latino population.

in 2002, the Milwaukee metropolitan area was cited as being the most segregated in the U.S. in a Jet Magazine article. The source of this information was a segregation index developed in the mid-1950s and used since 1964. In 2003, a non-peer-reviewed study was conducted by hired researchers at the University of Wisconsin–Milwaukee which claimed Milwaukee is not "hypersegregated" and instead ranks as the 43rd most integrated city in America. According to research by demographer William H. Frey using the index of dissimilarity method and data from the 2010 United States census, Milwaukee has the highest level of black-white segregation of any of the 100 largest metropolitan areas in the United States. Through continued dialogue between Milwaukee's citizens, the city is trying to reduce racial tensions and the rate of segregation. With demographic changes in the wake of white flight, segregation in metropolitan Milwaukee is primarily in the suburbs rather than the city, as in the era of Father Groppi.

In 2015, Milwaukee was rated as the "worst city for black Americans" based on disparities in employment and income levels. The city's black population experiences high levels of incarceration and a severe educational achievement gap.

Per the 2022 American Community Survey five-year estimates, the Hmong American population was 11,469, numerically the largest Hmong population of any city in Wisconsin. In 2013, Mark Pfeifer, the editor of the Hmong Studies Journal, stated Hmong in Milwaukee had recently been moving to the northwest side of Milwaukee; they historically lived in the north and south areas of Milwaukee. The Hmong American Peace Academy/International Peace Academy, a K–12 school system in Milwaukee centered on the Hmong community, opened in 2004.

Polish people, Slavs, European Jews, people from the Mediterranean including Greeks, Italians, and Syrians immigrated to Milwaukee after 1880.

=== Religion ===
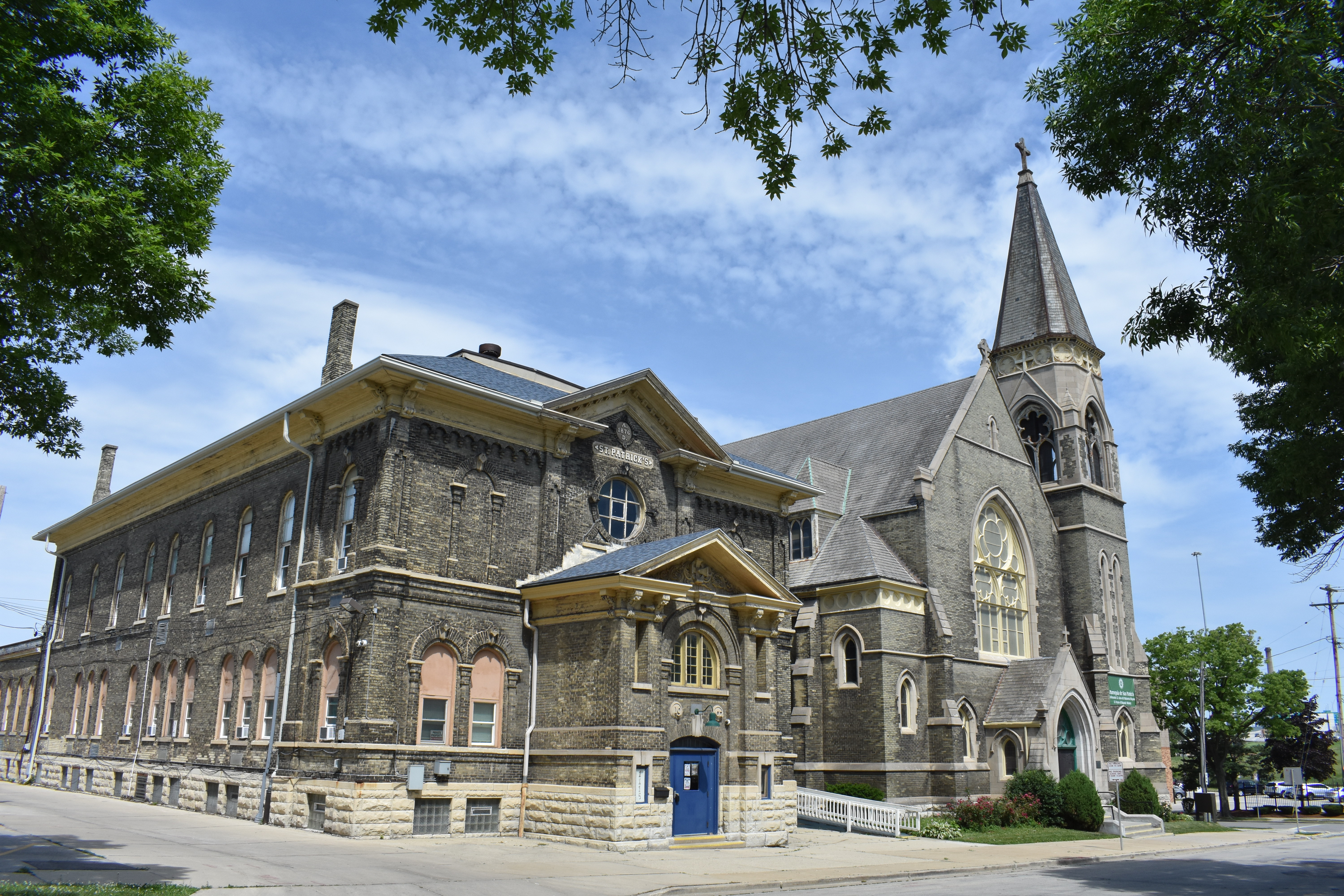
St. Patrick's Roman Catholic Church in Milwaukee's Walker's Point neighborhood.

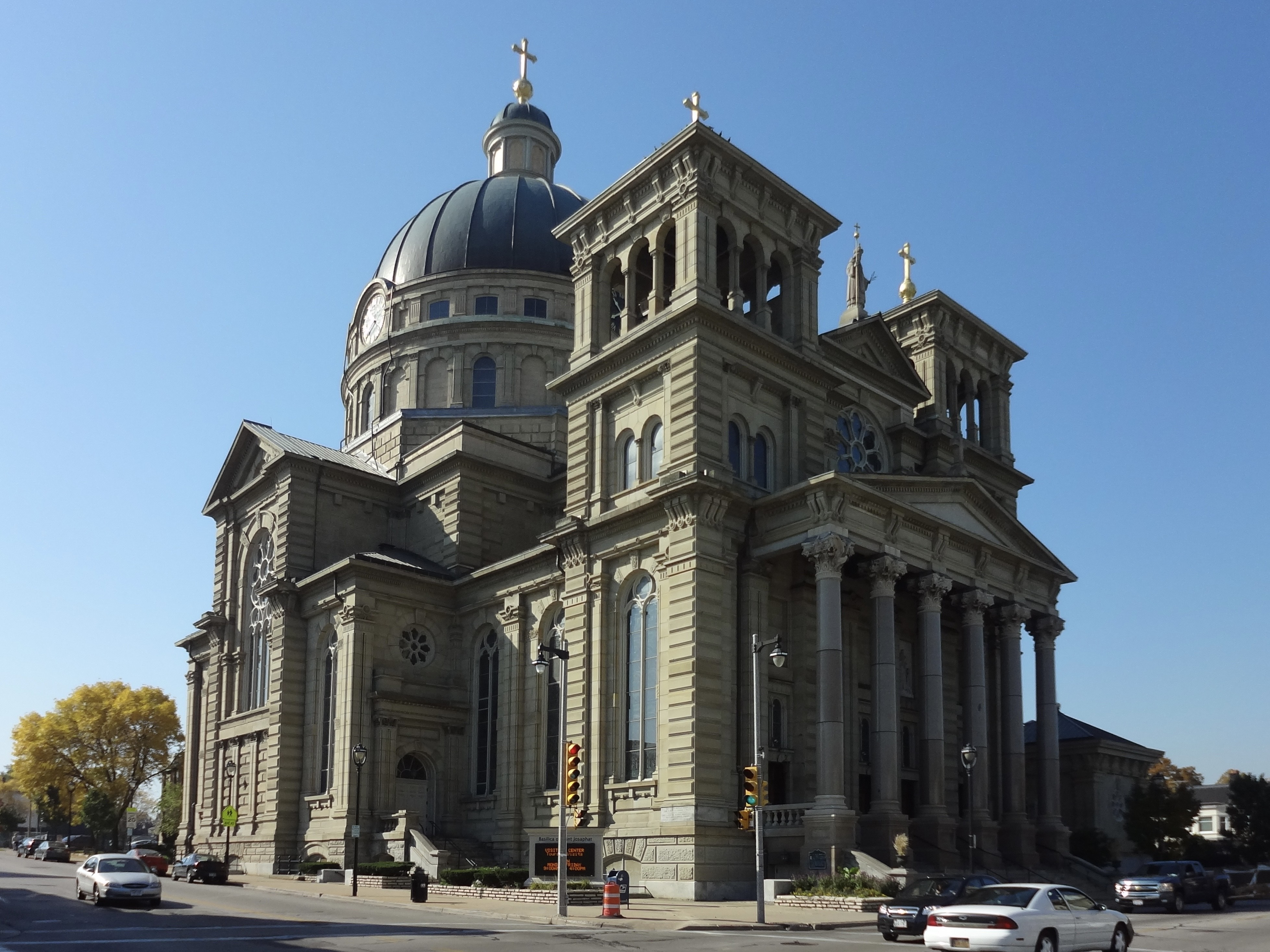
The Basilica of St. Josaphat in Milwaukee's historic Lincoln Village

In 2020, approximately 55.1% of residents in the Milwaukee area identified as religious adherents for the purposes of the census. Furthermore, 24.5% of the Milwaukee area population identified as Catholic, 9.1% as Lutheran, 1.0% as Methodist, and 0.4% as Jewish. The Milwaukee metro area contains the majority of the state's Jewish population, and has a long history of Jewish immigration from German-speaking and Eastern European countries.

The Roman Catholic Archdiocese of Milwaukee is headquartered in the city. The School Sisters of St. Francis have their motherhouse in Milwaukee, and several other religious orders have a significant presence in the area, including the Jesuits and Franciscans. Milwaukee, where Joseph Kentenich was exiled from 1952 to 1965, is the center for the Schoenstatt Movement in the US.

Milwaukee is home to numerous historic Catholic parishes, including the Cathedral of St. John the Evangelist. The oldest church building in Milwaukee is St. Joan of Arc Chapel, which was built c. 1420 in France and presently located on the Marquette University campus. The Basilica of St. Josaphat was the first church to be given basicila designation in Wisconsin and the third in the US. Holy Hill National Shrine of Mary, Help of Christians, northwest of Milwaukee in Hubertus, Wisconsin, was made a basilica in 2006.

The Episcopal Diocese of Milwaukee is based in the city, as are several Lutheran bodies, including the Greater Milwaukee Synod of the Evangelical Lutheran Church in America; the South Wisconsin District of the Lutheran Church – Missouri Synod, which operates Concordia University Wisconsin in the suburb of Mequon; and the Wisconsin Evangelical Lutheran Synod, which was founded in Milwaukee in 1850 and has headquarters in the suburb of Waukesha. Milwaukee Lutheran High School and Wisconsin Lutheran High School are the nation's oldest Lutheran high schools.

The St. Sava Serbian Orthodox Cathedral is a landmark of the Serbian community in Milwaukee, located by the American Serb hall, which the congregation also operated until putting it up for sale in January 2021 due to financial challenges caused by the COVID-19 pandemic.

The Church of Jesus Christ of Latter-day Saints has a presence in the Milwaukee area. The Milwaukee area has two stakes, with fourteen wards and four branches among them. The closest temple is the Chicago Illinois Temple. The area is part of the Wisconsin Milwaukee Mission.

== Economy ==
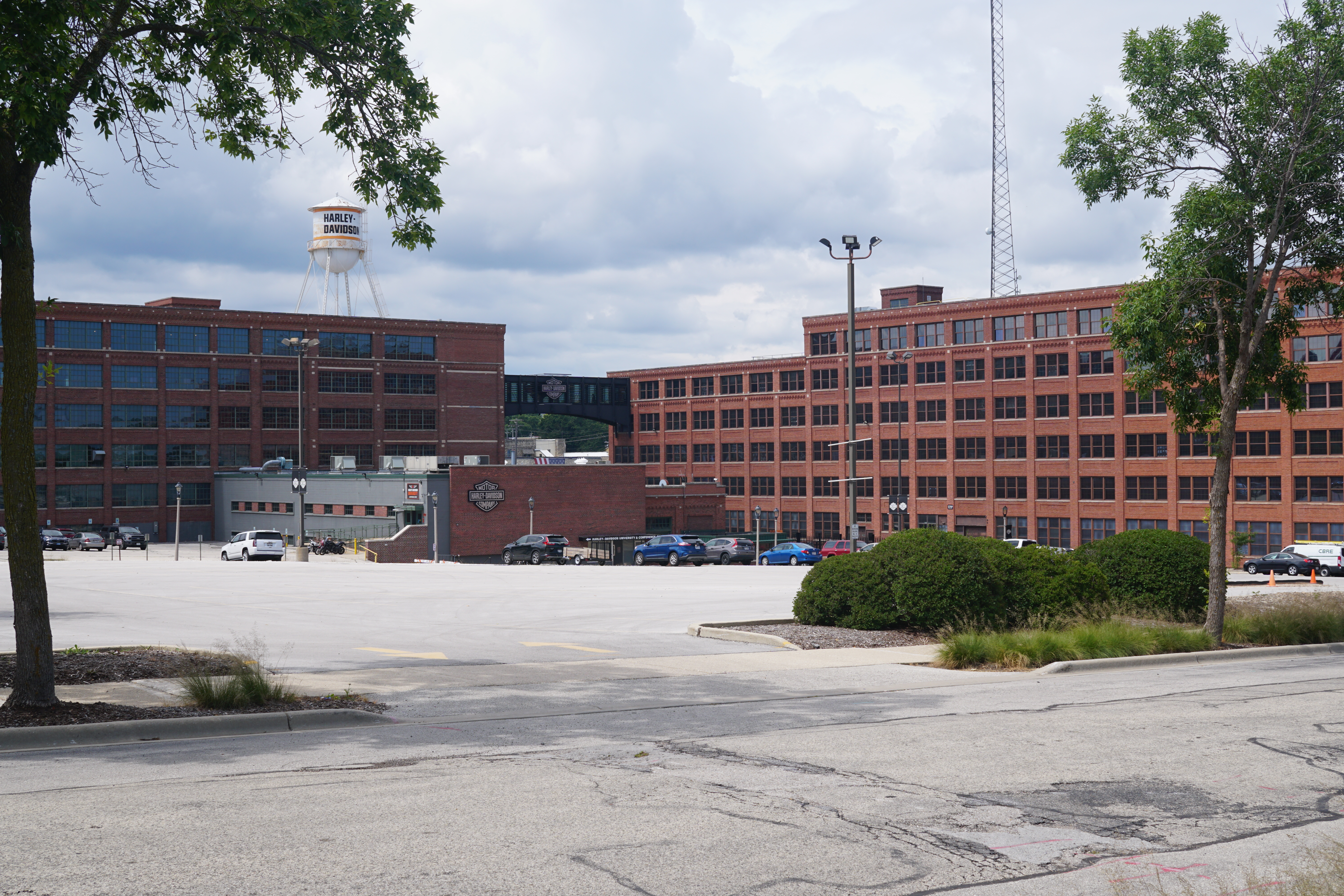
Motorcycle manufacturer Harley-Davidson is based in Milwaukee; the Harley-Davidson Museum chronicles its history.

Milwaukee is rated as a "Sufficiency" city by the Globalization and World Cities Research Network. The city is home to the international headquarters of five Fortune 500 companies: Northwestern Mutual, Fiserv, ManpowerGroup, Rockwell Automation, and WEC Energy Group. Other companies based in Milwaukee include Harley-Davidson, Briggs & Stratton, Brady Corporation, Baird (investment bank), Alliance Federated Energy, Sensient Technologies, Hal Leonard, Direct Supply, Rite-Hite, the American Society for Quality, A. O. Smith, Rexnord, Master Lock, Marcus Corporation, REV Group, American Signal Corporation, GE Healthcare, Diagnostic Imaging and Clinical Systems, and MGIC Investments.

The Milwaukee metropolitan area ranks fifth in the United States in terms of the number of Fortune 500 company headquarters as a share of the population. Milwaukee also has a large number of financial service firms, particularly those specializing in mutual funds and transaction processing systems, and a number of publishing and printing companies. Service and managerial jobs are the fastest-growing segments of the Milwaukee economy, and health care alone makes up 27% of the jobs in the city.

=== Brewing ===
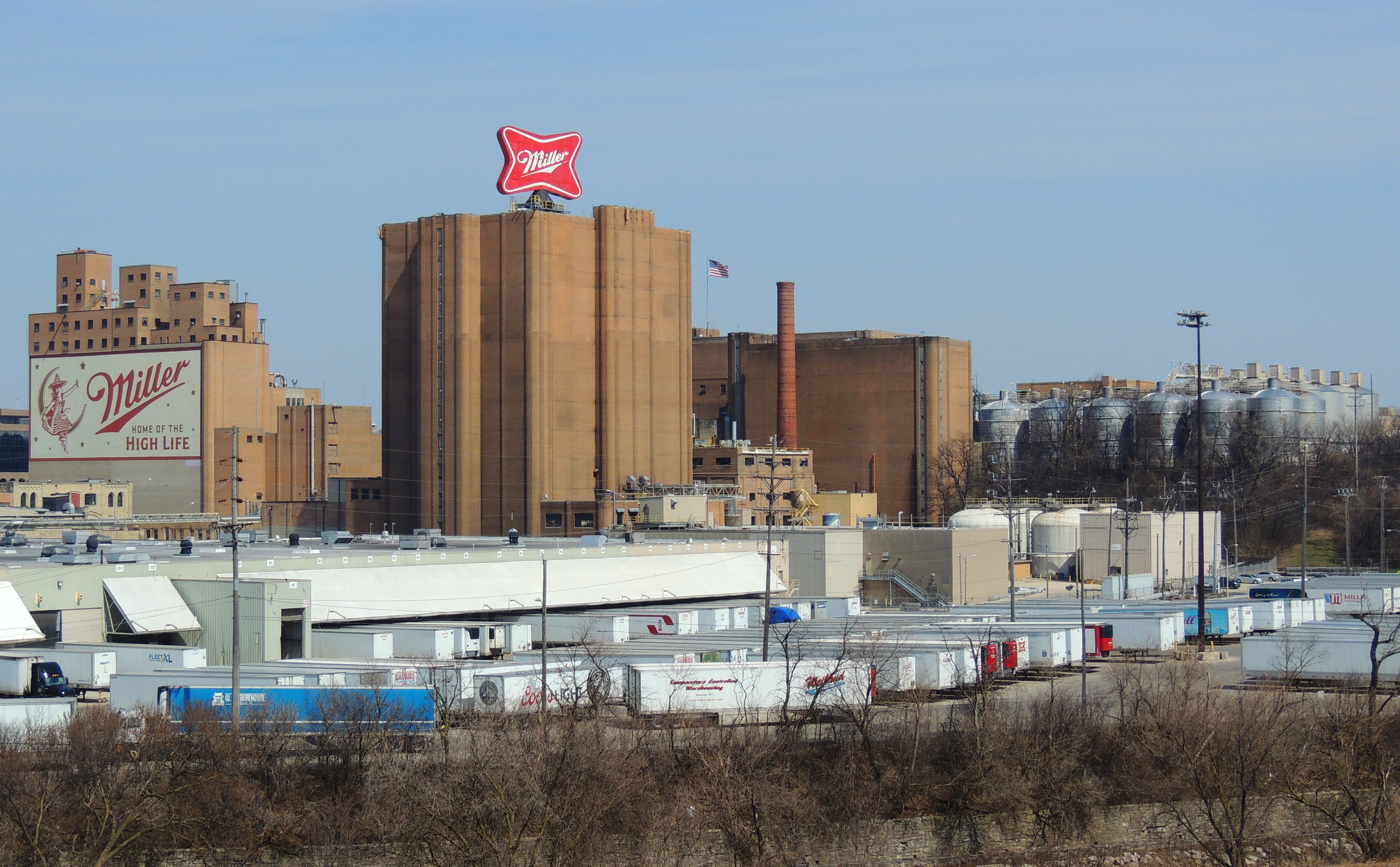
Miller Brewing Company, founded in 1855, has its main brewery in Milwaukee's West Side.

Milwaukee became synonymous with Germans and beer beginning in the 1840s. The Germans had long enjoyed beer and set up breweries when they arrived in Milwaukee. By 1856, there were more than two dozen breweries in Milwaukee, most of them owned and operated by Germans. Besides making beer for the rest of the nation, Milwaukeeans enjoyed consuming the various beers produced in the city's breweries. As early as 1843, pioneer historian James Buck recorded 138 taverns in Milwaukee, an average of one per forty residents. Today, beer halls and taverns are abundant in the city, but only one of the major breweries—Miller—remains in Milwaukee.

Milwaukee was once the home to four of the world's largest beer breweries (Schlitz, Blatz, Pabst, and Miller), and was the number one beer producing city in the world for many years, giving it the nickname " Brew City ". As late as 1981, Milwaukee had the greatest brewing capacity in the world. Despite the decline in its position as the world's leading beer producer after the loss of two of those breweries, Miller Brewing Company remains a key employer by employing over 2,200 of the city's workers. Because of Miller's position as the second-largest beer-maker in the U.S., the city remains known as a beer town. The city and surrounding areas are seeing a resurgence in microbreweries, nanobreweries and brewpubs with the craft beer movement.

The historic Milwaukee Brewery in "Miller Valley" at 4000 West State Street, is the oldest functioning major brewery in the United States. In addition to Miller and the heavily automated Leinenkugel's brewery in the old Blatz 10th Street plant, other stand-alone breweries in Milwaukee include Milwaukee Brewing Company, a microbrewery in Walker's Point neighborhood; Lakefront Brewery, a microbrewery in Brewers Hill; and Sprecher Brewery, a German brewery that also brews craft sodas. Since 2015, nearly two dozen craft brewing companies have been established in the city.

=== Other industries ===
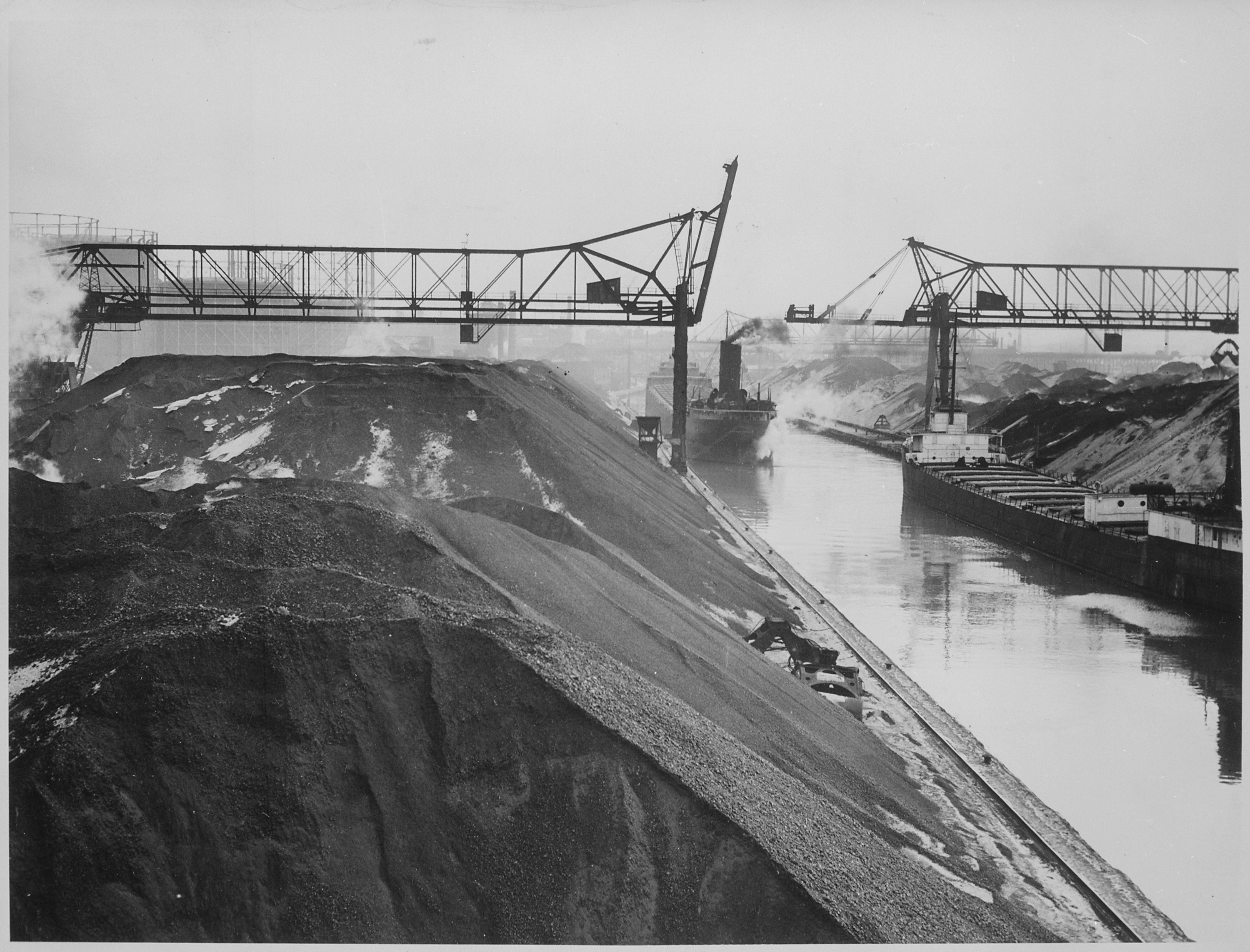
Milwaukee Western Fuel Company coal docks in the Menomonee Valley, 1942

Milwaukee was situated as a port city and a center for collecting and distributing produce. Some of the new immigrants who were settling into the new state of Wisconsin during the middle of the 19th century were wheat farmers. By 1860, Wisconsin was one of the major producers of wheat. Rail transport was needed to transport this grain from the wheat fields of Wisconsin to Milwaukee's harbor. Improvements in railways at the time made this possible.

There was intense competition for markets with Chicago, situated across the state line in Illinois, and, to a lesser degree, with Racine and Kenosha in Wisconsin. Eventually, Chicago won out due to its superior financial markets and transportation position, including the Chicago Portage and being the hub of the railroad lines in the United States. Milwaukee did solidify its place as the commercial capital of Wisconsin and an important market in the Midwest.

Because of its easy access to Lake Michigan and other waterways, Milwaukee's Menomonee Valley has historically been home to manufacturing, stockyards, rendering plants, shipping, and other heavy industry. Manufacturing was concentrated on the north side, with a peak of over 50 manufacturers in that industrialized area.

Reshaping of the valley began with the railroads built by city co-founder Byron Kilbourn to bring product from Wisconsin's farm interior to the port. By 1862 Milwaukee was the largest shipper of wheat on the planet, and related industry developed. Grain elevators were built and, due to Milwaukee's dominant German immigrant population, breweries sprang up around the processing of barley and hops. A number of tanneries were constructed, of which the Pfister & Vogel tannery grew to become the largest in America.

In 1843 George Burnham and his brother Jonathan opened a brickyard near 16th Street. When a durable and distinct cream-colored brick came out of the clay beds, other brickyards sprang up to take advantage of this resource. Because many of the city's buildings were built using this material it earned the nickname "Cream City", and consequently the brick was called Cream City brick. By 1881 the Burnham brickyard, which employed 200 men and peaked at 15 million bricks a year, was the largest in the world.

Flour mills, packing plants, breweries, railways and tanneries further industrialized the valley. With the marshlands drained and the Kinnickinnic and Milwaukee Rivers dredged, attention turned to the valley. Along with the processing industries, bulk commodity storage, machining, and manufacturing entered the scene. The valley was home to the Milwaukee Road, Falk Corporation, Cutler-Hammer, Harnischfeger Corporation, Chain Belt Company, Nordberg Manufacturing Company and other industry giants. Early in the 20th century, Milwaukee was home to several pioneer brass era automobile makers, including Ogren (1919–1922).

== Culture ==
Often referred to as the City of Festivals, Milwaukee regularly hosts festivals and cultural events which take place throughout the summer, many at Henry Maier Festival Park. The city is home to many world-class cultural institutions and museums, a thriving culinary scene, and is popular for recreation on Lake Michigan and the Milwaukee River. Milwaukee is a culturally diverse city, historically defined by its German and Polish influence, and has been expanded by Black and Hispanic influence.

=== Museums ===
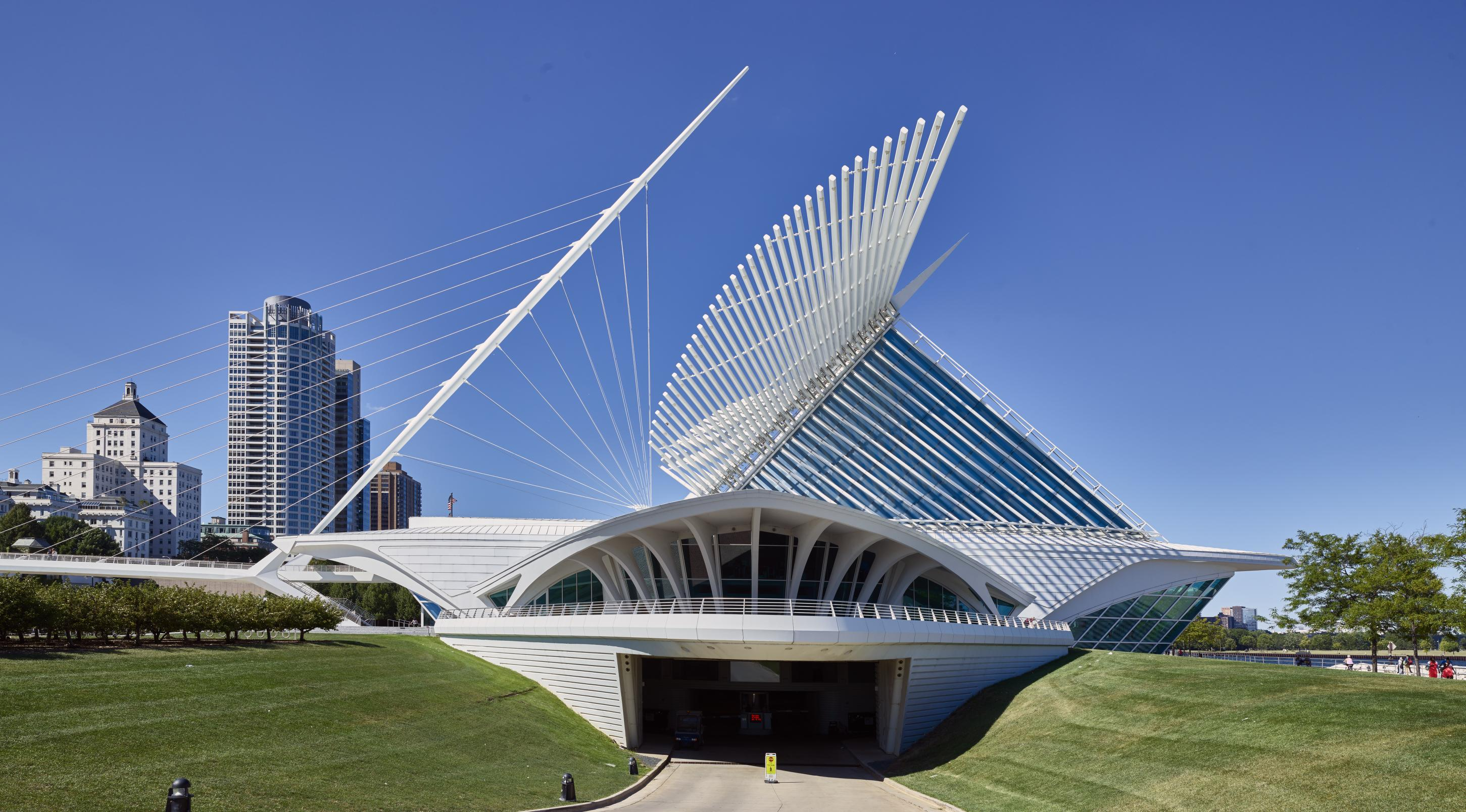
Milwaukee Art Museum

The Milwaukee Art Museum is perhaps Milwaukee's most visually prominent cultural attraction, especially its $100 million wing designed by Santiago Calatrava in his first American commission. The museum includes a brise soleil, a moving sunscreen that unfolds similarly to the wing of a bird. The Grohmann Museum at the Milwaukee School of Engineering contains the world's most comprehensive art collection dedicated to the evolution of human work. Haggerty Museum of Art on the Marquette University campus houses several classical masterpieces and is open to the public. The Villa Terrace Decorative Arts Museum is the former home of Lloyd Smith, president of the A.O. Smith corporation, and has a terraced garden, an assortment of Renaissance art, and rotating exhibits. Charles Allis Art Museum, in the Tudor-style mansion of Charles Allis, hosts several changing exhibits every year in the building's original antique furnished setting.

The Milwaukee Public Museum has been Milwaukee's primary natural history and human history museum for 125 years, with over 150,000 square feet (14,000 m^{2}) of permanent exhibits. Exhibits feature Africa, Europe, the Arctic, Oceania, and South and Middle America, ancient Western civilizations, dinosaurs, the tropical rainforest, streets of Old Milwaukee, a European Village, live insects and arthropods, a Samson gorilla replica, the Puelicher Butterfly Wing, hands-on laboratories, and animatronics. The museum also contains an IMAX movie theater/planetarium. Milwaukee Public Museum owns the world's largest dinosaur skull.

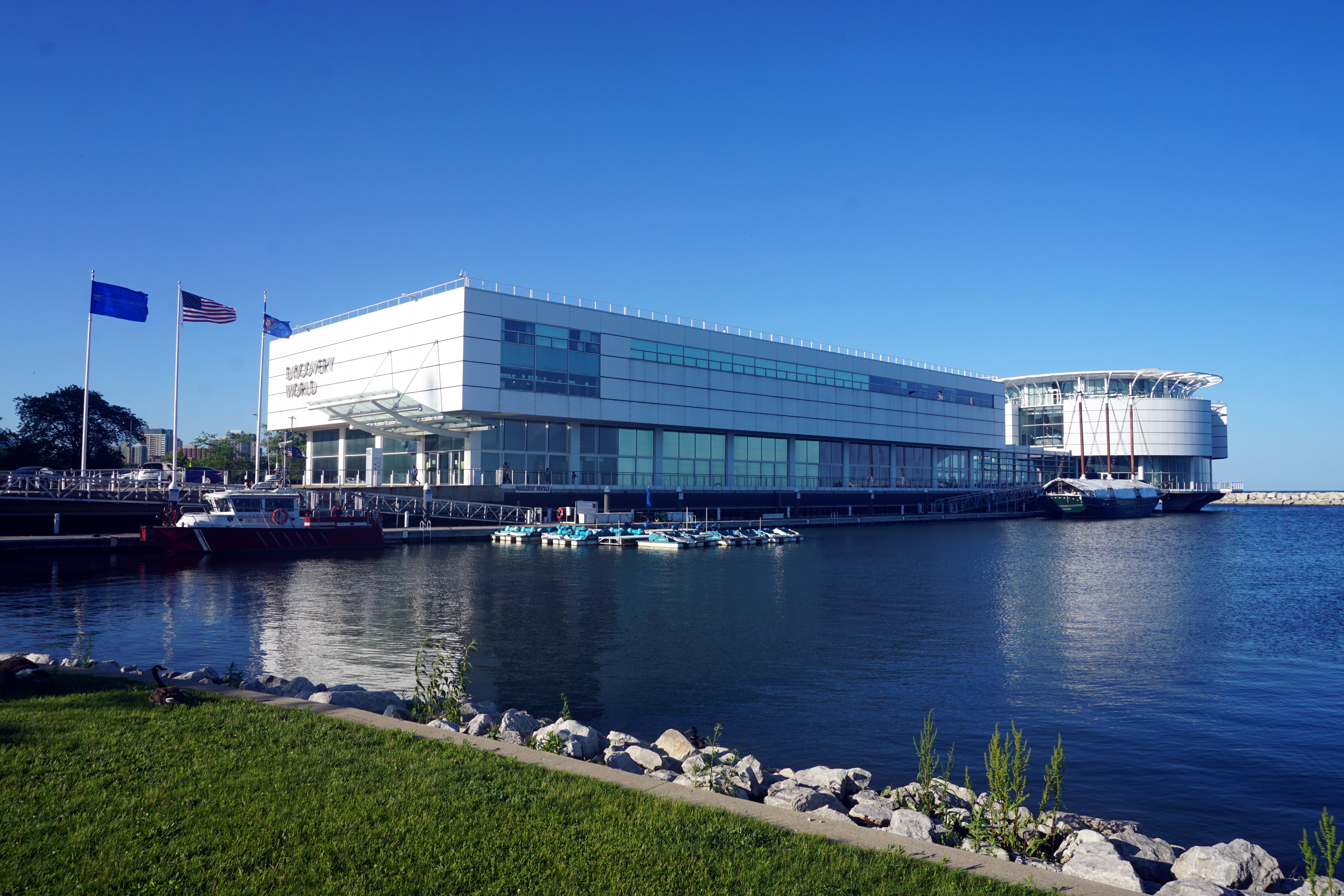
Discovery World

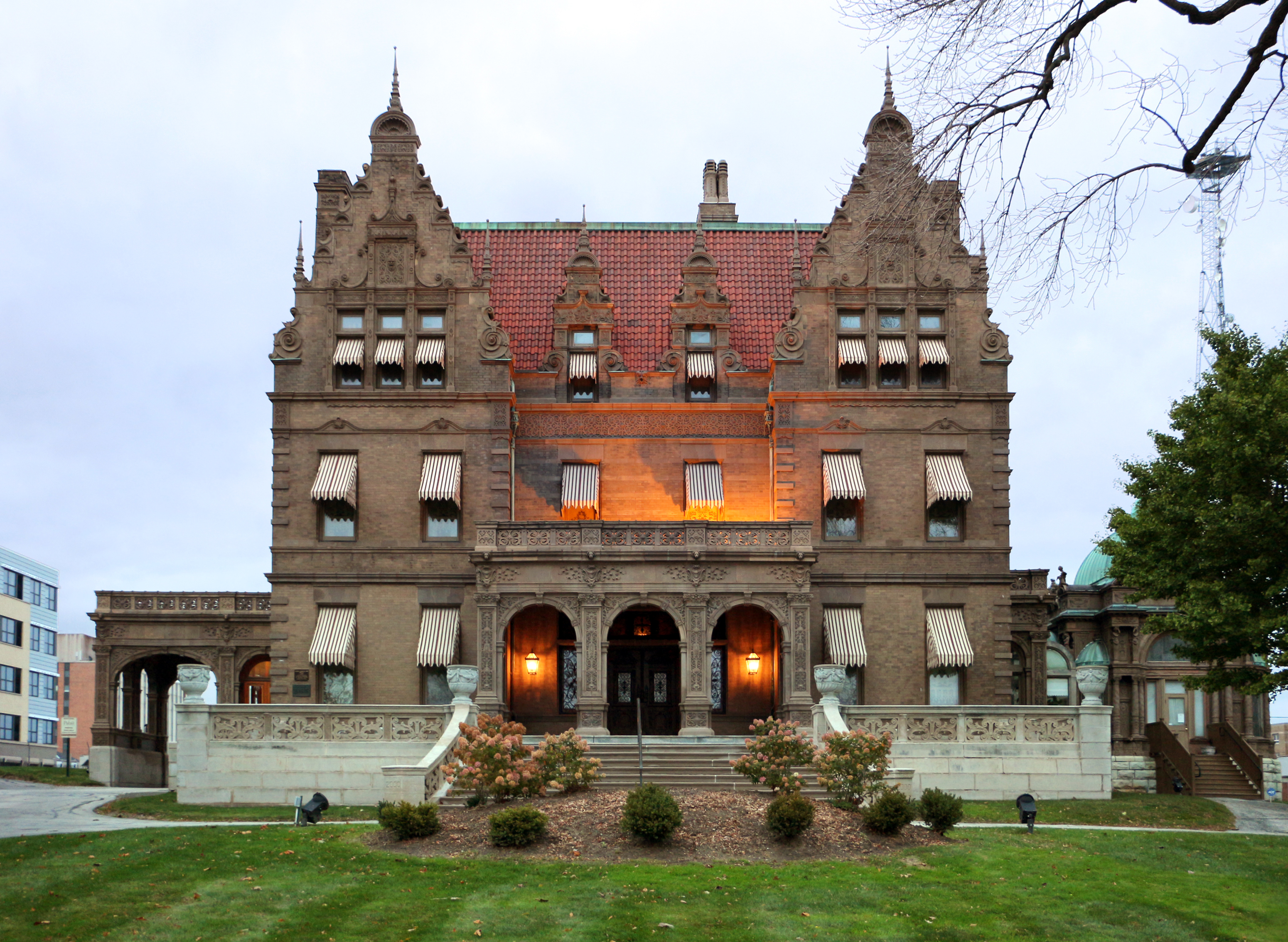
Pabst Mansion

Discovery World, Milwaukee's largest museum dedicated to science, is just south of the Milwaukee Art Museum along the lakefront. Visitors are drawn by its interactive exhibits, saltwater and freshwater aquariums, as well as touch tanks and digital theaters. A double helix staircase wraps around the 40-foot (12 m) kinetic sculpture of a human genome. Betty Brinn Children's Museum is geared toward children under ten years of age and is filled with hands-on exhibits and interactive programs, offering families a chance to learn together. Voted one of the top ten museums for children by Parents Magazine, it exemplifies the philosophy that constructive play nurtures the mind.

Pabst Mansion was built in 1892 by beer tycoon Frederick Pabst and was once considered the jewel of Milwaukee's famous avenue of mansions called the "Grand Avenue". Interior rooms have been restored with period furniture, to create an authentic replica of a Victorian Mansion. The Milwaukee County Historical Society features Milwaukee during the late 19th century through the mid-20th century, including a research library. The Wisconsin Black Historical Society documents and preserves the historical heritage of African descent in Wisconsin, exhibiting collecting and disseminating materials depicting this heritage. America's Black Holocaust Museum, founded by lynching survivor James Cameron, featured exhibits which chronicle the injustices suffered throughout history by African Americans in the United States. The Jewish Museum Milwaukee is dedicated to preserving and presenting the history of the Jewish people in southeastern Wisconsin and celebrating the continuum of Jewish heritage and culture.

The Harley-Davidson Museum, opened in 2008, pays tribute to Harley-Davidson motorcycles. The Mitchell Gallery of Flight at Milwaukee Mitchell International Airport exhibits Milwaukee's aviation history.

=== Performing arts ===
Milwaukee is home to a large performing arts scene, with numerous groups and venues showcasing a variety of performances. The Bel Canto Chorus and Florentine Opera contribute to the city's choral and operatic traditions. The Milwaukee Symphony Orchestra and Milwaukee Ballet represent classic performing arts in the city. The Milwaukee Repertory Theater, Milwaukee Opera Theatre, and Milwaukee Public Theatre each provide diverse theatrical experiences, from classic plays to contemporary works. First Stage Children's Theater, the Milwaukee Youth Theatre, and Milwaukee Youth Arts Center provide children's theater entertainment. For live music, venues like The Rave/Eagles Ballroom, Riverside Theater, Turner Hall, and the Pabst Theater host concerts across a range of genres, while Present Music offers contemporary performances. Other notable venues include the Miller High Life Theatre, Skylight Music Theatre, and the Wisconsin Conservatory of Music.

=== Public art and monuments ===
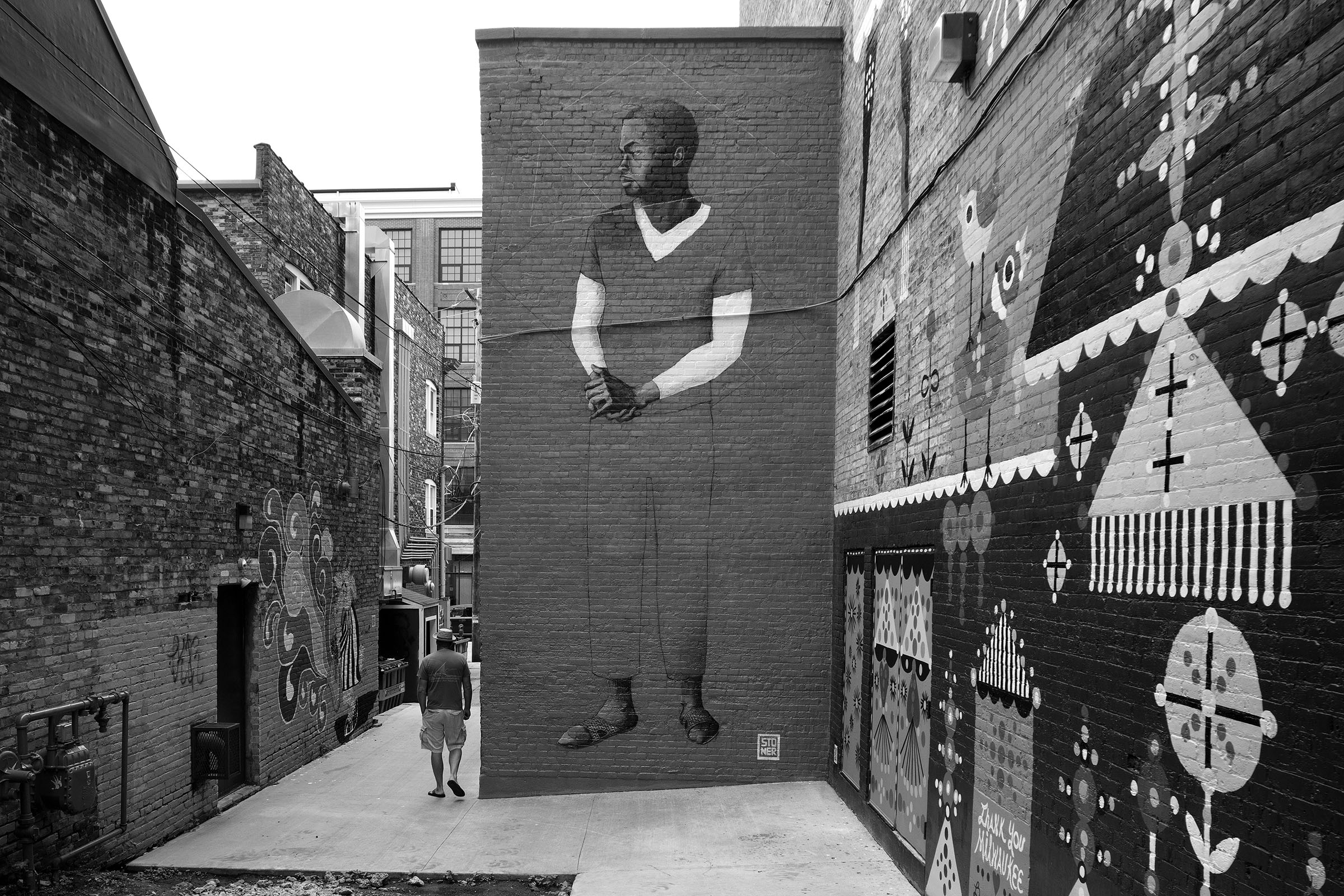
Black Cat Alley

Milwaukee has some 75 sculptures to honor the many people and topics reflecting the city's history. Among the more prominent monuments are:

- The Calling I-beams
- Friedrich Wilhelm von Steuben
- Tadeusz Kościuszko
- Casimir Pulaski
- Solomon Juneau
- Abraham Lincoln
- George Washington
- Bronze Fonz
- Pope John Paul II
- Martin Luther King Jr.
- The Victorious Charge
- Leif Ericson
- Jacques Marquette
- Goethe-Schiller Monument
- Immigrant Mother
- Letter Carriers' Monument, a memorial to the National Association of Letter Carriers

Additionally, Milwaukee has a mural arts scene. Black Cat Alley is an arts destination in a one-block alleyway in the East Side neighborhood recognized for its street art mural installations. It sits behind the Oriental Theatre and includes both temporary and semi-permanent installations by a variety of artists and art groups. Another corridor of street art in Milwaukee is on the south side in the Walker's Point neighborhood, especially along 5th and 2nd streets.

=== Festivals ===
The city hosts an annual lakefront music festival called Summerfest. Listed in the 1999 Guinness Book of World Records as the largest music festival in the world, in 2017 Summerfest attracted 831,769. The adjacent city of West Allis has been the site of the Wisconsin State Fair for over a century.

Milwaukee hosts a variety of primarily ethnically themed festivals throughout the summer. Held generally on the lakefront Summerfest grounds, these festivals span several days (typically Friday plus the weekend) and celebrate Milwaukee's history and diversity. Festivals for the LGBT (PrideFest) and Polish (Polish Fest) communities are typically held in June. Summerfest spans 11 days at the end of June and beginning of July. There are French (Bastille Days), Greek, Italian (Festa Italiana) and German (German Fest) festivals in July. The African, Arab, Irish (Irish Fest), Mexican, and American Indian events wrap it up from August through September. Milwaukee is host to the annual Film Girl Film Festival in the fall, celebrating shorts and features directed by women. Milwaukee is also home to Trainfest, the largest operating model railroad show in America, in November.

=== Cuisine ===
Milwaukee's ethnic cuisines include German, Italian, Russian, Hmong, French, Serbian, Polish, Thai, Chinese, Mexican, Indian, Korean, Japanese, Vietnamese, Turkish, Middle Eastern, and Ethiopian.

There are several distinct cuisines and culinary traditions associated with Milwaukee, including cheese curds, frozen custard, sausage, Milwaukee-Style Pizza, Butter burgers, Fish Fry on Friday, Hot Ham and Rolls on Sunday, and marinated herring on New Year's Eve.

The city is home to a thriving culinary scene, with many James Beard recognized establishments. Milwaukee County hosts the Zoo-A La Carte at the Milwaukee County Zoo, and various ethnic festivals like Irish Fest, Polish Fest, German Fest, Mexican Fiesta, and Festa Italiana celebrate various types of cuisine in summer months.

=== Music ===
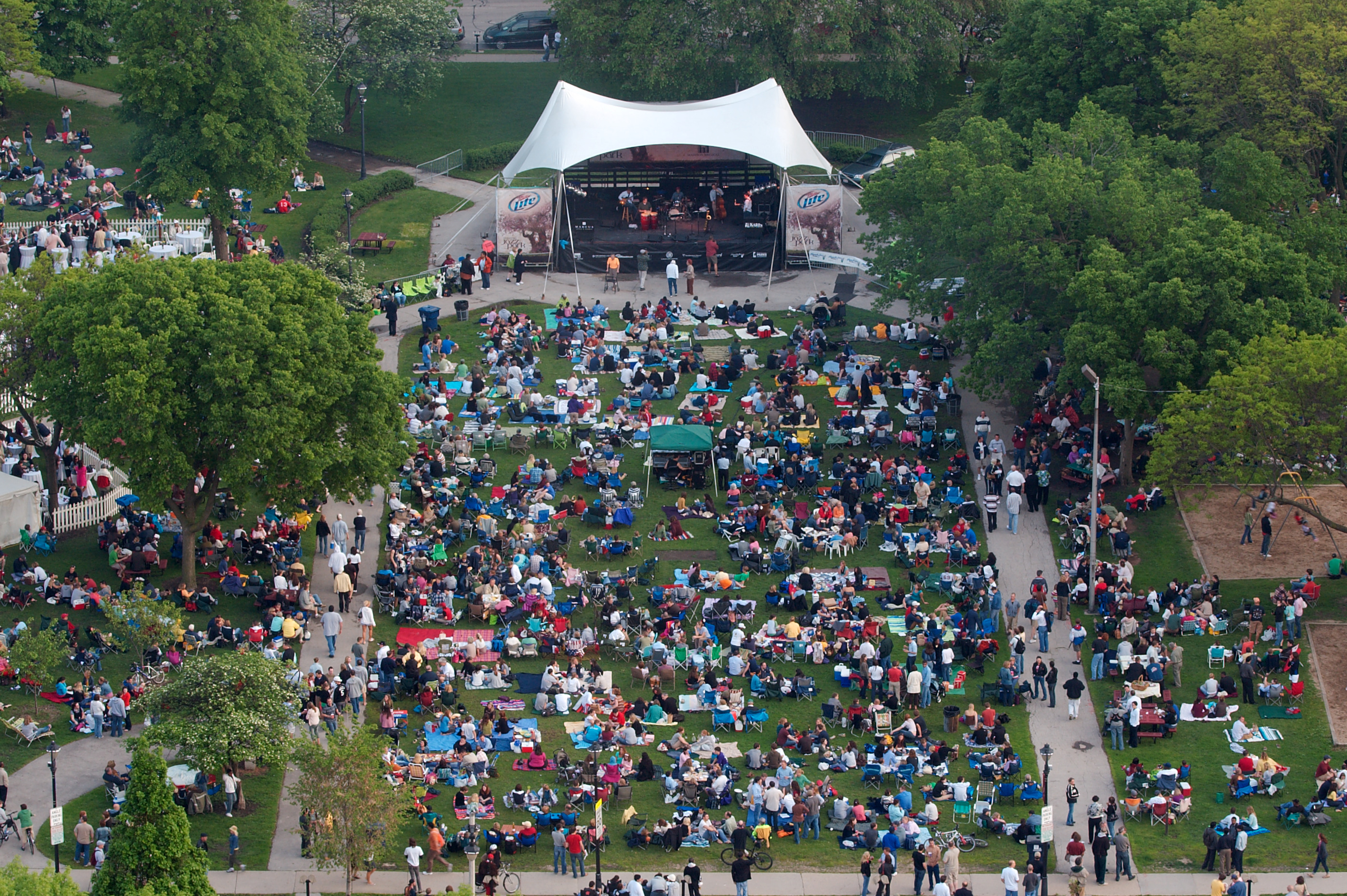
Aerial view of "Jazz in the Park", Cathedral Square Park

Milwaukee has a long history of musical activity. The first organized musical society, called "Milwaukee Beethoven Society" formed in 1843, three years before the city was incorporated.

The large concentrations of German and other European immigrants contributed to the musical character of the city. Saengerfeste were held regularly.

In the early 20th century, guitarist Les Paul and pianist Liberace were some of the area's most famous musicians. Both Paul, born in Waukesha, and Liberace, born in West Allis, launched their careers in Milwaukee music venues. Paramount Records, primarily a jazz and blues record label, was founded in Grafton, a northern suburb of Milwaukee, and operated active between 1917 and 1932. Hal Leonard Corporation, founded in 1947, is one of the world's largest music print publishers, and is headquartered in Milwaukee. More recently, Milwaukee has a history of rock, hip-hop, jazz, soul, blues, punk, ska, industrial music, electronica, world music, and pop music bands.

Milwaukee's most famous music venue is Summerfest. Founded in 1968, Summerfest features 700–800 live musical acts across 12 stages during 11 days over a 12-day period beginning in late June; while the dates adjust each year, Summerfest always includes July 4. On the Summerfest grounds, the largest venue is the American Family Insurance Amphitheater with a 23,000 person capacity. Adjacent is the BMO Harris Pavilion, which has a capacity of roughly 10,000. The BMO Harris Pavilion also hosts numerous concerts and events outside of Summerfest; other stages are also used during the numerous other festivals held on the grounds.

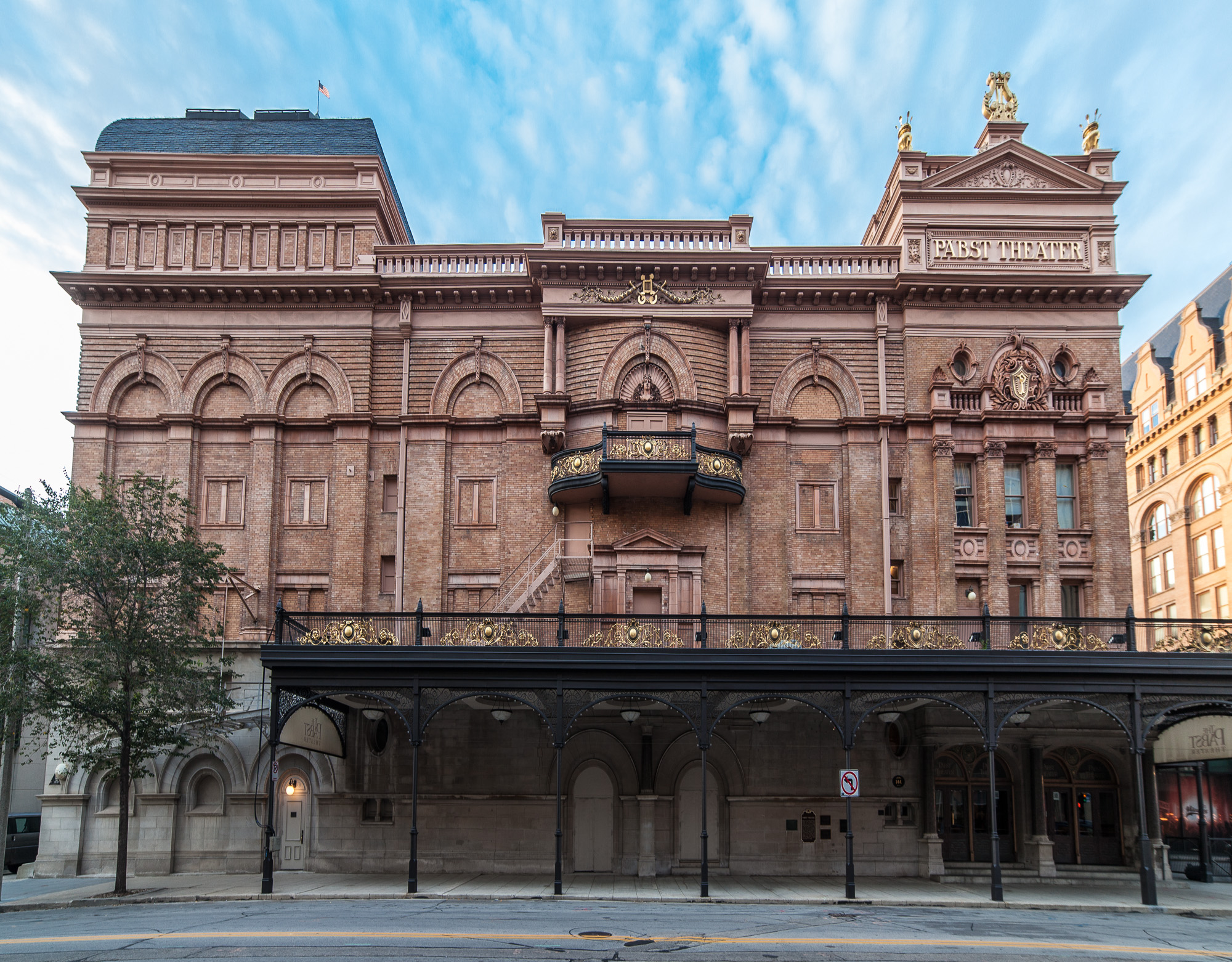
Pabst Theater

Venues such as Pabst Theater, Marcus Center for Performing Arts, the Helene Zelazo Center for the Performing Arts, Marcus Amphitheater (Summerfest Grounds), Riverside Theater, the Northern Lights Theater, and The Rave frequently bring internationally known acts to Milwaukee. 'Jazz in the Park', a weekly jazz show held at downtown Cathedral Square Park, has become a summer tradition; free, public performances with a picnic environment. Nearby Pere Marquette Park hosts "River Rhythms" on Wednesday nights.

Musicians and musical acts originating in the Milwaukee area include Steve Miller (rock), Wladziu Valentino Liberace (piano), Al Jarreau (jazz), Eric Benet (neo-soul), Speech (hip-hop), Daryl Stuermer (rock), Streetz-n-Young Deuces (hip-hop), BoDeans (rock), Les Paul (jazz), the Violent Femmes (alternative), Coo Coo Cal (rap), Die Kreuzen (punk), Andy Hurley of Fall Out Boy (punk), Rico Love (R&B), Andrew 'The Butcher' Mrotek of The Academy Is... (alt-rock), Showoff (pop-punk), The Promise Ring (indie), Lights Out Asia (post-rock), the Gufs (alt rock), Brief Candles (rock), IshDARR (rap), Decibully (indie), and Reyna (synth-pop).

In the present day, Milwaukee Hip-Hop has come to define the cultural output of the city, with a thriving local artist scene, and many Milwaukee-based artists achieving national popularity.

== Sports ==
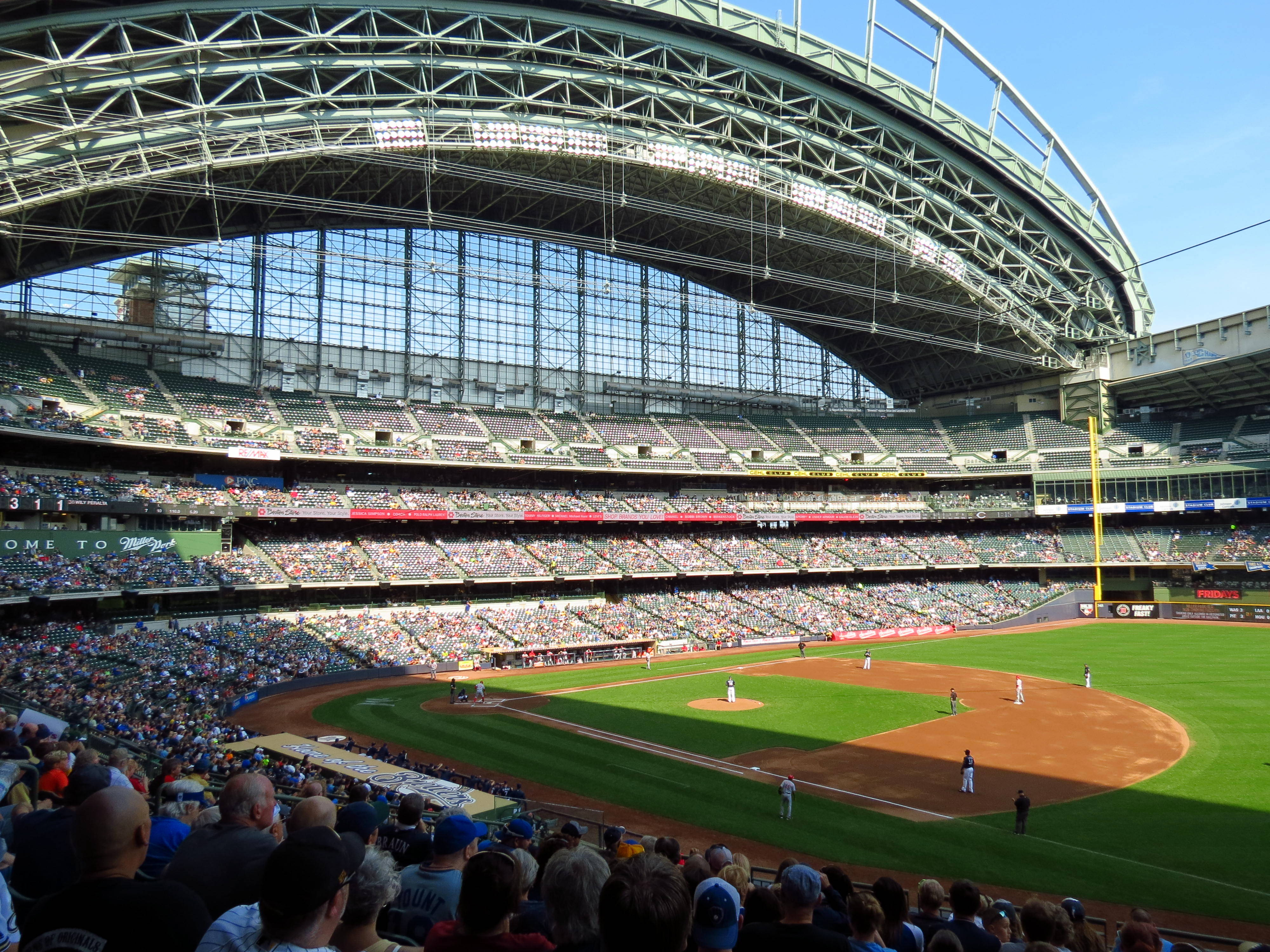
American Family Field, home of the Milwaukee Brewers

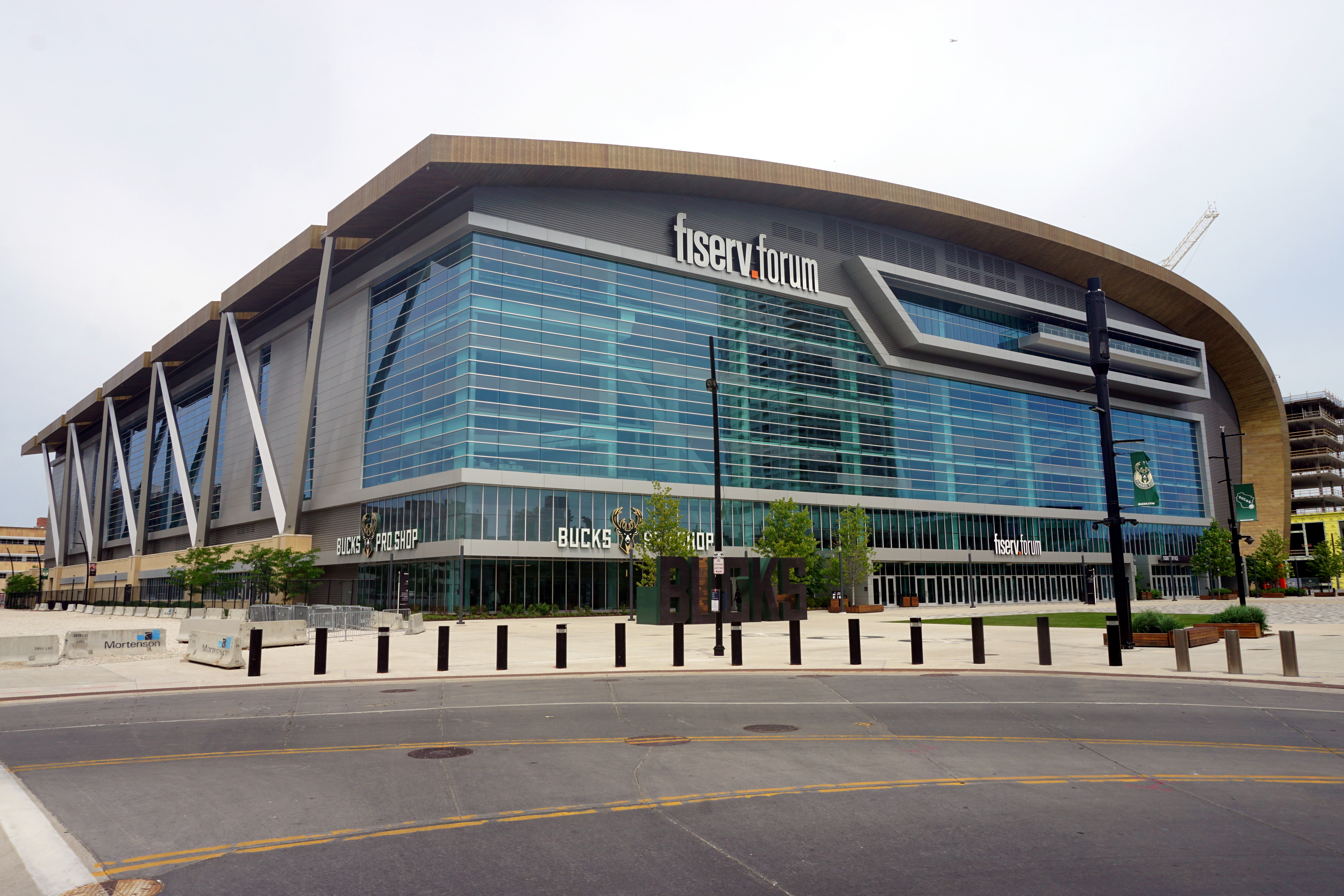
Fiserv Forum, home of the Milwaukee Bucks and Marquette Golden Eagles

Currently, Milwaukee's sports teams include:

| Club | Sport | Founded | Current league | Stadium |
|---|---|---|---|---|
| Milwaukee Bucks | Basketball | 1968 | Eastern and Central (NBA) | Fiserv Forum |
| Milwaukee Brewers | Baseball | 1970 | National League (MLB) | American Family Field |
| Milwaukee Bavarians | Soccer | 1929 | USL League Two | Heartland Value Fund Stadium |
| Marquette Golden Eagles | Basketball | 1916 | Big East Conference (NCAA) | Fiserv Forum |
| Milwaukee Panthers | Basketball | 1956 | Horizon League (NCAA) | UW–Milwaukee Panther Arena |
| Milwaukee Admirals | Hockey | 1970 | American Hockey League | UW–Milwaukee Panther Arena |
| Milwaukee Wave | Indoor soccer | 1984 | Major Arena Soccer League | UW–Milwaukee Panther Arena |
| Brewcity Bruisers | Roller Derby | 2006 | WFTDA | UW–Milwaukee Panther Arena |
| Milwaukee Milkmen | Baseball | 2018 | American Association of Independent Professional Baseball | Franklin Field |
| FC Milwaukee Torrent | Soccer | 2015 | National Premier Soccer League (Men) Women's Premier Soccer League (Women) | Hart Park |

The city is represented in two of the four major professional sports leagues in the United States and Canada–the Milwaukee Brewers of Major League Baseball and the Milwaukee Bucks of the National Basketball Association. Milwaukee does not have a National Football League team or a National Hockey League team. For a short time, Milwaukee was home to the NFL's Badgers, from 1922 to 1926. Today, the city is generally considered a second home market for the NFL's Green Bay Packers. The team split its home schedule between Green Bay and Milwaukee from 1933 to 1994, although most home games during that time were played in Green Bay. Of the games played in Milwaukee, the majority were played at County Stadium. However, by 1991, the Packers claimed that revenue from the Milwaukee games were 60% of the revenue generated from the Green Bay games, and Milwaukee officials did not act upon the Packers' request that County Stadium be replaced with an updated stadium. The Packers' longtime flagship station is Milwaukee-based WTMJ AM 620.

Milwaukee also has a strong history of nonprofessional sports dating back to the 19th century. Abraham Lincoln watched cricket in Milwaukee in 1849 when he attended a game between Chicago and Milwaukee. In 1854, the Milwaukee Cricket Club had 150 members.

Milwaukee was the host city of the International Cycling Classic, which included the men's and women's Superweek Pro Tour races, featuring cyclists and teams from across the United States and more than 20 other countries.

The Milwaukee Mile in western Milwaukee currently hosts races in the IndyCar Series and formerly the NASCAR Nationwide, Craftsman Truck, and ARCA Series, it is the oldest consecutively active racetrack in America.

== Parks and recreation ==
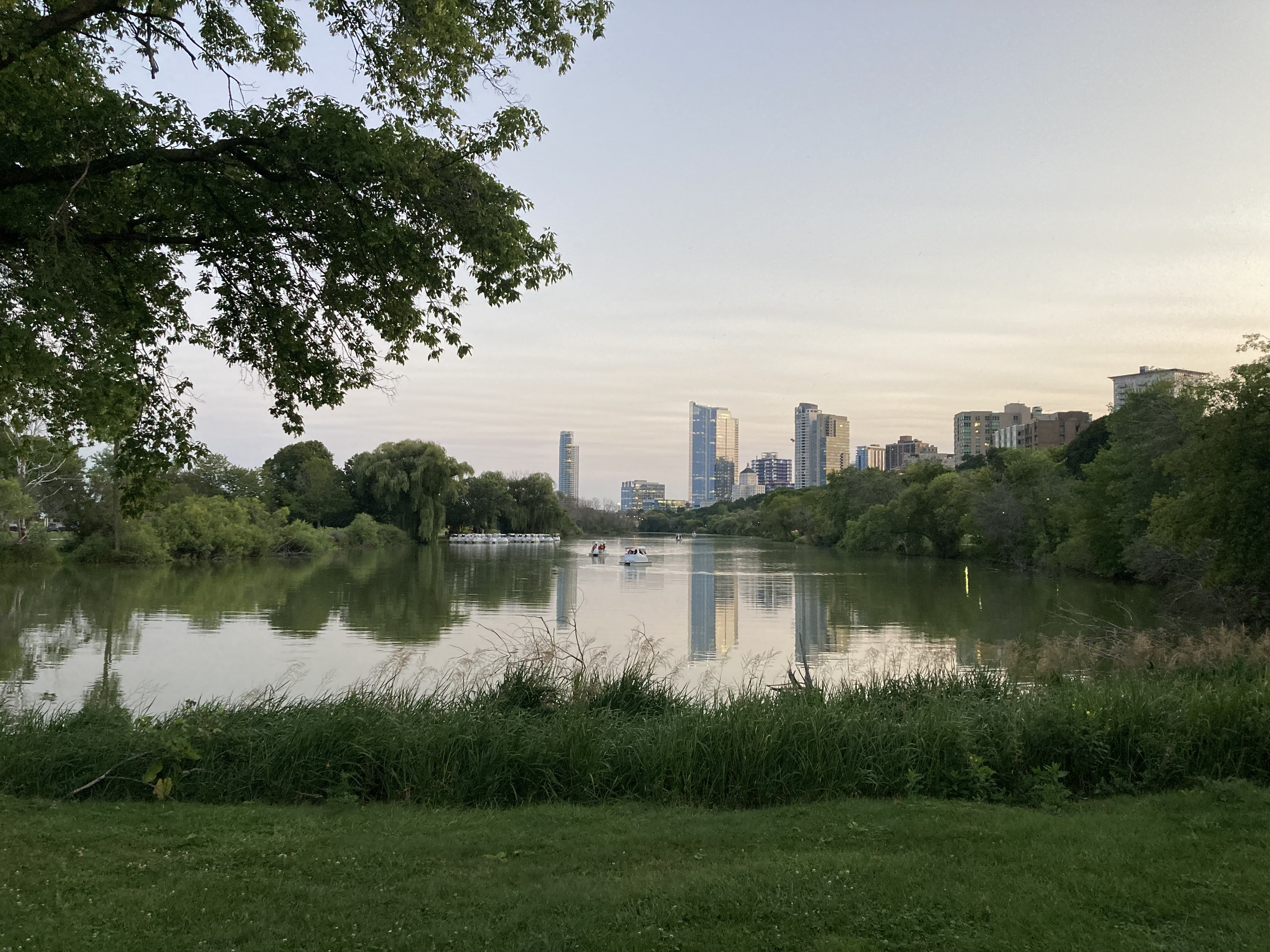
Veterans Park lagoon

Milwaukee is known for its well-developed Milwaukee County Parks system. The "Grand Necklace of Parks", designed by famed landscape architect Frederick Law Olmsted, includes Lake Park and Bradford Beach, River Park (now Riverside Park), and West Park (now Washington Park). Milwaukee County Parks offer facilities for sunbathing, picnics, grilling, disc golf, and ice skating. Milwaukee has over 140 parks with over 15,000 acres (6,100 ha) of parks and parkways. During the summer months, Cathedral Park in downtown Milwaukee hosts "Jazz in the Park" on Thursday nights. Nearby Pere Marquette Park hosts "River Rhythms" on Wednesday nights. Since 2012, some public parks have hosted public beer gardens in the Summer.

The Milwaukee Riverwalk is a continuous pedestrian walkway along the Milwaukee River containing art displays, cafés and restaurants. It extends from the Historic Third Ward district to Caesars Park near Brady Street. It also links to the Hank Aaron State Trail, Lakeshore State Park, and Erie Street Plaza. The Hank Aaron State Trail is a 15.2-mile (24.5 km) shared-use path that travels east-west between Lakeshore State Park to Wauwatosa via the Menomonee Valley.

Lakeshore State Park consists of 22 acres (8.9 ha) on the shores of Lake Michigan. It is situated adjacent to both Discovery World and Henry Maier Festival Park. It is the only urban state park in Wisconsin and features restored prairie and a pebble beach.

=== Nature centers ===
Milwaukee's parks are home to several nature centers. Mitchell Park Horticultural Conservatory is composed of three beehive-shaped glass domes that span 140 feet (43 m) in diameter and are 85 feet (26 m) high. They are properly referred to as the world's first conoidal domes. They cover 45,000 square feet (4,200 m^{2}) of display area and were constructed in stages from 1959 to 1967. The conservatory includes the Tropical Dome, the Arid Dome and the Show Dome, which hosts four seasonal (cultural, literary, or historic) shows and one Christmas-themed exhibit held annually in December.

The Urban Ecology Center offers programming for adults and children from its three branches located in Riverside Park, Washington Park, and the Menomonee Valley (near Three Bridges Park). The Wisconsin Department of Natural Resources operates a nature center at Havenwoods State Forest. The city is also served by two nearby suburban nature centers. Wehr Nature Center is operated by Milwaukee County in Whitnall Park, spread across Franklin, Greendale and Hales Corners. Admission is free, and parking costs $5 per vehicle. The Schlitz Audubon Nature Center in Bayside, Wisconsin, charges admittance fees for visitors.

The Monarch Trail, on the Milwaukee County Grounds in Wauwatosa, is a 1.25-mile (2 km) trail that highlights the fall migration of the monarch butterflies.

=== Markets ===
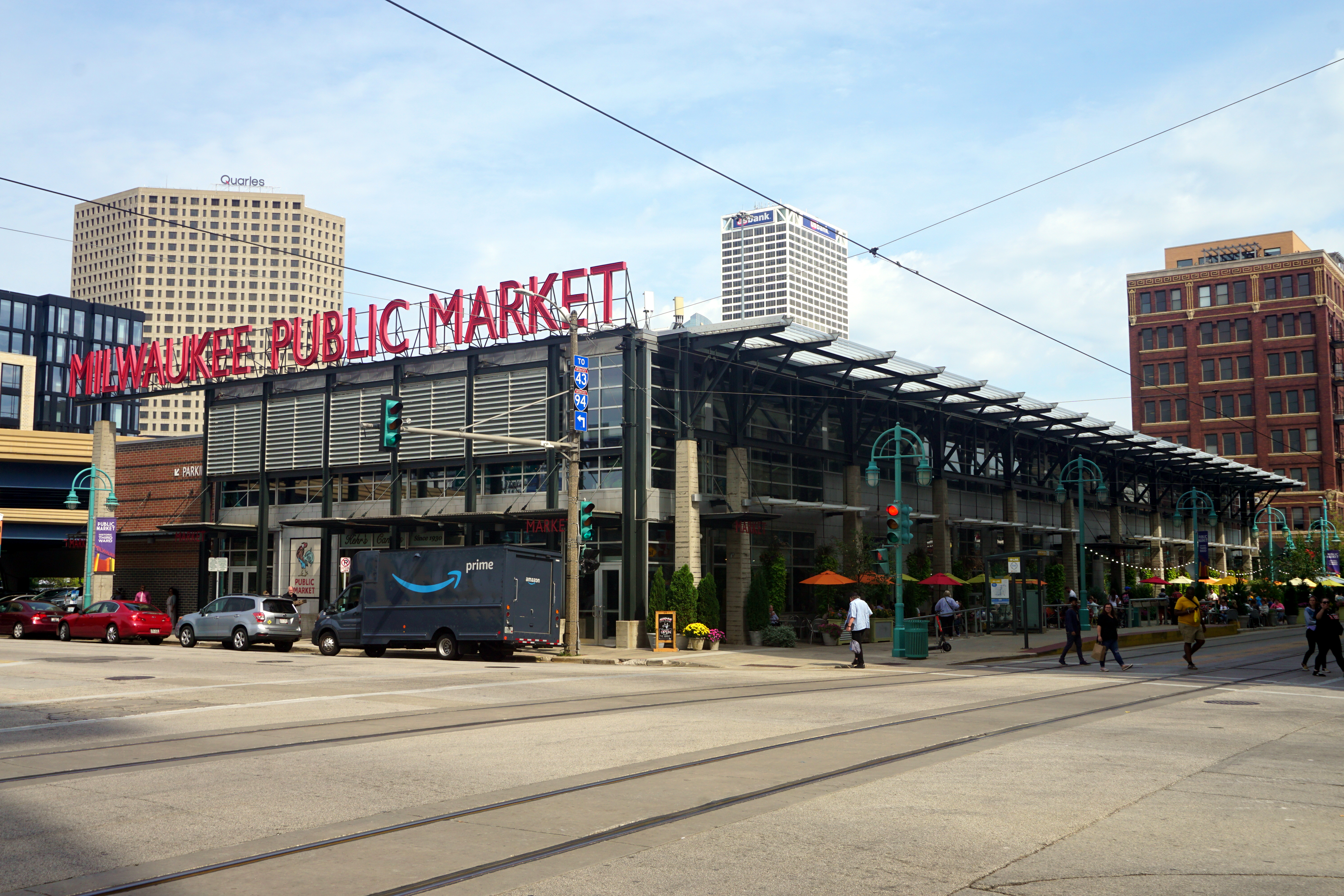
Milwaukee Public Market

Milwaukee Public Market, in the Third Ward neighborhood, is an indoor market that sells produce, seafood, meats, cheeses, vegetables, candies, and flowers from local businesses. It opened in 2005 and drew inspiration from Pike Place Market in Seattle, envisioning a space to support local vendors.

Milwaukee County Farmers Markets, held in season, sell fresh produce, meats, cheeses, jams, jellies, preserves and syrups, and plants. Farmers markets also feature artists and craftspeople. Locations include: Aur Farmers Market, Brown Deer Farmers Market, Cudahy Farmers Market, East Town Farm Market, Enderis Park Farmers Market, Fondy Farmers Market, Mitchell Street Market, Riverwest Gardeners' Market, Silver Spring Farmers Market, South Milwaukee Farmers Market, South Shore Farmers Market, Uptown Farmers Market, Wauwatosa Farmers Market, West Allis Farmers Market, and Westown Market on the Park.

== Government and politics ==
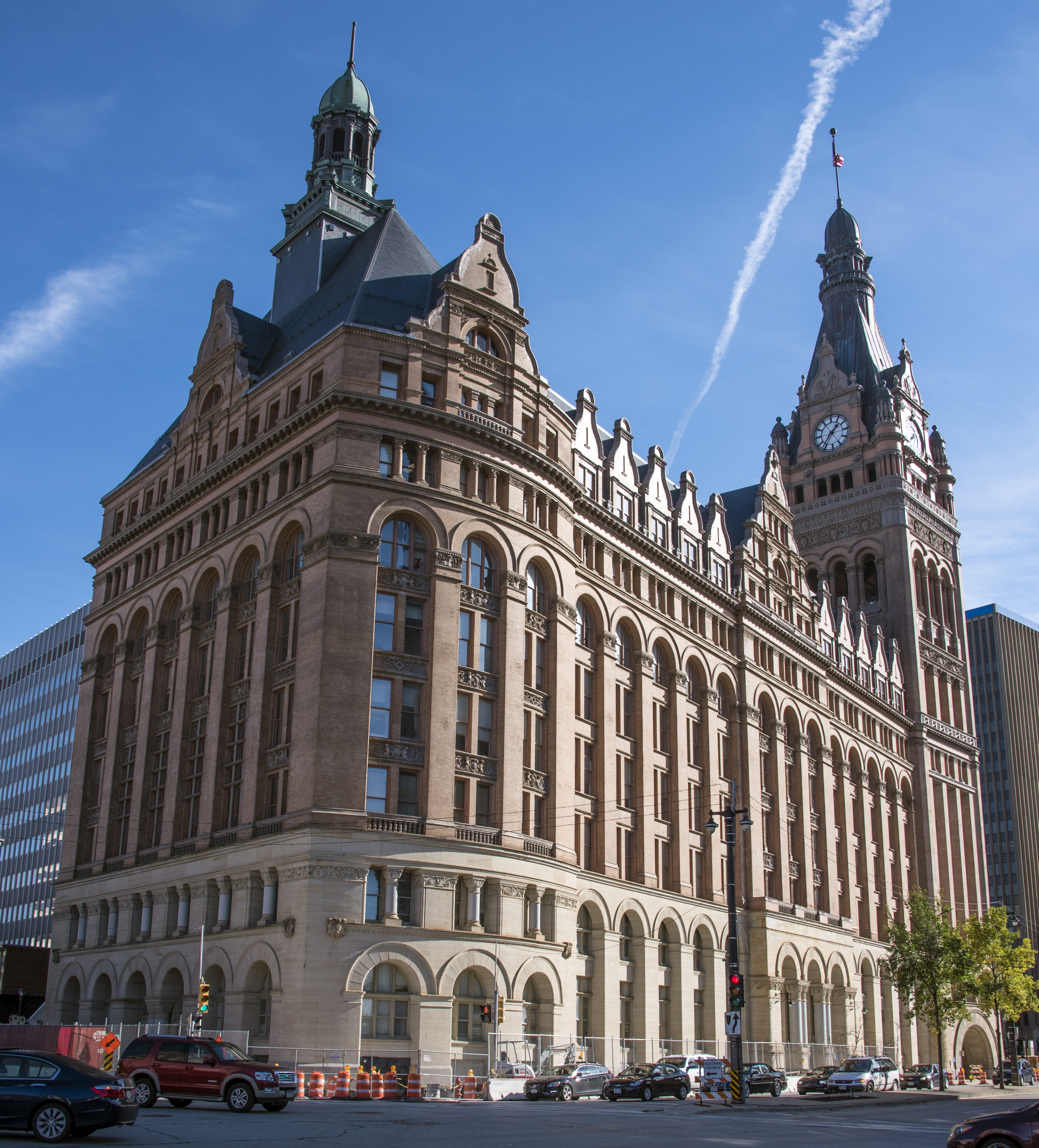
Milwaukee City Hall was built in 1895 and based on German counterparts.

Milwaukee has a mayor-council form of government. With the election of Mayor John O. Norquist in 1988, the city adopted a cabinet form of government with the mayor appointing department heads not otherwise elected or appointed—notably the Fire and Police Chiefs. While this gave the mayor greater control of the city's day-to-day operations, the Common Council retains almost complete control over the city's finances and the mayor, with the exception of his proposed annual budget, cannot directly introduce legislation. The Common Council consists of 15 members, one from each district in the city, who serve a 4-year term.

Milwaukee has a history of giving long tenures to its mayors; from Frank Zeidler to current mayor Cavalier Johnson, the city has had only five elected mayors (and one acting) since 1948. When 28-year incumbent Henry Maier retired in 1988, he held the record for longest term of service for a city of Milwaukee's size, and when Tom Barrett retired in 2021, he was the longest-serving mayor of any of the United States' 50 largest cities.

In addition to the election of a Mayor and Common Council on the city level, Milwaukee residents elect county representatives to the Milwaukee County Board of Supervisors, as well as a Milwaukee County Executive. The current County Executive is David Crowley, who was reelected in 2024 after being first elected to the position in 2020.

Milwaukee has been a Democratic stronghold for more than a century at the federal level. At the local level, Socialists often won the mayorship and (for briefer periods) other city and county offices during much of the first sixty years of the 20th century. The city is split between seven State Senate districts, each of which is divided between three state Assembly districts. All but four state legislators representing the city are Democrats; the four Republicans—two in the State Assembly and two in the State Senate—represent outer portions of the city that are part of districts dominated by heavily Republican suburban counties. In 2008, Barack Obama won Milwaukee with 77% of the vote. Tim Carpenter (D), Lena Taylor (D), Robyn Vining (D), LaTonya Johnson (D), Chris Larson (D), Alberta Darling (R), and Dave Craig (R) represent Milwaukee in the State Senate; Daniel Riemer (D), JoCasta Zamarripa (D), Marisabel Cabrera (D), David Bowen (D), Jason Fields (D), LaKeshia Myers (D), Sara Rodriguez (D), Dale P. Kooyenga (R), Kalan Haywood (D), David Crowley (D), Evan Goyke (D), Jonathan Brostoff (D), Christine Sinicki (D), Janel Brandtjen (R), and Mike Kuglitsch (R) represent Milwaukee in the State Assembly.

Milwaukee makes up the overwhelming majority of Wisconsin's 4th congressional district. The district is heavily Democratic, with victory in the Democratic primary often being considered tantamount to election. The district is currently represented by Democrat Gwen Moore. A Republican has not represented a significant portion of Milwaukee in Congress since Charles J. Kersten lost his seat in the 5th district in 1954 to Democrat Henry S. Reuss. The small portions of the city extending into Waukesha and Washington counties are part of the 5th District, represented by Republican Scott L. Fitzgerald.

Milwaukee's Mexican Consulate serves 65 counties in Wisconsin and the Upper Peninsula of Michigan.

=== Crime ===
In 2001 and 2007, Milwaukee ranked among the ten most dangerous large cities in the United States. Despite its improvement since then, as of 2012 Milwaukee fared worse when comparing specific crime types to the national average (e.g., homicide, rape, robbery, aggravated assault) The Milwaukee Police Department's Gang Unit was reactivated in 2004 after Nannette Hegerty was sworn in as chief. In 2006, 4,000 charges were brought against suspects through Milwaukee's Gang Unit. In 2013 there were 105 murders in Milwaukee and 87 homicides the following year. In 2015, 146 people were killed in the city. In 2020, Milwaukee was ranked the tenth most dangerous city in the US. In 2022, Milwaukee set a homicide record with 214 homicides.

=== Poverty ===
As of 2016, Milwaukee currently ranks as the second poorest U.S. city with over 500,000 residents, falling behind only Detroit. In 2013, a Point-In-Time survey estimated 1,500 people were homeless on Milwaukee's streets each night, although as of 2022 the estimate has reduced to 832. The city's homeless and poor are aided by several local nonprofits, including the Milwaukee Rescue Mission.

=== Election results ===
Milwaukee city vote by party in presidential elections
| Year | Democratic | Republican | Third Parties |
|---|---|---|---|
| 2024 | 77.32% 191,397 | 20.88% 51,691 | 1.79% 4,442 |
| 2020 | 78.83% 194,661 | 19.60% 48,414 | 1.57% 3,875 |
| 2016 | 76.55% 188,657 | 18.43% 45,411 | 5.02% 12,377 |
| 2012 | 79.27% 227,384 | 19.72% 56,553 | 1.01% 2,896 |
| 2008 | 77.82% 213,436 | 21.03% 57,665 | 1.15% 3,152 |
| 2004 | 71.83% 198,907 | 27.35% 75,746 | 0.82% 2,268 |

== Education ==
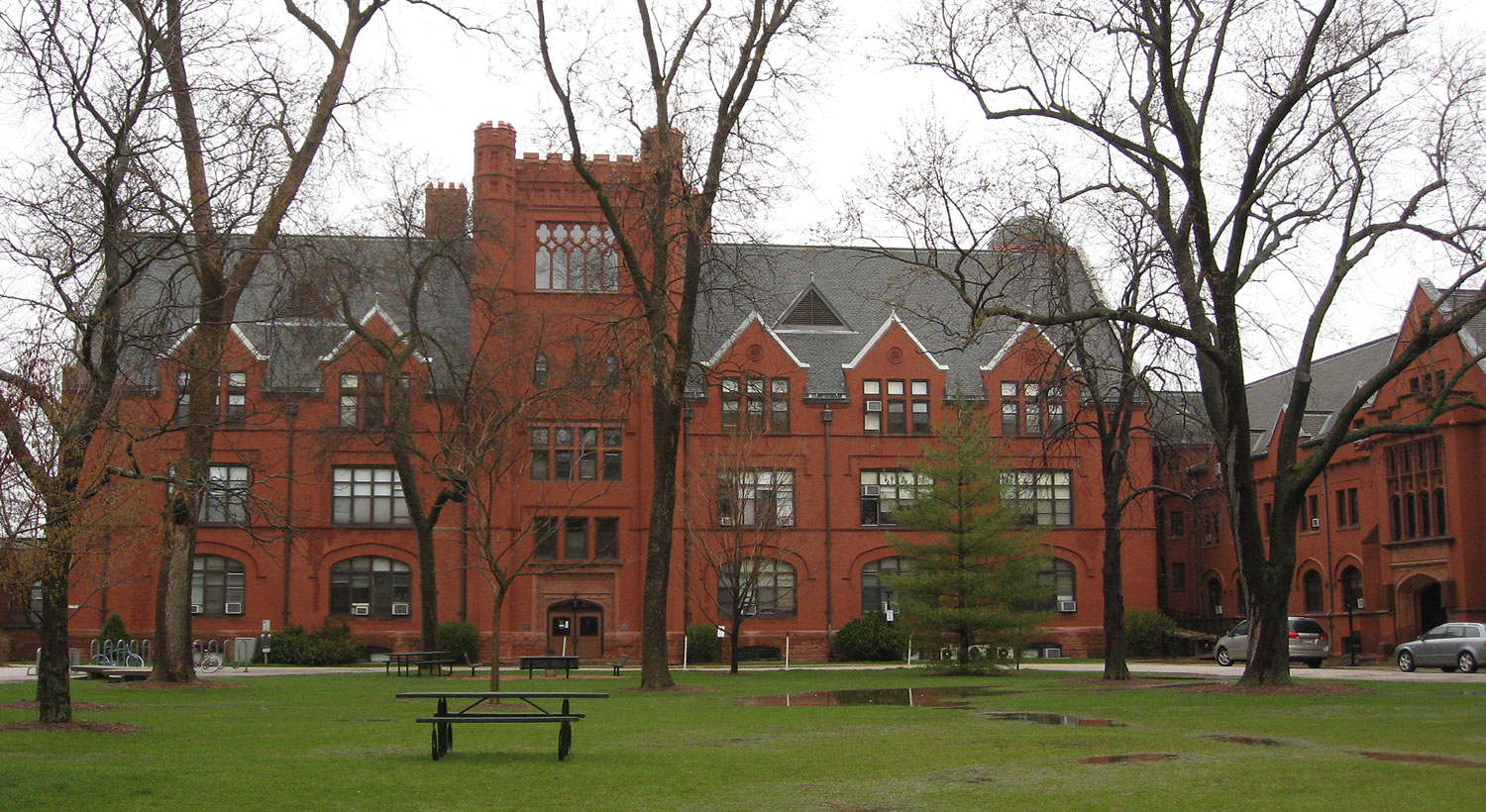
The University of Wisconsin–Milwaukee in Downer Woods is the largest university in the city.

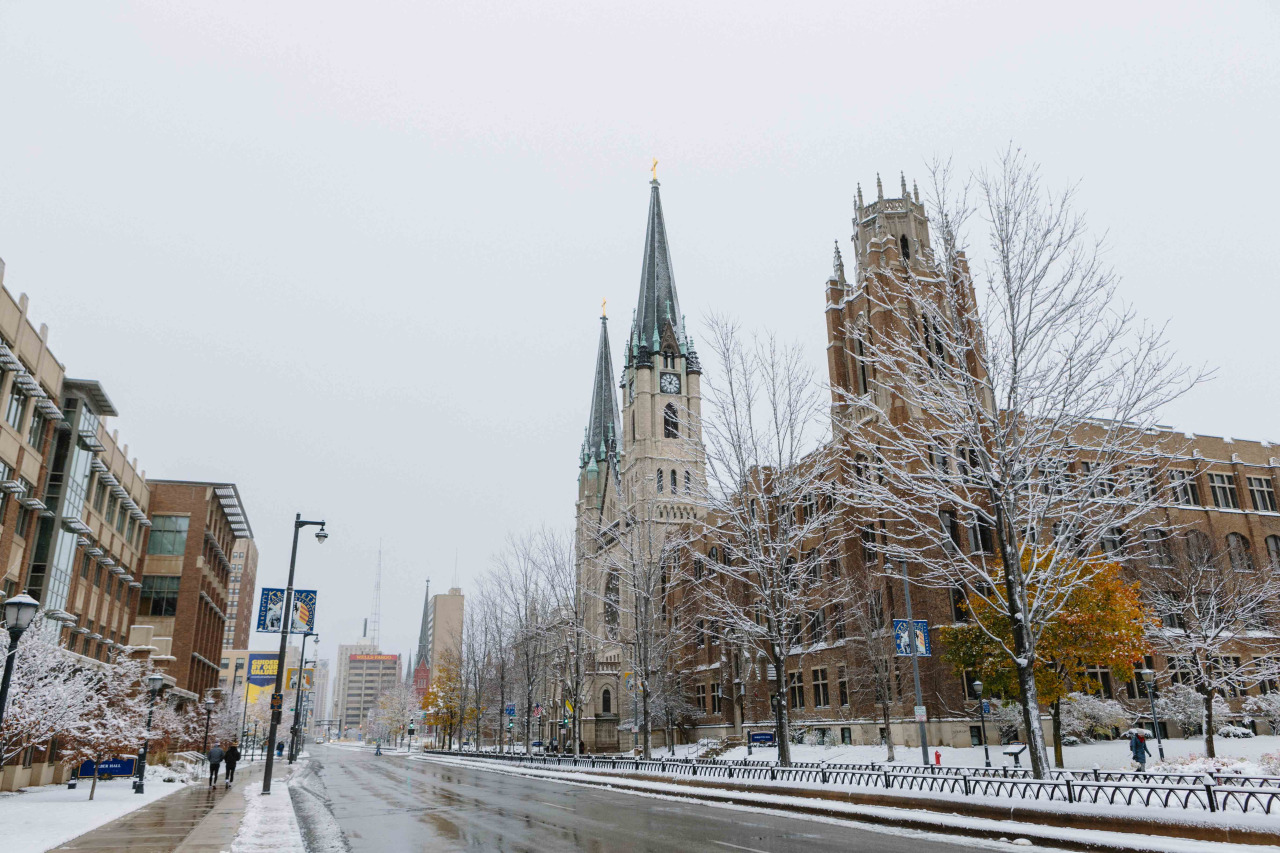
Near downtown, Marquette University is Wisconsin's largest private university by enrollment.

Of persons in Milwaukee aged 25 and above, 89.2% have a high school diploma and 32.4% have a bachelor's degree or higher.

=== Primary and secondary education ===
Milwaukee Public Schools (MPS) includes almost all of the city of Milwaukee. It is the largest school district in Wisconsin and among the largest in the nation; it had an enrollment of 69,115 as of the 2021-2022 academic year. Milwaukee Public Schools operate as magnet schools, with individualized specialty areas for interests in academics or the arts. The district operates 156 schools, including 18 high schools.

Milwaukee is also home to over two dozen private or parochial high schools and numerous private middle and elementary schools. Eight high schools are operated by the Roman Catholic Archdiocese of Milwaukee. In 1990, Milwaukee became the first city in the United States to offer a school voucher program.

=== Higher education ===
The University of Wisconsin–Milwaukee is a public research university in the Downer Woods neighborhood and the largest college or university in the city. Marquette University, a private Jesuit institution near downtown Milwaukee founded in 1881, is the state's largest private college. Discipline-specific institutions include the Medical College of Wisconsin, Milwaukee Institute of Art and Design and Milwaukee School of Engineering. The public Milwaukee Area Technical College provides technical and vocational education. Women's colleges include Alverno College and Mount Mary University. Other higher education institutions in the city and its suburbs include Bryant & Stratton College, Carroll University, Concordia University Wisconsin, Herzing University, Nashotah House, Saint Francis de Sales Seminary and Wisconsin Lutheran College.

== Media ==
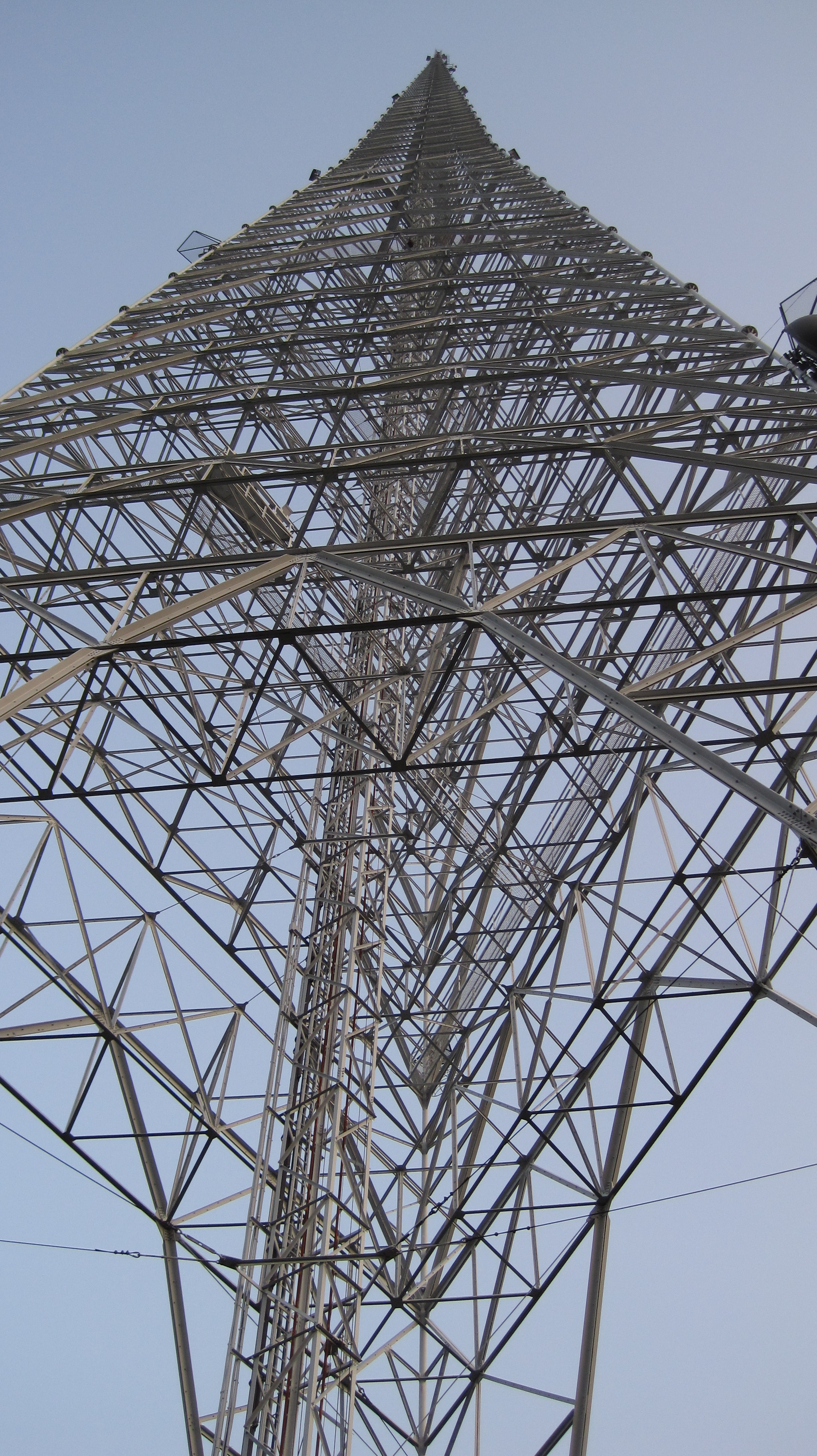
The WITI TV Tower is in Shorewood, off of the Oak Leaf Trail, just north of Capitol Drive.

Milwaukee's daily newspaper is the Milwaukee Journal Sentinel, which was formed when the morning paper the Milwaukee Sentinel merged with the afternoon paper Milwaukee Journal. The city has two free distribution alternative publications, Shepherd Express and Wisconsin Gazette. Other local newspapers, city guides, and magazines with large distributions include Milwaukee Magazine, Milwaukee Neighborhood News Service, Milwaukee Independent, Riverwest Currents, The Milwaukee Courier and Milwaukee Community Journal. Urban Milwaukee and OnMilwaukee.com are online-only publications providing political and real-estate news as well as stories about cultural events and entertainment. The UWM Post is the independent, student-run weekly at the University of Wisconsin–Milwaukee.

Milwaukee's major network television affiliates are WTMJ 4 (NBC), WITI 6 (Fox), WISN 12 (ABC), WVTV 18/24 (CW/MyNetworkTV), and WDJT 58 (CBS). Spanish-language programming is on WTSJ-LD 38 (Visión Latina) and WYTU-LD 63 (Telemundo). Milwaukee's public broadcasting stations are WMVS 10 and WMVT 36.

Other television stations in the Milwaukee market include WMKE-CD 7 (Quest), WVCY 30 (FN), WBME-CD 41 (Me-TV), WMLW-TV 49 (Independent), WWRS 52 (TBN), Sportsman Channel, and WPXE 55 (ION)

There are numerous radio stations throughout Milwaukee and the surrounding area.

There are two cable PEG channels in Milwaukee: channels 13 and 25.

Until 2015, Journal Communications (a NYSE-traded corporation) published the Journal Sentinel and well over a dozen local weekly newspapers in the metropolitan area. At that time, Journal was split into the Journal Media Group for publishing, while the television and radio stations went to the E. W. Scripps Company (Journal founded WTMJ-TV, along with WTMJ and WKTI). As a result, it was criticized for having a near-monopoly in local news coverage. Journal Media Group merged with Gannett in 2016, while Scripps sold the radio stations in 2018 to Good Karma Brands, effectively splitting off the monopoly completely.

The city is the home of Red Letter Media, independent filmmakers responsible for such works as Space Cop.

== Infrastructure ==
=== Health care ===
Milwaukee's health care industry includes several health systems. The Milwaukee Regional Medical Complex, between 8700 and 9200 West Wisconsin Avenue, is on the Milwaukee County grounds. This area includes the Children's Hospital of Wisconsin, Froedtert Hospital, BloodCenter of Wisconsin, the Ronald McDonald House, Curative Rehabilitation, and the Medical College of Wisconsin. Aurora Health Care includes St. Luke's Medical Center, Aurora Sinai Medical Center, Aurora West Allis Medical Center, and St. Luke's SouthShore. Ascension includes St. Joseph's Hospital, St. Francis Hospital, St. Mary's Hospital, The Wisconsin Heart Hospital, Elmbrook Memorial (Brookfield), and other outpatient clinics in the Milwaukee area. The Medical College of Wisconsin is one of two medical schools in Wisconsin and the only one in Milwaukee.

Other health care non-profit organizations in Milwaukee include national headquarters of the American Academy of Allergy, Asthma, and Immunology and the Endometriosis Association.

=== Transportation ===
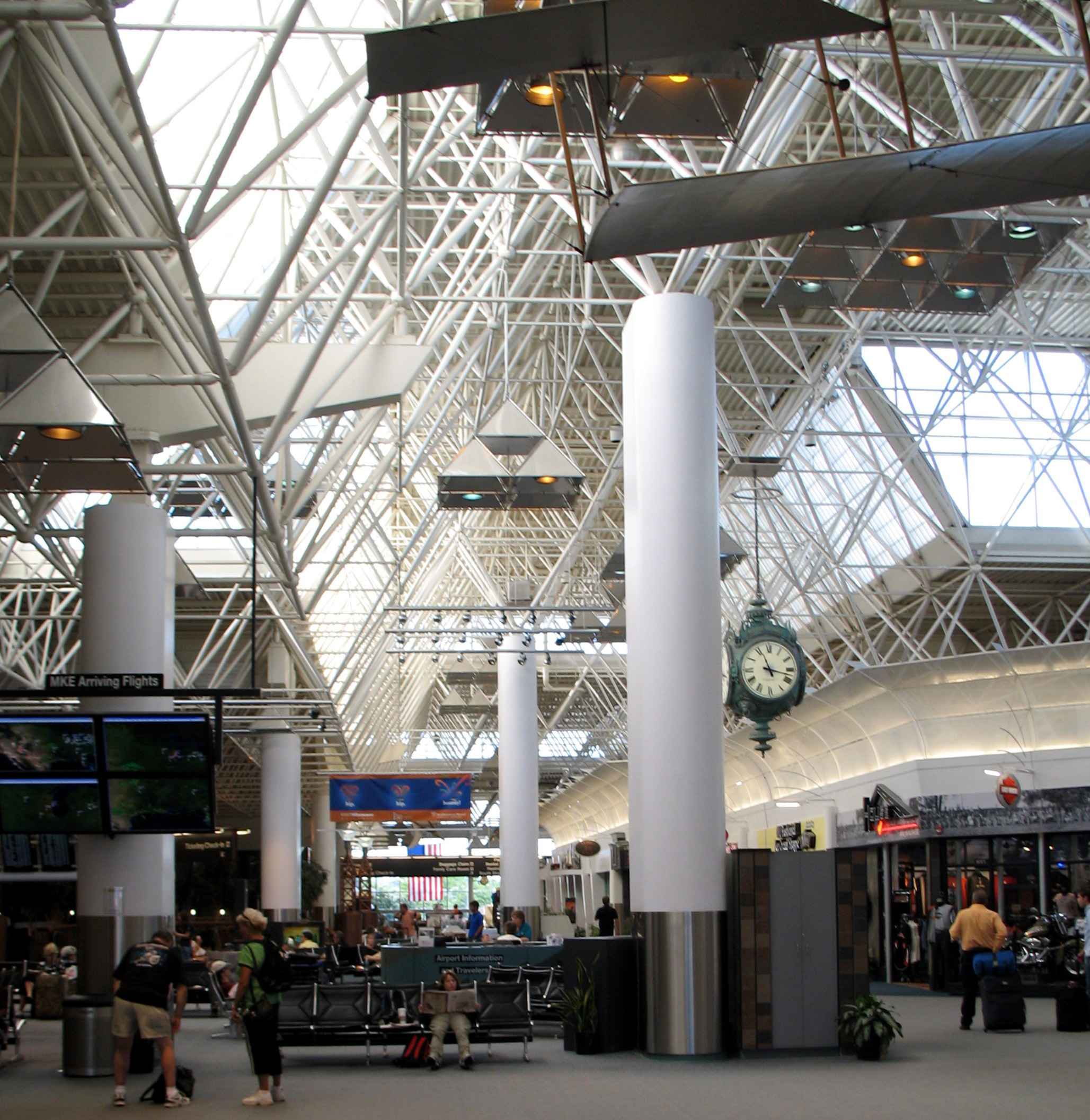
Main terminal at Milwaukee Mitchell International Airport

According to the 2022 American Community Survey, 66% of working city of Milwaukee residents commuted by driving alone, 11.1% carpooled, 4.5% used public transportation, and 4.3% walked. About 2% used all other forms of transportation, including taxicab, motorcycle, and bicycle. About 12.1% of working city of Milwaukee residents worked at home. In 2015, 17.9% of city of Milwaukee households were without a car, which increased to 18.7% in 2016. The national average was 8.7 percent in 2016. Milwaukee averaged 1.3 cars per household in 2016, compared to a national average of 1.8 per household.

A 2015 study by Walk Score ranked Milwaukee as the 15th most walkable out of the 50 largest U.S. cities. As a whole, the city has a score of 62 out of 100. However, several of the more densely populated neighborhoods have much higher scores: Juneautown has a score of 95; the Lower East Side has a score of 91; Yankee Hill scored 91; and the Marquette and Murray Hill neighborhoods both scored 89 each. Those ratings range from "A Walker's Paradise" to "Very Walkable."

==== Airports ====
Milwaukee has two airports. Milwaukee Mitchell International Airport (KMKE) on the southern edge of the city handles the region's commercial traffic and is categorized as a medium-hub primary commercial service facility. Lawrence J. Timmerman Airport (KMWC), known locally as Timmerman Field, is on the northwest side of the city and is categorized as a regional reliever airport facility, used mainly for general or private aviation.

Mitchell International has one terminal with two concourses and 38 gates. Its peak year of annual traffic was 9.8 million passengers in 2010; the airport served 6.3 million annual passengers in 2024. Mitchell is served by twelve airlines, which offer roughly 240 daily departures and 245 daily arrivals. Approximately 90 cities are served directly from Mitchell International. It is the largest airport in Wisconsin. The airport is connected to the Amtrak Hiawatha train service.

==== Intercity rail and bus ====
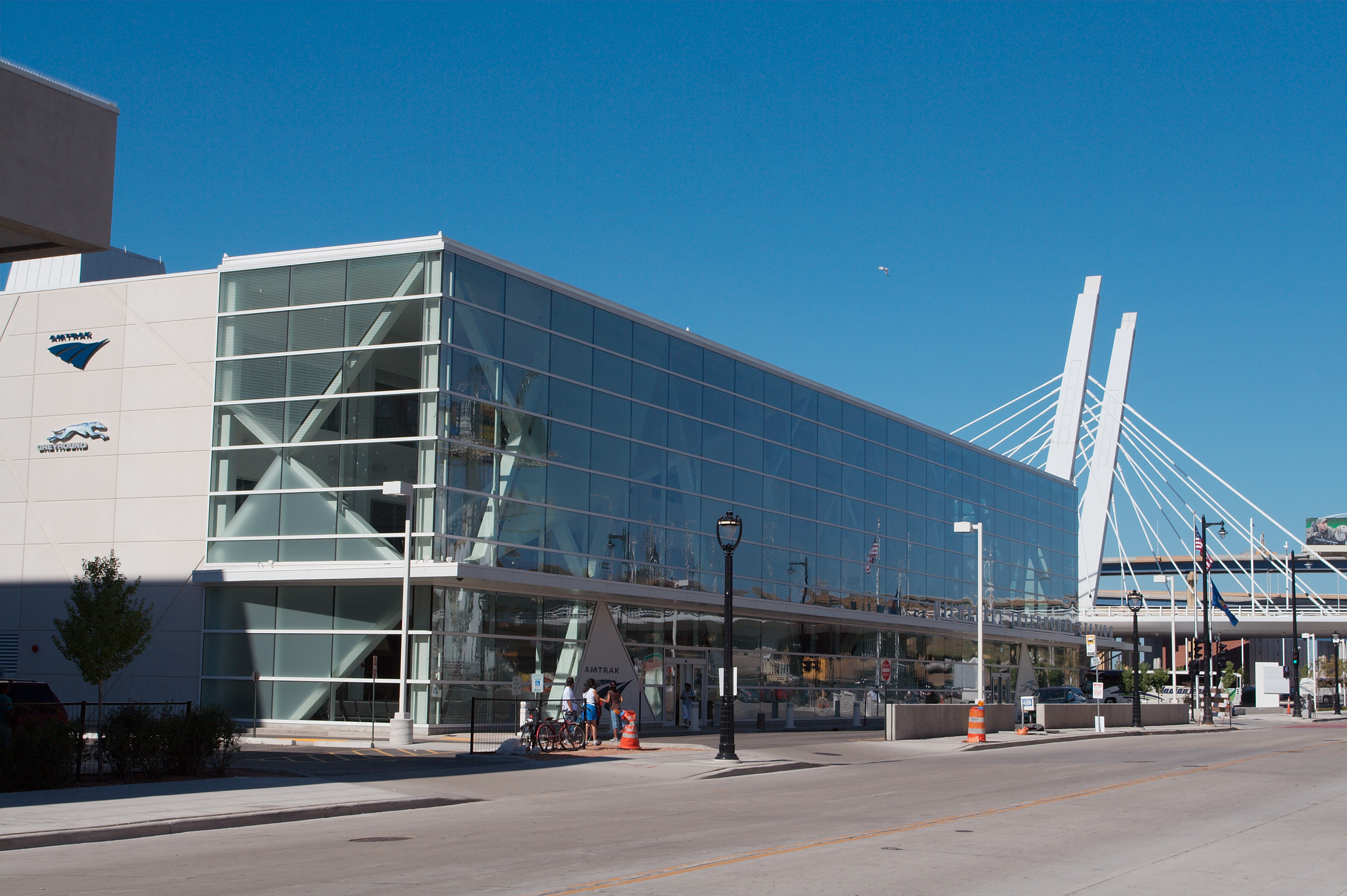
Milwaukee Intermodal Station is the city's intercity bus and train station.

Milwaukee's Amtrak station was renovated in 2007 to create Milwaukee Intermodal Station near downtown Milwaukee and the Third Ward. The station replaced the previous main railway station, Everett Street Depot, to improve access between Milwaukee's local transit and Amtrak riders. Milwaukee is served by Amtrak's Hiawatha passenger train up to seven times daily between Milwaukee Intermodal Station and Chicago Union Station. The Borealis provides daily service to Chicago and Saint Paul, Minnesota, and is supplemental to the long-distance cross-country Empire Builder, connecting Milwaukee to Portland, Oregon and Seattle, Washington.

In 2010, $800 million in federal funds were allocated to the creation of high-speed rail links from Milwaukee to Chicago and Madison, but the funds were rejected by Wisconsin governor Scott Walker. In 2016, WisDOT and IDOT conducted studies to upgrade service on the Amtrak Hiawatha line from seven to ten times daily between downtown Milwaukee and downtown Chicago. As a result of the 2021 infrastructure bill and the "Amtrak Connects Us" initiative, the Milwaukee Intermodal Station is again projected to serve passenger trains to Madison and Green Bay, with the goal of the new routes being operational by 2035.

Intercity bus services to the city include Amtrak Thruway, Badger Bus, Flixbus, Greyhound Lines, Indian Trails, Jefferson Lines, Lamers Bus Lines, Megabus, Wisconsin Coach Lines and other intercity bus operators.

==== Transit ====
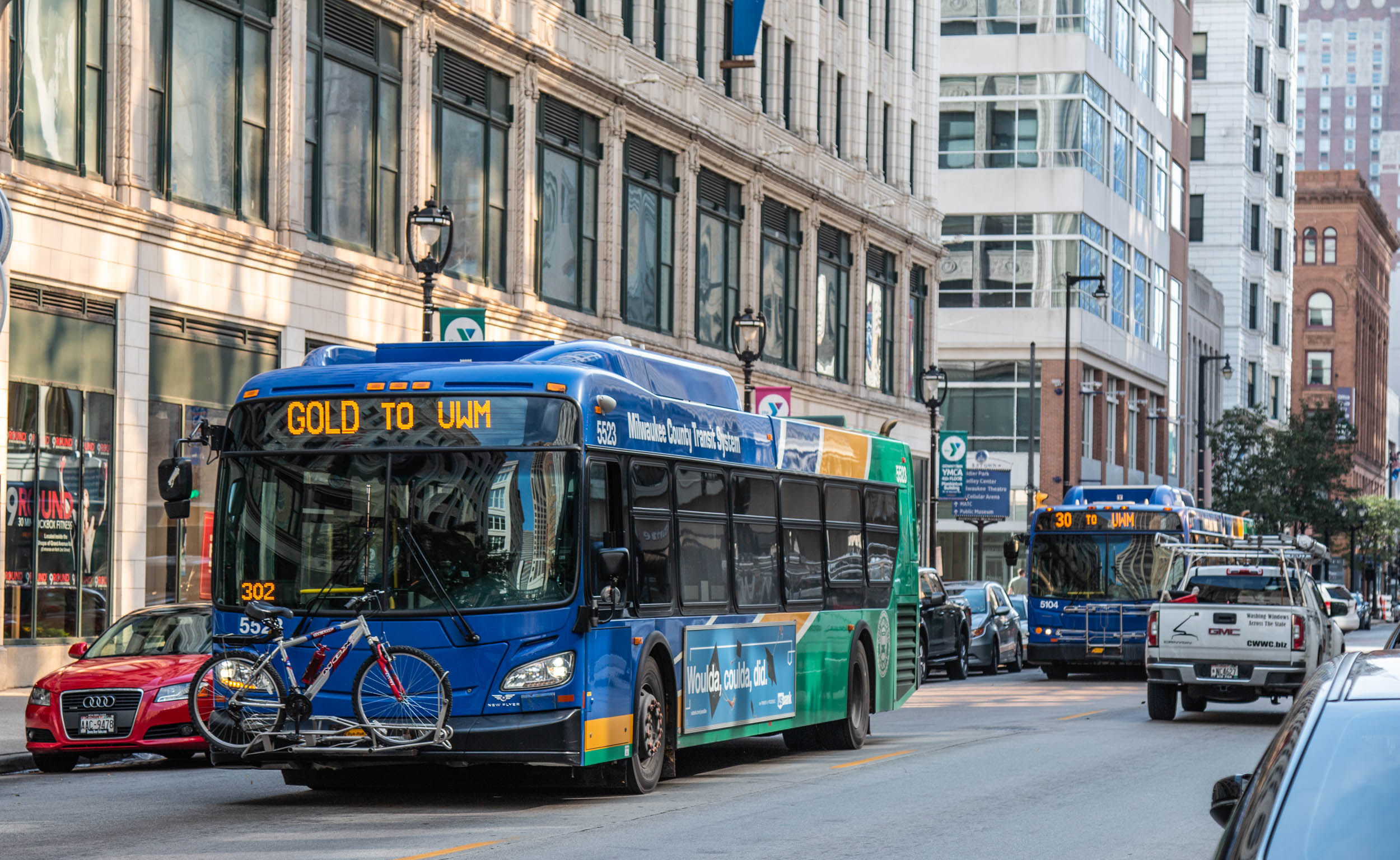
Milwaukee County Transit System buses

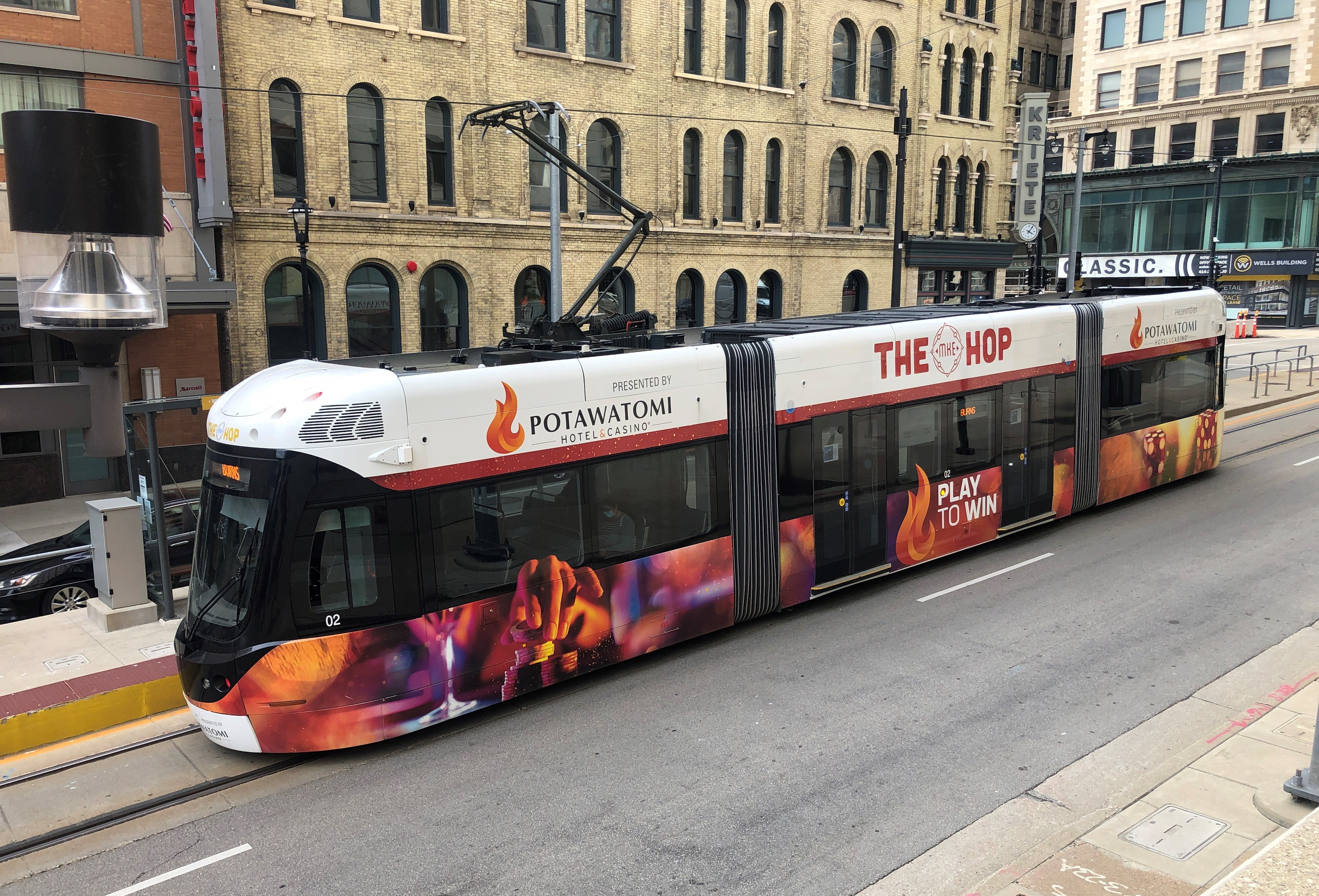
The Hop streetcar system

The Milwaukee County Transit System provides bus services within Milwaukee County. The Badger Bus station in downtown Milwaukee provides bus service between Milwaukee and Madison. MCTS's Connect 1 East/West Bus Rapid Transit (BRT) line between downtown and the Milwaukee Regional Medical Center is also available.

Milwaukee's streetcar system, The Hop, connects Milwaukee Intermodal Station, downtown Milwaukee, and Ogden Avenue on the city's Lower East Side. The initial M-Line opened for service on November 2, 2018. Service to the lakefront, through the Couture, on the L-Line opened on October 29, 2023.

Milwaukee has no commuter rail system. Previous efforts to develop one proposed a 0.5% sales tax in Milwaukee, Racine and Kenosha counties to fund an expansion of Metra's Union Pacific North Line to Milwaukee Intermodal Station. A 1990s Wisconsin DOT plan determined the path forward for east-west transportation in Milwaukee to be a mix of a comprehensive light rail system, an expansion of I-94 with HOV lanes, and increased bus service to Waukesha County. Despite being awarded $289 million for this plan from the federal government, local Republican leaders rescinded support for light rail. The "locally preferred alternative" would have connected destinations including downtown Milwaukee, UW-Milwaukee, and the Milwaukee Regional Medical Center.

==== Highways ====
Three of Wisconsin's Interstate highways intersect in Milwaukee. Interstate 94 (I-94) comes north from Chicago to enter Milwaukee and continues west to Madison. The stretch of I-94 from Seven Mile Road to the Marquette Interchange in Downtown Milwaukee is known as the North-South Freeway. I-94 from downtown Milwaukee west to Wisconsin 16 is known as the East-West Freeway.

I-43 enters Milwaukee from Beloit in the southwest and continues north along Lake Michigan to Green Bay via Sheboygan and Manitowoc. I-43 southwest of I-41/I-894/US 41/US 45 Hale Interchange is known as the Rock Freeway. I-43 is cosigned with I-894 East and I-41/US 41 South to I-94 is known as the Airport Freeway. At I-94, I-43 follows I-94 to the Marquette Interchange. I-43 continues north known as the North-South Freeway to Wisconsin Highway 57 near Port Washington.

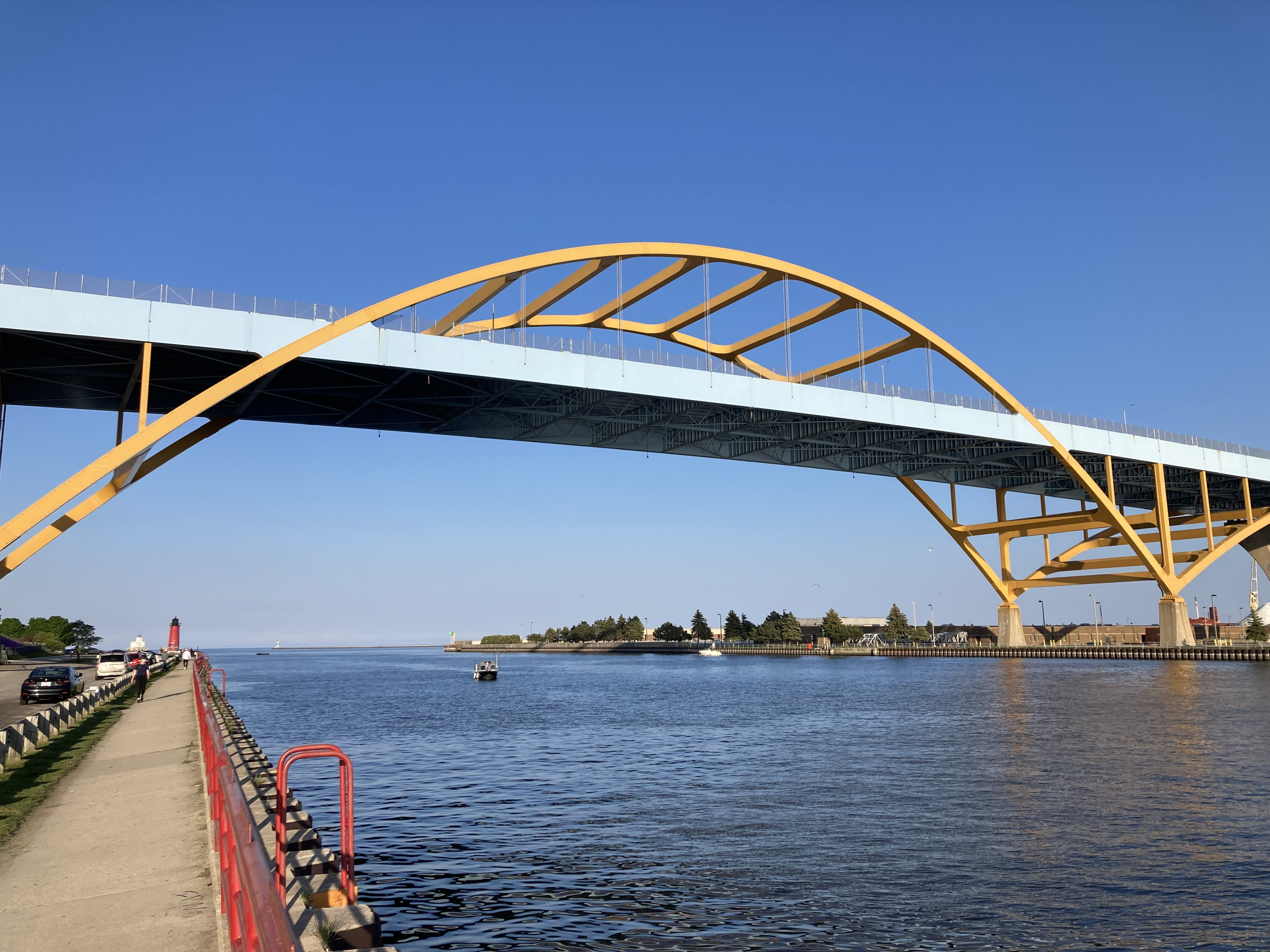
The Hoan Bridge carries Interstate 794.

Approved in 2015, Interstate 41 follows I-94 north from the state line before turning west at the Mitchell Interchange to the Hale Interchange and then north to Green Bay via Fond du Lac, Oshkosh and Appleton. I-41/US 41/US 45 from the Hale Interchange to Wisconsin Hwy 145 is known as the Zoo Freeway.

Milwaukee has two auxiliary Interstate Highways, I-894 and I-794. I-894 bypasses downtown Milwaukee on the west and south sides of the city from the Zoo Interchange to the Mitchell Interchange. I-894 is part of the Zoo Freeway and the Airport Freeway. I-794 extends east from the Marquette Interchange to Lake Michigan before turning south over the Hoan Bridge toward Milwaukee Mitchell International Airport, turning into Highway 794 along the way. This is known as the Lake Freeway.

Milwaukee is also served by three US Highways. U.S. Highway 18 (US 18) provides a link from downtown to points west heading to Waukesha along Wells Street, 17th/16th Streets, Highland Avenue, 35th Street, Wisconsin Avenue, and Blue Mound Road. US 41 and US 45 both provide north–south freeway transportation on the western side of the city. The freeway system in Milwaukee carries roughly 25% of all travel in Wisconsin. Milwaukee County is also served by several Wisconsin highways, namely 24, 32, 36, 38, 57, 59, 100, 119, 145, 175, 181, 190, 241, and 794.

==== Bicycling ====
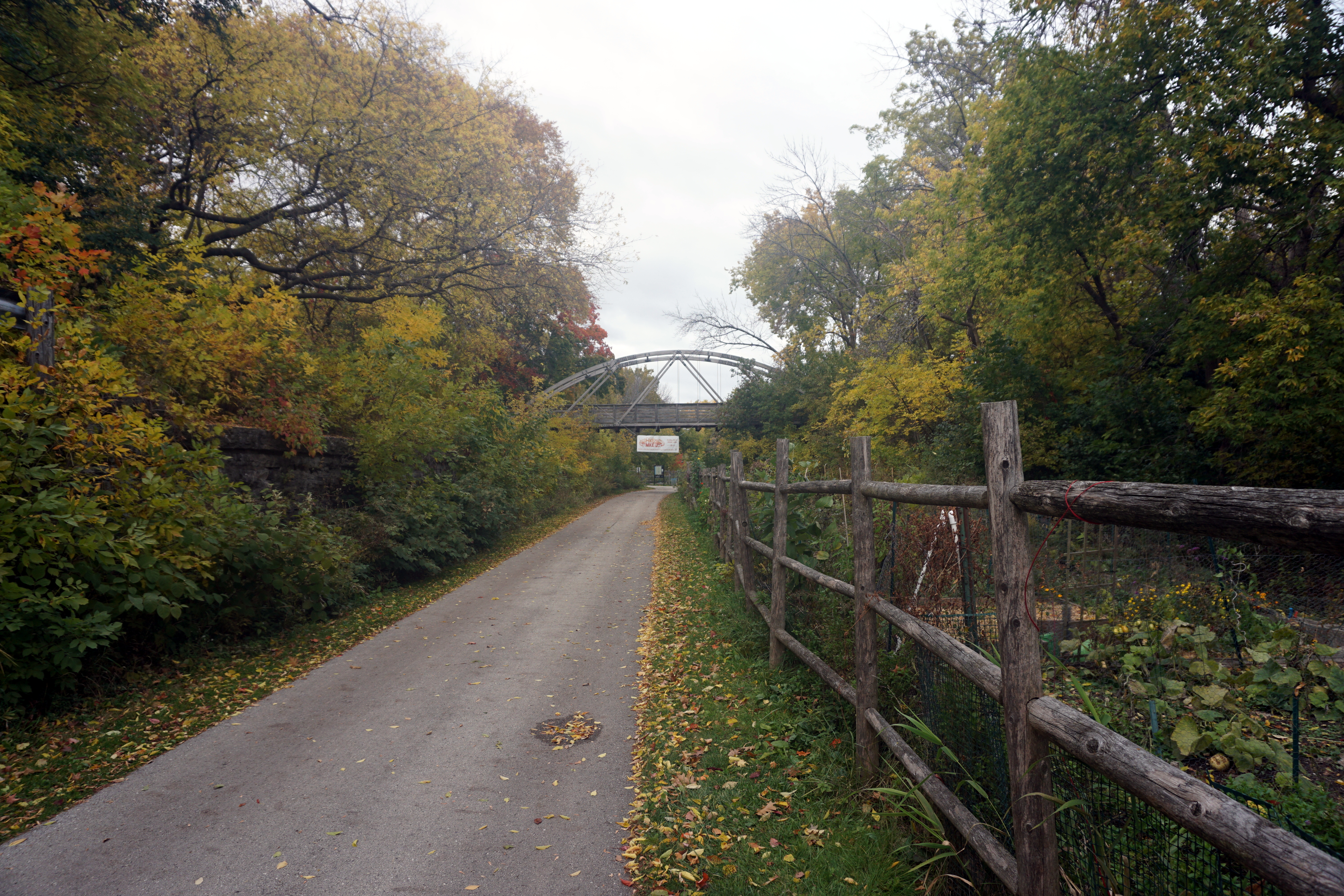
The Oak Leaf Trail, pictured on the East Side, connects parks in the Milwaukee County Park System.

As of 2022, Milwaukee has 195 miles (314 km) of on-street bicycle facilities, including various kinds of bicycle lanes, bicycle boulevards, and trails. In the following year, the city set a goal of increasing their protected bicycle lanes from 2.6 miles (4.2 km) to 50 miles (80 km) by 2026.

In 2006, Milwaukee obtained bronze-level status from the League of American Bicyclists, a rarity for a city its size, then silver-level status in 2019.

The Bicycle Federation of Wisconsin holds an annual Bike to Work Week. The event, held in May each year, has frequently featured a commuter race between a car, a bus, and a bike; and also a morning ride into work with the mayor.

In 2008, the city identified over 250 miles (400 km) of streets on which bike lanes will fit. It created a plan labeling 145 miles (233 km) of those as high priority for receiving bike lanes. As part of the city's Bicycle and Pedestrian Task Force's mission to "make Milwaukee more bicycle and pedestrian friendly", as of 2008, over 700 bike racks have been installed throughout the city. Since October 2018, when it enacted a complete streets policy, the city continuously considers the addition of bicycle facilities to roadways as part of new road projects.

In 2009, the Milwaukee County Transit System began installing bicycle racks to the front of county buses. This "green" effort was part of a settlement of an asbestos lawsuit filed by the state against the county in 2006. The lawsuit cites the release of asbestos into the environment when the Courthouse Annex was demolished.

In August 2014, Milwaukee debuted a bicycle sharing system called Bublr Bikes, which is a partnership between the City of Milwaukee and a local non-profit, Midwest Bike Share (dba Bublr Bikes). As of August 2023, the system operates over 100 stations in the city and neighboring West Allis and Wauwatosa.

==== Water ====
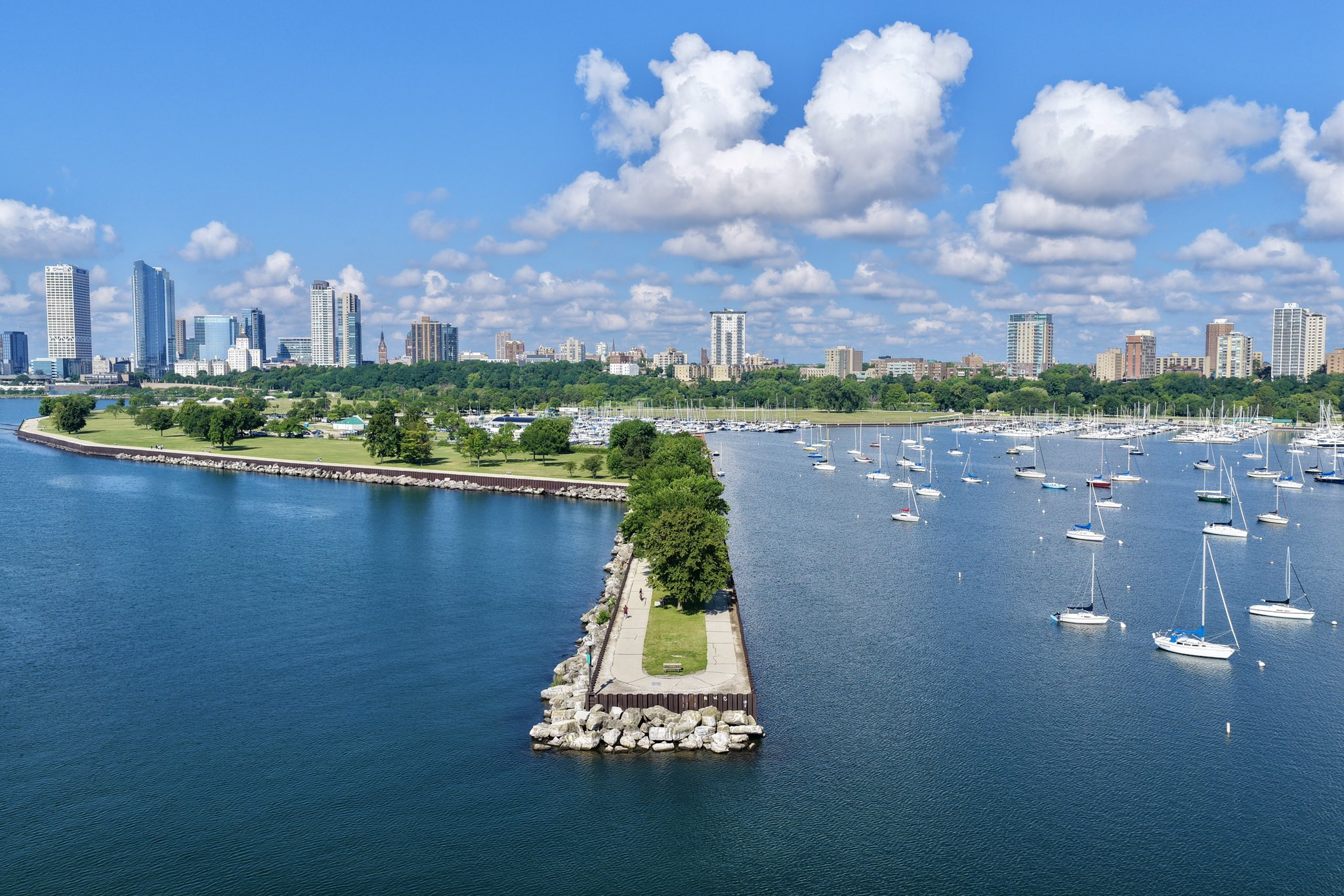
McKinley Marina

Milwaukee's main port, the Port of Milwaukee, handled 2.3 million metric tons of cargo through its municipal port in 2022. Commodities handled include salt, steel, limestone, general cargoes, over-dimensional cargoes, grain, fertilizers, biodiesel, and ethanol. The port is a key ferry and cruise ship destination on Lake Michigan. It is home to the Lake Express ferry, which offers service from Milwaukee to Muskegon, Michigan. The United States Coast Guard Sector Lake Michigan is based at the port. McKinley Marina is the city's only public marina.

=== City development ===
On February 10, 2015, a streetcar connecting the Milwaukee Intermodal Station with the city's Lower East Side was approved by the Common Council, bringing decades of sometimes acrimonious debate to a pause. On a 9–6 vote, the council approved a measure that established the project's $124 million capital budget, its estimated $3.2 million operating and maintenance budget and its 2.5-mile (4.0 km) route, which includes a lakefront spur connecting the line to the proposed $122 million, 44-story Couture. Construction on the Milwaukee Streetcar began March 2017, with initial operation by mid-2018. This project was later named to The Hop, and became a free transit system. The Lakefront service was expected to start operation by 2019.

In 2024, Architectural Digest rated Milwaukee's skyline as the 15th most beautiful skyline in the world. Part of that skyline includes the Northwestern Mutual Tower and Commons stands 550 feet (170 m) tall and has 32 stories, making it the second tallest building in Milwaukee.

Fiserv Forum, a new multipurpose arena at 1111 Vel R. Phillips Avenue, has been built to accommodate the Milwaukee Bucks and Marquette Golden Eagles, as well as college and professional ice hockey games. Construction on the $524 million project began in November 2015 and opened to the public on August 26, 2018. The arena is intended to be the focal point of a "live block" zone that includes public space surrounded by both commercial and residential developments. The arena has a transparent facade and a curved roof and side that is meant to evoke the water forms of nearby Lake Michigan and the Milwaukee River.

== In popular culture ==
- The American sitcom Happy Days was set in Milwaukee and ran for 11 seasons from 1974 to 1984, becoming one of the most successful sitcoms in American television history. It presented an idealized vision of life in the 1950s and early-1960s Midwestern United States.
- The American sitcom, Laverne & Shirley, a spin-off of Happy Days, which played for eight seasons on ABC from January 27, 1976, to May 10, 1983, followed the lives of Laverne DeFazio and Shirley Feeney, two friends and roommates who work as bottle-cappers in the fictitious Shotz Brewery in late 1950s Milwaukee.
- The 2004 sports comedy film, Mr. 3000, takes place in Milwaukee and features actor Bernie Mac as a member of the Milwaukee Brewers.
- In the 1992 movie, Wayne's World, the two main characters, Wayne and Garth, meet rock star Alice Cooper after a show in Milwaukee. Cooper engages in a discussion with them and his band about Milwaukee and where the city's name comes from.
- The 2011 comedy film Bridesmaids starring Kristen Wiig, Maya Rudolph and Rebel Wilson had multiple scenes set in Milwaukee, though it was filmed in California.
- The 2016 documentary film MILWAUKEE 53206, directed by Keith McQuirter, examines the impact of mass incarceration by following the lives of families in Milwaukee's 53206 ZIP code, which at the time of production had one of the highest incarceration rates for African-American men in the United States. The film received national attention for its portrayal of the toll that incarceration takes on communities and had its national broadcast premiere on WORLD Channel's America ReFramed series.
- The 2025 novel Shadow Ticket by Thomas Pynchon is set in Milwaukee, following private investigator Hicks McTaggart, whose firm assigns him to find an heiress of a large Wisconsin cheese fortune.

== Sister cities ==
Milwaukee's sister cities are:

- Abuja, Nigeria
- Bomet, Kenya
- (Republic of Ireland) Galway, Ireland
- Irpin, Ukraine
- Kragujevac, Serbia
- Tarime District, Tanzania
- Zadar, Croatia
- (United States) Fresno, California
- (United States) Chester, Pennsylvania

One additional city—Chasse-sur-Rhône, France—is a friendship city. As of 2026, the sister cities of Daegu, South Korea; Medan, Indonesia; and uMhlathuze and Durban South Africa have transitioned to emeritus status. One additional sister city (Carora, Venezuela) is no longer mentioned on Milwaukee's website.

== See also ==
- 1947 Wisconsin earthquake
- Great Lakes megalopolis
- Flag of Milwaukee, Wisconsin
- Seal of Milwaukee, Wisconsin
- National Register of Historic Places listings in Milwaukee, Wisconsin
- USS Milwaukee, 5 ships
