= RiverSculpture! =

Public art displays along the river in Milwaukee, Wisconsin

RiverSculpture! are public art displays found along the Milwaukee Riverwalk in downtown Milwaukee, Wisconsin. Information kiosks stationed near each presentation offer self-guided walking tours of this annual outdoor exhibition.

== Description ==
Each year, new sculpture pieces are unveiled at the opening of RiverSplash!, a three-day summer festival held annually along the Milwaukee River, until the festival's cancellation prior to the 2010 festival. The 2009 exhibition featured 15 unique contemporary sculptures from various artists, which are positioned at locations between Wisconsin Avenue and Cherry Street.

1. Limitation Series: Bowls by Paul Sebben, 1993
2. Epiphanic Recurve Redux by Bilhenry Walker, 1995
3. Laureate by Seymour Lipton, 1969
4. Acqua Grylli by Beth Sahagian, 2001
5. Pere Jacques Marquette restored by Tom Queoff, 1987
6. Trigon by Allen Ditson, 1970
7. Victoria by Jim Agard, 2001
8. Round Ring by John Ready, 2009
9. Dream with the Fishes for Aurora by Cork Marcheschi, 1998
10. Gertie the Duck by Gwendolyn Gillen, 1997
11. Octagonal Ring by John Ready, 2009
12. Dancing Through Life by Schomer Lichtner, 2003
13. Gertie Gets Her Ducks in a Row by Benjamin Rothschild, 2007
14. You Rise Above The World by Richard Taylor, 1999
15. The Manpower Sculpture Collection

== History ==
In 1998, seven sculptors from Wisconsin were selected by a committee of educators, artists, business people and architects, to lend artworks for installation along the Milwaukee River. The first installment included: Stephen Feren's OK Ready for Zora, Narendra Patel's Cuculidae, Bilhenry Walker's Epiphanic Recurve Redux, John Richardson's Dura-Membrane, Claire Lieberman's Riversponge, Thomas Uebelherr's Bath Tub Madonna, and Peter Flanary's Island. An initial 30,000 brochures were printed to describe each piece and give locations to the various sculptures, which also included permanent sculptures by Seymour Lipton, Allen Ditson and Gwendolyn Gillen. The sculptures are intended to be on loan for one year, but the artists or owners of the artworks have allowed for longer displays, and a few are owned by the Milwaukee Riverwalk District which organizes the exhibit.

Since its first presentation, RiverSculpture! has displayed works by more than 75 sculptors, and includes 12 permanent sculptures. John Ready's River Gems Urban Jewelry Collection which was created from items of daily life was the featured installation of 2009. The entire multi-piece sculpture exhibit will be on display through October 2010.
