= Jan Serr =

American visual artist

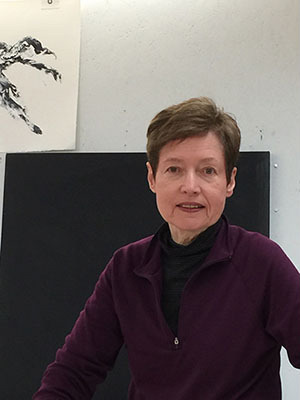
- Serr in 2015
- Born: Janice Joy Serr; 1943 (age 82–83); Dayton, Ohio
- Education: Carroll University; University of Wisconsin–Milwaukee
- Known for: Oil painting, Monotype, Photography
- Movement: Expressionism, Figurative art
- Website: http://janserr.com

Jan Serr (born 1943) is an American multidisciplinary artist, writer, and art collector based in Milwaukee, Wisconsin. Over the course of her career, she has produced oil paintings, drawings, photographs, and prints, including monotypes, lithographs, and etchings.

== Early life and education ==
Jan Serr was born in Dayton, Ohio, and grew up in Phoenix, Arizona, and Milwaukee, Wisconsin. Between the ages of eight and twenty, she primarily trained in classical music, particularly in voice and piano, with additional work in music theory and French horn.

Serr studied at the Wisconsin Conservatory of Music during the 1950s and later enrolled at Carroll University as a music major. She decided to explore other areas of study and transferred to the University of Wisconsin–Milwaukee (UWM) where she studied with Schomer Lichtner, John Colt, Lawrence Rathsack and Fred Berman. Early influences include the West Coast Figurative painters such as Richard Diebenkorn, Nathan Oliveira, and Wayne Thiebaud, as well as mid-century European artists, most importantly Max Beckmann, Oskar Kokoschka, and Emil Nolde.

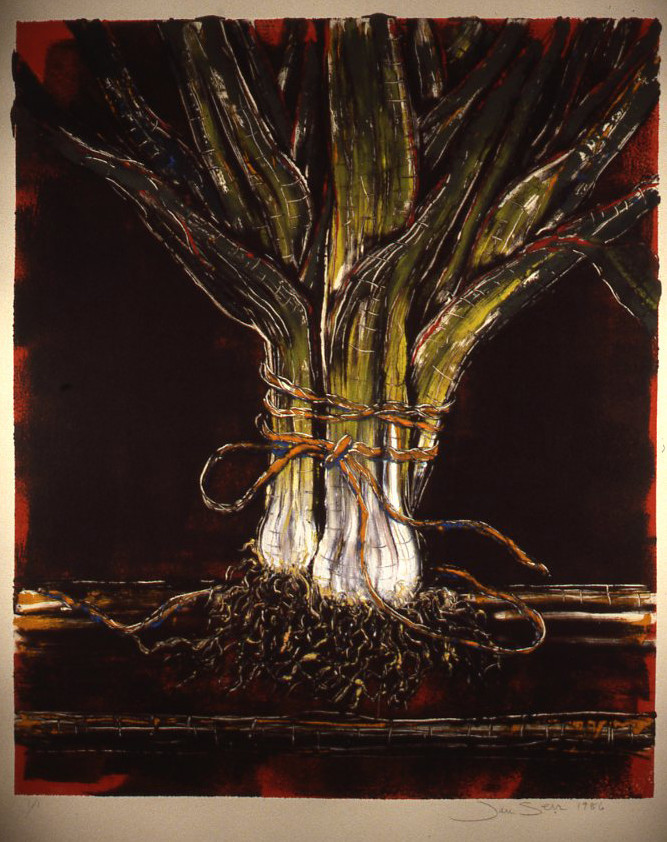
Still Life with Leeks #57, 1986, monotype, ink on paper, 23.75 x 9.5 in.

Serr received her Bachelor of Arts degree from UWM in 1964 and went on to complete her studies in the university’s MFA program. She held her thesis exhibition in 1968 and was awarded her master's degree that year. In 1969, Serr taught painting, drawing, and design at the University of Wisconsin-Stevens Point and in 1970 moved to Acton, Ontario, where she taught painting and drawing at Sheridan College Institute of Technology and Advanced Learning in Oakville, Ontario. In 2014, she taught a course on monotype printing at Penland School of Crafts in Spruce Pine, North Carolina.

== Career ==
In 1972 Serr moved to Toronto, Ontario, and began exhibiting with Marlborough Godard Gallery in Toronto, Montreal, and Calgary. In 1976 her first solo exhibition was held in the Montreal gallery.

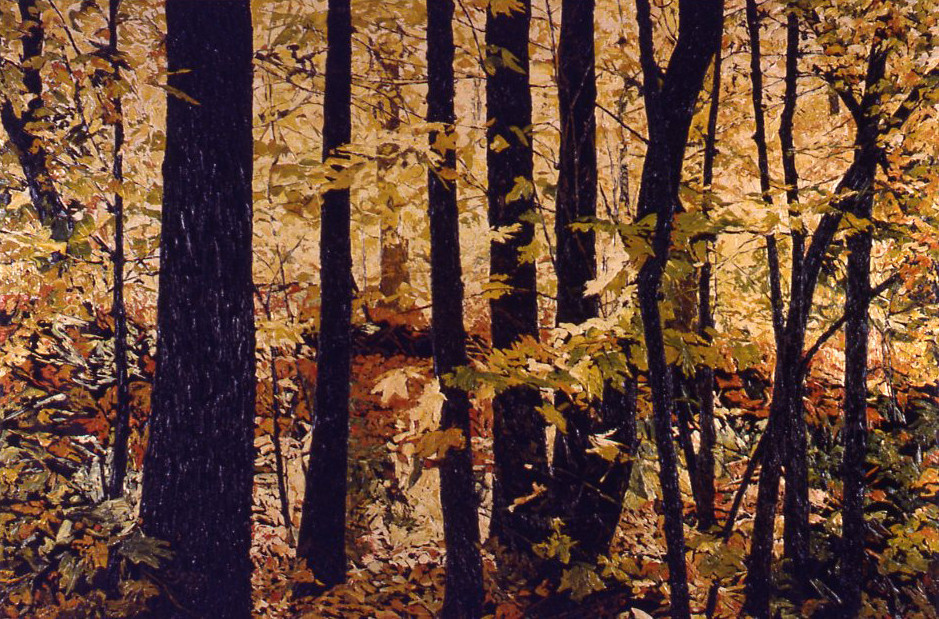
Near the Stream, 1996, oil on linen, 20 x 28 in.

Internationally, Serr has participated three times in the U.S. Department of State Art in Embassies program.

In 2010 Serr was awarded the Distinguished Alumnus Award in the Field of Art and Design by the University of Wisconsin-Milwaukee Alumni Association.

In 2016, the University of Wisconsin-Milwaukee, Peck School of the Arts, named a new sixth floor multipurpose space the Jan Serr Studio. Construction began 2017, with a Grand Opening September 28, 2019, which featured the world premiere of Kamran Ince's "A Grand American Celebration" performed by the UW-Milwaukee Peck School of the Arts Wind Ensemble, under the direction of Dr. John Climer.

== Themes ==
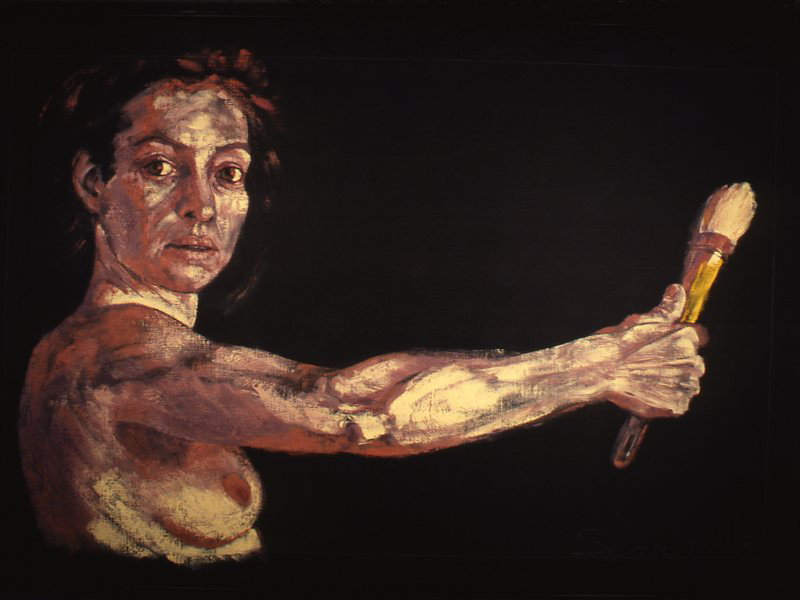
Self-Portrait with Paintbrush, 1990. Oil on linen, 32 x 48 in.

Landscapes are significant in Serr’s oeuvre, as illustrated by her Long Point Bay series, held in collections such as the Art Gallery of Ontario. Another landscape group of works, Sky Over Land, was exhibited in solo shows at Marlborough Godard Gallery in Calgary, and the Racine Art Museum in Racine, Wisconsin.

Works from the series Trees in Water, Driftless, Downstream, and Leaves and Branches were shown as part of the U.S. Department of State Art in Embassies Program.

A solo exhibition, Jan Serr: Twenty-Year Retrospective: Landscape & Figurative Paintings, was held at the Rahr West Art Museum in Manitowoc, Wisconsin, in 1985.

Representational figures and self-portraits are a substantial part of Serr’s work, explored through painting, drawing, and print mediums. About Face was a solo, forty-year survey of self-portraits and figurative work shown at the University of Wisconsin-Milwaukee Peck School of the Arts in 2011. Summer Dances, exhibited by the Museum of Wisconsin Art in 2014, is a recent series representing dancers in motion.

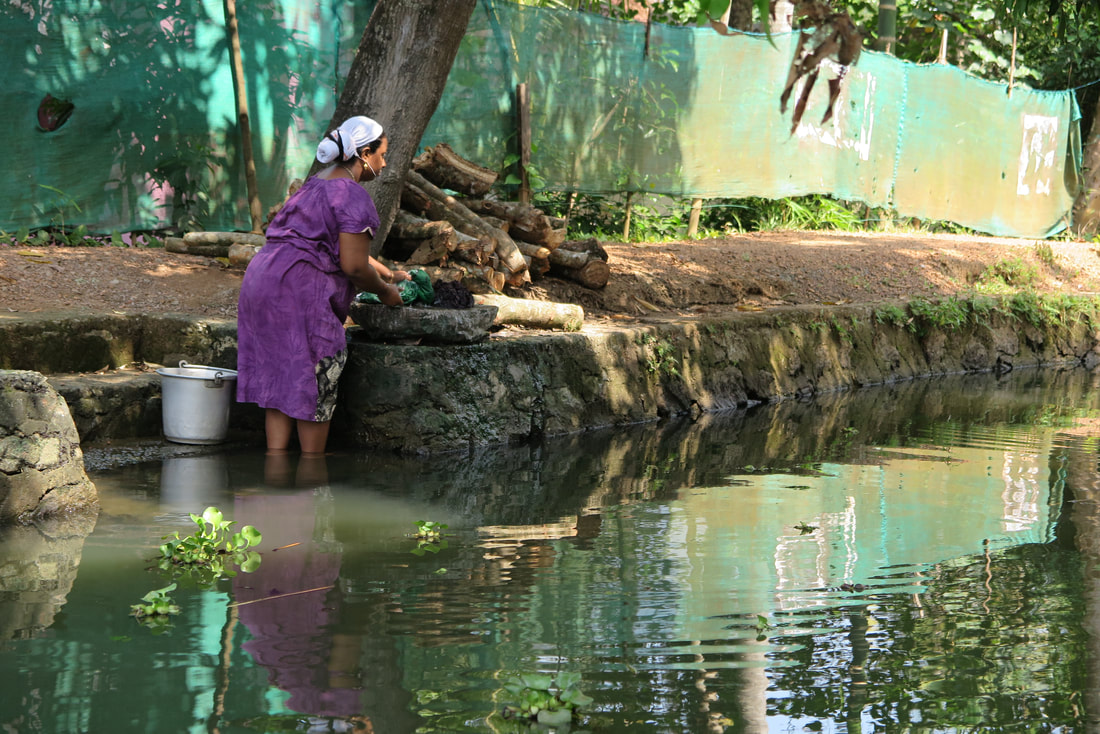
"Woman in Stream" (2016)

Two books of photographs, Then & Now: China and Smoke & Mirrors: India were published January 2017, in which Serr explained: "I was going to be working in the manner of a group of photographers that I greatly admire: Saul Leiter, Helen Levitt, and Garry Winogrand. . . I would not be the studio photographer, but I would be the candid, spontaneous, quick, prolific street photographer." The books also address Serr's relationship, and sometimes tension, between her a photography and painting practice.

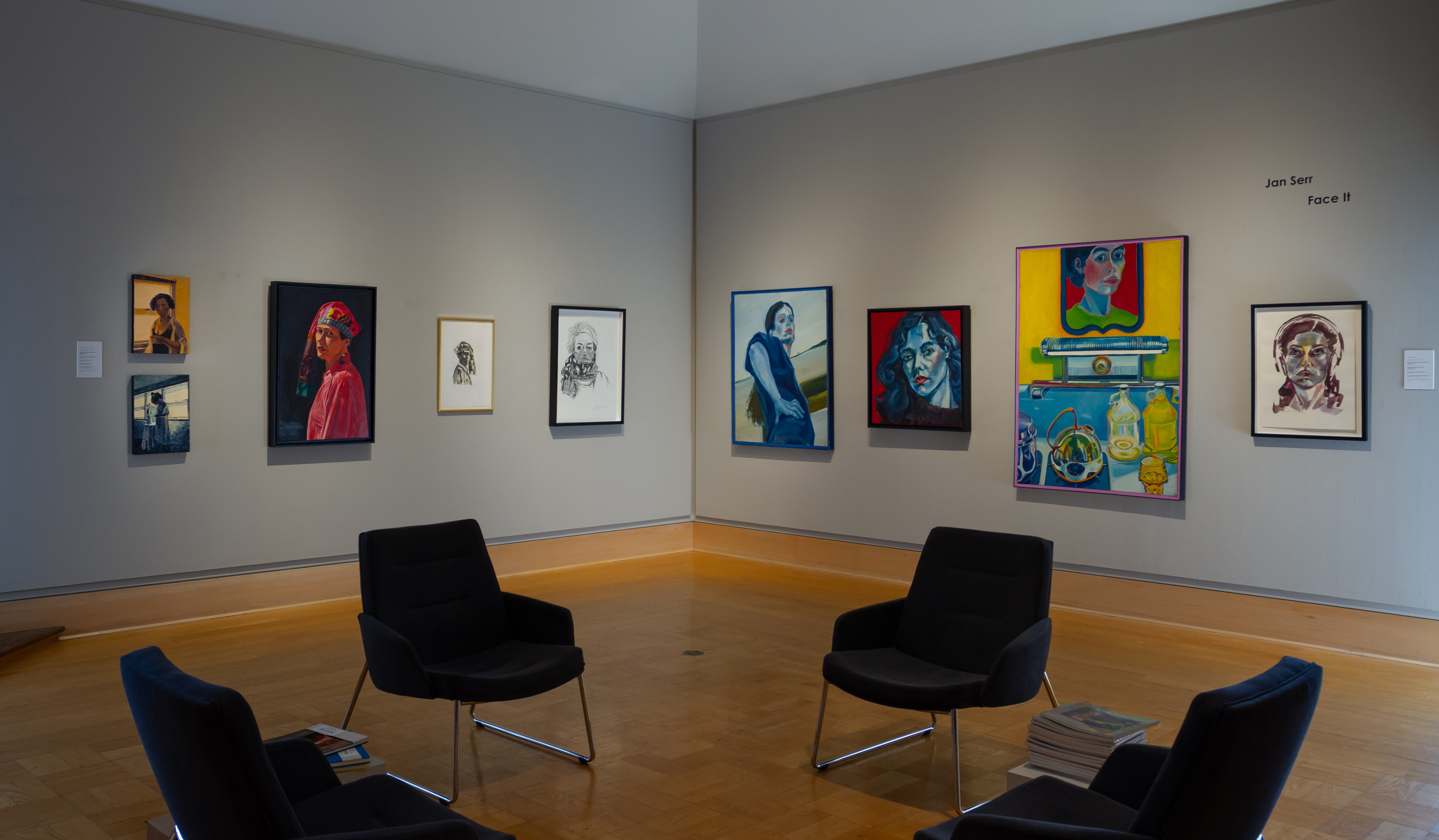
Gallery view of "Jan Serr: Face It", 2024

The Warehouse Art Museum, founded in Milwaukee by Serr and her husband John Shannon, presented the first public exhibition of her photographs in 2019, accompanied by the catalogue The Elephant's Eye.

In March 2024, the Wriston Art Galleries at Lawrence University opened "Jan Serr: Face It," an exhibition of self-portraits spanning the length of Serr's career. The exhibit included paintings, drawings, and prints in a variety of techniques all loaned from the permanent collection of the Warehouse Art Museum.

== Museum collections ==
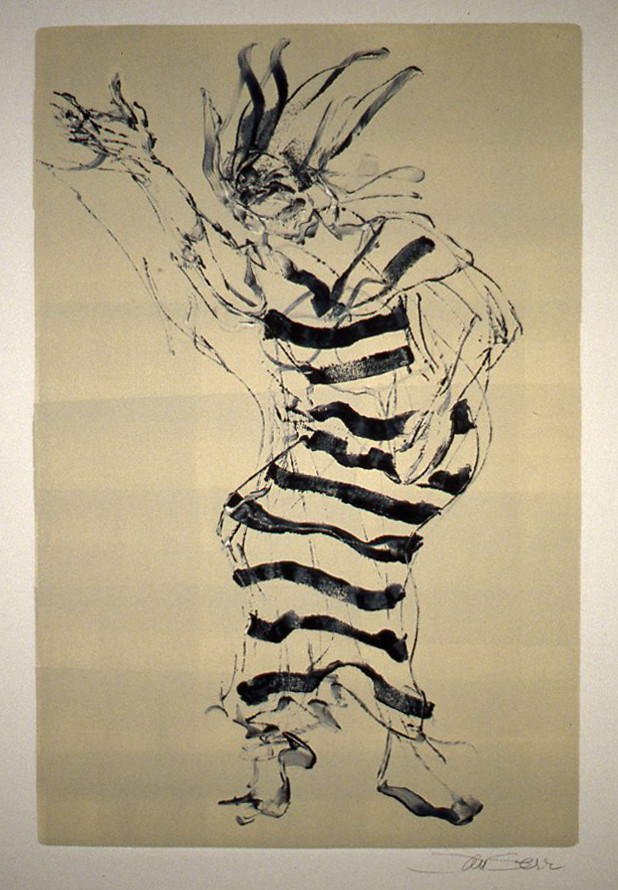
Dance #184, 2003, monotype, ink on paper, 19.75 x 13 in.

Art by Serr is represented in many public collections, including the Milwaukee Art Museum, University of Wisconsin–Milwaukee, Haggerty Museum of Art, Racine Art Museum, Paine Art Center and Gardens, Rahr West Art Museum, Warehouse Art Museum, Art Gallery of Ontario, University of Toronto and Mount Allison University.

Opened in 2018, the Milwaukee-based Warehouse Art Museum displayed a number of works by Serr alongside a collection of 7,300 modern and contemporary paintings, works on paper, photographs, and pieces of sculpture collected by the artist and her husband. Among artists represented by significant groups of works are Leonard Baskin, Ruth Grotenrath, Schomer Lichtner, Kōgyo Tsukioka, David Hockney, José Luis Cuevas, Käthe Kollwitz, Tom Shannon, Betty Woodman, and William Kentridge. The museum definitely closed to the public in 2023.

== Bibliography ==
=== Books by Serr ===
- Sky Over Land: A Monograph on Sixteen Monotypes. Racine, WI: Charles A. Wustum Museum of Fine Arts. 1982.
- Jan Serr, Twenty-Year Retrospective: Landscape & Figurative Paintings, Works on Paper, and Graphics. Racine, WI: Caledonia Press. 1985. ISBN 978-0932282217.
- Smoke and Mirrors: India Photographs. Milwaukee: Plumb Press. 2016. ISBN 978-0932282170.
- Then & Now: China Photographs. Milwaukee: Plumb Press. 2016. ISBN 978-0932282019.
- The Elephant's Eye. Milwaukee: Plumb Press. 2019. ISBN 978-0932282217.
- Rediscovering Ruth Grotenrath: All Things Belong to This Earth. Milwaukee: Plumb Press. 2023. ISBN 978-0932282224.

=== Books about Serr ===
- Seidel, Miriam (2011). About Face: Jan Serr. Milwaukee: University of Wisconsin-Milwaukee. ISBN 978-0932282101.
