= Ruth Grotenrath =

American painter and printmaker (1912–1988)

- Born: March 17, 1912; Milwaukee, Wisconsin
- Died: January 25, 1988 (aged 75); Milwaukee, Wisconsin
- Education: Layton School of Art
- Known for: Painting, Printmaking
- Movement: Social Realism, Regionalism, Abstraction
- Spouse: Schomer Lichtner

Ruth Grotenrath (March 17, 1912 – January 25, 1988) was an American painter, printmaker, and art teacher, in Milwaukee, Wisconsin. She was active for over 50 years.

== Biography ==
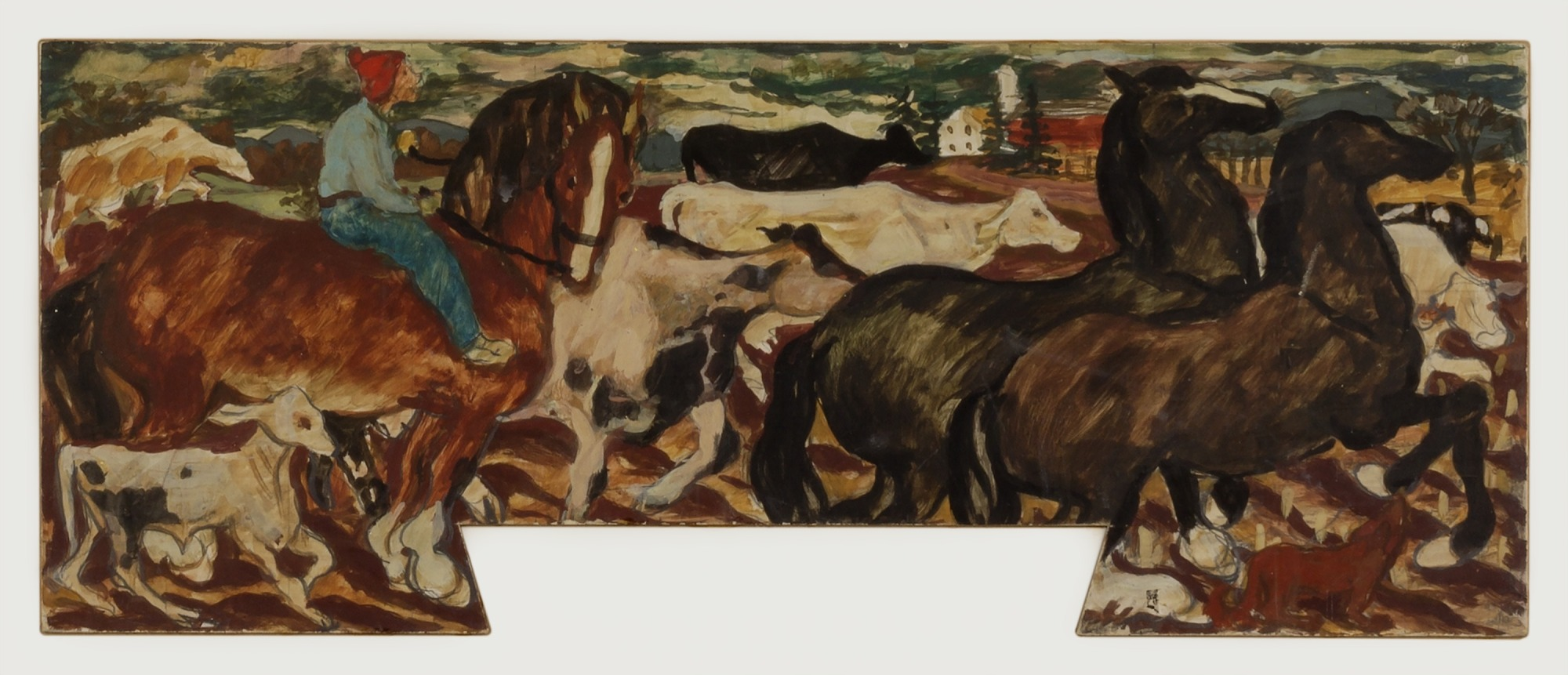
Horse and Rider—Cows, c. 1934-38, now in the collection of the Smithsonian American Art Museum

Grotenrath was born in Milwaukee in 1912, where she attended Riverside High School. She received her Bachelor of Arts from the Milwaukee State Teachers College, studying with Gustave Moeller, Robert von Neumann, and Elsa Ulbricht. In 1934, she married fellow painter Schomer Lichtner, and the couple began employment with the Works Project Administration. In the wake of the Second World War, Grotenrath taught painting at the Layton School of Art. In 1945, she and Lichtner held an important retrospective exhibition of their works at the Wisconsin Historical Museum in Madison. Later on, Grotenrath turned to printmaking and design, which she taught at the University of Wisconsin–Milwaukee in the 1960s.

Grotenrath's early works were influenced by American Regionalism yet, by 1940, she had started experimenting with brighter colors and abstraction. Later in life, she became interested in Japanese art, traveling to the country in 1965, and she focused her attention to painting still lifes. She died in Milwaukee in 1988 from complications to heart surgery.

== See also ==
- Dancing Through Life, a sculpture by Grotenrath's husband Schomer Lichtner, installed on Milwaukee's Riverwalk in 2003.

== Bibliography ==
- Montgomery, Susan J. (2011). In Celebration: The Life and Art of Ruth Grotenrath. West Bend, WI: Museum of Wisconsin Art.
- Montgomery, Susan J. (2011). In the Moment: The Life and Art of Schomer Lichtner. West Bend, WI: Museum of Wisconsin Art.
- Sawkins, Annemarie; Serr, Jan; Shannon, John (2023). Rediscovering Ruth Grotenrath: All Things Belong to This Earth. Milwaukee, WI: Plumb Press.
