= Dancing Through Life =

Dancing Through Life may refer to:

- Dancing Through Life (song), a song from the musical Wicked
- Dancing Through Life (sculpture), a public art work by Schomer Lichtner
