= Fred Berman =

American abstract artist (1926–2011)

- Fred Berman, c. 1966 by The Milwaukee Journal
- Born: Fred Jean Berman; November 3, 1926; Milwaukee, Wisconsin
- Died: November 6, 2011 (aged 85); Milwaukee, Wisconsin
- Known for: Painting, assemblage, collage, photography, printmaking
- Notable work: The Storm, White City #2
- Movement: Abstract, Representational, Contemporary art
- Spouse: Joy Gross (1949-1966)
- Awards: Joseph N. Eisendrath Prize (1950); Wisconsin Visual Art Lifetime Achievement Award (2010)

Fred Berman, born Fred Jean Berman (November 3, 1926 – November 6, 2011), was a Jewish American abstract artist.

== Early life ==
Fred Berman was born in Milwaukee, Wisconsin, in 1926 to father Ezra Berman and mother Frances, children of Russian Jews who immigrated to the American Midwest. He was the youngest of four children. Due to a possible heart condition in his youth, he was told to avoid physical exertion and focused his energies on chess and art. Berman was an adept chess player, winning the junior Milwaukee city-wide championship four consecutive years. In the summer of 1943, he went to work for the architecture firm Eschweiler & Eschweiler, and this experience laid the foundation for his future artistic ventures in architecture.

After earning a bachelor's degree from the Milwaukee State Teachers College and a master's degree from the University of Wisconsin-Madison, Berman joined the faculty at the Layton School of Art in 1949, later considered one of the premier art schools in the United States.

== Career ==
Berman achieved early success in his career, receiving the Joseph N. Eisendrath prize from the Art Institute of Chicago in 1950 for his encaustic painting titled The Storm. In 1955, after establishing himself as an art instructor and regional talent, Berman attempted to get his work recognized by a larger audience. He was familiar with Katharine Kuh through past exhibition juries and knew she was curating a collection of American artists to showcase at the next Venice Biennale. After writing her a request to show his art, he loaded up his father's car with his paintings and drove to the Art Institute of Chicago. They met at the loading docks of the museum to review his work. According to Berman, Kuh stated, "Double congratulations for being so young and painting so well."

Kuh selected White City #2 from Berman's White City series paintings for the American Pavilion exhibition at the Biennale, titled American Artists Paint the City. It was, as Tom Lidtke (Retired Executive Director of MOWA) wrote, "a luminous and intentionally ambiguous urban scene that was as much atmospheric as it was architectural." At 29, Berman was the youngest artist featured in the exhibition alongside the likes of Mark Rothko, Jackson Pollock and Willem de Kooning.

Berman joined the art department staff at the University of Wisconsin-Milwaukee in 1960. A shift in his art was recognized during this period from gritty and dark urban themes to softer, natural landscapes. Though he continued to paint for the remainder of his life, Berman grew more skilled in other mediums, as well. In 1965, one of his wooden assemblages was displayed at The Box Show at the Byron Gallery in New York. This exhibition was notable for featuring assemblages by Louise Nevelson, Joseph Cornell, and Robert Rauschenberg among others. Berman exchanged lectureships with Hugh Finney at the University of Reading in England during the 1966–67 academic year.

Berman's works were exhibited in a number of acclaimed art galleries throughout his lifetime, including the Royal Academy of Arts, Whitney Museum of American Art and the Art Institute of Chicago. He earned the title professor emeritus from the University of Wisconsin-Milwaukee for his decades-long contribution to teaching and taught there until 1993. Among his most notable students, Berman claims Leon Travanti, Richard Cramer, Nancy Greenebaum and Will Bruder. In 2010, he was honored with the Wisconsin Visual Art Lifetime Achievement Award from the Museum of Wisconsin Art.

== Style ==
Berman's art shifts between abstract and representational, often merging the two to varying degrees, forming intentionally ambiguous pieces. Dean Sobel, former chief curator at the Milwaukee Art Museum, noted that even in Berman's most abstract pieces approaching non-objectivity or Abstract Expressionism, he always relies on a subject for inspiration.

White City #2, oil painting, 1955

In his early paintings, collages and prints, Berman demonstrated a fascination with linear geometry. He explored form, texture, structure and volume, often with architectural themes and incorporating Cubist elements. Collage with King of Spades (1951), Facade No. 2 (1955) and the White City series (1953–57) demonstrate this approach. By the early 1960s, he traded this angular vision for a softer, more expanded revelation of light and color in his more freely painted landscapes. Examples of these include the Falling Sun series (1959–61), Winter Landscape series (1961–63) and Rain Shadows series (1963).

Great Primer, wooden assemblage, 1964

For a brief period in the mid-1960's, Berman produced wooden assemblages. Donald Key, art editor for the Milwaukee Journal, called them "haunting." Berman explained, "People think this assemblage work is a sudden departure from my painting, but actually 15 years ago I was doing façade-like canvases that combined letters, numbers, parts of old posters and objects that were similar to the new compositions with actual objects... I always have had an affinity for things of the past, their textures, shapes and moods. My work with actual printers' materials began from an assignment I gave my art classes to collect old type faces." Like Great Primer (1964), shown at the San Francisco Museum of Art, his creations are often dominated by highly organized wood type characters with the inclusion of printed materials, photo images and other objects designed to conjure nostalgia and mystery.

An exchange lectureship gave him the opportunity to explore Europe more deeply and by the end of the decade he was influenced by J. M. W. Turner and his rendering of light by combining layers of color. Berman utilized this technique in his works focusing on greenhouse interiors that were inspired by his time in Reading. He returned to elements of interior architecture in the following decades, including references to his personal studio where the artist's presence is only alluded to through his tools, such as in Studio Still Life (1985).

Photography was another important medium for Berman's art. He originally picked up a camera in 1958 because a broken finger in a cast temporarily stopped him from painting. But it wasn't until 1975 that he began to regularly exhibit his photographs. By his own account, he was not a photographer but rather an artist who used a camera. His style was unconventional for the time given that he didn't develop his own film, resented artificial light, shot spontaneously with a hand-held camera and worked exclusively in color. Rather than paint from his photos, he would often photograph subjects he had painted in the past. Sobel characterized Berman's photographs as "cool and distant," adding to his formalist approach.

== Inspirations ==
Berman had strong ties to the burgeoning abstract art scene in Wisconsin in the mid-20th century. As a student at the Milwaukee State Teachers College, he received praise from German-born regionalist artist Robert von Neumann and was influenced by Carl Holty's modernist paintings. He exhibited with contemporaries Arthur Thrall and Joseph Friebert, the latter of which was a major inspiration to some of Berman's most recognized works in architectural abstraction. J. M. W. Turner, Pierre Bonnard, Édouard Manet and the Cubist movement have been cited as inspirations for his art as well.

== Notable exhibitions ==
=== Solo ===
- Paintings and Prints by Fred Berman, 1964; Milwaukee Art Center
- Fred Berman: Paintings and Photographs, 1982; Kresge Art Center
- Photographs by Fred Berman, 1983; Camden Art Centre, London
- Fred Berman: Assemblages and Photographs, 1988; Patrick and Beatrice Haggerty Museum of Art
- Fred Berman, 1990; Charles Allis Art Museum
- Fred Berman Retrospective 1949-1994, 1994; University of Wisconsin-Milwaukee
- Fred Berman Photographs / Walls and Windows, 2001; Villa Terrace Decorative Arts Museum
- Fred Berman: Works Across Seven Decades, 2009; University of Wisconsin-Milwaukee

=== Group ===
- 54th Annual Exhibition by Artists of Chicago and Vicinity, 1950; Art Institute of Chicago
- 146th Annual Painting and Sculpture Exhibition, 1951; Pennsylvania Academy of the Fine Arts
- American Water Colors, Drawings, and Prints, 1952–1953; The Metropolitan Museum of Art
- The 23rd Biennial Exhibition, 1953; Corcoran Gallery of Art
- 2nd National Exhibition of Prints, 1953; University of Southern California
- The 11th National Exhibition of Prints, 1953; Library of Congress
- 1st Annual Dallas National Print Exhibition, 1953; Dallas Museum of Fine Arts
- The 12th National Exhibition of Prints, 1954; Library of Congress
- The 24th Biennial Exhibition, 1955; Corcoran Gallery of Art
- 28th Venice Biennale, 1956; Venice
- Paintings: Joseph Friebert and Fred Berman, 1956; Milwaukee Art Institute
- The 26th Biennial Exhibition, 1959; Corcoran Gallery of Art
- Annual Exhibition of Contemporary American Painting, 1959–1960; Whitney Museum of American Art
- Young America 1960: Thirty American Painters Under Thirty-Six, 1960–1961; Whitney Museum of American Art, The Baltimore Museum of Art, Contemporary Arts Center, City Art Museum of St. Louis, Columbus Gallery of Fine Arts
- 75 Printmakers from North America, 1960; Museo de Bellas Artes de Caracas
- 65th Annual Exhibition by Artists of Chicago and Vicinity, 1962; Art Institute of Chicago
- 68th Western Annual, 1962; Denver Art Museum
- 6th Biennial of Painting and Sculpture, 1962; Walker Art Center
- The Box Show, 1965; Byron Gallery
- 84th Annual Exhibition, 1965; San Francisco Museum of Art
- The 199th Royal Academy of Arts Summer Exhibition, 1967; Royal Academy of Arts
- The Art Collection of the First National Bank of Chicago, 1974; The First National Bank of Chicago
- These Images Exist: Photography by Fred Berman and Diana Peters, 1976; Palo Alto Art Center
- Contemporary Art - Thursday, November 13th, 1980; Christie's - New York
- Some Photographic Uses of Color, 1984; David Winton Bell Gallery
- 100 years of Wisconsin Art, 1988; Milwaukee Art Museum
- The Jewish Contribution in Twentieth-Century Art, 1993; Milwaukee Art Museum
- Wisconsin Artists: A Celebration of Jewish Presence, 1994; Patrick and Beatrice Haggerty Museum of Art
- Joseph Friebert, Fred Berman & the Milwaukee Scene 1935-1965, 2007; Corbett vs. Dempsey
- Wisconsin Moderns, 2010; Dean Jensen Gallery
- Wisconsin Masters: An Artistic Legacy, 1900-1970, 2012; UWM Art History Gallery'
- Founders & Visionaries: Wisconsin Jewish Artists from the Milwaukee Art Museum, 2015; Jewish Museum Milwaukee
- Wisconsin Modernists: Rebels from Regionalism, 2018; Cedarburg Art Museum

== Notable Collections ==
- Brown University
- Chazen Museum of Art
- Eli and Edythe Broad Art Museum
- Milwaukee Art Museum
- Museum of Wisconsin Art
- Nelson-Atkins Museum of Art
- Patrick and Beatrice Haggerty Museum of Art
- Rhode Island School of Design Museum
- University of Wisconsin–Green Bay
- University of Wisconsin–Milwaukee
