= John Vickery =

John Vickery may refer to:

- John Vickery (actor) (born 1950), American actor
- John Vickery (artist) (1906–1983), Australian artist
- John Vickery (footballer) (born 1951), Australian rules footballer
