= River Rhythms (Wisconsin) =

Annual music concert in Milwaukee, Wisconsin

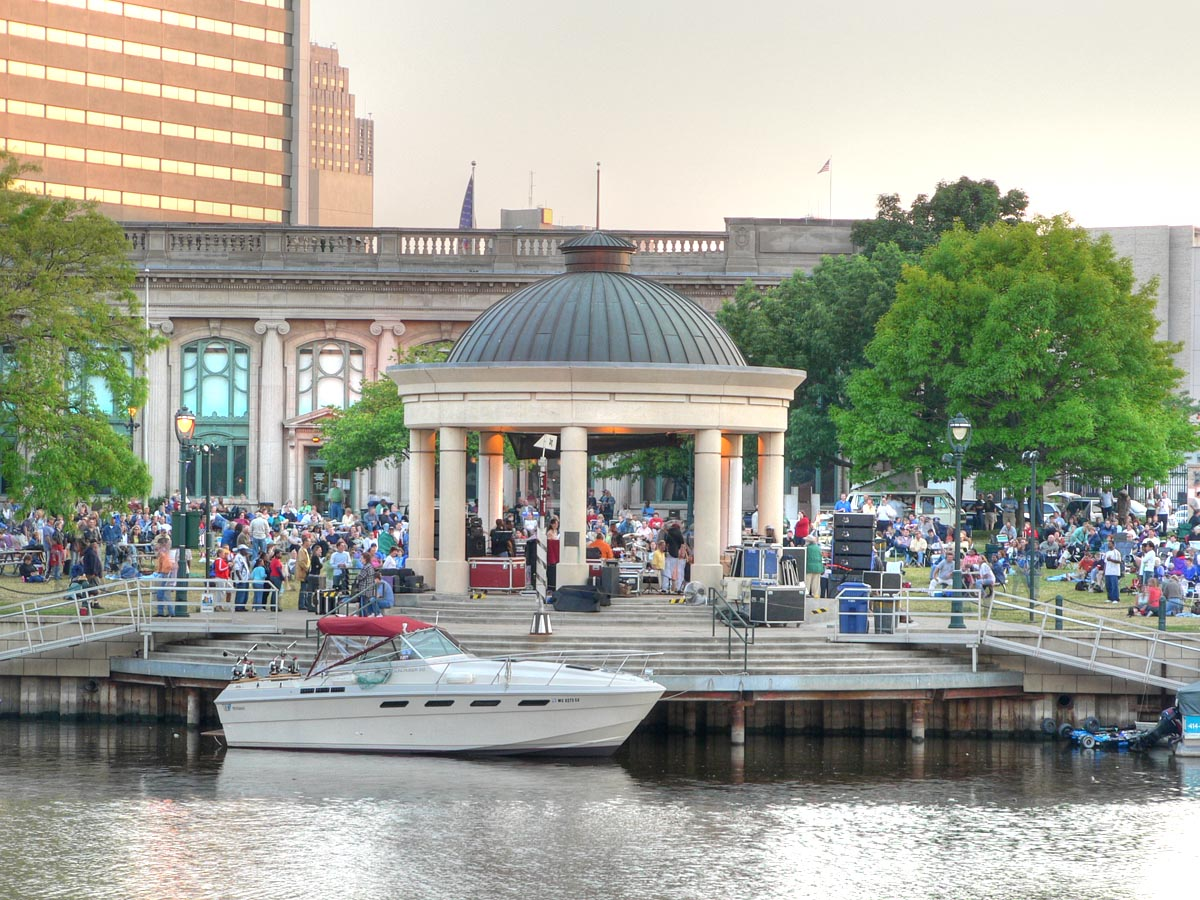
Pere Marquette Park

River Rhythms is a free outdoor music concert series held annually at Pere Marquette Park along the Milwaukee River in downtown Milwaukee, Wisconsin. It takes place Wednesday evenings from June through September and showcases a wide variety of music entertainment.

The event, along with Summerfest and the many ethnic and cultural festivals held throughout the city, are what give Milwaukee the nickname "City of Festivals."

== Description ==
River Rhythms was created in 1996 by the Westown Association to draw attention to the historic Old World Third neighborhood and the Milwaukee Riverwalk. Since then, it has been billed as "downtown's fastest growing music festival". Many people bring picnics and blankets to enjoy while bands play. River Rhythms celebrated its 10th anniversary in 2006.

With 2020 being scrapped due to the COVID-19 pandemic, the 25th anniversary celebration awaits in 2021.

== See also ==
- RiverSplash!
