= Hoan Bridge =

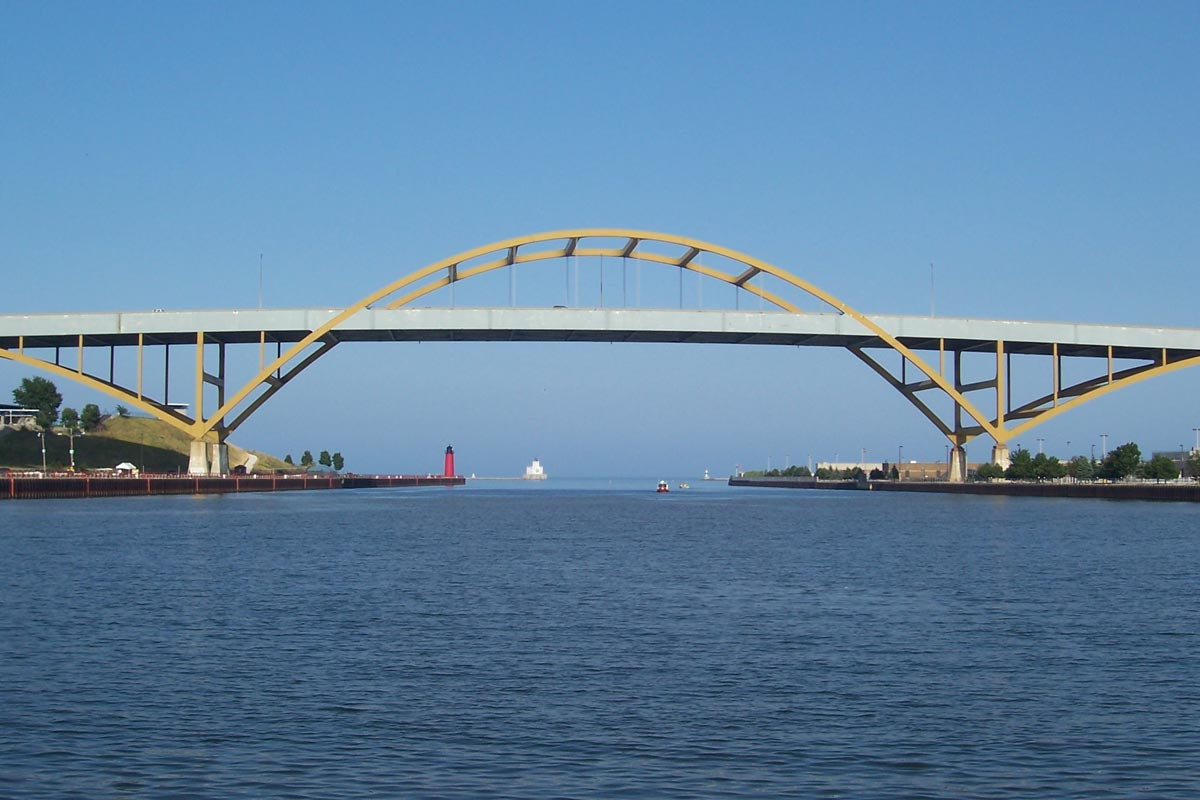
- The Hoan Bridge
- Coordinates: 43°01′30″N 87°53′56″W
- Carries: 6 lanes of I-794
- Crosses: Milwaukee River
- Locale: Milwaukee, Wisconsin, U.S.
- Official name: Daniel Hoan Memorial Bridge
- Maintained by: Wisconsin Department of Transportation (WisDOT)

Characteristics
- Design: Tied arch bridge
- Total length: 3,057.8 m (1.9 mi)
- Width: 15.8 m (51.8 ft)
- Longest span: 185 m (607.0 ft)
- Clearance below: 36.6 m (120.1 ft)

History
- Construction start: 1970
- Opened: 1977
- Rebuilt: 2000-2001

Statistics
- Daily traffic: 19230

The Daniel Hoan Memorial Bridge is a tied-arch bridge that connects Interstate 794 in downtown Milwaukee, Wisconsin, to the Lake Freeway across the Milwaukee River inlet. Originally called the Harbor Bridge, it was renamed after Daniel Hoan (Socialist Party), one of the longest serving mayors of Milwaukee.

== History ==
The Hoan Bridge was designed by the firm Howard, Needles, Tammen & Bergendoff and in 1975 won the American Institute of Steel Construction (AISC) Long Span Bridge Award. Construction of the bridge occurred briefly from 1970 until 1972, but it did not open to traffic until 1977 due to the freeway revolts of the era against the planned Milwaukee County freeway system. The revolt halted completion of the connecting roadways, leading to the bridge being famously dubbed "The Bridge to Nowhere."

It was widely believed that the unfinished bridge was the location of a car chase scene in the movie The Blues Brothers. However, author Matthew J. Prigge clarified in a two part series for the Shepherd Express that filming happened two years after the bridge opened in 1977, and the scene was actually shot on a different incomplete section of I-794.

Bridge connections were eventually in 1998 with the Lake Parkway (Wisconsin Highway 794) which linked the bridge's southern exit to connect the Bay View neighborhood with downtown Milwaukee.

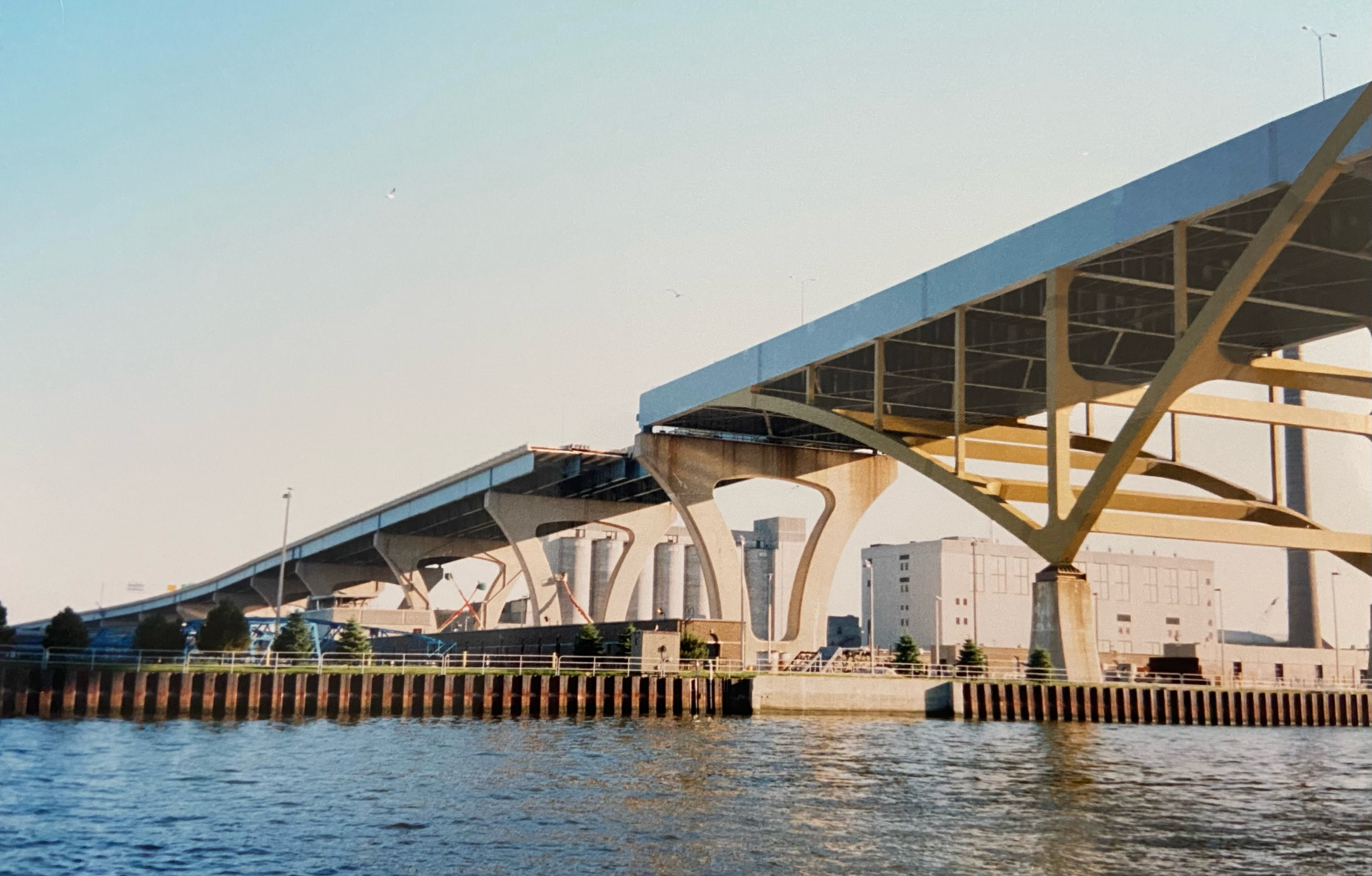
Hoan Bridge in August, 2001

On December 13, 2000, the Hoan Bridge was temporarily closed after two of the three support beams on the lakefront span failed, causing the northbound lanes to buckle and sag by four feet. No injuries occurred. Damaged sections were removed by controlled explosion on December 28, 2000. During repair southbound lanes were restricted to one lane per direction for eight months, with two lanes per direction restored by October 10, 2001, and full reopening shortly after. The failure was attributed to improperly designed welds combined with extreme winter weather. The repair and retrofit cost approximately $16 million. According to the Milwaukee Journal Sentinel, at the time of its failure, the six lanes of the bridge had carried an average of only 36,590 cars per day.

A comprehensive rehabilitation project was nearly completed by September 2016, replacing the bridge deck, making structural adjustments, and repainting steel to extend the bridge's lifespan by 40 to 50 years, coinciding with related I-794 construction.

In May 2018, a private campaign, "Light the Hoan bridge" was started to install lighting on the bridge at a project cost of $4 to $5 million. Despite fundraising delays, the bridge was lit for the first time on October 22, 2020, with nightly displays of various colors and sequences. The campaign relaunched fundraising efforts in 2023 with a goal to light the east side of the bridge by the 2024 Republican National Convention, with support from the convention's host committee.

== Gallery ==
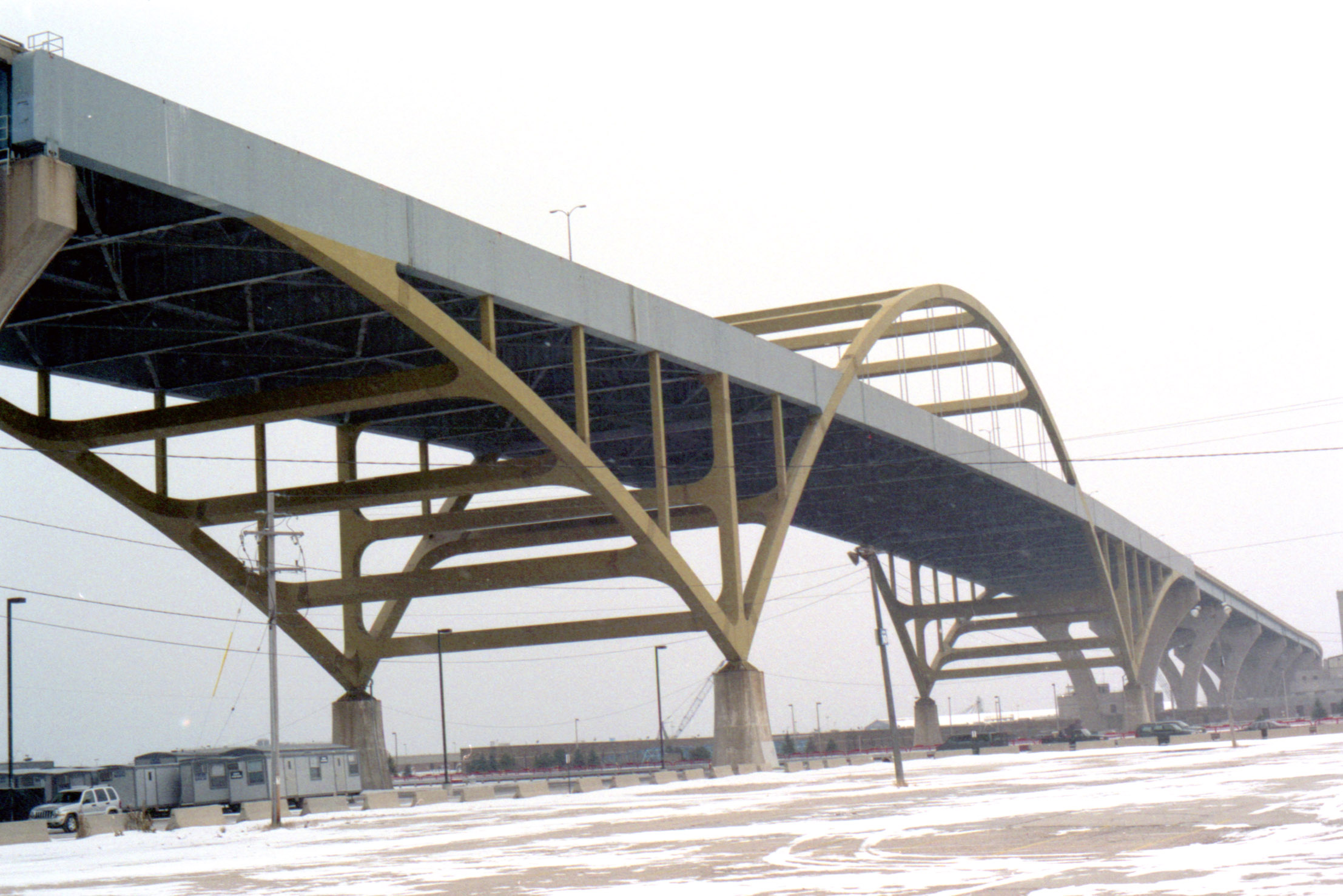
The underside of the bridge

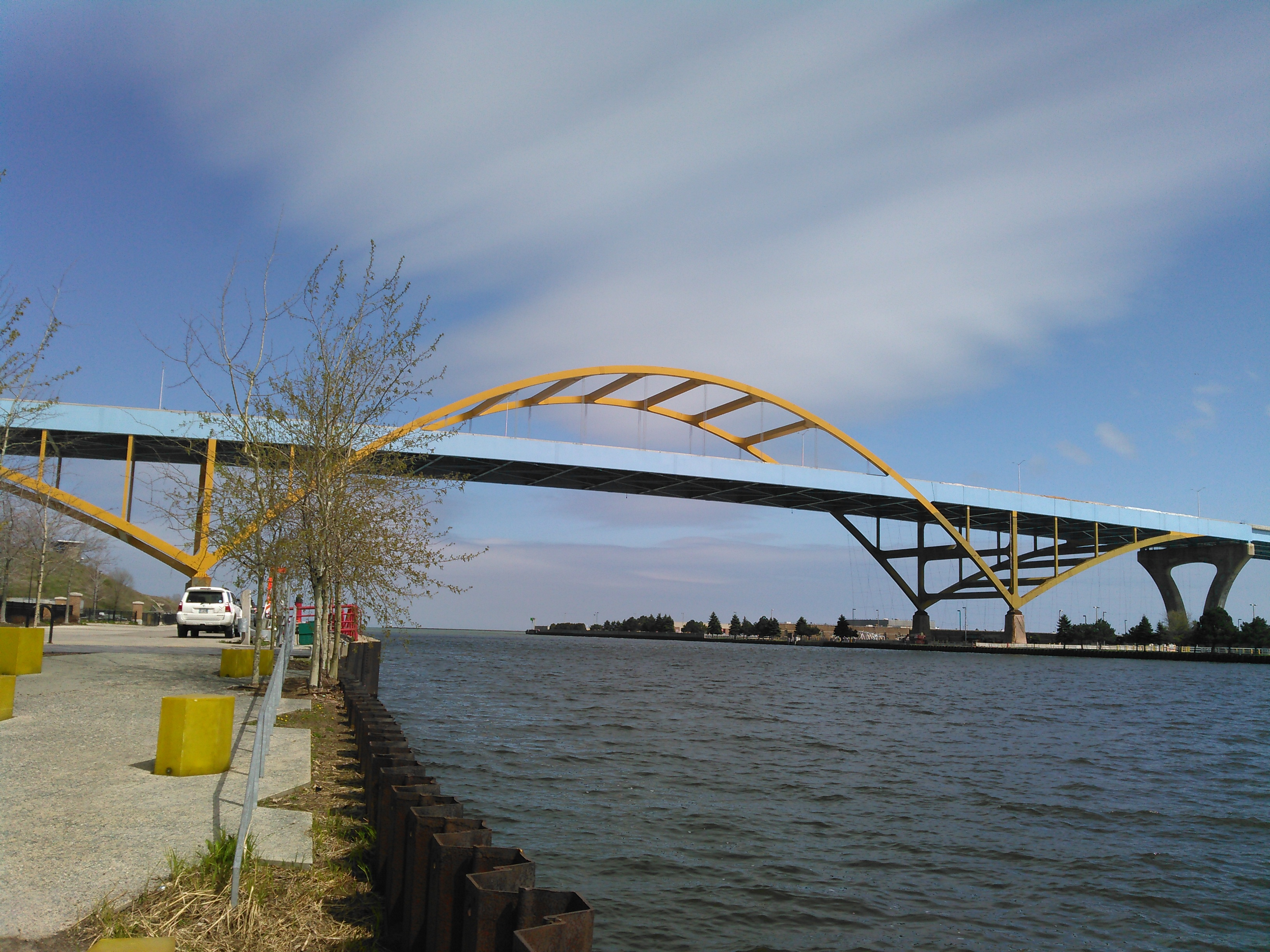
Bridge in 2016 after restoration project. Viewed from Erie Street Plaza.

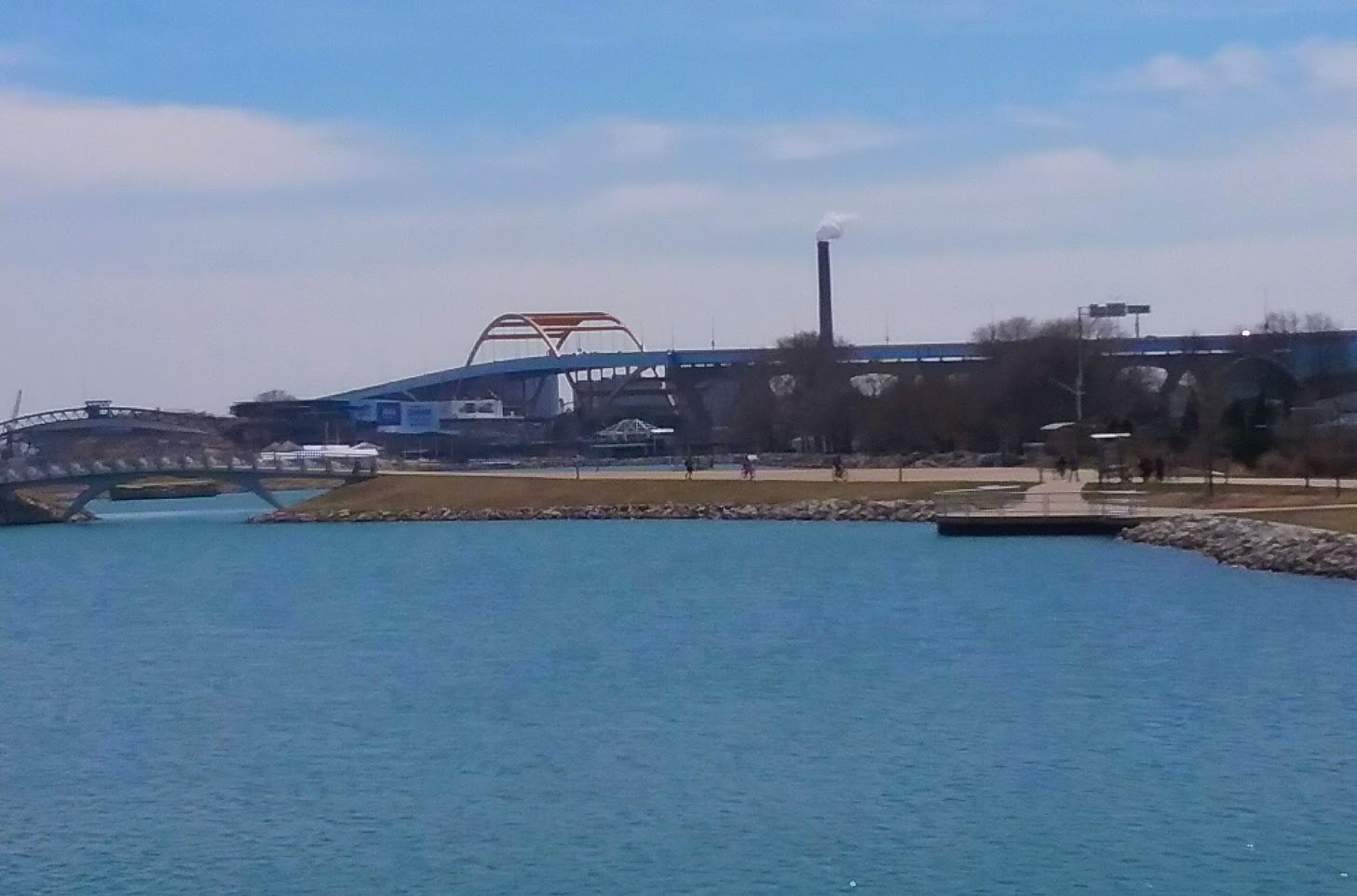
The Hoan Bridge viewed from Discovery World

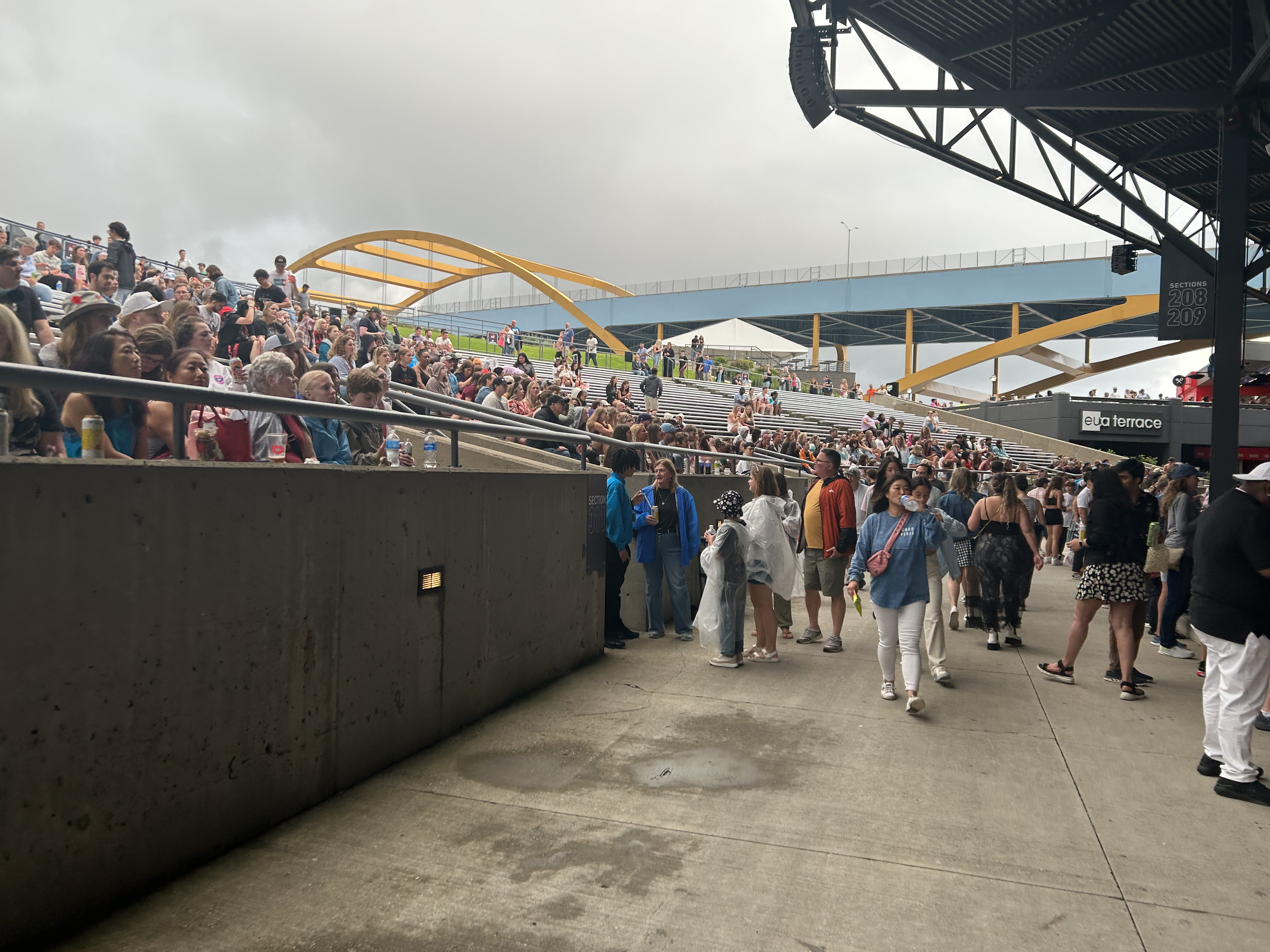
Bridge, viewed from the adjacent American Family Insurance Amphitheater

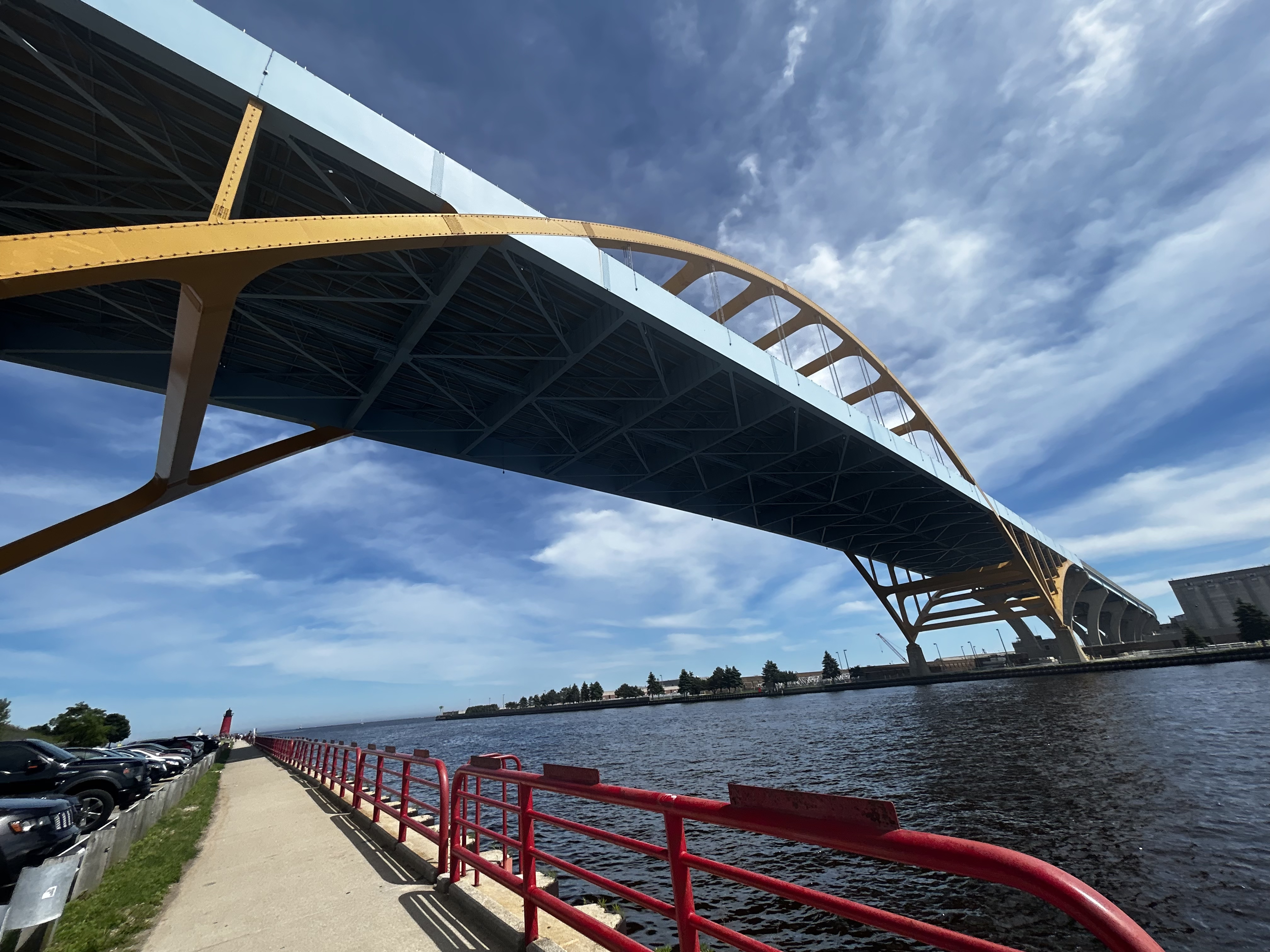
View of the bridge from below
