= Acqua Grylli =

Artwork by Beth Sahagian

- Artist: Beth Sahagian
- Year: 2001
- Type: bronze
- Location: Milwaukee, Wisconsin; 43°02′27.2″N 87°54′44.1″W
- Owner: Milwaukee Riverwalk

Acqua Grylli is a public art work by American artist Beth Sahagian, located on the Riverwalk in downtown Milwaukee, Wisconsin. The artwork is a bronze arch depicting a mythical female figure. It is located on the west side of the Milwaukee River between Wells Street and Kilbourn Avenue.

The work was commissioned by the Riverwalk business improvement district and dedicated in August 2001. The figure is imagined as a guardian or gatekeeper.

Sahagian is a Milwaukee artist and proprietor of Vanguard Sculpture Services.
