= Wisconsin Highway 794 =

Highway in Wisconsin

State Trunk Highway 794
- John R. Plewa Memorial Lake Parkway
- WIS 794 highlighted in red

Route information
- Maintained by WisDOT
- Length: 4.76 mi (7.66 km)

Major junctions
- South end: CTH-ZZ at Cudahy–Oak Creek–South Milwaukee border
- North end: I-794 in Milwaukee

Location
- Country: United States
- State: Wisconsin
- Counties: Milwaukee

Highway system
- Wisconsin State Trunk Highway System; Interstate; US; State; Scenic; Rustic
← I-794	→ I-894

State Trunk Highway 794 (Highway 794, STH-794, WIS 794), officially the John R. Plewa Memorial Lake Parkway or simply the Lake Parkway, is a 4.76-mile (7.66 km) state highway in Milwaukee County, Wisconsin, United States, that goes north–south from downtown Milwaukee to its southern suburbs.

== Route description ==
Starting at College Avenue (County Trunk Highway ZZ, CTH-ZZ), WIS 794 begins to travel north via Pennsylvania Avenue. This stretch of road is just east of Milwaukee Mitchell International Airport. At Edgerton Avenue, WIS 794 briefly turns west but then curves north. At that point, it travels on a limited-access road (Lake Parkway) next to a railroad. It then meets Layton Avenue at a partial diamond interchange and then Howard Avenue (unsigned WIS 794 Spur) at a diamond interchange. After crossing under a railroad underpass, it meets Oklahoma Avenue. This time, a one-quadrant interchange appears at that point. This involves a signalized intersection in the middle of a quasi-freeway. Continuing onwards, it then crosses over WIS 32 without an interchange and then meets Carferry Drive. At this point, WIS 794 becomes I-794. This is one of three pairs of routes that have the same numbering but different designation (the others being I-41/US 41 and I-39/WIS 39).

== History ==
The Lake Parkway was originally planned to be a lakeside freeway, named the Lake Freeway, extending from just north of downtown Milwaukee all the way south to the Illinois state line, connecting with the Amstutz Expressway and possibly following all the way to Lake Shore Drive. Due to protests over construction, the Lake Freeway was never completed, and the Amstutz Expressway in Illinois was similarly never completed. Before the Lake Freeway project was cancelled, a portion of the route was built immediately south of downtown Milwaukee. The Hoan Bridge, a bridge spanning the mouth of the Milwaukee River connecting downtown and Bay View, was constructed. However, the bridge stood unused for three years subsequent to its completion, unconnected to any other road, and locally it was known as the "Bridge to Nowhere". The unfinished bridge was used as the site of a car chase scene in the movie The Blues Brothers. In 1977, the freeway was connected to the East–West Freeway and Carferry Drive, causing traffic from the Lake Freeway to exit onto surface streets.

In the 1990s, construction on what would become the Lake Parkway began along the Union Pacific/former Chicago and North Western Transportation Company right-of-way. The whole project took approximately eight years. The Lake Parkway opened in October 1999.

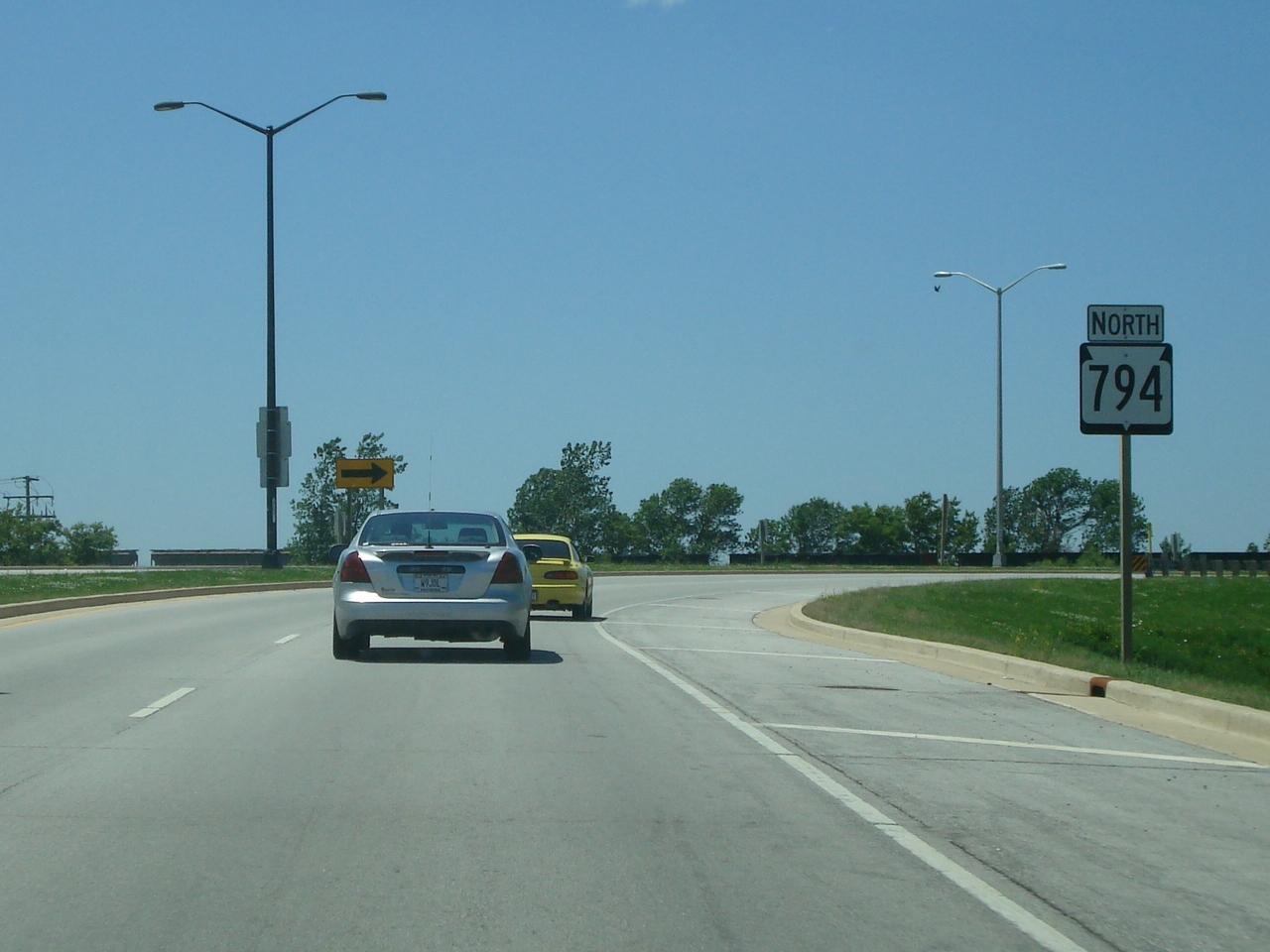
WIS 794 north marker, located just after the start of Lake Parkway at the intersection of Pennsylvania and Edgerton Avenues in Cudahy

The freeway section of WIS 794—the John R. Plewa Memorial Lake Parkway, as it is formally known—was completed to the corner of East Edgerton Avenue and South Pennsylvania Avenue, after six years of terminating at the Layton Avenue off-ramp. The parkway has four exits. The Oklahoma Avenue exit, however, requires a traffic light for southbound vehicles to enter and exit.

A newly constructed 1/2-mile (800 m) section of Howard Avenue between WIS 794 and WIS 32 is part of the state trunk highway system and officially labelled a spur of WIS 794. This spur is the only unsigned state highway in Milwaukee County.

WIS 794 continues down South Pennsylvania Avenue, running just east of Milwaukee Mitchell International Airport south to its terminus at College Avenue at the Cudahy–South Milwaukee border.

== Major intersections ==
The entire route is in Milwaukee County. All exits are unnumbered.

Location	mi	km	Destinations	Notes
St. Francis	0.0	0.0	Layton Avenue	Southbound exit and northbound entrance only
St. Francis	1.0	1.6	Howard Avenue	
Milwaukee	2.0	3.2	Oklahoma Avenue	Traffic light controlled at-grade intersection
Milwaukee	3.0	4.8	Carferry Drive	Northern terminus; roadway continues as I-794
1.000 mi = 1.609 km; 1.000 km = 0.621 mi: Incomplete access

== Spur route ==
Spur WIS 794 is a spur route connecting WIS 32 to WIS 794. It is one of only three spur routes in Wisconsin, and it is unsigned.
