= Pere Jacques Marquette (Queoff) =

Artwork by Aldo Pera

Coordinates: 43°02′30.5″N 87°54′49.5″W

- Artist: Tom Queoff
- Year: 1987
- Type: bronze
- Dimensions: 180 cm × 81 cm × 81 cm (69 in × 32 in × 32 in)
- Location: Milwaukee, Wisconsin
- Owner: Milwaukee County Parks Department

Pere Jacques Marquette is a public art work by American artist Tom Queoff, located in downtown Milwaukee, Wisconsin. The bronze figure depicts the Jesuit missionary standing with cross in hand. It is located in Pere Marquette Park near the Milwaukee County Historical Society and Riverwalk.
