= Gwen Gillen =

American sculptor and artist

Gillen's 2002 sculpture of Moore replicates the hat-tossing final scene from the opening credits of The Mary Tyler Moore Show.

Gwendolyn "Gwen" Gillen (January 6, 1941 – January 27, 2017) was an American sculptor and artist. Her best known works include a bronze sculpture of actress Mary Tyler Moore tossing her Tam o' shanter hat into the air as a homage to the final scene of opening credits of The Mary Tyler Moore Show. Gillen's life-size sculpture of Moore, dedicated in 2002 on the Nicollet Mall in downtown Minneapolis, is one of the city's most recognizable landmarks and a "symbol of Minneapolis". Her other well known pieces include a 4-foot bronze sculpture of Gertie the Duck, which was installed on the Wisconsin Avenue bridge in Milwaukee in 1997.

== Biography ==
=== Early and personal life ===
Gillen was born Gwendolyn Scrivener on January 6, 1941. Her father, Carl H. Scrivener, was a newspaper editor for The Patriot Ledger. She was raised in Quincy, Massachusetts. Gillen studied acting at the American Academy of Dramatic Arts in New York City, which helped her lose her Massachusetts accent. She met her future husband, Ronald W. Gillen, who was from Brooklyn at an evening party in New York City. The couple married in a ceremony held on May 20, 1961, in Spokane, Washington. Ronald Gillen was a member of the U.S. Air Force, causing the couple to move frequently, including to Guam and Japan.

By the late 1960s, the Gillens had settled in the Milwaukee metropolitan area so Ronald Gillen could enroll at the Milwaukee School of Engineering. They settled in nearby Hustisford, Wisconsin, where they raised two children, Alessandra and Christopher. Gwen Gillen worked as a set designer for a local Wisconsin theater.

=== Career ===
Gwen Gillen began her career as a sculptor by creating small, test sculptures in the basement studio of her home in Hustisford, Wisconsin.

In 2001, Gillen, by then an accomplished sculptor, was commissioned to create and cast a statue of Mary Tyler Moore's iconic cap tossing scene from the opening of The Mary Tyler Moore Show, which was set in a fictional television station in Minneapolis. Gillen was chosen from a group of 21 sculptors who had submitted designs for Moore's statue. Gillen was elated to be chosen to create Moore's likeness in bronze, telling the Milwaukee Journal Sentinel in 2001, "It's so enjoyable, really, to be portraying a woman...Sculptors are very seldom called upon to depict a woman of prominence. This is all very refreshing." However, the logistics of creating the Moore's trademark hat throw proved to be a challenge for Gillen to replicate. Gillen had to re-create the cap tossing to figure out how best to depict the hat, noting, "I actually practiced throwing the hat to find out when it left the hand...It comes out between 75 and 80 degrees on the slant. So I’m showing it at just between 78 and 80 degrees, with the hat just touching the fingers of her extended right hand, and the thumb open...I'm not trying to do anything tricky or silly — suspending wires or attaching it to a building or pole. I thought this would be a good way to achieve the effect."

Gillen's statue was dedicated at the Nicollet Mall, a pedestrian walkway in downtown Minneapolis, in 2002 with Moore in attendance. According to Gillen's daughter, the Mary Tyler Moore statue remained her favorite piece from her portfolio. The statue on display at the Minneapolis Visitor Center, as of February 2017, pending completion of renovations on the Nicollet Mall.

Though best known for her Mary Tyler Moore bronze, public art by Gillen can be found on display throughout the world. Another of her known is a four-foot tall sculpture of Gertie the Duck and her ducklings, which was installed on the Wisconsin Avenue bridge in Milwaukee in 1997.

Gillen also created several life-size sculptures of Father Joseph Kentenich, founder of the Roman Catholic Schoenstatt Movement, which outside Schoenstatt chapels in Puerto Rico, Rome and Pewaukee, Wisconsin.

Other examples of Gillen's work include war memorials. Gillen designed the Wisconsin Korean War Veterans Memorial in Plover, Wisconsin, which includes five figures, including nurses and infantrymen from the U.S. Army and the United States Marines. However, she deliberately decided not to depict any of the figures carrying weapons in the memorial.

In 2005, Gillen was commissioned to create a memorial bust of Michelle Witmer, a member of the Wisconsin National Guard killed in the Iraq War, which now stands at the Wisconsin Department of Military Affairs in Madison, Wisconsin. Witmer was the first woman to be killed in combat in the history of the National Guard and the first member of the Wisconsin National Guard to die in combat since World War II. Gillen originally intended to depict a serious face on Witmer's sculpture, as usually shown on a fallen soldier, until she met Witmer's family, who said she was typically smiling. In a 2005 interview with NPR, Gillen explained her decision to redesign Witmer's memorial, "You figure there's so many military sculptures out there, and they all have the sort of same feeling to them as far as being honorable, country, duty, serious,” she said. “I mean, it’s not a light subject, but you don’t see many of them smiling. And it's not made up something – it's not something – 'Well, I want to put a smile on her.' She constantly had a smile on her. You've got young people that are dying in this war, and young people don’t go around with these serious expressions on their face."

Another of Gillen's less serious pieces, a 16-foot medallion-shaped, ceramic tile floor mosaic depicting a Holstein cow eating a cream puff, was installed at the southwest entrance to the Wisconsin State Fair in 2000. Her mosaic, funded by the state Percent for Art program, which required that the Fair spend a certain percentage on public art, cost approximately $18,000. Gillen was an advocate for the Percent for Art program and believed it should be expanded. By 2014, millions of visitors, as well harsh Wisconsin winters, had caused the mosaic to crack and crumble, necessitating makeshift concrete patches. Restoration work was needed to restore Gillen's bovine-cream puff tile mosaic, though she was suffering from deteriorating health at the time and could not make the repairs herself.

An enthusiastic anglophile, Gwen Gillen was a frequent guest of Anthony Hopkins and his former wife, Jenni, at their home in London. She created a bronze bust of Hopkins, which is now on display at a London theatre.

=== Later life ===
Gillen resided at the Madison Heights Senior Community in Madison, Wisconsin, from 2013 until her death in January 2017. She died from complications of dementia at the Madison Heights Senior Community hospice unit on January 27, 2017, at the age of 76. She was survived by her older sister, Carol Chapman, and her daughter, Alessandra Gillen. Gillen was predeceased by her husband, Ronald, who died in 2012, and their son, Christopher Gillen, who died in 2015.

Gillen's death occurred just two days after the death of Mary Tyler Moore, the subject of Gillen's best known sculpture, who died in Connecticut on January 25, 2017. As news of Mary Tyler Moore's death broke, more than 150 people gathered near Gillen's statue in Minneapolis and tossed their hats in the air in tribute to the actress and The Mary Tyler Moore Show.
