= Gertie the Duck =

Milwaukee mallard honored with a statue

- Artist: Gwendolyn Gillen
- Year: 1997
- Location: Milwaukee; 43°2′19″N 87°54′37″W

Gertie the Duck is an icon of Milwaukee, Wisconsin history and the subject of a 4-foot-tall (1.2 m) bronze sculpture by American artist Gwendolyn Gillen. It was installed on the Wisconsin Avenue bridge in September 1997.

The story of her heroic efforts to hatch six ducklings became an inspiration for many war-weary Americans near the end of World War II. Gertie's story unfolded as a daily serial in the local newspaper for 37 days, captivating the residents of Milwaukee, the state and eventually the country.

== History ==
Gertie's story began in April 1945 when Milwaukee Journal outdoor writer Gordon MacQuarrie reported that a mallard duck was nesting on a wood piling under the Wisconsin Avenue bridge. A total of nine eggs were laid and the duck kept vigil atop her nest despite throngs of visitors and motorists stopping on the bridge daily to check the progress of the expectant mother. Mother's Day cards began arriving for the mallard, the Boy Scouts formed a Gertie Patrol and a Wisconsin Humane Society officer was stationed to watch the brood as six of the nine eggs eventually produced chicks.

Public interest continued to swell as wire services picked up MacQuarrie's stories. Gertie and her nest were photographed by the Journal and local rival Milwaukee Sentinel, featured in Life Magazine and even had a front-page story in the United Kingdom's Daily Express. Reader's Digest ran a story on Gertie entitled "The Duck That Made Milwaukee Famous".

Despite flooding, storms and fire on some nearby pilings, five ducklings and Gertie survived the ordeal and were put on public display in the nearby Gimbels department store windows, where more than 2 million visitors peered in to see the famous feathered family. The ducks were later relocated to the Juneau Park lagoon on Milwaukee's lakefront.

== Popular culture ==
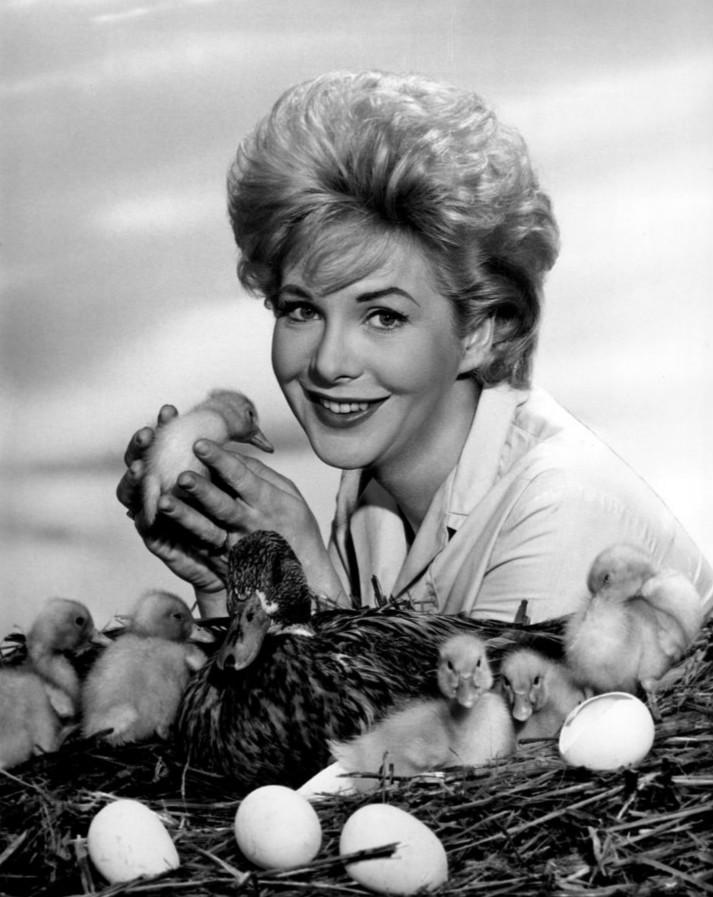
A promotional still for Gertie the Great

The first book based on Gertie's story was The Story of 'Gertie', published by the Journal in July 1945 and based on its daily coverage. The book sold out three printings before being re-printed by New York's Rinehart & Co. in 1946.

That same year, Milwaukee toymaker Earl F. Wendt produced a wooden toy duck named for the famous mallard.

In 1959, Nicholas P. Georgiady and Louis G. Romano, two Milwaukee-area teachers, wrote a children's book titled Gertie the Duck. The book was reissued in 1988 after selling more than 800,000 copies and translated into six languages.

Gertie's story was also told in an episode of GE True in 1963 entitled "Gertie the Great", featuring Jan Shepard as a reporter assigned to cover the hatching eggs.

== Sculpture ==
Gertie the Duck is a 4-foot-tall (1.2 m) bronze sculpture of the mallard duck created by sculptor Gwendolyn Gillen. The original cost of the sculpture was $15,000, and it was given to the city by the Eppstein Uhen Architects firm and installed in September 1997. It stands on the northwest side of the Wisconsin Avenue bridge over the Milwaukee River in downtown Milwaukee. The sculpture is part of the art displays called RiverSculpture!

== See also ==
- List of individual birds
