= Byron Gallery =

American art gallery

- Interactive map of Byron Gallery
- Location: Manhattan, New York, United States
- Coordinates: 40°46′45.06″N 73°57′38.14″W
- Owner: Charles Byron
- Type: Art gallery
- Events: Surrealist art Contemporary art

Construction
- Opened: 1961
- Closed: 1971

The Byron Gallery was an art gallery founded in 1961 by Charles Byron and was located on Madison Avenue, New York, New York in the United States. Byron Gallery exhibited primarily Surrealist masters, emerging contemporary painters and sculptors, and the occasional Old Masters and ancient art exhibit. The gallery closed in 1971.

The gallery represented selected artists and also sold work by other artists represented by other galleries or from the secondary market. Artists represented by Byron Gallery included: Herbert Bayer, Albert Kotin, Clement Meadmore, Richard Merkin, Brian O'Doherty, Hans Richter and John Vickery.

Byron Gallery also held group and solo shows featuring artists they represented and outsiders. American Landscapes showcased over 40 American landscape artists in 1964. The Box Show in 1965 featured over 100 artists, including Louise Nevelson, Sol LeWitt, Robert Rauschenberg, Richard Bernstein (artist), and Andy Warhol. Warhol made another appearance at the gallery the same year for The Paris Review, which also featured Jim Dine, Helen Frankenthaler, Robert Indiana, Ellsworth Kelly, among others. The gallery also featured non-contemporary exhibitions including two Pre-Columbian shows in 1967 400 Years of Italian Art: Florentine Relief Fund Art Show and Greek Gold Exhibition from 1967–1968. The gallery closed in 1971 and Charles Byron became a private dealer. In 1970 the gallery exhibited over 60 works by Max Ernst, featuring drawings, collages and sculptures from 1917 to 1967.

== Notable exhibitions ==
400 years of Italian Art was a benefit for the people and areas of Florence, Italy affected by the 1966 Flood of the River Arno. A committee was formed for the benefit and featured representatives from Italy and the United States from the United Nations, Italian Consul General of New York, the Italy-America Society, and private citizens. The exhibition was curated by Paul Magriel and was installed by Gene Moore of Tiffany & Company. The show featured a brief survey of 15th to 18th-century Italian decorative arts including ceramics, jewelry, drawings and sculptures loaned by galleries and collectors from New York including Benjamin Sonnenberg, Russell Lynes, the wife of James Rorimer, Richard Sisson and others.

== Byron Gallery records ==
In 1998 owner Charles Byron moved out of his home and donated his papers pertaining to the Byron Gallery to the Archives of American Art. Byron's papers were meticulously kept starting in 1962. He documented every exhibition with photographs of objects and the installations. These photographic documentations were then placed in albums along with details including catalogues, gallery announcements, attendee lists, checklists, advertisements and reviews, creating what the Archives describes as a mini-history for each exhibition. More than 40 albums make up the collection.
