= RiverSplash! =

Annual summer festival held in Milwaukee, Wisconsin (1989-2009)

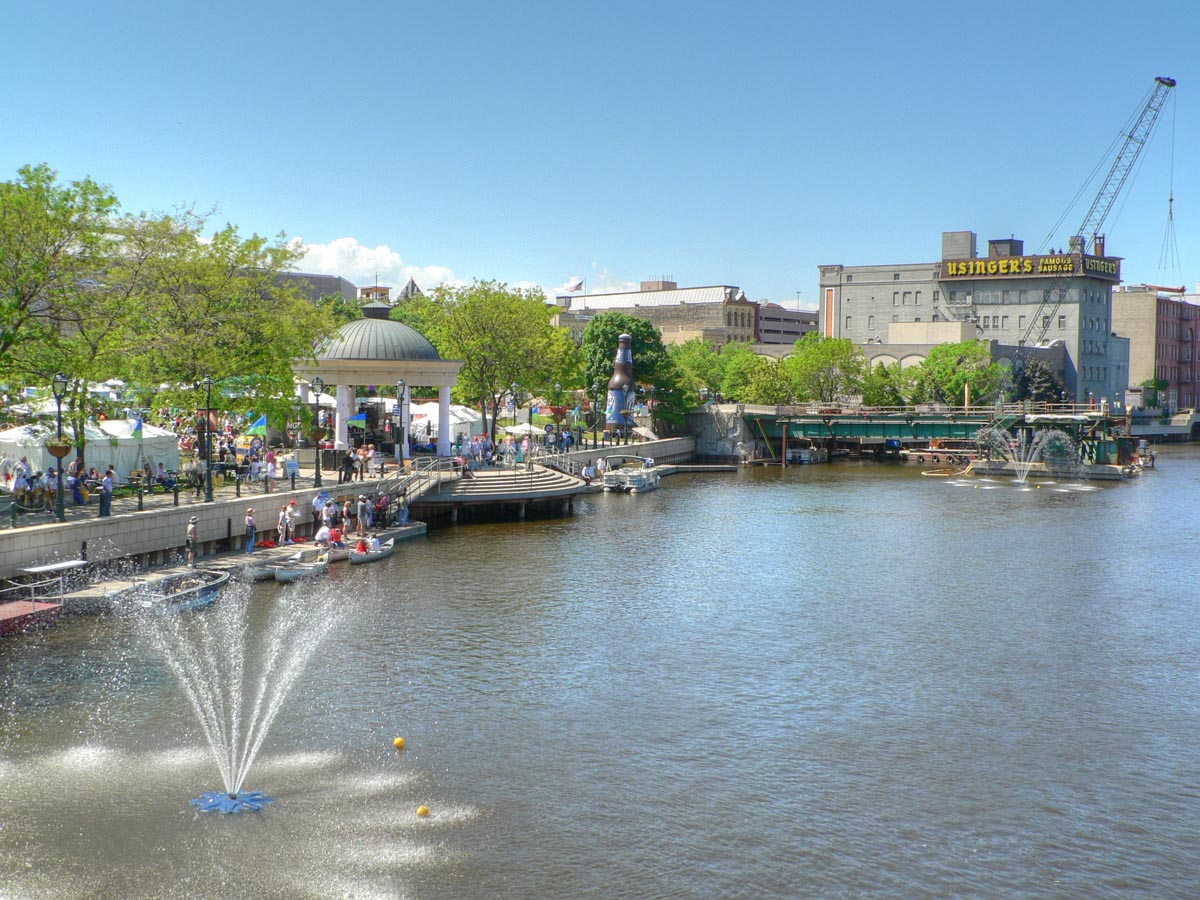
Pere Marquette Park

RiverSplash! was a free three-day summer festival held annually along the Milwaukee River in downtown Milwaukee, Wisconsin. The event drew an attendance of 150,000 to 175,000 people and was spread out over ten city blocks. It featured ten music stages and 40 bands, along with a marketplace, boat rentals, fireworks, and street performers.

The event, along with Summerfest and the many ethnic and cultural festivals held throughout the city, are what give Milwaukee the nickname "City of Festivals."

== Description ==
Festivities began with opening ceremonies and a Great Paddle-Off between politicians and civic leaders at Pere Marquette Park, a central location along the river which hosts the Miller Genuine Draft Park Stage and other key events. New pieces of public art called RiverSculpture! were also unveiled at points along the Milwaukee Riverwalk.

Over 30 food vendors and restaurants were located throughout the event area. Notable are the store fronts of the historic Old World Third Street such as Usinger's Famous Sausage, Third Street Pier and Mader's German Restaurant. Firework displays were held on Friday and Saturday nights.

== End Of RiverSplash ==
On a December 22nd, 2009 press release, board member Marsha Sehler of the Milwaukee Riverwalk District stated that the 2009 season was to be the last RiverSplash. “RiverSplash has had a successful 20-year run, but festivals are costly ventures and have their life cycles. It’s time for us to redirect our energies.”

== See also ==
- River Rhythms, Milwaukee, Wisconsin
