= Erie Street Plaza =

County park in Milwaukee, Wisconsin, United States

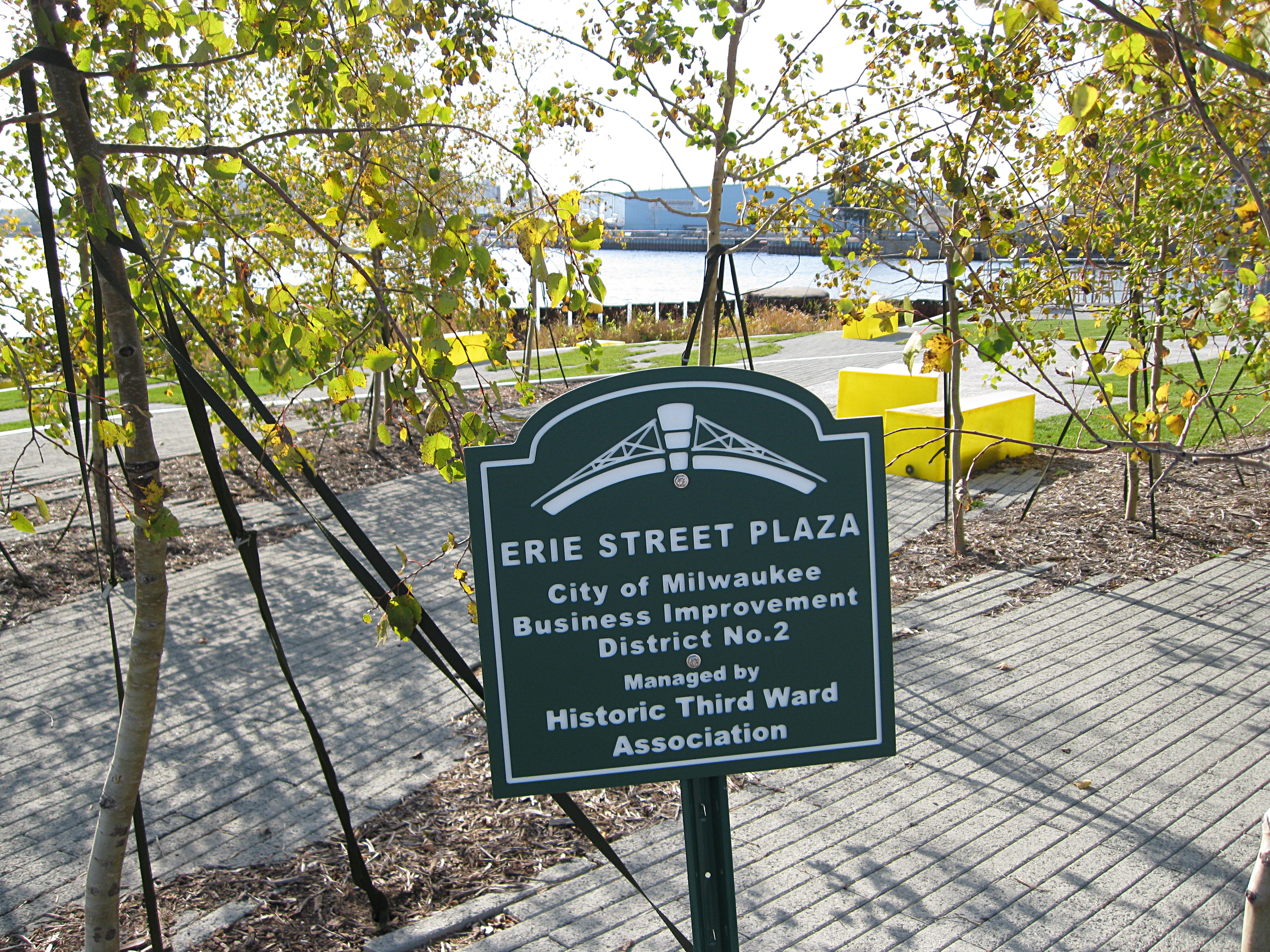
- Interactive map of Erie Street Plaza
- Location: Milwaukee, Wisconsin
- Coordinates: 43.02586°N 87.90180°W
- Area: .25 acres (0.10 ha)
- Created: 2010
- Designer: Stoss Landscape Urbanism
- Awards: Boston Society of Landscape Architecture: Merit Award in Waterfront Design (2013); Mayor's Design Award (2011)

Erie Street Plaza is a park and public space in Milwaukee, Wisconsin that opened in 2010.

== Description ==
Located in the Historic Third Ward neighborhood, the plaza is connected to the Milwaukee Riverwalk and situated at the confluence of the Milwaukee River and the Kinnickinnic River, just west of the entrance to the Milwaukee Harbor from Lake Michigan. The Hoan Bridge and Milwaukee Pierhead Light are located to the east of the plaza and are visible from it.

After a design competition, a proposal from Stoss Landscape Urbanism, a Boston firm, was selected. The plaza design features native prairie plants, yellow fiberglass benches that are illuminated at night, and several pathways with edges that blend into the vegetation. The original plans included installations of heated bamboo plants, but due to the cost and challenges of maintaining bamboo in Milwaukee's climate, quaking aspen trees were used instead. Additional aspects of the plaza's landscape architecture include the direct use of river water for plant irrigation, a reduction in surface temperature due to the vegetation, and fishing access compliant with the Americans With Disabilities Act.

The plaza was completed in 2010 with a final cost of approximately $580,000 and is currently maintained by the Historic Third Ward Association. In 2013, a steel sculpture entitled Sunrise by Richard Edelman was installed.
