= Laureate (Lipton) =

Public art display in Milwaukee, Wisconsin, US

Coordinates: 43°02′33.8″N 87°54′45.0″W

- Artist: Seymour Lipton
- Year: 1969
- Type: nickel-coated, welded sheet metal
- Dimensions: 380 cm × 170 cm (150 in × 68 in)
- Location: Milwaukee, Wisconsin
- Owner: Milwaukee Riverwalk

Laureate is a public art work by American artist Seymour Lipton, located on the Riverwalk in downtown Milwaukee, Wisconsin. The abstract artwork was commissioned by the Allen-Bradley Company in memory of Harry Lynde Bradley and as an enhancement for the newly constructed Performing Arts Center. It is located on the east bank of the Milwaukee River at 929 North Water Street.
