= Dancing Through Life (sculpture) =

Sculpture by Schomer Lichtner

- Artist: Schomer Lichtner
- Year: 2003
- Type: painted sheet steel
- Dimensions: 340 cm (132 in)
- Location: Milwaukee Riverwalk; Milwaukee, Wisconsin; 43.04175°N 87.91367°W

Dancing Through Life is a public art work by artist Schomer Lichtner. It is installed on the Riverwalk in Pere Marquette Park in downtown Milwaukee, Wisconsin.

== Description ==
The steel sculpture depicts a ballerina "poised prettily" on a cow. The cow is painted green, purple, blue and yellow, with a black face, white triangular nose and red horns. The ballerina bends one knee to rest on the back of the cow and kicks her other leg overhead. She wears a red and white polka-dotted leotard, white tutu and red ballet slippers. Both arms extend aloft, and she holds a blue fan above her head in one hand. The entire composition incorporates folds and assemblage to create a sense of angularity and dynamism.

== Location ==
Dancing Through Life occupies a prominent location at the southern entrance to Pere Marquette Park. Lichtner collaborated with the Riverwalk District BID to contribute to its RiverSculpture! program by placing the sculpture at this location.
