= Schomer Lichtner =

American painter and printmaker

- Born: March 18, 1905; Peoria, Illinois
- Died: May 9, 2006 (aged 101); Milwaukee, Wisconsin
- Education: Wisconsin State College of Milwaukee; Art Students League; University of Wisconsin–Madison
- Known for: Painting, Printmaking
- Style: Social Realism, Regionalism, Abstraction
- Spouse: Ruth Grotenrath

Schomer Lichtner (March 18, 1905 – May 9, 2006) was an American painter, printmaker, and art teacher, in Milwaukee, Wisconsin. Known for his Regionalist murals and humorous paintings featuring cows and ballet dancers, Lichtner was married to Wisconsin artist Ruth Grotenrath for over fifty years, and their works were often included together in exhibitions.

== Biography and work ==
Schomer Lichtner was born on March 18, 1905, in Peoria, Illinois, though he moved to Wisconsin as a child. He studied at the Wisconsin State College of Milwaukee and took courses with painter Gustave Moeller, before moving to New York City to study at the Art Students League. Returning to Wisconsin, Lichtner studied for two years at UW–Madison, including with art historian Oskar Hagen, and graduated in 1929.

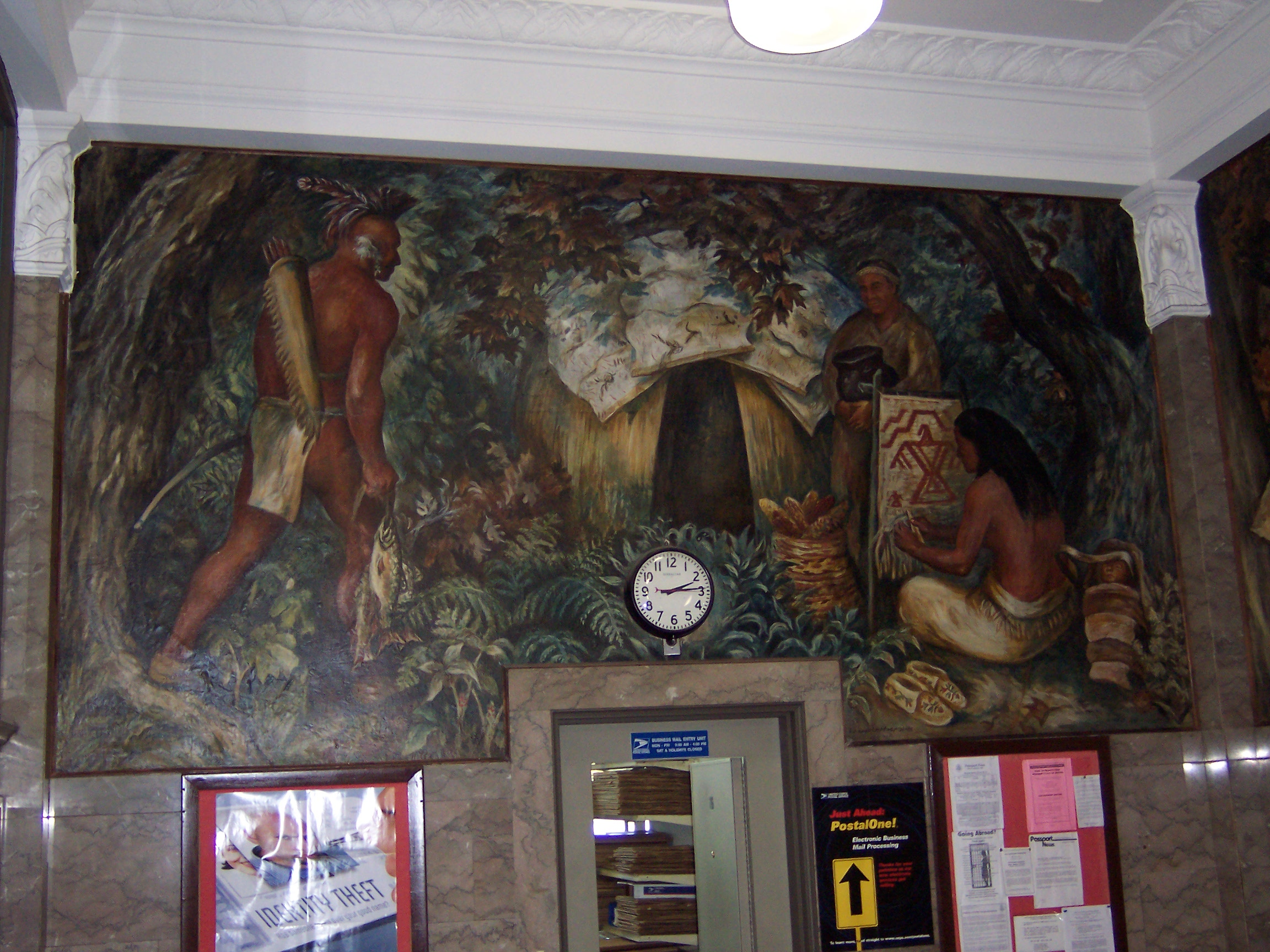
Indian Life, one of Lichtner’s murals for Sheboygan’s main post office

In 1934, he married fellow artist Ruth Grotenrath in Milwaukee, and the couple undertook several projects for the Works Project Administration. Lichtner’s completed jobs include murals painted for the post offices of Sheboygan, Wisconsin, and Hamtramck, Michigan. Following the Second World War, Lichtner and Grotenrath took an interest in Buddhism and Japanese culture. The couple traveled to the country in 1955 with writer Alan Watts, a promoter of East Asian and Dharmic religions who would publish his most famous volume, The Way of Zen, two years later.

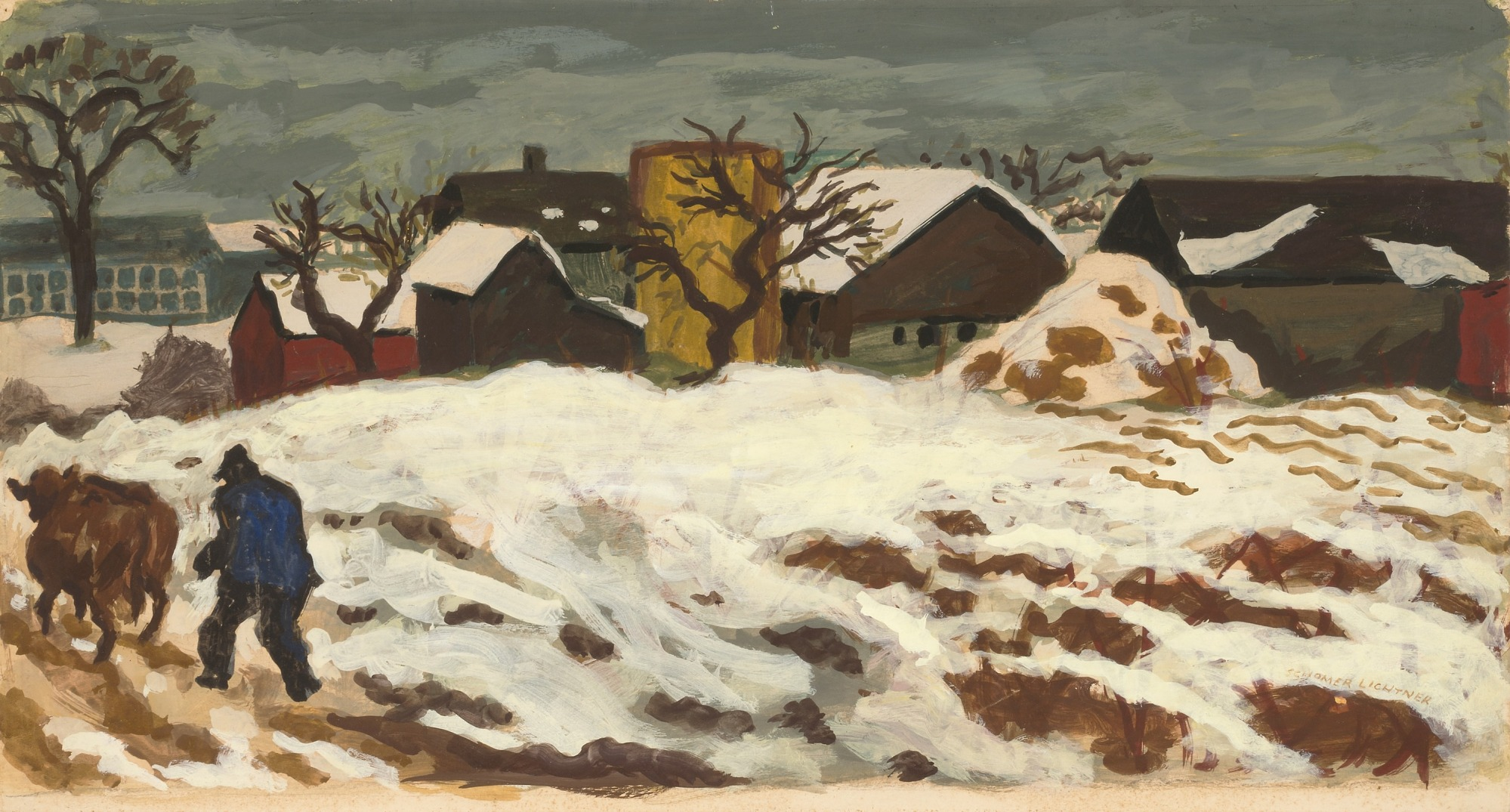
Winter Landscape (1940), Smithsonian American Art Museum

While Japonisme influenced Lichtner from then on, his art most often included depictions of Holstein cows, which he claimed to have grown fond of during summer stays in Washington County, Wisconsin. In parallel, Lichtner became the official artist of the Milwaukee Ballet, and dancers became recurring motifs in his paintings. His 2003 painted steel sculpture Dancing Through Life, installed in Milwaukee’s Pere Marquette Park, illustrates the reunion of these two interests, featuring a ballerina perched on a multicolor cow.

Between 1960 and 1969, Lichtner also taught painting and drawing at the University of Wisconsin–Milwaukee, where one of his students was artist Jan Serr. He died on May 9, 2006, at the age of 101.

== Bibliography ==
- Schomer Lichtner: A Retrospective. Milwaukee: Milwaukee Art Museum. 1984.
- Montgomery, Susan J. (2011). In the Moment: The Life and Art of Schomer Lichtner. West Bend, WI: Museum of Wisconsin Art.
