= Interstate 794 =

Interstate Highway in Milwaukee, Wisconsin

Interstate 794
- Lake Freeway; East–West Freeway
- I-794 highlighted in red

Route information
- Auxiliary route of I-94
- Maintained by WisDOT
- Length: 3.75 mi (6.04 km)
- Existed: 1969–present
- NHS: Entire route

Major junctions
- West end: I-43 / I-94 in Milwaukee
- East end: WIS 794 in Milwaukee

Location
- Country: United States
- State: Wisconsin
- Counties: Milwaukee

Highway system
- Interstate Highway System; Main; Auxiliary; Suffixed; Business; Future; Wisconsin State Trunk Highway System; Interstate; US; State; Scenic; Rustic
← I-535	→ WIS 794

Interstate 794 (I-794; also known as East–West Freeway, Lake Parkway, and Lake Freeway) is a 3.75-mile (6.04 km) auxiliary Interstate Highway in Milwaukee County in the US state of Wisconsin. It is one of two auxiliary Interstates in the Milwaukee metropolitan area, serves the lakefront and the Port of Milwaukee, and connects downtown with the southeastern suburbs of St. Francis, Cudahy, and South Milwaukee.

== Route description ==
I-794 begins at the Marquette Interchange in downtown Milwaukee, where I-94 and I-43 meet. It continues eastward through downtown and turns southward near Lake Michigan at Lincoln Memorial Drive. The route crosses the Milwaukee River and the Port of Milwaukee as well as the Henry Maier Festival Park via the Hoan Bridge. The entire route is elevated on a viaduct. The Interstate designation ends at exit 3 at Carferry Drive, which provides access to the Lake Express ferry to Muskegon, Michigan; the highway continues south as State Trunk Highway 794 (WIS 794), also known as the Lake Parkway, to the intersection of Pennsylvania and Edgerton avenues on Cudahy's west side, running parallel and adjacent to the east side of Milwaukee Mitchell International Airport. Traffic volumes on I-794 range from 40,400 vehicles per day on the Hoan Bridge to 100,000 on the east–west Freeway.

== History ==
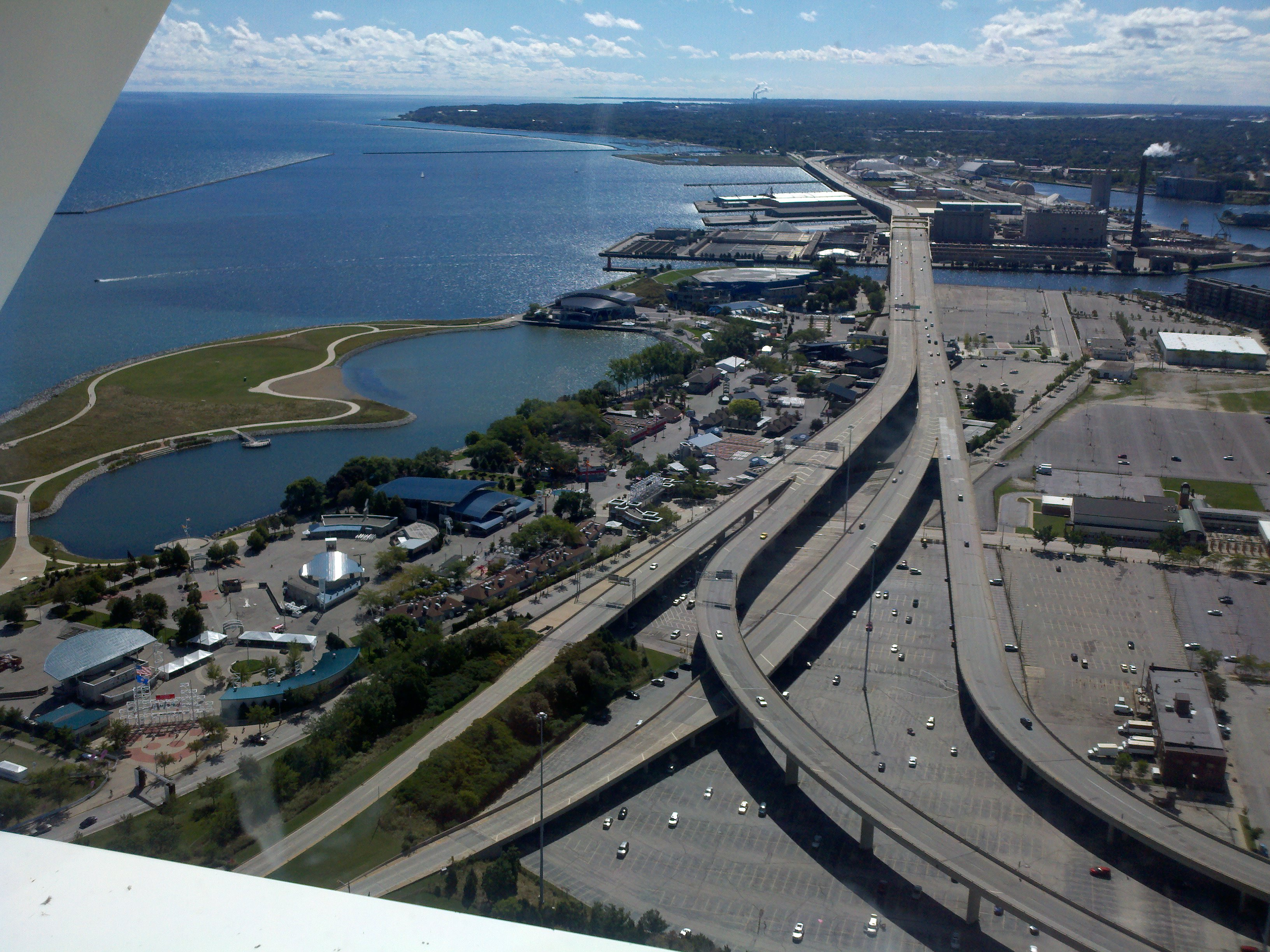
The Lake Freeway as seen from the air

The original plans for the Lake Freeway called for it to begin north of downtown Milwaukee at a connection to the proposed Park East Freeway, then to travel south from the downtown Milwaukee area to Milwaukee Mitchell International Airport. However, the Hoan Bridge was the only segment of the freeway to be built before strong opposition to the freeway resulted in its cancellation. This led to the Hoan Bridge being called the "Bridge to Nowhere" as it sat unused, with both of its ends unconnected to any other road, for three years. The unfinished bridge was long held as being used as the site of the car chase scene in the movie The Blues Brothers. In a 2016 article for the Shepherd Express, author Michael J. Prigge, pointing out that the bridge had been opened for two years when the film was shot, indicated another incomplete segment of I-794 had been used for the scene. An east–west freeway was later constructed between the Marquette Interchange and the Hoan Bridge, creating what is now known as I-794.

As part of his campaign for a more livable city in Milwaukee, Mayor John Norquist proposed to tear down the I-794 portion of the east–west freeway in 1995 in favor of a surface boulevard. His opposition to the freeway was rooted in the freeway cutting off the Historic Third Ward from the rest of downtown Milwaukee and hindering development in the area. His effort failed when suburban opposition to the removal claimed increased traffic volume on the road as well as the new Lake Parkway nearing completion. After opening, the Lake Parkway increased traffic volumes on I-794 to 111,000 vehicles per day by 2004.

The Marquette Interchange construction project, undertaken between 2004 and 2008, rebuilt the east–west viaduct section of I-794 between the interchange and the Milwaukee River.

In February 2010, Milwaukee County Supervisor Patricia Jursik and South Milwaukee Mayor Tom Zepecki proposed a plan to expand I-794/Lake Parkway to Racine County. The expansion would follow an existing railroad corridor and was intended to relieve traffic along I-94.

As of 2023, WisDOT is studying several options for reducing the footprint of or demolishing the portion of I-794 between the Marquette Interchange and the Hoan Bridge, with construction tentatively scheduled to begin in 2026.

== Exit list ==
The entire route is in Milwaukee, Milwaukee County.

mi	km	Exit	Destinations	Notes
0.0	0.0	1A	I-94 west (East–West Freeway) – Madison	Western terminus; western end of East–West Freeway
0.4	0.64	1B	I-43 south (North–South Freeway) / I-94 east – Chicago	
0.4	0.64	1C	I-43 north (North–South Freeway) – Green Bay	
0.6	0.97	1H	St. Paul Avenue / James Lovell Street	Eastbound exit from I-43/I-94 only
0.7	1.1	1D	Plankinton Avenue	Eastbound exit from I-43/I-94 only
0.8– 0.9	1.3– 1.4	Hoan Bridge over the Milwaukee River		
0.9	1.4	1E	EB: Jackson Street south / Van Buren Street north WB: Milwaukee Street – Downtown	Signed eastbound for Jackson and Van Buren streets and westbound for Milwaukee Street
1.1	1.8	1F	EB: Lakefront WB: Michigan Street / Lincoln Memorial Drive	Signed eastbound for the lakefront, and Michigan Street westbound; eastern end of East–West Freeway name ends; northern end of Lake Freeway
2.0	3.2	Hoan Bridge over the Kinnickinnic River		
3.1	5.0	3	Port of Milwaukee	
3.5	5.6	–	WIS 794 south (Lake Parkway)	Eastern terminus; southern end of Lake Freeway
1.000 mi = 1.609 km; 1.000 km = 0.621 mi: Incomplete access
