= Seymour Lipton =

American abstract expressionist sculptor (1903-1986)

- Born: November 6, 1903
- Died: December 15, 1986 (aged 83)
- Education: initially trained as a dentist but focused on sculpture
- Known for: abstract expressionist sculptor

Winter Solstice #2, nickel silver on monel metal, 1957, in the Hirshhorn Museum and Sculpture Garden

Seymour Lipton (6 November 1903 – 15 December 1986) was an American abstract expressionist sculptor. He was a member of the New York School who gained widespread recognition in the 1950s. He initially trained as a dentist but focused on sculpture from 1932. His early choices of medium changed from wood to lead and then to bronze, and he is best known for his work in metal. He made several technical innovations, including brazing nickel-silver rods onto sheets of Monel to create rust resistant forms.

His work is included in the Phillips Collection, the Albright–Knox Art Gallery and the Smithsonian American Art Museum.

== Books ==
Dr. Lori Verderame wrote the definitive monograph on Seymour Lipton entitled Seymour Lipton: An American Sculptor in 1999 published by Hudson Hills Press and the Palmer Museum of Art, Penn State University. The book was based on the author's research conduction to complete her Ph.D. dissertation entitled Seymour Lipton: Themes of Nature in the 1950s The Pennsylvania State University, University Park, PA. Much of his art addresses the themes of flight, nature and war.

== See also ==
- Laureate public sculpture in Milwaukee, Wisconsin
- The Empty Room public sculpture in The Governor Nelson A. Rockefeller Empire State Plaza Art Collection in Albany, New York
