= John Vickery (artist) =

Australian artist

- Born: 1906; Bunyip, Victoria, Australia
- Died: 1983; Califon, New Jersey, United States
- Education: National Gallery of Victoria Art School
- Known for: Painting; Illustration; Advertising design

John Vickery (1906–1983) was an Australian artist. He worked in the fields of op art, abstract expressionism, illustration and advertising. He is the only Australian artist to have been a part of the New York School.

== Life and work ==
Vickery was born in Bunyip, Victoria in Australia in 1906. He relocated to New York, New York in the United States in 1936. He was colleagues with Philip Guston, Jackson Pollock, Joan Mitchell, and Willem de Kooning.

He died in Califon, New Jersey in 1983.

== Notable collections ==
- Halo, 1970, synthetic polymer paint on composition board; in the collection of the National Gallery of Victoria, Melbourne, Australia
