= Gustave Moeller =

American painter

Gustave Moeller (1881– February 11, 1931) was an American-born artist who was most well known for painting, especially painting American towns and villages.

== Education ==
Moeller was born in New Holstein, Wisconsin, but moved to Milwaukee at a young age. As a teen Moeller attended the Milwaukee Art Students’ League with young artists such as Edward Steichen. Moeller was one of the first students at the Milwaukee Art Students' League. Gustave then took classes at the Chicago Art Institute while working as a commercial engraver. Moeller also attended the Academy of Fine Arts in New York, New York, and the Royal Academy of Fine Arts in Munich, Germany, where he was taught by Carl von Marr.

== Career ==
Moeller was a well known and respected art teacher at the School of Fine and Applied Arts in Milwaukee. He also was a member of the Milwaukee Men's Sketch Club, on the Board of Trustees of the Milwaukee Art Institute, the Milwaukee Art Commission and Wisconsin Painters & Sculptors. Gustave was known for his vibrant, colorful landscapes and often painting at various places in rural Wisconsin.

== Death ==
Gustave died in Milwaukee, Wisconsin in 1931 at the age of 49 from complications following an operation.

== Award ==
Moeller was awarded a Wisconsin Visual Art Lifetime Achievement Award in 2005.
