= Museum of Wisconsin Art =

Art museum in West Bend, Wisconsin

Coordinates: 43°25′30.0″N 88°10′53.1″W

Museum of Wisconsin Art (MOWA)
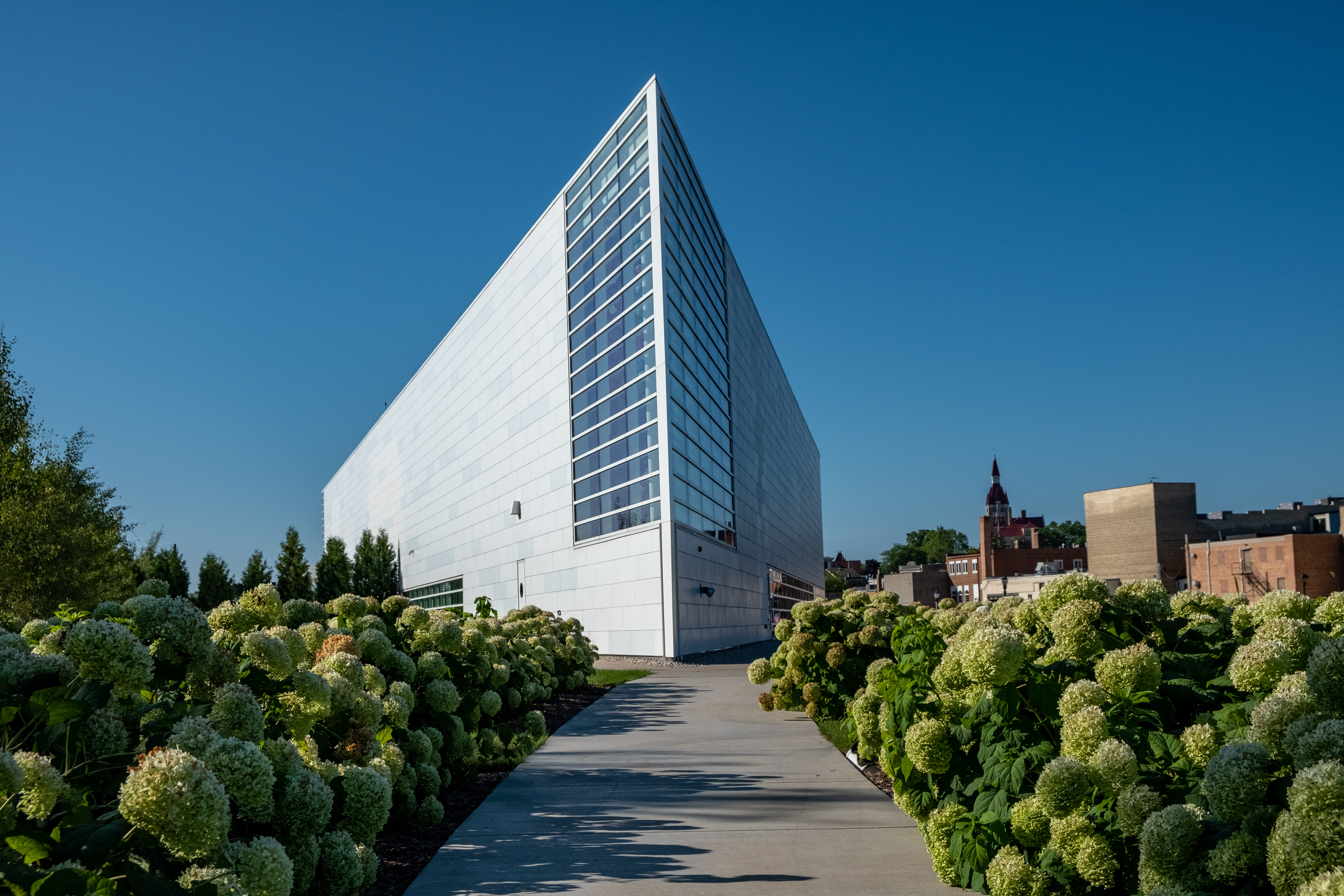
- Museum of Wisconsin Art in 2021
- Former name: West Bend Art Museum
- Established: 1961; 65 years ago
- Location: 205 Veterans Avenue; West Bend, Wisconsin 53090, United States
- Type: Art museum
- Website: wisconsinart.org

The Museum of Wisconsin Art (formerly the West Bend Art Museum) is a museum that collects and exhibits contemporary and historical art from the state of Wisconsin. Its collections include rotating historical and contemporary exhibitions and educational programs. The museum's One Gallery features solo shows of contemporary Wisconsin artists and arts organizations several times each year.

== History ==
Founded by the Pick family of West Bend, Wisconsin in 1961 to collect the works of Milwaukee-born artist Carl von Marr (1858-1936), the museum currently holds the most comprehensive collection of his work anywhere.

In 1988, it broadened its focus to become a regional museum, rolling out a collection of Wisconsin artists spanning the years from 1820 to 1950. In 1998, its Early Wisconsin Art Collection was unveiled on the state’s sesquicentennial, reflecting its new mission to collect, conserve, document, and exhibit Wisconsin art through the ages. In January 2007, along with the name change, it began including both contemporary Wisconsin art, and work prior to 1820.

The museum opened a new building on the banks of the Milwaukee River in West Bend in April, 2012.
