= Milwaukee Riverwalk =

Riverside pedestrian walkway in Milwaukee, Wisconsin

Coordinates: 43°02′25.63″N 87°54′40.10″W

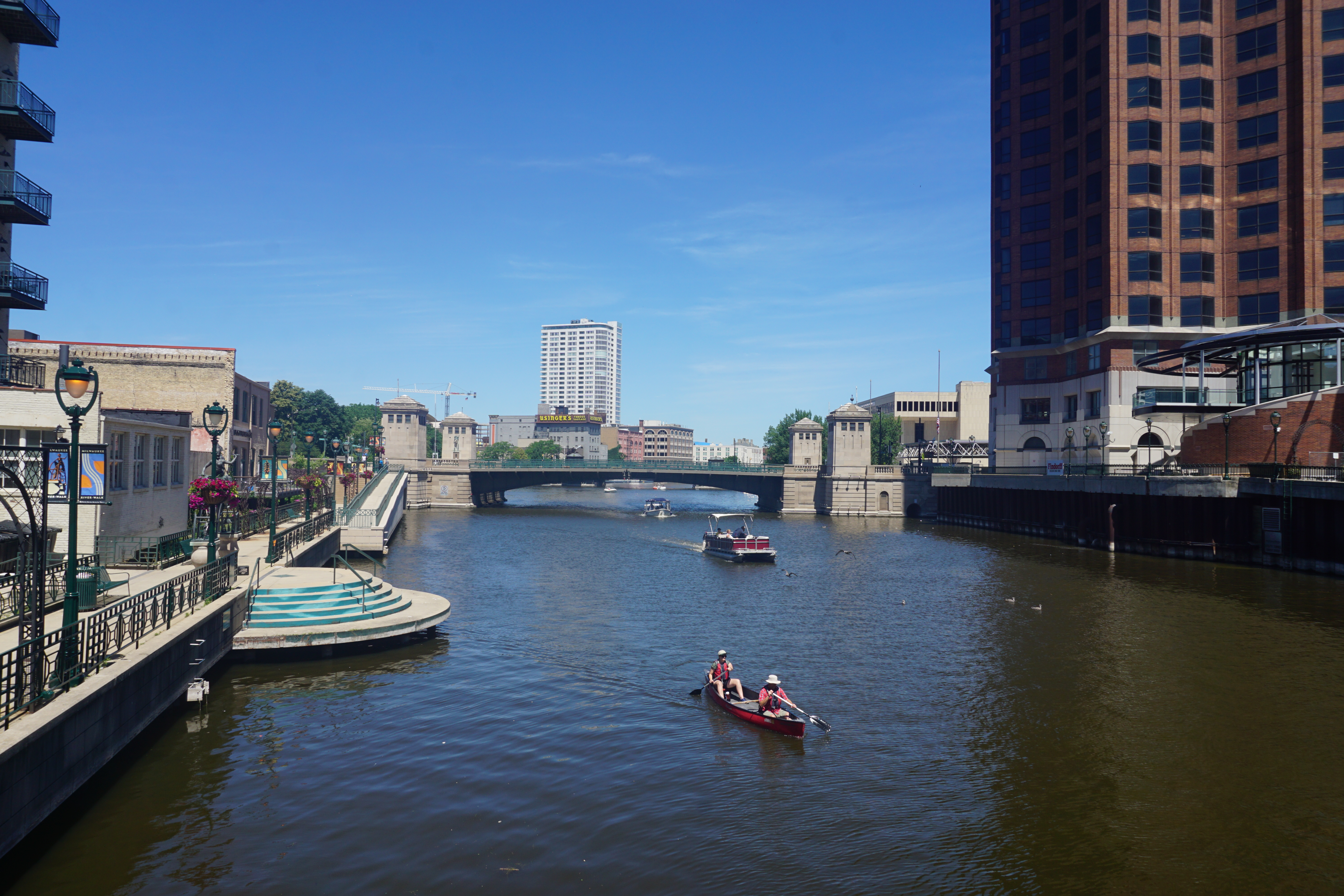
Milwaukee Riverwalk

Map

The Milwaukee Riverwalk is a continuous pedestrian walkway along the Milwaukee River in Milwaukee, Wisconsin.

== History ==
The Milwaukee Riverwalk began in 1994. Since 1999, the city of Milwaukee had required all new riverfront development to have a public section of the Riverwalk available, with the city covering most of the construction costs. The requirement was extended into the Menomonee Valley in 2017, then along the Kinnickinnic River in 2018.

In 2012, the Riverwalk was extended to connect to the Beerline Trail. As of 2025, nearly 85% of the originally planned system through Downtown Milwaukee and the Historic Third Ward had been built.

== Description ==
The Milwaukee Riverwalk includes art displays called RiverSculpture!, the RiverSplash! festival (which ended a 20-year run in 2009), Riverwalk Park, water taxi landings, and other venues such as cafés, and brewpubs.

The Milwaukee Riverwalk extends from the Historic Third Ward district to Caesars Park near Brady Street. It also links to the Hank Aaron State Trail, Lakeshore State Park, and Erie Street Plaza. There are three segments of the Milwaukee Riverwalk: the Beerline B, East Town (Juneautown) & Westown (Kilbourntown), and the 3rd & 5th Ward. The Beerline B runs from McKinley Avenue to Caesars Park, the East Town (Juneautown) & Westown (Kilbourntown) section from Juneau Avenue to I-794, and the 3rd & 5th Ward section from I-794 to Lake Michigan.

Cemented in to the walkways are 18 bronze medallions drawn by elementary school children, depicting how they see the Milwaukee River. In 1995, students were invited to examine artifacts from the Milwaukee County Historical Society and walk the river. Among drawings submitted by over 200 students from Milwaukee Public Schools, 18 were selected to be cast by artist Peter Flanary. Imagery varies from whimsical fish and downtown buildings to ducks and Native Americans.

According to Up North News, the Milwaukee Riverwalk features several public art installations, including the Bronze Fonz, a statue created by Gerald P. Sawyer in 2008. The statue depicts Fonzie from the television series Happy Days and is located between Wells Street and Mason Street. Another installation, Dream with the Fishes for Aurora, was designed by artist Cork Marcheschi in 1998 and is located along the Riverside Theater. The installation was constructed using aluminum, stainless steel, and vinyl. It underwent renovations in 2015, including the addition of LED lighting. Another sculpture, Supporting the Question, was designed by Jeremy Shamrowicz and installed at Mason Street Landing in 2012.

The Riverwalk also contains a collection of sculptures near Juneau Avenue. According to Urban Milwaukee, four of these works belong to the Elmer Winter Sculpture Collection, which was donated by Manpower Inc. The installations include Vertical Spirit, A Phoenix, Israeli Figures, and Crescimus. The final sculpture was created by Elmer Winter, the founder of Manpower Inc., and its title loosely translates to "together we grow."

Other sculptures along the Riverwalk incorporate reused materials. Near the pedestrian bridge, artist John Ready created River Gems, a collection of sculptures made from reclaimed objects. Ready previously worked as a jeweler, and the arrangement of the materials resembles oversized pieces of jewelry when sunlight strikes them. Across Highland Avenue, Paul Sebban's Limitation Bowls are four foot tall cast iron sculptures. Although they are used as planters during the summer, they were originally intended to be viewed as sculptural bowls.

Pere Marquette Park also contains several public sculptures. One installation depicts the French missionary Pere Marquette holding a cross. Behind the sculpture is a granite wall featuring an image of a Native American traveling in a canoe. Another sculpture, Dancing Through Life, was created by Schomer Lichtner and was inspired by dancers from the Milwaukee Ballet. The painted steel sculpture depicts a ballerina positioned on top of a cow and is located near the Riverwalk entrance to Pere Marquette Park.

Near Kilbourn Avenue, Robert Smart's S.S. Core is constructed from reused propane tank components. The sculpture is shaped like a globe and incorporates repurposed end caps from propane tanks. Artist Beth Sahagian also created Accqua Grylli, which represents a mythical female figure accompanied by a bronze arch. The arrangement of the figure and arch has been interpreted as representing a guardian or gatekeeper. The Milwaukee Riverwalk Mural Collection introduced another form of public art along the downtown riverfront. According to Urban Milwaukee, three murals had been installed by January 2025, with a fourth planned for the following spring. The collection was developed to engage pedestrians and people traveling along the river across a mile long section of the Riverwalk. The project involved several organizations, including the Downtown Placemaking Task Force, Milwaukee Riverwalk District, Milwaukee Theater District, Visit Milwaukee, and the City of Milwaukee. Artists were selected through a request for proposals process launched in August 2024. One of the murals, Buoyancy, was created by an artist known as CERA and is located on the Juneau Avenue Lift Bridge tower. The mural depicts a musician following a source of light. Its design references the performing art venues located nearby. According to Urban Milwaukee, the mural is part of CERA's Light Seekers series, which depicts people during moments of curiosity and exploration.

Another mural was created by Milwaukee artist Brian Kaspr near River Bank Plaza. Kaspr gathered input from more than 140 community members to develop the design. The mural includes images of Milwaukee landmarks, native plants, and patterns associated with Indigenous tribes. Examples of landmarks incorporated into the design include Milwaukee City Hall and the Hoan Bridge. A third mural, Luminous Waters, was created by artists Thyla Arden and Ayda Rose of Unnaturell Design Co. The installation is located beneath the Knapp Street Bridge. Its design focuses on the biological diversity of the Milwaukee River and includes representations of fish, otters, frogs, and aquatic plants. The mural emphasizes the river's ecosystem by depicting several species found in or near the waterway, rather than focusing on Milwaukee Landmarks. In January 2025, a fourth mural titled Vessels of Milwaukee was planned for installation near the Marcus Performing Arts Center. The artwork was designed by Christina Vang of La Bang Studio. Its proposed design featured containers of different shapes and sizes intended to represent aspects of Milwaukee's riverfront and theater district. The mural was scheduled for installation later in 2025. According to the January 2025 article, the proposed artwork was intended to represent the stories and distinctive features of the Milwaukee Riverwalk and Milwaukee Theater District.

== See also ==
- Chicago Riverwalk
- Detroit International Riverfront
- Milwaukee Skywalk
- San Antonio River Walk
