= 2025 Milwaukee area floods =

2025 flood in Milwaukee County

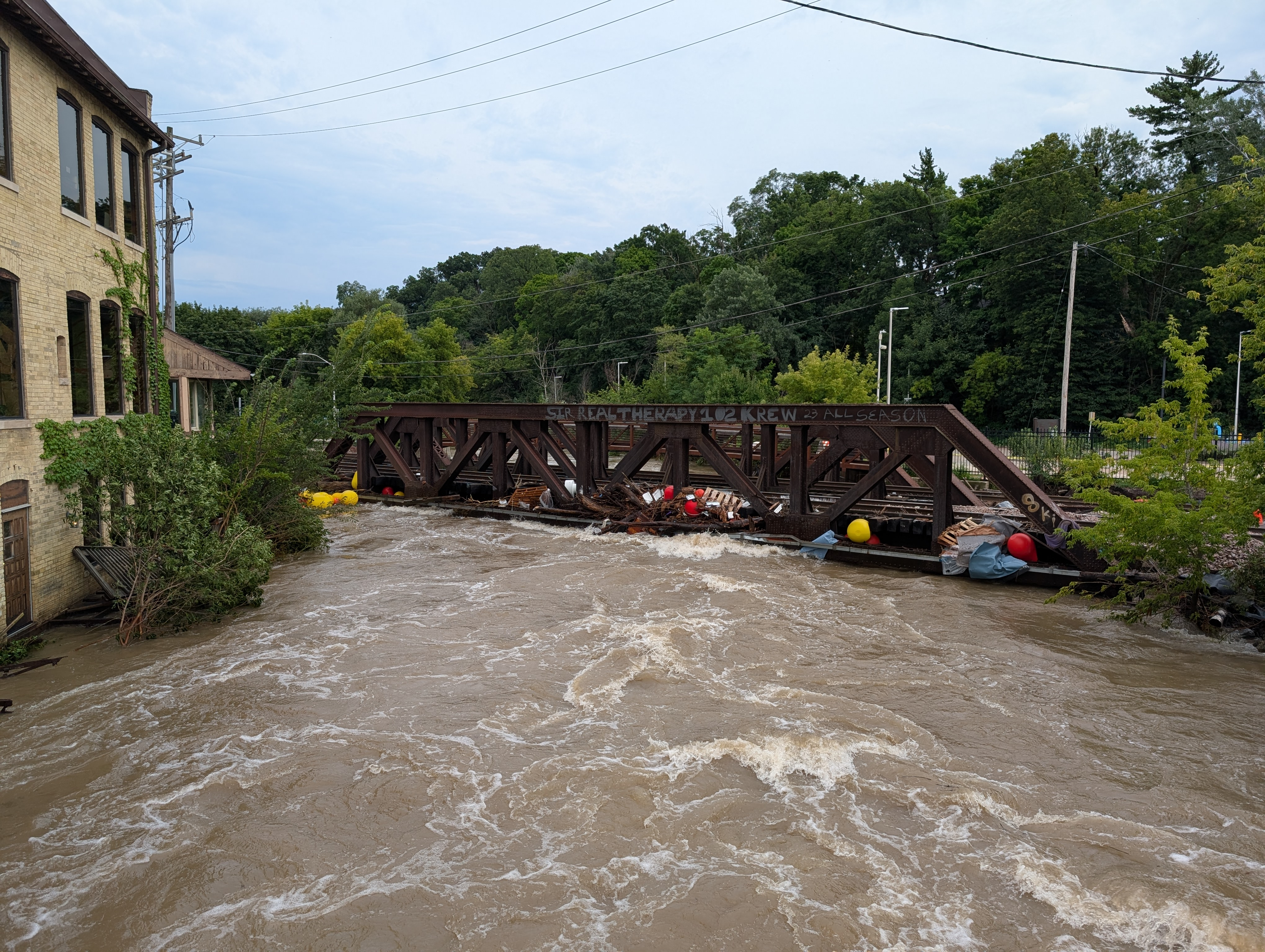
Flooding in Wauwatosa, Wisconsin, hours after the river crested

On August 9–10, 2025, a series of severe flash floods impacted Milwaukee and its surrounding areas. The suburb of Wauwatosa was particularly affected. The floods were the result of an unusual weather system that dropped record-setting rain into the area; it was the second-most recorded rain Milwaukee had ever seen over a two-day period. At least two people drowned when the Kinnickinnic River was flooding, and major property damages were reported around the region. The Wisconsin State Fair canceled its final day after significant flooding. Wisconsin Governor Tony Evers declared a state of emergency to assist in cleanup efforts, and US President Donald Trump's administration granted one of two requests for disaster relief funds.

== Background ==
Until August 8, it was not clear that Milwaukee and its surrounding areas would face a large amount of rain. A cold front became stuck over the region in the face of two other systems, and changing winds led to an increase in humidity and a plethora of thunderstorms impacting a small area. The weather system had previously blown through Kansas and Nebraska, and a total of 14 million people across a swath of US states were put under flood watches.

A National Weather Service (NWS) meteorologist described the difficulty in predicting the storm's rainfall:

One of the challenges was the forecast models that we were using. We were having a really hard time picking up on exactly where the storms are going to go. There were some forecast models that were showing absolutely nothing going through, and then we had some other ones that were showing more of these late evening storms developing along kind of a west-east boundary and just continuously reforming for multiple hours. The situation we were in on Saturday was trying to figure out which models are initializing the best and which ones can we go with.

Another NWS meteorologist summarized the situation as a "really bad overlap of circumstances". The subsequent NWS summary of the storm stated:

A stalled frontal boundary served as the focus for thunderstorm development across southeastern Wisconsin on August 9. The presence of this front along with an extremely moist air mass (precipitable water values near 2") set the stage for extreme rainfall rates with thunderstorms.

All together, the NWS initially predicted that the region would receive up to 2 in (51 mm) of rain, with higher amounts occurring west of Madison. Instead, an area between Milwaukee and Waukesha, well to the east of Madison, received 7 to 10 in (180 to 250 mm).

== Impact ==
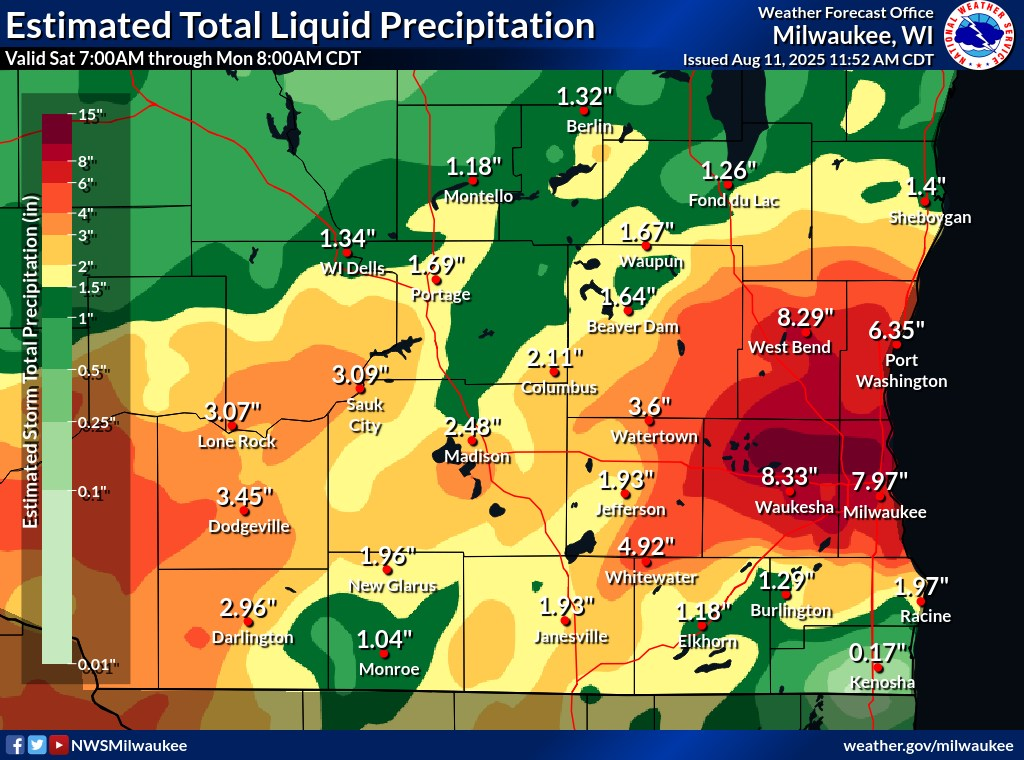
Estimated two-day rainfall total

The weather event hit the Milwaukee area on the night of August 9, a Saturday when many people were attending a Milwaukee Brewers baseball game or events and concerts at the Wisconsin State Fair. Both venues were within the flood plains of the Menomonee River, and the fairgrounds were built atop Honey Creek.

At the fairgrounds, major flooding entered the park. Photos from attendees showed people wading through water deep enough to submerge cars. A concert by the classic rock band Lynyrd Skynyrd was canceled. All but one of Milwaukee Mitchell International Airport's runways were flooded, as well as various taxiways and one underpass. Cars parked on the lower floors of a parking garage of Potawatomi Hotel Casino suffered heavy damage, and flooding led to an estimated $1 million in losses for a towing business located in Milwaukee's Miller Valley neighborhood.

In the wider Milwaukee area, the Milwaukee County Office of Emergency Management later reported that over 2,200 homes were severely damaged or destroyed during the storm. Hundreds of cars were also abandoned in the face of rising flood waters. The Milwaukee Fire Department responded to over 600 calls for assistance, including 65 water rescues. Basements were flooded across the county, and major property damages were reported. Homes in one part of the northwestern reaches of Milwaukee were inundated with 2 to 3 feet (0.61 to 0.91 m) of water. At least 47,000 people were left without power, and 38,000 people went without it for over ten hours. The Milwaukee Metropolitan Sewerage District started a sewer overflow (sending excess sewage into rivers and lakes) at about 9:55 pm on August 10 in the hope of avoiding sewage backups into properties. By August 12, about 1,500 people in Milwaukee County had reported damages, and local officials were encouraging more to report their damages to help the county obtain disaster relief funds from the US federal government.

Multiple rivers in the region—the Kinnickinnic, Milwaukee, Menomonee, and Root—crested at record levels. The Milwaukee River's topping out of 11.19 feet (3.41 m) bested its previous recorded record of 10.48 feet (3.19 m). In addition, the Fox River in Waukesha reached near-record heights. Flood warnings for Milwaukee River, Lower Fox River at Waukesha, Menomonee River at Menomonee Falls, the Milwaukee River near Cedarburg, and Cedar Creek at Cedarburg were extended through August 12 by the National Weather Service due to their continued flood stages. A similar flood warning for the Root River at Franklin in Milwaukee County was set to expire in the afternoon of August 12.

At least two people drowned while the region was affected by flooding. Both lived at a homeless encampment that was located under a bridge that spanned the Kinnickinnic River and was flooded by it. Another three people from the same camp were listed as missing and unaccounted for.

The final day of the Wisconsin State Fair (August 10) was canceled due to the floods, as was part of a 2025 USA Triathlon event being held in Milwaukee. The Olympic-distance national championships were held on August 9 and were unaffected; a sprint and paratriathlon scheduled for the 10th were canceled. A Brewers baseball game scheduled for August 10 went ahead as scheduled even though two of the main roads to the stadium and approximately half of their parking spots were blocked by floodwaters. About 33,700 of the 42,461 ticketed patrons were able to attend.

=== Suburban areas ===
==== Wauwatosa ====
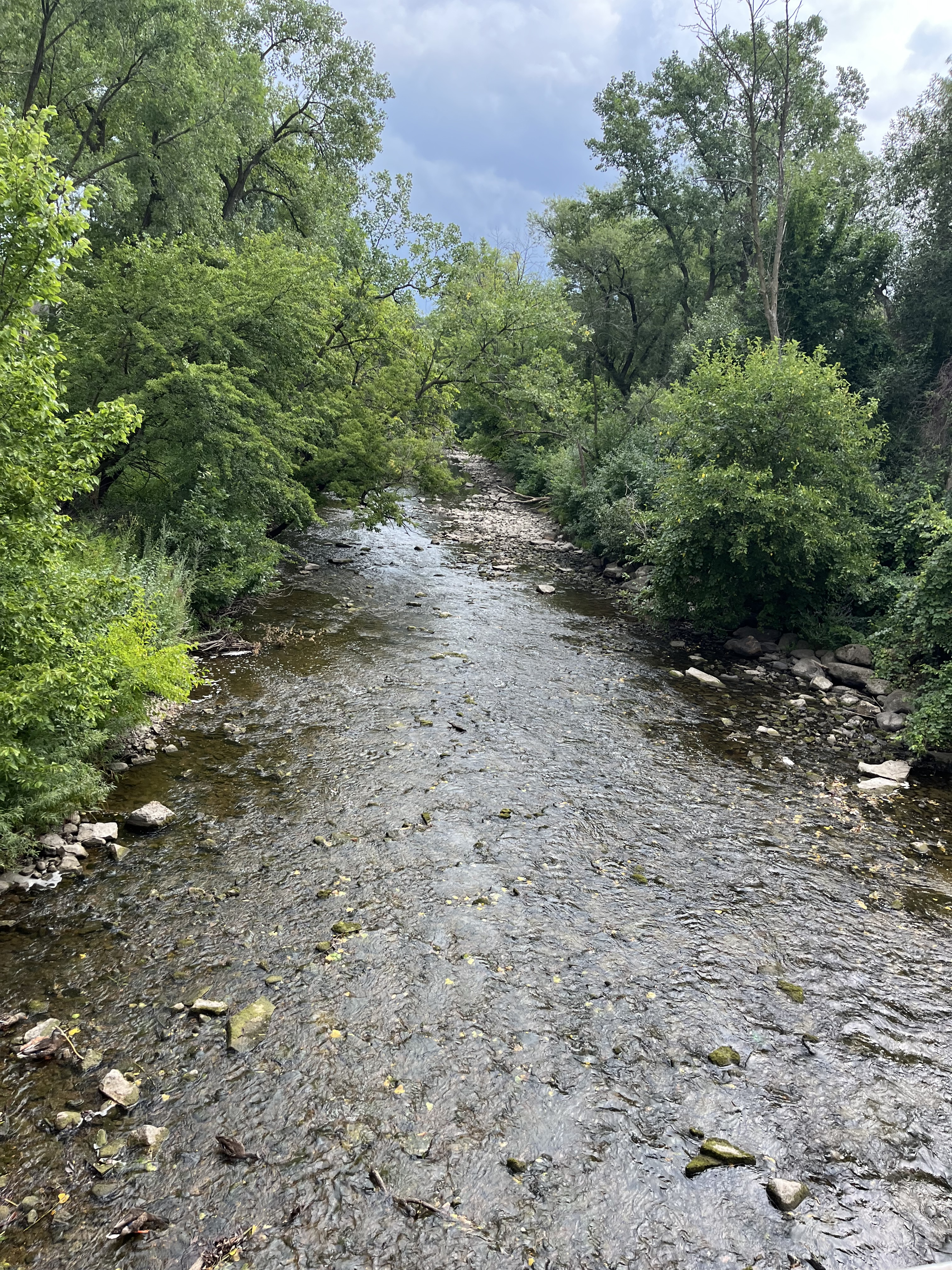
The Menomonee River at 17:33, August 9, 2025, on the Swan Blvd Bridge in Wauwatosa

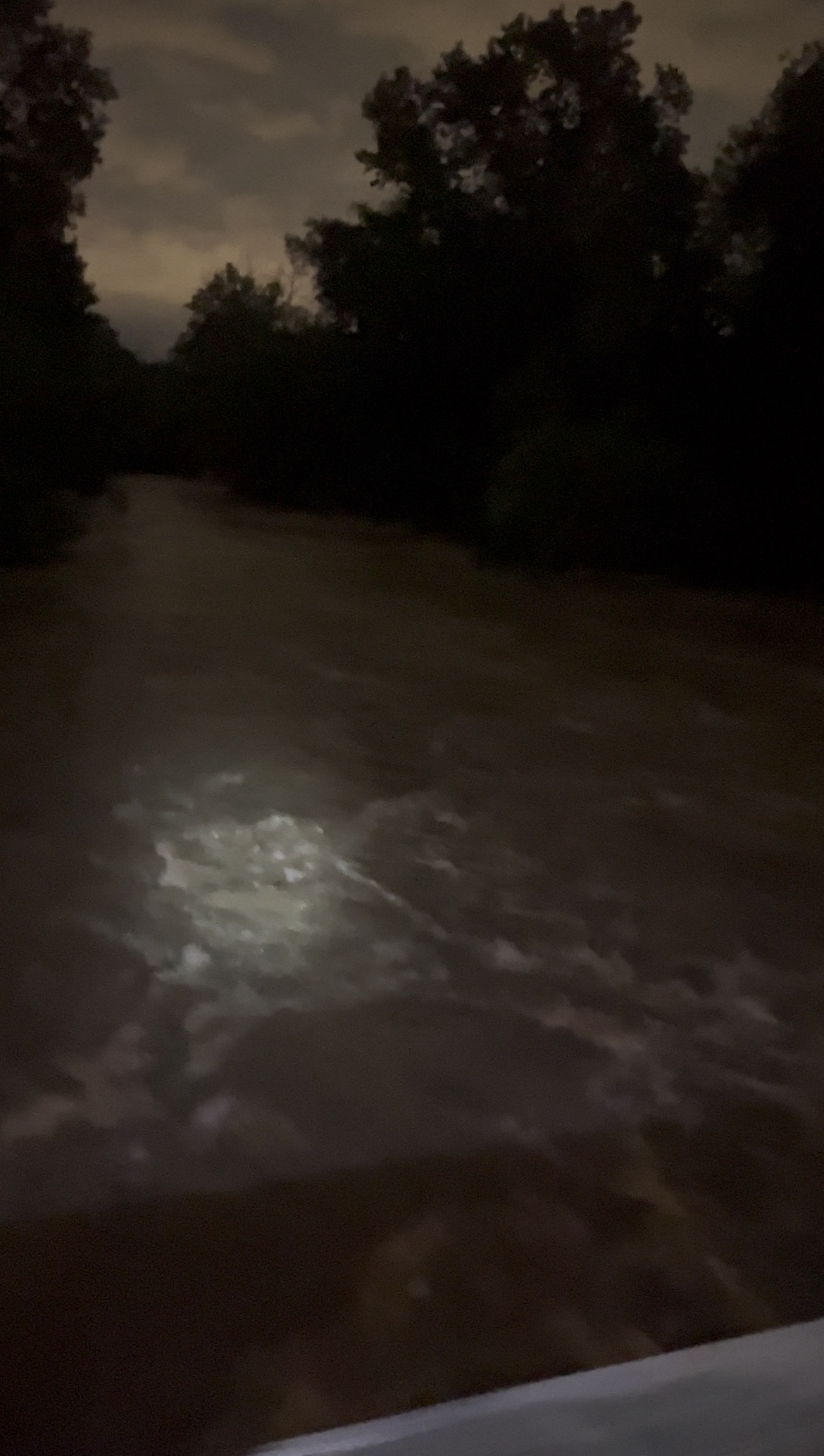
Image taken from same place about 11 hours after

The village of Wauwatosa was particularly impacted after the Menominee River, which runs alongside its downtown, overflowed. At least 70 people had to be rescued during and after the storm.

The Wauwatosa director of public works estimated that the number of affected village homes was in the hundreds. Wauwatosa's flagship Hart Park, designed to take on floodwater to protect the village's downtown, suffered significant damage: a Milwaukee Magazine freelancer observed that the backstop at the park's softball field had "crumpled", and the turf at a stadium where multiple high school football teams played was "rippled". That turf ended up being unusable, and those football teams had to play their 2025 games in other locations. The damages to Wauwatosa's public lands, including Hart Park, were estimated at $4 million.

Multiple businesses in the village were forced to close due to flooding damage. The kitchen at Cafe Hollander, a popular restaurant located next to the river, was flooded with 4 feet (1.2 m) of water. Hollander's owners announced that they were facing up to $1 million in losses thanks to an estimated three-quarters of their equipment rendered unusable; severe damage to the restaurant's plumbing, electrical system, and walls; and a needed six weeks for repairs.

==== Outer suburbs ====
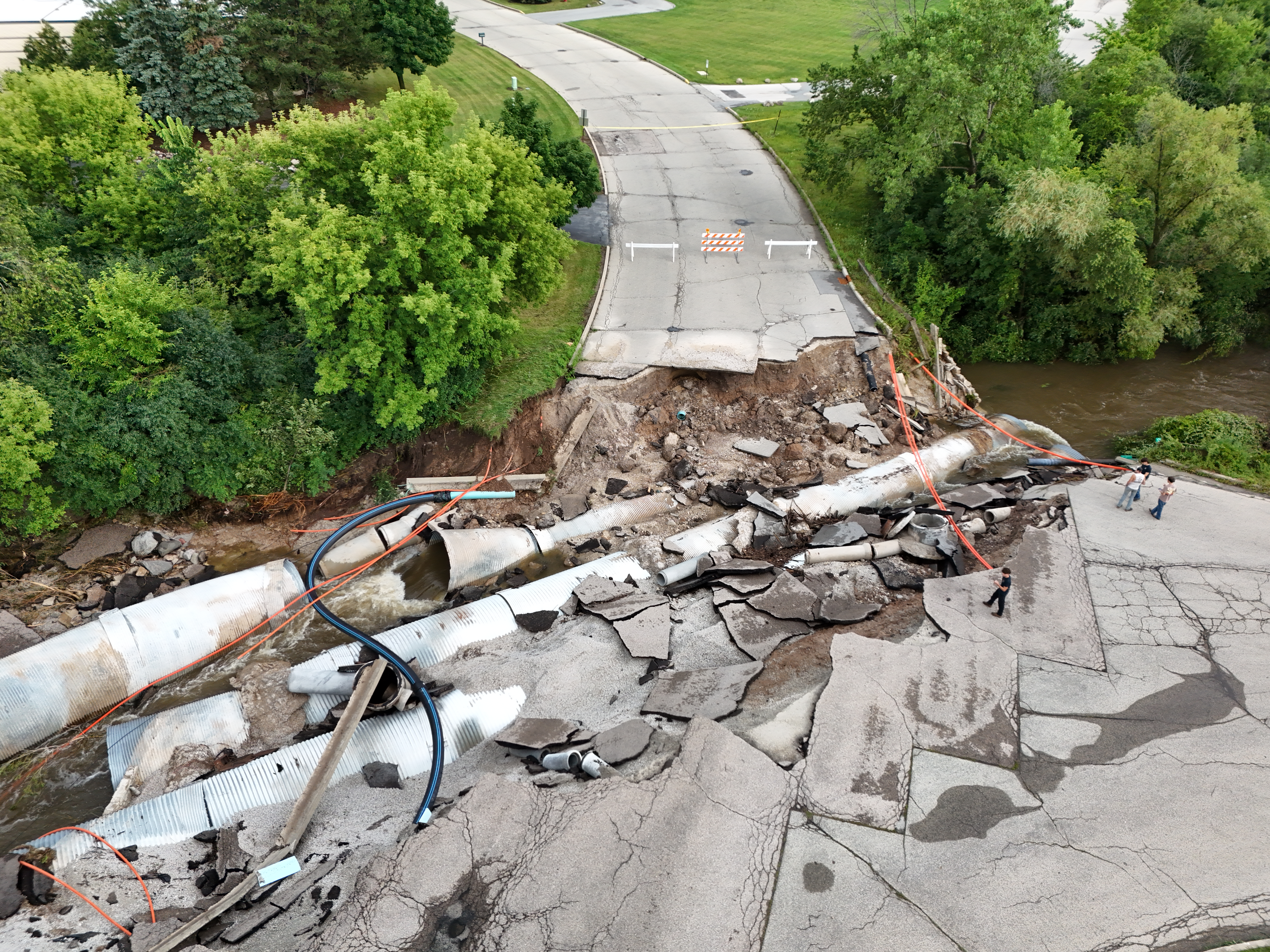
A road washed out in Menomonee Falls

Waukesha and Ozaukee counties were both put under flood warnings. A sewage treatment plant in Cedarburg in Ozaukee County overflowed, sending 250,000 US gallons (950,000 L; 210,000 imp gal) of wastewater into Cedar Creek. The city of Waukesha experienced flooding from the nearby Fox River, which crested on the evening of August 11. Multiple streets in the city were closed, and they added weight to a bridge to ensure the floodwaters did not lift it. In Brookfield, the director of public works estimated that hundreds of homes had been flooded to some degree.

==== Other areas ====
West Allis, another suburb and located near the State Fair Park, also suffered significant flooding that submerged resident's cars. At least eleven homes received major foundation damage, such as the loss of a retaining wall. Part of the city is built over or next to Honey Creek, which significantly overtopped its banks due to the extreme rainfall and debris blocking the entrance to a 2.5-mile (4.0 km)-long underground culvert it flows through. The culverts had been installed in the 1960s and were designed to handle water from far smaller storms.

A 13-year-old boy who tried to swim in the flooded Root River near Franklin was briefly swept away by floodwaters before being rescued.

== Aftermath ==
Wisconsin's estimate of the flood's total costs on public infrastructure across five southeastern Wisconsin counties was $43 million. Another $33 million in damage was done to residential homes across the counties of Milwaukee, Waukesha, and Ozaukee. Milwaukee County estimated that it suffered $34 million in losses from damage to public infrastructure, including 20 to 25 affected areas within Milwaukee County's park system. The county also catalogued over 1,500 houses as having "major damage", and 51 were "destroyed". Conversely, some residents of Mequon whose homes were not swamped by floodwaters despite living in a government-designated floodplain petitioned for local government support to re-designate their homes. That change would allow the residents to drop required but expensive flood insurance.

The amount of water dropped over the area—some 35 billion US gallons (130 Gl)—overwhelmed Milwaukee's combined sewer system and Deep Tunnel. The Milwaukee Metropolitan Sewerage District, which typically cleans and stores about 1.1 billion US gallons (4.2 Gl) of wastewater per day, was forced to let 5.14 billion US gallons (19.5 Gl) of untreated wastewater overflow into rivers and Lake Michigan over the course of 78 hours. It was the largest-ever sewer overflow since the tunnel's construction. Officials credited $580 million in previous green infrastructure and flood management construction projects for limiting the amount of flooding.

By the time emergency operations wrapped up about two weeks after the flooding, 23,000 people had visited city of Milwaukee locations to rid themselves of flood-impacted items. In addition, the city's Public Works Department collected large, harder to transport items from about 15,000 homes.

About a month after the flooding, 50 people were still living in Red Cross-run shelters. Thousands more were awaiting a potential federal disaster declaration that would unlock funds for them to restore their homes.

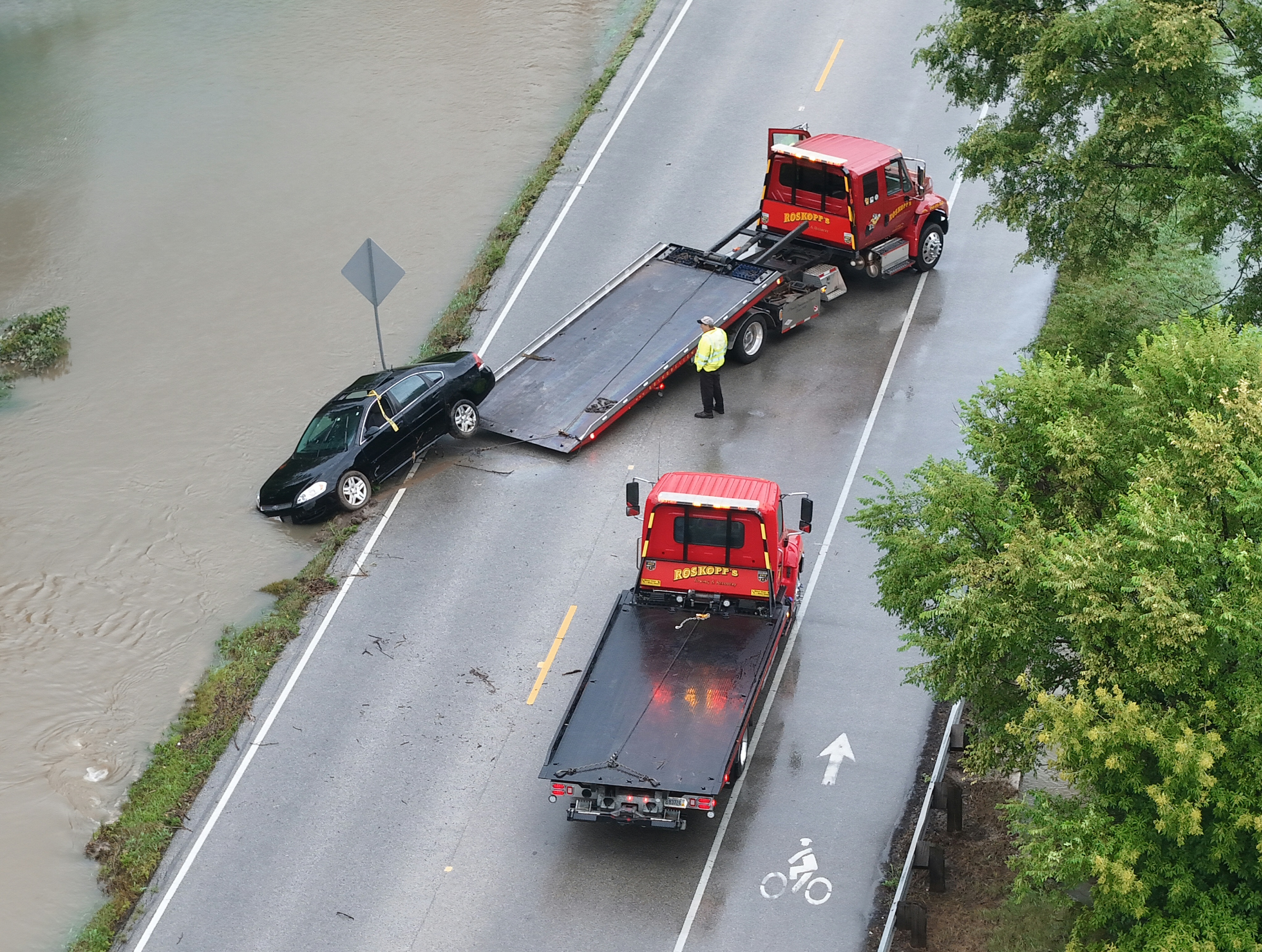
A vehicle being removed from flood waters in Menomonee Falls

=== Political response ===
Multiple levels of government declared a state of emergency in reaction to the flooding to allow additional resources to be devoted to recovery efforts. Milwaukee County Executive David Crowley declared a county-wide emergency on August 10. Tony Evers, the governor of Wisconsin, declared one on August 11. On the floodings, Evers said in a statement:

Disastrous storms and flash flooding across our state in recent days have displaced kids and families and damaged homes, businesses, community centers, and so much more. The damage caused by recent extreme weather is extensive, and it’s going to take significant time and resources to recover, repair infrastructure, and help support the folks and communities who have been affected.

On August 13, Evers formally requested Federal Emergency Management Agency (FEMA) assistance with a formal federal preliminary damage assessment, and he followed that up on August 27 with a request for a presidential disaster declaration. The Trump administration approved $29.8 million in disaster relief funds on September 12.

However, the Trump administration denied a separate $26.5 million request for funds to address damage to public infrastructure in six Wisconsin counties (Door, Grant, Milwaukee, Ozaukee, Washington, and Waukesha), saying that it was "not warranted". They also denied the Wisconsin state government's formal appeal of that decision, causing Evers to ask the state's congressional representatives to use their influence to induce a reconsideration.

Wisconsin's governor Tony Evers and Milwaukee County's executive David Crowley criticized the decision to deny aid. Evers stated that "local governments are being asked to shoulder what the federal government has historically helped to bear, including infrastructure repairs, restoration of services, and mitigation work to protect residents from future harm. That should not be the experience of any state." Crowley opined that "communities rely on intergovernmental partnerships in times of crisis, and this decision by the Trump administration erodes that public trust." Milwaukee County estimated that the denial would cost them an $22 million in unreimbursed repairs to public infrastructure.

By October 10, nearly $92 million had been separately distributed through FEMA individual assistance claims and Small Business Administration loans. It was FEMA's second-most expensive disaster of the year, slotting in behind the January 2025 Southern California wildfires.

=== Rainfall amounts ===
Much of the area between Milwaukee and Waukesha received between 7 to 10 inches (180 to 250 mm), with cities and towns directly north and south of the city getting lower totals.

Some local totals were even higher, particularly on Milwaukee's northwest side and the suburbs beyond; the maximum amount of measured rainfall exceeded the amount of water that the city receives over the course of a typical summer. At the top of the list was the James Madison Academic Campus in northwestern Milwaukee, which saw 14.69 in (373 mm) of rain over a 48-hour period as measured by the Milwaukee Metropolitan Sewerage District. Of that rainfall, 14.55 in (370 mm) fell within 24 hours, primarily between 6 p.m. on August 9 and 3 a.m. on August 10. Scientists with Wisconsin's State Climate Extremes Committee later confirmed that the total recorded rainfall was a new statewide record for 24-hour precipitation.

As tabulated by the National Weather Service's Milwaukee office, official totals near or above 8 in (200 mm) included:

- 3 mi (4.8 km) east of Pewaukee: 12.61 in (320 mm)
- Butler: 12.22 in (310 mm)
- Menomonee Falls: 12.05 in (306 mm)
- About 4 mi (6.4 km) northwest of downtown Milwaukee: 11.71 in (297 mm)
- Brookfield: 11.26 in (286 mm)
- Bayside: 10.09 in (256 mm)
- Hartland: 9.75 in (248 mm)
- 2 mi (3.2 km) miles southeast of Waukesha: 9.75 in (248 mm)
- Downtown Milwaukee: 9.34 in (237 mm)
- Port Washington: 9.19 in (233 mm)
- Oconomowoc Lake, Wisconsin: 9 in (230 mm)
- West Allis: 8.94 in (227 mm)
- Sussex: 8.92 in (227 mm)
- Greenfield: 8.77 in (223 mm)
- Brown Deer: 8.46 in (215 mm)
- River Hills: 8.40 in (213 mm)
- Glendale: 8.35 in (212 mm)
- Wauwatosa: 7.99 in (203 mm)

== Legacy ==
These flash floods represented a thousand-year flood for Milwaukee, which refers to an event that has a .1% chance to occur each year. The storm dumped the most recorded rain that Wisconsin had ever recorded in a 24-hour period, and it was the second-most rainfall Milwaukee had ever recorded in a 48-hour period. In a wider lens, the floods were the culmination of a long-term increasing precipitation trend in the southern half of Wisconsin—up 17% since 1950.

The National Weather Service committed to examining a decision to send a flash flood alert to cell phones in the region at about 1 am, which local meteorologists had criticized as being made too late.

== See also ==
- 2010 Milwaukee flood
