= Weather of 2025 =

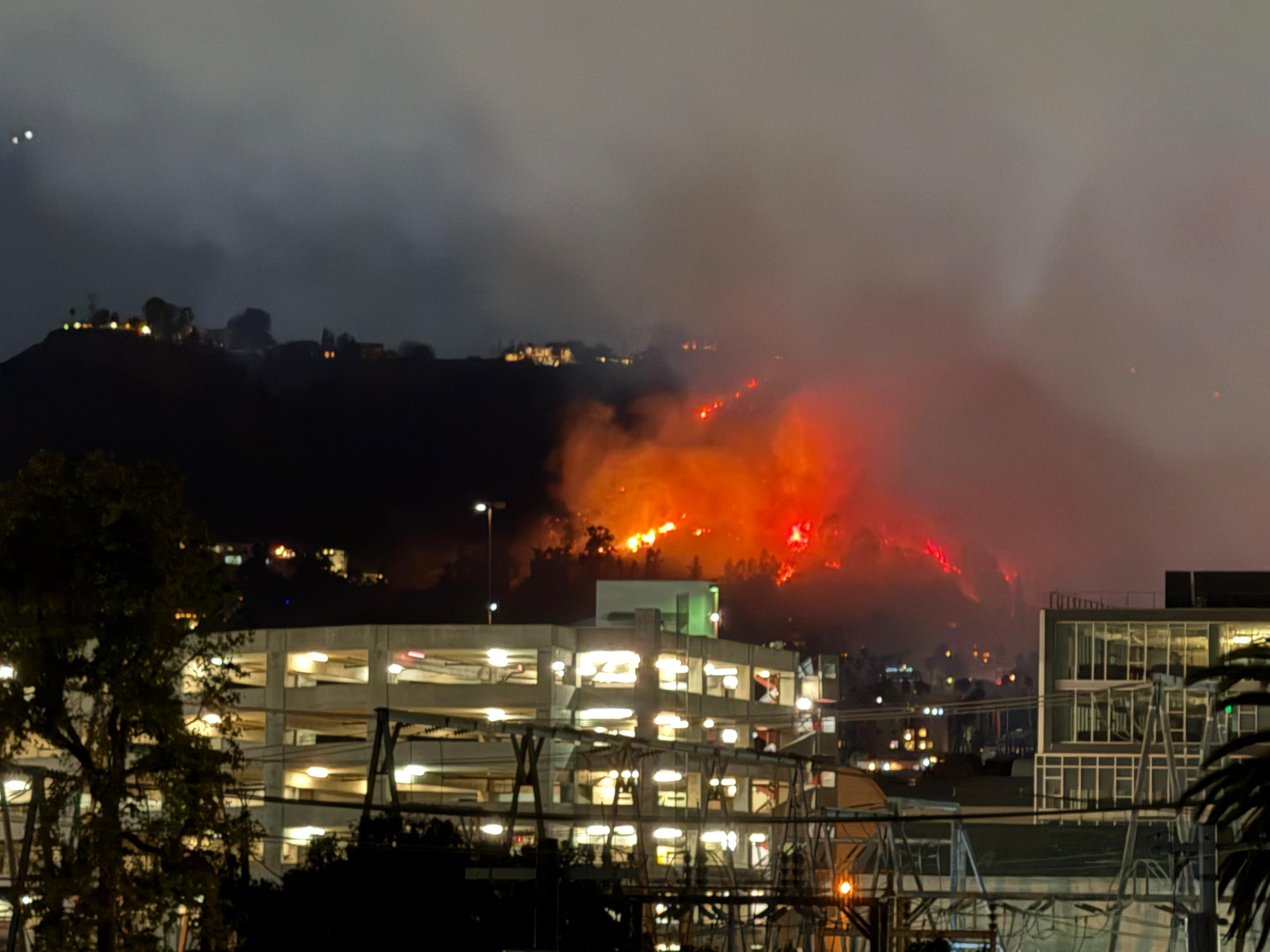
Image of the Los Angeles fires, that killed 30 people

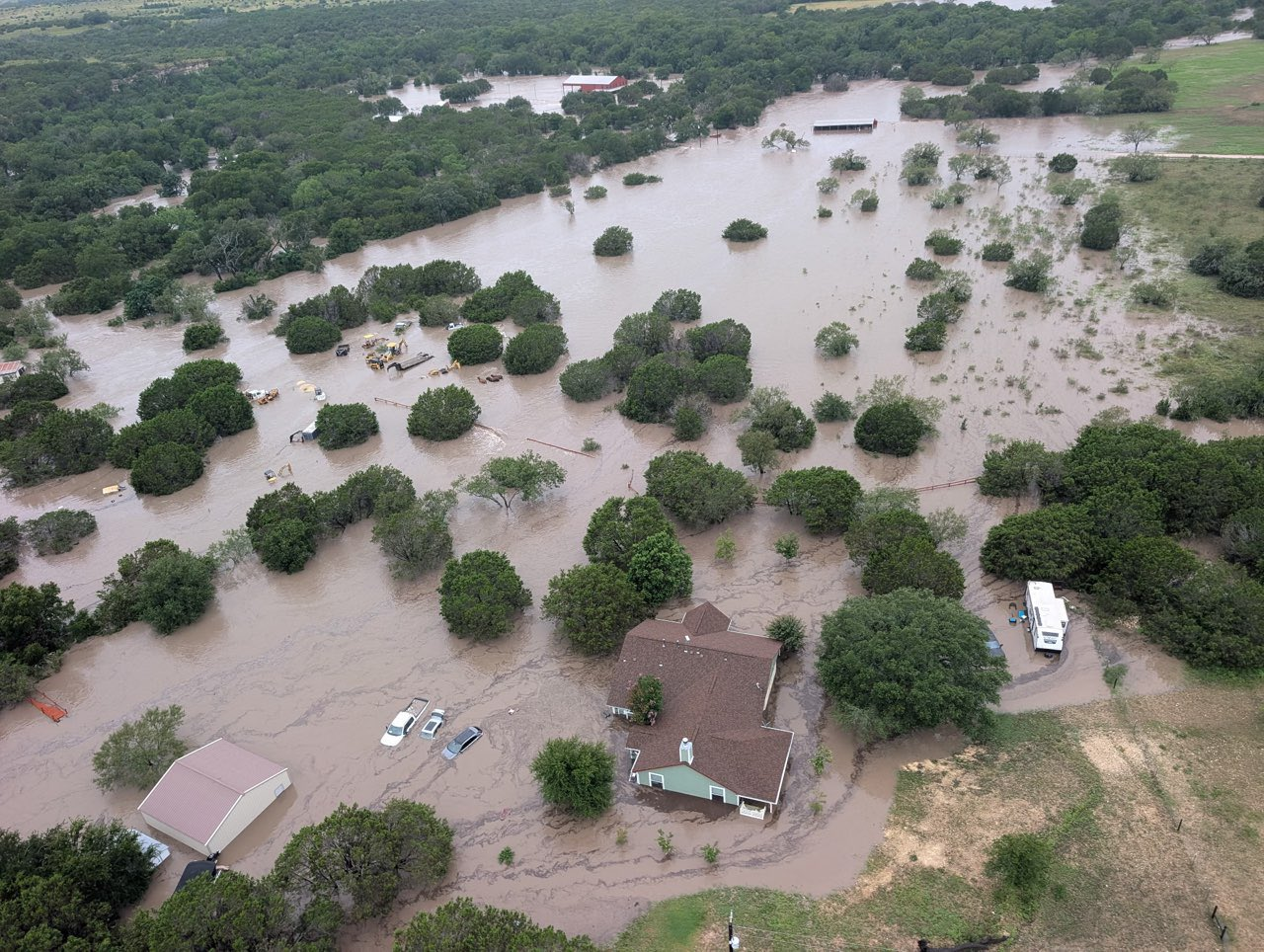
Aerial view of the Texas floods, that killed 135 people

The following is a list of weather events that occurred on Earth in the year 2025. Several weather events which had a significant impact were blizzards, cold waves, droughts, heat waves, wildfires, floods, tornadoes, and tropical cyclones.

== Deadliest events ==
Deadliest meteorological events during 2025
Rank	Event	Date(s)	Deaths	Refs
1	2025 European heatwaves	April – September 2025	14,956-16,500+	
2	Cyclone Senyar	November 25 - November 30	1,500–2,271+	
3	2025 Pakistan floods	June – September 2025	1,037+	
4	Cyclone Ditwah	November 26 - December 4	647	
5	2025 Mokwa flood	May 28–29	≥500	
6	2025 India–Pakistan heat wave	April – July 2025	≥84	
7	2025 Tarasin landslide	August 31	375–1,573	
8	January 2025 Southern California wildfires	January 7–31	31-440	
9	Typhoon Kalmaegi	October 31 – November 7	288	
10	July 2025 Central Texas floods	July 4–7	≥137	

== Types ==
The following listed different types of special weather conditions worldwide.

=== Cold snaps and winter storms ===
In January, an unusual cold snap brought extremely cold temperatures to much of the United States, Canada, and Mexico. It was the coldest January in much of North America in at least 10 years, bringing temperatures as much as 20–35 °F (11.1–19.4 °C) below average to a majority of the United States, starting from the polar vortex pushing down south after the passage of an arctic front on January 2. The lowest temperature was −36 °C (−33 °F) in parts of Saskatchewan, Canada. On January 9–11, a winter storm caused significant impacts in the southern United States, where 2.2 inches (5.6 cm) of snow fell in Dallas, Texas, while 3.5 inches (8.9 cm) of snow fell in Oklahoma City, Oklahoma. In the Southeast, 2.1 inches (5.3 cm) of snow fell in Atlanta, Georgia, while 7 inches (18 cm) of snow fell in Memphis, Tennessee. On January 18–20, a nor'easter brought several inches of snow to many parts of the Northeast, but due to its speed, it limited the extent of snow accumulation. The majority of New Jersey received snow totals of 4–6 inches (10–15 cm), with thundersnow being reported near Essex County. 1.6 inches (4.1 cm) of snow fell in Central Park, New York City, while 8.1 inches (21 cm) of snow fell in Highland Mills, the highest snow total for New York State. On January 20–22, a historic blizzard in the Gulf Coast ensued, where it brought blizzard conditions and heavy snow to areas that usually see little to no snow. States of emergency were issued in Florida and Mississippi to prepare for any potential impact. For the first time in history, a blizzard warning was issued in parts of coastal Louisiana and parts of coastal Texas. Up to 6 inches (15 cm) of snow fell in parts of the Greater Houston area, especially in La Porte, with Beaumont setting an all-time low temperature of 11 °F (−12 °C). In Louisiana, 13.4 inches (34 cm) of snow fell near Grand Coteau, the highest snowfall recorded in the Gulf Coast, 10 inches (25 cm) of snow fell in New Orleans, and 8 inches (20 cm) of snow fell in Baton Rouge. In Baton Rouge, Lafayette, and New Iberia, record low temperatures were set at 7 °F (−14 °C), 4 °F (−16 °C) and 2 °F (−17 °C) respectively. In Mississippi, 9 inches (23 cm) of snow fell in Ocean Springs, and 6.5 inches (17 cm) of snow fell around Gulf Park estates, likely shattering snowfall records. In Alabama, 11 inches (28 cm) of snow fell in Babbie, while 7.5 in (19 cm) of snow fell in Mobile Regional Airport, shattering the record of 6 inches (15 cm) in the latter city. In Florida, 10 inches (25 cm) of snow fell in Milton, while Pensacola saw 8.9 inches (23 cm) of snow, shattering the statewide record for the state. In Georgia and the Carolinas, Cordele, Georgia saw 9 in (23 cm) of snow fell, with a wide area of southwest Georgia seeing 4–6 inches (10–15 cm) of snow. The Atlanta Metro area observed 1 inch (2.5 cm) of snow, with temperatures at 21 °F (−6 °C) in the Atlanta area, 14 °F (−10 °C) in northwest Georgia, and 10 °F (−12 °C) in northeast Georgia. In the Carolinas, 4.5 in (11 cm) of snow fell in North Myrtle Beach, South Carolina, 4 inches (10 cm) of snow fell in Charleston, and 6 inches (15 cm) of snow fell in Cross. In North Carolina, snowfall of about 3–6 inches (7.6–15.2 cm) was reported, with locally higher amounts to 7 inches (18 cm) being reported. 2.6 inches (6.6 cm) of snowfall was reported at Wilmington International Airport.

=== Heat waves and droughts ===
Global average surface temperatures, shown for each January since 1940, reached a record high temperature in January 2025 despite the Earth being in a La Niña (regional cooling) phase.

Scientists in extreme event attribution have concluded that in virtually all countries and territories in the year ending 1 May 2025, human-caused global warming increased the number of days of extreme heat events over long-term norms.

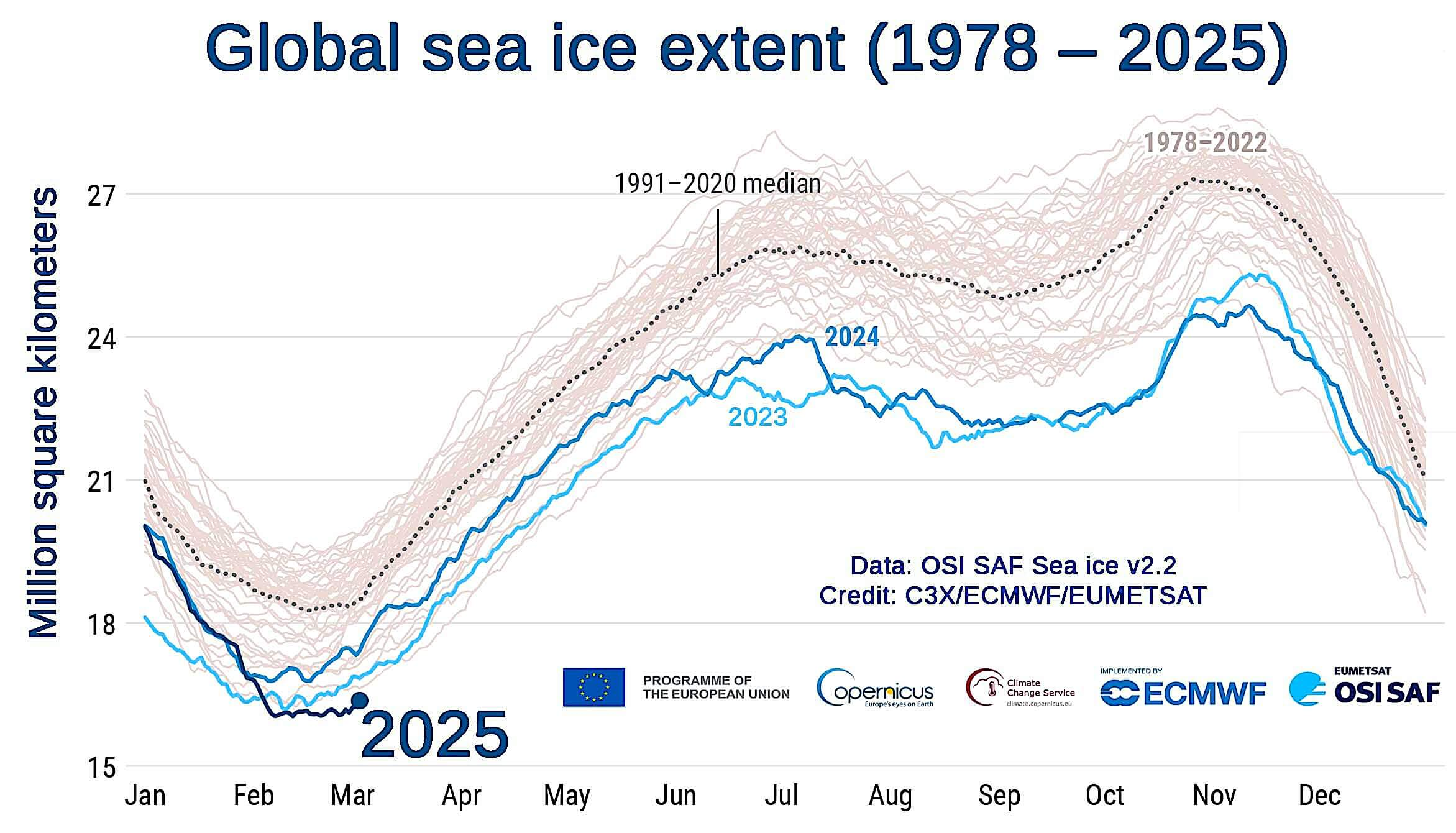
Global sea ice extent, which combines the sea ice extents in both polar regions, reached a new all-time minimum in February 2025.

Nearly all of Florida experienced the worst drought conditions in 24 years, where 84 percent of the state was affected by drought conditions, with a severe rain deficit of 6–10 inches (150–250 mm) since mid-October 2024. At the height of the drought, nearly 99 percent of the state was affected with some form of drought conditions. The Everglades saw its worst drought since 2012, causing airboat rides to shut down due to the lack of water. In mid-May, Texas experienced a powerful early heat wave, with Austin recording a temperature of 101 °F (38 °C) on May 14, breaking its same day record of 97 °F (36 °C). Temperatures ranged between 100–111 °F (38–44 °C), levels considered dangerous for most people.

In June 2025, the National Weather Service issued Alaska's first ever official heat advisory as temperatures reached the mid-80s °F. (about 30 °C). A sudden spike in wildfire activity also occurred in Alaska in late June, with more than 150 wildfires being sparked by lightning. Evacuation orders were issued for many areas of the interior portion of the state. 56,000 acres (23,000 ha) of land were burned in the state within seven days. On July 27, Tampa, Florida reached its all time record high of 100 °F (38 °C), marking the first time the city has seen a triple digit temperature reading.

Summer 2025 was Spain's hottest summer, on average 2.1 °C (3.8 °F) warmer than the 1991-2020 average. One in every three days was under a heatwave, and temperatures exceeded 45 °C (113 °F) at one point. The heat contributed to Spain's worst wildfire season in three decades. Also, summer 2025 was Britain's hottest since records began in 1884.

=== Tornadoes ===
There have been 41 tornadoes rated F3/EF3 or higher, with five of those receiving a rating of EF4 and one receiving an EF5 rating. All of these tornadoes have taken place in the United States. The strongest tornado of the year impacted Enderlin, North Dakota on June 20, at EF5 intensity, with estimated peak winds of 210 miles per hour (340 km/h).

Worldwide, 105 deaths have been confirmed: 68 in the United States, 11 in Vietnam, 7 in Brazil, 4 in China, Spain and Uganda, 2 in the Philippines and 1 in Japan, France, Portugal and Turkey.

The first tornadic fatalities of the year occurred on February 6, when an EF2 tornado impacted mobile homes near Deer Lodge, Tennessee, killing two people and injuring three others.

In the month of March, a major outbreak took place from March 13–16, which was the most active March tornado outbreak on record. It caused 43 fatalities, 23 of which tornadic, and more than 200 injuries. Five of these fatalities occurred during an EF4 tornado that also injured at least nine other people. Total damage from the storm reached $11 billion (2025 USD).

Another major tornado outbreak took place from April 2–7, which resulted in at least 24 fatalities, 9 of which tornadic, and at least 47 injuries. Five of these deaths took place during an EF3 tornado that injured 14 others as well.

In May, two tornado outbreaks occurred, the first one spanning from May 15–16, which spawned a high end EF4 tornado, injuring seven people as it destroyed homes and trees. An EF3 tornado on May 16 tore through the St. Louis area, leaving five people dead, and led to 5,000 buildings seeing some sort of damage. The deadliest tornado since 2021 killed nineteen people throughout Russell, Pulaski, and Laurel counties in Kentucky.

The second one spanning from May 18–21, which an EF3 tornado struck the town of Grinnell, Kansas. Later on the evening of May 18 through the early morning hours of the 19th, a tornado family occurred, where eight tornadoes were spawned by a single supercell, five of which were rated EF3. The first EF3 tornado struck areas near Coldwater, Kansas. A second large EF3 wedge tornado nearly missed the town of Greensburg, which was struck by an EF5 tornado on May 4, 2007. A third large EF3 tornado struck areas near Haviland. A fourth large tornado struck areas near Iuka. A fifth large tornado struck the town of Plevna.

From June 19-22, a major tornado outbreak and derecho caused major damage across the Northern United States, killing seven people and injuring four others. Forty-one tornadoes were confirmed from that outbreak. The most powerful tornado of the outbreak occurred on June 20, when a violent EF5 tornado moved through areas near Enderlin, North Dakota, making it the first EF5 tornado ever recorded worldwide since the 2013 Moore tornado. The rating was given on October 6, based on the violent lofting of several train cars.

On November 7, an F4 tornado struck the city of Rio Bonito do Iguaçu, Paraná, Brazil, killing six people and injuring at least 750. The storm formed as the result of the encounter of an extratropical cyclone and a warm air mass moving in from the north, and produced at least three other tornadoes in the region.

=== Notable tropical and subtropical cyclones ===
Four out of five 2025 Atlantic hurricanes were Category 4 or 5 storms—the highest percentage ever observed in any hurricane season.

Cyclone Dikeledi, a powerful Intense Tropical Cyclone (Category 3-equivalent) that battered Madagascar and Mozambique as a Tropical Cyclone (Category 2 on the SSHWS).

Cyclone Zelia, a powerful Tropical Cyclone that made landfall as Category 5 (Category 4-equivalent). It impacted Western Australia's Pilbara region in mid-February.

Cyclone Garance, which impacted Réunion and Mauritius as an Intense Tropical Cyclone (Category 3-equivalent).

Cyclone Alfred, a powerful, long-lived and erratic Tropical Cyclone that peaked at Category 4 on both scales, and made landfall as Category 1 (Tropical Storm-equivalent) on Moreton Island. It affected South East Queensland and Northern New South Wales.

Cyclone Jude, which affected Madagascar and Mozambique as a Tropical Cyclone (Category 1-equivalent).

In May 2025, the National Oceanic and Atmospheric Administration (NOAA) forecast a 60% chance of an above-normal Atlantic hurricane season, a 30% chance of a near-normal season, and a 10% chance of a below-normal season.

Deep Depression BOB 01, which affected Northeast India and Bangladesh, killing 65.

Tropical Storm Wutip, which impacted China and Vietnam as a Severe Tropical Storm (Category 1-equivalent).

Hurricane Erick, which impacted southern Mexico after peaking as a Category 4 Hurricane.

Tropical Storm Barry, which impacted Mexico's Gulf Coast in June.

Typhoon Danas, which affected Taiwan and China as a typhoon (Category 3-equivalent).

Tropical Storm Chantal, which affected Florida and the Carolinas.

Hurricane Erin, which affected the Lesser Antilles as a category 5 hurricane.

Super Typhoon Ragasa, a super typhoon that affected the Philippines, Hong Kong, and other parts of the southern asian continent.

Typhoon Halong, which reached category 4 strength, affecting Japan, the Aleutians, and Alaska.

Hurricane Melissa, a violent, extremely powerful, and erratic Category 5 Hurricane that made devastating landfalls in Jamaica and Cuba, while also affecting many other areas in the Caribbean Sea, as well as Bermuda and Newfoundland.

Typhoon Kalmaegi, a deadly and powerful Very strong Typhoon (Category 3-equivalent) that devastated areas in the central Philippines, and later made landfall in central Vietnam, killing 288.

Typhoon Fung-wong, an extremely large and powerful Very strong Typhoon (Category 4-equivalent) that caused extensive flooding and extreme wind damage in the northern Philippines after making landfall in Dinalungan, Aurora.

Cyclone Fina, a Cat 4 system that impacted the city of Darwin causing widespread power outages and was the first Cyclone of the 2025-2026 Australian region Cyclone season

Cyclone Senyar, an exceptionally rare tropical cyclone that heavily impacted Thailand and Indonesia, causing over 1500 fatalities, over 7102 injuries, and caused hundreds to go missing throughout the affected regions.

Cyclone Ditwah, which made landfall in Sri Lanka and South India, causing over 647 fatalities, 21 injuries, and hundreds to go missing.

=== Extratropical cyclones and European windstorms ===
Storm Éowyn, a powerful European windstorm that impacted Ireland and the United Kingdom with 135 miles per hour winds.

Storm Emilia, impacted south-western Europe, the Canary Islands and Morocco, resulting in at least 37 fatalities due to flash flooding in the Moroccan city of Safi.

=== Wildfires ===
The January 2025 Southern California wildfires were a series of wildfires in California, mostly around the Los Angeles area, that caused at least 30 deaths and destroyed or damaged at least 17,000 structures. In March, Texas and Oklahoma saw multiple wildfires break out, with hurricane-force wind gusts reaching as high as 85 mph (137 km/h), combined with humidity levels as low as 10%. Major wildfires include the Windmill Fire, which burned 23,287 acres in Texas, the 840 Road Fire, which burned 27,866 acres in Oklahoma and led to a fire warning being issued near Leedey, and the Stillwater Fire, which burned 7,639 acres, and led to the destruction of 202 homes in Stillwater, Oklahoma. In Northern Minnesota, wildfires that spread from record heat, "unprecedented" weather conditions, and dead trees infested by the eastern spruce budworm. The fires destroyed about 150 structures.

== Timeline ==
This is a timeline of weather events during 2025.

=== January ===
- December 30, 2024 – January 17, 2025 – Cyclone Dikeledi struck Madagascar and Mozambique, killing 9.
- January 7–31 – The Southern California wildfires cause 30 deaths, with the Eaton Fire burning 14,021 acres (5,674 ha), while the Palisades Fire burned 23,448 acres (9,489 ha), being the second and third most destructive wildfires in California history, respectively.
- January 9–11 – A winter storm in the southern United States caused snow to fall across the Southeast, with 2.1 in (5.3 cm) of snow recorded in Atlanta, Georgia, the biggest snowstorm in several years.
- January 20–22 – A historic winter storm hit the Gulf Coast of the United States, with Louisiana and Florida breaking their largest single-day snowfall, at 13.4 in (34 cm) in Grand Coteau and 10 in (25 cm) in Milton.

=== February ===
- February 15–16 – A storm system brought flash flooding and tornadoes that impacted parts of the United States, leaving at least 18 people dead. The flash flooding occurred in Kentucky, West Virginia, Tennessee, and Virginia.

=== March ===
- March 13–16 – The deadliest tornado outbreak since 2021, also the largest outbreak in March and the costliest tornado outbreak on record, took place across the United States.
- March 26–27 – According to the Japan Meteorological Agency, a record high of 30.3 °C (86.5 °F) was measured in Saiki and Takanabe, and 30.2 °C (86.4 °F) in Saito, all located in eastern Kyushu, the first time that a temperature over 30 °C (86 °F) was recorded in March outside the Ryukyu and Bonin Islands. Temperatures of 25–29 °C (77–84 °F) were also recorded in many places in Honshu.

=== April ===
- April 2–7 – A slow-moving weather system and a stationary front caused both a widespread and devastating tornado outbreak and historic, life-threatening flash flooding across much of the Southern and Midwestern United States.

=== May ===
- May 13–20 – Heavy rain storms brought extensive flooding to Western Maryland and Pennsylvania; schools were evacuated and some boroughs initiated states of emergencies.
- May 16 – An EF4 tornado kills 20 people in Laurel County, Kentucky.
  - A strong tornado in the St. Louis metropolitan area inflicts heavy damage to property and kills four people.
- The Copernicus Climate Change Service reported that May 2025 was the second warmest May globally, 0.12 °C (0.22 °F) cooler than the record May 2024 and 1.40 °C (2.52 °F) above the 1850–1900 average defining the pre-industrial level. The reading for May 2025 interrupted a streak of 21 months with a global average temperature more than 1.5 °C (2.7 °F) above the pre-industrial level.

=== June ===
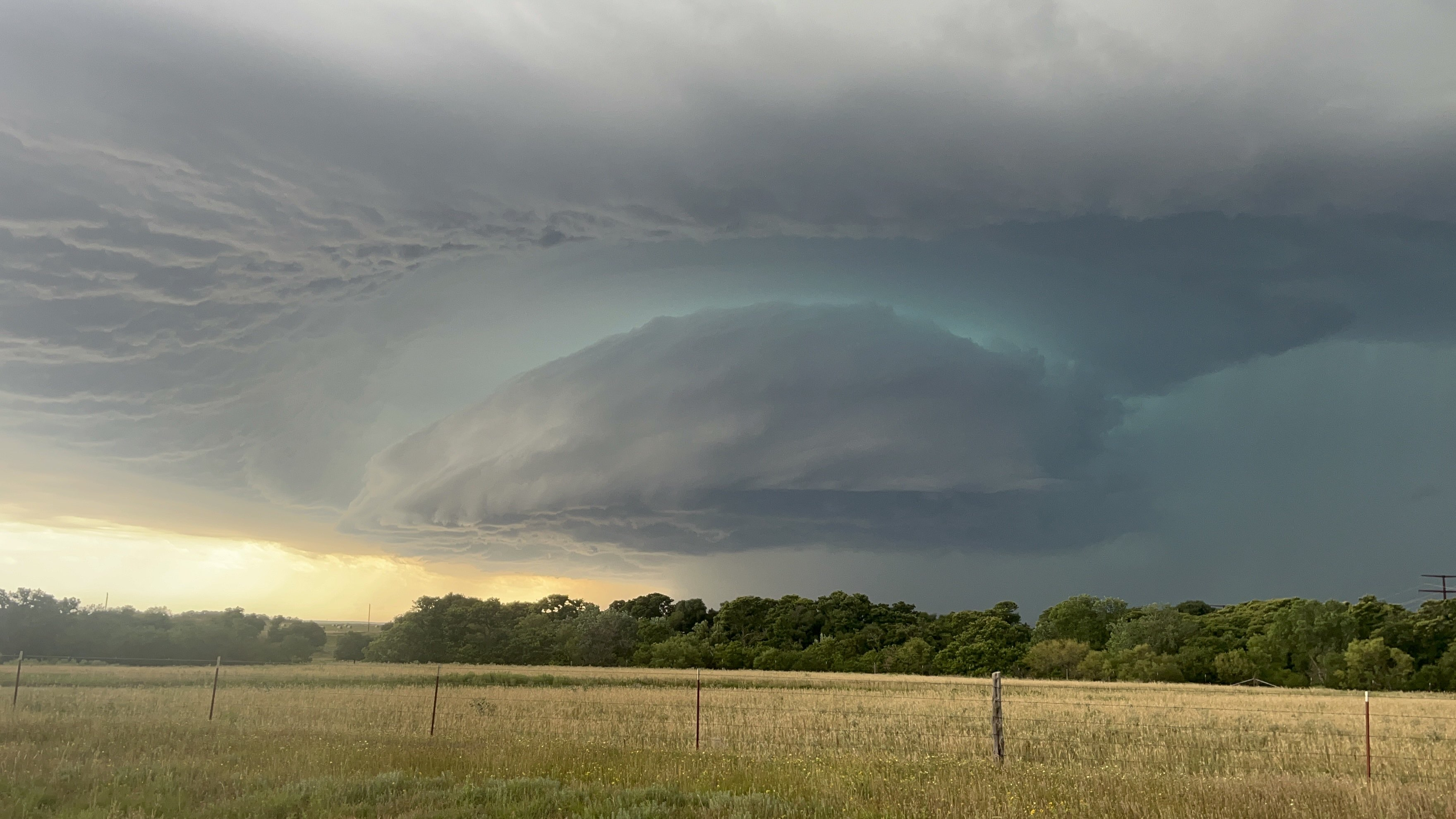
Supercell in that crossed over Paducah, Texas on June 8.

- June 15 – Several records are broken for the coldest high temperature on the Father's Day holiday. For example, New York City saw a high of 64 °F (18 °C), Philadelphia saw 65 °F (18 °C), and Trenton, New Jersey saw 61 °F (16 °C).
- June 20 – An EF5 tornado, the first in over twelve years worldwide, moved through areas near Enderlin, North Dakota.
- June 22–25 – An unusually strong ridge of high pressure occurred over the central and eastern United States impacting millions of people with the temperatures breaking records. On June 24, Augusta, Maine set their all time high temperature record of 100 °F (38 °C), with Plattsburgh, New York tying their all time high temperature record on June 23 at 101 °F (38 °C). Several cities along the Great Lakes also set records for all-time warmest low temperatures, and many monthly records were set, including as far as Cheyenne, Wyoming.

=== July ===
- July 4–7 – Deadly and destructive flooding occurs the Hill Country region of Texas, primarily along the Guadalupe River, which rose rapidly, killing at least 135 people.
- July 4–8 – Tropical Storm Chantal made landfall in the Mid-Atlantic, Southeastern United States on July 5.
- July 14 – Flash floods result in New York City having its second wettest hour on record; elsewhere, two people are killed due to flooding in Plainfield, New Jersey.
- July 31 – Torrential downpours lead to flash flooding across the Northeastern United States, and one person died due to flooding in Maryland. Additionally, over 100 people required rescue out of a Long Island Rail Road train car in Bayside, New York due to floodwaters.

=== August ===
- August 5 – At least five are killed and at least 50 are left missing (as of 7 August) by the 2025 Uttarakhand flash flood in Uttarkashi, Uttarakhand, India.
- August 8 – Severe thunderstorms formed across western North Dakota and eastern Montana, causing the first tornado in the history of Grand Forks, North Dakota. Wind speeds up to 146 km/h (91 mph) winds were recorded. The tornado was rated EF1 on the Fujita Scale, causing minor damage. The storm also had river flood warnings issued for parts of Minnesota.
- August 9–10 – Severe flash floods occurred in the Milwaukee metro area since 2010 resulted in power outages, overflowing basements, and the cancellations of a Lynyrd Skynyrd concert and the final day of the 2025 Wisconsin State Fair.

=== September ===
- September 25 – October 16 – A series of floods in northern Vietnam and the North Central Coast causes at least 85 casualties.

=== October ===
- October 4–13 – Typhoon Halong, which reached category 4 strength, tracked east from the Japanese coast and then across the Aleutians into the Bering Sea, impacting coastal Alaska.
- October 5 – Burlington, Vermont ties its warmest October temperature on record at 86 °F (30 °C).
- October 12–13 – A deadly nor'easter causes 3 fatalities and over 40,000 power outages along the East Coast of the United States.
- October 21–31 – Hurricane Melissa impacts Jamaica at Category 5 strength, with 1-minute-sustained-winds of 185 mph (298 km/h) at landfall, tying it as the 2nd highest at landfall for any Atlantic hurricane. Hurricane Melissa also had the third-lowest pressure of any Atlantic hurricane ever recorded, as well as having been the most intense Atlantic hurricane at landfall on record, both records being tied with the 1935 Labor Day Hurricane.
- October 30 – Another nor'easter hits the Northeastern United States, causing 2 deaths and record rainfall in New York City.

=== November ===
- October 31 – November 7 – Typhoon Kalmaegi devastates portions of the central Philippines and later struck Vietnam as one of the strongest storms ever recorded in the area. This storm killed over 288 people, left hundreds injured, and caused many individuals to go missing.
- November 7 – An F4 tornado strikes the Brazilian city of Rio Bonito do Iguaçu, destroying most of the city and leaving six dead and hundreds injured.
- November 4–12 – Typhoon Fung-wong, an extraordinarily large typhoon, makes landfall and causes extreme flooding and damage in the northern Philippines. This landfall, only five days after Typhoon Kalmaegi's devastating impacts occurred, disrupted recovery efforts.
- November 14–26 – Cyclone Fina makes several landfalls, first on the Coburg Peninsula, then on Melville Island, and finally made its last landfall in the Kimberley region.
- November 25–30 – Cyclone Senyar forms in the Strait of Malacca, the second to ever be documented in that strait since reliable records began, and makes two landfalls in Indonesia. This storm brought heavy floods and created deadly landslides in Thailand, Malaysia, and Indonesia, causing $19.8 billion (2025 USD) in damages, killing over 1,500 people, injuring over 7,102, and caused hundreds more to go missing.
- November 26 – December 4 – Cyclone Ditwah affected India and Sri Lanka. 647 people were killed, over 21 were injured and 183 people were reported as missing.

=== December ===
- December 13–15 – A winter storm hit the Midwestern, Mid-Atlantic and Southeastern regions of the United States on December 13–14.
- December 17-20 - A winter storm hit the Midwest, dumping snow and ice from Minnesota and into the Great Lakes.
- December 26–27 – A winter storm hit New York with 8–10 inches (20–25 cm) of ice and snow. Interstate 95, and Interstate 87 was closed because of car accidents, and John F. Kennedy International Airport was delayed because of snow and ice.

== See also ==
- Weather of 2026
- Weather of 2024
- Weather of 2023
- Weather of 2022
- Weather of 2021

Global weather by year
Preceded by 2024	Weather of 2025	Succeeded by 2026
