= Milwaukee Metropolitan Sewerage District =

Government agency in Milwaukee

Sewage treatment overview
- Formed: 1982
- Jurisdiction: Milwaukee, Ozaukee, Racine, Washington and Waukesha counties
- Headquarters: 260 W. Seeboth Street Milwaukee, Wisconsin
- Website: mmsd.com

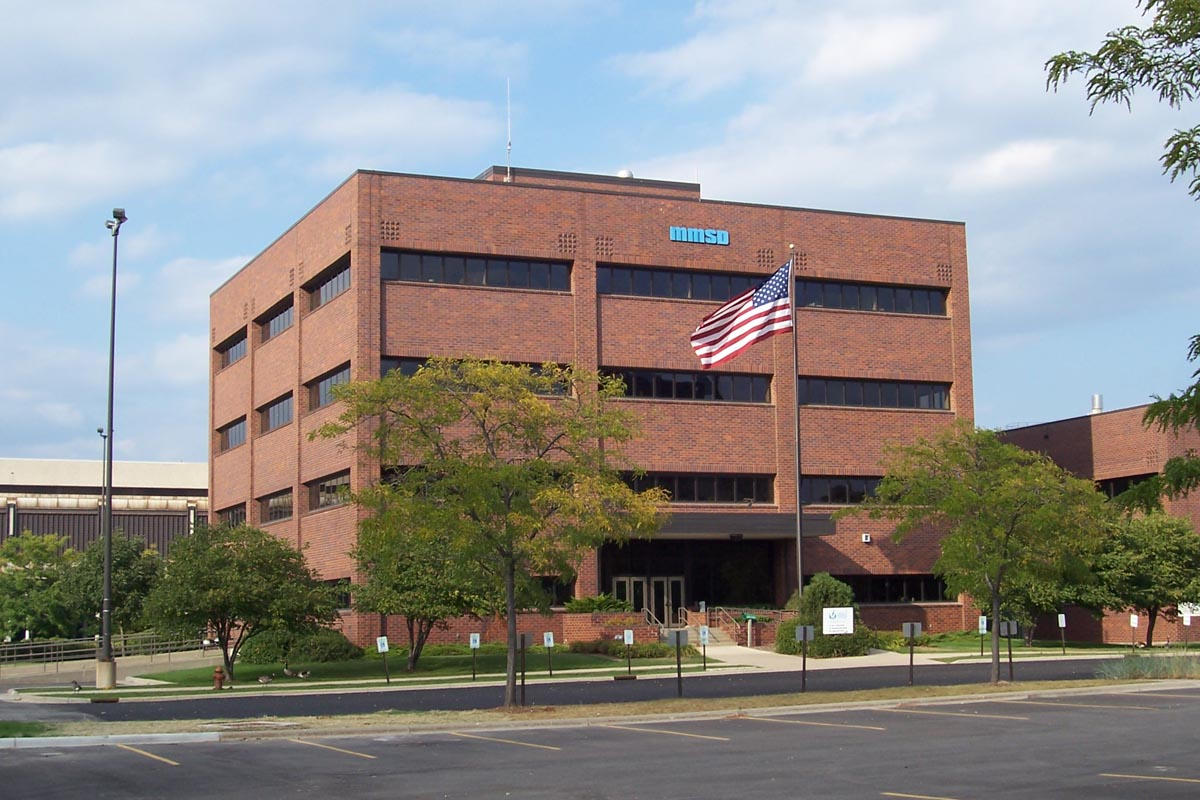
Main Headquarters

The Milwaukee Metropolitan Sewerage District (MMSD) is a regional government agency that provides water reclamation and flood management services for about 1.1 million people in 28 communities in the Greater Milwaukee Area. A recipient of the U.S. Water Prize and many other awards, the District has a record of 98.4 percent, since 1994, for capturing and cleaning wastewater from 28 communities in a 411-square-mile (1,060 km^{2}) area. The national goal is 85 percent of all the rain and wastewater that enters their sewer systems.

With headquarters and a central laboratory along the Menomonee River near downtown Milwaukee, it has two wastewater treatment plants: the Jones Island Water Reclamation Facility, which is located at Jones Island (43°01′23.5″N 87°53′58″W) in Milwaukee, and a second facility at the South Shore (42°53′16″N 87°50′44″W) in Oak Creek. These facilities were operated by United Water under a 10-year agreement ending March 1, 2008. Veolia Water is the current operator.

"The world’s first large scale wastewater treatment plant was constructed on Jones Island, near the shore of Lake Michigan." The primary wastewater treatment plant at Jones Island was one of the first of its kind when the original activated sludge plant was constructed in 1925. MMSD was the first to market biosolids created through this process as a fertilizer under the name "Milorganite." The Jones Island Plant was among the first sewage treatment plants in the United States to succeed in using the activated sludge treatment process. "It was the first treatment facility to economically dispose of the recovered sludge by producing an organic fertilizer." In the early 1980s the plant needed extensive reworking, "this does not detract from its historic significance as a pioneering facility in the field of pollution control technology." It had the largest capacity of any plant in the world when constructed. Its present treatment capacity is 390 million gallons per day, but average flow was only 105 million gallons per day between 2015 and 2019. The 1925 plant has been designated as a National Historic Civil Engineering Landmark by the American Society of Civil Engineers. MMSD has maintained an inline storage system (ISS) based on tunnels to store and convey wet weather flows, including combined sewage, since 1994. The ISS tunnels have a total capacity of 400 million US gallons (1.5×10^{9} L) and a combined length of over 20 miles (32 km). Since 1994, the ISS tunnels have prevented more than 37 billion US gallons (1.4×10^{11} L) of combined sewer overflows (CSOs) and sanitary sewer overflows (SSOs) from entering area waterways, including Lake Michigan. Between 1994 and 2000, CSOs decreased from 40 to 60 events per year to an average of 2.5 events per year (WDNR 2001).

== MMSD Initiatives ==
=== Flood Management ===
Flooding and erosion of the watersheds in the greater Milwaukee area threaten public health and private property. Watersheds boundaries do not necessarily follow municipal boundaries, reducing the risk of flooding requires looking at the watershed as a whole, including the complete river system and its tributaries. The Milwaukee Metropolitan Sewerage District has discretionary authority to maintain the watersheds in the Greater Milwaukee Area and authority to reduce the risk of flooding is in Wisconsin Statutes, Section 200.31(1). In the past, work has included: rehabilitation and removal of concrete, removal of sediment and flow-impeding objects, and widening floodplains for flood management purposes.

=== Fresh Coast Guardians Resource Center - Green Infrastructure ===
The Fresh Coast Resource Center (FCRC) helps southeastern Wisconsin improve the health of Lake Michigan through smart use of green infrastructure. The FCRC assists the community by providing the inspiration, education, and tools needed to create successful green infrastructure projects.

In 2017, MMSD opened the FCRC to empower people, homeowners, businesses, nonprofits, and government to take an active role in protecting the most precious natural resource: water. By helping the community to protect area rivers and Lake Michigan, MMSD works to achieve its goal of capturing the first 0.5 inches (13 mm) of rainfall in its service area. By capturing the first 0.5 inches (13 mm) of rain, 740 million US gallons (2.8×10^{9} L) of water will stay out of sewers, helping to prevent sewer overflows and reducing runoff pollution.

== Combined Sewer Overflows ==
Diverting combined sewer overflows (CSOs) to waterways is an emergency measure to prevent sewage backups into basements when wastewater treatment facilities reach capacity. MMSD follows the 2014 State of Wisconsin Department of Natural Resources Discharge Permit for sewer overflows. CSOs are sewers that are designed to collect rainwater runoff, domestic sewage, and industrial wastewater in the same pipe. When a CSO happens, they post it on their website and have 5 days to report it to the DNR. According to scientists at the UW-Milwaukee School of Freshwater Sciences, bacteria from CSO's only survive for up to 10 days due to the frigid temperatures of Lake Michigan. Combined sewer overflows are 90 to 95 percent stormwater and groundwater.

MMSD's CSOs are smaller than those of other cities on the Great Lakes, including Cleveland's and Detroit's, and are similar to those of the smaller city of Grand Rapids. Year-to-year CSOs vary depending on local rainfall but as a recent example in 2014 MMSD CSOs totaled 342 million US gallons (1.29×10^{9} L), meaning that 99.5 percent of the total flow through the municipal sewer system was treated. MMSD’s permit requires that CSOs be limited to no more than six overflows per year, consistent with the presumption approach in the CSO Control Policy.

Separating the sanitary and storm sewers would decrease the amount of water captured and treated; however, the amount of pollutants going into area rivers and Lake Michigan would increase. In urban areas with many impervious surfaces (buildings, parking lots, and streets), there is little opportunity for stormwater to be absorbed into green areas. Resulting in run off with a high degree of pollutants that would further erode water quality.

=== Deep Tunnel ===
David Biello of Scientific American writes, "Since 1994, a more than 26-mile- (42-kilometer-) long tunnel has been keeping Milwaukee's sewage from spilling into Lake Michigan. This deep water tunnel—a holding tank on steroids—comprises two legs roughly 300 feet (90 meters) below ground that can hold nearly 500 million gallons (1.9 billion liters) of sewage and storm water during a downpour. And for the last 14 years it has kept 74 billion gallons (280 billion liters) of wastewater out of Lake Michigan, according to Bill Graffin, a spokesman for the Milwaukee Metropolitan Sewerage District."

The Deep Tunnel has prevented more than 125 billion US gallons (4.7×10^{11} L) of pollution from getting into Lake Michigan. Thanks to the tunnel and many other improvements, MMSD has captured and cleaned 98.4 percent of all the stormwater and wastewater that's entered the regional sewer system since 1994. The goal nationally is to capture and clean 85 percent for the more than 700 cities with systems like Milwaukee's.

== See also ==
- 2010 Milwaukee flood
