= Jones Island, Milwaukee =

Human settlement in Milwaukee, Wisconsin, United States of America

Coordinates: 43.017900°N 87.898600°W

Memorial plaque at Kaszube's Park.

Jones Island is an industrialized peninsula in Milwaukee, Wisconsin. It began as a marsh island between the Milwaukee and Kinnickinnic rivers, and now forms the city's inner harbor design.

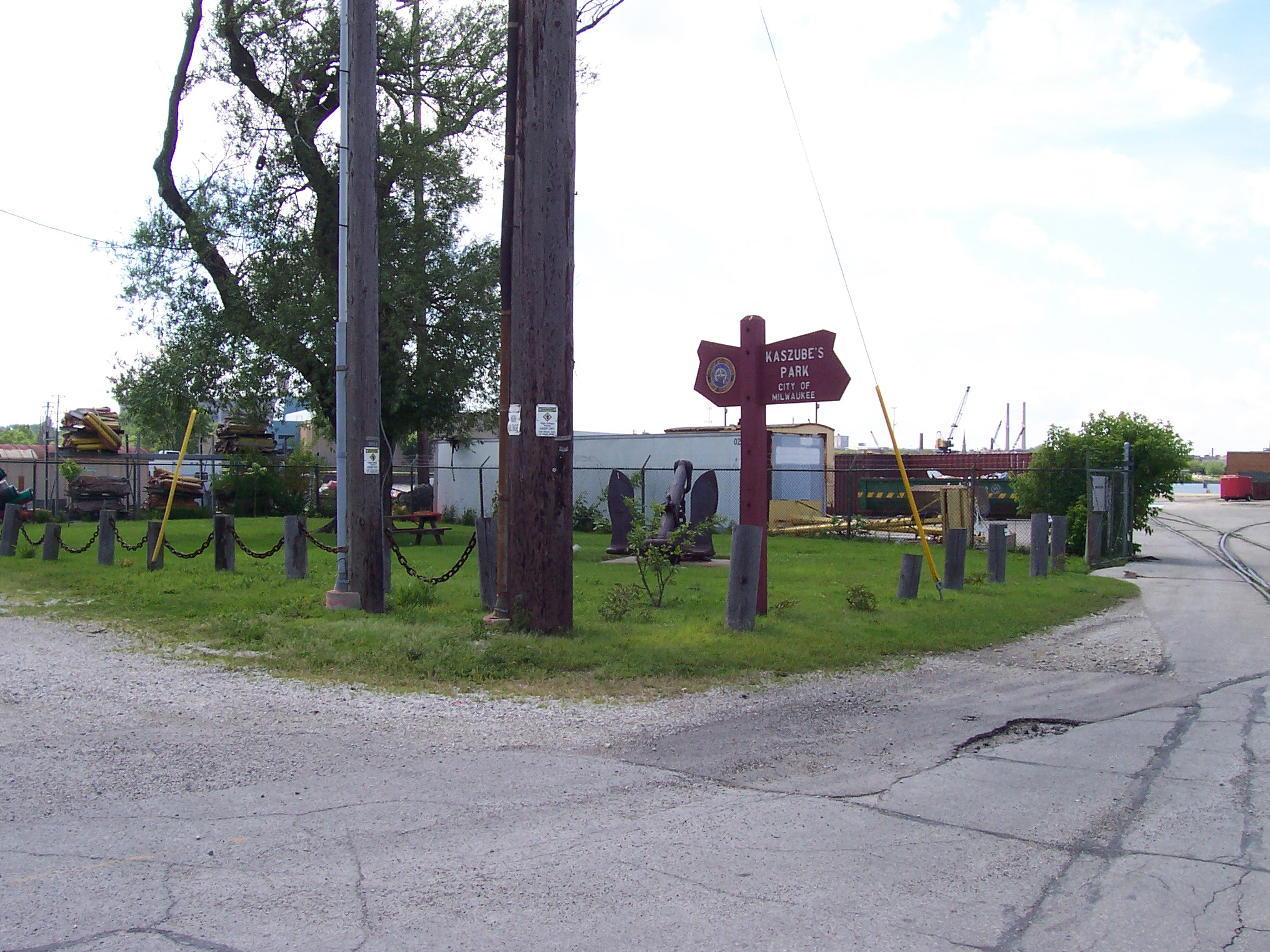
View of Kaszube's Park from the street

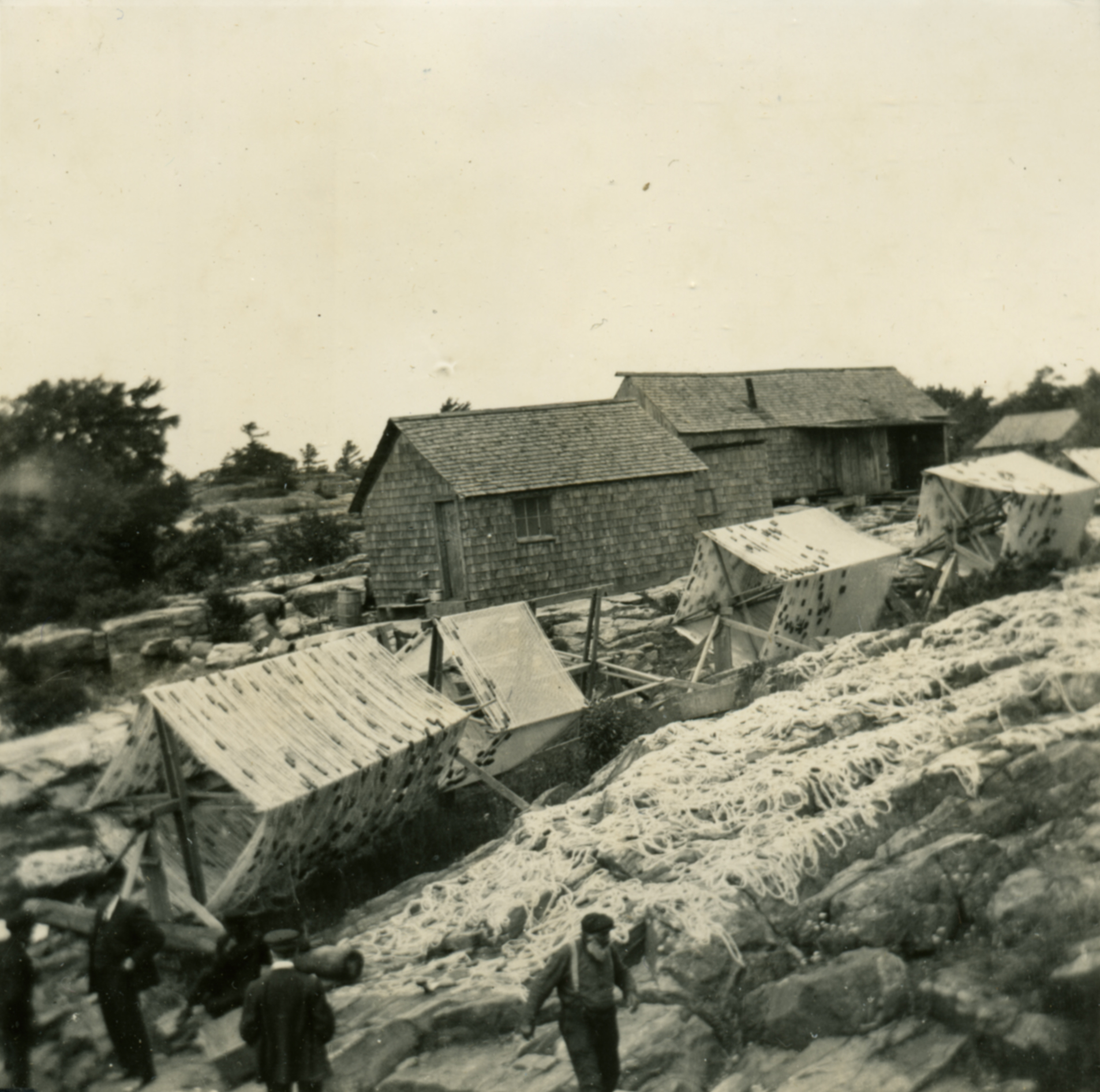
Fishing Gear on Jones Island, 1912

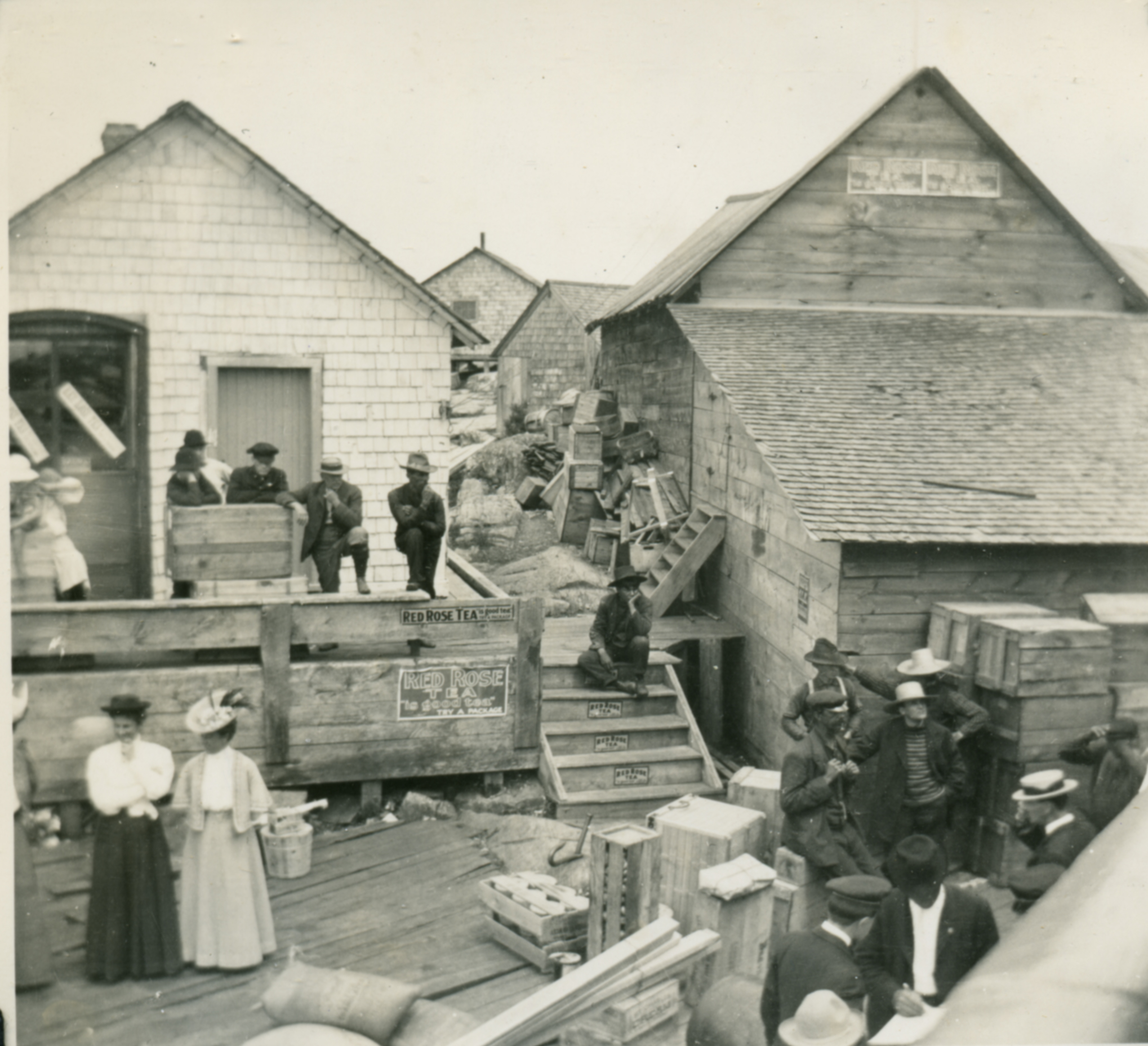
Jones Island Docks; the 2 women were school teachers waiting for the boat back to mainland Milwaukee, 1912

== History ==
Extensive filling and channelization of the area began in the mid-19th century when city co-founder Byron Kilbourn advocated a "straight cut" from the Milwaukee River near the Menomonee River confluence out to Lake Michigan. This channel was made in 1857 and is still in use today. The resulting "island" became known as Jones Island after Captain James Monroe Jones, who had opened a shipyard on the peninsula in 1854. Prior to that, the natural outlet for all three rivers was at the southern end of Jones Island where the Kinnickinnic now turns north to flow out of the straight cut. This area was later filled.

It was initially settled by Kashubian and German immigrants in the 1870s, who made their living by fishing Lake Michigan. Having never officially obtained a deed for the land, they were considered squatters by the City of Milwaukee. The area was condemned in 1914, and the vast majority of them were evicted in the 1920s to make way for a shipping port as part of an inner harbor design. Residents of Jones Island received compensation from the City for their homes and other property despite their lack of formal land ownership. The last resident, a saloonkeeper, was evicted in 1943.

Currently Jones Island is home to the Port of Milwaukee, the Milwaukee Metropolitan Sewerage District's primary wastewater treatment plant, the Jones Island Water Reclamation Facility, and other municipal services. It also supports the Hoan Bridge, a long span bridge. The land is heavily industrialized and only contains a couple of mature trees.

== Notable people ==
- George L. Tews, machinist, businessman, and three-time Socialist member of the Wisconsin State Assembly

== See also ==
- Neighborhoods of Milwaukee
- Parks of Milwaukee
