= Milorganite =

Brand of biosolids fertilizer produced by treating sewage sludge

- Product type: Biosolids fertilizer
- Current owner: Milwaukee Metropolitan Sewerage District
- Introduced: 1926
- Markets: United States
- Registered as a trademark in: U.S. Trademark 76,536,671
- Website: milorganite.com

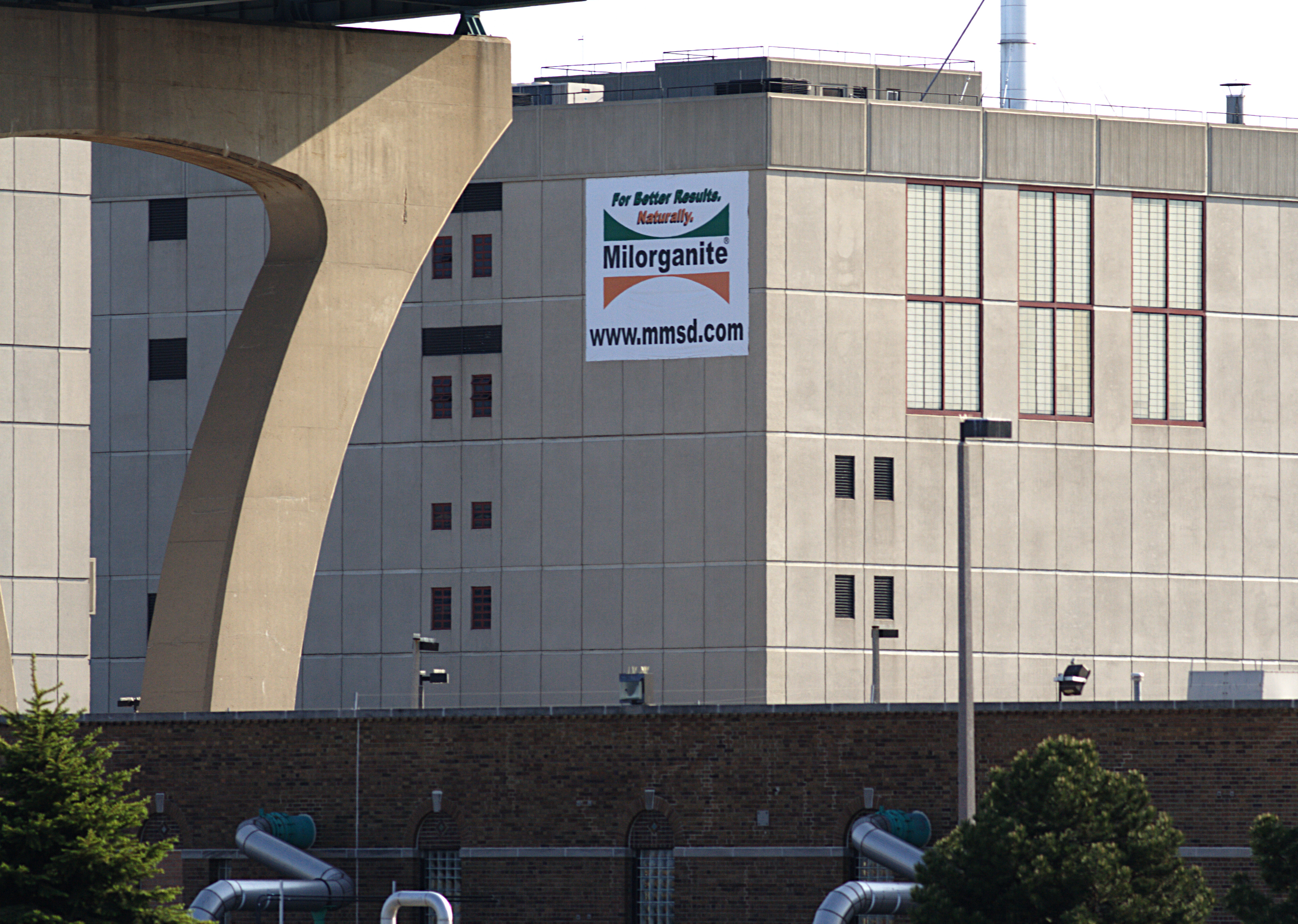
Milorganite building

Milorganite is a brand of biosolids fertilizer produced by treating sewage sludge by the Milwaukee Metropolitan Sewerage District. The term is a portmanteau of the term Milwaukee Organic Nitrogen. The sewer system of the District collects municipal wastewater from the Milwaukee metropolitan area. After settling, wastewater is treated with microbes to break down organic matter at the Jones Island Water Reclamation Facility in Milwaukee, Wisconsin. The byproduct sewage sludge is produced. This is heat-dried with hot air in the range of 900–1,200 °F (482–649 °C), which heats the sewage sludge to at least 176 °F (80 °C) to kill pathogens. The material is then pelletized and marketed throughout the United States under the name Milorganite. The result is recycling of the nitrogen and phosphorus from the waste-stream as fertilizer. The treated wastewater is discharged to Lake Michigan.

The Milwaukee Metropolitan Sewerage District has registered Milorganite as a trademark.

== History ==
"Milorganite" is a portmanteau of the term Milwaukee Organic Nitrogen. It was the winning entry in a 1925 naming contest for a biosolids-based fertilizer held in National Fertilizer Magazine. Its history began with Milwaukee's goal to clean up its rivers and Lake Michigan. Rather than land filling solids left over from wastewater treatment, the sludge was used in a pioneering effort to make, distribute and sell fertilizer.

As of May 2019, 9.9 billion pounds (4.5 megatonnes) of waste have been diverted away from landfills. The resulting production is among the largest recycling programs in the world.

Milorganite's roots began in 1911, when local "sewer socialist" politicians were elected on a platform calling for construction of a wastewater treatment plant to protect against water borne pathogens. As raising taxes for public health was relatively controversial in the early 1900s, producing an organic fertilizer as a means of partially offsetting its operating cost was proposed. With the help of researchers in the College of Agriculture at the University of Wisconsin, the use of waste solids in the form of activated sludge as a source of fertilizer had been developed in the early 20th century. Experiments showed that heat-dried activated sludge pellets "compared favorably with standard organic materials such as dried blood, tankage, fish scrap, and cottonseed meal".

The Milwaukee Metropolitan Sewerage District's Jones Island Plant had the largest wastewater treatment capacity of any in the world when constructed in 1925. It was the first plant in the United States to succeed in using the activated sludge treatment process to produce fertilizer. The Plant has been designated as a Historic Civil Engineering Landmark by the American Society of Civil Engineers.

In 1926, Milorganite made its debut as the first pelletized fertilizer in the United States, with sales directed at golf courses, turf farms, and flower growers. The brand was popularized during the 1930s and 1940s before inorganic urea became available to homeowners after WWII.

Oyvind Juul (O.J.) Noer helped establish the turfgrass industry, and "was instrumental in the success of Milorganite". While promoting Milorganite, his influence got him designated as “Mr. Turf” by the Golf Course Superintendents Association of America. He was an important lecturer and authored proponent of turfgrass and fertilizer, including a series of articles titled The ABC of Turf Culture — later published as one of the earliest comprehensive books on the subject of turf maintenance. Noer achieved this stature from his willingness to share his extensive knowledge of turfgrass. While working for Milorganite, he visited more than 80 percent of U.S. golf courses, to aid greenskeepers diagnose and cure "turf problems based on research-based knowledge". In 1985, he was inducted into the Wisconsin Golf Hall of Fame.

Since its inception, over four million metric tons of Milorganite have been sold. As of 2018, the plant produces in the range of 45,000–49,000 short tons (41,000–44,000 tonnes) of Milorganite per year, which is roughly 2.4 million bags. The sale of product does not generate sufficient funds to cover the costs of manufacture, but the Milwaukee Metropolitan Sewerage District states that the environmental benefits are a legitimate offsetting consideration:

In addition to the conflicting financial and environmental goals, it has to cope with fluctuations and vagaries of a changing waste stream. For example, there has been a substantial impact upon both the quality and the quantity of raw material available as a result of Milwaukee losing much of its malting and brewing industry through the departure of once-giant local concerns Schlitz Brewing Company and Pabst Brewing Company. Milorganite has been at the forefront of the sewage sludge recycling industry in the U.S. Changes in the economy and the resultant sewage to be treated have had an impact on Milorganite production.

The process is the end point of the regional sewerage system, which includes "three thousand miles of household laterals and another 3,000 miles of sanitary sewers" (5,000 km of laterals and 5,000 km of sewers). Also included is the 28.5 miles (45.9 km) "deep tunnel project", which provides 521 million U.S. gallons (1.97 billion liters; 1.97 million cubic meters; 434 million imperial gallons) of overflow storage system. Two plants, one on Jones Island and the other in Oak Creek, process sewage using bacteria. Methane is recaptured and used to minimize energy costs.

== Product ==
Heat-dried biosolids contain slow release organic nitrogen and largely water-insoluble phosphorus bound with iron and aluminum and high organic matter.

Milorganite can be used without restriction on gardens growing food crops intended for human consumption under United States Environmental Protection Agency (EPA) rules. The product is tested daily for the presence of heavy metals and weekly for waterborne pathogens. It complies with the EPA "Exceptional Quality" criteria, which establishes the strictest concentration limits in the fertilizer industry for heavy metals, allowing Milorganite to be used on food crops. Milorganite has been tested for the presence of contaminants such as waste pharmaceuticals and other forms of drug pollution.

According to its material safety data sheet Milorganite is "registered for sale in all 50 states and meets all federal and state requirements." The United States Department of Agriculture (USDA) certifies it as biobased because it is derived from 85% renewable materials. It is not, however, certified for use on USDA organic farms.

Suggestions that Milorganite deters deer have been substantiated, but the reputed costs (Note: Studies paid for by the water district at the University of Georgia and Cornell showed it to be effective in deterring deer. However, the projected cost of EPA certification was estimated at between $1 and $2 million, equivalent to half the organization's entire annual $2 to $3 million advertising and public contract budget.) of having it certified as a repellent are greater than its potential return. The Environmental Protection Agency denied the application to permit its use as a deer repellent because of a lack of supporting studies showing its environmental impact.

"Milorganite Weed and Feed", a combination of Milorganite with 2,4-D, in a partnership with Parker Fertilizer, was considered in 1971. Seeking to associate itself with the "ecology kick", Milorganite's marketing staff considered the implications of "Milorganite-cide blends". Critics said that the invention of such a product was a repudiation of the sewage district's history. The concept was eventually rejected, and was never marketed to the public. Claims that Milorganite itself was a "natural, organic and/or safe" product were identified as a concern in 1992, when the Federal Trade Commission began an investigation saying the claim was deceptive. By 2000, the United States Department of Agriculture banned the application of all biosolids to any crops bearing the label "organic".

== Environmental concerns ==
The EPA has shown that biosolids can contain measurable levels of synthetic organic compounds, radionuclides, and heavy metals. USEPA has set numeric limits for arsenic, cadmium, copper, lead, mercury, molybdenum, nickel, selenium, and zinc.

The presence of heavy metals is a source of concern. The facility reports that they have been substantially reduced over the years. Milorganite contains metals at levels found safe by EPA when Milorganite is used as directed.

The EPA has not regulated levels of environmentally toxic manmade dioxins. Polybrominated diphenyl ethers, a type of "persistent, bioaccumulative and toxic" (PBT) contaminant, were detected in biosolids in 2001. PCBS are occasionally detected despite production being banned since the 1970s. In 2007, unusually high levels of toxic polychlorinated biphenyls (PCBs) were detected in Milorganite that was donated to the City of Milwaukee and Milwaukee County and subsequently applied on parkland. The cost to the Milwaukee Metropolitan Sewerage District and taxpayers was estimated as $4.7 million. PCBs were banned from commerce in the US in the mid-1970s. The source of the PCB contamination was later determined to be a shuttered die-casting facility. The PCBs made their way to the treatment plant when sewer lines were cleaned years after the facility stopped operation.

The United States Geological Survey analyzed in 2014 nine different consumer products containing biosolids as a main ingredient for 87 organic chemicals found in cleaners, personal care products, pharmaceuticals, and other products. This analysis detected 55 of the 87 organic chemicals measured in at least one of the nine biosolid samples, with 45 chemicals found in Milorganite.

The incidence and effects of per- and polyfluoroalkyl substances (PFOs and PFA) in Milorganite, and municipal waste in general — as a part of the waste stream, and as a source of water and environmental contamination — has been a subject of study, controversy and concern.

== See also ==
- Water resource management
