= Jones Island Water Reclamation Facility =

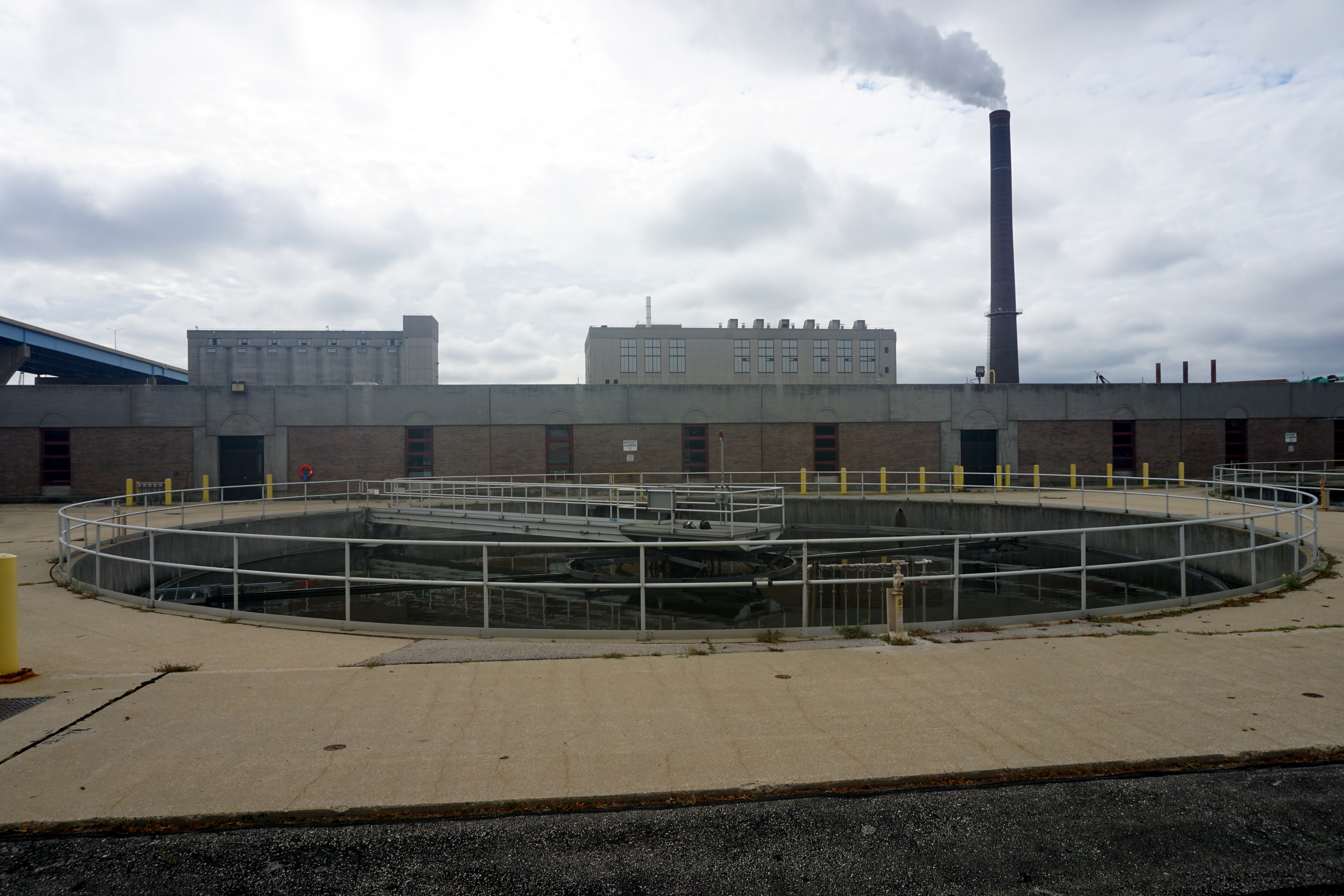
- Jones Island Water Reclamation Facility in 2022
- Interactive map of Jones Island Water Reclamation Facility
- Location: 700 E. Jones St. Milwaukee, Wisconsin 53207
- Coordinates: 43°01′23″N 87°53′58″W
- Built: 1926

The Jones Island Water Reclamation Facility is a wastewater treatment plant located on Jones Island along the Lake Michigan shore in Milwaukee, Wisconsin, United States. It is listed on the National Register of Historic Places and was designated as a National Historic Civil Engineering Landmark by the American Society of Civil Engineers in 1974.

== History and operation ==
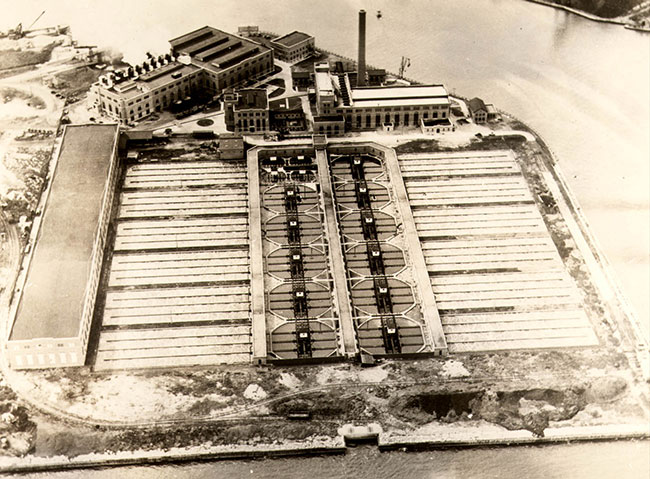
The plant in 1926

Since 1926, the Jones Island facility has both been in operation and has been producing the fertilizer Milorganite as a byproduct of the wastewater treatment process. It was one of the first wastewater treatment plants to be constructed in the United States, as well as one of the first to produce a marketable fertilizer.

Prior to the completion of the plant, sewage and industrial waste in Milwaukee were both discharged directly into Lake Michigan. In 1936, a "mysterious epidemic" that affected 120,000 people in Milwaukee, roughly 20% of the city's population at the time, was ultimately linked to contaminated water that had been discharged from the Jones Island facility without being treated. The epidemic was successfully ended by a boil-water advisory. In 1972, the United States Environmental Protection Agency (EPA) commended the plant for implementing phosphorus-removal capabilities ahead of schedule. In 1989, due to the release of cyanide and metals from the facility into Lake Michigan, the EPA included it on a list of 879 industrial facilities around the country that were not meeting government standards regarding the release of chemicals into waterways.

In 1997, United Water Resources signed a ten-year contract with the Milwaukee Metropolitan Sewerage District (MMSD) to manage the Jones Island facility, creating the largest public–private partnership in the United States at the time. Currently owned by MMSD, the plant is operated and managed by Veolia as part of an ongoing public-private partnership. It is one of two wastewater treatment plants serving the Milwaukee metropolitan area, along with a facility in Oak Creek, Wisconsin.

== Wastewater treatment ==
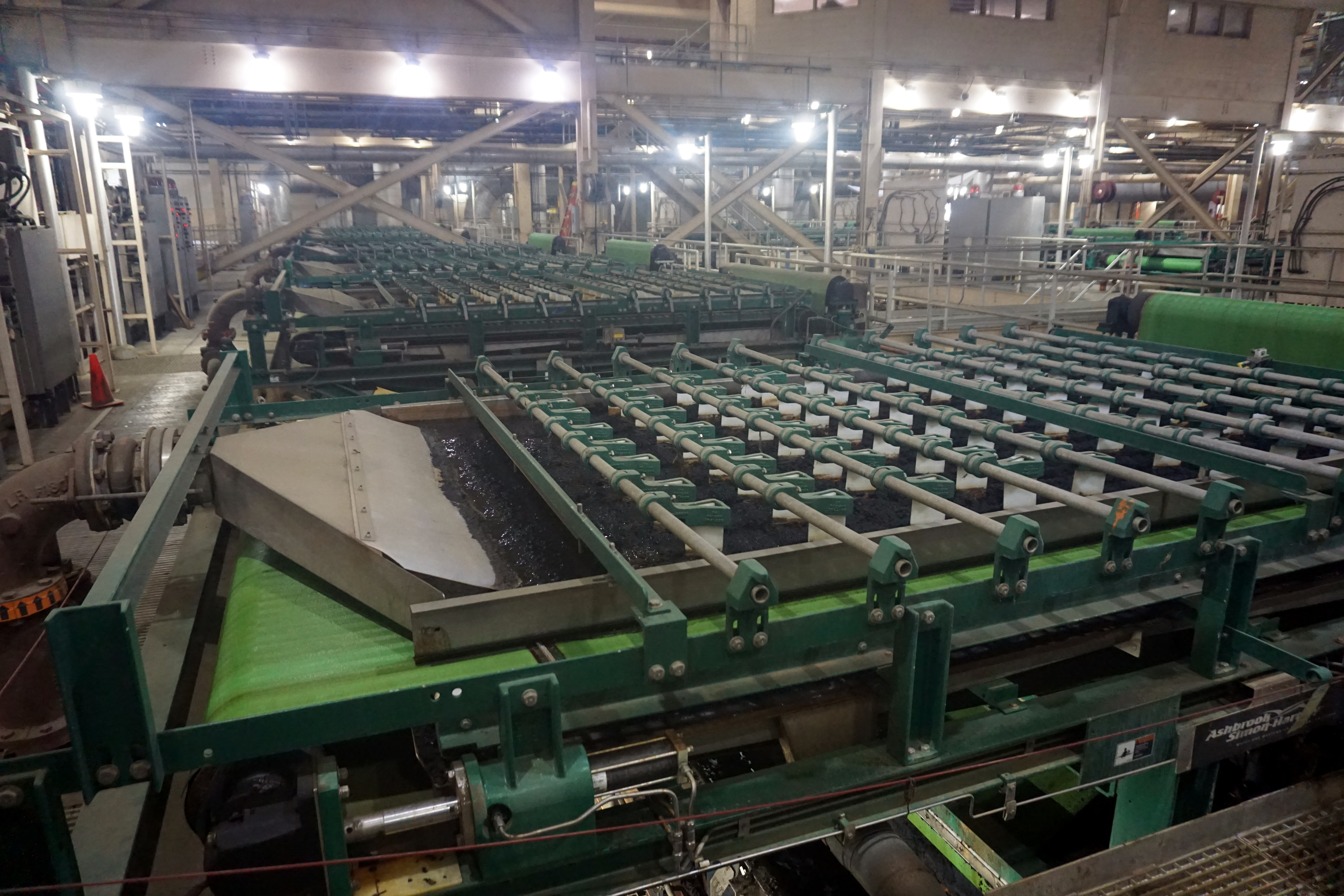
Interior of the plant

As of 2015, the Jones Island facility can treat over 300,000,000 US gallons (1.1×10^{9} L) of wastewater daily. It serves 1.1 million people in 28 municipalities throughout Southeastern Wisconsin. The plant sits at the end of a network that includes 3,000 miles (4,800 km) of household laterals, another 3,000 miles (4,800 km) of sanitary sewers, and the 28.5-mile (45.9 km) Deep Tunnel Project, the latter of which can hold 521,000,000 U.S. gallons (1.97×10^{9} L) of wastewater and largely prevents overflow events.

Milwaukee uses a combined sewer system, which brings both sewage and urban runoff to the Jones Island facility to be treated before the water is discharged into Lake Michigan. Wastewater takes about 24 hours to travel to the treatment plant, be treated, and then be discharged into the lake. The water returned to the lake from the plant is cleaner than the lake water itself.

At the Jones Island facility, wastewater treatment begins with screening, followed by primary clarification in circular holding tanks. Water then travels to storage channels where bacteria (including Aspidisca, Arcella, and Vorticella) digest the remaining impurities in the wastewater. The bacteria have a short lifespan, and the sludge containing the dead bacteria is dried, heated (at 900 °F (482 °C) to 1,200 °F (649 °C)), and tumbled to a uniform size to make Milorganite. As of 2017, the plant was producing roughly 45,000 tons of Milorganite a year. Its production is considered to be one of the largest recycling programs in the world, and it surpasses the EPA's "Exceptional Quality" rating and is certified by the United States Department of Agriculture due to its renewable origins.

== Tours ==
By 2015, more than 20,000 members of the public have toured the Jones Island facility, many at the annual Doors Open Milwaukee event. Tours are a major part of MMSD's outreach and public education program. In the mid-2010s, more than 4,000 people were touring the facility annually.
