= Kinnickinnic River (Milwaukee River tributary) =

River in Milwaukee, Wisconsin

Coordinates: 43°01′33″N 87°53′24″W

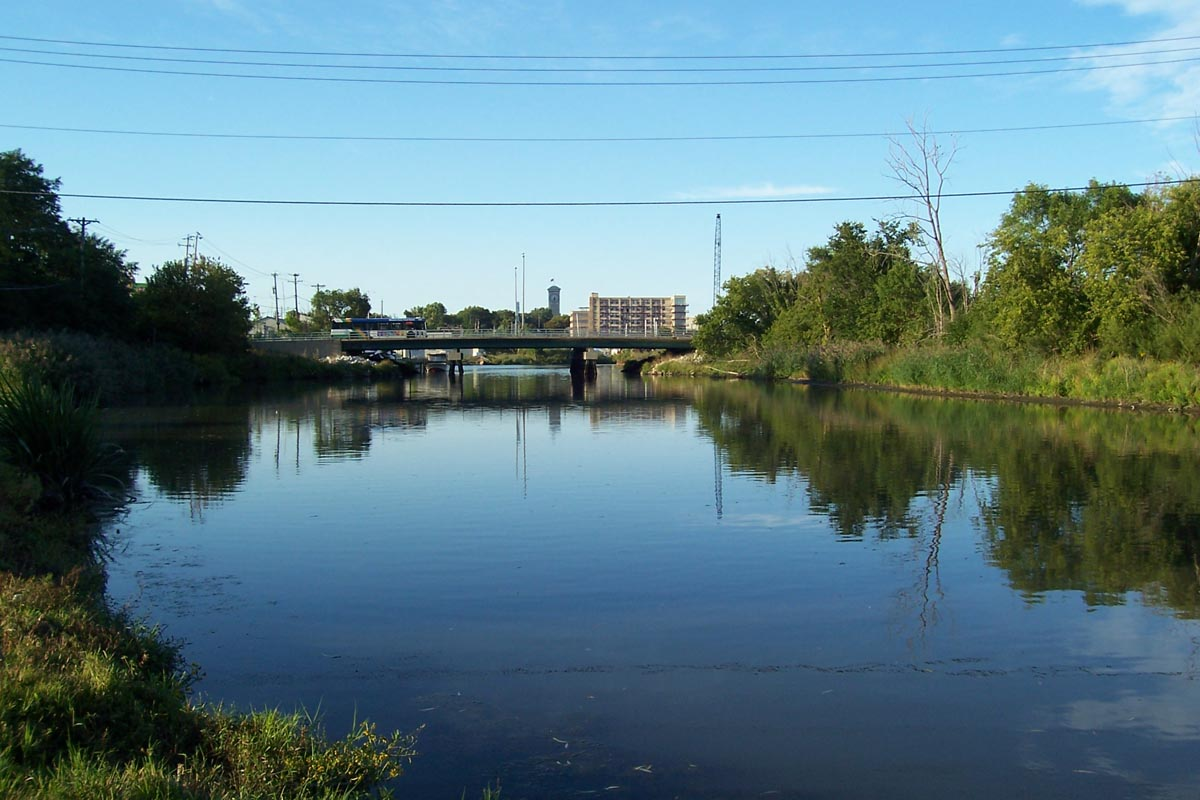
- Looking north from Baran Park

Physical characteristics
- Source
  - location: Greenfield, Wisconsin
- Mouth: Milwaukee River
  - location: Milwaukee, Wisconsin
- Length: 9.6 miles (15.4 km)
- Discharge
  - location: Lake Michigan

The Kinnickinnic River is a river in southeastern Wisconsin, United States. The river is 9.6 miles (15.4 km) long and flows east from its source in Milwaukee County, Wisconsin toward downtown Milwaukee, where it joins the Milwaukee River and the Menomonee River before emptying into Lake Michigan. It is locally called the "KK River".

Kinnickinnic is an Ojibwe word that literally means "what is mixed", referring to the mixing of indigenous plants and tobaccos. Often called Milwaukee's forgotten river, it is the smallest within the Milwaukee River Basin, yet is the most urbanized and densely populated, as it winds through the Lincoln Village neighborhood and the heavily industrialized Inner Harbor.

== History ==
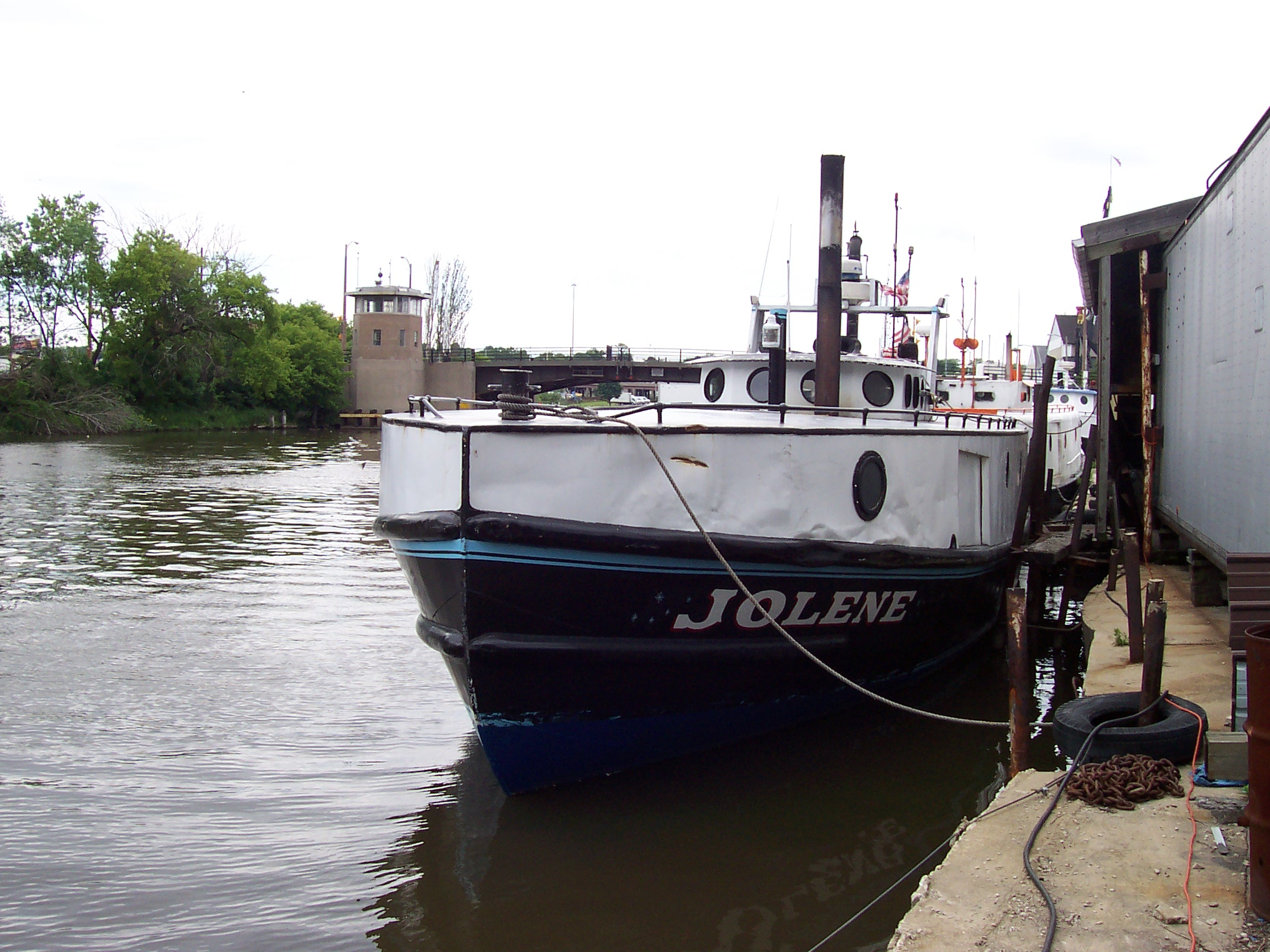
KK River fishing fleet, looking west.

Milwaukee was founded in 1846 to utilize a natural harbor formed by the confluence of rivers immediately before flowing into Lake Michigan, similar to Manistee, Michigan and Benton Harbor, Michigan. The Kinnickinnic River is the southernmost of the three rivers, flowing in a generally northeastern direction towards the harbor. The Menomonee River enters from the west, and the Milwaukee River enters from the north.

Originally, the Kinnickinnic River flowed almost directly into Lake Michigan, with water from the Milwaukee and Menomonee rivers flowing south from the center of the city before exiting to the lake. The landform that protected the harbor was a long marshy spit, called Jones Island, that extended southwards from the center of the city. To shorten the distance from the harbor entrance to the city, a "straight cut" was made across the base of the spit, at the northern end. The original harbor entrance was filled in, so that Jones Island was now a peninsula extending northwards, with its base to the south. This effectively lengthened the river, and this new stretch now formed a large portion of the harbor.

Shipping traffic in Milwaukee eventually outgrew the "inner" harbor formed by the three rivers. An "outer" harbor was constructed in the lake, with the lake-facing edge of Jones Island serving as the docking area. The inhabitants of Jones Island were forced to leave, and those that were small commercial fishermen moved operations farther up the Kinnickinnic. The commercial fishing fleet now resides in the stretch of river near the 1st Street Bridge, along with a small pleasure craft.

Upstream, starting near I-94/43, the river is lined with concrete. The concrete was installed on the river banks in the 1960s as a solution to minimize flooding in the surrounding neighborhoods. Even with the concrete in place, flooding has persisted, and water in the channel is capable of extremely high velocities.

== Description ==
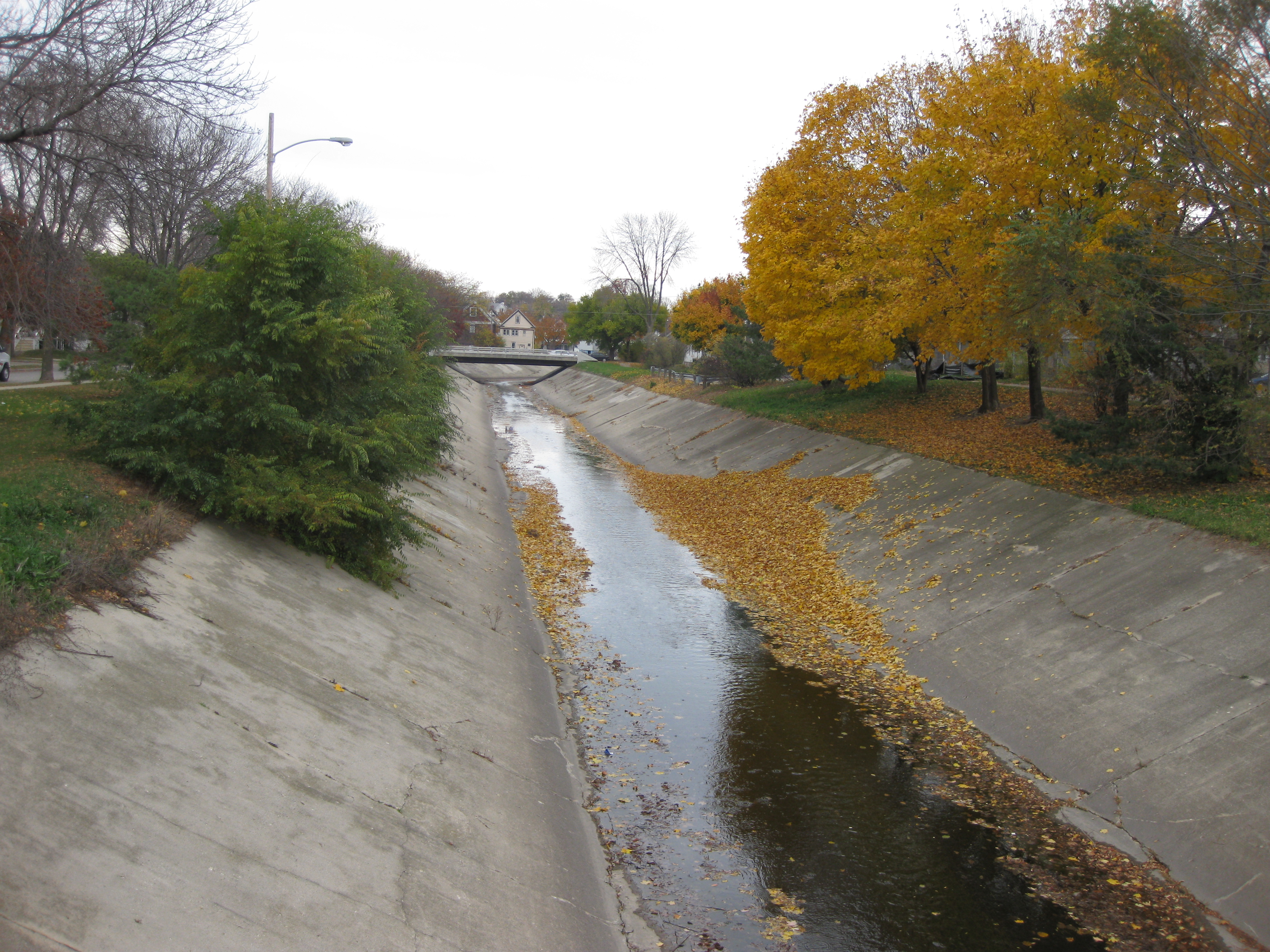
KK River concrete channel, looking east.

=== Watershed ===
The Kinnickinnic River is 9.6 miles (15.4 km) long, with a watershed that covers 25 square miles (65 km^{2}) of drainage area. Along with the main river, many of the tributaries have been extensively modified through concrete channeling. Roughly 145,000 people live in the watershed, making it the most densely populated in the region. Almost the entire watershed is built out, and the vast majority of its land use is urban.

High levels of industrial pollutants, diminished access for public use, and lack of a vegetative buffer have caused much of the community to perceive the waterways as nothing more than a network of municipal sewage drainage channels.

The river's estuary empties into Lake Michigan at the Milwaukee harbor, along with the Milwaukee River and Menomonee River.

=== Pollution problems ===
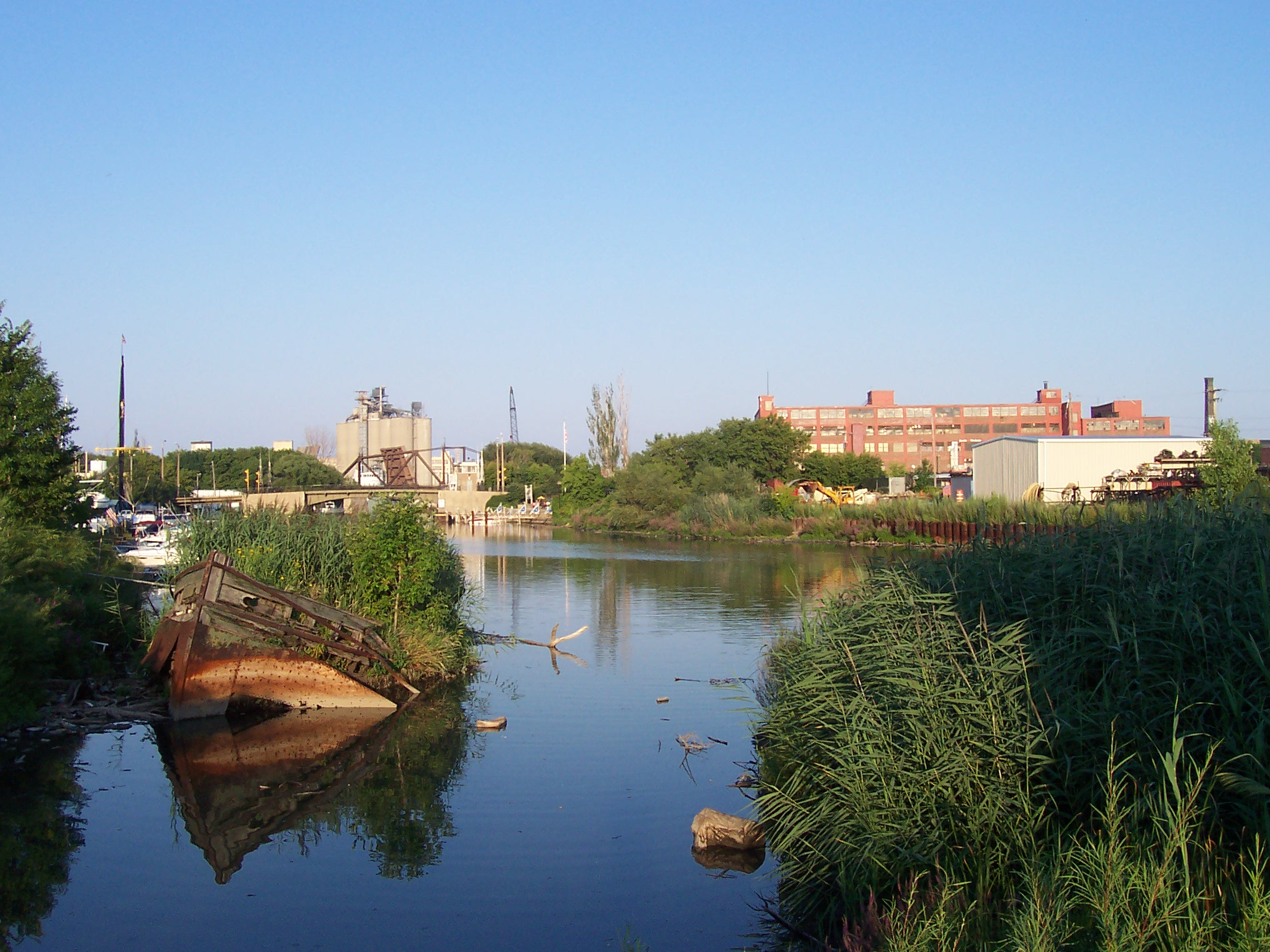
Debris in the Kinnickinnic.

The lowermost portion of the Kinnickinnic River is included in the Milwaukee Estuary Area of Concern, which is one of the Great Lakes Areas of Concern. In the Kinnickinnic, this is due to high levels of PCBs and PAHs found in the river. For this reason, in 2007, the Kinnickinnic was also listed as the 7th most endangered river in the U.S. by American Rivers.

=== Revitalization ===
Future plans and recent activity has started to reshape the river. In the fall of 2009, dredging removed 167,000 cubic yards (128,000 m^{3}) of sediment contaminated with PCBs and PAHs near the harbor. In addition to improved environmental conditions, the dredging created a safer, deeper, and more navigable river.

Plans to remove the concrete in the river channel are already underway as part of a flood mitigation project under the direction of the Milwaukee Metropolitan Sewerage District (MMSD). A new river channel alignment will accommodate excessive rainwater, slow its velocity, and restore the river back towards a natural state with accessible green space and unobstructed passage for aquatic habitat.

In 2009, a neighborhood plan was developed to improve conditions in the river corridor by building off the flood mitigation work. In addition to the river, areas of focus include adjacent and nearby parks, open space, housing, businesses, transportation, and education opportunities.
