= 2010 Milwaukee flood =

July 2010 flood event in Milwaukee, Wisconsin

Two episodes of flash flooding in the Milwaukee area during a one-week period caused flooding of basements and streets in July 2010.

== Extent of flooding ==
The first incident occurred in the night on July 15 to July 16. Seven days later on July 22 up to 7.5 inches (190 mm) of rain fell in two hours. This unusually heavy rainfall turned streets and freeways into rivers and impassable ponds. Because of the massive amount of rain in such a short amount of time, it caused sewer backups in many areas of the county. The hardest hit were the Kentrel is areas of Shorewood, Whitefish Bay, Glendale, and North-eastern Milwaukee with water reaching five feet in some areas. The areas had just recovered from the earlier flood and were beginning to resume normalcy. The phrase 'insult to injury' was echoed among many of the TV stations for their plight. Other severe floods causing ditches to flow over and basement damage occurred in Fox Point.

== Fatality and extent of damages ==
The flooding also caused one confirmed death, as 19-year-old Kyle Prelesnik's body was recovered from Lincoln Creek about eight blocks away from his car which he had been driving in the storm. The cause of the car going into the creek is pending. It is estimated that the latter storm caused flooding damage of about $37 million. Governor Jim Doyle declared a State of Emergency for Milwaukee County on July 23 as more than ten inches of rain had fallen between the two storms. Damage from flood waters and backed-up sewage led to a decision in November 2010 to demolish the former St. Michael Hospital, a seven-story 800,000-square-foot (74,000 m^{2}) building that had been largely vacant since the hospital closed in 2006. A large sinkhole at the intersection of Oakland and North Avenues on Milwaukee's East Side was large enough for vehicles to be engulfed by. The severe weather closed Mitchell International Airport, causing a so-called rain-in. The runways were flooded with high water grounding local flights, and causing incoming flights to be diverted.

== Damage to media outlets ==
Media coverage was hampered as the heavy rains caused flooding and damage to equipment at several television stations. The rain caused a sewer to back up inside television stations WVTV-TV and WCGV-TV, damaging equipment and causing the stations to go off-air until the next afternoon. Local television operations did not resume until later in the weekend. Flooding of a creek next to the transmission facility for WDJT-TV, WMLW-TV, WBME-TV and WYTU-LP (which with WISN-TV are based in Lincoln Park along the Milwaukee River) also caused all four stations to go dark, and news operations on WDJT were affected as the station's microwave relay for ENG vehicles was not operational. For much of the weekend, rival station WTMJ-TV simulcast WDJT on a digital subchannel, repaying an arrangement made to simulcast WTMJ on a WDJT subchannel earlier in the year after WTMJ's tower was struck by lightning. During the intense rain, several stations experienced rain fade on satellite reception so severe that network programming had to be temporarily suspended, either by use of a technical difficulties message or, in the case of WDJT, airing impromptu news and weather coverage.

The damage caused by the flood eventually hastened the move of WVTV/WCGV to a repurposed commercial building alongside Interstate 41 at the end of 2013.

== Aftermath ==
In the aftermath of the flooding, the state of Wisconsin requested emergency assistance from the Federal Emergency Management Agency, but the initial request was rejected because there was not enough damage reported to qualify for assistance. In August, after Governor Doyle appealed the rejection and submitted additional information on damages, the state received a "Public Assistance" declaration that authorized federal aid in connection with flooding and storm damage to public facilities in Milwaukee County and Grant County, Wisconsin, during the period July 20–24. Calumet County was later added to the declaration. In September, President Barack Obama issued an "Individual Assistance declaration" that authorized federal aid for damaged homes and businesses.

== See also ==
- 2025 Milwaukee flood
