= Menomonee River =

River in Milwaukee, Wisconsin

Coordinates: 43°01′56″N 87°54′41″W

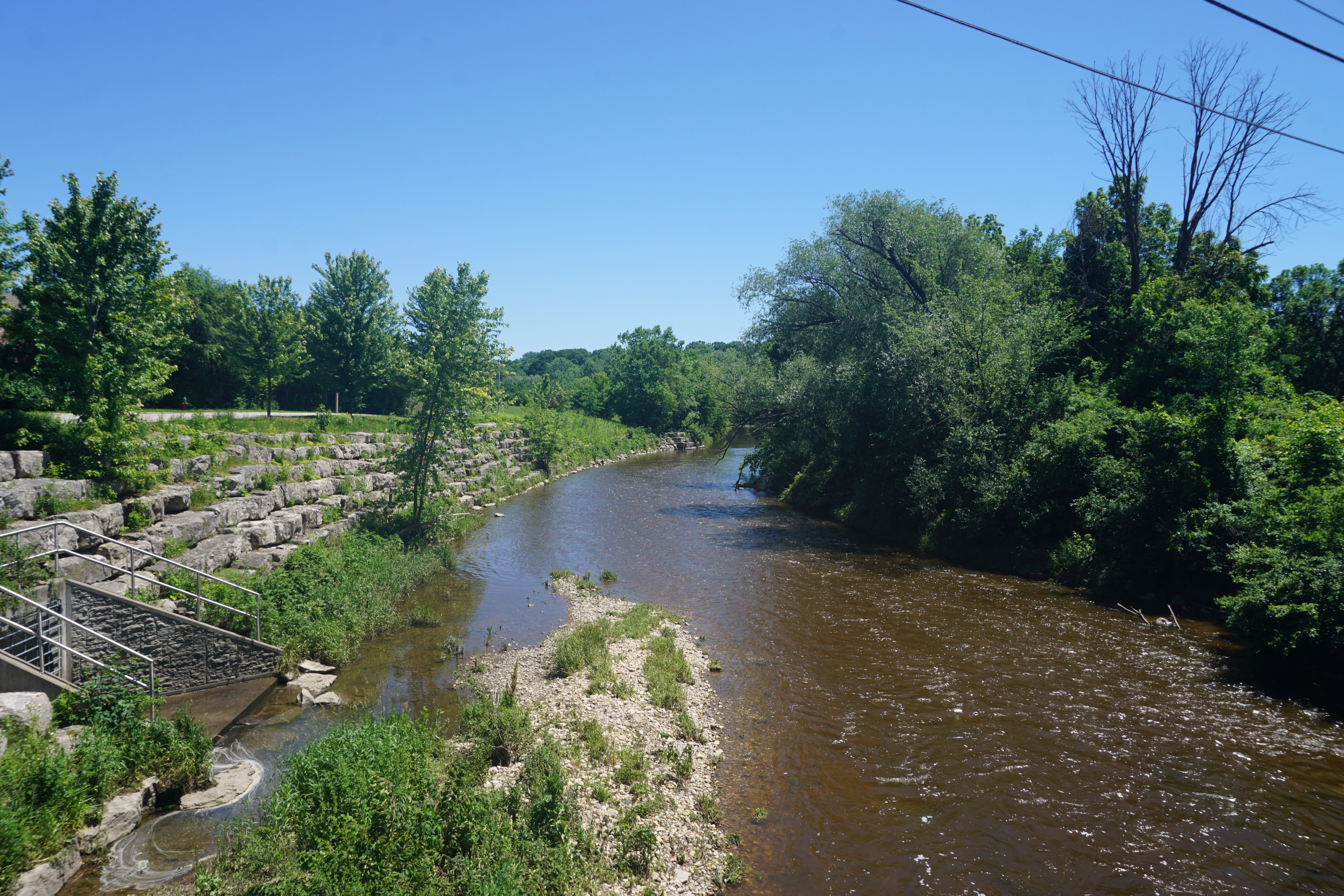
- The Menomonee River in Wauwatosa, Wisconsin

Physical characteristics
- Source
  - location: Germantown, Wisconsin
- Mouth: Milwaukee River
  - location: Milwaukee, Wisconsin
- Length: 33 m (108 ft)
- Discharge
  - location: Lake Michigan

The Menomonee River is a river in southeastern Wisconsin, United States. Originating in Germantown, Wisconsin, the river is 33.0 miles (53.1 km) long and flows east toward Milwaukee, where it joins the Milwaukee River and the Kinnickinnic River before emptying into Lake Michigan.

== Description ==
Named after the Menomonee (also spelled Menominee) Indians, the word was given to the Menomonee people by the Chippewa people, and in the Chippewa language literally means "rice eaters" referring to the abundant wild rice that once grew along its shores in the Menomonee Valley. A tributary of the Milwaukee River, it is the most industrialized within the Milwaukee River Basin.

== Watershed ==
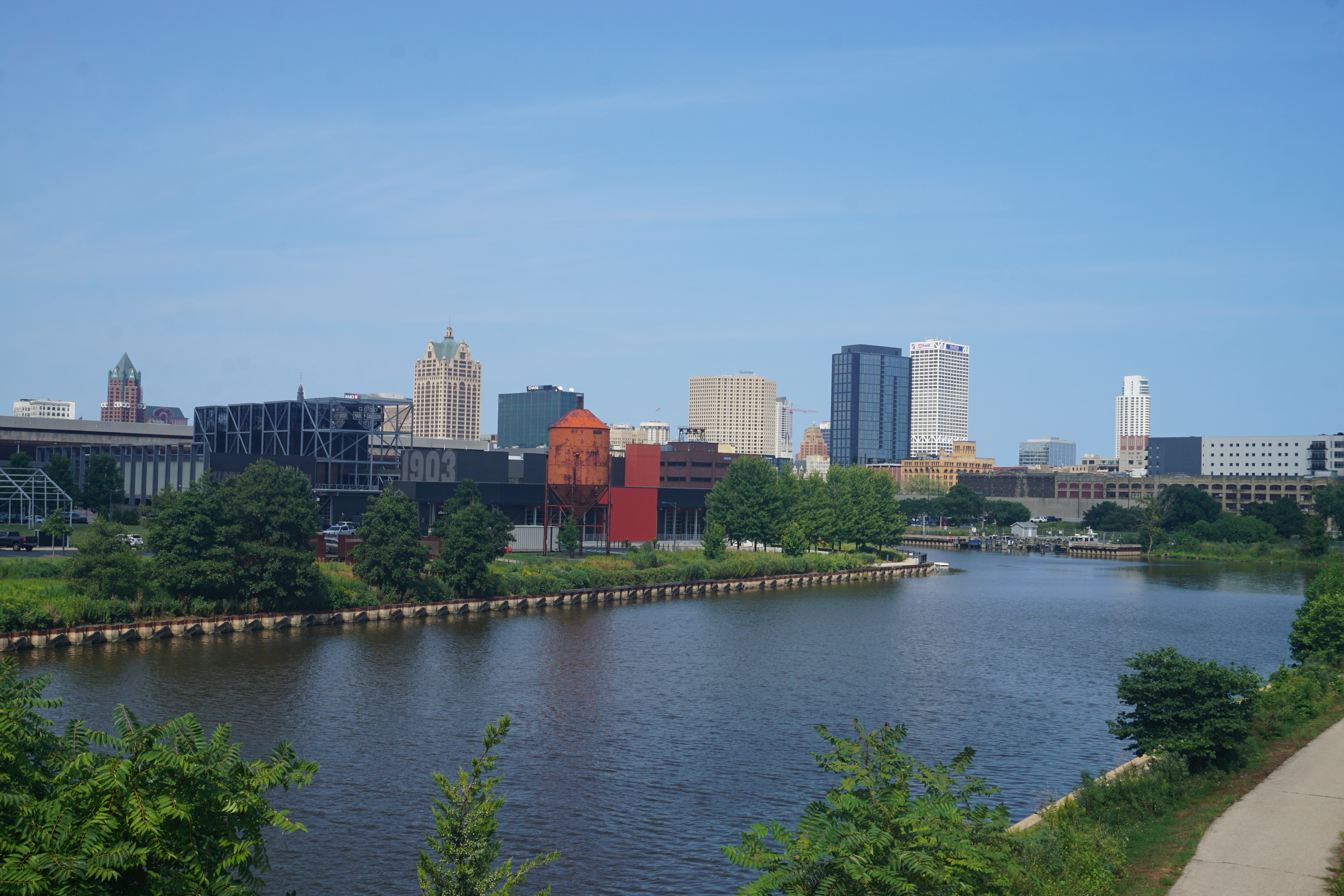
View of the Menomonee River looking northeast from the 6th Street Viaduct

The Menomonee River is 33.0 miles (53.1 km) long, and empties into Lake Michigan at Milwaukee. Not to be confused with longer rivers named after the same Indian tribe. With a watershed that covers approximately 140 square miles (360 km^{2}) of urban landscape, it is home to a population of more than 336,670 people. This includes portions of Washington, Ozaukee, Waukesha, and Milwaukee counties. A large swath of the river has been heavily channelized and industrialized as it runs through the Menomonee Valley. This has become a primary source of pollution for the river.

Its estuary empties into Lake Michigan from the Milwaukee River near the Milwaukee harbor, along with the Kinnickinnic River to the south.

== Parks ==
Public Parks along the Menomonee River
Parks	Location
Three Bridges Park, Valley Park, Doyne Park, Granville Dog Park	Milwaukee
Charles C. Jacobus Park, Hart Park, Hoyt Park, Hansen Park, Hartung Park, Currie Park, Webster Park	Wauwatosa
Frontier Park	Butler
Rotary Park, Rivers Edge Park, Lime Kiln Park, Village Park	Menomonee Falls
Haupt Strasse Park, Shoen Laufen Park	Germantown
