= Acme (band) =

Japanese rock band

ACME
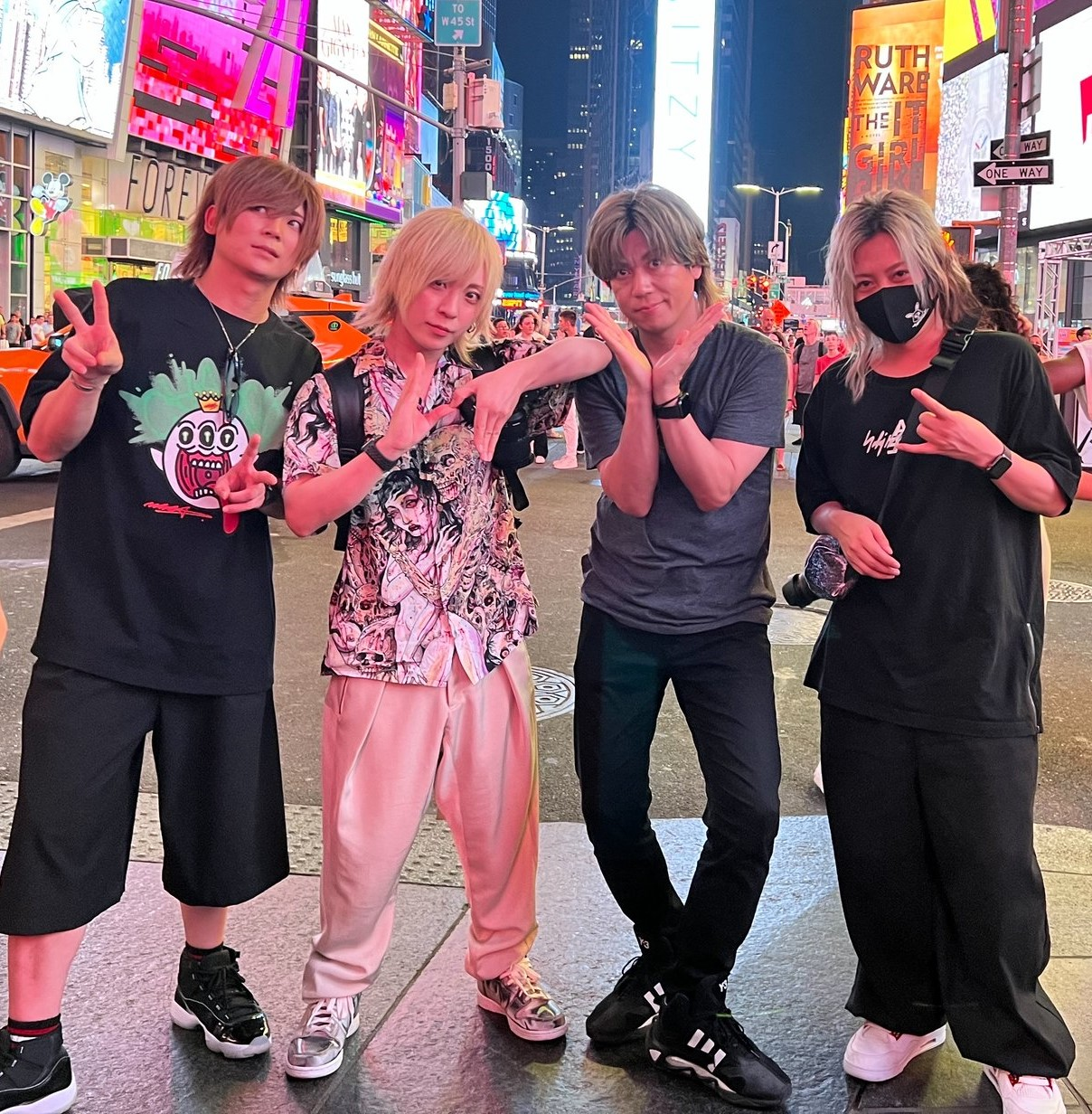
- ACME in New York City (2022). From left to right: RIKITO, CHISA, HAL, SHOGO

Background information
- Origin: Tokyo, Japan
- Genres: Metalcore; hard rock; punk rock
- Years active: 2017–present
- Members: CHISA; SHOGO; RIKITO; HAL
- Website: acme-official.com

Acme (Japanese: アクメ, Hepburn: Akume; stylized as ACME) are a Japanese visual kei metalcore band formed in 2017 with the concept of "delinquent boys from another world." The band consists of four members: CHISA (vocals), SHOGO (guitar), RIKITO (bass), and HAL (drums). Known for their post-hardcore musical style and colorful visuals, ACME has gained attention for their high-energy live performances. ACME have toured in the United States and Canada, and were the only visual kei band to complete a U.S. tour in 2021. JRock News ranked ACME as the second best visual kei artist of 2022. Currently ACME are self-managed and operate as an independent band, not signed to a label.

== Career ==
=== 2017–2020: Formation and beginnings ===
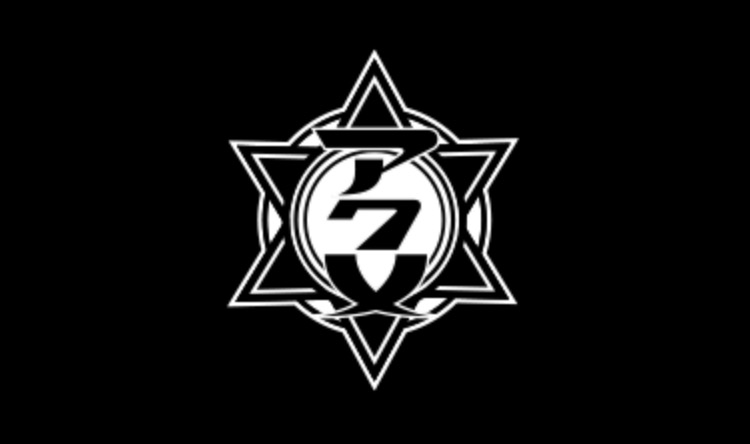
ACME's debut logo in 2017. Retired in late 2020.

ACME were formed in 2017 by DIV band members CHISA and SHOGO. Shortly before ACME's formation, the two played as a temporary duo called CHISA&SHOGO with support on the bass by support bassist RIKITO and the drums by drummer HAL (ex-ARTEMA). The four announced their debut as a new band, called アクメ, on 27 June 2017 at the NicoNico Headquarters. ACME released their debut mini-album, SENKOU, on 2 August 2017 accompanied with a tour across Japan. A few months later due to health problems, bassist RIKITO took a pause in band activities and resumed in April 2018. On 7 March 2018, the group released the single "Rotten Orange" with three members. In August 2018, they released their first full-length album, Zesshououka.

In 2019 ACME performed their first concert in the United States, performing at Anime Milwaukee convention from 15 to 17 February in Wisconsin. After announcing their single "Mononoke Requiem," they returned in the same year for A-Kon in Dallas from 27 to 30 June and also held a show in California in July. ACME's first tour in United States took place with Canadian metalcore band, Red Handed Denial, in January 2020. Due to the onset of the COVID-19 pandemic and infection control measures in Japan regarding live shows, ACME pivoted to globally livestreaming their concerts with no in-person audiences in March, August, and October of 2020. The band also began regularly livestreaming on their YouTube channel during 2020. At the end of 2020, the band announced they would be changing the spelling of their name from アクメ in katakana to "ACME" in English letters, in face of their growing global audience.

=== 2021–present ===
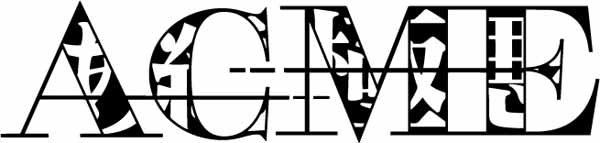
ACME's logo since 2021.

On 29 March 2021, ACME released their single "Come Back to You." This was the band's first single after their name change, differing from their previous releases as they collaborated with several prominent, international artists to create the release including Grammy-nominated producer Seann Bowe, recording engineer Daihei Yamanaka, and mixing engineer Zakk Cervini.This was ACME's first release with a foreign producer and the first visual kei music video to feature a Black female lead, Katie Sachiko Scott. Due to the continuation of COVID-19 and infection control restrictions regarding live shows, ACME continued regularly livestreaming to interact with their audiences. In October 2021, they held their first solo tour "UNBREAKABLE TOUR," performing seven shows in Japan and four in the U.S.

In January 2022, they released their single "Enchanted," paired with a music video filmed in Hollywood during their U.S. tour. ACME announced a North American tour dubbed "Wildfire" for summer 2022 with six performances, this time featuring the band's first show in Canada and first appearance in many U.S. cities including Austin, New York City, and Pittsburgh at Tekko anime convention. From April 2022, ACME began hosting a weekly radio segment on SKYWAVE FM Chiba, titled "ACME STATION" which aired its last radio segment in September 2024. Their third studio album, Resisted Temptation, was released digitally in November 2022. They then continued to tour in Japan during the "ACME LIVE TOUR 2022 in Japan" performing in nine cities.

In February 2023 they released their single "SENNOU" and announced two shows in the U.S., performing at Anime Detour convention in Minnesota and also in California. In August 2023, ACME released the dual single, "ULFHEĐNAR" / "Tasogare" and held their first ever free live concert in collaboration with Tower Records in Shibuya. They then returned to the U.S. during November 2023 on their "Reborn as the Berserker" Tour, performing in three cities including Sin City Anime convention in Las Vegas, Kumoricon convention in Portland, and in Costa Mesa, CA. Upon their return to Japan, ACME continued the "Reborn as the Berserker" Tour with ten shows and the finale at Shibuya Cyclone in January 2024.

ACME returned to the U.S. to perform at Kawaii Kon 2024. Since then, ACME released their newest album, PARTY METAL ANTHEM, in May 2024, touring in Japan for the remainder of 2024. In 2025 and early 2026, the band launched the ACME YABA! Live Tour, performing a total of13 shows in Japan and the U.S.

== Members ==
- Chisa – vocals
- Shogo (将吾) – guitar
- Rikito – bass
- Hal – drums, piano

== Discography ==
=== Albums ===
- SENKOU (2017)
- Zesshououka (2018)
- WE ARE VISUAL KEI (2020)
- Resisted Temptation (2022)
- PARTY METAL ANTHEM (2024)

=== Singles ===
- "Maguro Kaitai Chainsaw" (2017)
- "Rotten Orange" (2018)
- "Last One Show" (2019)
- "Houkago no Shiiku" (2019)
- "Mononoke Requiem" (2019)
- "Wonderful World" (2019)
- "USOGAO" (2020)
- "GIFT" (2020)
- "RISING SUN" (2020)
- "Come Back to You" (2021)
- "Gekkouyouku" (2021)
- "Enchanted" (2022)
- "Heaven's Door" (2022)
- "Kagaribi" (2022)
- "SENNOU" (2023)
- "ULFHEĐNAR" (2023)
- "Tasogare" (2023)
- "STAND UP" (2024)
- "HYAKUIRO RINNE" (2024)
- "Modern Day Witch Hunt" (2025)
- "Y.A.B.A." (2025)

=== DVDs ===
- ACME 1st Anniversary First ONE-MAN Live "Freshman Year PKPK" & MUSIC VIDEO CLIPS (2018)
- ACME 1st ONE-MAN TOUR ZESSHOU OUKA FINAL at Shibuya CLUB QUATTRO (2019)
- ACME 2nd ONE-MAN TOUR [No.13] FINAL at Shibuya club asia (2020)
