= Aztec Empire (graphic novel) =

Web graphic novel series by Paul Guinan

- Cell from the Aztec Empire Graphic Novel
- No. of issues: 8 chapters as of February 2023
- Publisher: Big Red Hair

Creative team
- Writers: Paul Guinan
- Artists: David Hahn

The Aztec Empire graphic novel is a historical recounting of the Spanish conquest of the Aztec Empire. It is written by Paul Guinan, produced by Anina Bennett and illustrated by David Hahn.

== Development and content ==
Paul Guinan came up with the idea of a graphic novel about Aztec civilization in the years leading up to the 500th anniversary of the Spanish conquest of the Aztec Empire. He had repeatedly noted a lack of coverage on the topic in popular culture and wished to remedy this through an own series of comics. In 2019, he contacted several Mexican historians, archaeologists, and anthropologists in order to ensure historical accuracy before he started writing.

Created under the motto "History is stranger than fiction", the team behind the graphic novel, made up of Paul Guinan, Anina Bennett and illustrator David Hahn, have published eight chapters as of February 2023. The series is unique as it includes a list of references and research notes, as the series places a particular emphasis on historical accuracy; portraying recreations of indigenous figures such as their background, fashion, and history. Guinan frequently consults experts to avoid inaccuracies that may appear in development. The artists also document their progress and research live on their social media feeds.

The first book in the series is slated to contain ten chapters. With six chapters published the creators estimated that they had told about ten percent of the story.

== Awards ==
- Nominated for an Eisner Award for Best Digital Comic of 2019
- Nominated for the Mike Wieringo's Ringo Award for Best Webcomic 2019

== See also ==
- Boilerplate robot
- Cheval Noir

== Bibliography ==
Notes

References

- Andersen, Morten Scriver; Kindtler-Nielsen, Bue (2023). "Ny tecknad serie väcker aztekerna till liv". Världens Historia [History of the World] (in Swedish). No. 5. Bonnier Publications International. pp. 64–67. ISSN 0806-4709.
- Anderson, David S. (June 11, 2019). "Aztec Empire Brought To Life In New Graphic Novel". Forbes.
- "Aztec Empire, the comic about the splendor and the conquest of ancient Mexico". Mexicanist. 2020.
- Provan, Josh (March 21, 2020). "Book Review: Aztec Empire by Paul Guinan and illustrated by David Hahn". PUB.
- "2019 Ringo Awards". Ringo Awards. 2019.
- Whitbrook, James (July 19, 2019). "Here Are Your 2019 Eisner Awards Winners". Gizmodo.
