= Rose City Comic Con =

Annual comic book convention in Portland, Oregon, U.S.

- Status: Active
- Genre: Comic book convention
- Venue: Lloyd Center Doubletree Hotel (2012); Oregon Convention Center (2013–present)
- Location: Portland, Oregon
- Country: United States
- Inaugurated: 2012
- Founders: Ron Brister, Paula Brister
- Attendance: 70,000 (2019)
- Budget: $20,000 in Year 1.
- Organizer: (2011–2017) Flashpoint Media, LLC (2017-current) LeftField Media
- Website: www.rosecitycomiccon.com

Rose City Comic Con (RCCC) is an annual comic book and pop culture convention that takes place in Portland, Oregon, each September.

== History ==
Panelists at the 2024 event

RCCC was founded by Ron Brister and his partner Paula Brister while on a road trip to San Diego Comic-Con in July 2011. The founders decided that Portland, Oregon, was missing an event that would captivate Portlanders with the same charm as San Diego and the northwest's favorite event, Emerald City Comic Con.

From that road trip, after much discussion, and with a budget of less than $20,000, Ron and Paula Brister officially launched Rose City Comic Con in late summer of 2011 with the first event scheduled to run the following year in October 2012. After further research, however, the event was rescheduled to September in order to not be in between the Baltimore Comic-Con and the New York Comic Con (NYCC) that first year. The first official announcement of Rose City Comic Con took place at the Jet City Comics show.

The first convention in 2012 was held at the DoubleTree hotel near the Lloyd Center. The organizers knew that the show just needed to break even in order for it to be a success. They hoped for 750 attendees but realized the day before the first show that they would exceed that number. The bigger problem was where to hold it the second year.

The second annual event, held in 2013, was co-produced, co-funded, and co-organized by Emerald City Comic-Con, the largest comic book convention in the Pacific Northwest (which had seen significant expansion in the years prior). This transition moved RCCC to the Oregon Convention Center and took up halls A1, B, and C, totaling more than 120,000 square feet, and saw a 405% increase in attendance. Since 2013, Emerald City Comic-Con and Rose City Comic-Con have been a Pacific Northwest partnership stationed in its two biggest cities: Seattle and Portland.

In late 2013, the Portland-based Stumptown Comics Fest, which focused on small-press comics, went "on hiatus" and entered an into an operating agreement with Rose City Comic Con.

In February 2017, the founders and partners agreed to sell a majority stake ownership to LeftField Media which had been founded by the former executives within ReedPop. The two founders stayed on with the business while the partners from Emerald City Comic Con separated.

Both Ron and Paula Brister stayed with the company until Paula departed just before the COVID-19 pandemic in 2020. Ron stayed on in a consulting role only until early 2021.

The 2020 edition of the convention was canceled due to the COVID-19 pandemic.

== Dates and locations ==
Dates	Location	Guests
September 8–9, 2012	DoubleTree Portland, Oregon	Richard Hatch, Noah Hathaway, Greg Rucka, Kelly Sue DeConnick, Matt Fraction, Ron Randall, Steve Lieber, Jeff Parker, and the entire Helioscope Studio (formerly Periscope Studio, also known as Mercury Studio)
September 20–21, 2013	The Oregon Convention Center Portland, Oregon	Sam Jones, Avery Brooks, Jewel Staite, Billy West, John DiMaggio, Alexis Cruz, David Giuntoli
September 20–21, 2014	The Oregon Convention Center Portland, Oregon	Wil Wheaton, Sean Astin, Gigi Edgley, Sasha Roiz, Clare Kramer, Wes Studi, Michael Biehn, Jennifer Blanc-Biehn, Garrett Wang, Jeremy Shada, Cam Clarke, Rob Paulsen, Joe Pantoliano, Ernie Hudson, Dirk Benedict, Robert Axelrod, Maurice LaMarche, Barry Gordon, Townsend Coleman, Renae Jacobs, Steve Cardenas, Nicholas Brendon
September 19–20, 2015	The Oregon Convention Center Portland, Oregon	Wil Wheaton, Nichelle Nichols, Reggie Lee, Walter Emanuel Jones, Carrie Fisher, Robert Englund, Manu Bennett, Elizabeth Henstridge, Brett Dalton, Ray Park, Brandon Routh, Olivia Olson, Zach Callison, Walter Koenig, Caroll Spinney, Lawrence Gilliard Jr.
September 10–11, 2016	The Oregon Convention Center Portland, Oregon	Jon Bernthal, Joan Cusack, John Cusack, Phil LaMarr, Steve Blum, Mark Meer, Billy Boyd, Stan Lee, Mary Elizabeth McGlynn, Jim Cummings, Peter Mayhew, Summer Glau, Chad L. Coleman
September 8–10, 2017	The Oregon Convention Center Portland, Oregon	Peter Capaldi, Pearl Mackie, James and Oliver Phelps, Burt Ward, William Shatner, Jason David Frank, "Weird Al" Yankovic, Dominic Cooper, Katee Sackhoff, Felicia Day, Karl Urban, Danielle Panabaker, Carlos Valdes, Jeremy Shada, Rose McIver, Charles Martinet, Troy Baker, John de Lancie, Brent Spiner
September 7–9, 2018	The Oregon Convention Center Portland, Oregon	Felicia Day, John Barrowman, Val Kilmer, Michael Rooker, Michael Biehn, Jennifer Blanc-Biehn, Chris Sullivan, Charlet Chung, Linda Blair, Michael Dorn, David Tennant
September 13–15, 2019	The Oregon Convention Center Portland, Oregon	TBD
~~September 11–13, 2020~~	The Oregon Convention Center Portland, Oregon	Cancelled due to COVID-19 pandemic
September 10–12, 2021	The Oregon Convention Center Portland, Oregon	George Takei, Antony Starr, Charles Martinet
September 9–11, 2022	The Oregon Convention Center Portland, Oregon	Sean Astin, Elijah Wood, Billy Dee Williams, LeVar Burton, Giancarlo Esposito, Sylvester McCoy, Rainn Wilson, Julie Benz, Amber Benson, Charisma Carpenter, Ross Marquand, Khary Payton, Christopher Sabbat, Jim Lee
September 22-24, 2023	The Oregon Convention Center Portland, Oregon	Zoe Saldaña, Karen Gillan, Critical Role, Anjali Bhimani, Alex Kingston, Arthur Darvill, Rebecca Romijn, Ralph Macchio, Jess Bush, Felicia Day, Eric Vale, Adam McArthur, Anne Yatco, Kaiji Tang
September 6-8, 2024	The Oregon Convention Center Portland, Oregon	Hayden Christensen, Rosario Dawson, Simon Pegg, Nick Frost, John Cho, Doug Jones, Charlie Cox, Brandon Rogers, Jason Isaacs, Steve Burns, Donovan Patton, Josh Dela Cruz, Tom Welling, Michael Rosenbaum
September 5-7, 2025	The Oregon Convention Center Portland, Oregon	The Goonies 40th Anniversary, Billie Piper, Christopher Eccleston, Parker Posey, Wil Wheaton, Katee Sackhoff, Edward James Olmos, Mary McDonnell, Carla Gugino, Henry Thomas, Annabeth Gish, Carl Lumbly, Liam O'Brien, Sam Riegel

== See also ==
- Culture of Portland, Oregon
- Geek Week PDX
