= UW–Milwaukee Panther Arena =

Arena in Wisconsin, United States

UW-Milwaukee Panther Arena

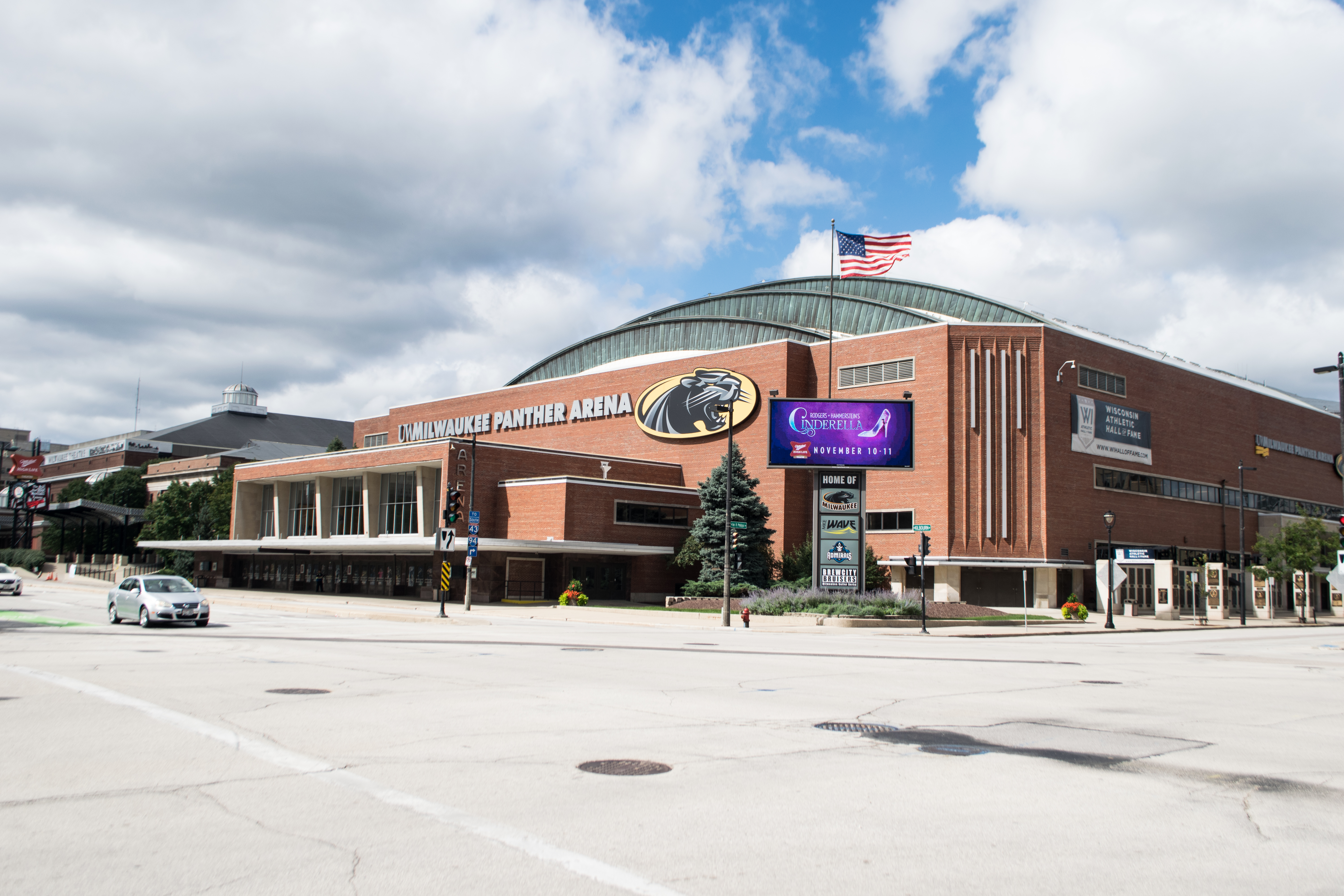
- View from southeast in 2018

- Location in the United States Location in Wisconsin
- Interactive map of UW-Milwaukee Panther Arena
- Former names: Milwaukee Arena (1950–1974); MECCA (The Milwaukee Exposition, Convention Center and Arena) (1974–1995); Wisconsin Center Arena (1995–2000); U.S. Cellular Arena (2000–2014)
- Address: 400 W Kilbourn Avenue
- Location: Milwaukee, Wisconsin, U.S.
- Coordinates: 43°2′32″N 87°55′1″W
- Owner: Wisconsin Center District
- Capacity: 12,700 (maximum); 10,783 (basketball); 9,500 (indoor soccer); 9,652 (ice hockey); 8,910 (permanent seats)
- Scoreboard: American Sign & Indicator (1968-1998)
- Public transit: MCTS

Construction
- Groundbreaking: November 3, 1948
- Opened: April 9, 1950
- Renovated: 1998, 2014, 2016
- Cost: US$7.6 million ($102 million in 2025 dollars)
- Architects: Eschweiler & Eschweiler
- General contractor: Hunzinger Construction Co.

Tenants
- Milwaukee Hawks (NBA) (1951–1955); Milwaukee Bucks (NBA) (1968–1988); Marquette Warriors (NCAA) (1974–1988); Milwaukee Admirals (IHL/AHL) (1977–1987, 2016–present); Milwaukee Does (WBL) (1978–1980); Milwaukee Panthers (NCAA) (1992–1998, 2003–2012, 2013–present); Milwaukee Wave (MASL) (2003–present); Brewcity Bruisers (WFTDA) (2007–2019); Milwaukee Bonecrushers (CIFL) (2008–2009); Green Bay Chill (LFL) (2014)

Website
- uwmilwaukeepantherarena.com

The UW–Milwaukee Panther Arena (originally the Milwaukee Arena and formerly MECCA Arena and U.S. Cellular Arena) is an indoor arena located in Milwaukee, Wisconsin. The arena, which seats as many as 12,700 people and offers 41,700 square feet (3,874 m^{2}) of floor space, is part of a larger downtown campus, that includes the Milwaukee Theatre and Wisconsin Center.

It currently serves as the home to the American Hockey League's Milwaukee Admirals, NCAA Division I Milwaukee Panthers men's basketball team, and Major Arena Soccer League's Milwaukee Wave. It was formerly home to the Milwaukee Hawks (1951–1955) and Milwaukee Bucks of the NBA (1968–1988), and hosted the 1977 NBA All-Star Game. The venue was also home to Marquette University's men's basketball team from 1974 to 1988.

== History ==
The arena opened in 1950 and was one of the first to accommodate the needs of broadcast television. It was folded into MECCA (The Milwaukee Exposition, Convention Center and Arena) when the complex opened in 1974. It is also known for its former, uniquely painted basketball court by Robert Indiana in 1978, with large orange 'M's taking up both half-courts representing Milwaukee. The Indiana floor was purchased by a fan in the early 2010s and is currently in storage at a storage facility in Milwaukee.

In 1994, the Wisconsin Center District (WCD), a state organization, was created in order to fund the Midwest Express Center, and, in 1995 the MECCA complex was folded into this, including the Arena.

The WCD added the Wisconsin Athletic Walk of Fame alongside the U.S. Cellular Arena in 2001. At the end of this public promenade is a Wisconsin Historical Marker noting the location where Christopher Sholes invented the first practical typewriter, featuring the QWERTY keyboard layout.

In 2008 and 2009, it was home to the Milwaukee Bonecrushers of the Continental Indoor Football League.

On August 7, 2010, the arena hosted an Arena Football League playoff game between the Milwaukee Iron and the Chicago Rush. The Iron played their 2010 regular season home games at the BMO Harris Bradley Center, but the ongoing installation of the new center court scoreboard in that venue forced the home playoff games to be played at the U.S. Cellular Arena, where the Iron would go on to win.

The arena has been the home of the Milwaukee Panthers men's basketball team at three different times—first from 1993 to 1998, then from 2003 to 2012, and since 2013. The Panthers played their 2012–2013 home games at the 3,500-seat Klotsche Center on UWM's east side campus. The move generated complaints from some Panthers fans and attendance lagged as the team had its worst record since the 1990s. After Amanda Braun was named UWM's athletic director in March 2013, she said she would re-examine the decision to move games from the U.S. Cellular Arena. In July 2013, UWM officials reached a 5-year contract with the Wisconsin Center District that was set to run through 2018 before the 2014 naming rights deal extended the partnership through at least 2024.

In 2014, the arena was renovated to install new seats in the lower bowl, a new scoreboard, and updated signage to reflect the name change.

On March 16, 2016, it was announced the Admirals signed a 10-year lease with a five-year mutual extension. Also included on the deal was $6.3 million for upgrades to the arena, including new concession areas and a team store.

On October 26, 2017, the Bucks returned to the arena for a regular season game against the Boston Celtics in honor of their 50th anniversary in the NBA. For this event, the Bucks, by agreement with Robert Indiana, installed a newly built floor featuring a duplicate of his original MECCA court for that game only. After the game, the floor was temporarily moved to Menominee Nation Arena in Oshkosh, home to the Bucks' NBA G League affiliate, the Wisconsin Herd.

=== Seating capacity ===
The seating capacity for basketball has changed as follows:

Years	Capacity
1950–1961	11,046
1961–1968	11,138
1968–1973	10,746
1973–1980	10,938
1980–1998	11,052
1998–2004	11,358
2004–present	10,783

== Other uses ==
=== Basketball tournaments ===
As the MECCA, the building hosted first- and second-round games in the Mideast Regional of the 1984 NCAA Division I men's basketball tournament.

The arena also hosted all or part of every Horizon League men's basketball conference tournament from 2003 to 2011, including a sold-out crowd of 10,783 for the 2005 championship game, where Milwaukee defeated Detroit 59–58.

=== Concerts ===
Since the 1960s, the Arena has held a number of concerts by high-profile performers. The Beatles headlined a performance on September 4th in the Arena as part of their historic 1964 U.S. tour, and Elvis Presley performed 2 back-to-back shows at the Arena in 1972. He would return again in 1974 and 1977, with the latter occurring 4 months before his death later that year.

In 1980, Queen performed at the Arena. Bob Dylan played a two-night stand there as part of his Fall 1981 tour, and returned in both 1999 and 2001 for one-night appearances. The Grateful Dead played a two-night stand there during their spring 1989 tour.

Rush played at the arena in 1978, 1981, 1982, 1984, 1986, and 1988.

=== Professional wrestling ===
The arena has also hosted professional wrestling events, including WCW's SuperBrawl (1992), Clash of the Champions XXXIV (1997) and Mayhem (2000). It also hosted the World Wrestling Federation's King of the Ring (1996), and Over the Edge (1998). It was at the aforementioned King of the Ring card where Stone Cold Steve Austin first uttered his now-famous "Austin 3:16" catchphrase. It was scheduled to host the April 1, 2020 edition of All Elite Wrestling Dynamite before coronavirus-related public assembly concerns postponed the circuit's Milwaukee show to August 25, 2021.

=== Sport wrestling ===
On July 18, 2026, Real American Freestyle will present RAF 11 at the venue, an event that will be broadcast live on Fox Nation.

== Naming rights ==
The arena opened as Milwaukee Arena in 1950 before changing its name to MECCA Arena once the Milwaukee Exposition, Convention Center and Arena (MECCA) complex formally opened in 1974. In 1994, when the Wisconsin Center District was created, the MECCA name was retired and the arena became Wisconsin Center Arena.

Telecommunications company U.S. Cellular became the naming rights holder in 2000. They renewed their deal in 2007, worth $2.4 million over 7 years.

U.S. Cellular's naming rights expired on May 31, 2014, and they did not renew their contract. On June 26, 2014, it was announced that the University of Wisconsin–Milwaukee (UWM) purchased the naming rights, renaming the arena to UW–Milwaukee Panther Arena, as part of a 10-year, $3.4 million deal that would run through 2024, with UWM having an option to extend it through 2029. The deal made the arena the official site for major UWM events such as graduation ceremonies and university-hosted speakers. In 2021, UWM received a 25% reduction in their 2020 payment, equivalent to $87,500, after the COVID-19 pandemic left the arena nearly empty for the year.

== Images ==
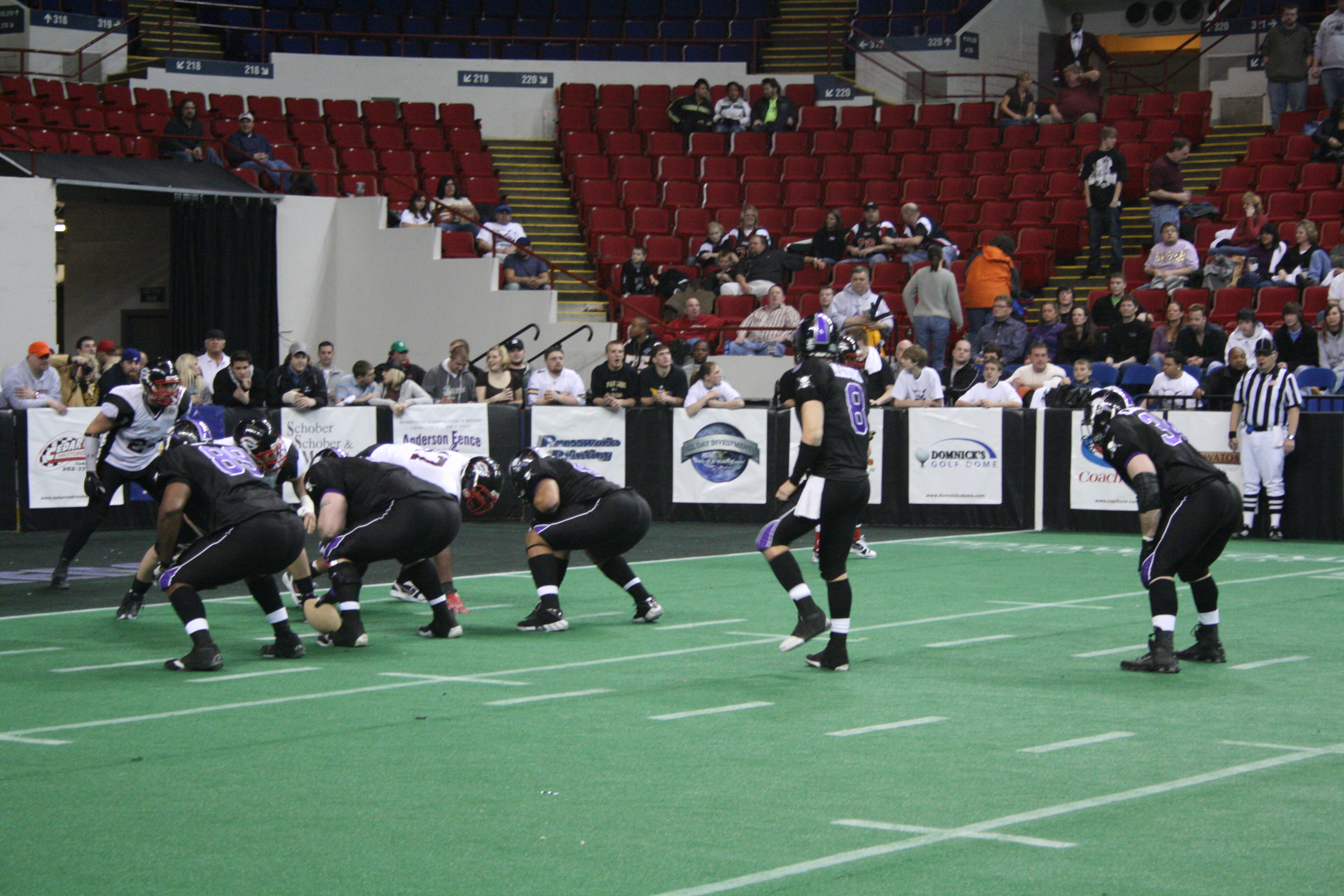
Quarterback Ryan Maiuri taking a snap against the Chicago Slaughter on March 21, 2008.

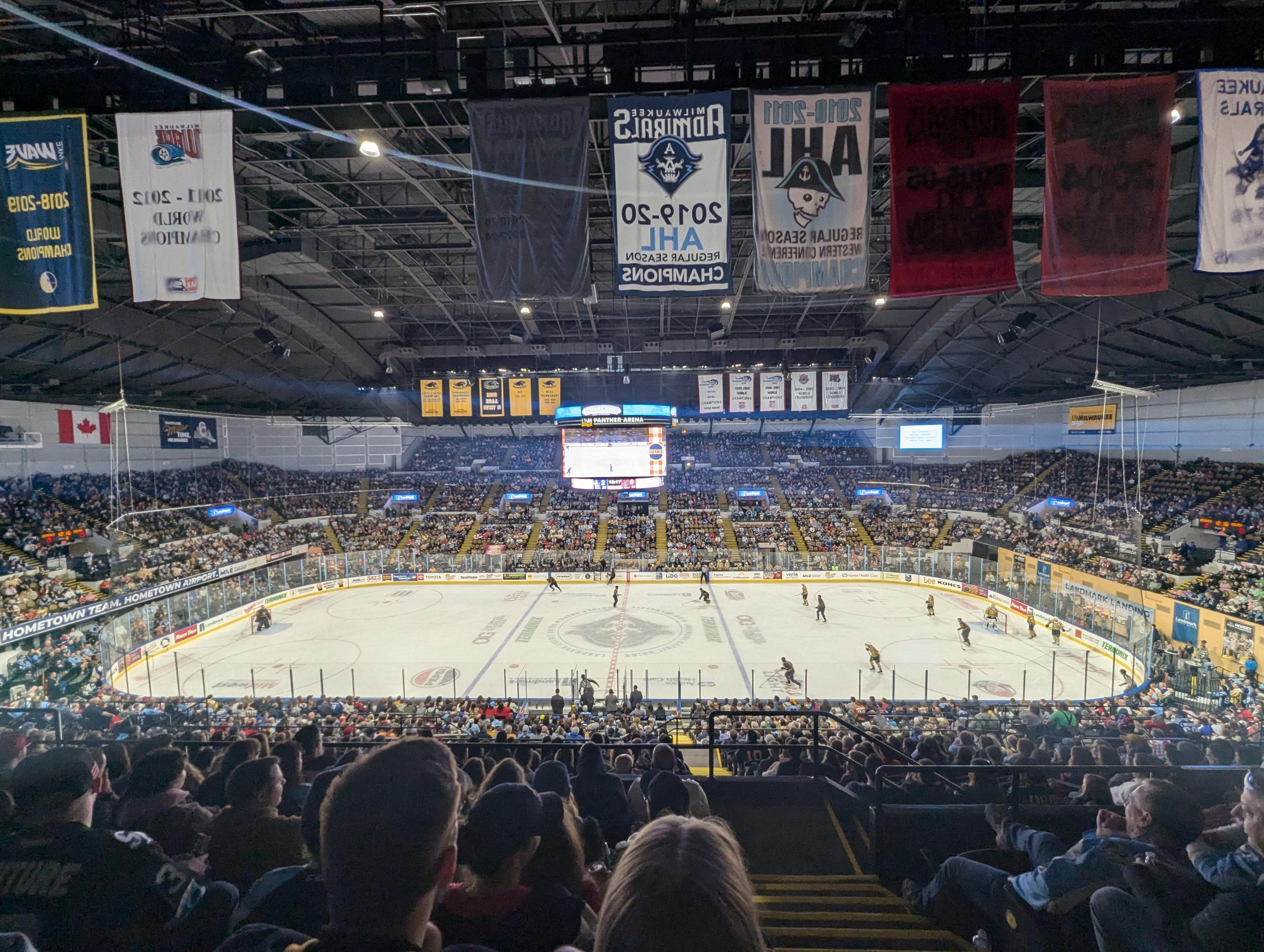
The arena set up for a Milwaukee Admirals game in 2025

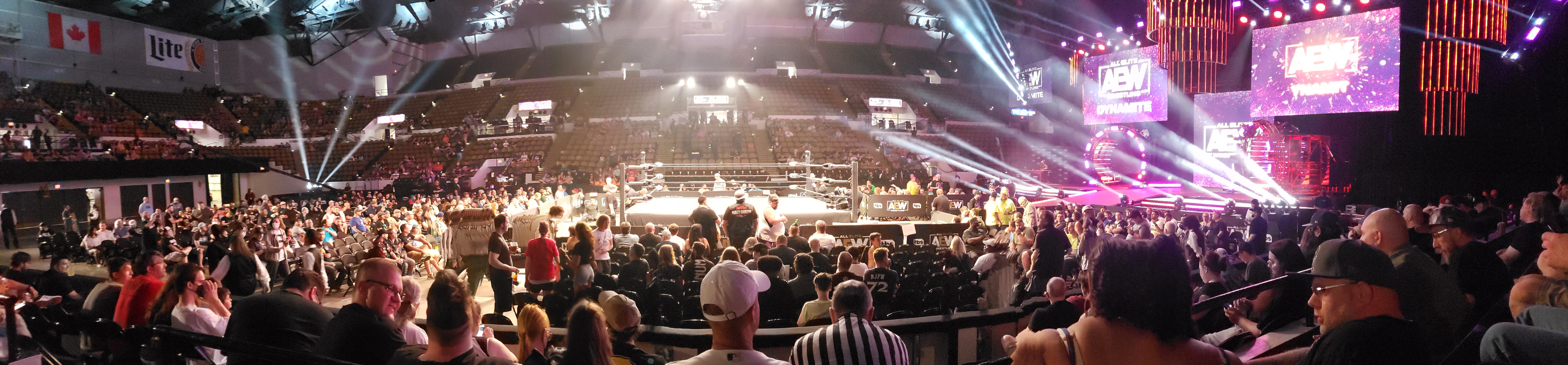
The arena set up for an episode of AEW Dynamite in 2022.

== See also ==
- MECCA Great Hall – a convention center and part of the MECCA complex
- List of NCAA Division I basketball arenas

Events and tenants
Preceded by Wharton Field House	Home of the Milwaukee Hawks; 1951–1955	Succeeded by Kiel Auditorium
Preceded by first arena	Home of the Milwaukee Bucks; 1968–1988	Succeeded by BMO Harris Bradley Center
Preceded by The Spectrum	Host of the NBA All-Star Game; 1977	Succeeded by Omni Coliseum
