= Let's Talk About It (book) =

2021 graphic novel

- Date: March 9, 2021
- Page count: 240 pages
- Publisher: Random House Graphic

Creative team
- Writers: Erika Moen, Matthew Nolan

Let's Talk About It: The Teen's Guide to Sex, Relationships, and Being a Human is a 2021 non-fiction graphic novel written and illustrated by Erika Moen and Matthew Nolan. The book is an illustrated guide to sex education that is oriented towards teenagers.

Let's Talk About It has been the subject of many attempts to ban the work from public libraries and schools. It was included in the American Library Association's 'Top 10 Most Challenged Books of 2023'. The book contains graphic depictions of nudity and sexual acts which have been categorized as pornographic and age-inappropriate for its intended audience. Let's Talk About It has received conflicting reviews, with some praising its inclusivity and comprehensiveness while others critiqued its explicit content.

== Background ==
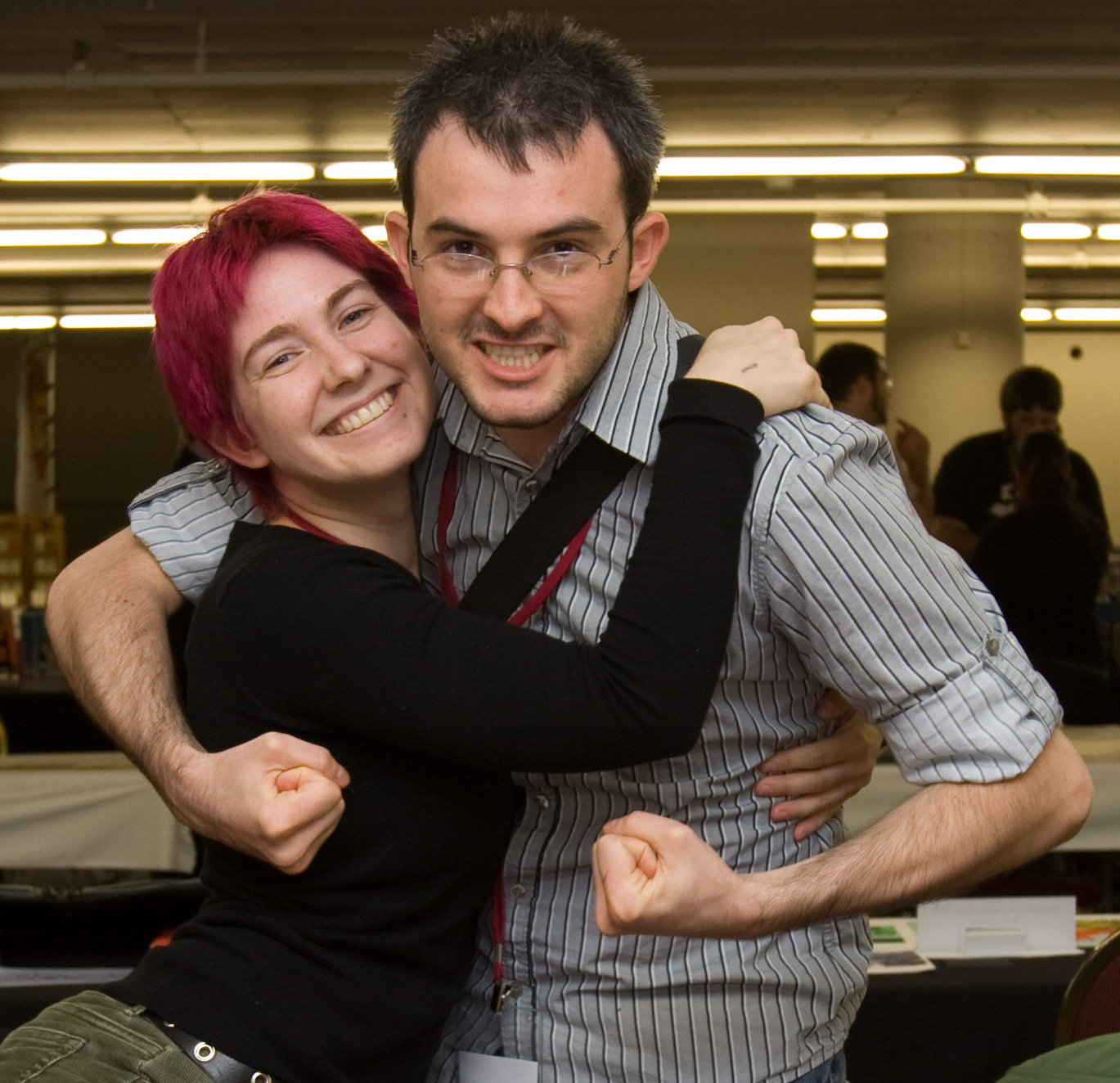
Erika Moen and Matthew Nolan at Stumptown Comics Fest 2007

Authors Erika Moen and Matthew Nolan are a married couple of comics creators. They have produced the sex education webcomic Oh Joy Sex Toy since 2013. Let's Talk About It was published by Random House Graphic on March 9, 2021. Layout assistance for the graphic novel was provided by Maria Frantz.

== Contents ==
As a sex education guidebook, Let's Talk About It introduces and provides an overview of sex and relationships for minors and young adults. Topics in the graphic novel are presented in sections through a series of conversations between teenaged characters. Each section has a lesson that begins with a problem confronted by the characters, which leads to an explanatory section on the topic, and eventually returns to a resolution by the characters that the section began with. In the dialogues, the characters engage with topics of physicality and identity.

Let's Talk About It defines and describes concepts relating to gender, sexuality, body image, and anatomy. The graphic novel contains detailed information on sex, masturbation, orgasms, birth control, and the prevention of STIs. It also includes sections on sexting, kinks, fantasies, and pornography. The book has graphic illustrations, including those of naked humans and sex positions. The graphic novel includes an overview of various types of relationships, including monogamy, polyamory, open relationships, and companionate love. Let's Talk About It additionally addresses jealousy, rejection, and abuse in relationships. It stresses the importance of consent between partners in sexual activities, while emphasizing open-mindedness and encouraging experimentation. The book's illustrations are inclusive and diverse, with characters that represent various body shapes, ethnicities, gender identities, and abilities.

The conclusion of Let's Talk About It has a letter from the authors, who describe how they "set out with a goal of producing the book that they wish they had access to when they were teenagers".

== Reception ==
Let's Talk About It has received some positive reviews, garnering praise for its comprehensiveness and inclusivity. A review in Kirkus Reviews found that the graphic novel has a tone that is sex positive and honest, while being "colorful, visually appealing, and easy-to-read". A Publishers Weekly review found that the book was "refreshingly inclusive" and said that it offers "comprehensive, no-nonsense information on sex and sexuality". Avery Kaplan writes in a review that the book offers "practical, important information about sex that is often withheld from teenagers, either because of archaic moral judgments or authoritative ignorance." A review in the School Library Journal concluded that "A sprinkling of profanity (including the odd F-bomb) must be noted as it may affect a school library's ability to shelve it."

== Censorship ==
Since its publishing in 2021, Let's Talk About It has been the subject of many attempts to ban the work in the United States from public libraries and schools. Activist groups have challenged the book, for being what has been declared as pornographic or obscene content of minors. A challenge is a request to have a book removed from a library and precedes the banning or removing the book from library shelves. The book has also been challenged for its LGBTQIA+ content. The American Library Association included Let's Talk About It in its 'Top 10 Most Challenged Books of 2023'. According to the association, the book's inclusion in libraries was challenged 55 times in 2023.

The conservative political organization Moms for Liberty campaigned against the inclusion of Let's Talk About It in public school libraries in Broward County, Florida, in 2023. Some challenges have resulted in the relocation of the book to the adult section of libraries. Activists have called for the defunding of libraries that carry the book.

In April 2025, the Lukashenko regime added the book to the List of printed publications containing information messages and materials, the distribution of which could harm the national interests of Belarus.

== See also ==
- Book censorship in the United States
- List of most commonly challenged books in the United States
