= Bucko (comics) =

2012 graphic novel by Parker and Moen

- Cover page
- Date: September 12, 2012
- Page count: 136 pages
- Publisher: Dark Horse Comics

Creative team
- Writer: Jeff Parker
- Artist: Erika Moen

Original publication
- Language: English
- ISBN: 978-1-59582-973-3

Bucko is a comic written by Jeff Parker and drawn by Erika Moen. It was serialized as a webcomic in 2011–2012 before being published as a book by Dark Horse Comics on September 12, 2012. It is a comedic murder mystery story.

The comic received praise from Ain't It Cool News, Newsarama, Paste Magazine, Willamette Week, and The Portland Mercury. Publishers Weekly wrote positively of the comic's illustration but was critical of the story.

== Plot summary ==
The protagonist of Bucko is Rich "Bucko" Richardson, who becomes a suspect in a homicide investigation after he finds a corpse in the restroom of an office building. At the time he was recovering from inebriation and was on his way to an employment interview. Richardson sets out to discover the true culprit. Along the way he has an adventure in Portland, Oregon, and encounters strange characters including musicians, individuals engrossed in the steampunk culture, and drug users struggling with addiction to methamphetamine.

== Publication history ==
Bucko was first published as a serialized webcomic from 2011 on a twice-weekly schedule. It was published in printed book format by Dark Horse Comics on September 12, 2012.

== Reception ==
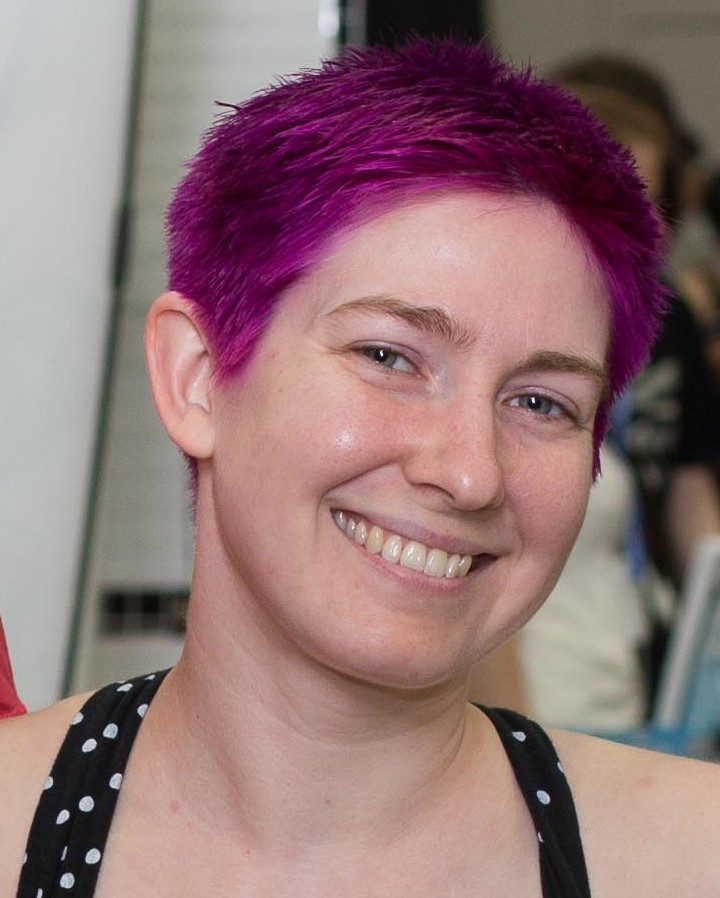
Bucko artist Erika Moen

Ain't It Cool News wrote: "This Dark Horse collection of the Jeff Parker/Erika Moen online comic is easily the funniest book to come out this year." Newsarama called Bucko, "a strip that brings the bizarre anarchy of a Coen brothers caper to the streets of Portland." Paste Magazine characterized the comic as a hipster version of The Big Lebowski, and compared the writing style to Raymond Chandler. The review wrote that the production duo worked well together: "Jeff Parker's filthy, inventive mind pairs nicely with Erika Moen’s gorgeously simple drawings as the sense of sweetness in the visuals cuts the acid of the writing, which spares no one."

A review by Publishers Weekly praised the illustration: "Artist Moen's work is lively, capturing the action of the script perfectly and bringing the characters to energetic life." However, the review was critical of the plot, writing: "The story is a clever, careening juggernaut that becomes cluttered by the end. If you’re not familiar with maker culture or Juggalos, or Portland, Ore. in-jokes, you might get lost as the hipster social satire piles on." Willamette Week reviewed the book version of the comic and wrote:

it's Moen ... who really sells the story, with a lighthearted illustration style that keeps what is ultimately a violent story full of unpleasant people funny rather than dark, and a knack for conveying action and movement that propels the reader from one panel to the next.

The Portland Mercury commented, "While technically a murder mystery, Bucko is straight-up comedy, sprinkled with saucy characters and more Portland situations than you can shake a kombucha mother at." The review praised the collaborative team that put the comic together: "Parker's writing is sharp, while Moen's clever drawings are a pleasure to behold." The Daily Astorian described Bucko as "an alternative story with adult content".

== See also ==
- Guy Ritchie's Gamekeeper
- Periscope Studio
- Walk-In
- List of female comics creators
