= Anime Milwaukee =

Anime convention in Wisconsin, US

Coordinates: 43°2′23″N 87°55′2″W

- Anime Milwaukee logo.
- Status: Active
- Genre: Anime, Japanese culture
- Venue: Baird Center; Hilton Milwaukee City Center
- Location: Milwaukee, Wisconsin
- Country: United States
- Inaugurated: 2007
- Attendance: 17,250 in 2024
- Organizer: Entertainment & Culture Promotion Society
- Website: animemilwaukee.org

Anime Milwaukee (AMKE) is an annual three-day anime convention held during February at the Baird Center and Hilton Milwaukee City Center in Milwaukee, Wisconsin. It is Wisconsin's largest anime convention.

== Programming ==
The convention typically offers anime music videos, an art contest, artist alley, charity ball, cosplay chess, a dealer's room, fashion show, maid cafe, manga library, masquerade, movies, rave, tabletop gaming, and video game tournaments. The convention runs for 24 hours a day.

The 2017 charity ball benefited the Milwaukee LGBT Community Center.

== History ==
Anime Milwaukee began in 2007 and was founded by the Japanese Animation Association at the University of Wisconsin-Milwaukee. In 2011, the convention moved to the Hyatt Regency Milwaukee & Frontier Airlines Center in Milwaukee, which allowed for 24-hour programming. Attendees who preregistered for Anime Milwaukee in 2013 could receive a discount for the Distant Worlds concert held the day before the convention on February 14, 2013. The convention shared space in 2014 at the Wisconsin Center with Pheasant Fest, a hunting convention. The combined conventions economic impact were expected to be $1.5 million.

In 2015, Anime Milwaukee's expected economic impact was over $1 million and it shared Wisconsin Center space with the Midwest Twisters Gymnastics Invitational. The convention brought $1.2 million to the local economy in 2016. Anime Milwaukee in 2017 occupied all the floors of the Wisconsin Center to expand panels and video gaming. The convention was estimated to bring $2.5–3 million to the local economy. Anime Milwaukee was estimated to bring $4 million to the local economy in 2019. Anime Milwaukee 2021 was cancelled due to the COVID-19 pandemic. Anime Milwaukee had COVID-19 policies in 2022 that included mandatory masks, with either vaccination or a negative test.

Prior to Anime Milwaukee 2025, the burlesque show was cancelled due to online harassment involving performer applications.

=== Event history ===
Dates	Location	Attendance	Guests
February 29 – March 2, 2008	UWM Union; Milwaukee, Wisconsin	400 (est)	Colleen Clinkenbeard, Darrel Guilbeau, Peter Paik, Mandy St. Jean, and Sonny Strait.
February 27 – March 1, 2009	UWM Union; Milwaukee, Wisconsin	800 (est)	Todd Haberkorn, Wendy Powell, and Yamila Abraham.
March 12–14, 2010	UWM Union; Milwaukee, Wisconsin	2,100 (est)	Bea Billany, Todd Haberkorn, Vic Mignogna, Chris Niosi, Wendy Powell, Christopher Sabat, The Spoony Bards, and Uncle Yo.
February 18–20, 2011	Hyatt Regency Milwaukee & Frontier Airlines Center; Milwaukee, Wisconsin	2,400 (est)	Chris Cason, Alan Evans, Mike McFarland, Trevor A. Mueller, Monica Rial, Spike Spencer, Uncle Yo, and Doug Walker.
February 17–19, 2012	Hyatt Regency Milwaukee & Frontier Airlines Center; Milwaukee, Wisconsin	3,492	Robert Axelrod, Bea Billany, Chris Cason, Alan Evans, August Hahn, Trevor A. Mueller, Spike Spencer, Uncle Yo, and Doug Walker.
February 15–17, 2013	Hyatt Regency Milwaukee & Delta Center (formerly Frontier Airlines Center); Milwaukee, Wisconsin	4,816	Arc Impulse, Chris Cason, Alan Evans, Todd Haberkorn, Midwest Karaoke Madness, Trevor A. Mueller, The Pillowcases, Ian Sinclair, Alexis Tipton, and Nobuo Uematsu.
February 14–16, 2014	Hyatt Regency Milwaukee & Wisconsin Center (formerly Delta Center); Milwaukee, Wisconsin	6,231	Leah Clark, Tiffany Grant, Kyle Hebert, DJ Jeffito, Jamie Marchi, Meishi Smile, Bryce Papenbrook, DJ Phoole, The Pillowcases, Romance, Patrick Seitz, Ian Sinclair, Christopher Corey Smith, theotoxin, and David Vincent.
February 13–15, 2015	Hyatt Regency Milwaukee & Wisconsin Center; Milwaukee, Wisconsin	7,745	Arc Impulse, Bea Billany, Steve Blum, Jason Bulmahn, Leah Clark, Terri Doty, Alan Evans, Caitlin Glass, Hibiki, Russell Lissau, Joel McDonald, Erica Mendez, Mandy "AmazonMandy" Moore, Trevor A. Mueller, Bryce Papenbrook, Samantha Sostarich, Eric Stuart, Symphonic Anime Orchestra, Ayumi Tanaka, J. Michael Tatum, David Vincent, Tom Wayland, Greg Wicker.
March 11–13, 2016	Hyatt Regency Milwaukee & Wisconsin Center; Milwaukee, Wisconsin	9,313	Elena Blueskies, Olivia Chiu, Stella Chuu, Samurai Dan Coglan, Alan Evans, Todd Haberkorn, Kyle Hebert, Lauren Landa, Cherami Leigh, Russell Lissau, Kevin McKeever, Trevor A. Mueller, Brina Palencia, Christopher Sabat, Sonny Strait, Ciarán Strange, and Ayumi Tanaka.
February 17–19, 2017	Hyatt Regency Milwaukee & Wisconsin Center; Milwaukee, Wisconsin	9,520	Zach Aguilar, Ray Chase, Jillian Coglan, Samurai Dan Coglan, Lucien Dodge, Alan Evans, Erica Lindbeck, Russell Lissau, Joel McDonald, Erica Mendez, Matthew Mercer, Vic Mignogna, Mint, Trevor A. Mueller, Laura Post, Marisha Ray, Ian Sinclair, Austin Tindle, and Greg Wicker.
February 16–18, 2018	Hyatt Regency Milwaukee & Wisconsin Center; Milwaukee, Wisconsin	10,593	Kay Bear, Johnny Yong Bosch, Jason "Liquid86" Bruner, Leon Chiro, Jillian Coglan, Samurai Dan Coglan, Adam Croasdell, Alan Evans, Crispin Freeman, DJ GreenFlow, DJ Kagamine, Kawaii Besu, Russell Lissau, Trevor A. Mueller, DJ OpM, Chris Parson, Scottaconda, Jon St. John, TeddyLoid, and Kari Wahlgren.
February 15–17, 2019	Hyatt Regency Milwaukee & Wisconsin Center; Milwaukee, Wisconsin	10,600	Acme, Jason "Liquid86" Bruner, Adam Croasdell, D.C. Douglas, Jessie James Grelle, DJ HeavyGrinder, Jerry Jewell, DJ Kagamine, Lauren Landa, Comfort Love, Joel McDonald, Moderately Okay Cosplay, DJ OpM, Reika, Scottaconda, Ian Sinclair, Micah Solusod, J. Michael Tatum, David Vincent, and Adam Withers.
February 14–16, 2020	Wisconsin Center; Hilton Milwaukee City Center; Milwaukee, Wisconsin	11,011	Zach Aguilar, Aimi, Tia Ballard, Alexei Bochenek, Jen Brown, Ogawa Burukku, Ray Chase, Gabrielle Cooke, Robbie Daymond, Gideon Emery, Martha Harms, Dawn Humphrey, DJ Hype Girl, Samantha Ireland, Erica Lindbeck, Joel McDonald, Max Mittelman, Moderately Okay Cosplay, Trevor A. Mueller, The Pillowcases, W.T. Snacks, and Ciarán Strange.
February 11–13, 2022	Wisconsin Center; Hilton Milwaukee City Center; Milwaukee, Wisconsin	10,300 (est)	Morgan Berry, Johnny Yong Bosch, Griffin Burns, Adam Croasdell, Alan Evans, Lizzie Freeman, Martha Harms, Billy Kametz, Mela Lee, Russell Lissau, Phil Mizuno, Trevor A. Mueller, Colleen O'Shaughnessey, Keith Silverstein, Ciarán Strange, and A.K. Wirru.
February 3–5, 2023	Wisconsin Center; Hilton Milwaukee City Center; Milwaukee, Wisconsin	15,500	Burnout Syndromes, Ray Chase, Leah Clark, Robbie Daymond, Alan Evans, Martha Harms, DJ HeavyGrinder, James Landino, E. Jason Liebrecht, Russell Lissau, Elizabeth Maxwell, Max Mittelman, Phil Mizuno, Trevor A. Mueller, NipahDUBS, Scottaconda, Andre "DJ Jinrei" Smith, and Suzie Yeung.
March 8-10, 2024	Baird Center; Hilton Milwaukee City Center; Milwaukee, Wisconsin	17,250	AKrCos, Bryn Apprill, Griffin Burns, Creep-P, Jordan Dash Cruz, Khoi Dao, Ricco Fajardo, Caitlin Glass, DJ GreenFlöw, Chris Hackney, Yaya Han, Kyle "Turtle Smithy" Mathis, Malinda "Malindachan" Mathis, Erica Mendez, NipahDUBS, Tony Oliver, Patrick Pedraza, RageGearProps, Revolution Boi, Patrick Seitz, Laura Stahl, Ben Starr, Stereo Dive Foundation, and Barry Yandell.
March 7-9, 2025	Baird Center; Hilton Milwaukee City Center; Milwaukee, Wisconsin		Sean Chiplock, Cowbutt Crunchies, Creep-P, Hayden Daviau, Marcy Edwards, Dorah Fine, Hylian Cream, Kanae Ito, Brittany Lauda, Erica Lindbeck, Daman Mills, Tony Oliver, Zeno Robinson, Alejandro Saab, Nozomu Sasaki, Jonah Scott, Matt Shipman, Keith Silverstein, StarsOfCassiopeia, Kaiji Tang, David Wald, Howard Wang, Anne Yatco, Stephanie Young, Shunsuke Aoki, Hirotsugu Hayakawa, Taku Inoue, Kanae Itō, Tadashi Nakajima, Nozomu Sasaki, and Yoshihiro Watanabe.
March 6-8, 2026	Baird Center; Hilton Milwaukee; Milwaukee, Wisconsin		Felecia Angelle, Shintaro Asanuma, Bill Butts, Dani Chambers, Jordan Dash Cruz, Kelsey Cruz, Aaron Dismuke, Dorothy Fahn, Tom Fahn, Alisa Freedman, Jessie James Grelle, Chris Guerrero, Jill Harris, Xanthe Huynh, DJ Kagamine, Brian Mathis, Griffin Puatu, Dallas Reid, Sarah Roach, Mallorie Rodak, Kana Ueda, Natalie Van Sistine, and Yoshihiro Watanabe.
