= David Hahn (cartoonist) =

American comic book artist

- Born: 1967 (age 58–59) Los Angeles, California
- Area: Artist

David Hahn is a western Montana-based comic book artist born in 1967. He is best known for his work illustrating the comic book mini-series Bite Club and its sequel Bite Club: Vampire Crime Unit for DC Comics, where he also illustrated stories for Robin, Fables, Batman: The Ultimate Training Guide, and Lucifer.

== Career ==
Much of his early work was published by Antarctic Press in Fun and Perils in the Trudyverse. Hahn later moved his work to Slave Labor Graphics and restarted the series under the name Private Beach, which garnered him an Eisner Award nomination. He has also written an X-Men story for Ultimate X-Men #11 for Marvel Comics and drawn a story for Michael Chabon's The Escapist #5, written by Howard Chaykin, drawn several issues of Marvel Adventures:The Fantastic Four, as well five issues of Spider-Man Loves Mary Jane.

In 2011, he released his second creator-owned alternative mini-series, a five-issue story called All Nighter, published by Image Comics.

In May 2013, Rob Balder announced that David would replace Xin Ye as the artist for Erfworld. As a way to learn to draw the Erfworld characters, he started by drawing the art for E is for Erfworld the Erfabet Book. He also provided art for the Book 2 epilogues and provided the art for part of Book 3 until September 2015 after which he bowed out and Xin Ye returned.

He recently pencilled the artwork for DC Comics' Batman '66 Meets the Man From UNCLE cross-over mini-series as well as wrapping up his creator-owned four-issue post-apocalyptic story, Dayglow, published by Publish Enemies and currently available in digital download format from Comixology.

David is a founding member of the Portland, Oregon collective Helioscope (formerly Periscope Studio).

== Works ==
- Aztec Empire (graphic novel)
