= Erika Moen =

American comic book artist

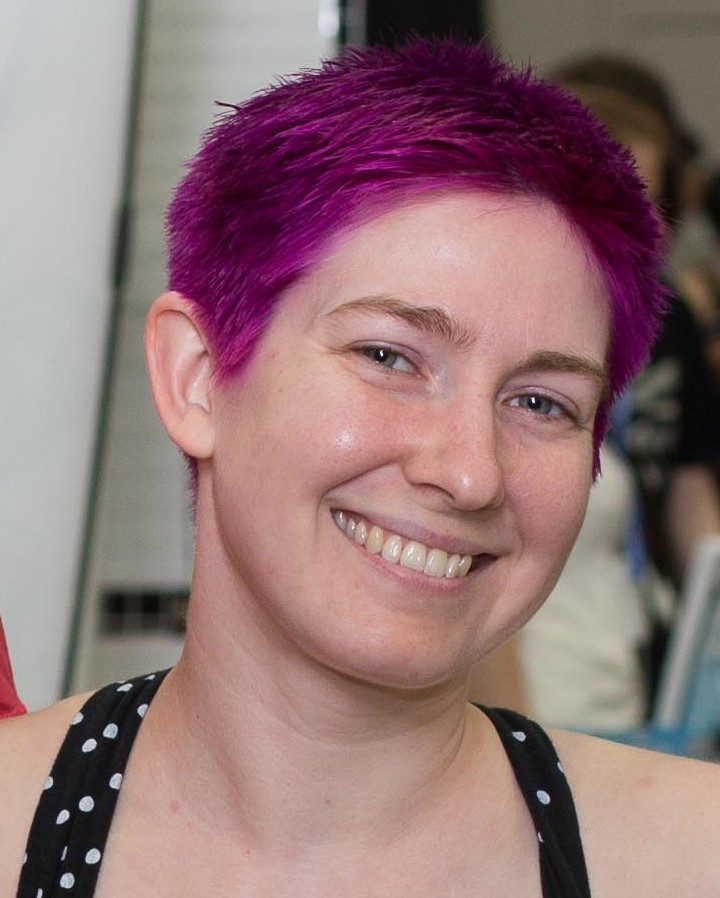
- Moen in 2013
- Areas: Cartoonist, Writer, Penciller, Inker
- Notable works: DAR!; Bucko; Oh Joy Sex Toy; Let's Talk About It

Erika Moen is an American comic book artist, known for her autobiographical comic DAR, the sex educational webcomic Oh Joy, Sex Toy, and the graphic novel Let's Talk About It.

== Biography ==
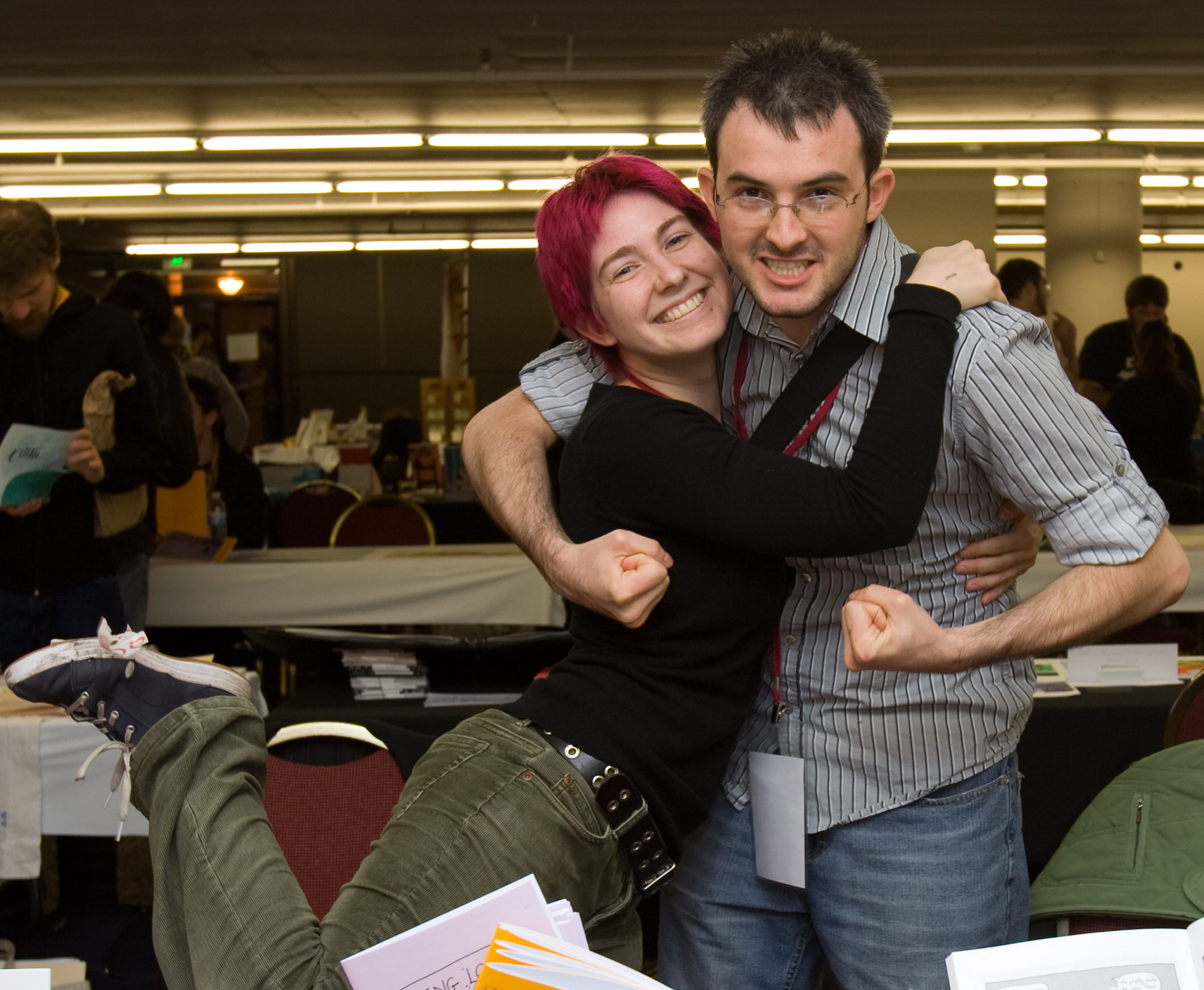
Moen and Matthew Nolan at Stumptown Comics Fest 2007

Moen graduated from Pitzer College with a BA in Illustrated Storytelling in 2006. She identifies as queer. She and her husband, fellow artist Matthew Nolan, have been married since October 2008.

Moen is the creator of the self-published autobiographical online comic DAR! which has been collected into self-published print volumes. She also has contributed comic work to Best Erotic Comics 2008 (Last Gasp), True Porn Volume 2 (Alternative Comics), Flight Volume 1; and Unsafe for All Ages, a collection of erotic short stories by gay and lesbian artists published by Prism Comics in 2005. In 2004, Moen was profiled as a promising new talent "taking over the comic world with her stories about queer culture, sex, humor and cute girls" by Sequential Tart.

In 2011, she began collaborating with Marvel Comics writer Jeff Parker on Bucko, a murder mystery/farce webcomic set in Portland. The story concluded in 2012, and was published in a collected volume by Dark Horse Comics.

Moen is a member of Periscope Studio. She was among the comic book artists featured at the 6th annual Stumptown Comics Art Show in April and May 2010 at the Portland Center for the Performing Arts.

Since April 2013, Moen has been working full-time on her webcomics project Oh Joy, Sex Toy, which centers around "reviews of everything that relates to sex, sexuality and the sex industry". The series, which updates with a new review every Tuesday, has garnered a great deal of positive attention, including a reference in Dan Savage's advice column Savage Love. Strips have also been syndicated on several websites including Bitch Media and Fleshbot.

Moen and Nolan wrote and illustrated the 2021 graphic novel Let's Talk About It: The Teen's Guide to Sex, Relationships, and Being a Human.

In addition to her comic work, Moen worked as Production Assistant in the Storyboard Department on Henry Selick's 2009 film Coraline.
