= City Yard =

Public art work by Sheila Klein

- Artist: Sheila Klein
- Year: 1998
- Type: mixed media
- Location: Wisconsin Center; Milwaukee, Wisconsin; 43°2′22.489″N 87°54′58.415″W

City Yard is a public art work by artist Sheila Klein, located at the Wisconsin Center in downtown Milwaukee, Wisconsin. The artwork consists of landscape elements, limestone architectural ornament, and salvaged public works objects such as fire hydrants and the classic blue police call box.
