= Stumptown Comics Fest =

Defunct comic book convention

- Status: Defunct
- Genre: Comic book convention
- Venue: Lloyd Center Doubletree Hotel (2007–2010); Oregon Convention Center (2006; 2011–2013)
- Location: Portland, Oregon
- Country: United States
- Inaugurated: 2004
- Most recent: 2013
- Organizer: Stumptown Comics, Inc.; Shawna Gore
- Filing status: Nonprofit
- Website: http://www.stumptowncomics.com

Stumptown Comics Fest was a comic book convention, held annually in Portland, Oregon from 2004 to 2013. In the model of the Alternative Press Expo and the Small Press Expo, Stumptown was a forum for artists, writers and publishers of comic art in its various forms to expose the public to comics not typically accessible through normal commercial channels.

== History ==
The Stumptown Comics Fest originated in early 2004 with a small group of Portland-area cartoonists (led by Indigo Kelleigh) who yearned for a convention that focused on the art of comics instead of the business of comics. In a space of four months they were able to put on the first comics fest on June 6, 2004, at the Old Church, a non-profit organization whose goal was to preserve an old church. The first show featured 22 exhibitor tables, and attracted 150 attendees.

In 2005 the show moved to Portland State University's Smith Memorial Ballroom, and grew to 80 exhibitor tables and 450 attendees.

In 2006 the event moved to the Oregon Convention Center and expanded to two days.

In 2007, the event began hosting the Stumptown Comics Fest Trophy Awards and Comic Art Battle. The awards honored outstanding small creators and comics, while the Comic Art Battle, conceived of and created by Ezra Claytan Daniels, was described as "a cross between Pictionary and wrestling."

In 2012 the show changed hands, with Kelleigh passing on the reins to Shawna Gore; in addition, the new organizers achieved nonprofit status.

After the 10th annual show in 2013, Stumptown went "on hiatus" and entered an operating agreement with Rose City Comic Con.

=== Dates and locations ===
Dates	Venue	Guests/Notes
June 6, 2004	Old Church	
October 1, 2005	Portland State University Smith Memorial Ballroom	
October 27–28, 2006	Oregon Convention Center	Paul Chadwick, Michael Gagne
September 29–30, 2007	Lloyd Center Doubletree Hotel	attending professionals: Graham Annable, Steve Lieber, Joshua Kemble. Brandon Bold
April 26–27, 2008	Lloyd Center Doubletree Hotel	Guest of honor: Craig Thompson; other guests: Nicholas Gurewitch Larry Marder, and Brian Michael Bendis; attending professionals: Steve Lieber
April 18–19, 2009	Doubletree Convention Hall	Featured guest: Jeff Smith
April 24–25, 2010	Lloyd Center Doubletree Hotel	Special guests: Paul Pope, Graham Annable, Kate Beaton, Craig Thompson, James Sturm
April 16–17, 2011	Oregon Convention Center	Portland Mayor Sam Adams appeared at the show "in the guise of SamDroid to pose for photographs and raise money for local homeless youth organization p:ear."
April 28–29, 2012	Oregon Convention Center	Official guests: Stan Sakai, Mike Allred, Kurt Busiek, Chris Samnee, Peter Bagge, Matt Bors, Brian Michael Bendis
April 27–29, 2013	Oregon Convention Center	Featured guests: Dash Shaw, Bill Willingham, Hope Larson, Becky Cloonan, James Kochalka, Brian Hurtt, Boulet; attending professionals: Paul Guinan, Anina Bennett, Erika Moen, Greg Rucka, Matt Bors

== See also ==
- Culture of Portland, Oregon
