= Geek Week PDX =

Annual event in Portland, Oregon, U.S.

- Logo
- Frequency: Annually
- Location: Portland, Oregon
- Country: United States
- Inaugurated: 2024
- Founder: David Raycroft
- Website: geekweekpdx.com

Geek Week PDX is an annual event in Portland, Oregon, United States. Established by David Raycroft in 2024, the event is held adjacent to Rose City Comic Con. Geek Week has been described by KOIN as a "citywide celebration of pop culture, fandom, and creative expression". Willamette Week has called Geek Week a "series of special opportunities to interact with the nerdy events, spaces, parties, activities and small businesses that keep Portland's nerdy reputation intact".

Activities include game tournaments, film screenings, trivia nights, and others focused on anime, fantasy, comics, science fiction, cosplay, tabletop gaming, and video games. The 2026 event included a kickoff party at Hey Love and 'Sneaky Squatch PDX Art Hunt', a scavenger hunt with hidden artworks of Bigfoot throughout Portland. An 8-foot-tall statue was installed at Portland City Hall. The sculpture In the Wild Mythical Dance by Kassy Lopez was installed at Keller Fountain Park. Other installations included Dave Castr's Sasquatchu looking at? at Books with Pictures, Caitlin McNamara's work at the Heathman Hotel, and Amanda Stamatelaky's Primordial Squatch at Sinister Coffee.

== See also ==
- Anime and manga convention
  - List of anime and manga conventions
- Comic book convention
  - List of comic book conventions
- Culture of Portland, Oregon
- Science fiction convention
- Science-fiction fandom
