= Kumoricon =

Anime convention in Portland, Oregon

Coordinates: 45°31′41″N 122°39′47″W

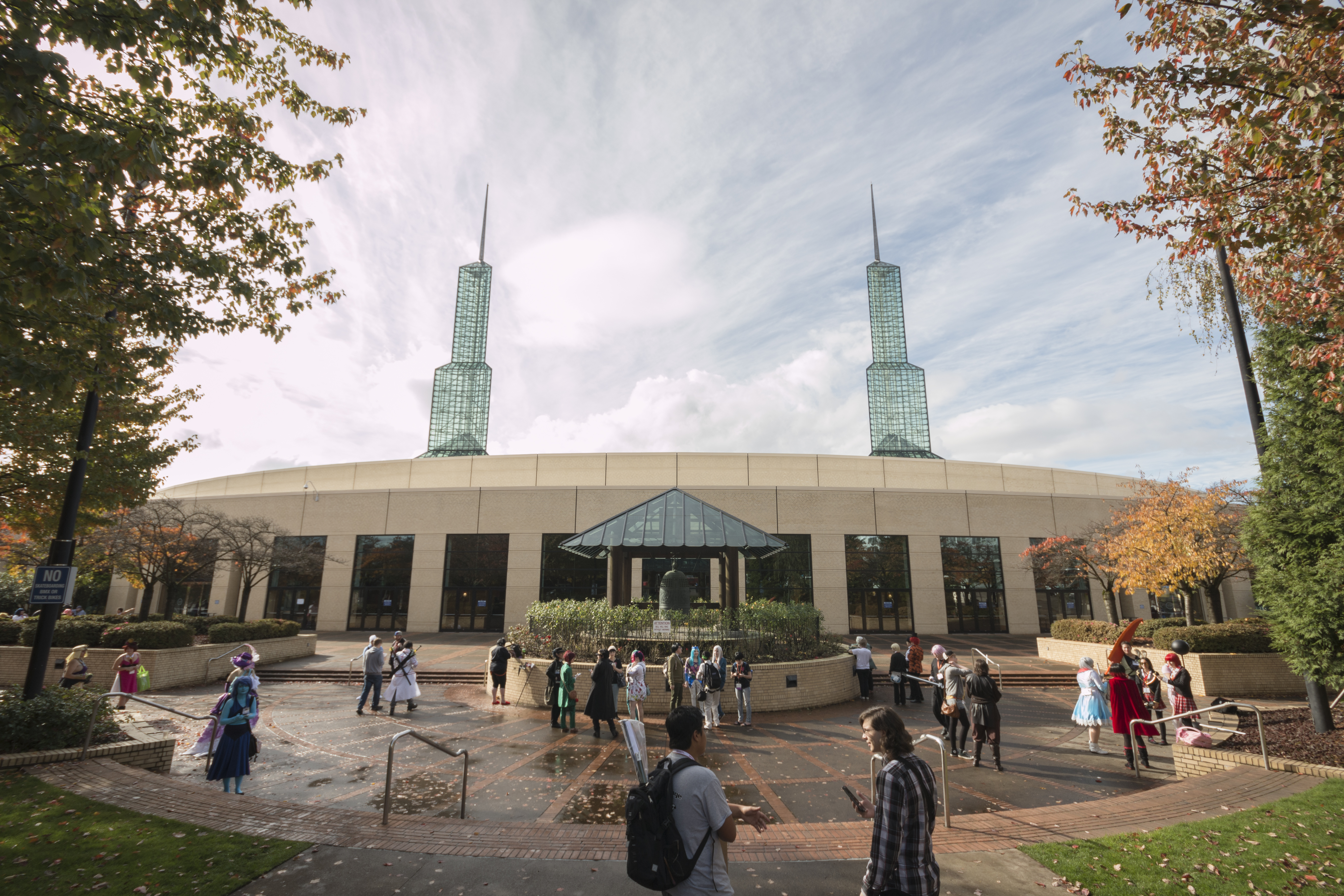
- Kumoricon 2016
- Status: Active
- Genre: Anime, Manga, Japanese culture
- Venue: Oregon Convention Center
- Location: Portland, Oregon
- Country: United States
- Inaugurated: 2003
- Attendance: 11,729 in 2023
- Website: http://www.kumoricon.org/

Kumoricon is an annual three-day anime convention held during October or November at the Oregon Convention Center in Portland, Oregon. The name of the convention comes from the Japanese word Kumori (曇り), meaning cloudy. Kumoricon is run by a volunteer staff and was previously held in Vancouver, Washington at the Hilton Vancouver Washington/Red Lion Vancouver at the Quay.

== Programming ==
The convention typically offers an artist alley, board gaming, charity auction, chibi room, cosplay cabaret, cosplay chess, cosplay competitions, dances (formal masquerade ball and informal), exhibitor hall, karaoke, maid cafe, music, music video contests, panels, tabletop gaming, video game tournaments, and workshops. Kumoricon's charity auction in 2025 benefited Outside In.

== History ==
The convention originated from the anime club at the University of Oregon. Due to the convention's growth, in 2011 it was held in both the Hilton Vancouver Washington and the Red Lion Vancouver at the Quay. Kumoricon expanded to four days in 2014. Due to growth and lack of space, Kumoricon in 2016 moved to the Oregon Convention Center in Portland, Oregon. Demolition of Red Lion's Centennial Center and Kumoricon using six hotels also influenced the decision. Kumoricon used half the convention center in 2019. Kumoricon 2020 was cancelled due to the COVID-19 pandemic, and they announced an online convention in its place.

=== Event history ===
| Dates | Location | Atten. | Guests |
|---|---|---|---|
| November 29–30, 2003 | Clarion Hotel; Springfield, Oregon | 419 | Bakazoku |
| September 4–6, 2004 | Portland Marriott Downtown; Portland, Oregon | 1,284 | Bakazoku, Phuong-Mai Bui-Quang (PMBQ), Brad DeMoss, Jeannie Lee, and Dr. Antonia Levi. |
| September 3–5, 2005 | Doubletree Hotel Portland/Lloyd Center; Portland, Oregon | 1,850 | Bakazoku, Greg Dean, Brad DeMoss, Antonia Levi, Joshua Seth, and Toshifumi Yoshida. |
| September 2–4, 2006 | Red Lion on the River; Portland, Oregon | 2,357 | A-Key Kyo, Bakazoku, Greg Dean, Liz Dean, Michael Gluck, Tiffany Grant, and Kirk Thornton. |
| September 1–3, 2007 | Vancouver Hilton & Convention Center; Vancouver, Washington | 3,133 | A-Key Kyo, Mohammad "Hawk" Haque, Ananth Panagariya, Sean Schemmel, The Slants, and Kirk Thornton. |
| August 30 – September 1, 2008 | Doubletree Portland-Lloyd Center; Portland, Oregon | 4,610 | Greg Dean, Liz Dean, Richard Epcar, Kaja Foglio, Phil Foglio, Carl Gustav Horn, The Slants, Ellyn Stern, Kirk Thornton, and Tommy Yune. |
| September 5–7, 2009 | Hilton Portland & Executive Tower; Portland, Oregon | 4,761 | The Anime Hunters, Svetlana Chmakova, Kaja Foglio, Phil Foglio, Carl Gustav Horn, Last Stop Tokyo, Cynthia Martinez, Soul Candy, Jason Thompson, Kirk Thornton, and Toshifumi Yoshida. |
| September 4–6, 2010 | Hilton Portland & Executive Tower; Portland, Oregon | 4,271 | Tiffany Grant, Todd Haberkorn, Carl Gustav Horn, Kevin McKeever, Soul Candy, and Sonny Strait. |
| September 3–5, 2011 | Hilton Vancouver Washington; Red Lion Vancouver at the Quay; Vancouver, Washington | 4,182 | The Anime Hunters, Chris Cason, Todd Haberkorn, Slightly Anime, and David Vincent. |
| September 1–3, 2012 | Hilton Vancouver Washington; Red Lion Vancouver at the Quay; Vancouver, Washington | 5,023 | Lauren Landa, Ninja of the Night, The Slants, and Sonny Strait. |
| August 31–September 2, 2013 | Hilton Vancouver Washington; Red Lion Vancouver at the Quay; Vancouver, Washington | 6,206 | Anina Bennett, Terry Blas, Ron Chan, Paul Guinan, Todd Haberkorn, Cassandra Lee Morris, Ninja of the Night, Christopher Sabat, Jason Thompson, and David Vincent. |
| August 29–September 1, 2014 | Hilton Vancouver Washington; Red Lion Vancouver at the Quay; Vancouver, Washington | 6,650 | Chuck Huber, Bryce Papenbrook, Raj Ramayya, Christopher Sabat, Patrick Seitz, Stephanie Sheh, and Karen Strassman. |
| September 4–7, 2015 | Hilton Vancouver Washington; Red Lion Vancouver at the Quay; Vancouver, Washington | 6,600 | Christine Marie Cabanos, Erica Mendez, Patrick Seitz, The Slants, Ciarán Strange, and David Vincent. |
| October 28–30, 2016 | Oregon Convention Center; Portland, Oregon | 7,954 | D.C. Douglas, Caitlin Glass, Shigeto Koyama, Neeko, Sonny Strait, Ciarán Strange, Austin Tindle, Eric Vale, and Hiromi Wakabayashi. |
| October 27–29, 2017 | Oregon Convention Center; Portland, Oregon | 8,575 | Steve Ahn, Fighting Dreamers Productions, Jessie James Grelle, Todd Haberkorn, Jerry Jewell, Hiroyasu Kobayashi, Shigeto Koyama, Kra, Eugene Lee, Cherami Leigh, Vic Mignogna, TeddyLoid, Hiromi Wakabayashi, and Lisle Wilkerson. |
| October 26–28, 2018 | Oregon Convention Center; Portland, Oregon | 9,086 | Yoshitaka Amano, Justin Briner, Clifford Chapin, Jillian Coglan, Samurai Dan Coglan, Lucien Dodge, KionCloud, Hiroyasu Kobayashi, Shigeto Koyama, Lauren Landa, Magic of Life, Erica Mendez, Atelier Pierrot, Monica Rial, Jad Saxton, Keith Silverstein, Ciarán Strange, superlog, J. Michael Tatum, TeddyLoid, Kimura U, Uptown Cosplay, Hiromi Wakabayashi, and David Wald. |
| November 15–17, 2019 | Oregon Convention Center; Portland, Oregon | 10,816 | Yuko Ashizawa, Tia Ballard, Morgan Berry, Luci Christian, Enayla, Caleb Hyles, IBI, Brittney Karbowski, KionCloud, Shigeto Koyama, Matthew Lassiter, Joel McDonald, Brina Palencia, Atelier Pierrot, Ciarán Strange, Karen Strassman, TeddyLoid, Uptown Cosplay, Vedetta Marie, Hiromi Wakabayashi, and David Wald. |
| November 6–8, 2020 | Online convention | | |
| November 5–7, 2021 | Oregon Convention Center; Portland, Oregon | 8,923 | ACME, Morgan Berry, Kira Buckland, Robbie Daymond, Alisa Freedman, Caleb Hyles, Billy Kametz, James Landino, Faye Mata, Erica Mendez, Momma Sammu, Laura Stahl, Ciarán Strange, TeddyLoid, and Abby Trott. |
| November 11–13, 2022 | Oregon Convention Center; Portland, Oregon | 11,199 | Bennett Abara, DJ Amaya, Burnout Syndromes, Ray Chase, Zack Davisson, Robbie Daymond, Alisa Freedman, Caleb Hyles, DJ Kagamine, Shigeto Koyama, Cherami Leigh, Adam McArthur, Max Mittelman, Momma Sammu, Bryce Papenbrook, Kaiji Tang, TeddyLoid, Cristina Vee, Hiromi Wakabayashi, December Wynn, and Anne Yatco. |
| November 17–19, 2023 | Oregon Convention Center; Portland, Oregon | 11,729 | 6%Dokidoki, ACME, Black Bettie, Griffin Burns, Dani Chambers, Crusher-P, Alisa Freedman, Caleb Hyles, Brittney Karbowski, Haruka Kurebayashi, Lauren Landa, E. Jason Liebrecht, Michelle Marie, Amber May, Brandon McInnis, Patrick Pedraza, Alejandro Saab, Rock M. Sakura, Keith Silverstein, Karen Strassman, J. Michael Tatum, Teca, Jeannie Tirado, Kana Ueda, Howard Wang, and Jonathan Young. |
| November 8–10, 2024 | Oregon Convention Center; Portland, Oregon | 12,304 | Britt Baron, Black Bettie, Johnny Yong Bosch, Allegra Clark, Crusher, Eli Ebberts, Faeliae Kitsune, Kyle "Turtle Smithy" Mathis, Malinda "Malindachan" Mathis, David Matranga, Xander Mobus, Nano, OR3O, Zeno Robinson, Michelle Ruff, Scottaconda, Stephanie Sheh, and Briana White. |
| October 31 – November 2, 2025 | Oregon Convention Center; Portland, Oregon | 11,661 | Miura Ayme, Ben Balmaceda, Aaron Campbell, Creep-P, Adam Croasdell, Alisa Freedman, DJ GreenFlöw, Todd Haberkorn, Jill Harris, Kohei Hattori, Heartless Aquarius, Caleb Hyles, Hylian Cream, Kikuko Inoue, Shin Kurokawa, None Like Joshua, PAiDA, Oriana Perón, Atelier Pierrot, Mallorie Rodak, Ciarán Strange, Karlii Hoch, and Knovice Cosplay. |
| November 13-15, 2026 | Oregon Convention Center; Portland, Oregon | | AlpacaAsh, Kira Buckland, SungWon Cho, Colleen Cosplay, Khoi Dao, Zack Davisson, Ricco Fajardo, Alisa Freedman, Stephen Fu, Ayaka Fukuhara, Damien Haas, DJ Jimni Cricket, Landon McDonald, Erica Mendez, Casey Mongillo, Ayaka Ohashi, Oriana Perón, Lisa Reimold, Patrick Seitz, Laura Stahl, and David Vincent. |

== See also ==
- Culture of Portland, Oregon
