= Anina Bennett =

American comics writer

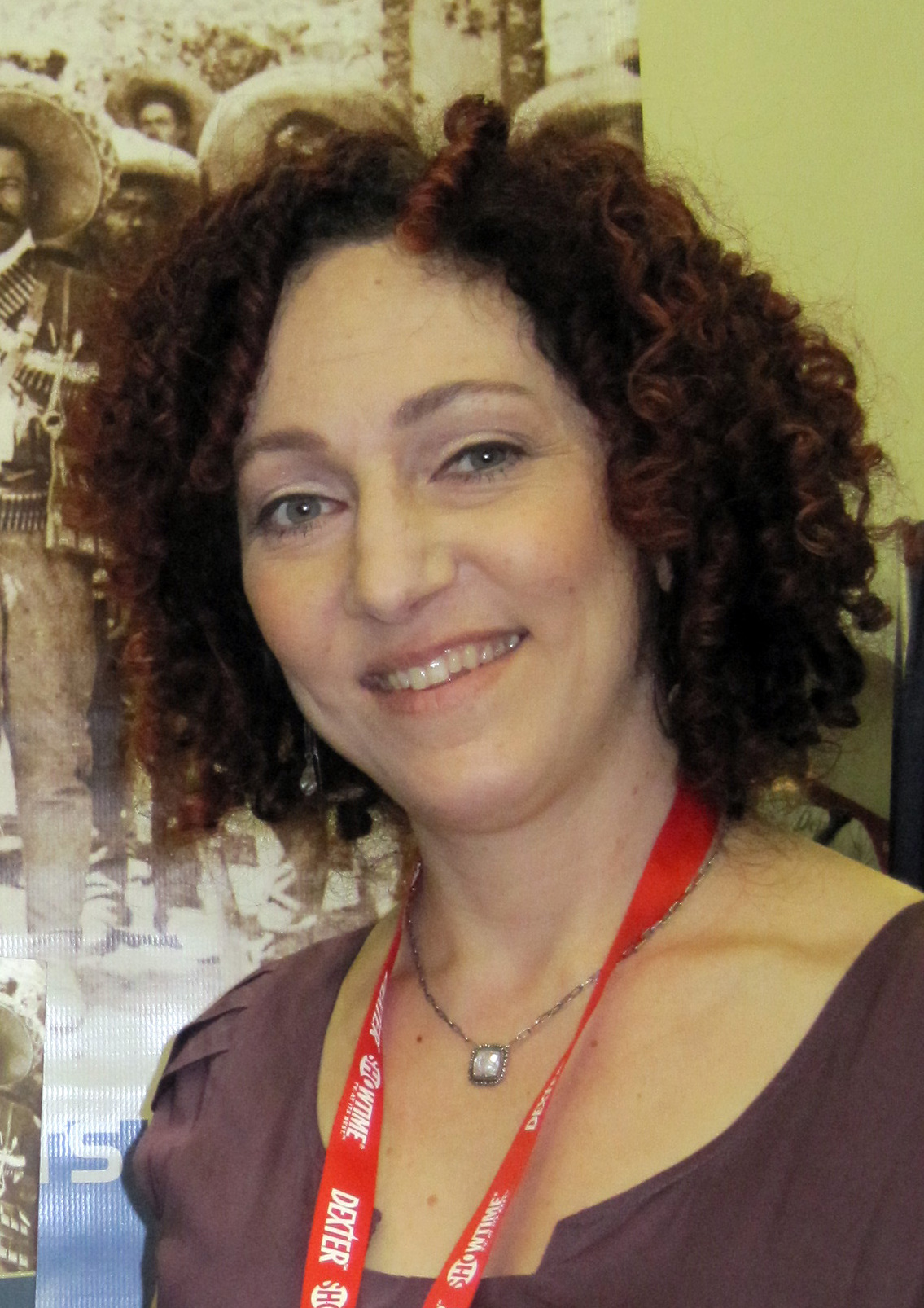
- Anina Bennett at 2010 WonderCon
- Born: January 13, 1965 (age 61) Chicago
- Areas: Writer, Penciller, Artist, Inker
- Awards: 2011 Inkpot Award by Comic-Con International; Her work was included in the Oregon Historical Society’s 2016-2017 exhibit Comic City, USA.

Anina Bennett is an American writer and comic book editor and producer. Some of the famous works she has been part of are the Boilerplate robot hoax/comic or various Dark Horse Comics she has produced. Anina Bennett is part of the husband-and-wife team with Paul Guinan who have been collaborating in print since 1989. Bennett and Guinan created Heartbreakers that same year. This series was groundbreaking as it was one of the first to feature clones and a group of female comic book heroes. She is currently working with Guinan on a historical graphic novel, Aztec Empire.

== Early career ==
Anina Bennett is from Chicago and started her career working as an editor for multiple titles for First Comics and Dark Horse Comics. She married Paul Guinan in 1991 and moved with him to Portland, Oregon.

== Boilerplate ==
Paul Guinan and Anina Bennett's most famous work is probably Boilerplate a series about a fictional robot which would have existed in the Victorian era and early 20th century. Originally featured on a website created by Guinan in 2000, Boilerplate details the history of a remarkable robot built in the late 19th century, and features photoshopped "archival images." In reality, the robot is actually a 12 inches (30 cm) articulated model which was seen interacting with historical figures, such as Teddy Roosevelt and Pancho Villa, the famous Mexican bandit that invaded America during the Battle of Columbus on March 9, 1916. Edward Wyatt of the New York Times called boilerplate "Deliciously detailed." At one point even J. J. Abrams wanted to develop a project with the 1893 robot.

== Seminars ==
Paul Guinan and Anina Bennett are regulars of the comic con scene and often give seminars. Bennett is also part of Friends of Lulu and the women's arts organization, Siren Nation. Both of which promote comic books to women and encourage women to enter the comic book industrial complex.

== Multimedia work ==
| | Title | Role | Date started |
|---|---|---|---|
| | Heartbreakers | Creator | 1989 |
| | Inventor Phillip Louis (Phil) Perew from Tonawanda, NY | Creator | |
| Dark Horse Comics | Cheval Noir | Editor | 1989 – 1994 |
| Dark Horse Comics | Aliens: Salvation | Editor | 2013 |
| Dark Horse Comics | Aliens | Artist | February 13, 2013 |
| Dark Horse Comics | Nexus Omnibus | Editor | 2016 |

Published Books

- Bennett, Anina; Hundall, James D. (1997). Heartbreakers Bust Out. Image Comics. ISBN 9781887279499. - Total pages: 168
- Guinan, Paul; Bennett, Anina (1999). Heartbreakers Superdigest, Volume 2. Image Comics. ISBN 9781582401249. - Total pages: 96
- Guinan, Paul; Bennett, Anina (2012). Boilerplate: History's Mechanical Marvel. Abrams. ISBN 9781613120316. - Total pages: 168
- Guinan, Paul; Bennett, Anina (2012). Frank Reade. Harry N. Abrams. ISBN 9780810996618. - Total pages: 176

== Comic Con ==
Anina Bennett was an official guest of the following:

- 2011 San Diego Comic-Con
- 2013 Stumptown Comics Fest
- 2013 Kumoricon

== Bibliography ==
Notes

References

- Anderson, David S. (June 11, 2019). "Aztec Empire Brought To Life In New Graphic Novel". Forbes.
- Baron, Mike; Rude, Steve (2016). Bennett, Anina (ed.). Nexus Omnibus Volume 8, Volume 8. Dark Horse Comics. ISBN 9781630086664. - Total pages: 472
- Big Red Hair (2020). "Paul Guinan". Big Red Hair.
- Dark Horse Comics (2020). "Author: Paul Guinan, Aninia Bennett - Illustrated by Rachelle Menashe, Kilian Plunkett". Dark Horse Comics.
- Dooley, John (November 7, 2002). "The Factual Fiction of Paul Guinan's Hysterical Hoax". Portland Mercury. Portland, Oregon. Archived from the original on June 27, 2020.
- Kit, Borys; Fernandez, Jay A. (July 29, 2010). "J.J. Abrams producing period robot movie 'Boilerplate' (exclusive)". The Hollywood Reporter. ISSN 0018-3660. OCLC 1752197. Archived from the original on July 30, 2010.
- Gibbons, Dave (2013). Bennett, Anina (ed.). Aliens: Salvation. Dark Horse Comics. - Total pages: 50
- Guinan, Paul; Bennett, Anina (2012). Boilerplate: History's Mechanical Marvel. Abrams. ISBN 9781613120316. - Total pages: 168
- Utah Arts Festival (June 23, 2017). "Graphic arts workshop: making comic books". Utah Arts Festival.
- Wyatt, Edward (November 1, 2005). "The Strange Case of the Spoofer Captured by a Spoof". The New York Times. ISSN 1553-8095. OCLC 164552.
