= Baird Center =

Convention center in Milwaukee, Wisconsin

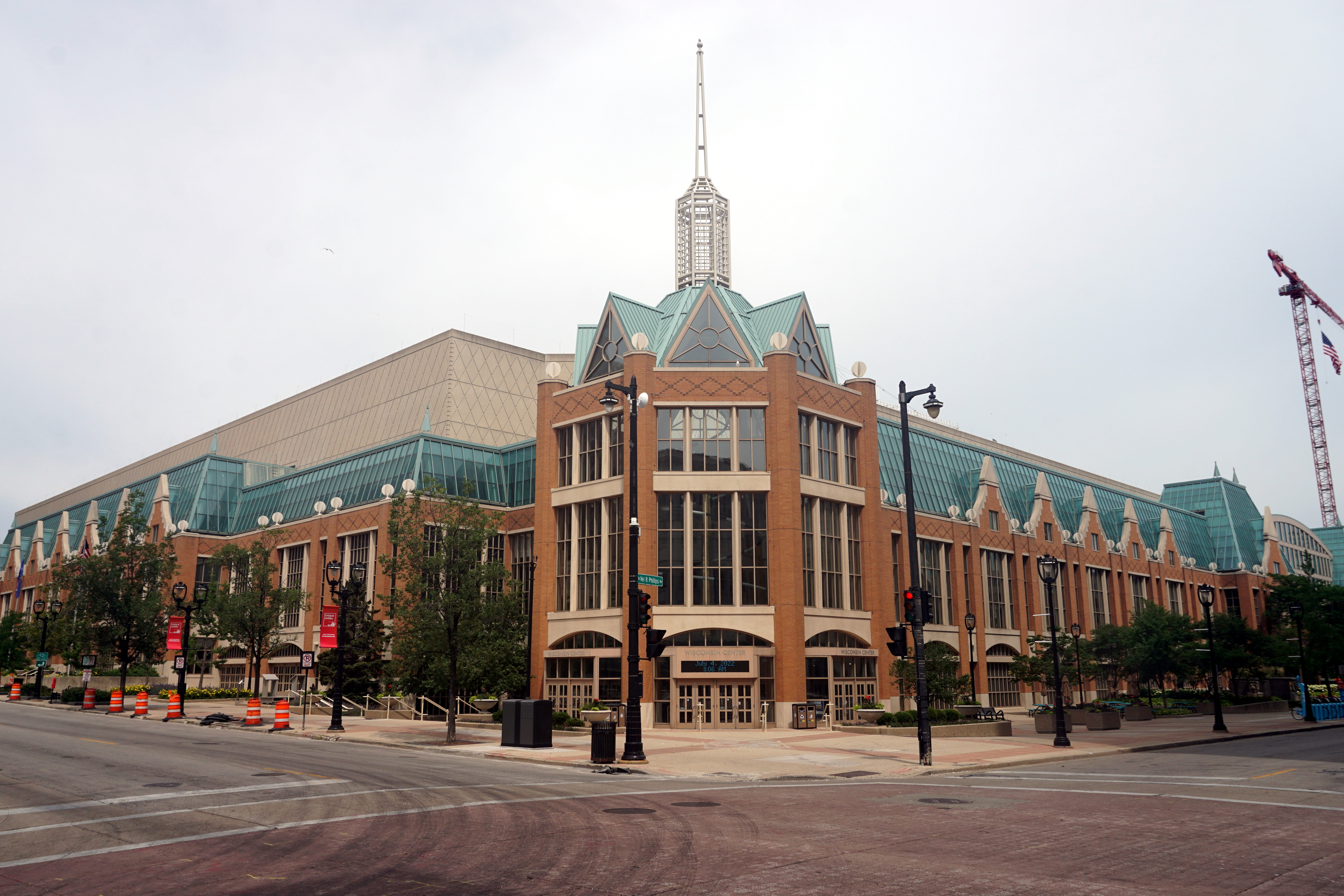
- Entrance to the Baird Center's southern building
- Interactive map of Baird Center
- Former names: Midwest Express Center (1998–2002); Midwest Airlines Center (2002–2010); Frontier Airlines Center (2010–2012); Delta Center (2012–2013); Wisconsin Center (2013-2023)
- Coordinates: 43°2′23″N 87°55′2″W
- Operator: Wisconsin Center District
- Public transit: MCTS

Construction
- Opened: 1998 (phase 1); 2024 (phase 2)

The Baird Center (formerly Wisconsin Center, Midwest Express Center, Midwest Airlines Center, Frontier Airlines Center, and Delta Center) is a convention and exhibition center located in downtown Milwaukee, Wisconsin. The center is part of a greater complex of buildings which includes the UW–Milwaukee Panther Arena and the Miller High Life Theatre, and was a replacement for the former Great Hall portion of the MECCA Complex.

The convention center hosted the 2020 Democratic National Convention. The event was initially planned to be held in the nearby Fiserv Forum but was ultimately downsized due to the COVID-19 pandemic.

== Description ==
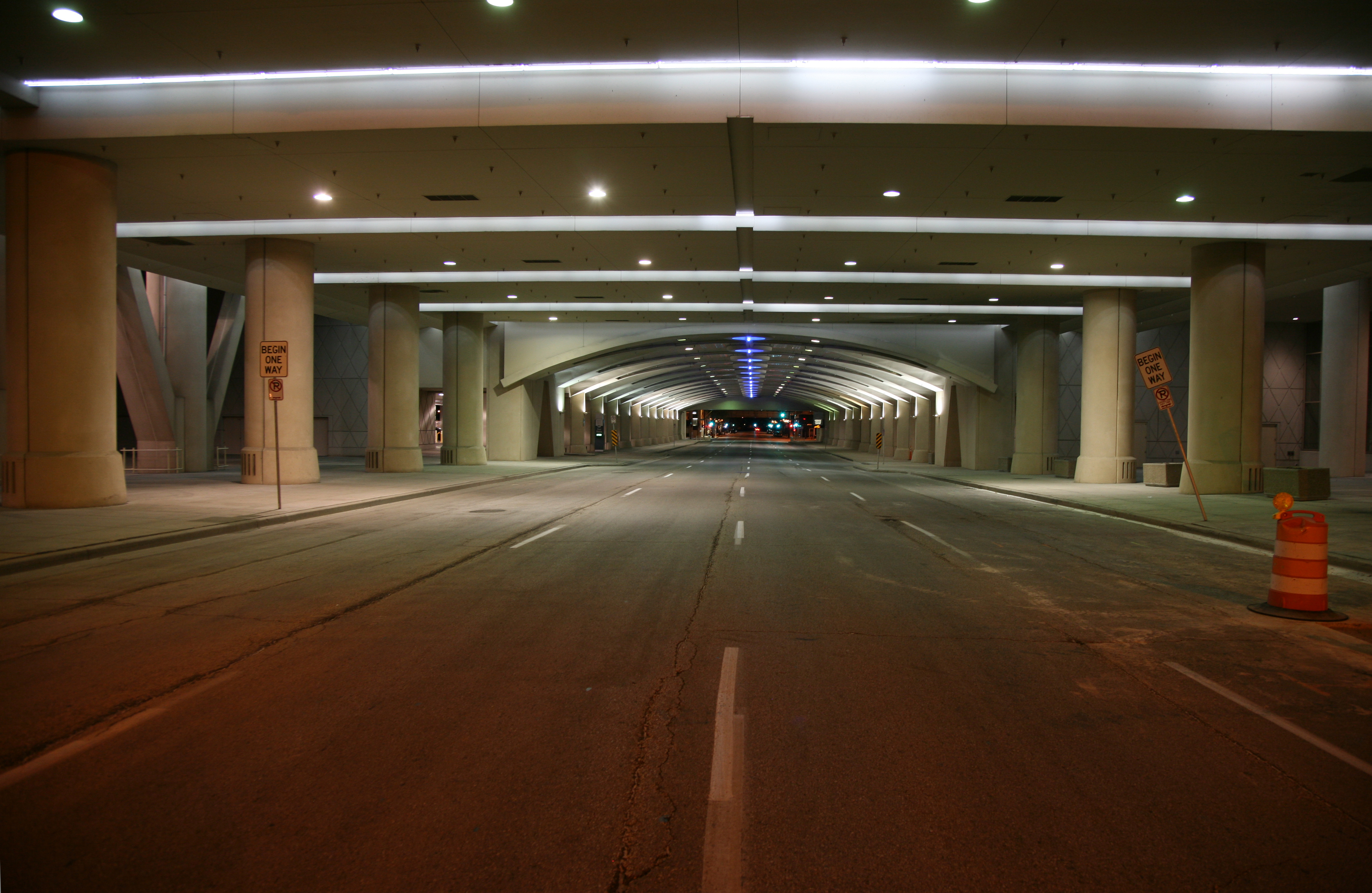
The venue straddles West Wells Street, with a tunnel for the roadway to run through it

The venue straddles West Wells Street in downtown Milwaukee. It is operated by the Wisconsin Center District, which also operates the adjacent UW–Milwaukee Panther Arena and Miller High Life Theatre. Skywalks connect the convention center to the nearby Hilton (Hilton Milwaukee City Center) and Hyatt hotels.

The convention center features 300,000-square-foot (28,000 m^{2}) of exhibition space, including two ballrooms.

=== Design ===
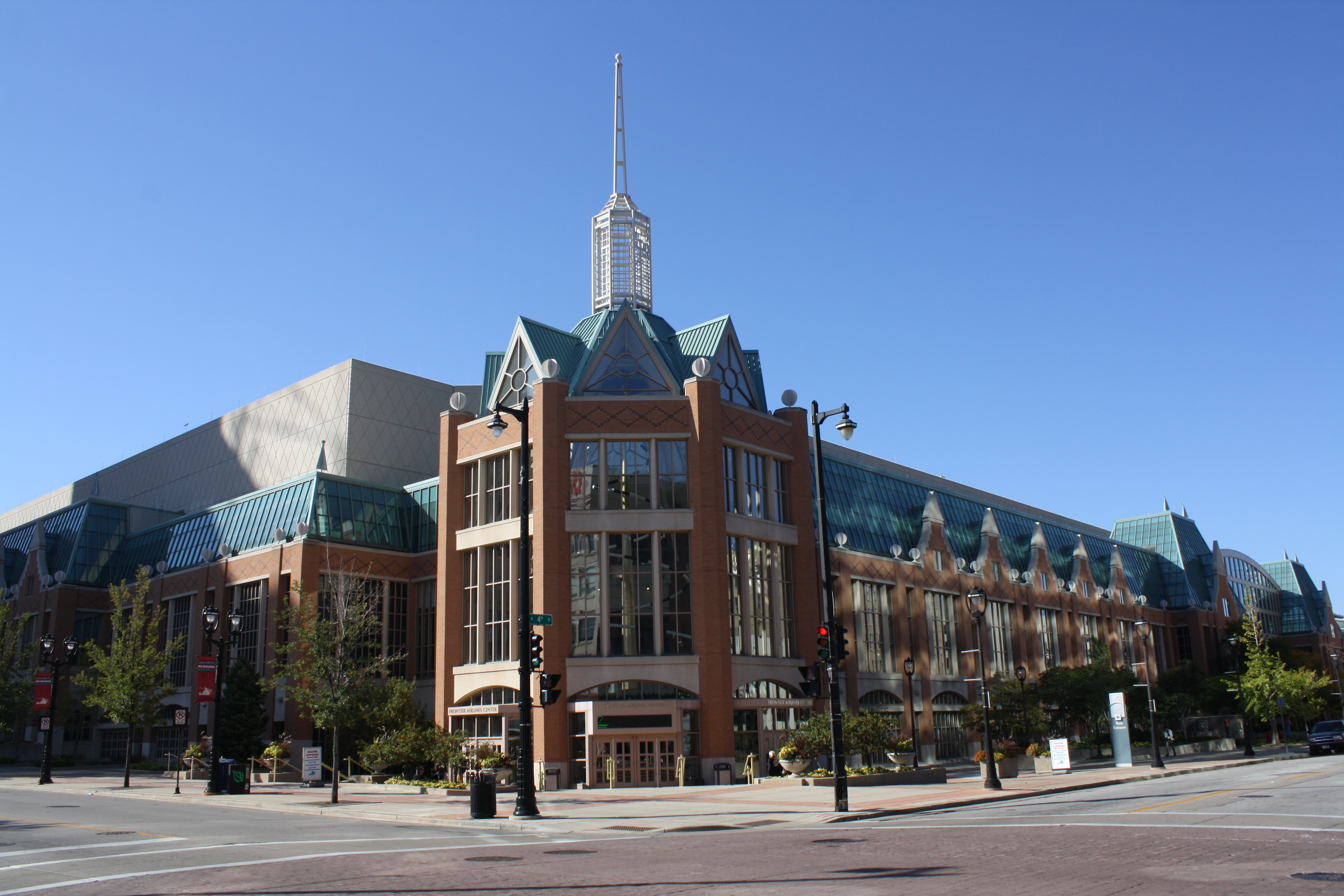
Convention center in 2012

The architecture of the portions of the building opened in 1998 and 2000 reinterpret the many historic German buildings found in downtown Milwaukee. Along with art-as-design features, the John J. Burke Family Collection is scattered throughout the interior. On the Vel R. Phillips Ave side of the center is an outdoor reliquary garden named City Yard. Created by artist Sheila Klein, it contains many iconic items from Milwaukee's DPW such as fire hydrants and the classic blue police call box. Within this area are planters containing ginkgo trees and a large monument with four limestone lion heads set in relief. These architectural elements were salvaged from the AT&T building that once stood nearby. The expansion that opened in 2024 differs architecturally, featuring a glassy and modern design.

These initial segments of the building contained 188,695 square feet (17,530.3 m^{2}) of contiguous exhibit space along with a 37,506-square-foot (3,484.4 m^{2}) ballroom. The expansion that was opened in 2024 provided an additional 111,000-square-foot (10,300 m^{2}) giving the convention center's approximately 300,000-square-foot (28,000 m^{2}) of exhibition space.

=== Art ===
Artist Vito Acconci created an indoor-outdoor sculpture titled Walkways Through the Wall. Designed to integrate private and public space, these curled terra cotta colored concrete strips flow through structural boundaries and provide seating at both ends.

Art was incorporated early in the design stage; the Hilton's skywalk entrance foyer floor features a green floor mosaic in the shape of Wisconsin, with Michigan depicted in gold, Minnesota in pink, Iowa in red, and Illinois in gray. Region inlays represent area industries and dairy cows. A half-dozen flush bronze containers contain different soil types.

From the venue's opening until 2023, the southwest corner held an interactive art installation by Dick Blau titled "Polka Time!". Also known as the "polkalator", it consisted of an escalator with 22 photos of polka dances on the wall, and a button labeled "Push to Play Polka" that played a random selection from 200 songs. Most of the photos were taken at a 1976 party in Milwaukee celebrating the United States Bicentennial. In 2021, the venue suggested the removal of a photo with a man sticking out his tongue, but Blau refused because he considered the artwork a fixed set. The installation was removed on August 18, 2023, during the building's expansion project. Blau led an event to document the escalator on its last day. The Baird Center returned the artwork to Blau, who said it would be difficult to find a new venue for it.

== Venue history ==
The convention center was opened in two phases: the first was completed in 1998, and the second completed in 2000. It was the largest design-build project in Wisconsin history. In 1998, $1.2 million of public art was installed and named the John J. Burke Family Collection.

=== Expansion ===
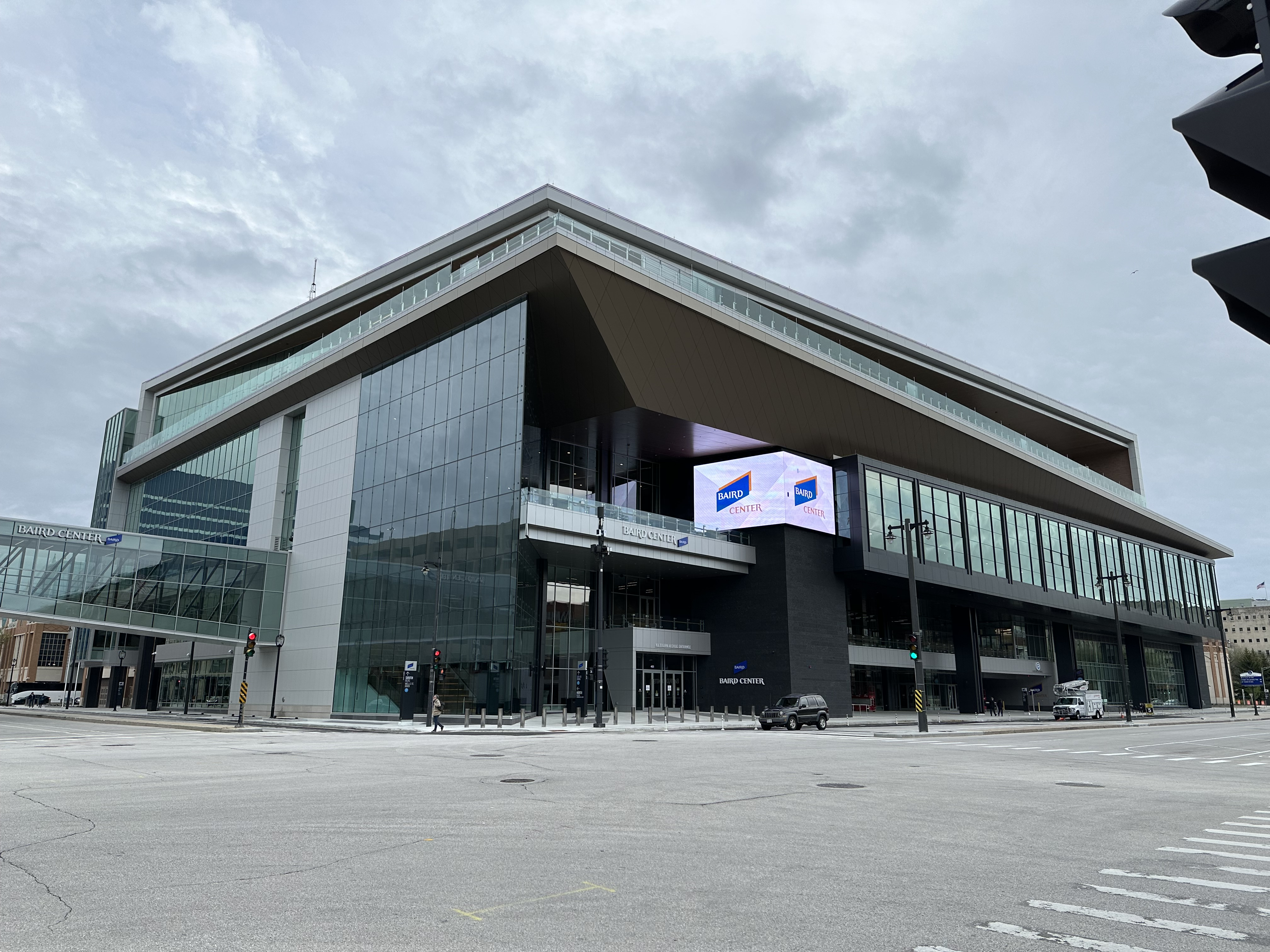
Expansion, photographed in May 2024

In December 2019, Eppstein Uhen Architects and tvsdesign were selected by the Wisconsin Center District to be the architecture team of the expansion project. In January 2020, Gilbane Building Company and C.D. Smith were awarded the construction management contract for the expansion. In February 2020, the Milwaukee Common Council granted the Wisconsin Center District Board approval to finance the planned $420 million expansion to the venue. In April 2020, the Wisconsin Center District Board approved the expansion. In the autumn of 2020, the Wisconsin Center District sold bonds to finance the expansion. Plans are to pay off the bonds over a 40-year period, through Milwaukee County hotel, restaurant, and car rental taxes levied by the Wisconsin Center District, with debt payments beginning in 2027. Site work for the expansion began in the summer of 2021. The groundbreaking ceremony was held on October 28, 2021.

Designed by Eppstein Uhen Architects and tvsdesign, the expansion differs in architectural style from the existing structure, being more modern and glassy.

The expansion roughly doubled the venue's square footage by adding 111,000 square feet (10,300 m^{2}) of exhibition space and 1,300,000 square feet (120,000 m^{2}) of overall space to a total of The expansion is designed to enable the venue to hold two conventions simultaneously, with the convention center's new wing having its own separate entrance, as well as a second ballroom, which is 35,000 square feet (3,300 m^{2}) in size. The new exhibition space also includes 24 new meeting rooms, increasing the convention center's total to 52.

Other additions the expansion includes are an outdoor terrace, six additional loading docks, 400 new indoor parking spots, new public art, a second kitchen,

The expansion is being built atop land previously occupied by parking lots on the block of the convention center between West Wells Street and West Kilbourn Avenue.

In May 2022, the Wisconsin Center District board disclosed that the final cost of the expansion would likely be double the original estimate of $420 million, with the board laying blame on inflation. It ultimately cost $465 million.

The expansion was substantially completed on March 29, 2024, and was officially opened on May 16, 2024.

=== Names ===
When the convention center opened in the 1990s, its naming rights were initially sold to Midwest Airlines. On April 13, 2010, Republic Airways Holdings CEO Bryan Bedford announced that the name would change to Frontier Airlines Center, coinciding with the consolidation of brands between Frontier Airlines and Midwest Airlines. On August 15, 2012, Delta Air Lines purchased the building's naming rights as part of the carrier's recent expansion at Milwaukee's General Mitchell International Airport. The facility changed its name from the Frontier Airlines Center to the Delta Center effective from September 19, 2012; signage was replaced accordingly in November. On June 30, 2013, Delta terminated its naming rights at the center and the facility was officially renamed the "Wisconsin Center" the following day.

In March 2023, local investment firm Robert W. Baird & Co. purchased the convention center's naming rights. This took effect on July 1, 2023.

== Event history ==
Alongside the Hyatt Regency Milwaukee, the center hosted the 2004 Green National Convention. The first three days of the convention were held at the Hyatt Regency, while the final day was held at the convention center.

The center hosted the 2020 Democratic National Convention. The event was initially planned to be held in the nearby Fiserv Forum but was ultimately downsized due to the COVID-19 pandemic.
