= Boilerplate (robot) =

Fictional robot from the 19th century

- Boilerplate and Teddy Roosevelt

Publication information
- First appearance: Boilerplate website, July 2000
- Created by: Paul Guinan

In-story information
- Species: Robot
- Partnerships: Professor Archibald Campion

Boilerplate is a fictional robot which would have existed in the Victorian era and early 20th century. It was created in 2000 by Portland, Oregon USA artist Paul Guinan. Originally intended for comics, the character became known via a faux-historical website created by Guinan, and has since appeared in other media.

== Development ==
Boilerplate was originally featured on a website created by Paul Guinan in 2000. The Boilerplate site details the history of a remarkable robot built in the late 19th century, and features photoshopped "archival images" in which Boilerplate (actually a 12-inch articulated model) is seen interacting with historical figures, such as Theodore Roosevelt and Pancho Villa. Becoming aware that some visitors to the site were taken in by its contents, making it an unintentional hoax, Guinan resolved to see how authentic he could make the character seem, working to ensure the descriptions of non-fictional events were accurate. He explained his motivation in a 2002 interview

"Certainly I felt happy about having achieved my goal," he said. "I put this thing across as trying to be real, and people bought into it. So, that's a success! But, as an amateur historian, I feel a responsibility to get the story right. So I felt bad about some of these people being hoaxed. It was a mixed bag."

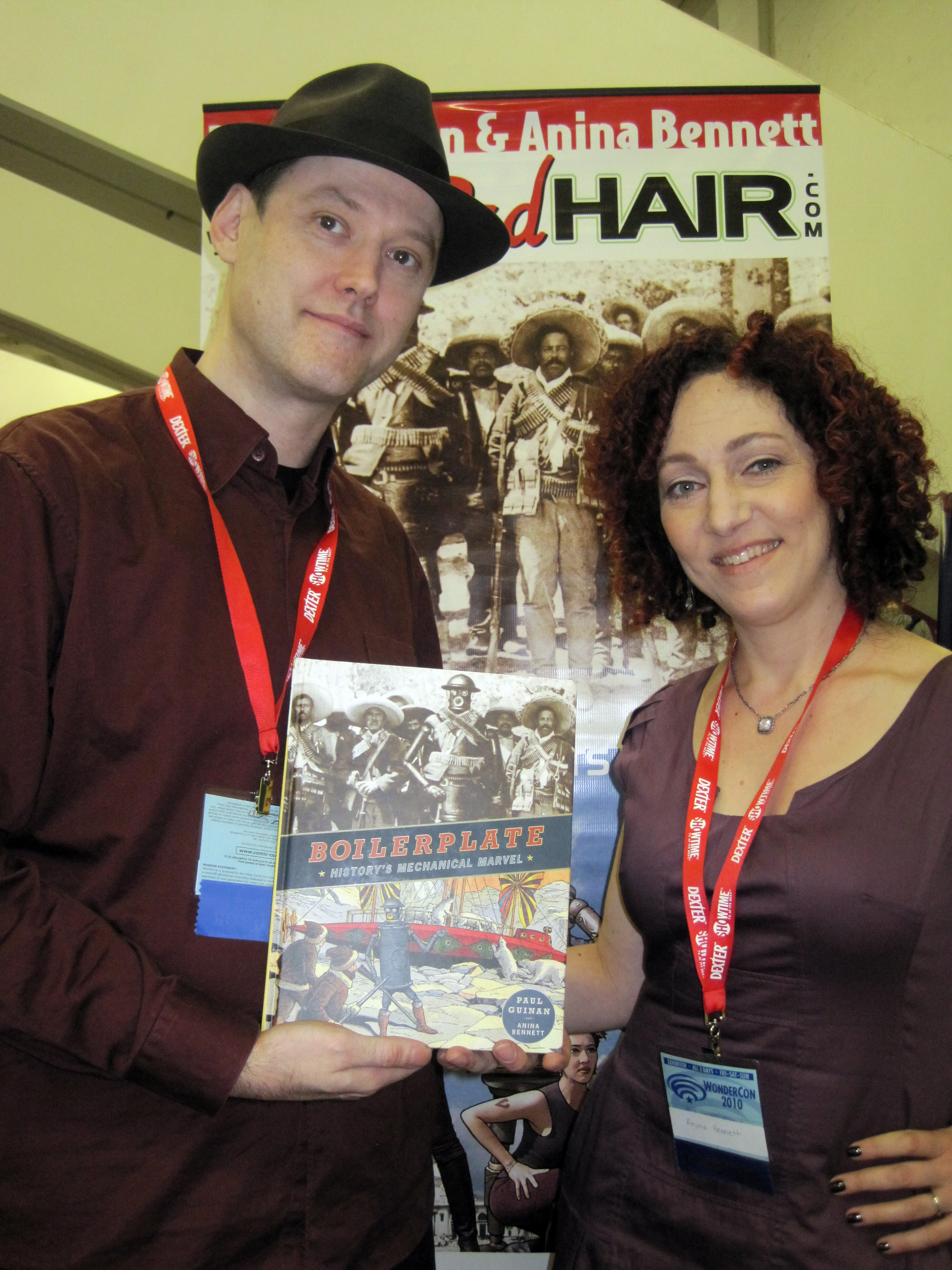
Guinan and Bennett at WonderCon 2010

"But," he revealed, "I thought, if I was getting this reaction and I wasn't really trying, then what would happen if I really tried?"

Guinan estimated that roughly a third of the site's visitors treated its faux history as real. Comedian Chris Elliott, while realising that Boilerplate was fictional, thought that the spoof dated back to the 19th century and included the character in one of his books (see below).

Guinan later expanded his website into The History of Robots in the Victorian Era, which features other "turn-of-the-century robots, both real and imagined".

== Fictional character history ==
Boilerplate is built by Professor Archibald Campion in the 1880s and unveiled at the 1893 World's Columbian Exposition in Chicago. The robot's notable adventures include an expedition to the Antarctic, during which it saves the lives of the team members by singlehandedly moving ice floes, clearing a path for the ship to sail out.

Designed for the self-proclaimed purpose of "preventing the deaths of men in the conflicts of nations," Boilerplate charges into combat during the Spanish–American War and the Boxer Rebellion. Campion and his robot also circle the planet with the U.S. Navy, make silent movies, and hobnob with the likes of Mark Twain and Nikola Tesla.

Boilerplate is also active in the First World War, but disappears during the relief of Major Whittlesey's Lost Battalion, possibly having been captured by the Germans for study. Supporters of this theory point out that German military technology advances tremendously in the twenty years between the two world wars, encompassing guided rockets, experimental jets, and sophisticated tanks. Post World War II, Boilerplate is sighted on a number of occasions, often in Chicago.

== In other media ==
- Paul Guinan and his wife Anina Bennett (who also maintains the Boilerplate website) have coauthored Boilerplate: History's Mechanical Marvel, an illustrated history of the character's adventures. This coffee table book covers Boilerplate's 25-year existence as well as its subsequent impact on popular culture. It was published by Abrams Image in October 2009. Guinan and Bennett have previously collaborated on the comic book Heartbreakers, published by IDW Publishing; "Heartbreakers Meet Boilerplate", a 2005 one-shot of this series, also featured Boilerplate and was nominated for an Eisner Award.
- Boilerplate is a character in Chris Elliott's 2005 novel The Shroud of the Thwacker, a spoof historical thriller. Elliott mistakenly thought that the Boilerplate site concerned a hoax which dated back to the 19th century and included material from the website in his book, not realising it wasn't in the public domain. After being alerted to the copyright infringement, Elliott and Guinan negotiated a settlement which allowed the character to be used in exchange for a percentage of Elliott's earnings from the book and credit in future editions.
- Boilerplate is featured on the cover of Canadian indie pop band Stars's 2008 EP Sad Robots, as well as on merchandise for their 2008–9 tour.
- Bill Griffith's 2025 biography of his great-grandfather William Henry Jackson, Photographic Memory, weaves Boilerplate's mythology into Jackson's life story.
- Paramount Pictures have optioned the film rights, to be produced by J. J. Abrams and his Bad Robot production company.
