= MECCA Great Hall =

Former convention center in Milwaukee, Wisconsin

Coordinates: 43°02′26″N 87°55′03″W

The MECCA Great Hall was a 6,500-capacity convention center located in Milwaukee, Wisconsin, which existed from 1974 to 1998. It had 66,000 square feet of space with a 45-foot-high ceiling, and was part of the MECCA Complex. The Baird Center was built as a replacement for the hall.
