= Anime Detour =

Anime convention in Minneapolis, Minnesota

Coordinates: 44°58′14″N 93°16′41″W

- Status: Active
- Venue: Hyatt Regency Minneapolis
- Location: Minneapolis, Minnesota
- Country: United States
- Inaugurated: 2004
- Attendance: 8,143 in 2023
- Organizer: Anime Twin Cities, Inc.
- Filing status: 501(c)(3)
- Website: http://www.animedetour.com/

Anime Detour is an annual three-day anime convention held during March/April at the Hyatt Regency Minneapolis in Minneapolis, Minnesota. The convention run by the non-profit organization Anime Twin Cities.

== Programming ==
The convention typically offers anime music videos, anime rooms, artist alley, costume contests, guest panels, a masquerade, vendors' room, and workshops.

== History ==
The convention in 2009 had an attendance cap of 3,500, and was sold out a month ahead of the event. In 2011 the convention held a fundraiser for voice actor Greg Ayres, who needed dental work due to an attack he suffered during his youth. Anime Detour 2011 raised $36,000 towards tsunami relief, resulting in Anime Twin Cities being awarded the American Red Cross Donor Award. The convention and its parent company Anime Twin Cities, inc held a fundraiser for voice actress Carrie Savage in 2013, to help with costs due to muscular dystrophy. Anime Detour and its parent company Anime Twin Cities created a fundraiser for voice actor Christopher Ayres in late 2017, to help with his COPD medical costs. The convention moved to a larger location in Minneapolis for 2018. Anime Detour 2020 was cancelled due to the COVID-19 pandemic. Anime Detour 2021 was also cancelled due to the COVID-19 pandemic.

Following the 2024 event, the convention chair was fired by the board of Anime Twin Cities. The chair and other staff fired sued Anime Twin Cities in March 2025.

=== Event History ===
Dates	Location	Atten.	Guests
March 26–28, 2004	Minneapolis Airport Marriott; Bloomington, Minnesota	1,219	Dr. Marc Hairston, Kyle Hebert, Kristofer "Phade" McCormic, Monica Rial, and Carrie Savage.
March 11–13, 2005	Ramada Inn Airport Hotel and Thunderbird Convention Center; Bloomington, Minnesota	1,550	Greg Ayres, Dr. Marc Hairston, Kyle Hebert, Jonathan Klein, Kristofer "Phade" McCormic, Monica Rial, Carrie Savage, and Travis Willingham.
March 24–26, 2006	Ramada Inn Airport Hotel and Thunderbird Convention Center; Bloomington, Minnesota	2,464	Greg Ayres, Emily DeJesus, Robert DeJesus, Tiffany Grant, Matt Greenfield, Kyle Hebert, Jonathan Klein, Rebecca Marjesdatter, Kristofer "Phade" McCormic, Monica Rial, Carrie Savage, and Joan Vinge.
March 23–25, 2007	Ramada Mall of America; Bloomington, Minnesota	3,000	Christopher Ayres, Greg Ayres, Clarine Harp, Kyle Hebert, Barb Jacobs, Steve Jones, Brittney Karbowski, Michael McConnohie, Kristofer "Phade" McCormic, Carrie Savage, and Melodee M. Spevack.
April 4–6, 2008	Ramada Mall of America; Bloomington, Minnesota	3,000	Christopher Ayres, Greg Ayres, Michael Coleman, Clarine Harp, Kyle Hebert, Jamie Marchi, Kristofer "Phade" McCormic, and Carrie Savage.
April 3–5, 2009	Crowne Plaza Hotel St. Paul-Riverfront; Saint Paul, Minnesota	3,541	Pete Abrams, Christopher Ayres, Greg Ayres, Clarine Harp, Kyle Hebert, Kristofer "Phade" McCormic, Randy Milholland, Carrie Savage, Richard Townsend, and Shannon Townsend.
April 23–25, 2010	Sheraton Bloomington Hotel, Minneapolis South; Minneapolis, Minnesota	4,461	Christopher Ayres, Greg Ayres, Emily DeJesus, Robert DeJesus, Clarine Harp, Kyle Hebert, Brittney Karbowski, Kristofer "Phade" McCormic, Carli Mosier, Carrie Savage, Jan Scott-Frazier, Voices For, and Shinichi Watanabe.
April 1–3, 2011	Sheraton Bloomington Hotel, Minneapolis South; Minneapolis, Minnesota	4,573	Christopher Ayres, Greg Ayres, Jessie James Grelle, Clarine Harp, Kyle Hebert, Taliesin Jaffe, Brittney Karbowski, Kristofer "Phade" McCormic, Carli Mosier, Monica Rial, Carrie Savage, J. Michael Tatum, Tadao Tomomatsu, Richard Townsend, Shannon Townsend, and Lisle Wilkerson.
March 30–April 1, 2012	Sheraton Bloomington Hotel, Minneapolis South; Minneapolis, Minnesota	5,000	Christopher Ayres, Greg Ayres, Jessie James Grelle, Clarine Harp, Kyle Hebert, Taliesin Jaffe, Allison Keith-Shipp, Kristofer "Phade" McCormic, Carrie Savage, Ian Sinclair, Tadao Tomomatsu, Richard Townsend, Shannon Townsend, Shinichi Watanabe, and YTCracker.
April 19–21, 2013	DoubleTree by Hilton Bloomington Minneapolis South; Bloomington, Minnesota	5,038	Christopher Ayres, Greg Ayres, Emily DeJesus, Robert DeJesus, Matt Greenfield, Clarine Harp, Kristofer "Phade" McCormic, Randy Milholland, Carrie Savage, Ian Sinclair, J. Michael Tatum, Richard Townsend, and Shannon Townsend.
April 4–6, 2014	DoubleTree by Hilton Bloomington Minneapolis South; Bloomington, Minnesota	5,313	Christopher Ayres, Greg Ayres, Chris Cason, Clarine Harp, Kyle Hebert, Chris Jones, Kristofer "Phade" McCormic, Tony Oliver, Dai Sato, Carrie Savage, Arina Tanemura, Richard Townsend, and Shannon Townsend.
March 27–29, 2015	DoubleTree by Hilton Bloomington Minneapolis South; Bloomington, Minnesota	5,331	Christopher Ayres, Greg Ayres, Jessica Calvello, Caitlynn French, Jessie James Grelle, Kyle Hebert, Kristofer "Phade" McCormic, Tony Oliver, Carrie Savage, Tadao Tomomatsu, Richard Townsend, and Shannon Townsend.
April 22–24, 2016	DoubleTree by Hilton Bloomington Minneapolis South; Bloomington, Minnesota	5,927	Aya "Dancing Fighter", Christopher Ayres, Greg Ayres, Briana "Tactical Pinup" Falb-Joslin, Clarine Harp, Kyle Hebert, Briana Lawrence, Kristofer "Phade" McCormic, Tony Oliver, Carrie Savage, Tomoko Taniguchi, Tadao Tomomatsu, Jessica Walsh, Lisle Wilkerson, and Amanda Winn-Lee.
April 7–9, 2017	DoubleTree by Hilton Bloomington Minneapolis South; Bloomington, Minnesota	6,217	Greg Ayres, Beau Billingslea, Clarine Harp, Kyle Hebert, Christopher Jones, Kristofer "Phade" McCormic, Daniel Mohr, Tony Oliver, Project BECK, Carrie Savage, and Kaiji Tang.
April 6–8, 2018	Hyatt Regency Minneapolis; Minneapolis, Minnesota		Greg Ayres, Kyle Hebert, Briana Lawrence, Faye Mata, Kristofer "Phade" McCormic, Xander Mobus, Tony Oliver, Carrie Savage, Kaiji Tang, and Jessica Walsh.
March 29–31, 2019	Hyatt Regency Minneapolis; Minneapolis, Minnesota		Jillian Coglan, Samurai Dan Coglan, Fighting Dreamers Productions, Jessie James Grelle, Clarine Harp, Kyle Hebert, Jerry Jewell, Brittney Karbowski, Kazha, Chris Kluwe, Kristofer "Phade" McCormic, Tony Oliver, Derek Stephen Prince, Carrie Savage, and J. Michael Tatum.
March 18–20, 2022	Hyatt Regency Minneapolis; Minneapolis, Minnesota		Griffin Burns, Doug Erholtz, Maile Flanagan, Cherami Leigh, Sarah Natochenny, Tony Oliver, DJ OpM, Lisa Ortiz, Bryce Papenbrook, Keith Silverstein, and Paul St. Peter.
April 7–9, 2023	Hyatt Regency Minneapolis; Minneapolis, Minnesota	8,143	ACME, Johnny Yong Bosch, The Geeky Seamstress, Chris Guerrero, Lauren Landa, Kristofer "Phade" McCormic, Landon McDonald, MeltingMirror, Tony Oliver, Megan Shipman, Austin Tindle, Natalie Van Sistine, and Howard Wang.
March 29–31, 2024	Hyatt Regency Minneapolis; Minneapolis, Minnesota		AlpacaAsh, Dawn M. Bennett, Edward Bosco, DJ GreenFlöw, Richard Horvitz, Erica Lindbeck, Kris "Phade" McCormic, Erica Mendez, Vivian Nixon-Williams, None Like Joshua, Miss OoLaLa, Bryce Pinkham, Brandon Rogers, Rolling Quartz, Peachy Sweet, and Sarah Anne Williams.
March 28–30, 2025	Hyatt Regency Minneapolis; Minneapolis, Minnesota		Kira Buckland, ChibiTifa, Lizzie Freeman, Mary Elizabeth McGlynn, Zeno Robinson, Jonah Scott, Ciarán Strange, and Elias Toufexis.
March 27–29, 2026	Hyatt Regency Minneapolis; Minneapolis, Minnesota		A.J. Beckles, Aaron Campbell, Ben Diskin, Chris Hackney, May Hong, Amber May, Anairis Quiñones, and Kari Wahlgren.
