= Paul Guinan =

American writer and comic book artist

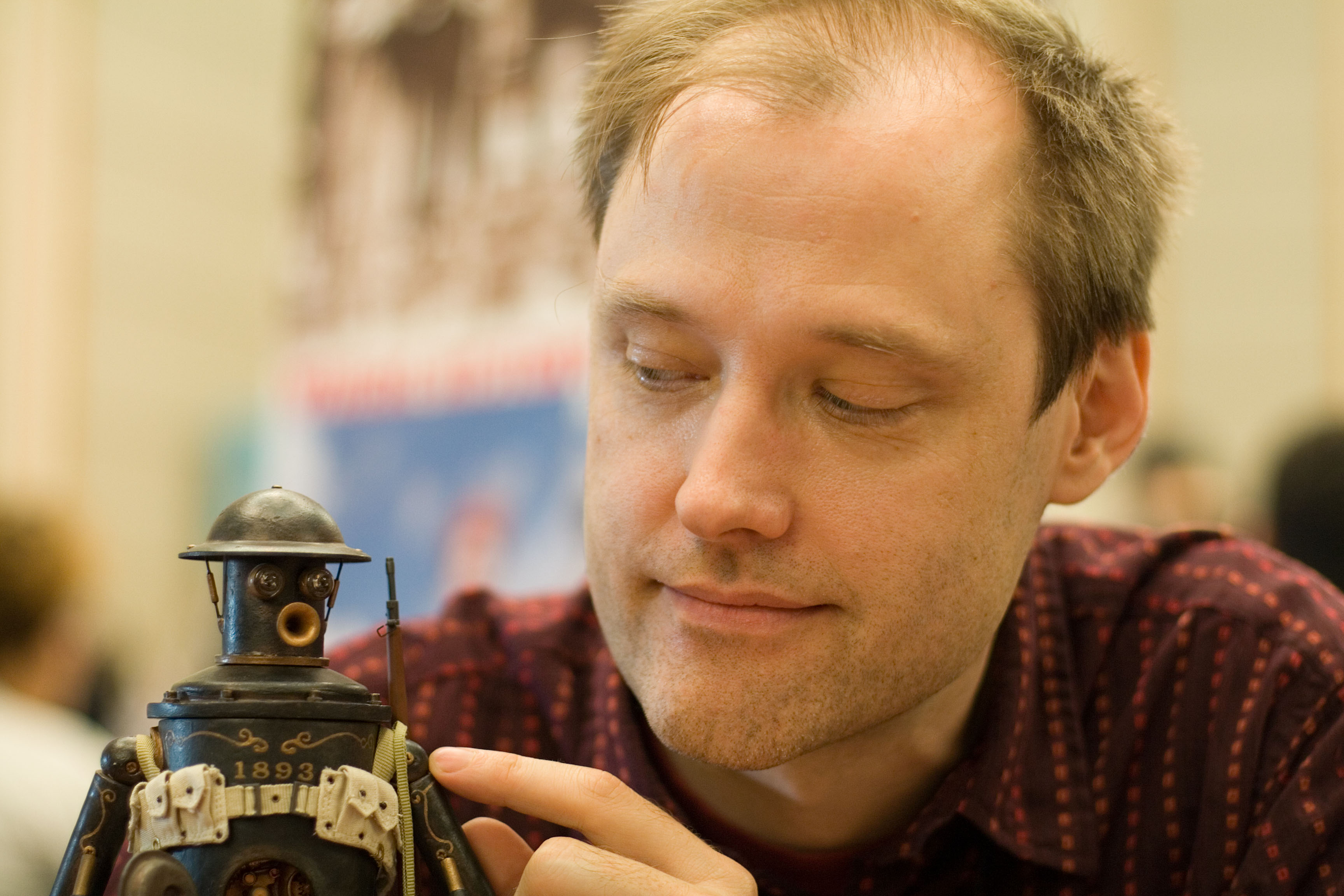
- Paul Guinan with a Boilerplate model
- Born: Portland, Oregon
- Areas: Writer, Penciller, Artist, Inker
- Awards: 2011 Inkpot Award by Comic-Con International

Paul Guinan is an American writer and comic book artist. Some of his most famous works are the Boilerplate robot or DC's Chronos. He is a founding member of Helioscope studio. Paul Guinan is part of the husband-and-wife team with Anina Bennett who have been collaborating in print since 1989. He is currently working on the historical graphic novel Aztec Empire.

== Early career ==
The Portland writer Paul Guinan started out at First Comics, retouching the art on some of the first manga translations published in America. While working for First Comics, he co-created with writer John Francis Moore the time-travelling DC Comics hero Chronos.

== Boilerplate ==
Paul Guinan and Anina Bennett's most famous work is probably Boilerplate, a series about a fictional robot which would have existed in the Victorian era and early 20th century. Originally featured on a website created by Guinan in 2000, Boilerplate details the history of a remarkable robot built in the late 19th century, and features photoshopped "archival images." In reality, the robot is actually a 12 inches (30 cm) articulated model which was seen interacting with historical figures, such as Teddy Roosevelt and Pancho Villa, the famous Mexican bandit that invaded America during the Battle of Columbus on March 9, 1916. Edward Wyatt of the New York Times called boilerplate "Deliciously detailed." At one point even J. J. Abrams wanted to develop a project with the 1893 robot.

== Seminars ==
Paul Guinan and Anina Bennett are regulars of the comic con scene and often give seminars.

== Multimedia work ==
| | Title | Role | Date started |
|---|---|---|---|
| DC Comics | Chronos | co-creator and artist | Chronos #1 (March 1998) |
| DC Comics | Proposition Player | co-creator and artist | 1999 |
| Dark Horse Comics | Barb Wire | Artist | 1995 |
| Dark Horse Comics | The Terminator | Inkers, Cover Artist | August 1, 2012 |
| Dark Horse Comics | Aliens | Artist | February 13, 2013 |

Published Books

- Guinan, Paul; Bennett, Anina (2012). Boilerplate: History's Mechanical Marvel. Abrams. ISBN 9781613120316. - Total pages: 168
- Guinan, Paul; Bennett, Anina (2012). Frank Reade. Harry N. Abrams. ISBN 9780810996618. - Total pages: 176

== Comic Con ==
Paul Guinan was an official guest of the following:

- 2011 San Diego Comic-Con

== Bibliography ==
Notes

References

- Anderson, David S. (June 11, 2019). "Aztec Empire Brought To Life In New Graphic Novel". Forbes.
- Big Red Hair (2020). "Paul Guinan". Big Red Hair.
- Dark Horse Comics (2020). "Paul Guinan". Dark Horse Comics.
- Dooley, John (November 7, 2002). "The Factual Fiction of Paul Guinan's Hysterical Hoax". Portland Mercury. Portland, Oregon: Rob Thompson. Archived from the original on June 27, 2020.
- Kit, Borys; Fernandez, Jay A. (July 29, 2010). "J.J. Abrams producing period robot movie 'Boilerplate' (exclusive)". The Hollywood Reporter. ISSN 0018-3660. OCLC 1752197. Archived from the original on July 30, 2010.
- Guinan, Paul; Bennett, Anina (2012). Boilerplate: History's Mechanical Marvel. Abrams. ISBN 9781613120316. - Total pages: 168
- Utah Arts Festival (June 23, 2017). "Graphic arts workshop: making comic books". Utah Arts Festival. Archived from the original on June 28, 2020.
- Wyatt, Edward (November 1, 2005). "The Strange Case of the Spoofer Captured by a Spoof". The New York Times. ISSN 1553-8095. OCLC 164552.
