= Elbert Martin =

Elbert Martin may refer to:

== People ==
- Elbert E. Martin (1881-1956) American lawyer and Vermont legislator
- E. J. Speed (Elbert Martin "E. J." Speed) (born 1995) American football player
- Elbert S. Martin (1829-1876) American journalist

== See also ==
- Martin (name)
