= Attempted assassination of Theodore Roosevelt =

1912 shooting in Milwaukee, Wisconsin, U.S.

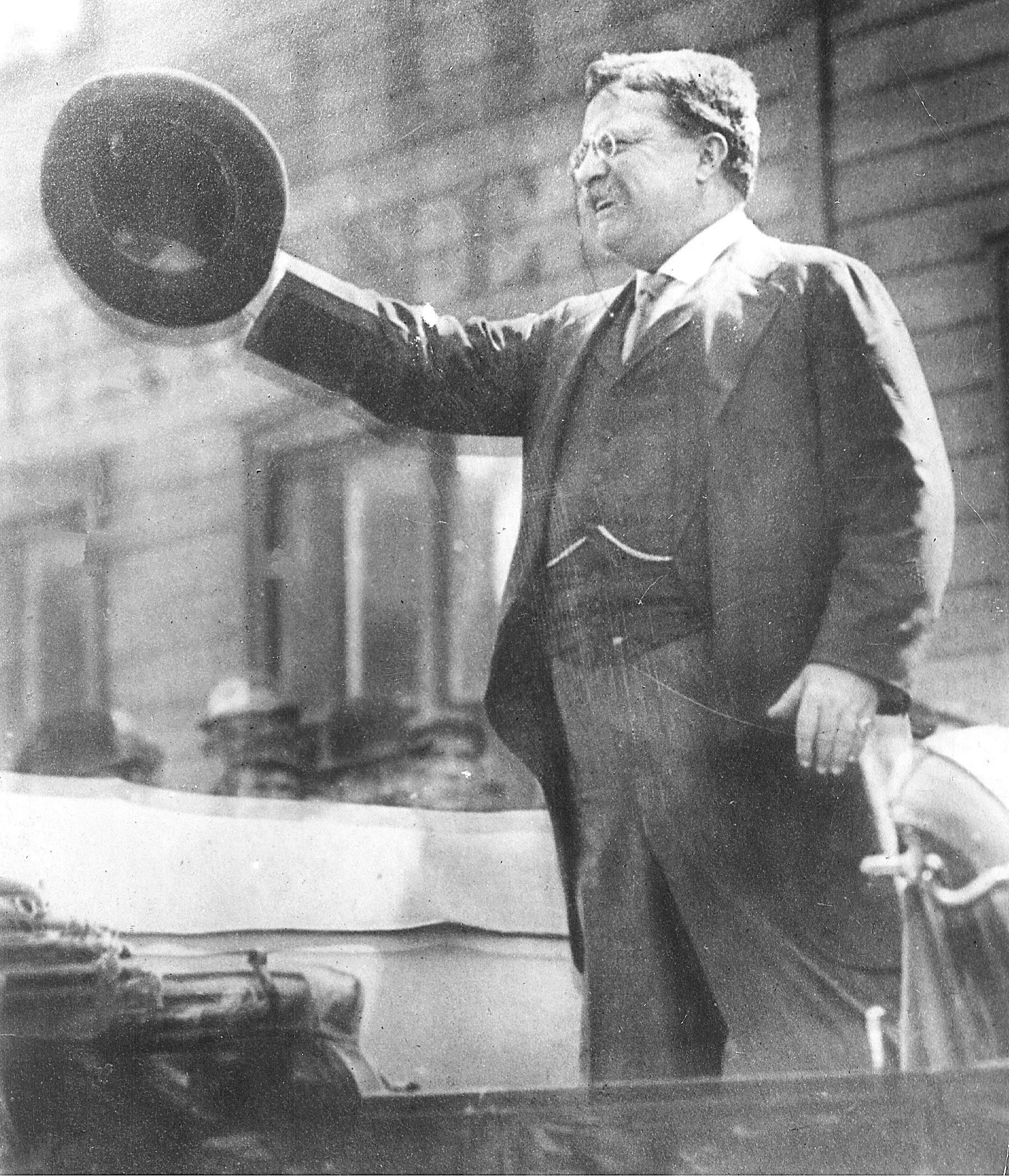
- Roosevelt speaks from a car shortly before being shot
- Location: 43°02′27″N 87°54′53″W; Outside the Gilpatrick Hotel, Milwaukee, Wisconsin, U.S.
- Date: October 14, 1912; 114 years ago
- Target: Theodore Roosevelt
- Attack type: Attempted assassination by shooting
- Weapon: .38-caliber Colt Police Positive Special revolver
- Deaths: None (Note: Roosevelt died on January 6, 1919. While his death was officially attributed to natural causes, it is unknown whether the long term effects of the bullet wound were an ancillary factor in hastening his demise.)
- Injuries: Theodore Roosevelt
- Perpetrator: John Schrank
- Motive: Mental illness
- Charges: Attempted murder
- Verdict: Not guilty by reason of insanity
- Sentence: Institutionalization

On October 14, 1912, former U.S. president Theodore Roosevelt survived an assassination attempt by John Schrank, a former saloonkeeper, while Roosevelt was campaigning for the presidency in Milwaukee, Wisconsin. Schrank's bullet lodged in Roosevelt's chest after penetrating Roosevelt's steel glasses case and passing through a 50-page-thick (single-folded) copy of his speech titled "Progressive Cause Greater Than Any Individual", which he was carrying in his jacket pocket. Schrank was immediately disarmed and captured; he might have been lynched had Roosevelt not shouted for Schrank to remain unharmed. Roosevelt assured the crowd that he was all right, then instructed the police to take charge of Schrank and ensure he was not harmed.

As an experienced hunter and anatomist, Roosevelt correctly concluded that since he was not coughing blood, the bullet had not reached his lung; he declined suggestions to go to the hospital immediately. Instead, he delivered his scheduled speech. His opening comments to the gathered crowd were, "Friends, I shall ask you to be as quiet as possible. I don't know whether you fully understand that I have just been shot—but it takes more than that to kill a bull moose."

Afterwards, probes and an x-ray showed that the bullet had lodged in Roosevelt's chest muscle, but did not penetrate the pleura. Since doctors concluded that it would be less dangerous to leave it in place than to attempt to remove it, Roosevelt carried the bullet with him for the rest of his life.

Both President William Howard Taft and Democratic nominee Woodrow Wilson suspended their campaigning until Roosevelt recovered and resumed his own. When asked if the shooting would affect his election campaign, he said to the reporter "I'm fit as a bull moose." The bull moose had become a symbol of both Roosevelt and the Progressive Party, often referred to as simply the Bull Moose Party, after Roosevelt boasted that he felt "strong as a bull moose" after losing the Republican nomination in June 1912. He spent two weeks recuperating before returning to the campaign trail. He later wrote to a friend about the bullet inside of his body: "I do not mind it any more than if it were in my waistcoat pocket."

The shooter, John Schrank, initially pleaded guilty to the charge of attempted murder, but the trial judge, unconvinced of Schrank's sanity, declined his plea and the case was brought to trial. Schrank was found not guilty by reason of insanity by the jury and was committed to indefinite institutionalization.

== Background ==
Theodore Roosevelt had ascended to the presidency following the assassination of William McKinley in 1901, serving the remaining 3 years 6 months of the term, and was then elected to a full term in the 1904 presidential election. He refused to run for another term in 1908, in accordance with the tradition established by George Washington that no one should serve more than two terms as US president (later codified in the 22nd Amendment). Roosevelt endorsed William Howard Taft, his secretary of war, at the 1908 Republican National Convention. Taft went on to win both the Republican nomination and the general election, but Roosevelt became dissatisfied with the work of his successor and in the next election sought to retake the presidency.

The 1912 presidential election campaign was characterized by a serious split in the Republican Party between the conservative wing under President Taft and the liberal/reform wing under former president Roosevelt. After a bitter confrontation at the 1912 Republican National Convention, Taft won renomination. Roosevelt led a bolt of his followers, who held a convention of their own and nominated him for president on the ticket of the Progressive Party, nicknamed the "Bull Moose Party". Taft and his supporters attacked Roosevelt for being power-hungry and seeking to break the tradition that U.S. Presidents only serve two terms in office.

== Assassination attempt ==
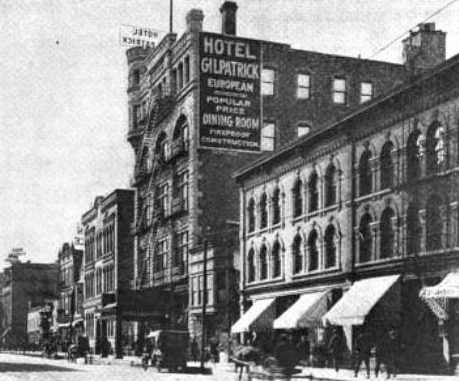
Gilpatrick Hotel

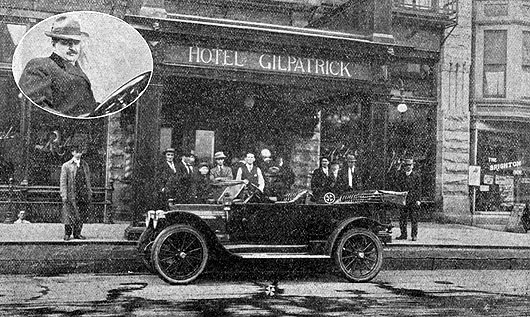
Automobile in which Roosevelt stood when shot

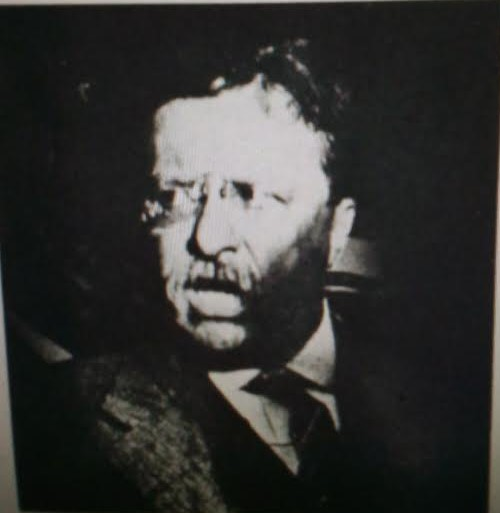
Theodore Roosevelt after being shot Oct 14, 1912

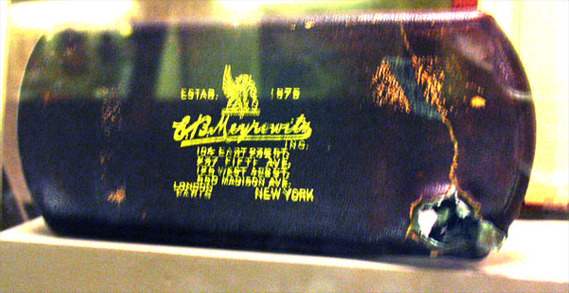
Theodore Roosevelt's eyeglasses case, penetrated by the bullet in the lower right

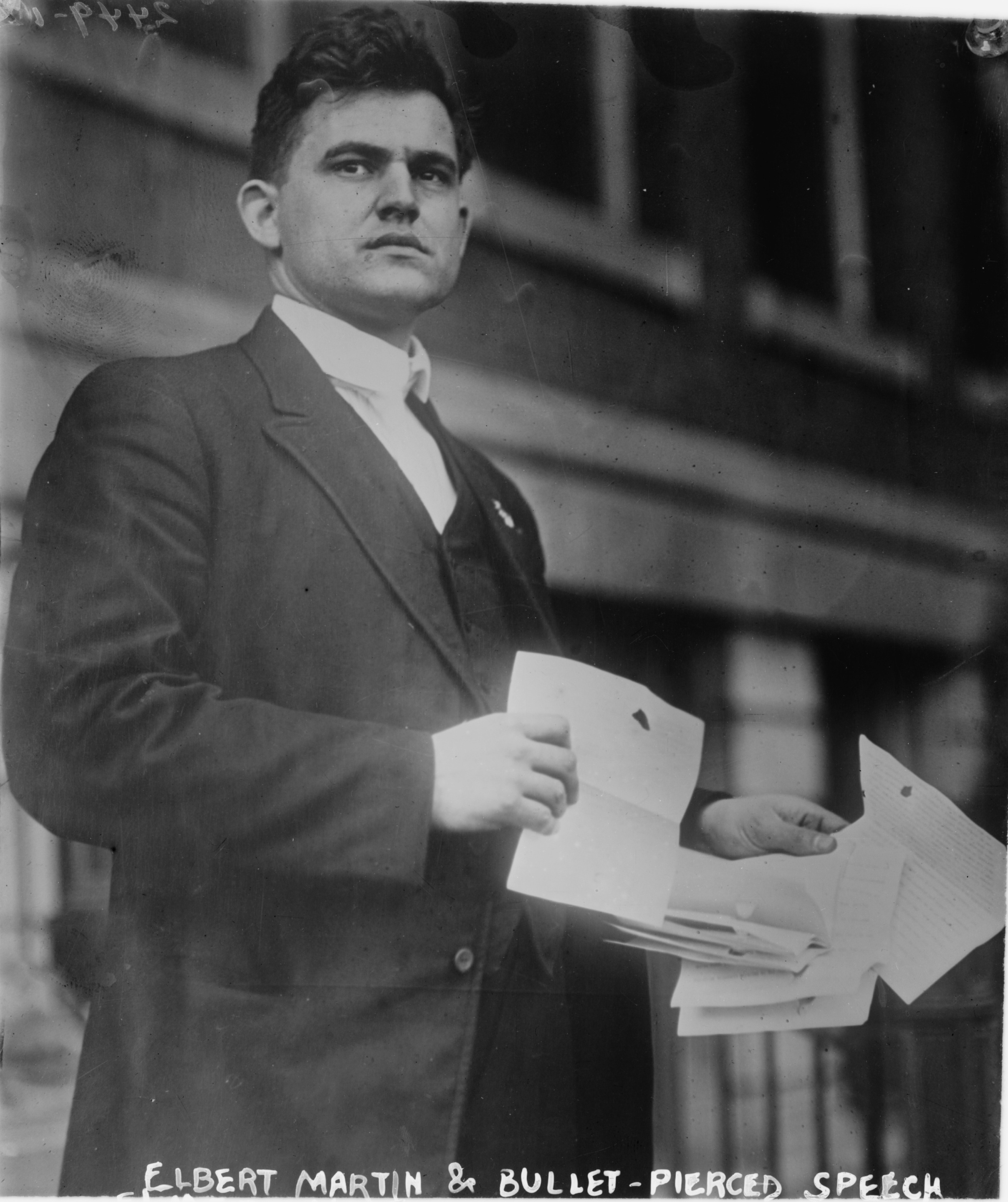
Elbert E. Martin, Theodore Roosevelt's stenographer, holding the speech with a bullet hole through the pages

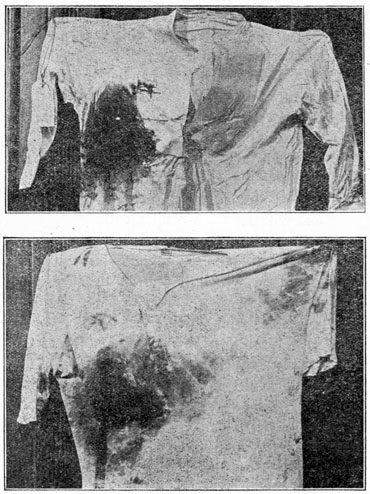
Theodore Roosevelt's blood stained shirt

According to documents found on Schrank after the attempted assassination, Schrank had written that the ghost of William McKinley came to him in a dream and told Schrank to avenge his death, pointing to a picture of Theodore Roosevelt. Ultimately, on October 14, 1912, while Roosevelt was campaigning in Milwaukee, Wisconsin, Schrank attempted to assassinate him.

Roosevelt was at the Gilpatrick Hotel, at a dinner provided by the hotel's owner, a supporter. He was scheduled to deliver a speech at the Milwaukee Auditorium. News had circulated that Roosevelt was at the hotel, and Schrank (who had been following Roosevelt from New Orleans to Milwaukee) went to the hotel. He had finished his meal and left the hotel to enter an open car. Roosevelt stood to acknowledge the cheering of the assembled crowd, and Schrank acted, firing one shot from a Model 1905 Colt Police Positive Pistol # 58714.

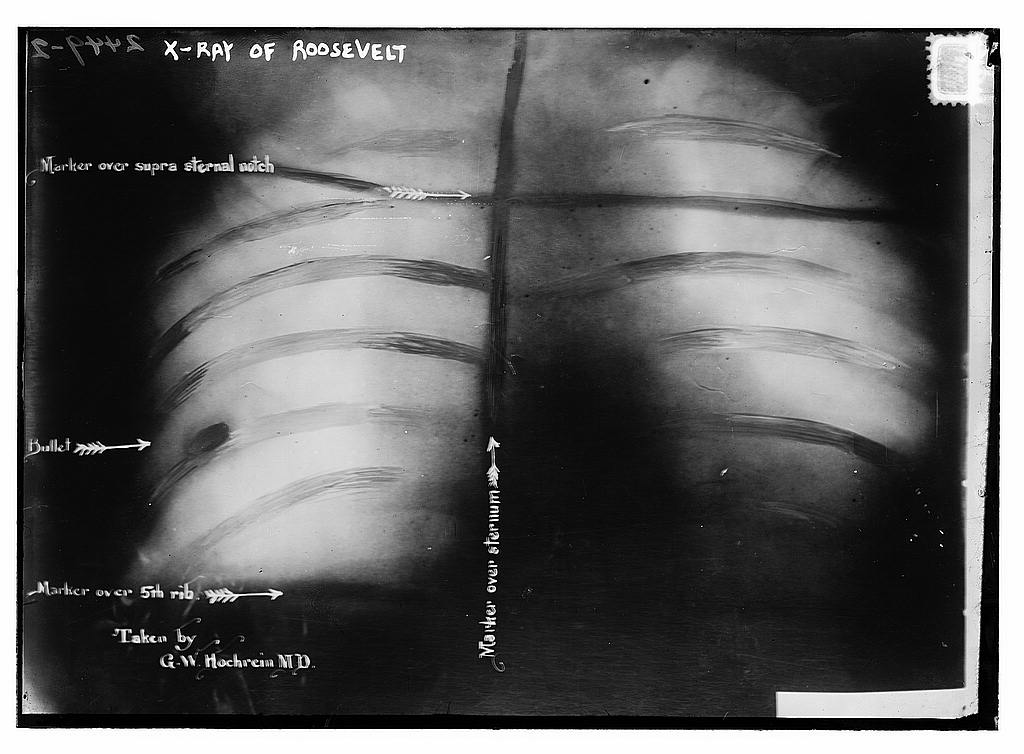
X-Ray of Schrank's bullet in Roosevelt's chest

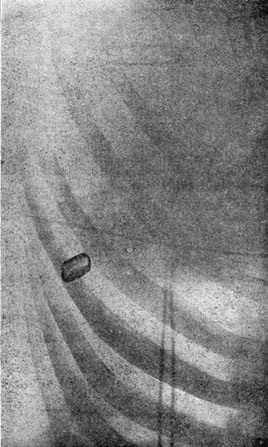
Bullet lodged in Theodore Roosevelt's side

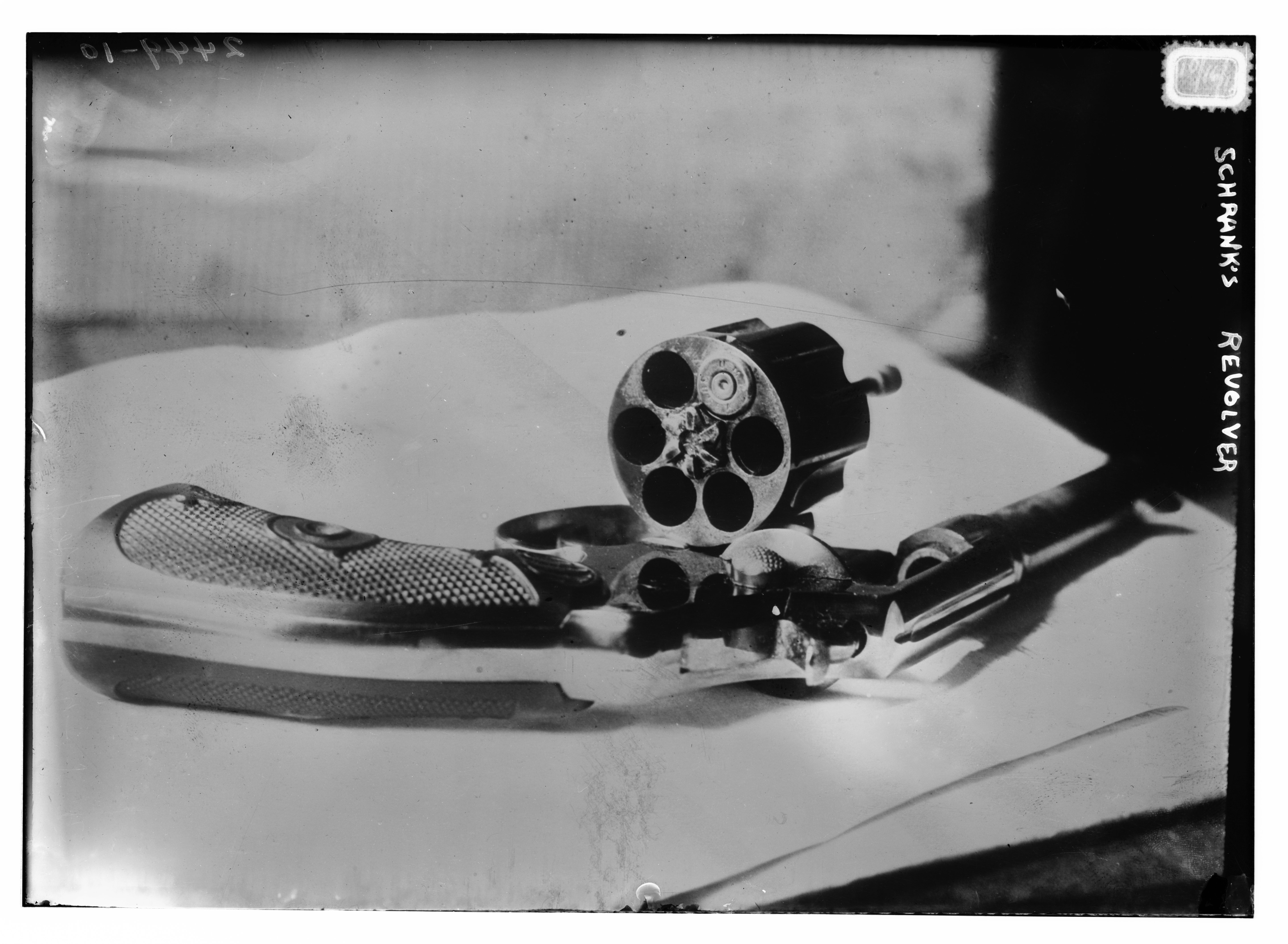
The .38-caliber Colt Police Positive Special revolver that Schrank used to shoot Roosevelt

Schrank did shoot Roosevelt, but the bullet lodged in Roosevelt's chest only after hitting both his steel eyeglass case and a 50-page copy of his speech titled "Progressive Cause Greater Than Any Individual", which he was carrying in his jacket pocket. As onlookers gasped and screamed, Elbert E. Martin, one of Roosevelt's secretaries and an ex-football player, was the first to react, leaping at Schrank, wrestling him to the ground and seizing his gun. A. O. Girard, a former Rough Rider and Roosevelt's bodyguard, and several policemen were upon Schrank at the same moment. Roosevelt stumbled, but straightened himself, and again raised his hat, with a reassuring smile upon his face. His aide, Harry Cochems, asked Roosevelt if he was hit, and Roosevelt simply said assuredly, "He pinked me, Harry."

As Schrank was subdued and held up on his feet, the crowd went into a frenzy. Several of the closest men around Schrank began pummeling him, and others screamed "kill him!", and "hang him!". Roosevelt, seeing what was happening, shouted to the crowd, "Don't hurt him. Bring him here. I want to see him." The crowd, hearing Roosevelt's voice, looked at Roosevelt, astonished to see him standing up and talking. A member asked, "Is he okay?"; Roosevelt, with a reassuring smile, waved his hat in the air and said, "I'm all right, I'm all right." In relief, the crowd erupted in cheers, enabling four policemen to gain their way into the crowd and hold Schrank.

Roosevelt ordered, "Bring him to me." Schrank was led to Roosevelt, and the two men looked into each other's eyes. Putting his hands on Schrank's head so he could look at him, and to determine if he had seen him before, Roosevelt said to Schrank, "What did you do it for?" Getting no response, he said, "Oh, what's the use? Turn him over to the police." As police held Schrank, Roosevelt looked down at him, and said, "You poor creature." Roosevelt ordered, "Officers, take charge of him, and see that there is no violence done to him." Girard and another officer led Schrank away into the hotel as the crowd booed at him and applauded for Roosevelt, abiding by his wishes. Roosevelt gave another reassuring tip of the hat to the crowd before he took off in his car. Schrank was led into the kitchen where he was turned over to the local police.

Roosevelt, as an experienced hunter and anatomist, correctly concluded that since he was not coughing blood, the bullet had not reached his lung, and he declined suggestions to go to the hospital immediately. Instead, he delivered his scheduled speech with blood seeping into his shirt. He spoke for 50 minutes before completing his speech and accepting medical attention. His opening comments to the gathered crowd were, "Ladies and gentlemen, I don't know whether you fully understand that I have just been shot, but it takes more than that to kill a bull moose."

Afterwards, probes and an x-ray showed that the bullet had lodged in Roosevelt's chest muscle, but did not penetrate the pleura. Doctors concluded that it would be less dangerous to leave it in place than to attempt to remove it, probably remembering what had happened to Roosevelt's immediate predecessor who died after the bullet's wound got infected, and Roosevelt carried the bullet with him for the rest of his life. In later years, when asked about the bullet inside him, Roosevelt would say, "I do not mind it any more than if it were in my waistcoat pocket."

Both Taft and Democratic nominee Woodrow Wilson suspended their own campaigning until Roosevelt recovered and resumed his. When asked if the shooting would affect his election campaign, he said to the reporter, "I'm fit as a bull moose." Roosevelt made only two more speeches in the campaign. Although Roosevelt won more votes and electoral votes than Taft, Wilson bested both of them to win the presidency.

== Perpetrator ==
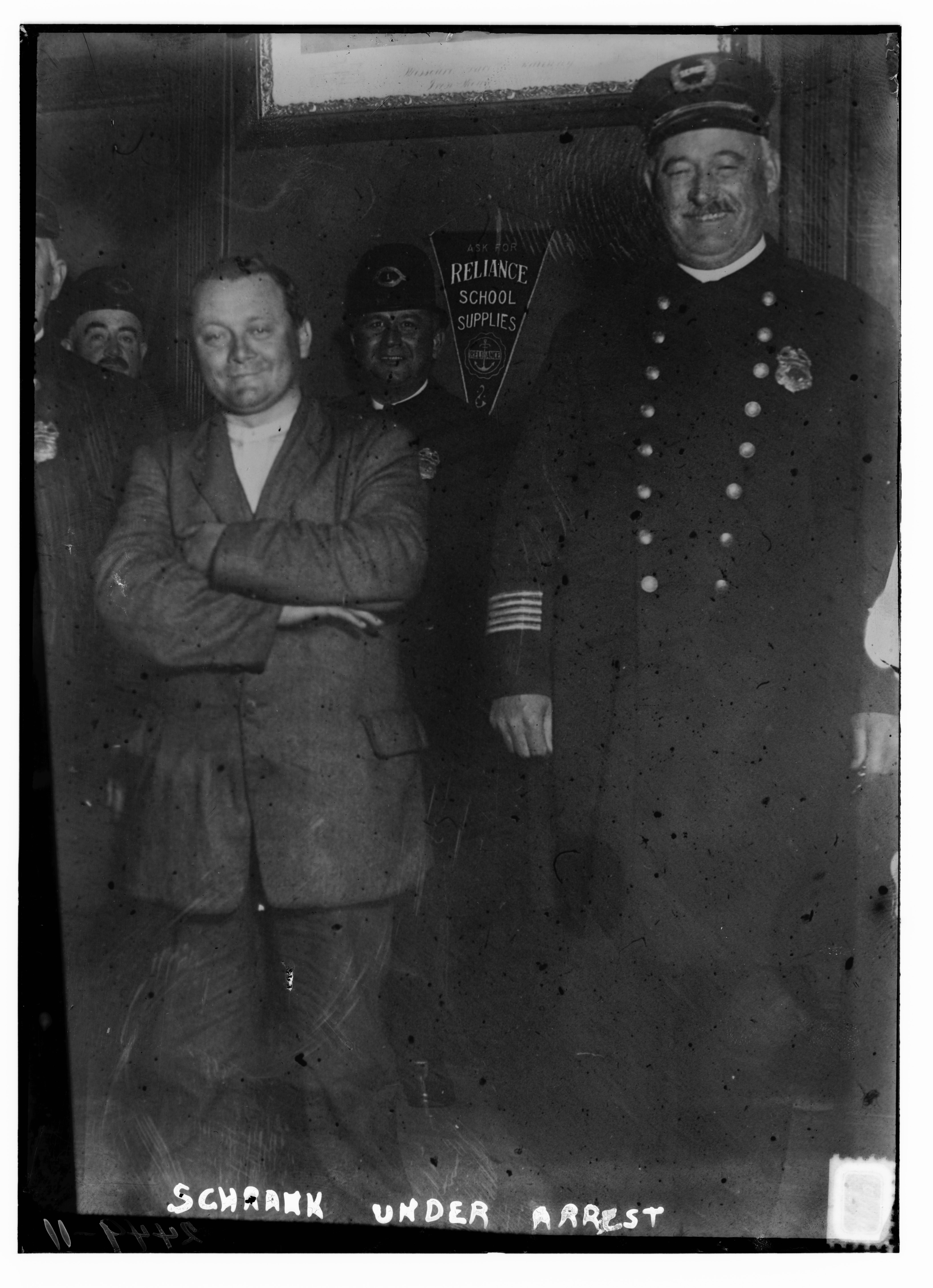
John Schrank under arrest

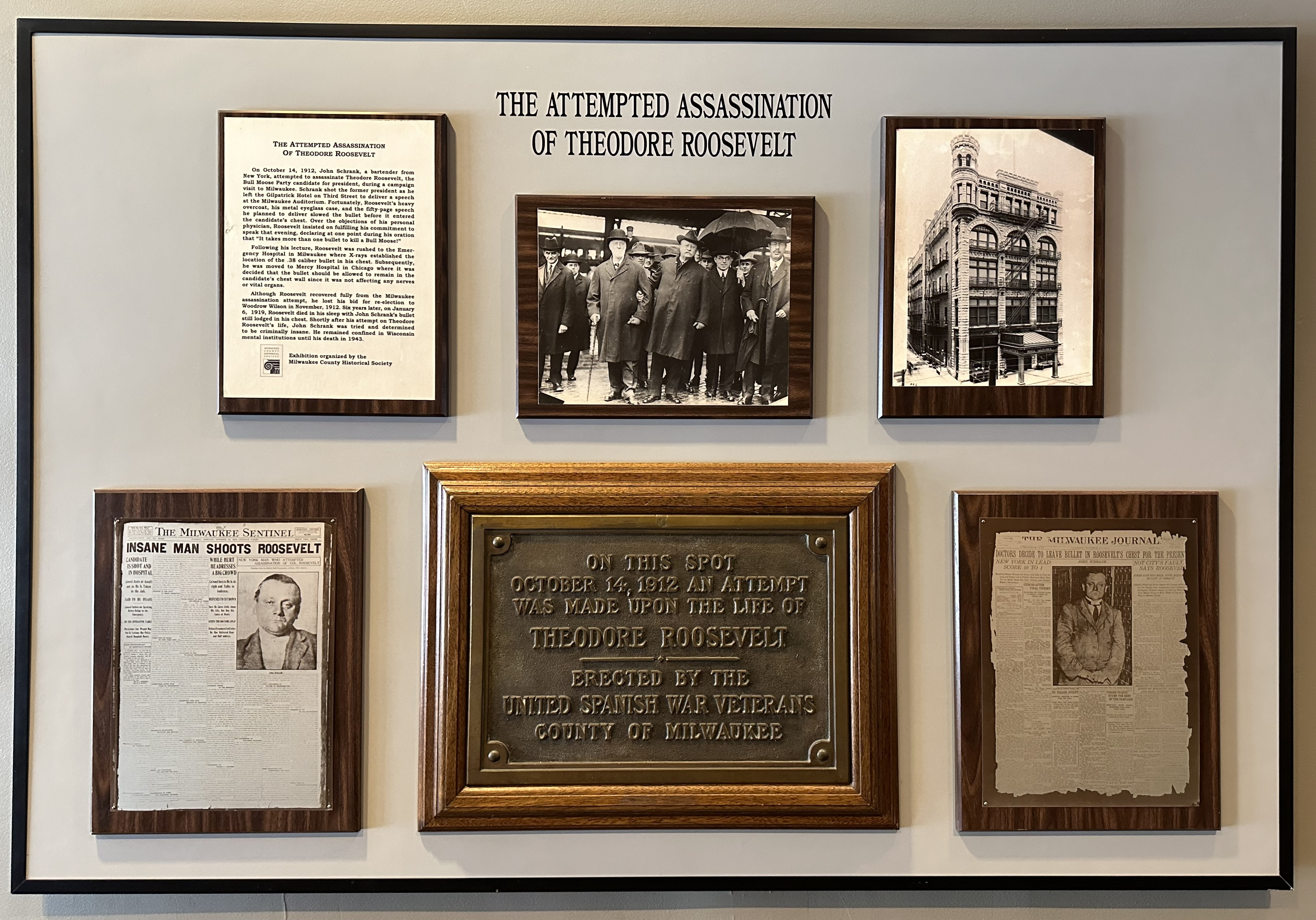
Memorial for the Attempted assassination of Theodore Roosevelt at the Hyatt Regency Milwaukee

The attempt on Roosevelt's life was perpetrated by John Schrank, a Bavarian-born saloonkeeper from New York. Schrank was born in Erding, Bavaria, on March 5, 1876. He emigrated to the U.S. at the age of 9. His parents died soon after, leaving Schrank to work for his uncle, a New York tavern owner and landlord. Upon their deaths, Schrank's aunt and uncle left him valuable properties, with the expectation that Schrank could live a quiet and peaceful life. Schrank was heartbroken, not just because he had lost his second set of parents, but also because his first and only girlfriend Emily Ziegler had died in the General Slocum disaster on New York's East River. Schrank sold the properties, and drifted around the East Coast for years. He became profoundly religious, and a fluent Bible scholar, whose debating skills were well known around his neighborhood's watering holes and public parks. He wrote spare and vivid poetry. He spent a great deal of time walking around city streets at night but caused no documented trouble.

== Aftermath and motives ==
Schrank was arrested, pleaded guilty and held on US$7,500 (equivalent to $250,216 in 2025) bail. Sergent Robert Flood asked him why he did it, and he said, "I did it because I was opposed to the third term. Don't talk to me I will not say anything until tomorrow, for I want to sleep." The Milwaukee Sentinel published a Newspaper extra on October 15, 1912, with the headline, "Insane Man Shoots Roosevelt".

Soon after the assassination attempt, psychologists examined Schrank and reported that he had "insane delusions, grandiose in character," declaring him to be insane. At his trial, the would-be assassin claimed that William McKinley's ghost had visited him in a dream and told him to avenge his assassination by killing Roosevelt. Schrank was committed to the Central State Hospital for the Criminally Insane in Waupun, Wisconsin, in 1914. He remained there for 29 more years, until he died on September 15, 1943, of bronchial pneumonia. His body was donated to the medical school at Marquette University (now the Medical College of Wisconsin) for anatomical dissection.

Theodore Roosevelt opposed Schrank's insanity claims. Roosevelt noted that Schrank, who had started following him in Louisiana, had the good sense to wait until he got to Wisconsin to attempt the murder, because Schrank probably would have gotten lynched if he had attempted the murder in a Southern state (as it was, he almost got lynched even in Wisconsin), and because Schrank would have been executed in a Southern state even if he had not been lynched.

An episode of the television series You Are There about the 1912 assassination attempt on Theodore Roosevelt was titled "The Attempt to Assassinate Theodore Roosevelt (October 14, 1912)". It first aired on June 2, 1957.

For the 100th anniversary of the attempted assassination Historic Milwaukee Inc. reenacted the assassination attempt. The event was attended by Mayor Tom Barrett and took place on Sunday, October 14, 2012, in front of the Hyatt Regency Milwaukee, 333 W. Kilbourn Ave.

== Archive ==
While John F. Schrank was committed, he wrote a number of letters to the doctor he was consulting at the mental hospital, Adin Sherman. The University of North Carolina Wilmington possesses twenty of them. The letters are dated between 1914 and 1918. The accession number in the Manuscripts Collection is 148.

The Milwaukee Public Library contains a collection of court exhibits and transcripts from Schrank's trial. It is Local History Manuscript Collection 43.

== See also ==
- List of United States presidential assassination attempts and plots
