= Miller High Life Theatre =

Theatre in Milwaukee, Wisconsin

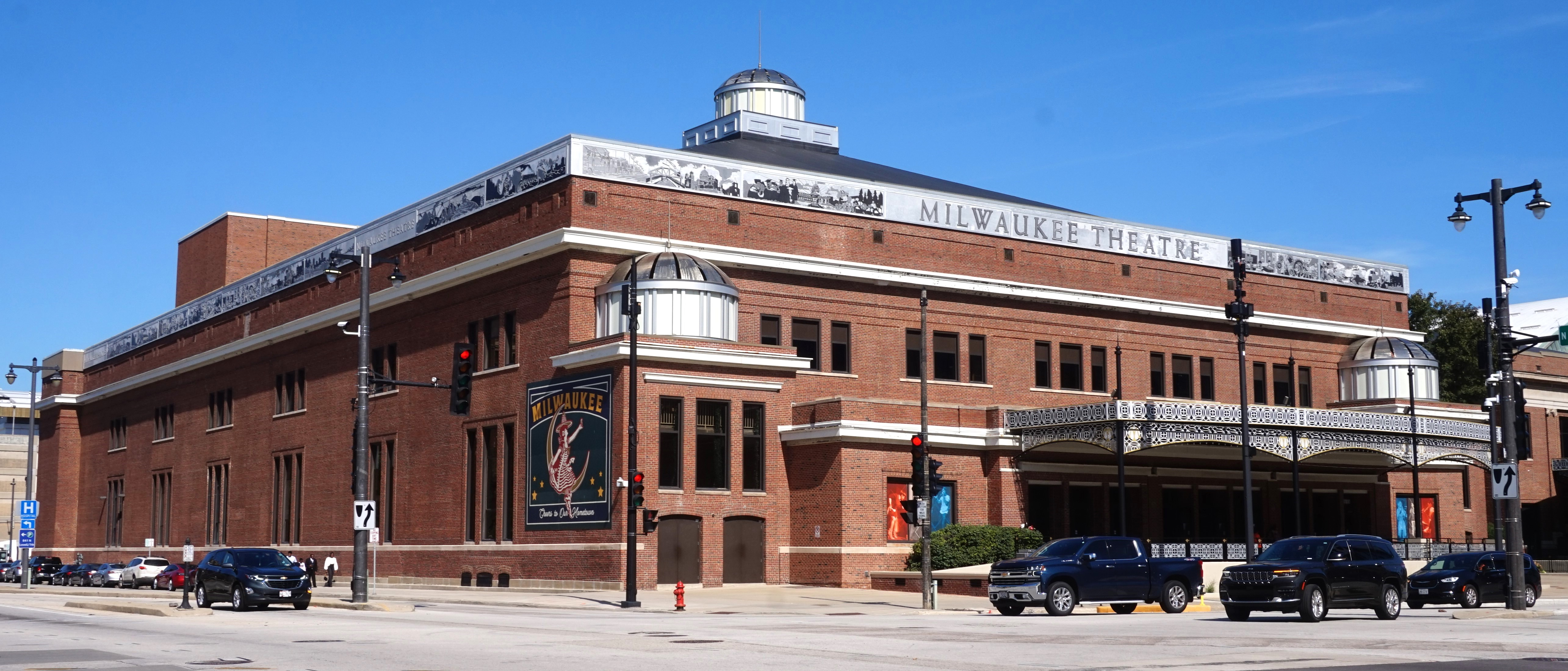
- Front facade of the theater, seen in 2014
- Interactive map of Miller High Life Theatre
- Former names: Milwaukee Auditorium (1909-2003); Milwaukee Theatre (2003-2017)
- Address: 500 West Kilbourn Avenue; Milwaukee; United States
- Coordinates: 43.041759°N 87.917404°W
- Owner: Wisconsin Center District
- Operator: Wisconsin Center District
- Capacity: 4,086
- Public transit: MCTS

Construction
- Opened: September 21, 1909
- Renovated: 1978, 2003
- Closed: 2001–2003
- Reopened: November 7, 2003
- Architect: Alfred Clas

Tenant
- Milwaukee Wave (AISA) (1984–1988)

Website
- www.milwaukeetheatre.com

Miller High Life Theatre (previously Milwaukee Theatre and originally Milwaukee Auditorium) is a theatre located in Milwaukee, Wisconsin. The building was extensively renovated between 2001 and 2003, at which point its name changed to the Milwaukee Theatre. A naming rights deal changed its name in 2017 to the Miller High Life Theatre. It seats 4,086 people and can be configured into a more intimate venue that seats 2,500. It is located at 500 W. Kilbourn Avenue in downtown Milwaukee.

== Milwaukee Auditorium ==
The Milwaukee Auditorium was built in 1909, in a place formerly occupied by the Milwaukee Industrial Exposition Building, which had been destroyed by fire in 1905. The Milwaukee Auditorium held 13,520 people, and had 104,952 square feet (9,750.4 m^{2}) of exhibition space. The cornerstone was laid on August 1, 1908, and the building was dedicated on September 21, 1909. Elizabeth Plankinton donated a pipe organ.

Historical uses included concerts, circuses, political rallies and sports events. For decades the Milwaukee Auditorium boasted its own orchestra, and hosted touring concerts from such historic notables as John Philip Sousa and Enrico Caruso to contemporary stars like Barry Manilow, Nirvana, Marilyn Manson, ABBA, the Carpenters, and Prince. Sitting Presidents from Taft to Clinton delivered important policy addresses in the Auditorium.

On October 14, 1912, former president and then current presidential candidate Theodore Roosevelt delivered a speech at the Milwaukee Auditorium shortly after a failed assassination attempt on him across the street from the Auditorium at the Gilpatrick Hotel, by a saloonkeeper named John Flammang Schrank. Schrank shot Roosevelt, but the bullet lodged in Roosevelt's chest only after hitting both his steel eyeglass case and a 50-page text of his campaign speech titled "Progressive Cause Greater Than Any Individual", folded over twice in Roosevelt's breast pocket. Schrank was immediately disarmed, captured and might have been lynched had Roosevelt not shouted for Schrank to remain unharmed. Roosevelt assured the crowd he was all right, then ordered police to take charge of Schrank and to make sure no violence was done to him.

Roosevelt, as an experienced hunter and anatomist, correctly concluded that since he was not coughing blood, the bullet had not reached his lung, and he declined to go to the hospital immediately. Instead, he delivered his scheduled speech with blood seeping into his shirt. He spoke for 90 minutes before completing his speech and accepting medical attention. His opening comments to the gathered crowd were, "Ladies and gentlemen, I don't know whether you fully understand that I have just been shot, but it takes more than that to kill a Bull Moose."

Afterwards, probes and an x-ray showed that the bullet had lodged in Roosevelt's chest muscle, but did not penetrate the pleura. Doctors concluded that it would be less dangerous to leave it in place than to attempt to remove it, and Roosevelt carried the bullet with him for the rest of his life.

Structural and cosmetic improvements were made throughout the Auditorium's life, both before and after a major 1978 renovation brought in modern heating and air conditioning, restored architectural details and overall physical upgrades. However, by the time it was acquired by the new Wisconsin Center District in 1995, the Auditorium's continued viability was questioned – until a 20-day run of Riverdance, in 1999, shattered sales records and indicated that a market existed for a venue of its size.

== Milwaukee Theatre ==
Beginning in October 2001, the Auditorium was converted into a theater. The project, which cost $41.9 million, was completed on November 7, 2003.

In January 2016, MillerCoors, a joint venture between the Molson family through their MolsonCoors Beverage Company and South African Breweries, purchased naming rights from the Wisconsin Center District for $1.85 million. On April 25, 2017, the name officially changed from the Milwaukee Theatre to the Miller High Life Theatre, which then had become controlled by Molson following its acquisition of the Miller brands after InBev acquired South African Breweries.

Since opening, The Miller High Life Theatre has hosted a wide range of convention, corporate, religious and political assemblies as well as Broadway musicals and other entertainment.

== Notable events ==
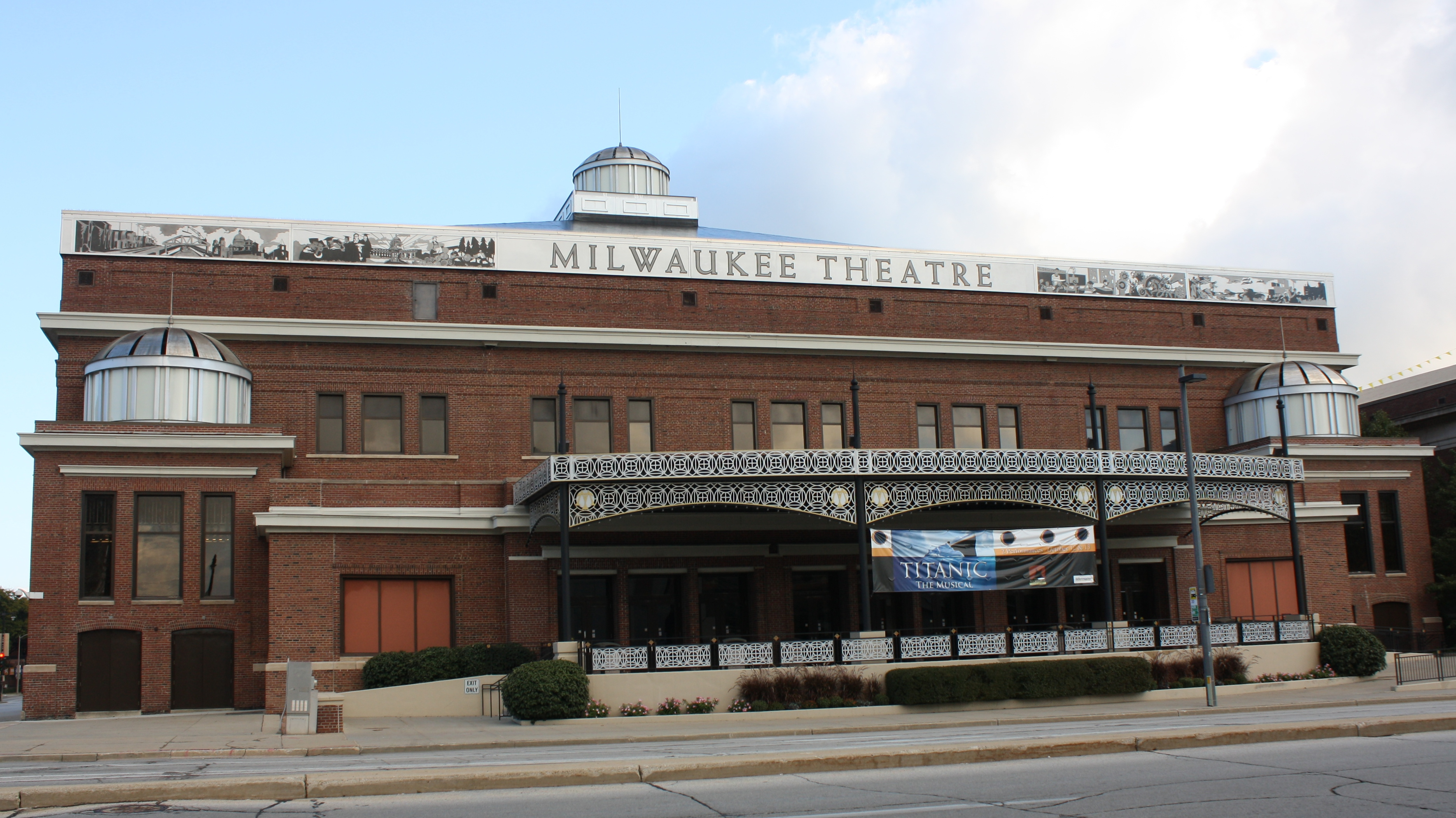
Ground level

- President William Howard Taft - October 27, 1911
- Former President and Presidential candidate Theodore Roosevelt - October 14, 1912 (Roosevelt shot before speech)
- President Woodrow Wilson - January 31, 1916
- Enrico Caruso - May 13, 1919
- John Philip Sousa - November 8, 1924 and September 21, 1929
- Premier of Lincolnshire Posy, an important composition for wind band by Percy Grainger performed at the American Bandmasters Association's 8th annual convention, March 7, 1937
- Milwaukee Auditorium Fire - December 24, 1937
- Presidential candidate Wendell Willkie - March 27, 1944
- West German Chancellor Konrad Adenauer, June 15, 1956
- Liberace - August 2, 1957
- Van Cliburn with the Milwaukee Symphony Orchestra - January 30, 1959
- Presidential candidate John F. Kennedy - October 23, 1960
- Martin Luther King Jr. - April 27, 1964
- The Beach Boys - July 19, 1964, with The Kingsmen
- Johnny Cash - August 1, 1964 and October 29, 1973
- Ray Charles - October 11, 1964
- The Rolling Stones - November 11, 1964, with The Ladybirds
- Louis Armstrong - November 13, 1964
- The Dave Clark Five - December 15, 1964, December 11, 1965, and July 5, 1966
- The Jimi Hendrix Experience - May 1, 1970, with Oz
- The Carpenters - October 24, 1972
- Queen - March 1, 1976 and January 13, 1977, with Cheap Trick
- Jackson Browne - November 7, 1976
- Kiss - February 1 and 2, 1977
- Genesis - February 10, 1977
- Bruce Springsteen and the E Street Band - February 22, 1977
- Bob Marley & The Wailers - November 12, 1979
- Frank Zappa - September 27, 1977, November 25, 1980, and December 1, 1981
- ABBA - September 29, 1979
- The Grateful Dead - February 4, 1978 and May 30, 1980
- Dire Straits - August 2, 1985
- Presidential candidate Michael Dukakis - November 1, 1988
- WCW SuperBrawl II - February 29, 1992
- Presidential candidate George W. Bush - October 23, 2000
- Presidential candidate Ralph Nader - November 1, 2000
- Prince & The New Power Generation - November 18, 2000
- Kenny Rogers - November 25, 2000
- Dolly Parton - October 30, 2005
- Presidential Candidate Barack Obama - April 16, 2007
- The Wiggles - November 3, 2007 (2 shows)
- James Taylor - May 9, 2009
- The Milwaukee Blues Festival - March 13, 2010 and March 9, 2012
- Janet Jackson - August 14, 2011
- Mindless Behavior - The #1 Girl Tour - July 27, 2012
- The fourth 2016 Republican Party presidential debate sponsored by Fox Business Network and the Wall Street Journal - November 10, 2015
- Presidential candidate Donald Trump - April 4, 2016.
- Michelle Obama - March 14, 2019
- YouTube personnel Daniel Howell (danisnotonfire) and Phil Lester (AmazingPhil) for their theatrical show "The Amazing Tour is Not On Fire". - May 29, 2016
- Mariah Carey - March 15, 2019
- Diana Ross - September 10, 2023

== Sources ==
- Hampton (1909). Hampton's Magazine. Broadway Magazine, Incorporated.
