= Elbert E. Martin =

American stenographer (1881–1956)

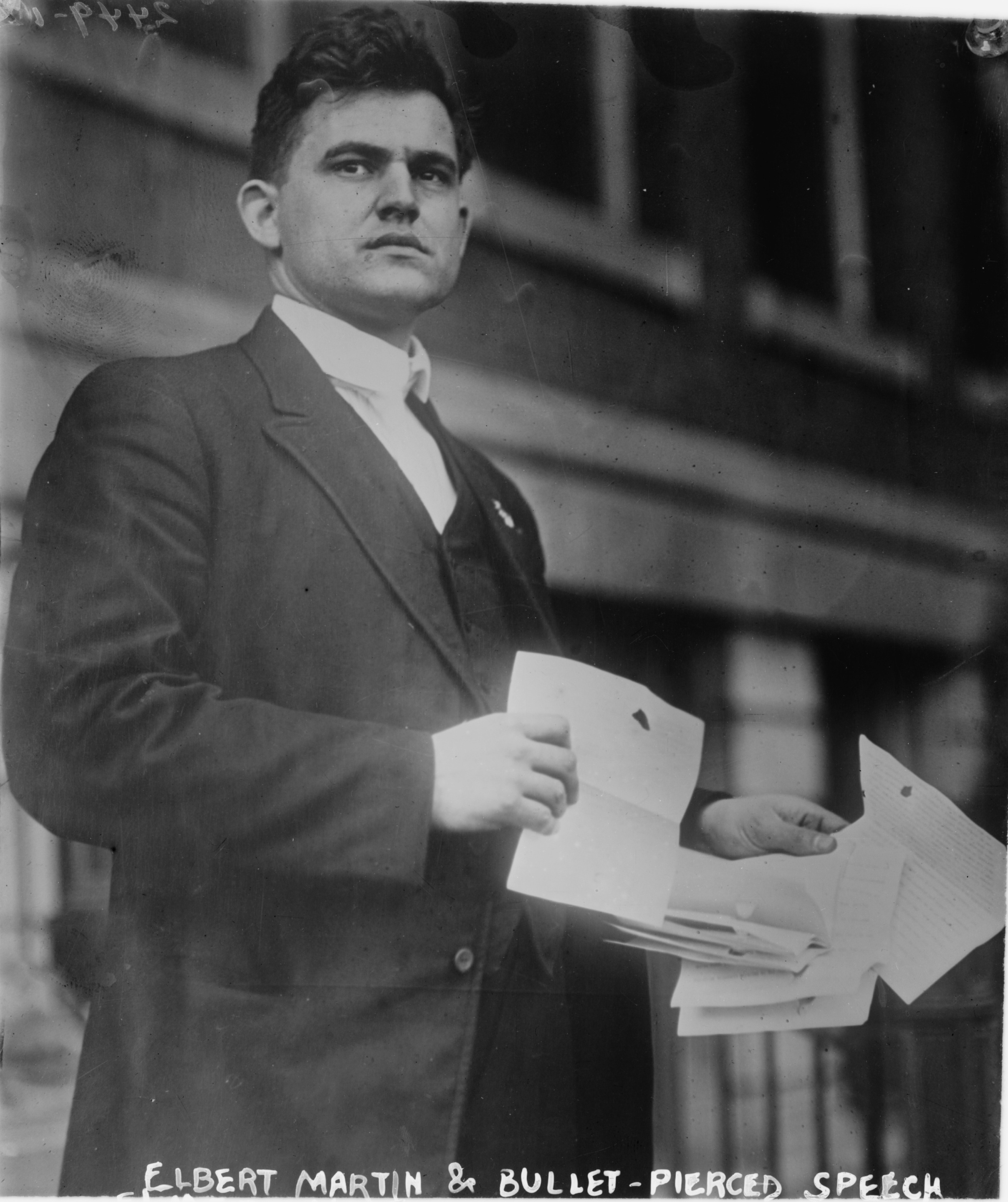
- Martin holding Theodore Roosevelt's speech with a bullet hole (1912)

Member of the Vermont House of Representatives
- In office January 6, 1943 – January 7, 1953

Personal details
- Born: Elbert Eli Martin; January 22, 1881 Manchester, New Hampshire, U.S.
- Died: September 1, 1956 (aged 75) Salmon, Idaho, U.S.
- Party: Republican
- Occupation: Lawyer; Legislator
- Known for: Captured would-be assassin of Theodore Roosevelt

Elbert Eli Martin (January 22, 1881 – September 1, 1956) was an American stenographer for President Theodore Roosevelt. He is known for tackling shooter John Schrank during the attempted assassination of Roosevelt. Martin went on to serve in the Vermont General Assembly.

== Early life ==
Elbert Martin was born in Manchester, New Hampshire. He went to high school in Rhinelander, Wisconsin and graduated from Rhinelander High School, where he was an American football player. After high school, he moved to Michigan and took classes at Big Rapids Business College, where he also played football. In 1912, he graduated from the Detroit College of Law with a law degree.

== Career ==
Martin moved to New York City and, on August 16, 1912, began working for Theodore Roosevelt as a stenographer; because of his size and background in football, he was also an unofficial bodyguard for Roosevelt while he was campaigning for President of the United States. In Saginaw, Michigan, he was accompanying Roosevelt when he pushed a man into the gutter; Roosevelt thought that Martin was too rough with people at times.

=== Assassination attempt ===
On October 14, 1912, Martin accompanied Theodore Roosevelt to Milwaukee, Wisconsin, and found himself in the middle of an assassination attempt on the former president. Leaving the Gilpatrick Hotel, Roosevelt walked outside and climbed into a waiting convertible. When Martin climbed into the vehicle, a man named John Schrank stepped forward and shot Roosevelt. Martin overpowered the shooter just as the shot hit Roosevelt's chest. He grabbed Schrank around his neck and took his gun away before he could take a second shot. Martin then dragged the man near Roosevelt and said, "Here he is. Look at him Colonel." Schrank had tried to get off a second shot, but Martin's quick action in tackling Schrank and redirecting the weapon may have saved Roosevelt's life. The Boston Evening Transcript called Martin a "Hero of Occasion". Roosevelt gave Martin the assassin's gun along with the spent bullet casing, five bullets, and a gold watch inscribed, "To Elbert E. Martin from Theodore Roosevelt in Remembrance of October 14, 1912". Roosevelt was not more seriously wounded because the bullet first had to pass through his fifty-page speech (which had been folded in half) and Roosevelt's spectacle case. Additionally, Martin did not allow the shooter to take a second shot.

== Personal life ==
Martin was married in the summer of 1912; the couple made their home in New York City and had a daughter, later moving to Vermont, Detroit, and Idaho. In the 1940s, Martin worked for a Detroit law firm. Later, he moved to Vermont and went on to serve 10 years in the Vermont General Assembly, representing the town of Putney. He also worked as a publicity director and legal advisor for Vanderbilt Hotels. Martin died September 1, 1956, at Steele Memorial Hospital in Salmon, Idaho, after five weeks of hospitalization. His funeral was at Jones Funeral Home, and he was buried in Salmon.
