= John Schrank =

Attempted assassin of Theodore Roosevelt (1876–1943)

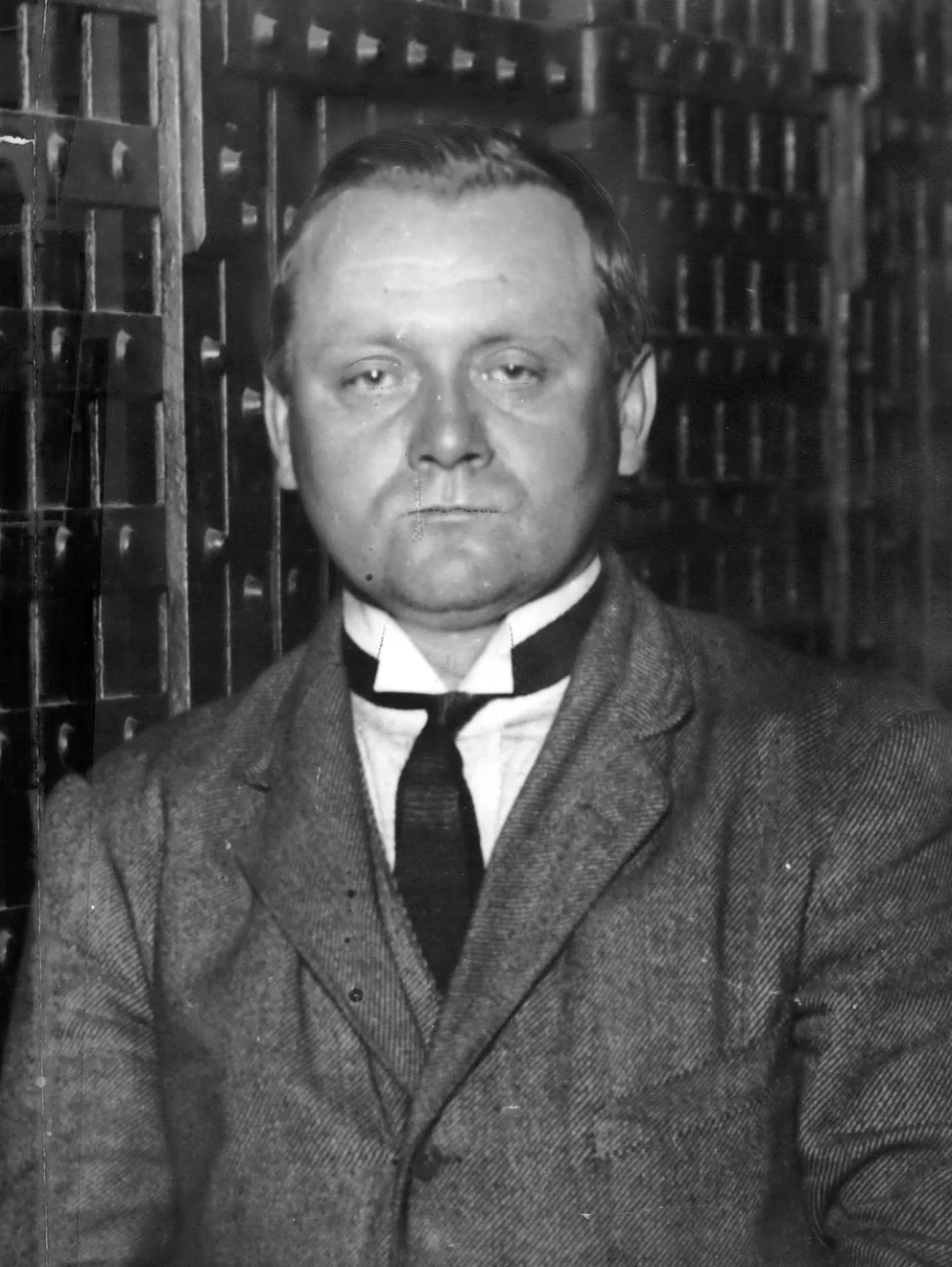
- Schrank in 1912
- Born: Johann Nepomuk Schrank; March 5, 1876; Erding, Kingdom of Bavaria, German Empire
- Died: September 15, 1943 (aged 67); Waupun, Wisconsin, U.S.
- Other names: John Flamming; John Flamming Schrank
- Citizenship: German (1876–1889); American (1897–1943)
- Occupation: Saloonkeeper
- Known for: Attempted assassination of Theodore Roosevelt

John Flammang Schrank (born Johann Nepomuk Schrank; March 5, 1876 – September 15, 1943) was a German-American tavern owner who attempted to assassinate former President Theodore Roosevelt outside of the Gilpatrick Hotel in Milwaukee on October 14, 1912.

Schrank claimed to have experienced visions of the ghost of assassinated U.S. President William McKinley, telling Schrank that Roosevelt was his murderer, and that Schrank needed to avenge his death, as well as prevent Roosevelt from being elected to a third term as President of the United States. His shot hit Roosevelt in the chest at very close range, but the assassination attempt was not successful; he was immediately arrested, and was later adjudicated insane.

When he was brought before Judge August C. Backus in Milwaukee Municipal Court he quickly pleaded guilty to shooting Roosevelt. Judge Backus did not accept the guilty plea, and appointed a panel to determine if Schrank was mentally fit. The panel decided that Schrank was insane, and in November 1912 he was committed to the Central State Hospital for the Criminally Insane for 31 years until his death.

== Background ==
=== Early life ===
Johann Nepomuk Schrank was born in Erding, Kingdom of Bavaria, on March 5, 1876, to carpenters Michael and Katharina Schrank (née Auer). The Herald-Press stated that his birth certificate listed him as John Nepomuk Schrank while a letter from Friedrich Herbig, the mayor of Erding from 1905 to 1929, gave his birth name as Johann Nepomuk Schrank. He had four siblings, two of whom died in infancy. His maternal aunt, Anna Binghammer, suffered from persecutory delusions and was committed to an asylum, Königlich Bayerische Heil- und Pflegeeinrichtung für Nervenkranke, in Gabersee, where she died on November 21, 1904, from encephalomalacia. The Herald-Press also reported that Schrank's paternal grandfather was recorded as having suffered a sudden mental decline and died shortly after.

When Schrank was three, his father Michael died from consumption at the age of 38. His mother Katharina subsequently shuffled between homes, sometimes living with her brother Joseph Auer and his family and sometimes with her elderly parents, until Schrank was nine years old. Joseph acted as a paternal substitute for Schrank in his childhood, showing him how to tend to the vegetable garden and helping with his school work. He was raised as a Roman Catholic and attended public school in Bavaria from the ages of seven to twelve, where he was noted to be an "outstanding student".

In the fall of 1889, Schrank, aged twelve, was informally adopted by his paternal aunt Anne Flamming (née Anna Schrank) and her Luxembourg German husband Dominick Flamming (also known as Dominikus Flamang); they were visiting from the United States, to which they had both immigrated in the 1850s. The adoption agreement was made because the Auer family were already caring for four other children (Schrank's surviving brother and sister, as well as his two cousins, Joseph's daughters) and the middle-aged Flammings had no children of their own. He accompanied them on their return trip from Bremerhaven on the SS Fulda, being listed as their son on the passenger list, (Note: Among other conflicting reports, including that Schrank came to America alone at the age of nine; the passenger list entry has led to confusion regarding the circumstances around Schrank's immigration. Misreadings of German Kurrent-written records may have contributed to mistranslations. Other sources state that Schrank was accompanied by both his parents, who later died, and that he was then taken in by his aunt and uncle, but his biological mother was listed as alive during her son's 1912 trial.) and arrived in Manhattan, New York, on October 22, 1889.

=== Life in the United States ===
During his early years in America, Schrank was known as John Flamming, having anglicized his original first name Johann to the English equivalent and taken on the last name of his foster parents, (Note: They went by the alternate spelling Flammang in the United States, which was eventually adopted by Schrank as well.) with whom he lived in a tenement in the Kleindeutschland neighborhood in Lower East Side. He learned English at night classes for the next four years, gaining a keen interest in history and American politics through the newspapers and other literature he read for his courses and began writing poetry in both German and English at 15. Schrank worked at his aunt and uncle's tavern starting at the age of twelve, first as a bus boy and later as a bartender. Schrank became a lapsed Catholic, partially because his foster parents did not attend church, writing "I am a Roman Catholic. I love my religion but I hate my church as long as the Roman parish is not independent from Rome, as long as Catholic priests are prevented from getting married, as long as Rome is still more engaged in politics and accumulation of money contrary to the teachings of the Lord." He became a naturalized citizen on July 23, 1897.

According to family and friends, Schrank developed a great admiration for American ideals and the Founding Fathers, naming historical figures such as George Washington, James Madison, Tadeusz Kościuszko, and Abraham Lincoln as his personal heroes, and kept tags and documents from his immigration process as mementos. He was described as "mild-mannered, reserved but cheerful, with a wry sense of humor" and well-liked by his neighbors, but also quiet, shy, and withdrawn, and, by his own account, never formed friendships.

In the spring of 1904, his uncle Dominick retired and passed ownership of the tavern to Schrank. Dominick and his wife also sold off the tenement room they had been sharing with him so that they could afford an apartment in Yorkville, so Schrank began lodging with the Zieglers, consisting of mother Melanje "Minnie" Ziegler and three of her children, Alfred, Elisa (also called Ella), and Emily Ziegler, (Note: Ziegler is sometimes given the first name "Elsie", one of many incorrect names from early reports released by the mortuary that processed the victims of the General Slocum disaster.) as they had space for him after Emily's brother Edward moved to Baltimore for work. Schrank and Emily, who was nine years his junior, were close friends, having known each other since childhood; according to some sources, both from the 1920s and contemporary, Schrank had told them that the two were a romantic couple. Emily died at the age of 19 in a fire on the PS General Slocum on June 15, 1904, after which Schrank identified Ziegler's body to pathologist William O'Gorman, though his name was misspelled as "John Schrenck" in news reports, variously calling her his girlfriend or fiancée. Edward Ziegler denied that Schrank was ever engaged and said that his sister was only casually acquainted with Schrank as roommates. Regardless of their relationship, her death greatly affected Schrank, who referred to it as "the greatest tragedy of [his] life" and later said, "I never had a friend in my life, except for one girl who was killed in a steamship accident." After successfully applying for a passport the year before, Schrank briefly returned to Germany in spring 1906 to visit his family in Erding, where he collected an inheritance from his deceased godmother, presumed to have been his maternal grandmother.

Following the General Slocum disaster, the population of Kleindeutschland dwindled over the years, with the Ziegler family being among the first to move away. The tavern's revenue had already plummeted since many of the regulars stopped showing up when Schrank took over as owner, so upon returning from his trip, he sold it to a man named Charles Wolfert and joined his foster parents in Yorkville, paying off their mortgage of US$20,000 (equivalent to $536,299 in 2025) as well as covering numerous other expenses. His aunt died the next year on November 27, 1907, at Presbyterian Hospital, after reportedly suffering a sharp mental decline, followed by her husband on February 11, 1911. Schrank, as the sole grantee in both of their wills, inherited several properties in New York. He sold those properties for US$25,000 (equivalent to $623,694 in 2025) and moved to Brooklyn to be closer to the graves of his foster parents in The Evergreens Cemetery, (Note: Schrank's aunt is buried under the name Annie Finken Flammang, the middle name having been from her first husband, Diedrich Finken.) where he became a frequent visitor. Following his uncle's death, Schrank kept no known social contacts and became forlorn and depressed. He was described as a disconnected and awkward man who did not associate with other people. Around that time Schrank began drinking heavily, his daily intake averaging five pints of beer, and also took up smoking cigars, sometimes as many as six in a day.

Left with a sizable amount of money but no job, Schrank tried to invest in real estate and the insurance branch in January 1912. Within the month, the venture proved unsuccessful and Schrank fell behind on his own mortgage payments, amassing a debt of $13,000 (equivalent to $313,409 in 2025). In February 1912, Schrank found work as a waiter, lunchman, and porter at a tavern in Williamsburg, Brooklyn for four weeks, with frequent complaints about his "peculiarities" and "inability to stand any kind of discipline". His former boss, Theodore Thurmann, recalled Schrank to be "abusive", "too stupid or clumsy", "a weakling", as well as appearing unused to manual labor. In March, Schrank attempted to sue Thurmann over $11 (equivalent to $265 in 2025) in unpaid wages, with the case being dismissed after Schrank called the judge "the oppressor of the poor people" during the proceedings. Schrank's last employment was as a translator for a local German-language newspaper. His last known residence in New York City was at Homestead Hotel.

=== Mental health and obsession with Roosevelt ===
According to Schrank's testimony during his trial, he had a vivid dream in the early morning of September 15, 1901, a day after 25th U.S. president William McKinley died of gunshot wounds sustained in his assassination a week prior. In this dream, Schrank said he saw McKinley's body rise from the casket during his funeral to say "Avenge my death!", pointing at a corner where a "form clad in Monkish garb" stood; Schrank recognized the form in the corner as Theodore Roosevelt. He did not find significance in the dream until Roosevelt announced his bid for the presidential candidacy in February 1912. Schrank, who followed the developments of the 1912 presidential elections with great interest through newspapers, was opposed to Roosevelt and believed seeking a third term violated Schrank's interpretation of the Declaration of Independence and George Washington's Farewell Address, in what he termed "The Unwritten Laws". (Note: These "laws" outlined what Schrank believed were the four core tenets of the U.S. presidency: A president is limited to two terms, is mandated to uphold the Monroe Doctrine, has to be a Protestant and must not engage in wars of conquest.) He claimed that Roosevelt was attempting to dismantle the U.S. Constitution to give himself the power to replace the democratic system with a dictatorship and that Roosevelt, as McKinley's vice president, had orchestrated McKinley's murder to secure the president's office for himself. Schrank also believed that Roosevelt was being backed by "foreign powers" with plans to annex the Panama Canal, which he considered a violation of the Monroe Doctrine that would result in another civil war breaking out. Schrank concluded that his 1901 dream was a vision sent by God and that it was his mission to prevent this from happening, even if it meant killing Roosevelt, seeing the Decalogue commandment "thou shalt not kill" as overridden in such a case, as he would be acting as an instrument of God.

Schrank recalled that a few months later in the early hours of September 14, 1912, following the presidential nomination of Roosevelt in August, he had finished a poem entitled "Be A Man" about the McKinley assassination when he heard a voice say "Let no murderer occupy the presidential chair for a third term. Avenge my death!", followed by a tap on his shoulder. Schrank turned around to see what he described as an apparition of the late President McKinley, staring at him with "dying eyes". He may have also had other hallucinations involving Emily Ziegler. Pre-trial psychiatric examinations attested to chronic paranoia. Following his trial, doctors diagnosed Schrank with "dementia praecox, paranoid type", roughly equivalent to schizophrenia by modern standards.

== Assassination attempt ==
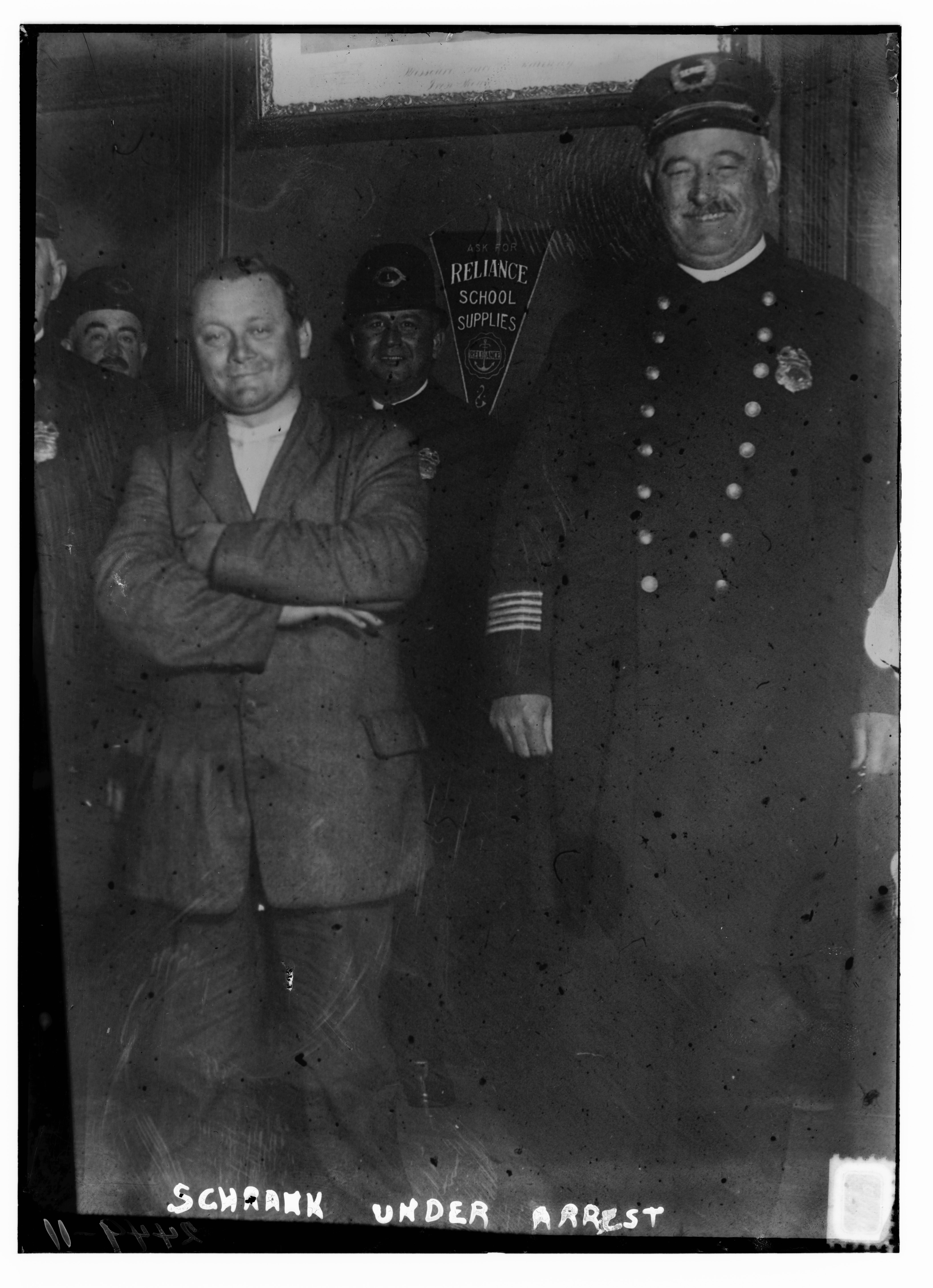
John Schrank after his arrest in Milwaukee (1912)

=== Preparation and travel ===
After his second hallucination, Schrank purchased a $14 (equivalent to $338 in 2025) .38 caliber Colt revolver, possibly a Police Positive or M1892 Army & Navy, and began stalking Roosevelt. He first followed Roosevelt to New Orleans by steamship. He borrowed $350 (equivalent to $8,438 in 2025) from Herman Larunger, the brother of his landlord at the hotel where he was living, to pay the travel expenses for the stalking expedition, making up a story about needing funds to travel to a rich uncle to collect an inheritance. He stated that after not killing Roosevelt in New Orleans he followed him to Charleston, South Carolina; Atlanta, Georgia; Chattanooga, Tennessee; Evansville, Indiana; Indianapolis; and Chicago, and he claimed that for at least part of the trip, he traveled under the name Walter Roos. He followed Roosevelt for 24 days, and found that at each place there were complications that prevented him from getting access to Roosevelt. He said that in Chattanooga he had been within 10 feet (3 m) of Roosevelt but had been too nervous to shoot. When Schrank heard that Roosevelt's next stop was Milwaukee, Wisconsin, he went there to wait. He learned that Roosevelt would be at the Gilpatrick Hotel at 223 Third Street, so he waited across the street from the hotel at Herman Rollfink's saloon. He began drinking beer and told the bartender that he was a journalist.

=== Shooting and arrest ===
Schrank went to the Gilpatrick at 5:45 pm on October 14, 1912, and stood among a crowd that had gathered. Roosevelt arrived and went to his suite to rest; he also ate a meal before his scheduled speech in Milwaukee. At 7:00 pm Schrank went back to the saloon across the street and waited. There was a band at Rollfink's saloon, and Schrank requested that they play "The Star-Spangled Banner"; he danced while they played the song. The bartender, Paul Thume, said that Schrank bought each of the musicians in the band a drink. Witnesses at Rollfink's said that Schrank was quiet and pleasant. Right before he left, he bought another round of drinks.

At approximately 8:00 pm Schrank crossed the street and blended in with the crowd to wait for Roosevelt to emerge. When Roosevelt emerged from the Gilpatrick Hotel at 8:10 pm, he climbed into a waiting convertible. He initially sat down but a crowd that had gathered cheered and Roosevelt stood up and raised his hat to acknowledge them. Schrank then pushed through the crowd and aimed his revolver at Roosevelt's chest. He shot Roosevelt at point-blank range; after the shot, he appeared ready to fire again, with his firearm still raised. Schrank was then tackled by Roosevelt's stenographer Elbert E. Martin who also wrested the gun away. Roosevelt remained calm and Schrank was captured. The crowd began to call for Schrank's lynching but Roosevelt asked them to stop. People did not realize that Roosevelt had been harmed by the shot. Someone asked Roosevelt if he had been hurt and he remarked, "Oh no, missed me that time. I'm not hurt a bit."

Roosevelt did not seek medical attention and he went on to his speaking engagement at the Milwaukee Auditorium after being shot. His opening comments to the gathered crowd were, "I don't know whether you fully understand that I have just been shot, but it takes more than that to kill a Bull Moose." Roosevelt then told the crowd, "The bullet went in here—I will show you." He then opened his vest and showed the bloody stain which had spread from his right breast to his waist. He spoke for 50 minutes before completing his speech and accepting medical attention. After the speech Roosevelt was taken to a hospital emergency room in Milwaukee where he had x-rays taken. Roosevelt decided to take the midnight train to Chicago and while on the train he got the news about the x-ray. The doctors determined that Schrank's bullet had traveled upward 4 inches (10 cm) and had broken Roosevelt's fourth rib on his right side. When Roosevelt arrived in Chicago he checked into Mercy Hospital. He was not more seriously wounded because the bullet first had to pass through his fifty-page speech which had been folded in half, and his spectacle case.

=== Custody ===
When he was arrested, Schrank initially refused to give his name. During questioning he eventually did give his name, and confessed to the crime. Sergeant Robert Flood asked him why he did it, and he said, "I did it because I was opposed to the third term. Don't talk to me, I will not say anything until tomorrow, for I want to sleep." The Milwaukee Sentinel published a special edition the day after the shooting with the headline "Insane Man Shoots Roosevelt". Schrank insisted after his arrest that he was not insane. He said that God had selected him to receive visions and that he was motivated to prevent Roosevelt from becoming a king. Authorities found papers in Schrank's possession which showed that he had been stalking Roosevelt for some time. Due to the ongoing first Red Scare, Schrank was first suspected to have anarchist leanings by both the press and police, notably being accused of associating with Johann Most and Emma Goldman. He denied having any political leanings or affiliation to either the Democratic or Republican parties during interrogation. After he had been in jail for a week, the sheriff ordered Schrank to bathe regularly; there were complaints about his offensive body odor and reports that he did not like to bathe. Because of the smell, the sheriff also ordered Schrank's clothes destroyed.

=== Legal proceedings ===
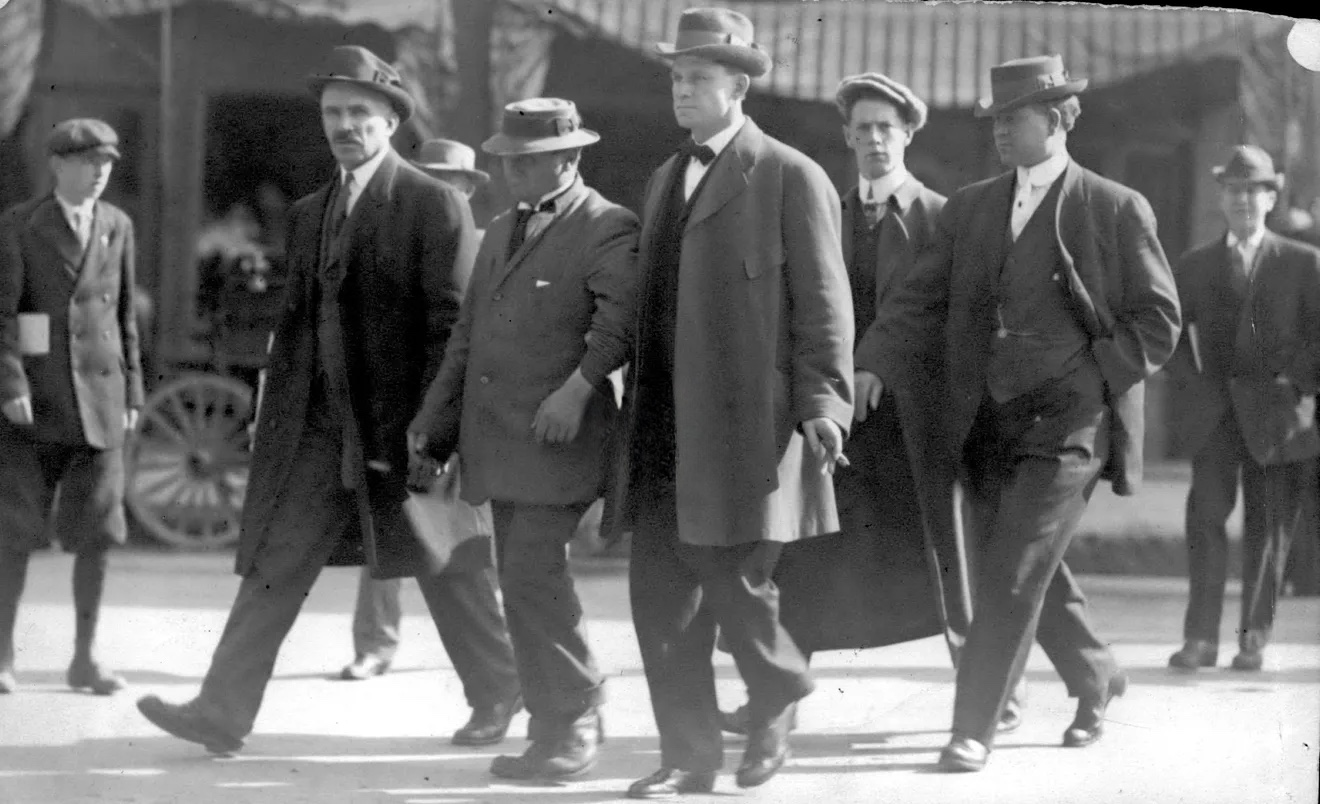
John Schrank being escorted to court (1912)

On October 15, 1912, at 10:35 am, Schrank made his first arraignment appearance before Judge N. B. Neelen. He admitted that he had shot Roosevelt, and was held with bail set at $7,500 (equivalent to $250,216 in 2025). His bail was later raised to $15,000 (equivalent to $500,431 in 2025) based on rumors that there were people who might bail him out of jail to make a movie about him.

Schrank's next court appearance was on November 12, 1912, at 10:00 am; he appeared in court before Judge August C. Backus for a preliminary hearing. Schrank pleaded guilty. He was charged with shooting with the intent to kill, which carried a maximum sentence of 15 years. In court, Schrank stated, "I plead guilty to shooting the man. I did not intend to kill citizen Roosevelt. I intended to kill Theodore Roosevelt the third-termer". Instead of accepting the plea, the judge decided to appoint a panel which was referred to as a "Sanity Commission" to determine whether Schrank was mentally fit. The panel consisted of Dr. F. C. Studley, Dr. W. F. Becker, Dr. Richard Dewey, Dr. W. F. Wegge, and Dr. D. W. Harrington. Schrank was sent back to the jail and the court made plans to have a second preliminary hearing at 2:00 pm. The court assigned James G. Flanders to be Schrank's attorney. At 2:00 pm that day the panel of physicians were told that they were to determine whether Schrank was "insane at the present time" or not.

On November 14, 1912, the Sanity Commission began its evaluation of Schrank. They said he was right-handed, 5 feet 4 1/2 inches (164 cm) tall without shoes and he weighed 160 pounds (73 kg) wearing his clothing. He had blonde hair and his eyes were described as bluish-gray. They noted that his jailer described him as a quiet, fastidious and cheerful man. Here is the end of their report dated November 22, 1912:

Our conclusions are as follows:

- First—John Schrank is suffering from insane delusions, grandiose in character, and of the systematized variety.
- Second—In our opinion he is insane at the present time.
- Third—On account of the connection existing between his delusions and the act with which he stands charged, we are of the opinion that he is unable to confer intelligently with counsel or to conduct his defense.

When Schrank appeared before Judge Backus on November 22, 1912, the judge made the following statement:

The court now finds that the defendant John Schrank is insane, and therefore incapacitated to act for himself. It is Therefore Ordered and Adjudged, that the defendant John Schrank be committed to the Northern Hospital for the Insane, near Oshkosh, in the county of Winnebago, state of Wisconsin, until such time when he shall have recovered from such insanity, when he shall be returned to this court for further proceedings according to law. And it is Further Ordered, that all proceedings in this case be stayed indefinitely and until such recovery.

On November 25, 1912, Schrank was committed to the Northern Hospital for the Insane in Waupun, Wisconsin. In a December 16, 1912, letter from Theodore Roosevelt to journalist John St. Loe Strachey, Roosevelt wrote that Schrank was not a madman, but had a "disordered brain which most criminals, and a great many non criminals, have".

While incarcerated, Schrank was pleased that Theodore Roosevelt did not win a third term. When US President Franklin D. Roosevelt won a third term in the 1940 United States presidential election Schrank told a guard that if he were not incarcerated, he would interfere.

== Death ==
Schrank died September 15, 1943, in the Central State Hospital for the Criminally Insane. His body was given to Milwaukee's Marquette University School of Medicine. Time magazine reported that Schrank received no visitors and no mail during his 31 years of incarceration. In 1943 The Knoxville Journal reported that the superintendent of the Central State Hospital for the Criminally Insane, Dr. R. A. Remley, stated that Schrank was a model prisoner and he was occasionally allowed to go to the city of Waupun alone. It was reported that Schrank's cause of death was bronchial pneumonia.

== Gallery ==
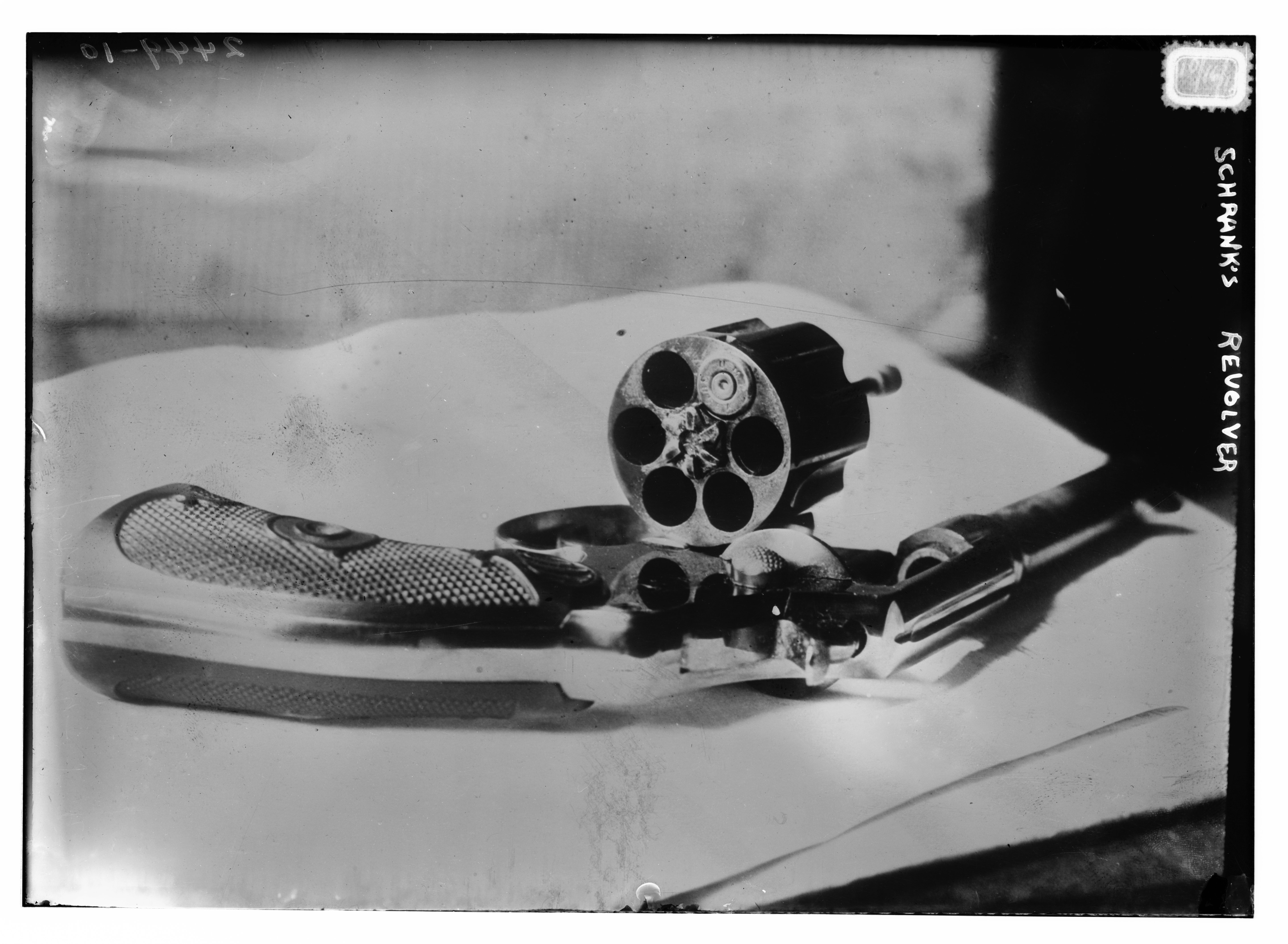
The .38 caliber Colt revolver, possibly a Police Positive or M1892 Army & Navy, to shoot Roosevelt

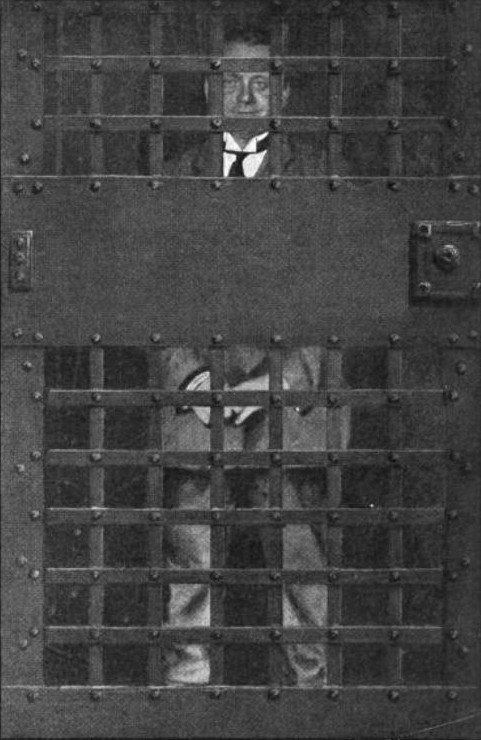
Schrank in jail October 31, 1912

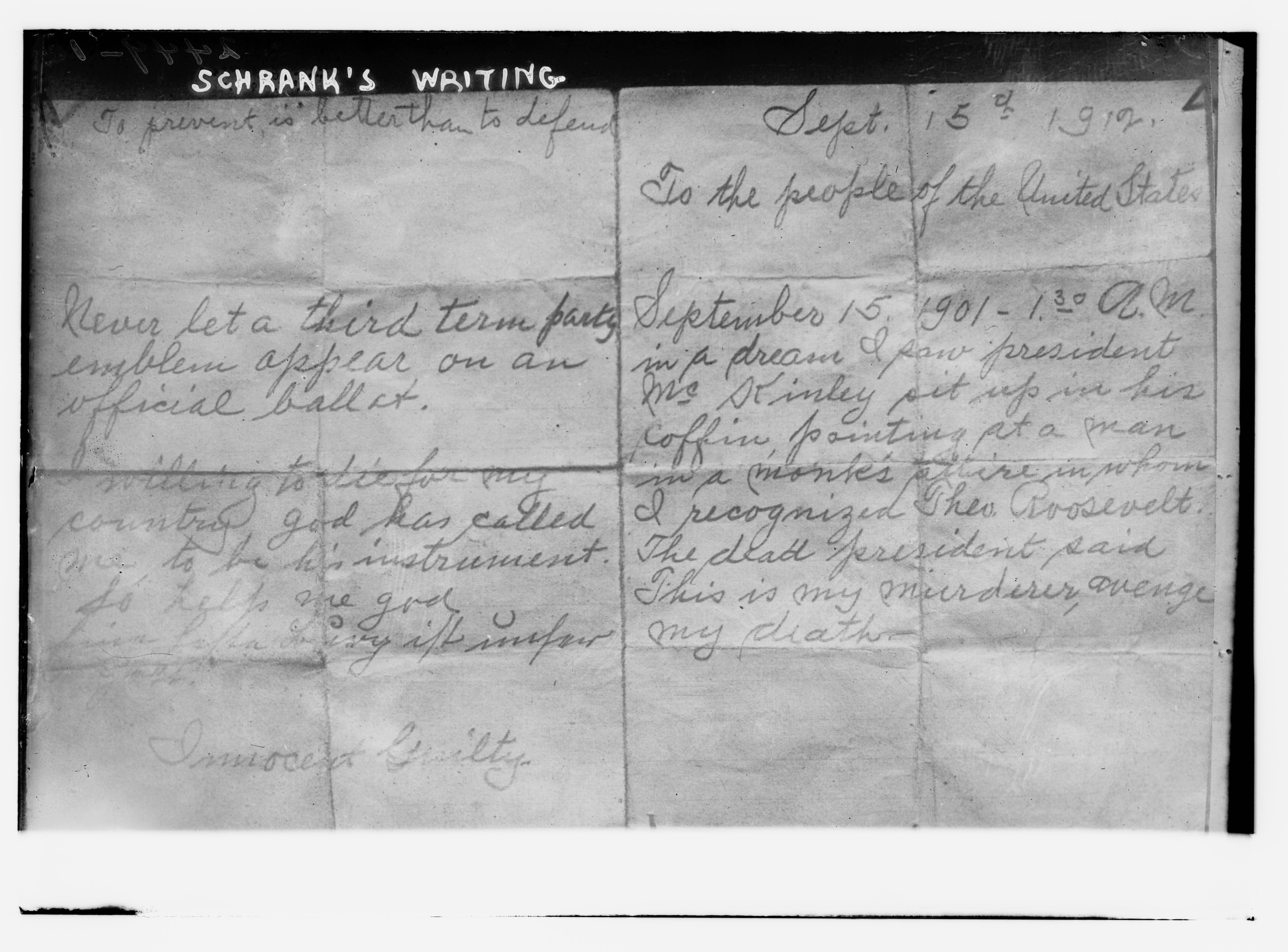
Sample of Schrank's writing about presidential third terms and about his hallucination

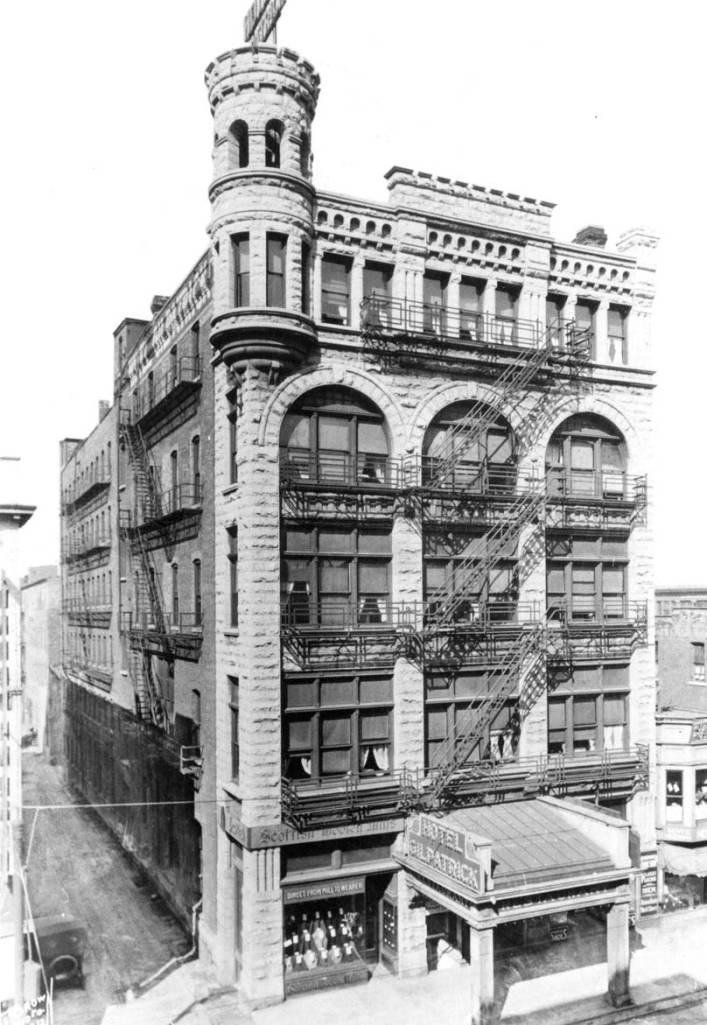
Hotel Gilpatrick, site of the assassination attempt
