= Hyatt Regency Milwaukee =

Hotel in Milwaukee Wisconsin

Hyatt Regency
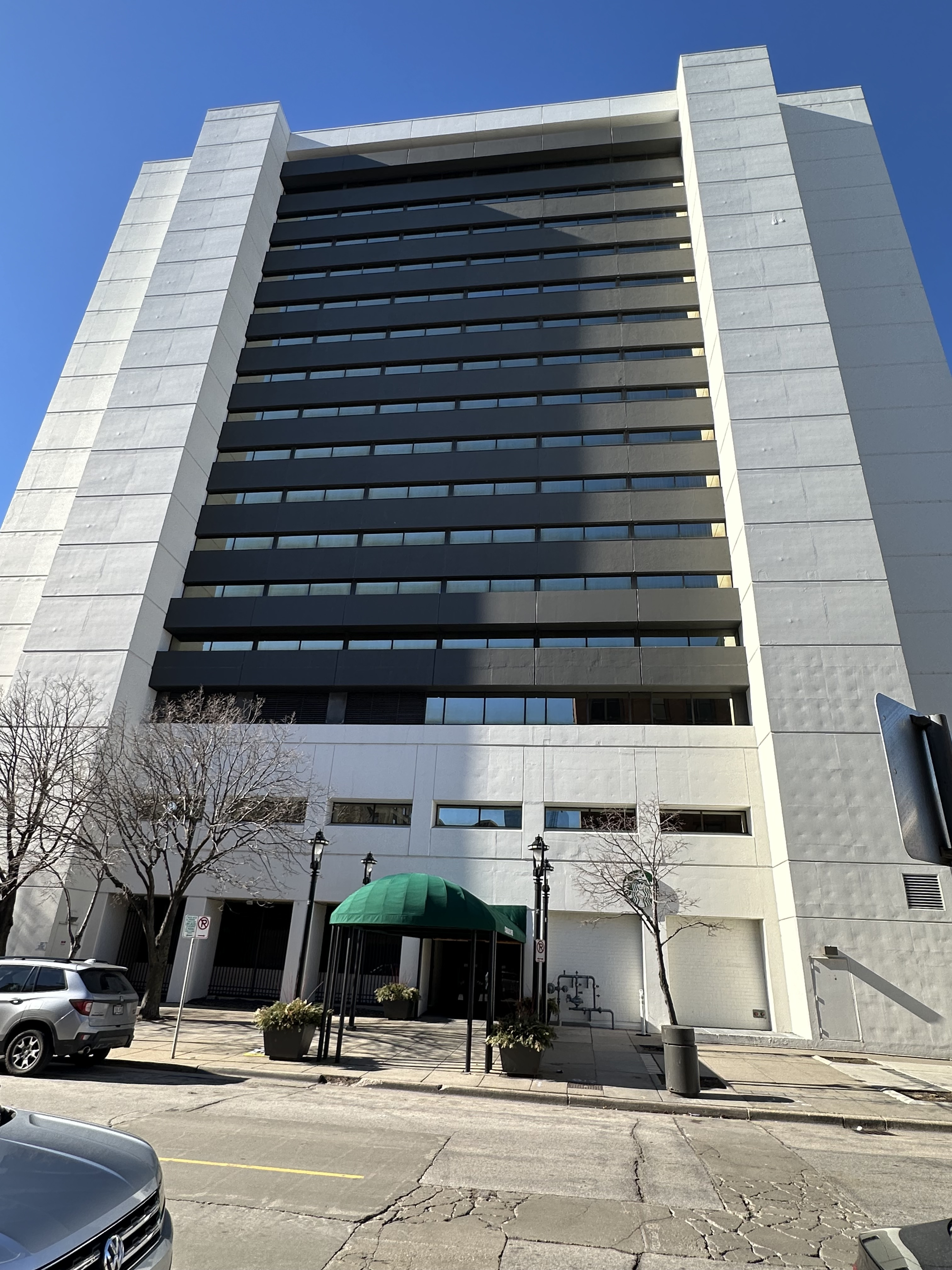
- Image from Martin Luther King Junior Drive

General information
- Location: 333 West Kilbourn Avenue, Milwaukee, Wisconsin, U.S.
- Coordinates: 43.040833°N 87.914444°W
- Renovated: 2019
- Cost: US$37.3 million
- Owner: Cambridge Landmark

Technical details
- Material: Poured concrete
- Floor count: 21

Design and construction
- Architect: Py-Vavra Architects-Engineers

Website
- Hyatt

The Hyatt Regency Milwaukee is located at 333 West Kilbourn Avenue in Downtown Milwaukee, Wisconsin, in the United States. The 21-story hotel was built in 1979 and is owned by Cambridge Landmark, a Miami-based private equity firm.

== Background ==
The hotel was built in 1979 and is 353,054 sq ft (32,799.8 m^{2}) with 33,000 sq ft (3,100 m^{2}) of meeting space. The Hyatt Regency is a 21-story 484-room hotel located in Downtown Milwaukee, Wisconsin. It was built by the Hunzinger Construction Company and designed by Py-Vavra Architects-Engineers. One of the hotel's most unique features is the revolving rooftop restaurant. It is made using poured concrete. The restaurant was called the Polaris and opened in 1980. On April 12, 2009, it closed and the space was used for meetings. In 2014, Ponyville Ciderfest began being held at the hotel, where it still continues. In 2015 the area was reopened after a renovation and the owners announced that the space would no longer rotate.

== History ==
In 2007 the owners of the hotel were the Noble Investment Group, an Atlanta-based company. Noble purchased the property from Gary Grunau and his partners for US$43.9 million. In 2009, Noble spent approximately $19 million to renovate. In 2018 a Miami-based private equity firm (Cambridge Landmark) paid $37.3 million to purchase the hotel. In 2019 the new owners began renovating the hotel.

The first three days of the 2004 Green National Convention were held at the Milwaukee Hyatt Regency, while the final day was held at the Baird Center convention venue. In 2023 the Milwaukee Skywalk was added to connect the Hyatt to the Baird Center.

=== Assassination attempt ===
The hotel was built on the site of the former Gilpatrick Hotel. On October 14, 1912, the Gilpatrick was the site of an assassination attempt on the former President of the United States Theodore Roosevelt. A plaque commemorating the assassination attempt was added to the front of the Gilpatrick Hotel by the United Spanish War Veterans of Milwaukee County in 1926. After the Gilpatrick was razed the plaque was saved and stored. In 1979 the plaque was affixed to the newly constructed Hyatt Regency. It can now be found near the Starbucks.

On October 14, 2012, to mark the 100th anniversary of the assassination attempt, the city reenacted the event. It took place at the east entrance of the Hyatt Regency where the Gilpatrick once stood. The participants wore period costumes including several police re-enactors.

=== Death of Dvontaye Mitchell ===
On June 30, 2024, Dvontaye L. Mitchell, a 43-year-old African-American man, died after being pinned to the ground by four security staff members at the hotel. The four staff were fired and have been charged for felony murder.

== Gallery ==
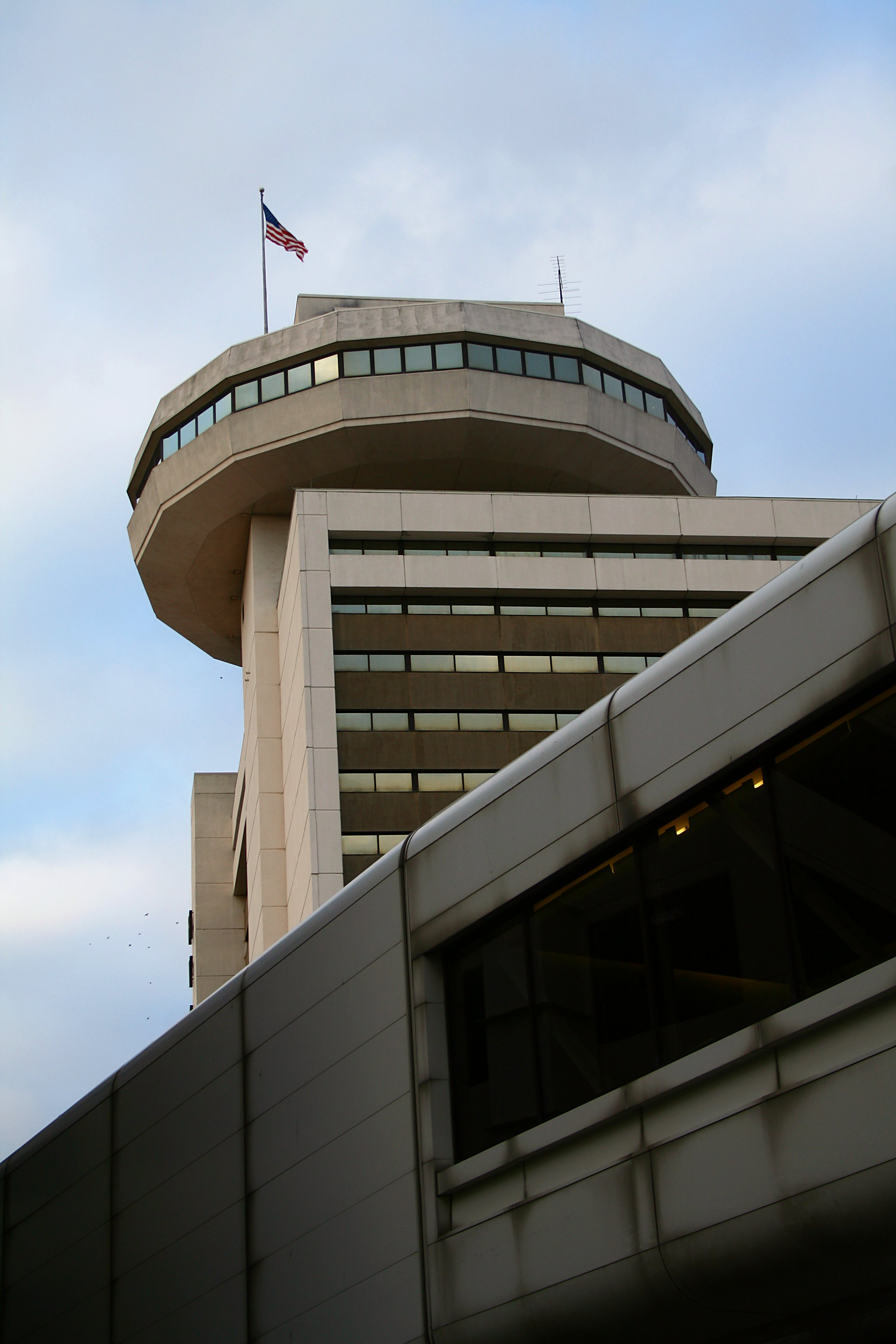
The rotating restaurant; a skyway in front

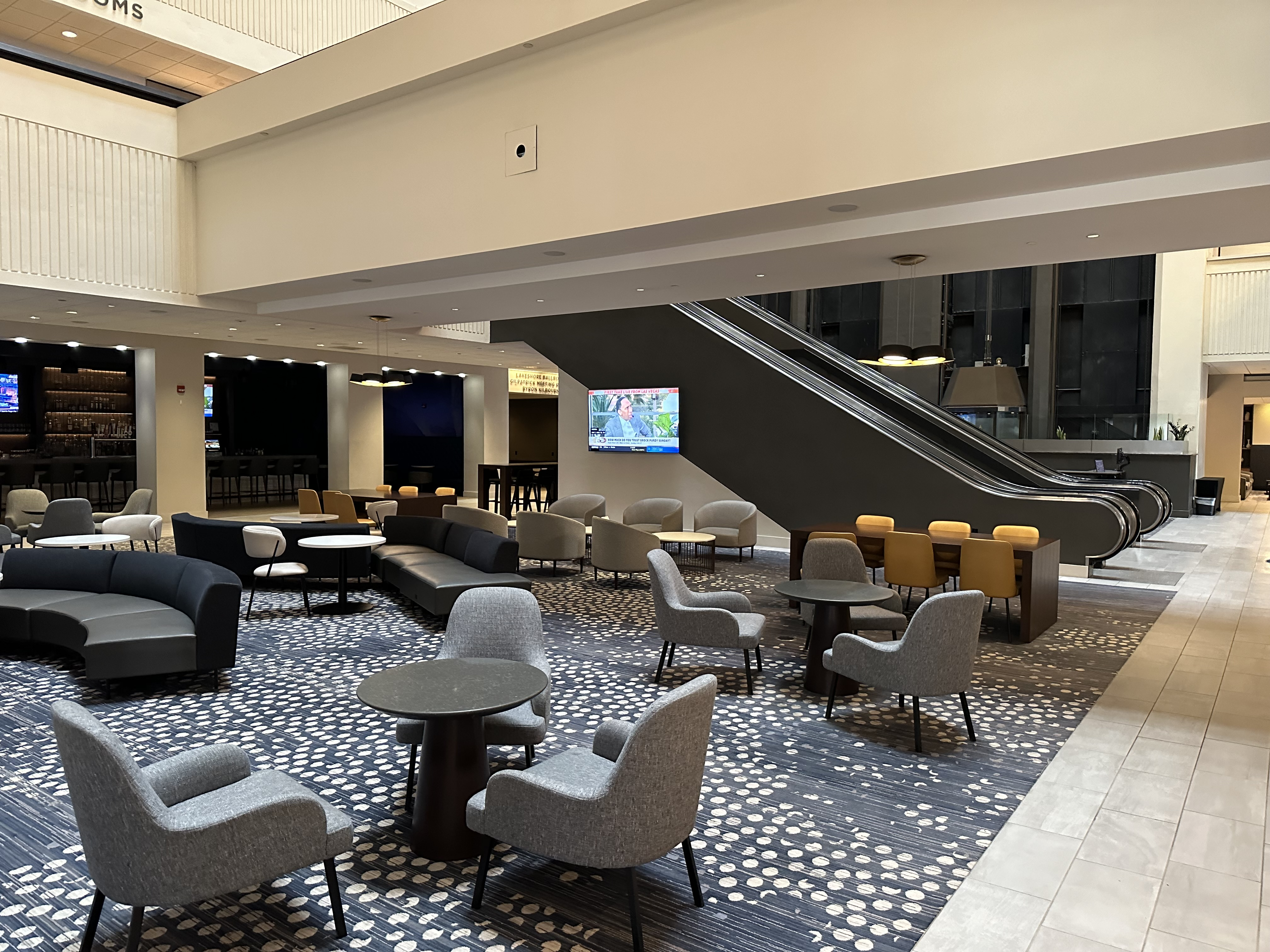
The lobby seating area

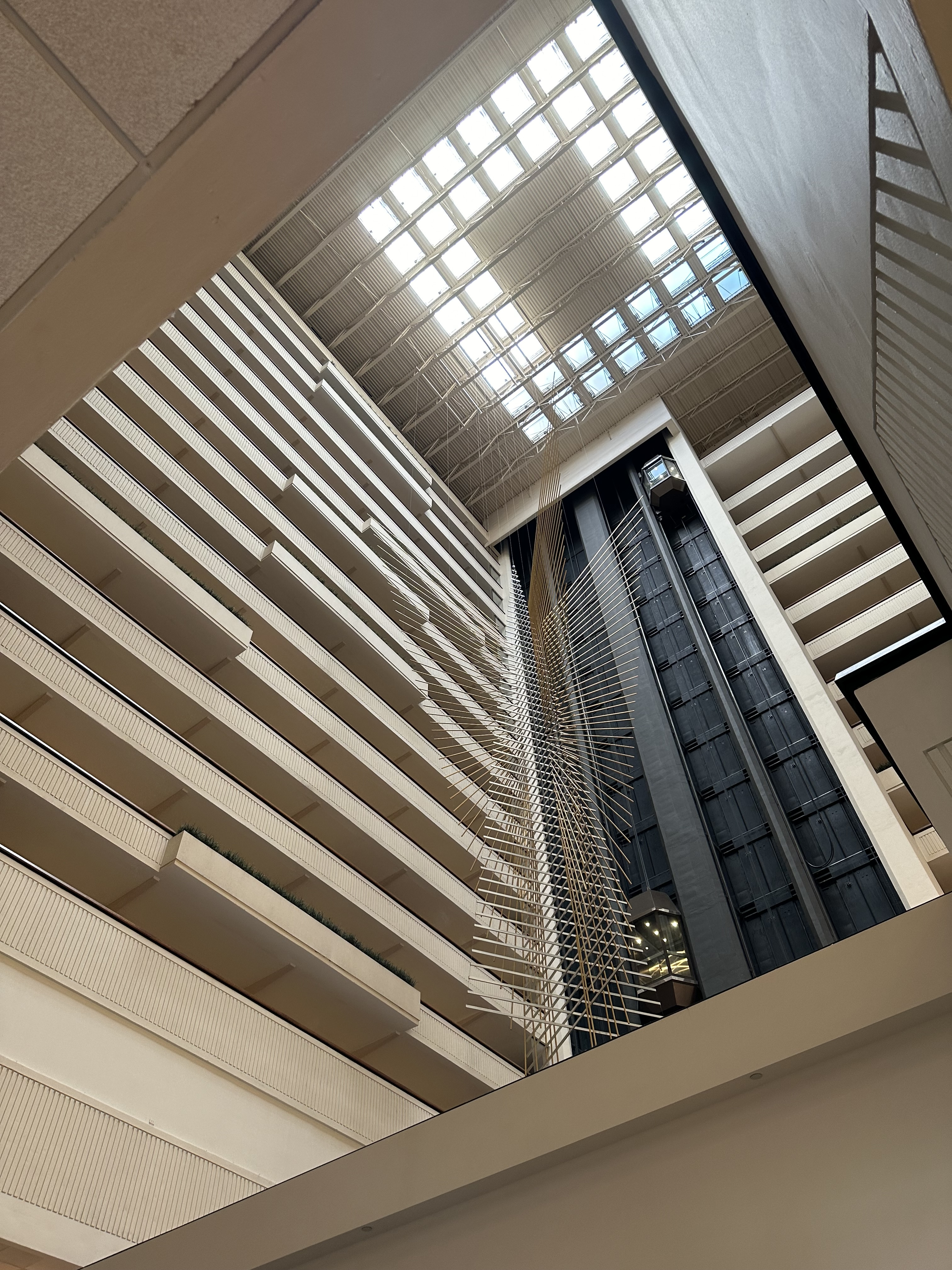
Looking up through the center of the lobby

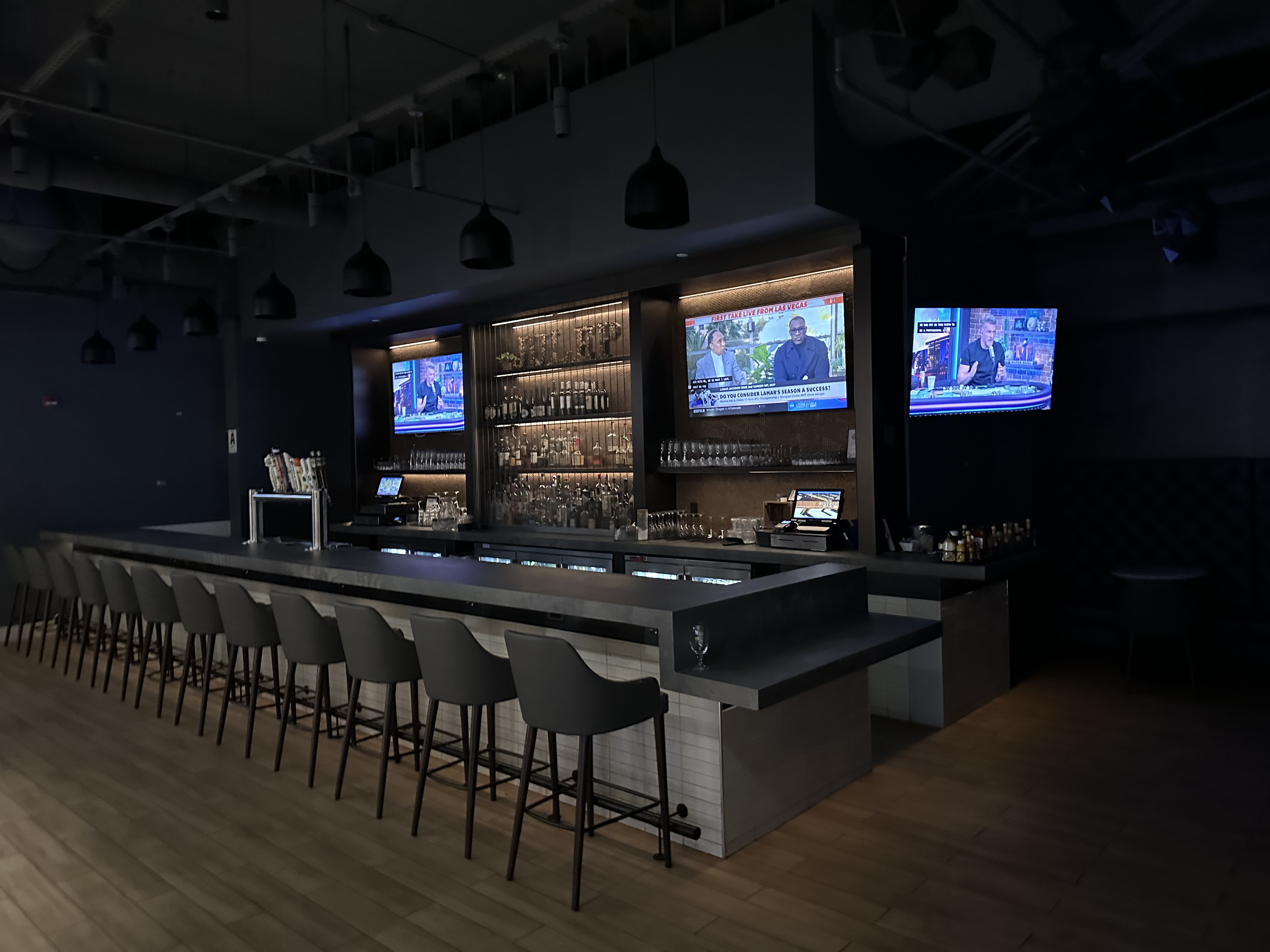
The hotel's bar
