= Gilpatrick Hotel =

Hotel in Milwaukee, Wisconsin

Hotel Gilpatrick
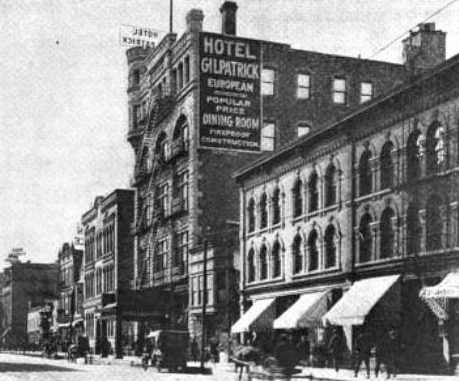
- Hotel Gilpatrick in October 1912
- Interactive map of the Hotel Gilpatrick area

General information
- Architectural style: Romanesque Revival
- Location: 223 Third Street, Milwaukee, Wisconsin, U.S.
- Coordinates: 43°2′27.3″N 87°54′53″W
- Completed: c. 1900; 126 years ago
- Opened: 1907; 119 years ago
- Renovated: 1907; 119 years ago
- Closed: April 1, 1932; 94 years ago
- Demolished: December 1941; 84 years ago

Technical details
- Material: Brick
- Floor count: 5

Gilpatrick Hotel was situated at 223 Third Street in Milwaukee, Wisconsin, in the United States. It was opened in 1907 and was operated by members of the Gilpatrick family. The hotel was the site of the attempted assassination of Theodore Roosevelt in 1912.

In 1941 the hotel was razed and in 1979 the Hyatt Regency Milwaukee was erected in its place. In 1926 a memorial plaque commemorating the assassination attempt was affixed to the front of the Gilpatrick; it was removed, stored, and subsequently attached to the new hotel.

== History ==
The building was constructed in the style of Romanesque Revival architecture. It was originally occupied by the Romadka Bros Company, manufacturers of luggage trunks. They used the building to house their offices and they were a well-known company in Milwaukee.

Martin G. Gilpatrick started the Milwaukee hotel in 1907. The building had to be remodeled in order to create hotel rooms. It was located at 223 Third Street and in February 1907 during hotel construction, fifty workers walked off the job. The skilled trades, including carpenters, bricklayers, and masons, began the strike action to protest non-union electricians and ironworkers who arrived to begin work on the construction site. The workers reached an agreement and returned to work after one week. After the remodel and opening as a hotel, it was managed by George H. Byer. It was considered to be a luxury hotel. In 1912 Herman Rollfink's saloon was directly across the street from the hotel on Third Street.

Martin Gilpatrick died in 1918, and ownership passed to Samuel and Rosaline Gilpatrick. The hotel changed hands when Samuel died on January 3, 1924. The hotel was leased by Irving Gilpatrick, and the lease had a 1932 expiration. In 1921 a Hungarian restaurant named "Gross" was operating at the Gilpatrick Hotel.

The last day of operation as a hotel was April 1, 1932. Demolition of the building was approved in late December 1941, after ten years of not being used as a hotel. The hotel was located at Third and Kilbourn which is now the site of the Hyatt Regency Milwaukee. The upper floors were razed but there was a tavern on the first floor which remained open.

=== Assassination attempt ===
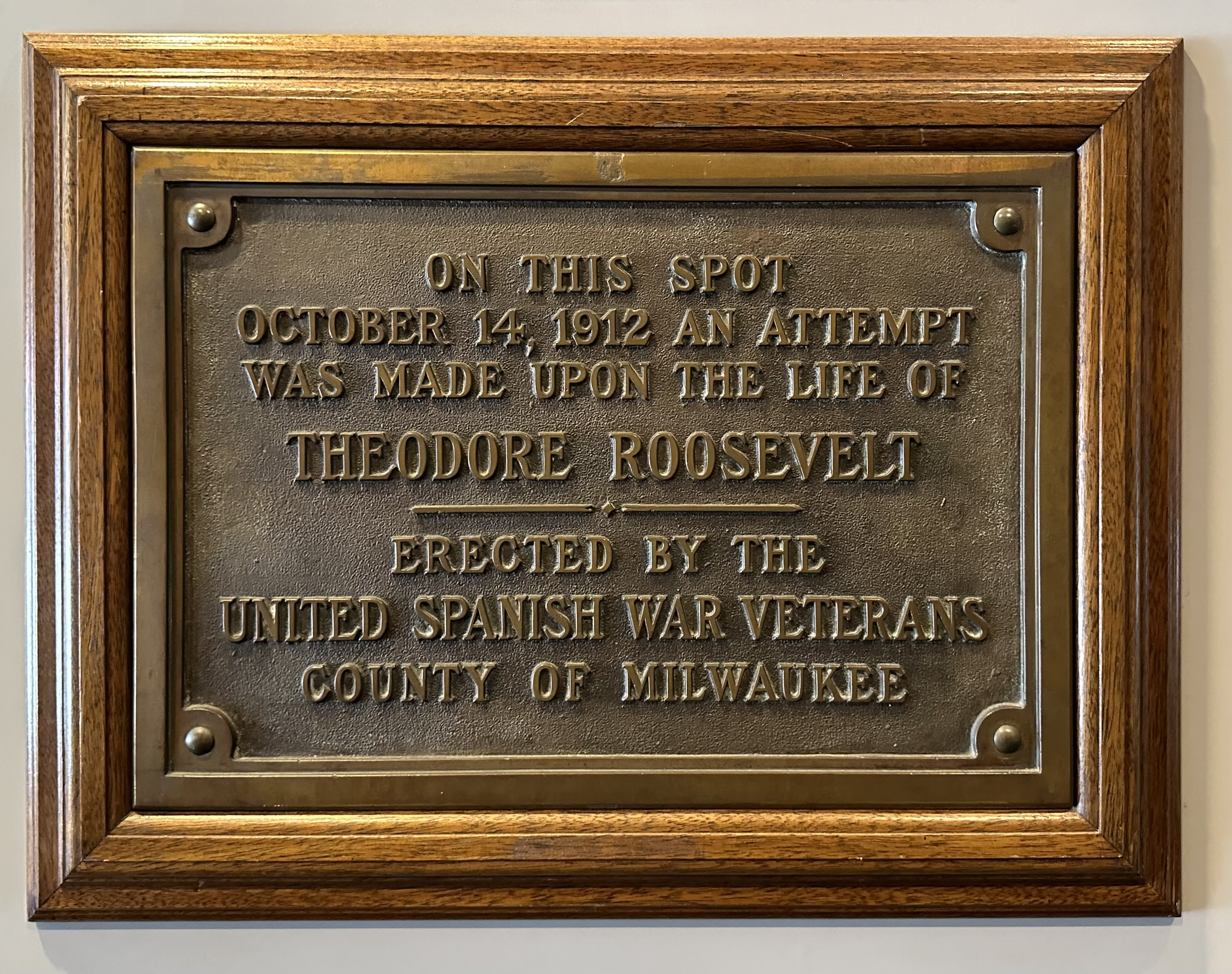
The 1926 plaque commemorating the attempted assassination of Theodore Roosevelt

On October 14, 1912, former President of the United States Theodore Roosevelt went to Milwaukee to campaign for re-election as president. He and his entourage ate dinner at the Gilpatrick because the owner, Gilpatrick, was a supporter. After dinner Roosevelt got into an open convertible directly in front of the hotel. As he stood up to acknowledge the crowd that had gathered, a man named John Schrank shot him in the chest. Roosevelt survived the assassination attempt and Schrank was arrested.

A plaque was fitted to the front of the Gilpatrick Hotel to commemorate the event. It was added by the United Spanish War Veterans of Milwaukee County in 1926. After the building was razed the plaque was saved and stored. In 1979 the plaque was affixed to the newly constructed Hyatt Regency. On October 14, 2012, to mark the 100th anniversary of the assassination attempt, the city reenacted the event. It took place at the east entrance of the Hyatt Regency where the Gilpatrick once stood. The participants wore period costumes including several police re-enactors.

== Gallery ==
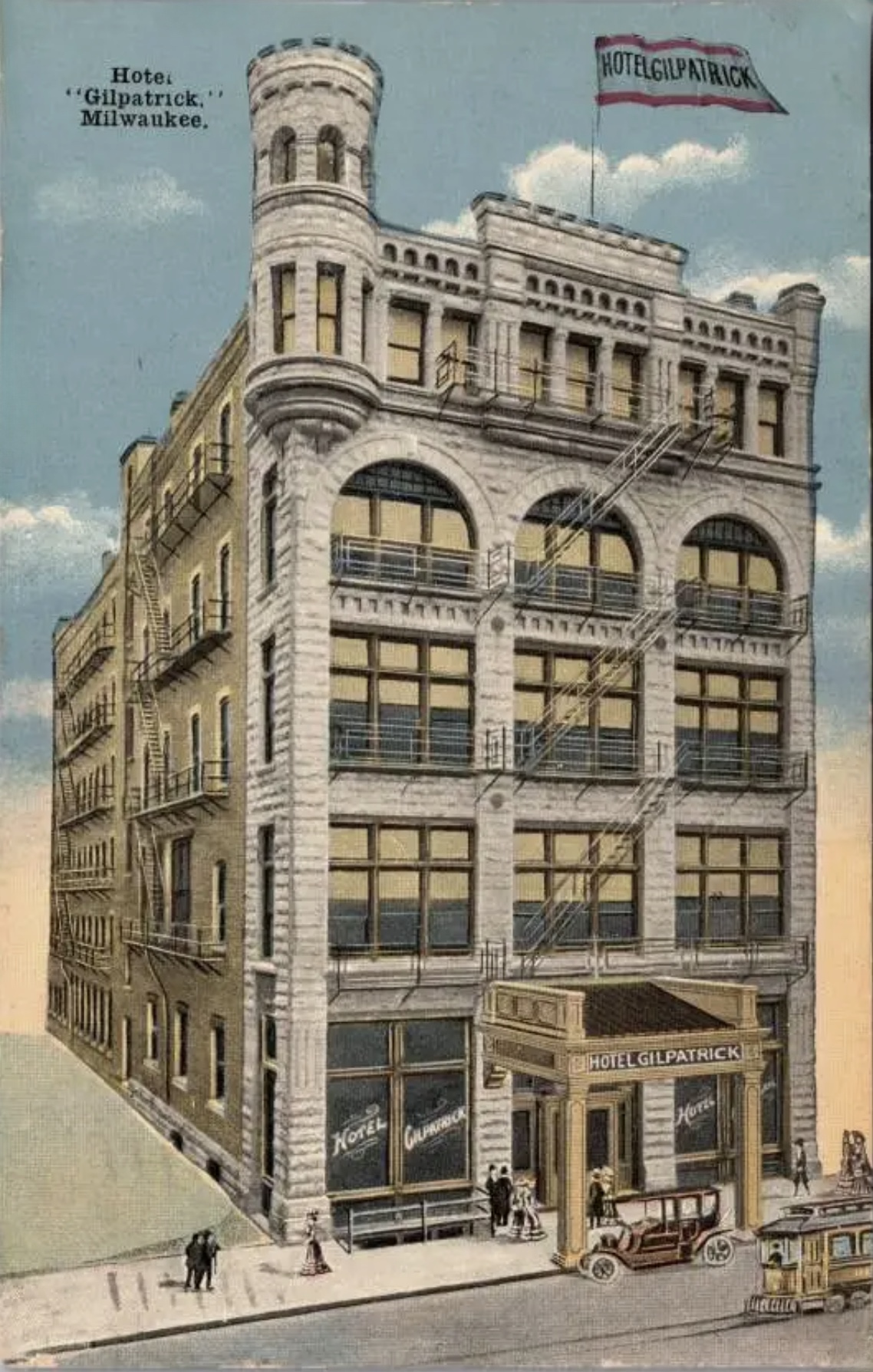
Hotel Gilpatrick post card (1917)

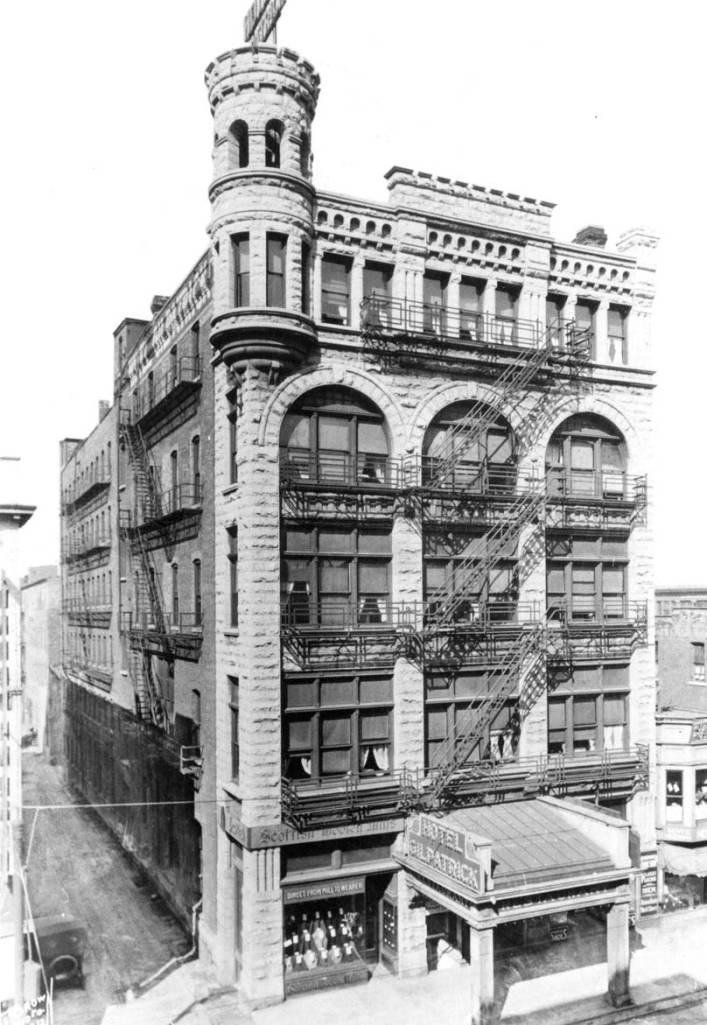
1926 image of the hotel

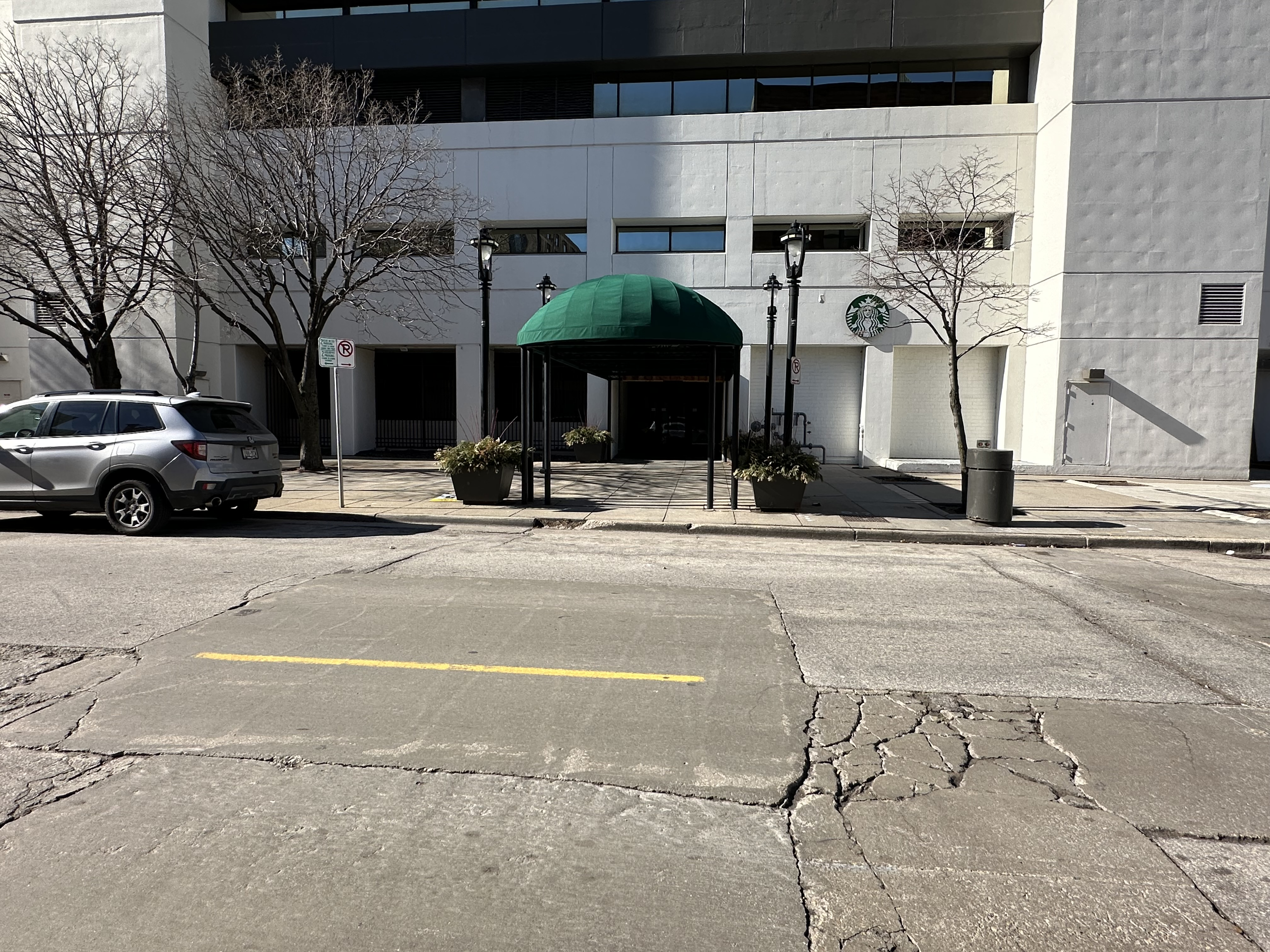
2024 view of the spot where Roosevelt was shot

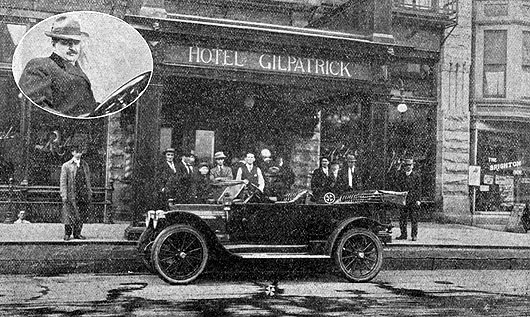
The automobile in which ex-president Roosevelt stood in front of the Gilpatrick Hotel. Crosses mark where Roosevelt and Schrank each stood.
