= Glass bridge =

Glass Bridge or glass bridge may refer to:

== Bridges ==
- Glimmer Glass Bridge, a road bridge in America

== Skywalks ==
- The Grand Canyon Skywalk, a glass-bottomed cantilever bridge, opened to the public on March 28, 2007, after construction began in 2004.
- East Taihang Glasswalk, Hebei Province, China
- Zhangjiajie Glass Bridge, Hunan, China
- Vagamon Glass Bridge, a skywalk bridge in Kerala, India
- Kyiv Glass Bridge, a pedestrian bridge in Khreshchatyi Park, Kyiv, Ukraine

== Music ==
- "The Glass Bridge", a song by Animals as Leaders from the album The Madness of Many, 2016

== See also ==
- Skywalk
