= Milwaukee Skywalk =

Elevated pedestrian route

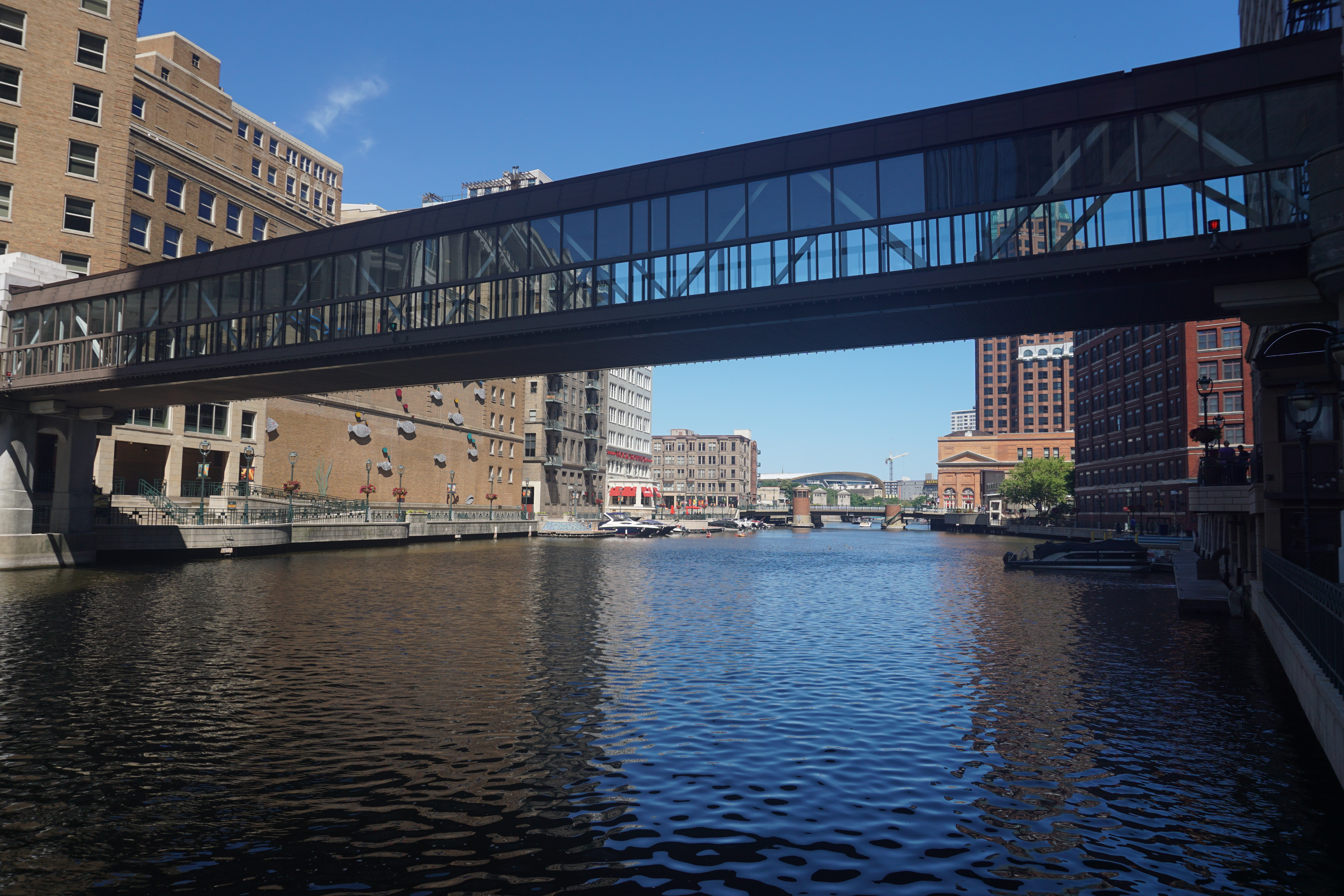
A skywalk spanning the Milwaukee River

The Milwaukee Skywalk is a 1.75 mi (2.82 km) network of skyways which connects several buildings in downtown Milwaukee, Wisconsin.

== Description ==
The skywalk system consists of 1.75 mi (2.82 km) of walkways that connect about eight city blocks in downtown Milwaukee. Some notable buildings that the skywalk connects include: The Avenue, 310W, Hyatt Regency, Baird Center, Chase Tower, Riverside Theater, and 100 East Wisconsin. The system crosses the Milwaukee River in two places.

The skywalk system is decorated with several murals.

== History ==
Many of the skywalks in Milwaukee were constructed during the 1980s. The mayor at the time, John Norquist, believed that the skywalks would be bad for retail businesses since they would remove pedestrians from street-level. At some time in the 1990s, a committee was created to review the designs of any new skywalks. In 2023, a 110 ft (34 m) section of skywalk was added between the Hyatt Regency and the Baird Center. Historic Milwaukee has offered tours of the skywalk system which they refer to as a "Skywaukee tour".

== See also ==
- Milwaukee Riverwalk
- Minneapolis Skyway System
