= East Taihang Glasswalk =

Skywalk bridge

- Coordinates: 29.05321°N 110.48027°E

Characteristics
- Total length: 226 metres (741 ft)
- Width: 2 metres (6 ft 7 in)
- Height: 1,180 metres (3,870 ft)

History
- Opening: October 2017
- Closed: October 30, 2019

Location
- Interactive map of East Taihang Glasswalk

The East Taihang Glasswalk was a skywalk bridge located in East Taihang Mountains, Hebei Province, China. Opened in October 2017 it is built 1,180 metres (3,870 ft) above sea level, stretches 226 metres (741 ft) long, and is roughly 2 metres (6 ft 7 in) wide.

The bridge was the subject of some controversy for a special effect that made it appear as if the glass was cracking beneath the feet of those trying to cross it. Infrared sensors would determine when a pedestrian was walking across the bridge, at which point light decorations and sound effects would produce the illusion of glass cracking. The administration of East Taihang officially apologized for the illusion shortly after the bridge's opening, saying that the effect was designed to be "provocative".

The East Taihang Glasswalk was part of a larger design scheme in China to create "invisible" glass-bottomed footbridges. Other notable skywalks of this variety include the Zhangjiajie Glass Bridge and the Yuntain Mountain Walkway. After a series of deaths and injuries on glass bridges in Hebei, the province closed all 32 of its glass-bottomed skywalks, including the East Taihang Glasswalk, on October 30, 2019, while it examined their safety protocols.

== See also ==
- Zhangjiajie Glass Bridge
