= Skyway =

Elevated type of pedestrian walkway

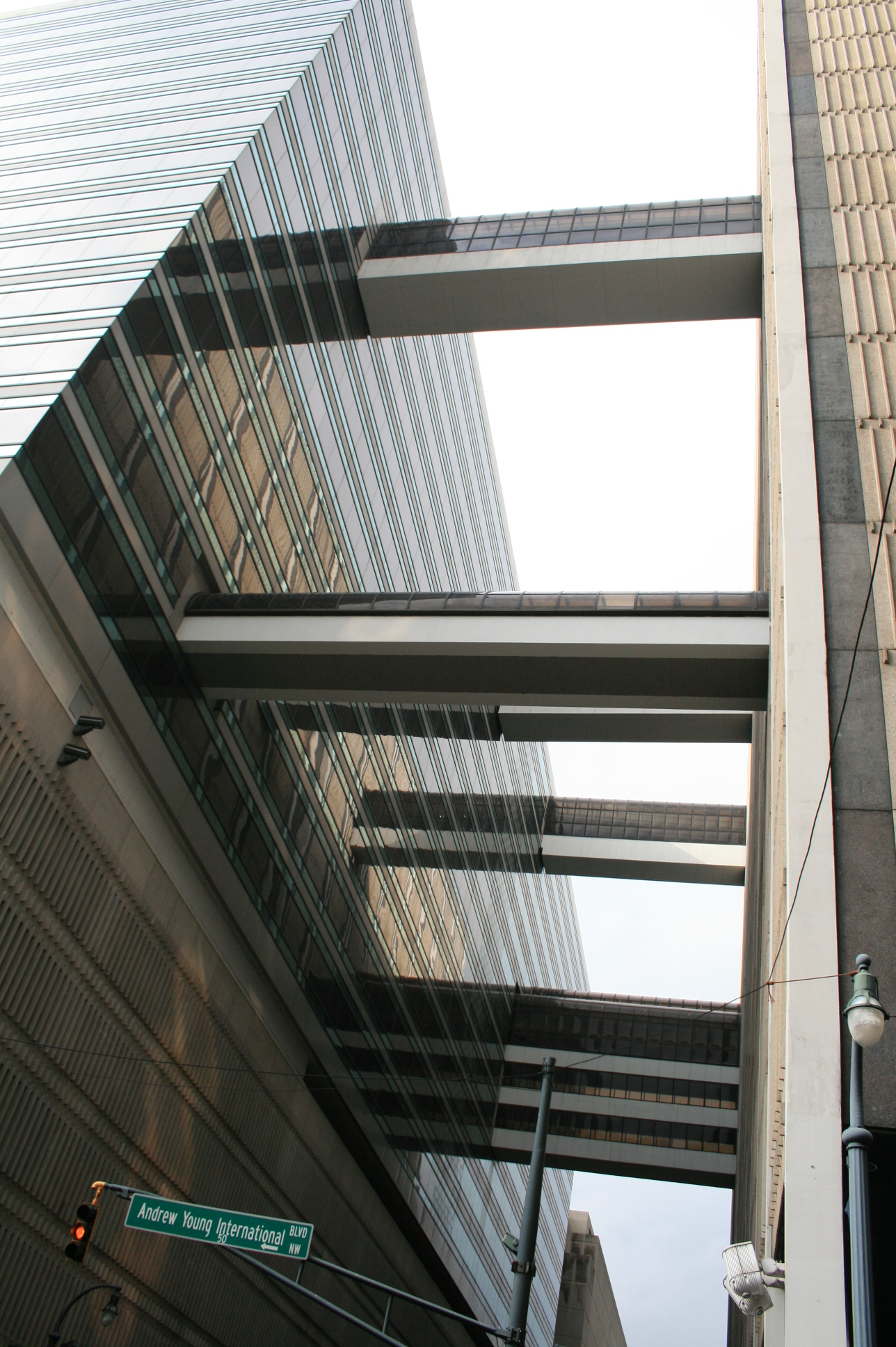
Skyways in the Peachtree Center district of Atlanta

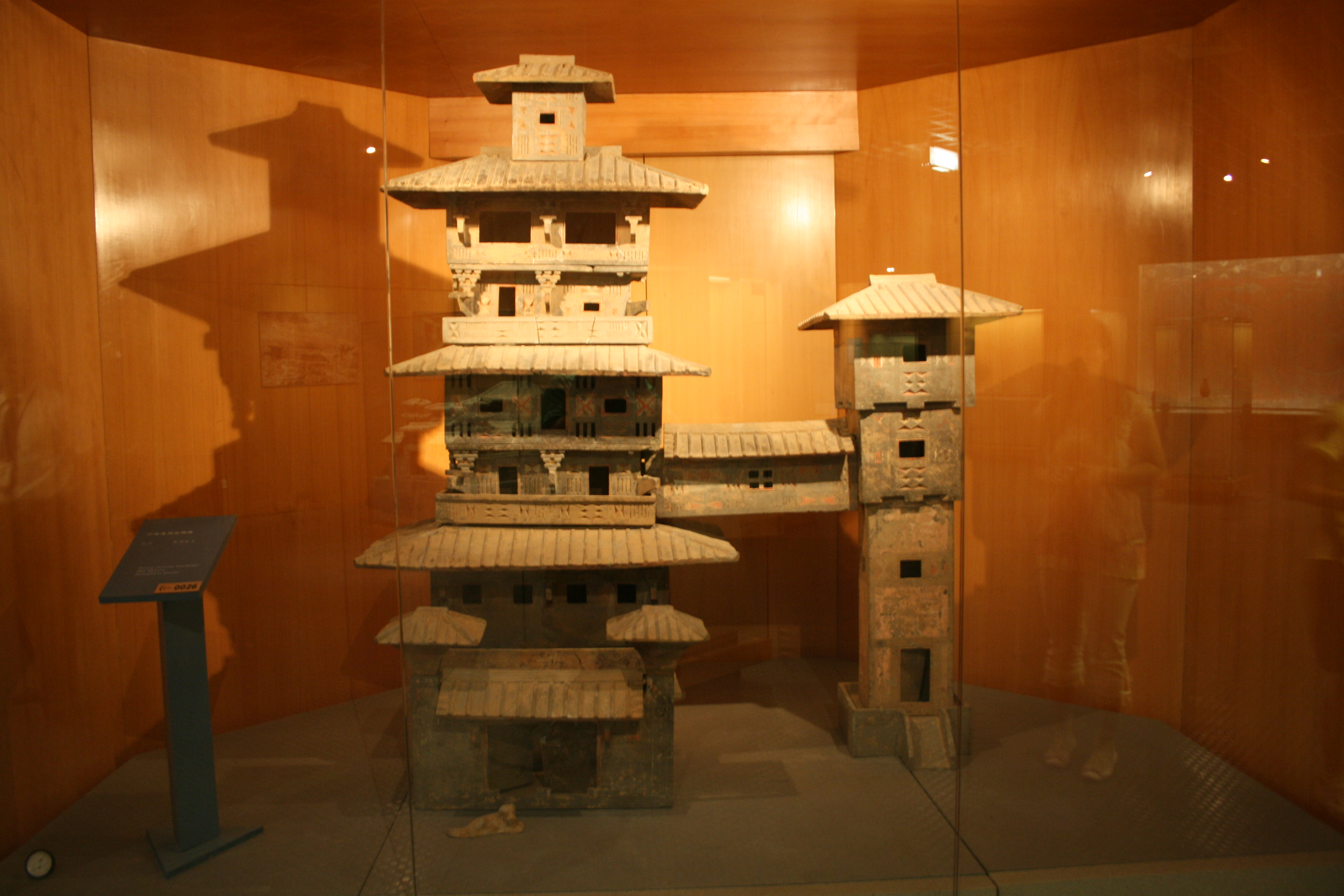
A Han dynasty (202 BC – 220 AD) Chinese miniature model of two residential towers joined by a skyway

A skyway, skybridge, skywalk or sky walkway is an elevated pedestrian walkway connecting two or more buildings in an urban area, or connecting elevated points within mountainous recreational zones. Urban skyways very often take the form of enclosed or covered footbridges that protect pedestrians from the weather. Open-top modern skyways in mountains now often have glass bottoms. Sometimes enclosed urban skywalks are made almost totally from glass, including ceilings, walls and floors. Some urban skyways function strictly as linear parks designed for walking.

In North America skyways are usually owned by businesses, and are therefore not public spaces as compared with sidewalks. However, in Asia, such as Bangkok's and Hong Kong's skywalks, they are built and owned separately by the city government, connecting privately run rail stations or other transport with their own footbridges, and run many kilometers. Skyways usually connect on the first few floors above the ground-level floor, though they are sometimes much higher, as in the Petronas Towers. The space in the buildings connected by skyways is often devoted to retail business, so areas around the skyway may operate as a shopping mall. Non-commercial areas with closely associated buildings, such as university campuses, can often have skyways and/or tunnels connecting buildings.

The world's largest discontinuous skyway network – Calgary, Alberta, Canada's "+15 Walkway" system – has a total length of 16 km (9.9 mi). The world's largest continuous network is the KAFD Skyway Network in Riyadh, Saudi Arabia, at 9.6 miles (15.4 km), just surpassing the Minneapolis Skyway System, which spans 9.5 miles (15.3 km) connecting 80 blocks in downtown Minneapolis, Minnesota, United States.

On a smaller scale, terminals of large airports are often connected by skywalk systems, as at Manchester Airport, United Kingdom; in many airports, retractable jet bridges provide a direct connection between airplanes and terminals.

Some cities have the equivalent of a skyway underground, and there are also mixed subway–skyway systems; see underground city.

== Early examples ==
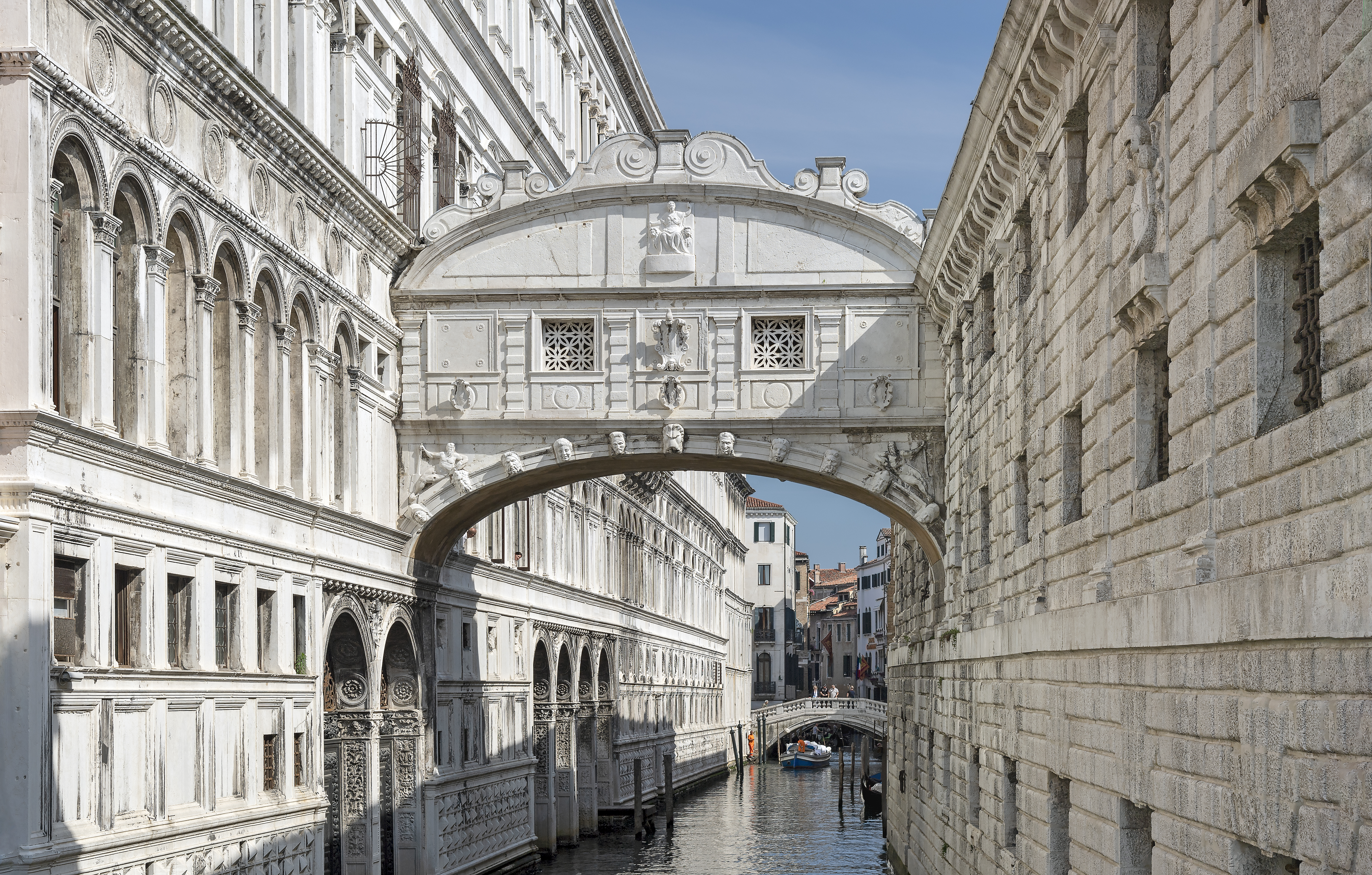
The Bridge of Sighs in Venice, Italy

- Florence, Italy, Vasari Corridor, connects Palazzo Vecchio to Uffizi and then to Palazzo Pitti, 16th century
- Venice, Italy, Bridge of Sighs, connects Doge's Palace and prison, 16th century
- Copenhagen, Denmark: skywalk connecting courts building to adjacent uses, 18th century
- Faaborg, Funen, Denmark: skywalk in centrum, 18th century

== Environmental factors ==
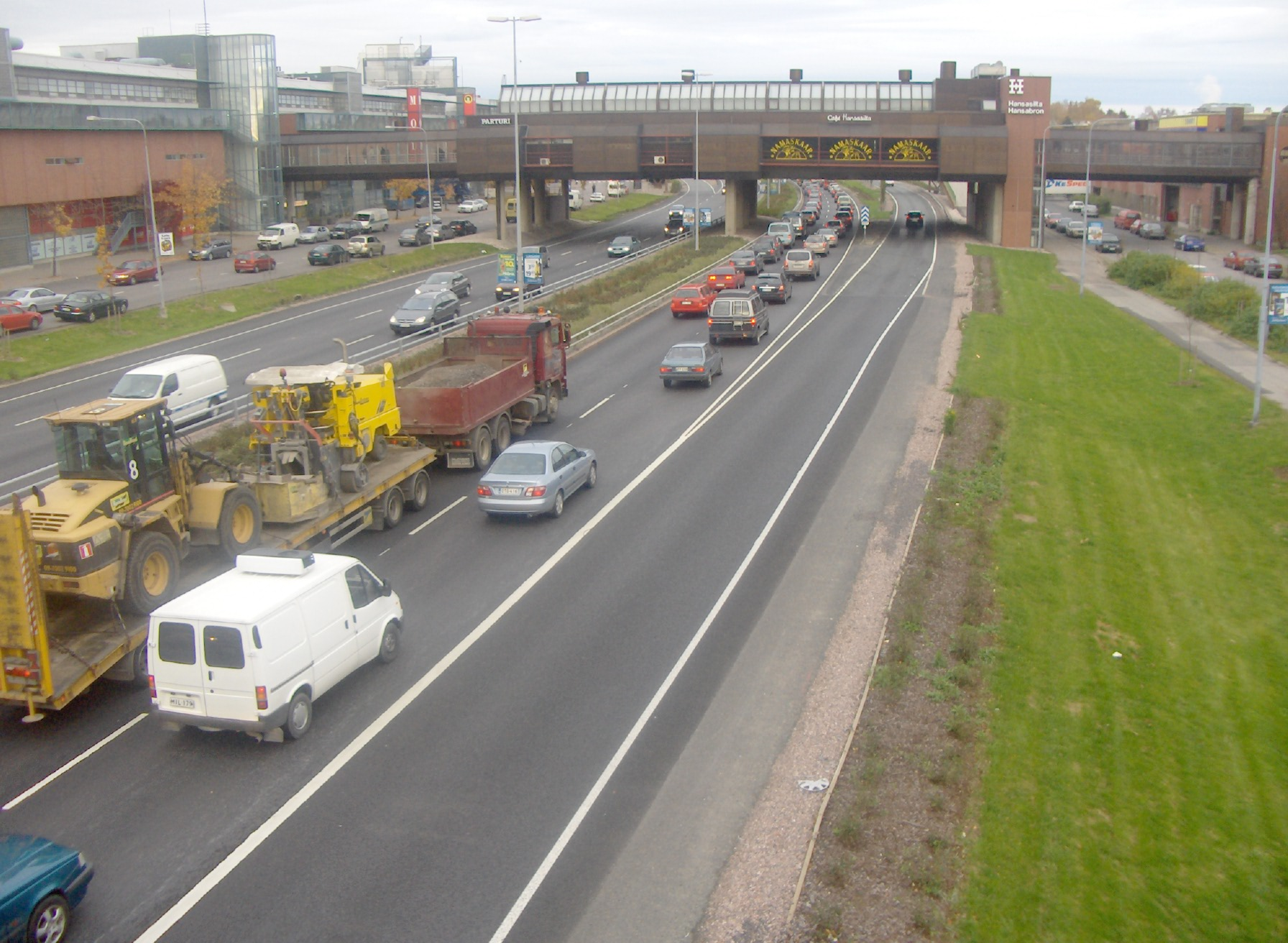
The Hansasilta skyway crossing over the Itäväylä Highway in Itäkeskus, Helsinki, Finland

Besides pedestrian safety and convenience, the chief reasons assigned by urban planners for skywalk development are decrease of traffic congestion, reduction in vehicular air pollution and separation of people from vehicular noise. A number of cities (for example, Spokane, Washington) have given intricate analysis to skywalk systems employing computer models to optimize skywalk layout.

== Negative impacts ==
There is debate about the negative impact on urban areas of skyways. Robertson (1988) noted the negative impacts to street activities, and reductions to the property value at ground level. Woo (2012) found that skywalk systems could be negatively associated with promoting consumerism. Cui (2015) called for more research into the impact of skyways in developing countries. The Cincinnati Skywalk in Ohio was dismantled because of these concerns.

== Cities with notable systems ==
=== North America ===
There are significant skyway networks in many cities in Canada, such as Calgary and Winnipeg, and in the midwestern United States, such as Minneapolis, Saint Paul, Des Moines, Cedar Rapids, Rochester, and Duluth. Most networks in North America are privately owned. Notable exceptions are skyways in Saint Paul and in New York (High Line), which are publicly owned. The largest discontinuous network is in Calgary, Alberta, Canada, and the second largest continuous network is in Minneapolis, Minnesota, U.S., who held the record for the longest until 2025.

| City | System | Length | Blocks connected | Link |
|---|---|---|---|---|
| Atlanta, Georgia | Peachtree Center | | 14 blocks | map |
| Arlington, Virginia | Rosslyn Skywalks | | | map |
| Calgary, Alberta | +15, +30, or +45 Walkway | 16 kilometres (9.9 mi) | ~64 blocks | map |
| Cedar Rapids, Iowa | Cedar Rapids Skywalk System | 1.15 miles (1.85 km) | 15 blocks | map |
| Charlotte, North Carolina | Overstreet Mall | 1.5 miles (2.4 km) | 10 blocks | |
| Chicago, Illinois | Chicago Pedway | | 40 blocks | |
| Dallas, Texas | Dallas Pedestrian Network | 3 miles (4.8 km) | 36 blocks, in two separate networks | map |
| Des Moines, Iowa | Skywalk | 4 miles (6.4 km) | 30 blocks | map |
| Detroit, Michigan | | | 10 buildings, ~ 8 blocks | map |
| Duluth, Minnesota | Skywalk | 3 miles (4.8 km) | ~17 blocks | map |
| Edmonton, Alberta | Edmonton Pedway | 13 kilometres (8.1 mi) | ~13 blocks | map |
| Fargo, North Dakota | | | 6 blocks | |
| Grand Rapids, Michigan | Skywalk | > 1 mile (1.7 km) | 7 blocks – connects 12,000-seat VanAndel Arena, JW Marriott, Amway Grand Plaza and Marriott Courtyard hotels as well as 1,000,000 sq ft (93,000 m^{2}) DeVos Place Convention Center | |
| Halifax, Nova Scotia, Canada | Downtown Halifax Link | | | |
| Houston, Texas | Houston Downtown Tunnel System | > 6 miles (9.7 km) including tunnels | ~35 blocks (95 total) | map |
| Indianapolis, Indiana | Indianapolis Skywalk | | Connects the Indiana Convention Center, Indianapolis Artsgarden, Lucas Oil Stadium, Circle Centre Mall, Indianapolis Union Station, JW Marriott Indianapolis, and 11 other hotels. | map |
| Kansas City, Missouri | "The Link" Crown Center | | 6 | |
| Las Vegas Strip | | | Skyways are provided in lieu of street-level pedestrian crossings. | |
| Lincoln, Nebraska | | | 7 blocks | |
| Los Angeles, California | Calvin S Hamilton Pedway | | 10 blocks | Map |
| Louisville, Kentucky | Louie Link | | A glassed-in skywalk called the Louie Link stretches six city blocks and links together the Kentucky International Convention Center (KICC), Fourth Street Live!, three hotels (Galt House Hotel & Suites, Marriott and Hyatt Regency), and 2,300 hotel rooms. In 2010 it was extended from the Galt House to the new $16 million Skywalk Garage, an eight-level, 860-space parking facility on Third Street, and a second skywalk connects from the garage across Third Street to the new KFC Yum! Center | map |
| Mankato, Minnesota | City Center Campus | ~ 0.5 miles (0.80 km) | 8 blocks | map |
| Milwaukee, Wisconsin | Milwaukee Skywalk | 1.75 mi (2.82 km) | About 8 blocks. Notable connected buildings include: The Avenue, 310W, Hyatt Regency, Baird Center, Chase Tower, Empire Building, 100 East Wisconsin, Hilton Milwaukee City Center | map |
| Minneapolis, Minnesota | Minneapolis Skyway System | 9.5 miles (15.3 km) | >80 blocks | map |
| New York | High Line | > 1.45 miles (2.33 km) | The pedestrian skyway and linear park on 10 m height on former elevated railway. Connects to Hudson Yards and One Manhattan West | map |
| Oklahoma City, Oklahoma | Oklahoma City Underground | | ~30 buildings | |
| Pittsburgh, Pennsylvania | | | 16 blocks | map |
| Rochester, New York | | | 20 buildings over 13 blocks | map |
| Saint Paul, Minnesota | Skyway | > 5 miles (8.0 km) | 47 blocks | map |
| Sioux City, Iowa | | | 13 blocks | map |
| Spokane, Washington | | | 16 blocks | map |
| Toronto, Ontario | SkyWalk | 0.7 km | 2 blocks – Metro Toronto Convention Centre South Building and Union Station (Toronto) | |
| Winnipeg, Manitoba | Winnipeg Walkway | | 18 blocks | |

=== Asia ===
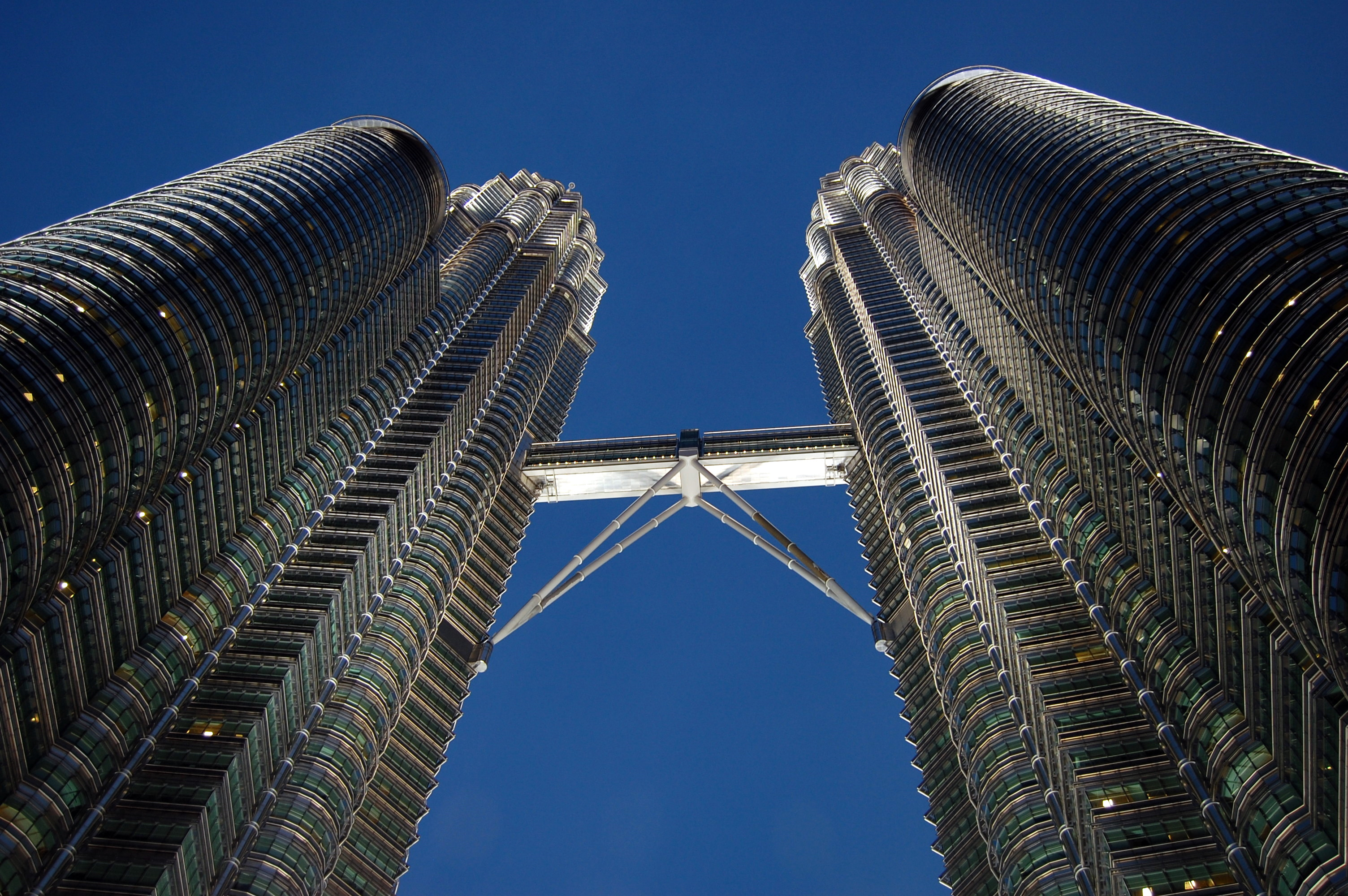
A skybridge connects the two towers of Petronas Towers in Kuala Lumpur

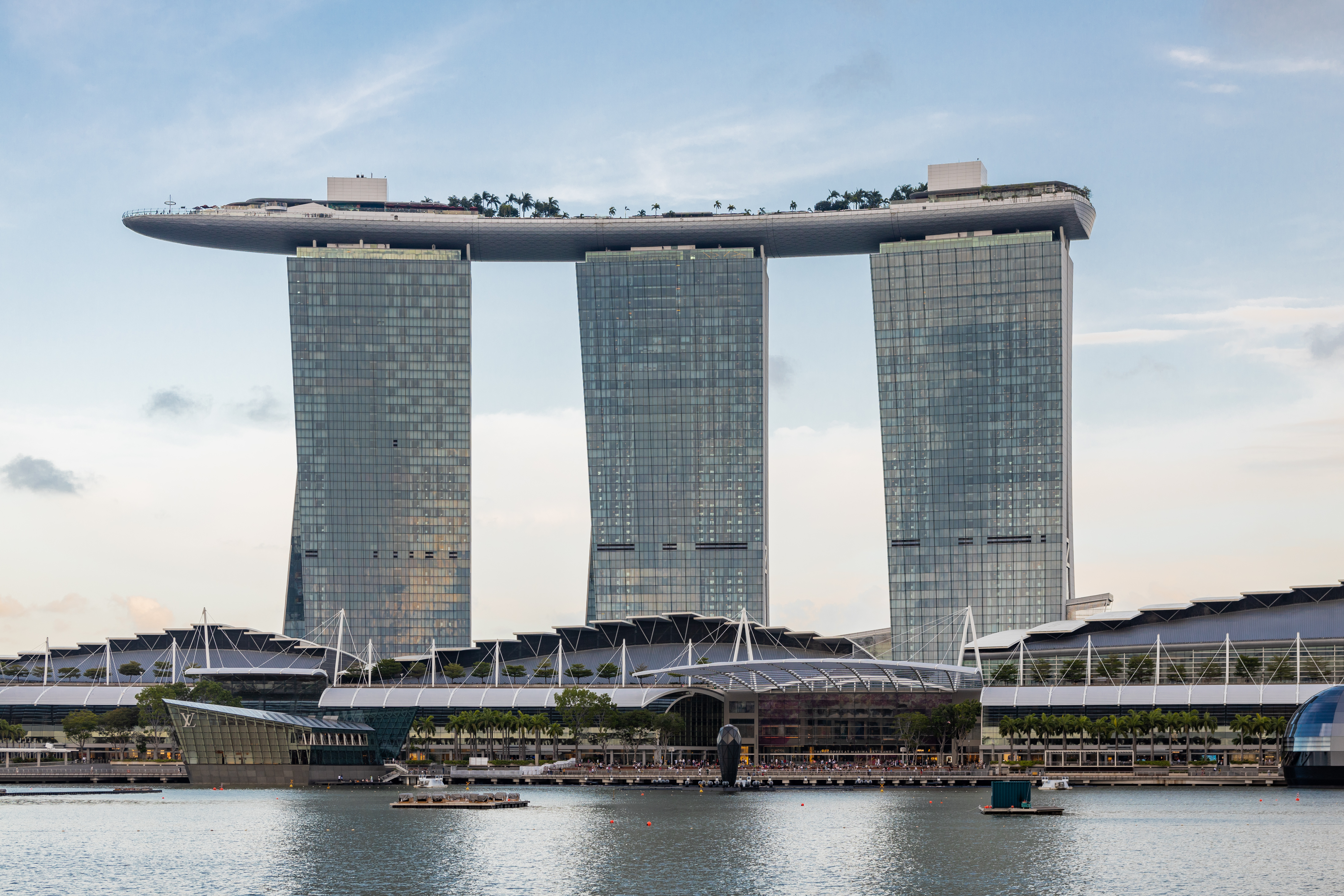
Skybridge atop Marina Bay Sands in Singapore

The highest cantilevered skybridge between separate buildings in the world is in the Raffles City Chongqing skyscrapers complex in Chongqing, China. The world's longest pedestrian hanging skywalk, at 430 meters, is the Zhangjiajie Glass Bridge, which sits between mountain peaks in China. The highest cantilevered skybridge as construction element of building exist atop of Kingdom Centre in Riyadh, Saudi Arabia.

The world's highest 2-story skybridge, 170 m above the ground and 58 m long, between the two towers on 41st and 42nd floors in Petronas Twin Towers dual skyscrapers in Kuala Lumpur, Malaysia, which also has an elevated, air-conditioned walkway from the Kuala Lumpur Convention Centre to Bukit Bintang shopping district. Malaysia also has the mountainarian tourist pedestrian glass-bottom Langkawi Sky Bridge in Langkawi, Kedah.

The world's longest continuous skyway network is in the King Abdullah Financial District in Riyadh, Saudi Arabia, at 15.5 kilometres (9.6 mi). They have held the record since February 2025.

One of the most famous similar cantilevered skybridges, that looks like uppered ship from the bird's-eye and submarine from the ground, known in Singapore's Marina Bay Sands resort complex of skyscrapers.

A hanging pedestrian skybridge supported by two giant hands, Golden Bridge attracts tourists in Ba Na Hills near Da Nang, Vietnam.

In Bangkok, Thailand there are more than 5.4 km of covered wide dedicated elevated skywalks with lighting. These were developed due to lack of proper sidewalks as well as street hawkers and local merchants taking advantage of any sidewalk space as makeshift commercial real estate. Common reasons skywalks were built include to avoid street pollution, dust, wetness from food vendors and/or rain, potholes, long queues, crowds, and uneven pavement, supporting urbanism but probably most importantly, tourism receipts. Most skywalks connect to a BTS station and utilize space underneath the rail line and BTS pillar supports. These skywalks have connector ramps which connect stations to malls seamlessly and are paid for by the malls themselves, otherwise the city and BTS fund walkway development. A 50km long extension project was shelved in 2011 due to funding issues, nevertheless the system is growing organically.

In Hong Kong, there are numerous foot bridge networks across the city. Particularly large networks exists around elevated or at grade MTR stations and connections between malls and housing estates in new town centers. The largest network spans Admiralty, Central and parts of Sheung Wan districts in the CBD and consists of the Central Elevated and Central–Mid-Levels Walkway systems which link up over 40 major office buildings. The Central–Mid-Levels walkway system is the longest outdoor covered escalator system in the world according to Guinness World Records.^{[9][10]} Other large systems exist in Tsuen Wan and Mong Kok.

The Mumbai Skywalk Project, India is a discontinuous network of over 50 km of skywalks in Mumbai Metropolitan Region, India. The skyways connect Mumbai Suburban Railway stations to important junctions, each 1 to 2 km in length. The first of these is a 1.3 km (0.8 mi) long skywalk connecting the suburban regions of Bandra and Kurla.

=== Europe ===
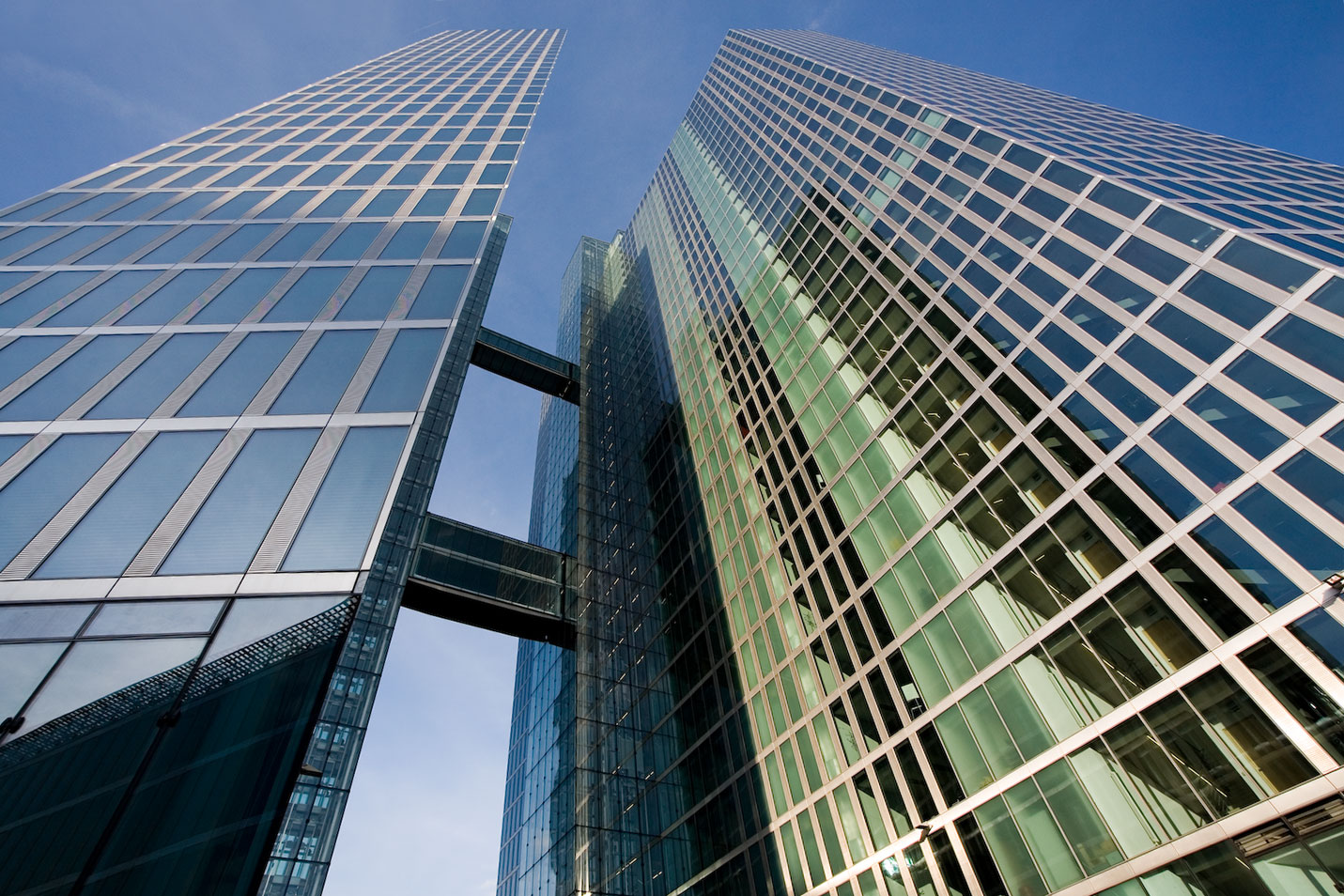
The Highlight Towers in Munich, Germany

Brussels, Belgium has a skyway between the two Belgacom Towers.

London has skywalks on the Barbican Estate and London Wall. The City of London Pedway Scheme was devised as part of the post World War II reconstruction plans for London, it was put into effect mainly from the mid-1950s to the mid-1960s and eventually abandoned by the 1980s. Shad Thames has picturesque skyways between former warehouses, used in part to roll barrels between them.

Liverpool conceived a project of building skyways around the city centre during the 1960s. The project saw bridges linking key buildings around the city centre, such as James Street railway station, Moorfields railway station and New Hall Place. Crime and low usage of the bridges stopped the project being fully imagined and by the end of the year 2000 nearly all of bridges had been removed, though evidence of the scheme still exists in some places.

Sheffield, South Yorkshire has a famous skyway between two blocks of flats in the Park Hill Estate housing block with the phrase "I Love You Will U Marry Me" graffitied onto it. It has since become the subject of songs by local singers and bands such as Arctic Monkeys and Yungblud.

The twin towers of the Highlight Towers in Munich, Germany are joined by two skyways made of glass and steel.

The Promenade Plantée in the 12th arrondissement of Paris, France includes pedestrian bridges and a linear park on an aqueduct of a former railway.

=== Australia ===
- Melbourne, Australia, four blocks and Airport

== Gallery ==
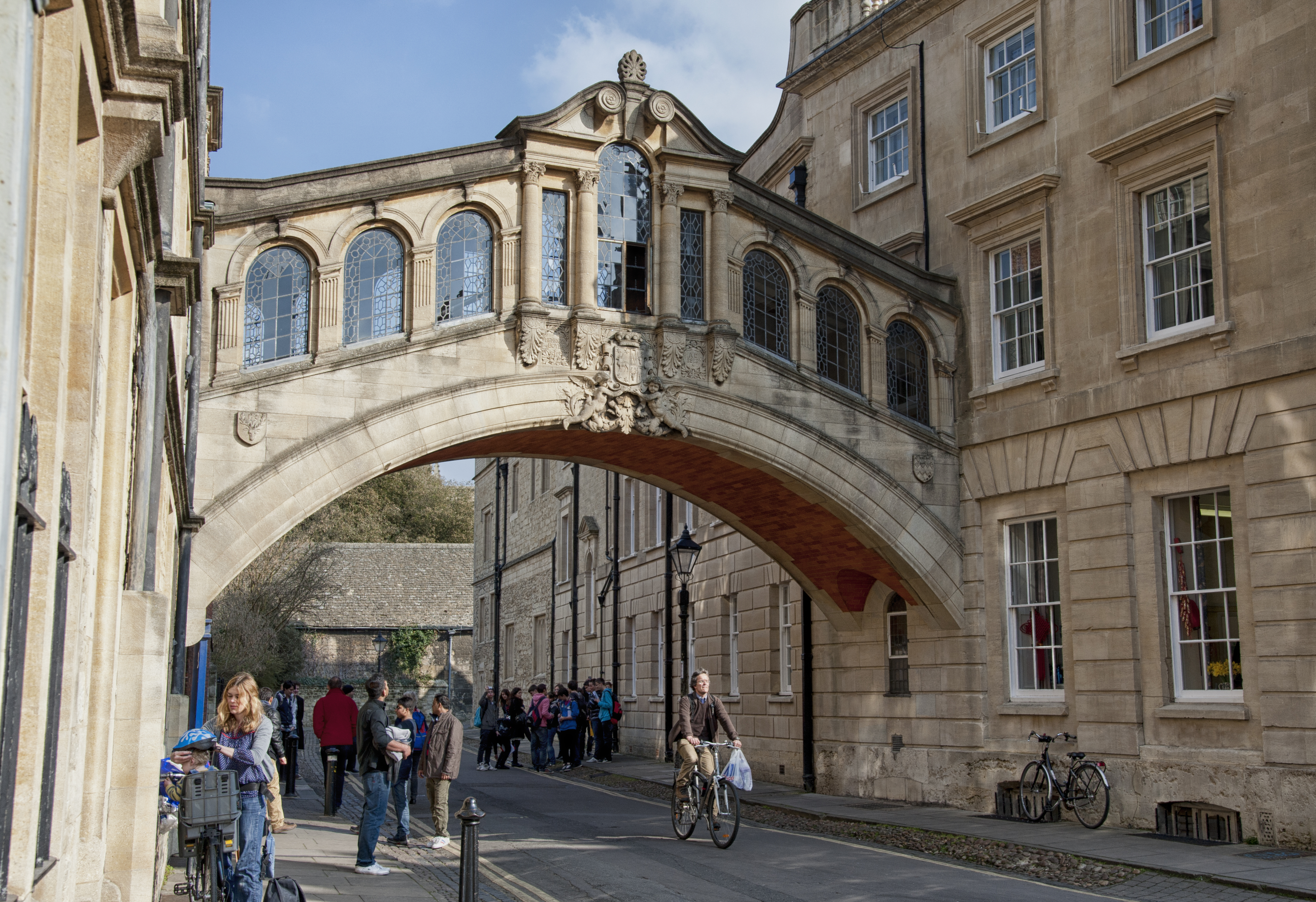
Bridge of Sighs in Oxford

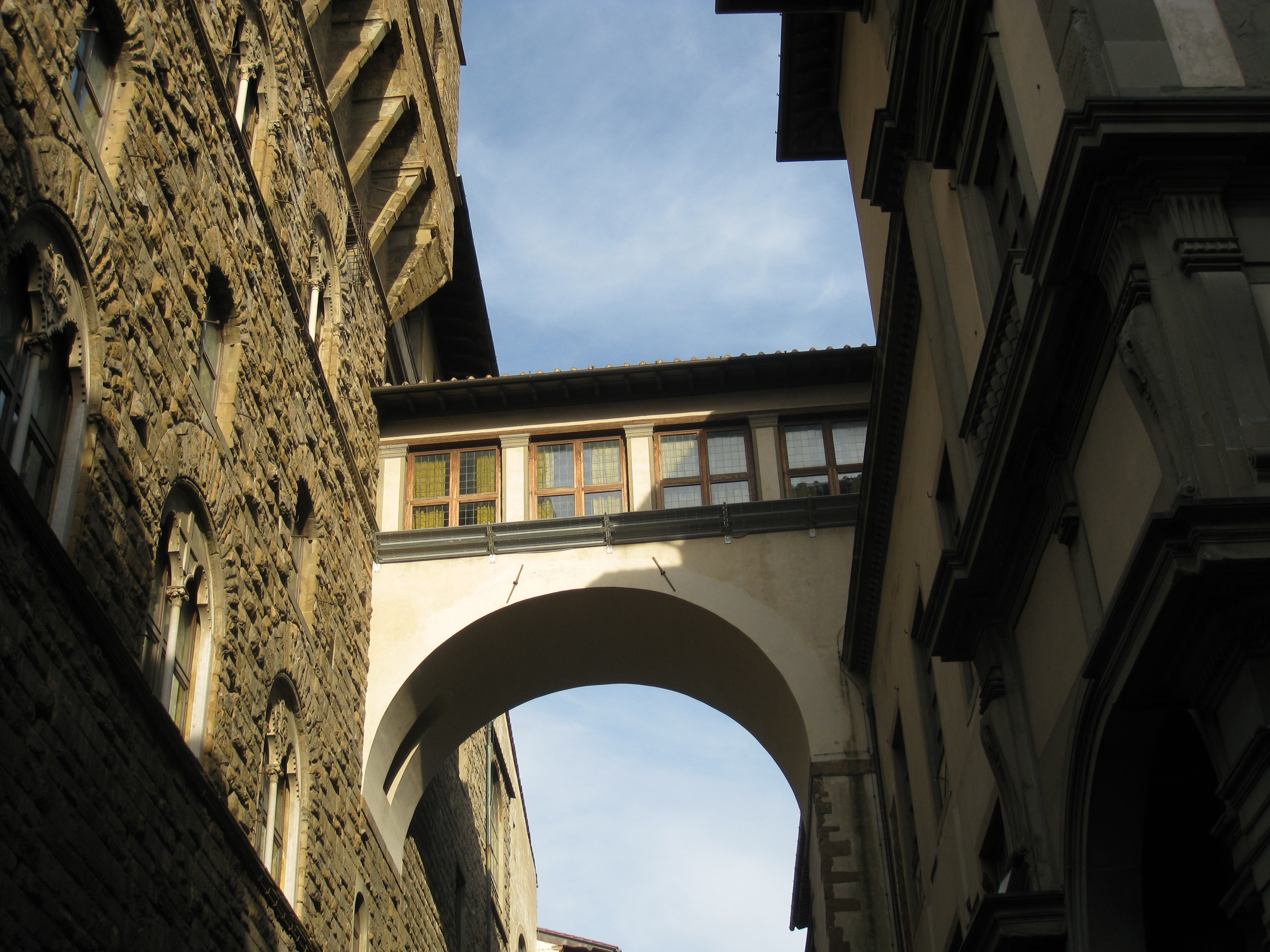
Vasari Corridor in Florence

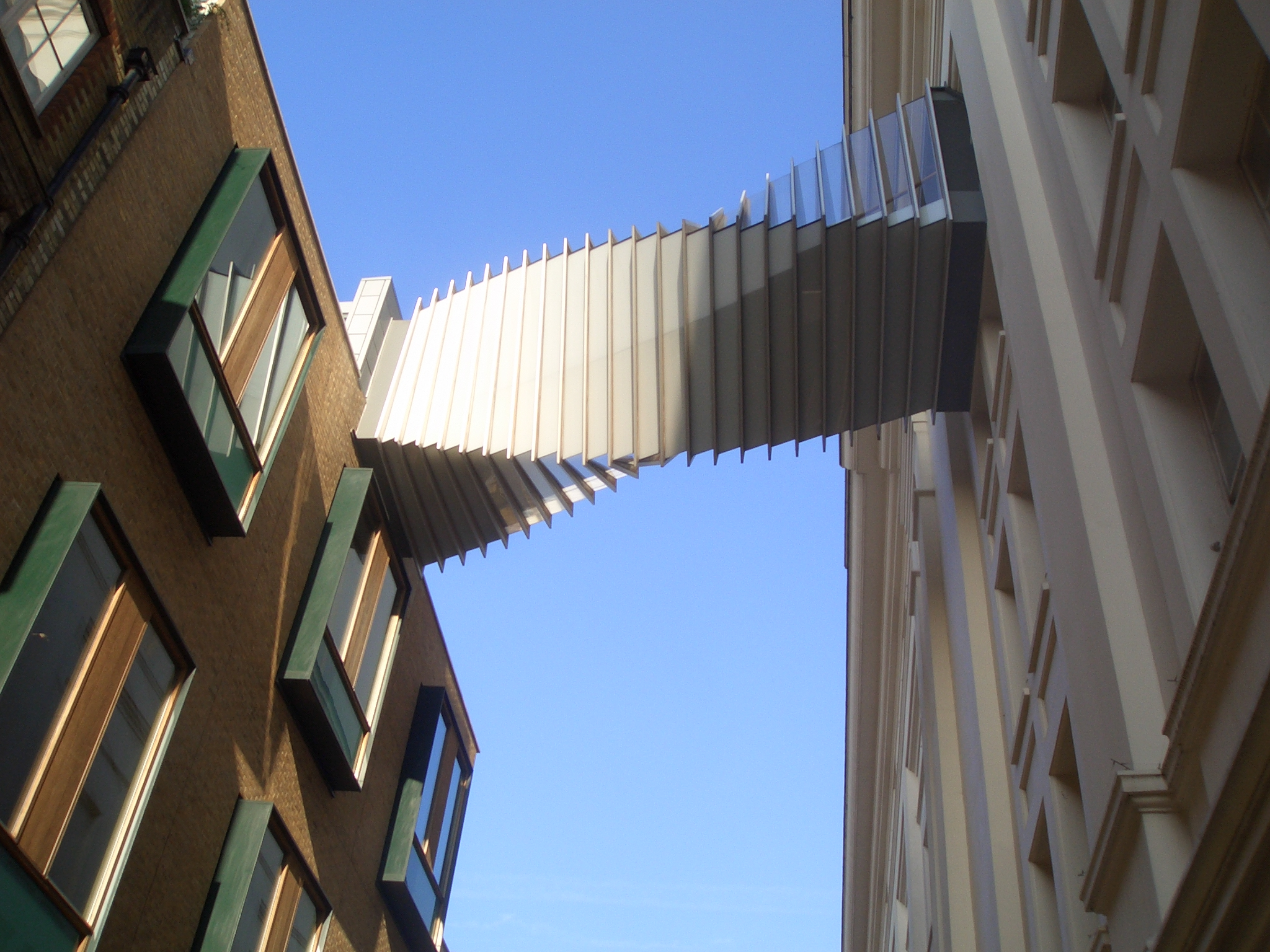
The Bridge of Aspiration, a skybridge in Covent Garden, London

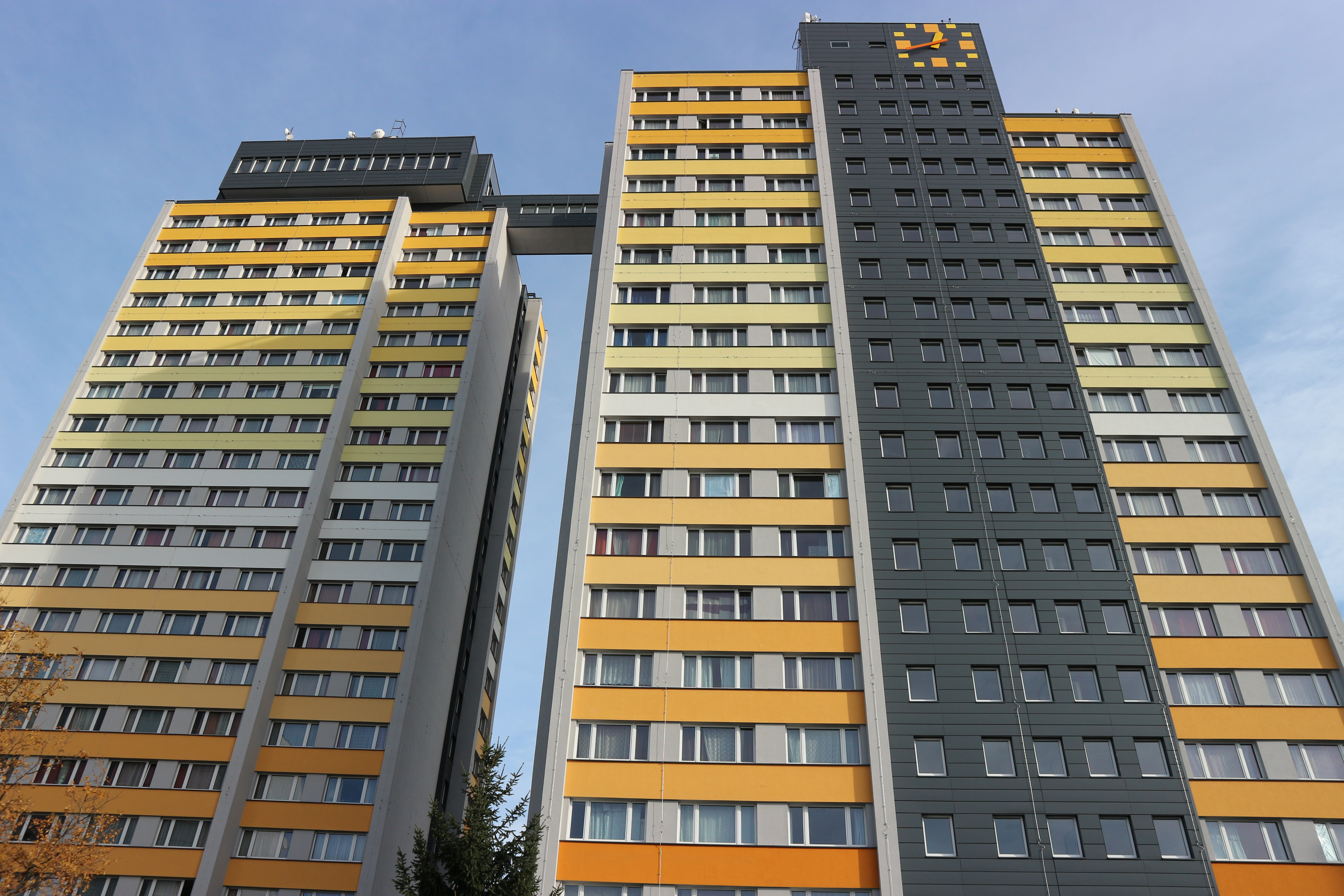
Hotel Kupa, Prague-Háje, Czechia

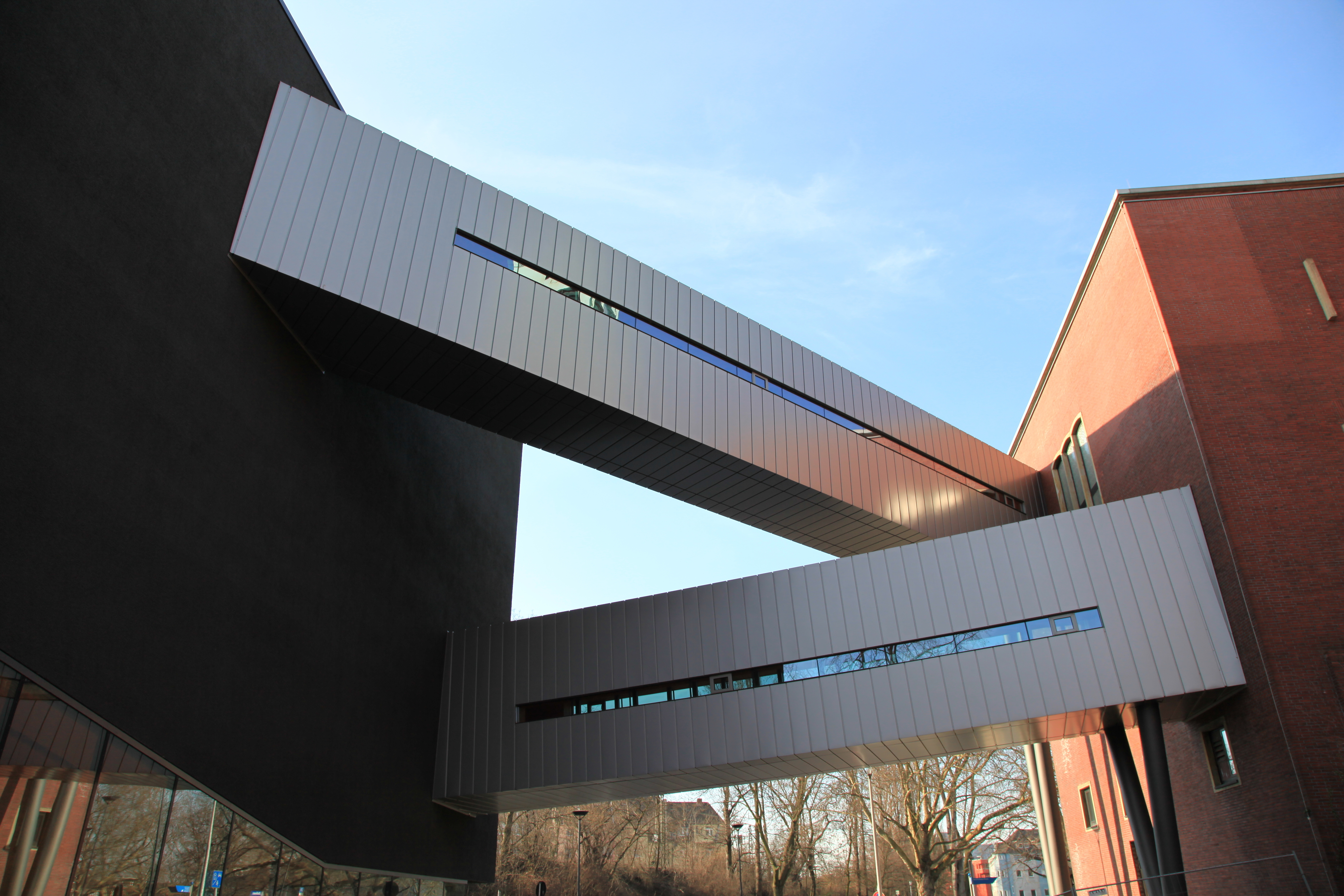
German Mining Museum in Bochum

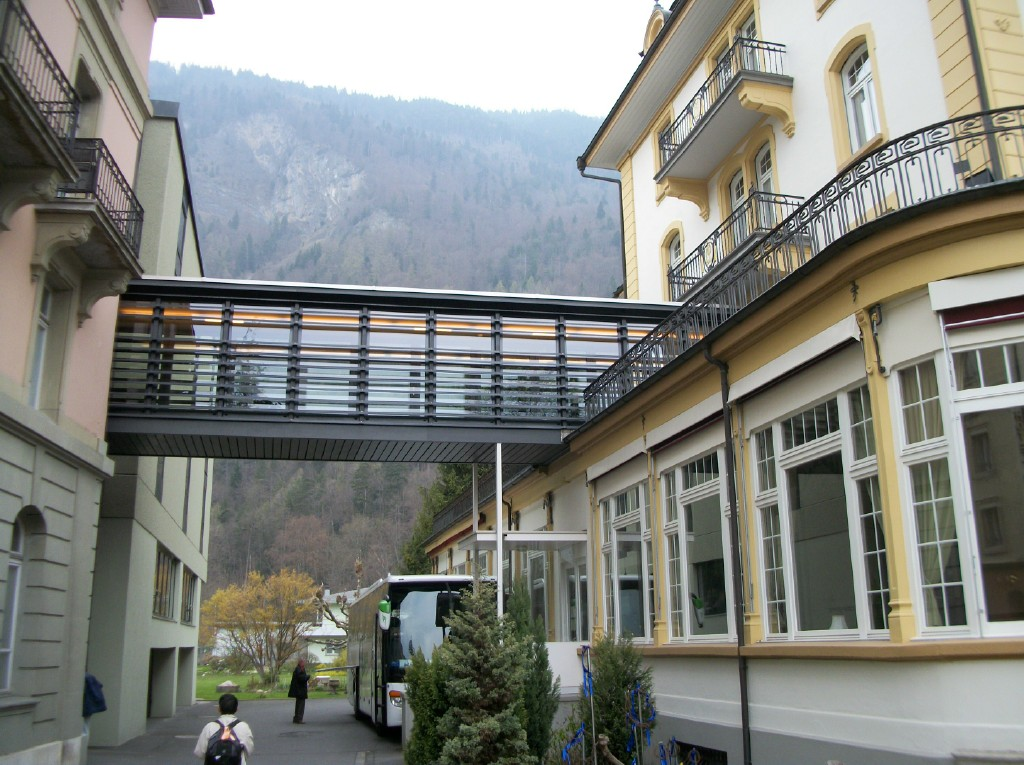
Skyway in Interlaken, Switzerland

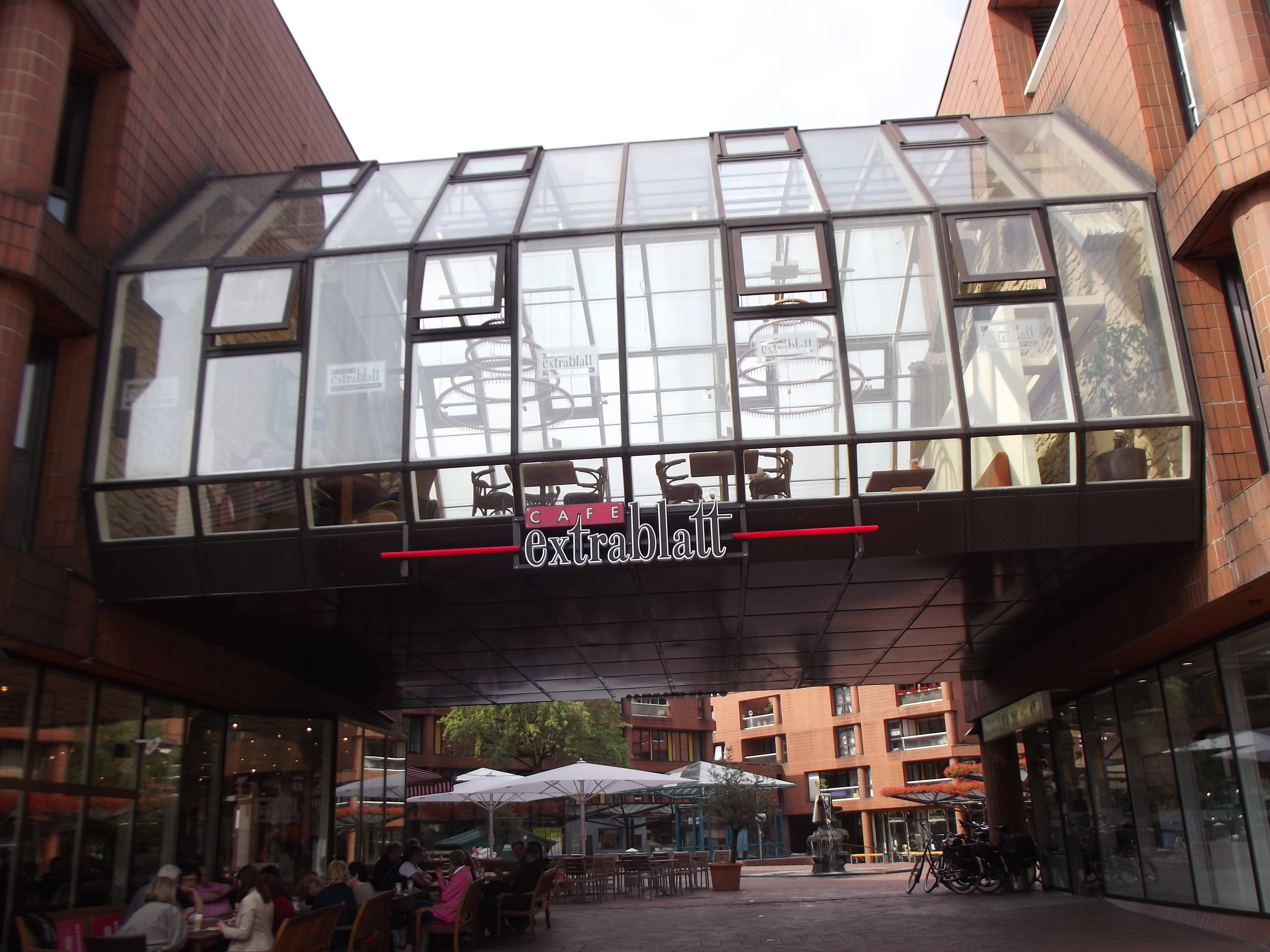
A Skyway serving as part of a café, Münster, Germany

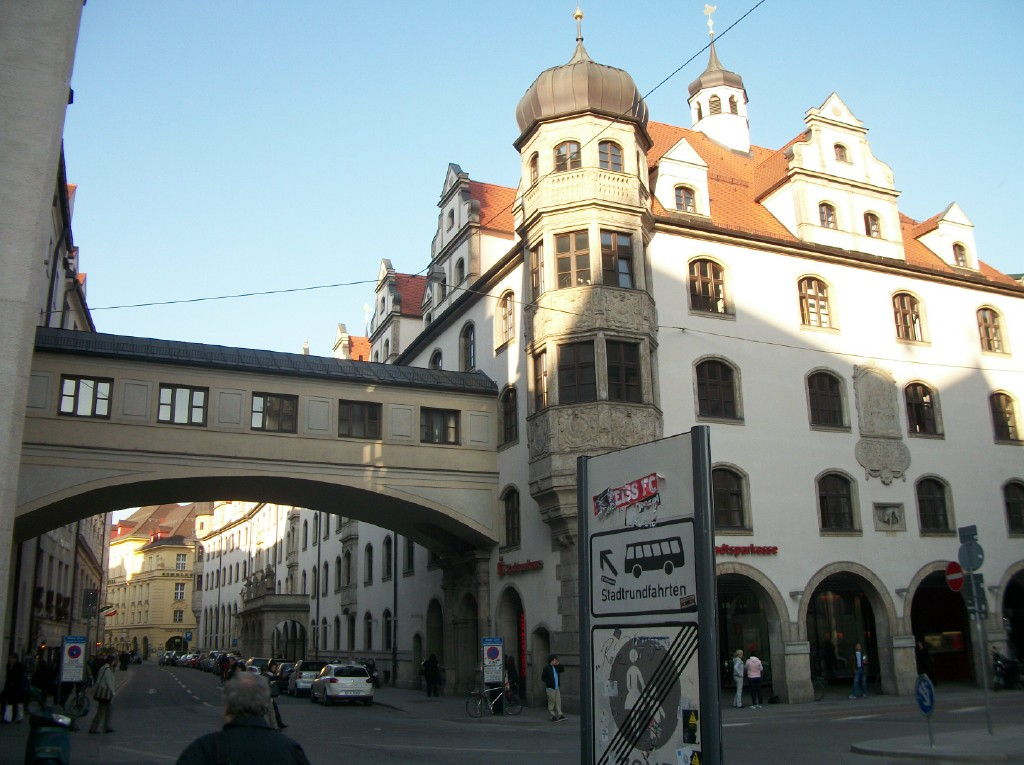
Skyway in Munich, Bavaria

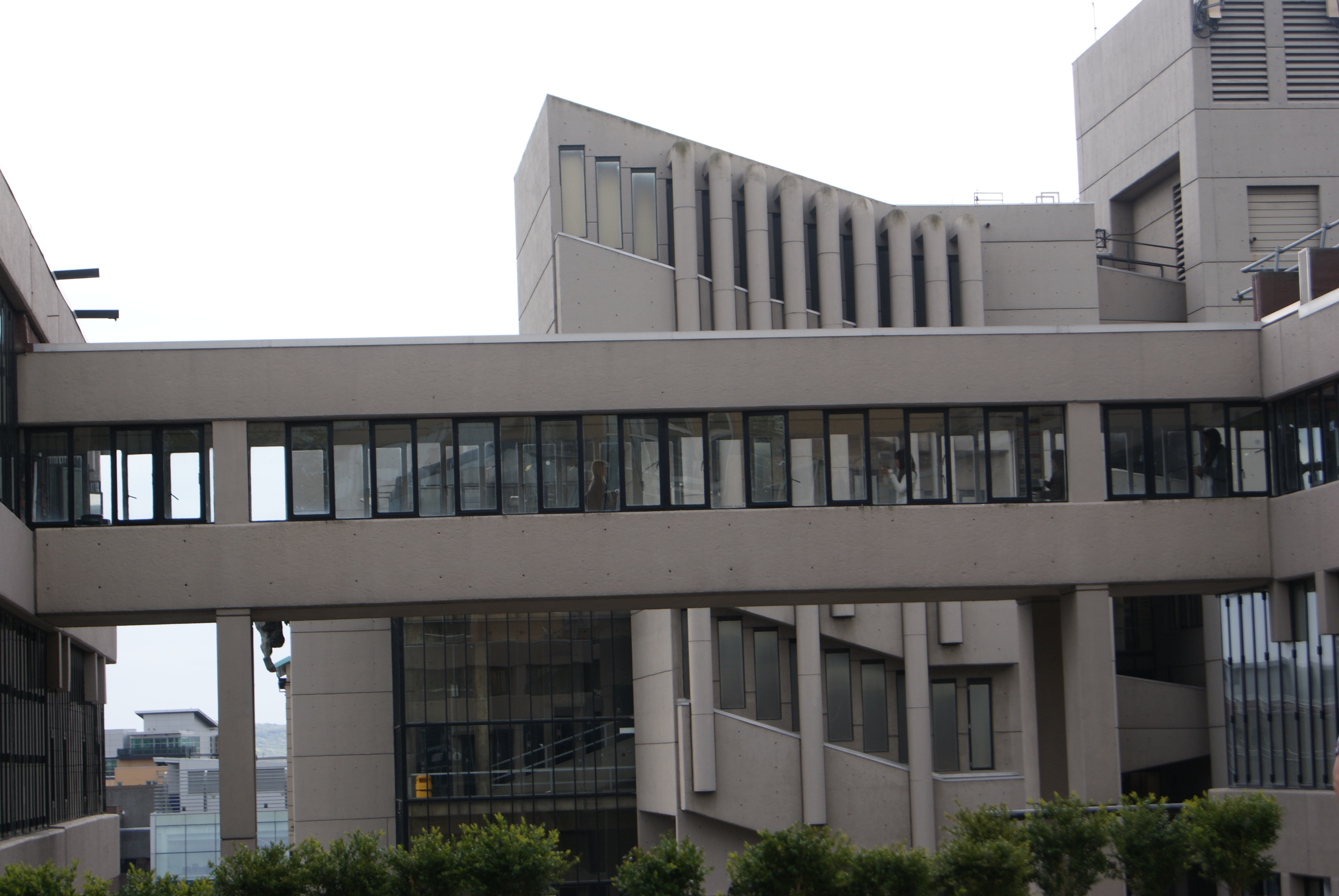
A Brutalist skyway at the University of Leeds, England

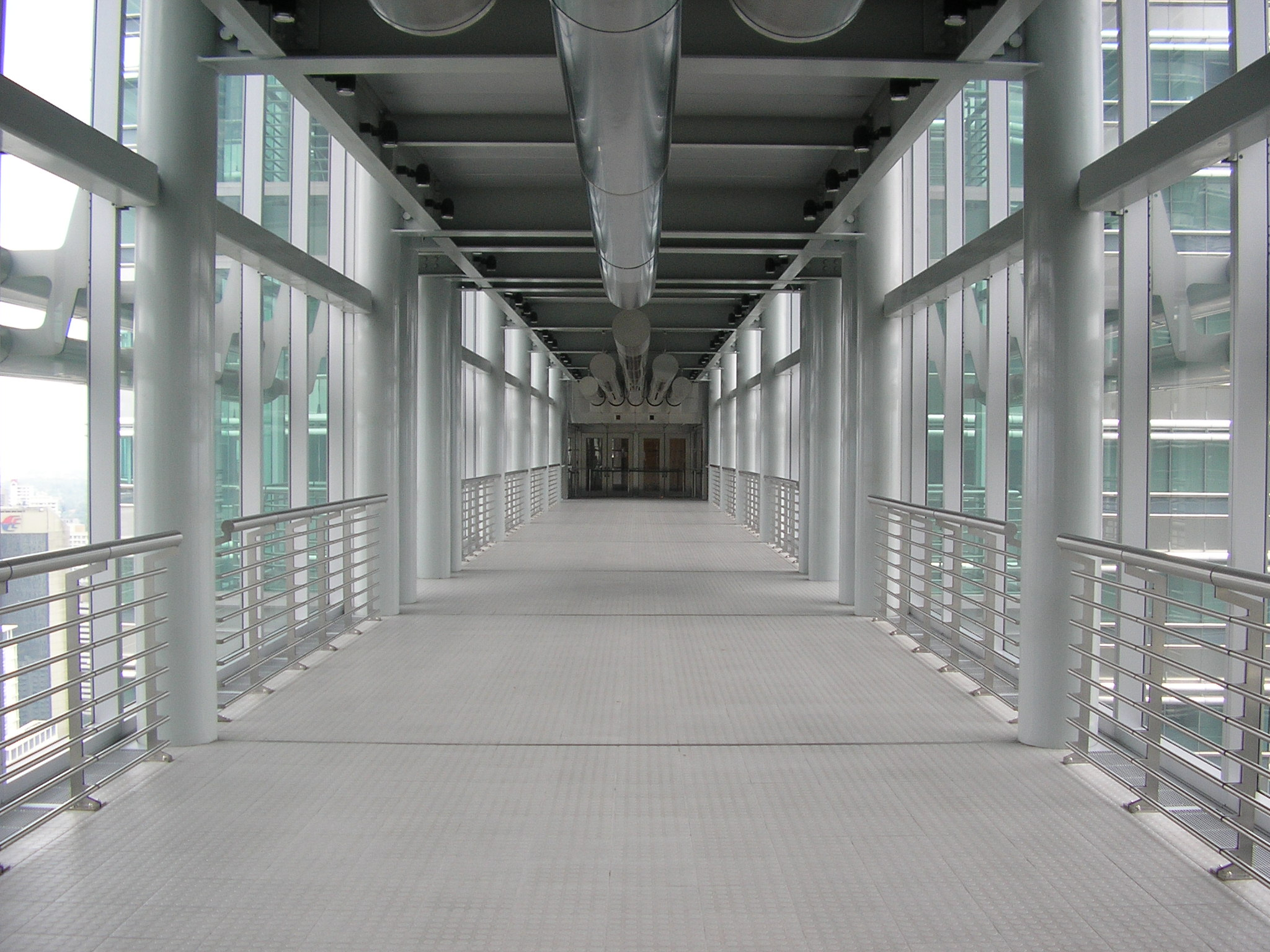
An inside view of the skybridge of Petronas Towers

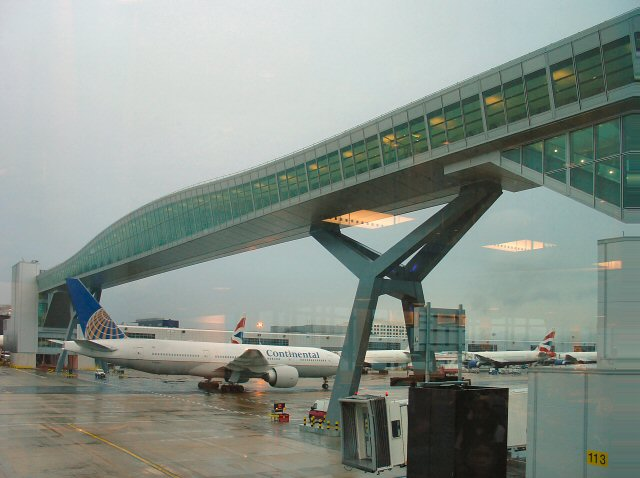
This skyway at London Gatwick Airport is designed to allow aircraft to pass under

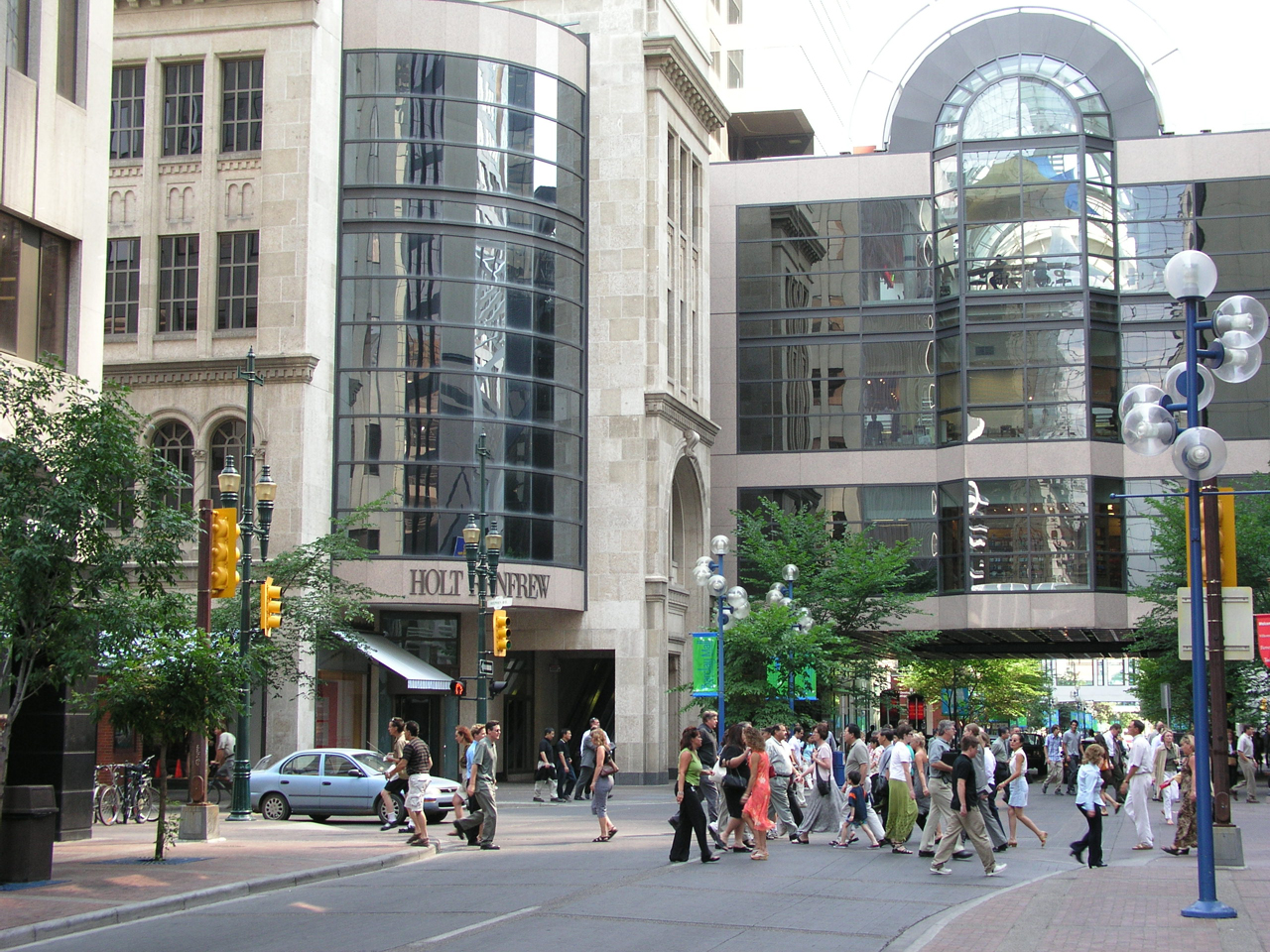
A three-storey bridge at The Core Shopping Centre in Calgary

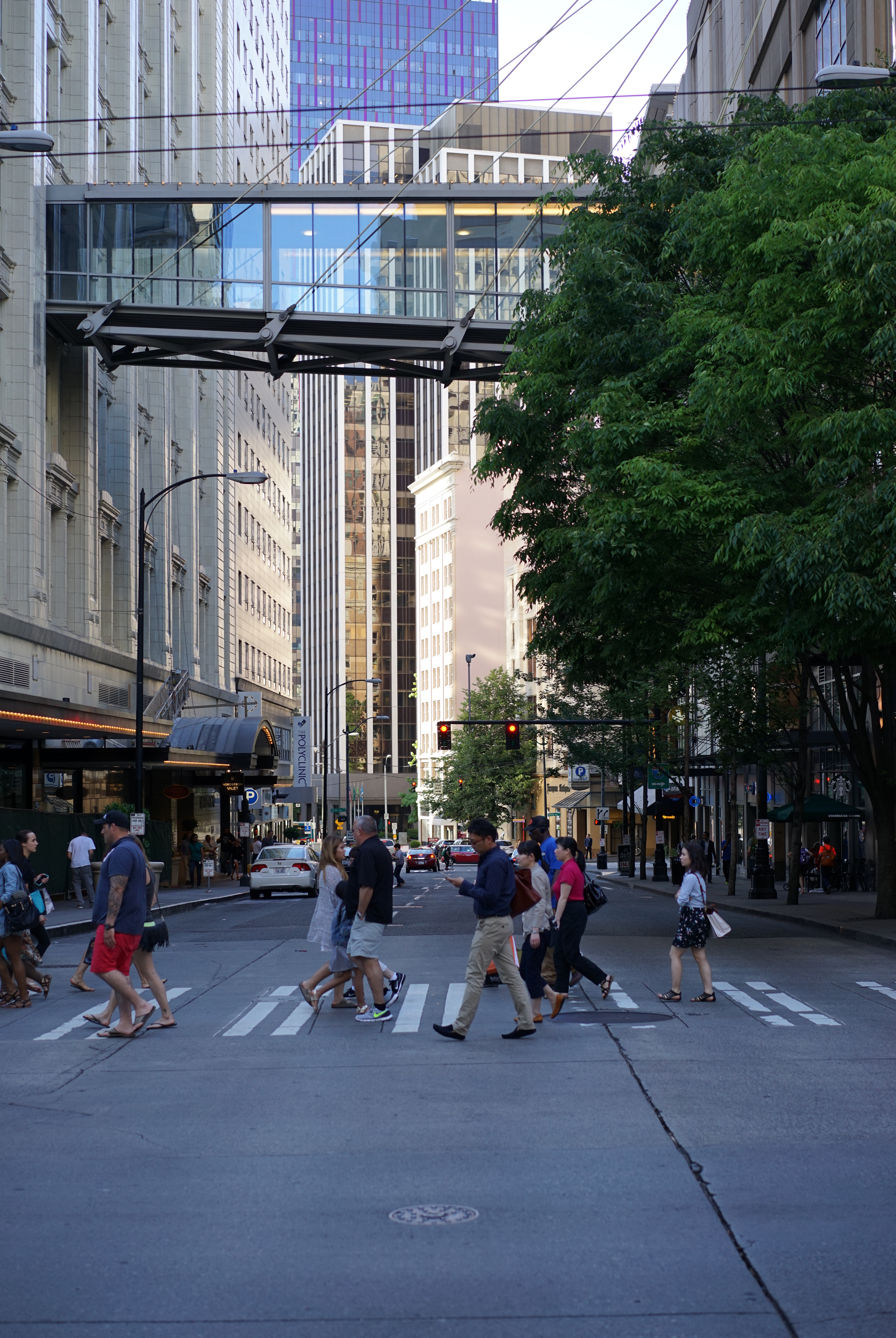
Skyway at 6th Avenue at Pine St in Seattle

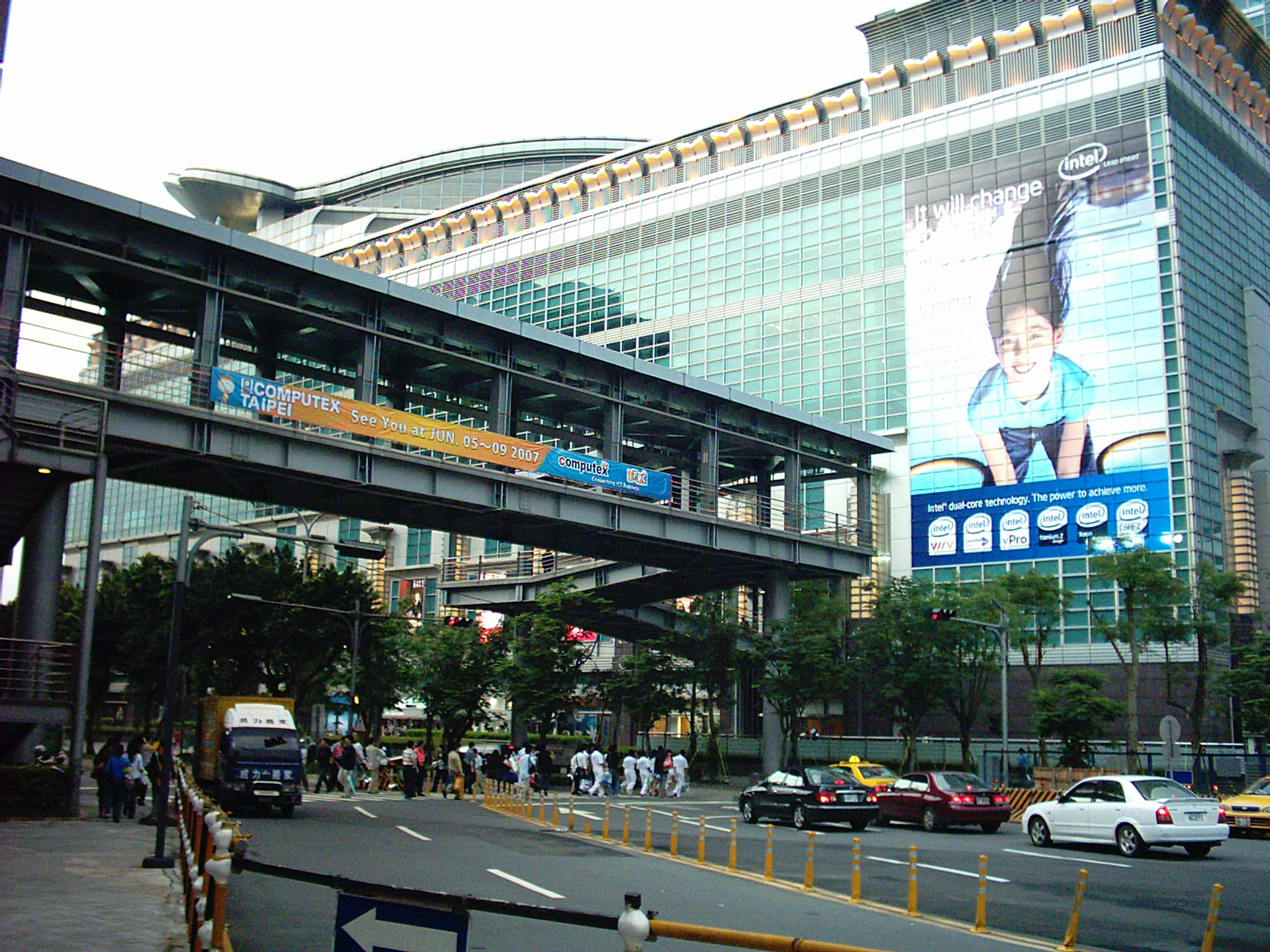
The skyway system in Taipei

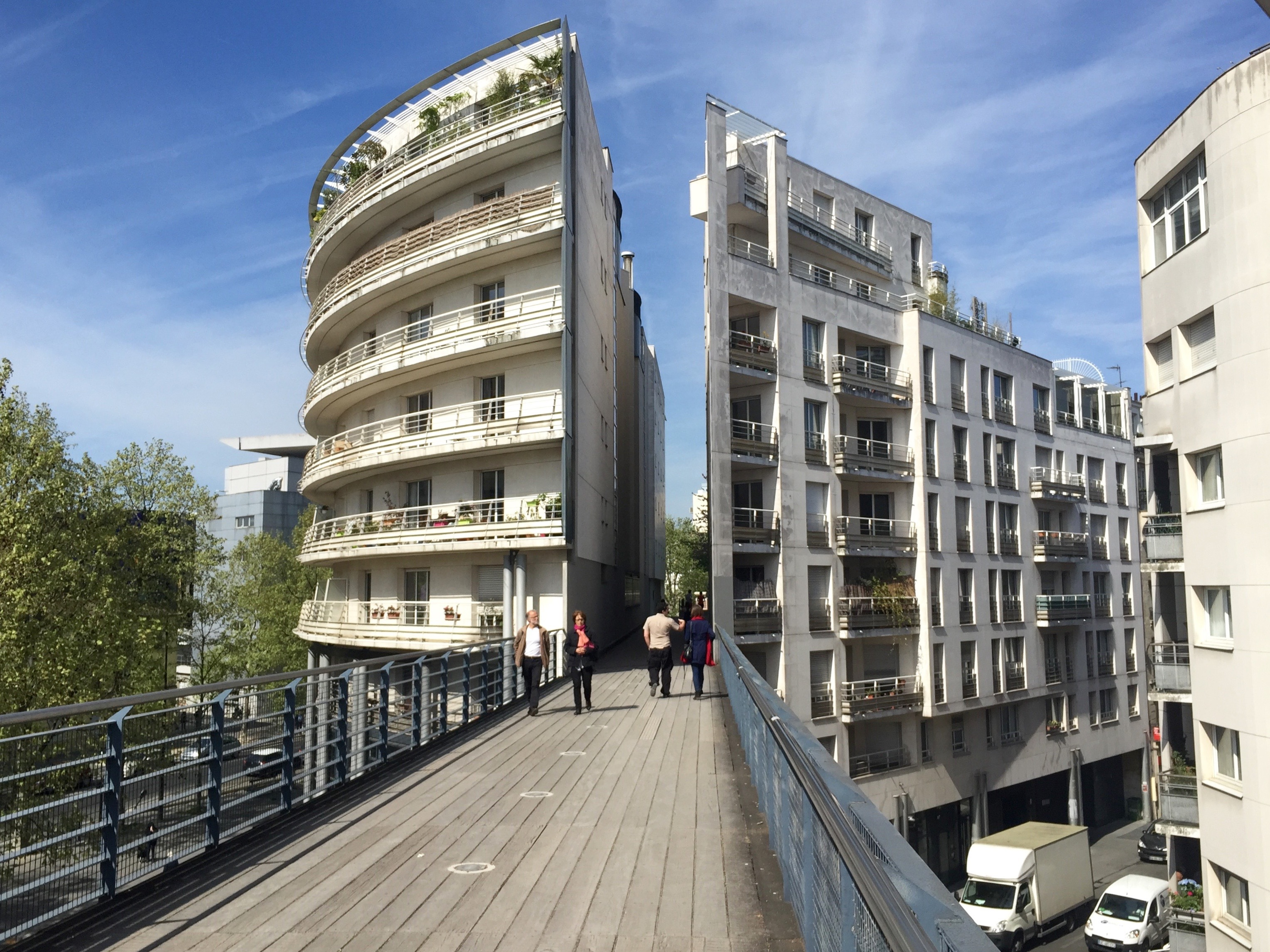
Promenade Plantée in Paris

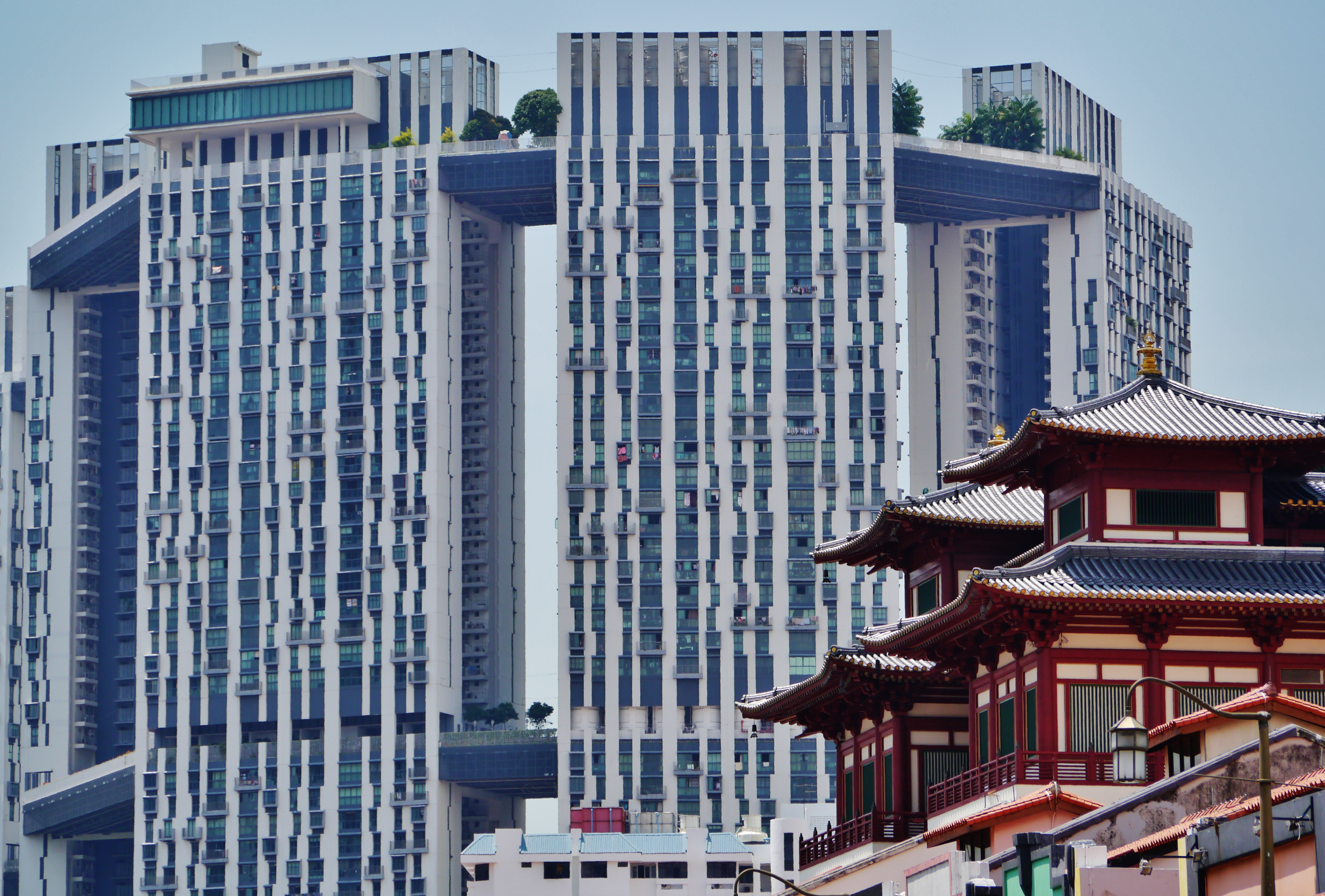
The Pinnacle@Duxton in Singapore

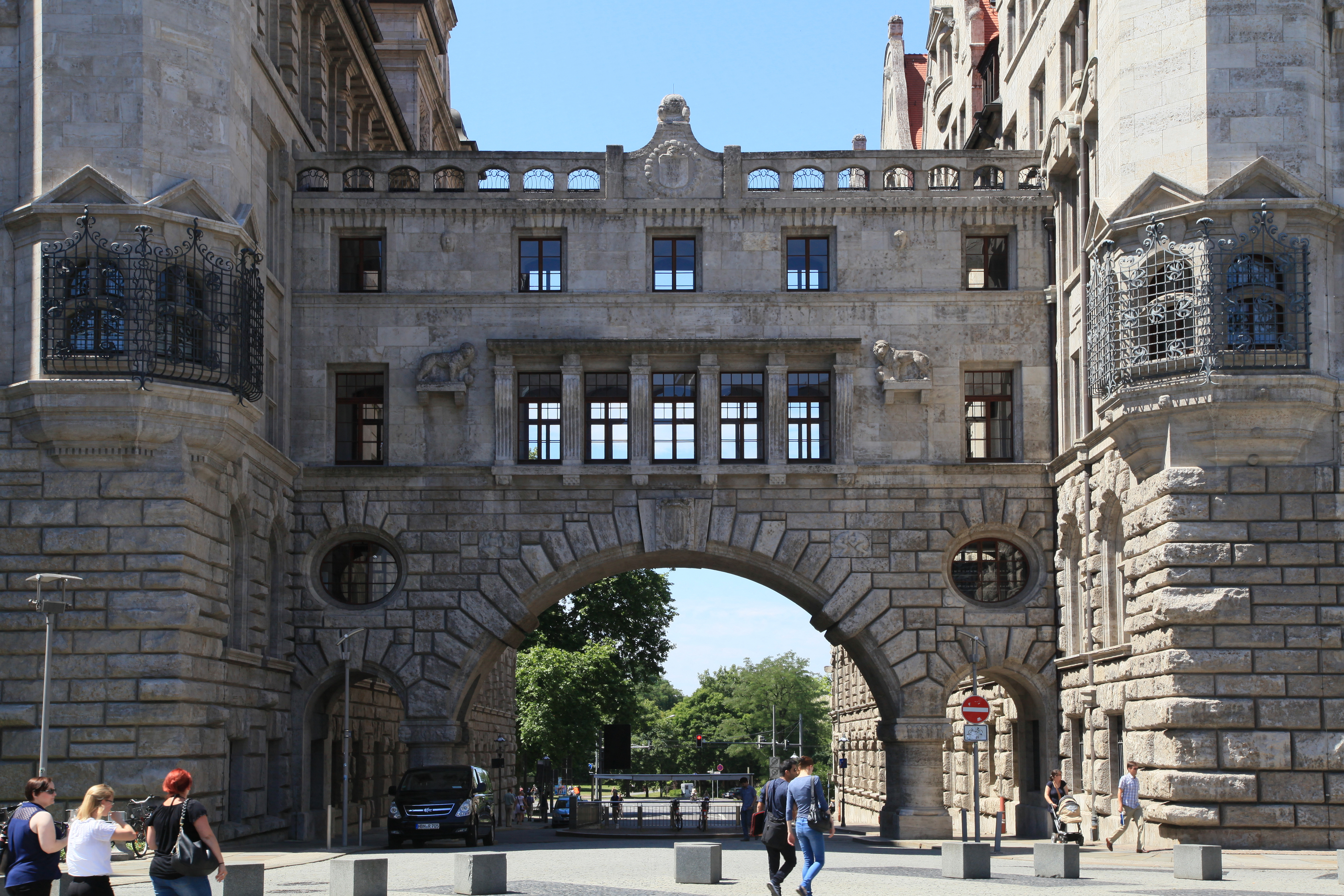
Neues Rathaus in Leipzig

== See also ==
- Catwalk – A narrow footbridge or walkway to allow workers access to parts of a structure
- Footbridge – A bridge for pedestrians
- Glass Bridge, skywalk with glass bottom
- Overpass – A bridge, road or railway crossing over another road or railway
- Pedestrian separation structure – Any structure which separates pedestrians from the roadway
- Pedway – Pedestrian walkways, includes both skyways and underground walkways
- Sidewalk – Pedestrian path along the side of a road
