= Los Angeles Pedway =

Transportation system in Los Angeles

The Los Angeles Pedway system (also known as the Calvin S. Hamilton Pedway) is a Skyway in Downtown Los Angeles, California. The Skyway connects many of the buildings in Bunker Hill via the World Trade Center.

The Pedway was envisioned in the 1970 "Concept Los Angeles" general plan and was a priority project of then planning director Calvin Hamilton. The plan called for an automated people mover that would ferry commuters from two new parking garages on the outskirts of downtown into Bunker Hill and the Financial District, with the pedways allowing workers to move from the people mover to their offices all without ever interacting with traffic. Similar people mover systems were built in Miami and Jacksonville and many US cities have climate controlled pedway systems such as Minneapolis and Houston, but Los Angeles' is unique in that it is open-air.

The beginnings of the pedway system were built beginning in 1975 and remain standing, but the people mover was never fully built out. The system was heavily reliant on federal funding, which evaporated in 1981. The pedway remains open to the public, but the shops and vendors that were envisioned to line them and serve its patrons never materialized.

== Buildings Connected ==
- Westin Bonaventure
- World Trade Center
- Bank of America Plaza
- Union Bank Plaza
- FourFortyFour South Flower
- City National Plaza
- Ketchum Downtown YMCA
- American University Preparatory School
- L.A. Grand Hotel
- The Park DTLA
- Skye at Bunker Hill Apartments
