= Zhangjiajie Glass Bridge =

Glass-bottom bridge in Hunan, China

Zhangjiajie Glass Bridge 张家界大峡谷玻璃桥
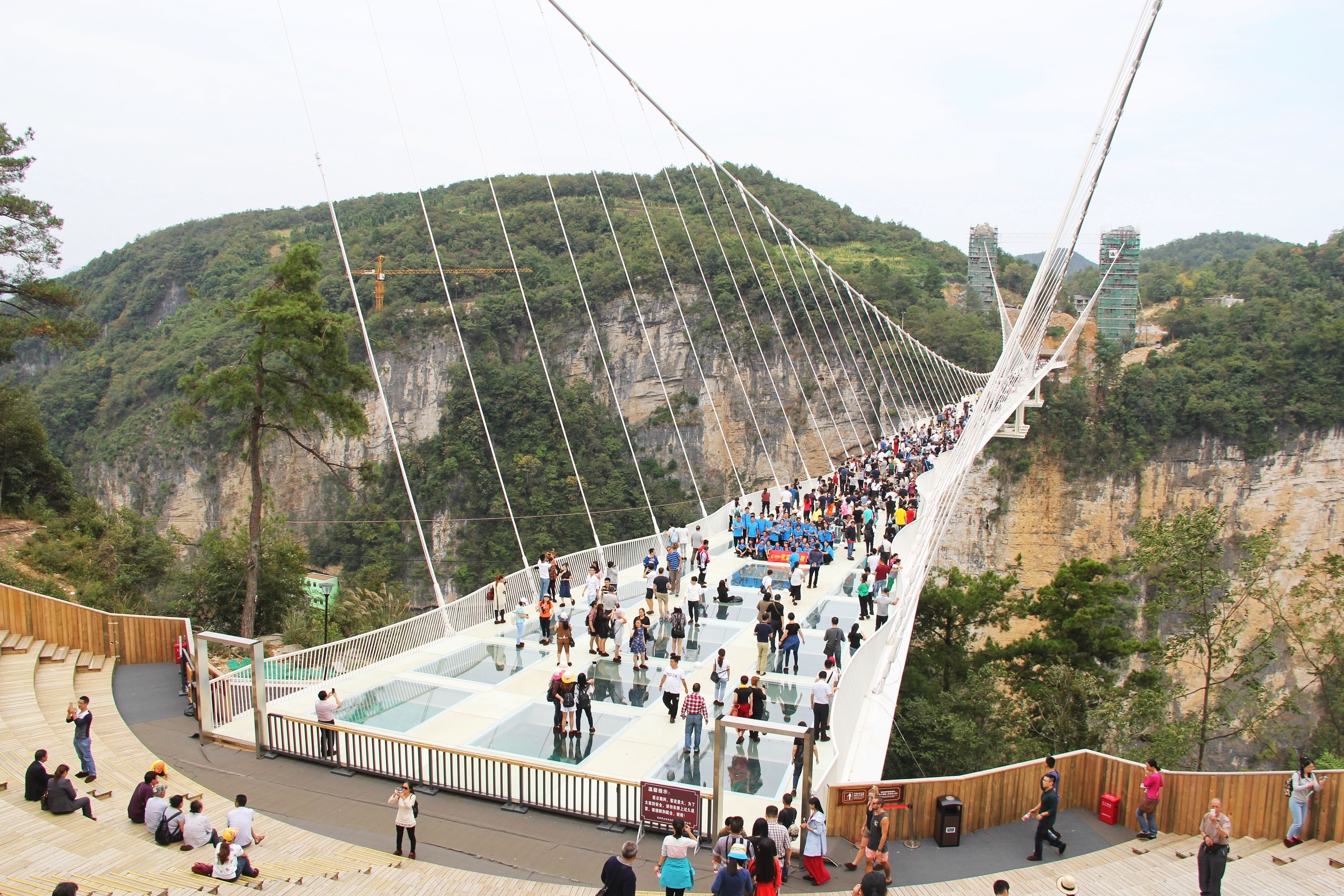
- Coordinates: 29.3987°N 110.6982°E
- Carries: Person(s)
- Locale: Zhangjiajie, Hunan

Characteristics
- Design: Suspension
- Material: Steel
- Width: 14 m (46 ft)
- Height: 360 m (1,180 ft)
- Longest span: 430 m (1,410 ft)
- Clearance below: 300 m (980 ft)

History
- Opened: 20 August 2016

Statistics
- Daily traffic: 8,000

Zhangjiajie Glass Bridge
- Simplified Chinese: 张家界大峡谷玻璃桥
- Traditional Chinese: 張家界大峽谷玻璃橋
- Literal meaning: Zhangjiajie Grand Canyon Glass Bridge
Transcriptions
Standard Mandarin
- Hanyu Pinyin: Zhāngjiājiè Dà Xiágǔ Bōlí Qiáo

Official Chinese stylized name
- Simplified Chinese: 云天渡
- Traditional Chinese: 雲天渡
- Literal meaning: Cloud Sky Crossing
Transcriptions
Standard Mandarin
- Hanyu Pinyin: Yún Tiān Dū

Zhangjiajie Glass footpath is a skywalk bridge in Zhangjiajie, Hunan, China above the Wulingyuan area. The bridge, built as an attraction for tourists, is glass-bottomed and is transparent. When it opened it was the longest and tallest glass bottomed bridge in the world. The bridge, opened to the public on 20 August 2016, measures 430 metres (1,410 ft) in total length and 6 metres (20 ft) in width, and is suspended about 300 metres (980 ft) above the ground. The bridge spans the canyon between two mountain cliffs in Zhangjiajie National Forest Park in the northwest of Hunan province. It is designed to carry up to 800 visitors at a time. The bridge was designed by Israeli architect Haim Dotan.

To build the bridge, engineers erected four support pillars on the edges of the walls of the canyon. The bridge is made of a metal frame with more than 120 glass panels. Each of these panels is three-layered and is a 5.1-centimetre-thick (2 in) slab of tempered glass. There are three long swings attached to the underside of the bridge. There is also a provision for making a 285-metre (935 ft) bungee jump, considered to be the highest bungee jump in the world.

According to the Management Committee of the Bridge, the bridge has set ten world records spanning its design and construction. The record as longest glass bridge has since passed to a glass bridge in the Grand Canyon Scenic Area, Hebei.

== Closures ==
On 2 September 2016, just 13 days after the bridge was opened, the authorities put out a notice saying that they were closing the bridge due to overwhelming visitor traffic. The bridge, designed to hold 800 people at a time and expected to be visited by about 8,000 people per day, had reportedly attracted more than 80,000 visitors per day. The authorities said that the government decided to suspend operations due to the "urgency to improve and update" the attraction, including its car parks, ticket-booking system, and customer service. The bridge reopened on 30 September 2016.

== Gallery ==
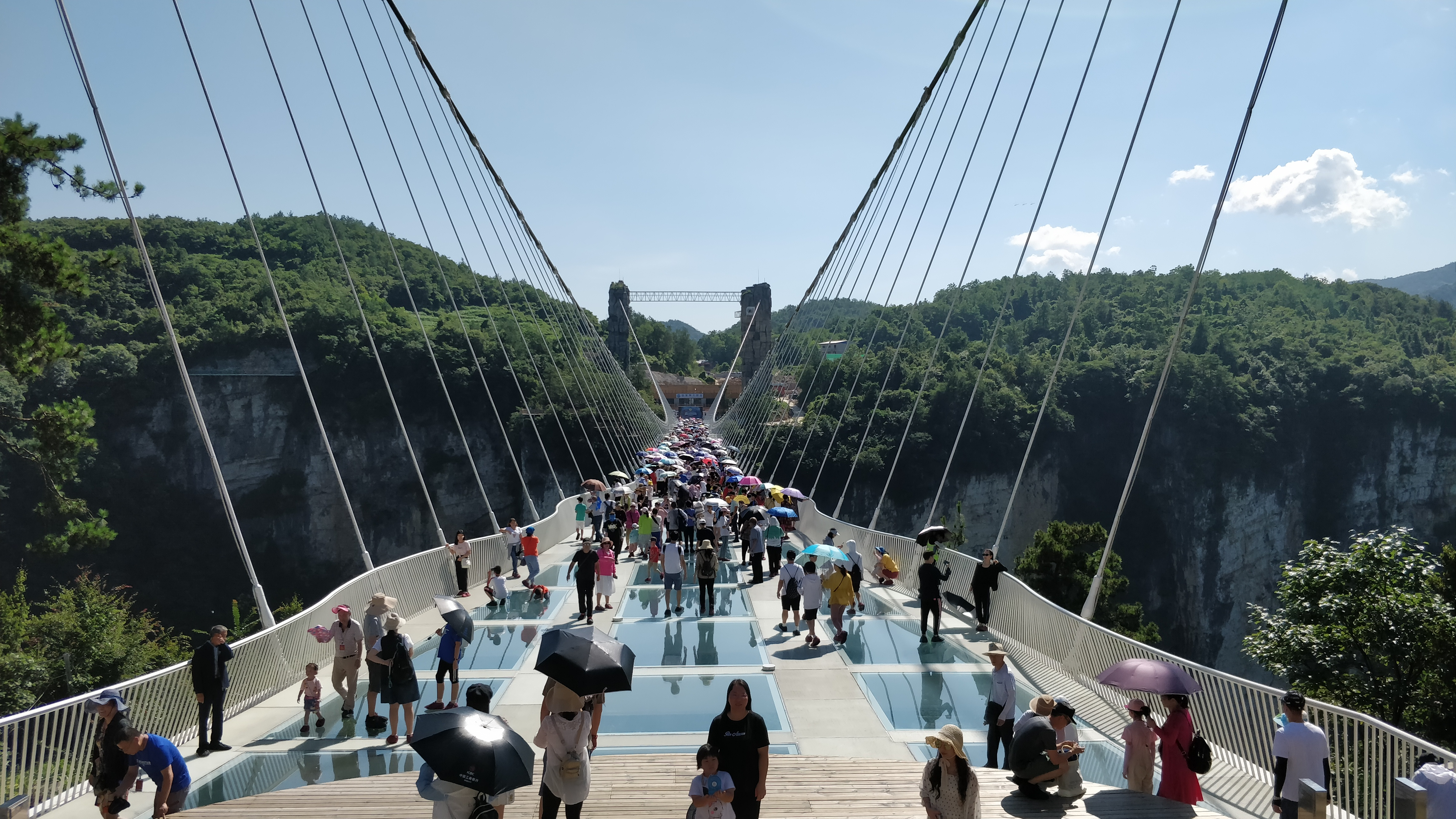
Centre view

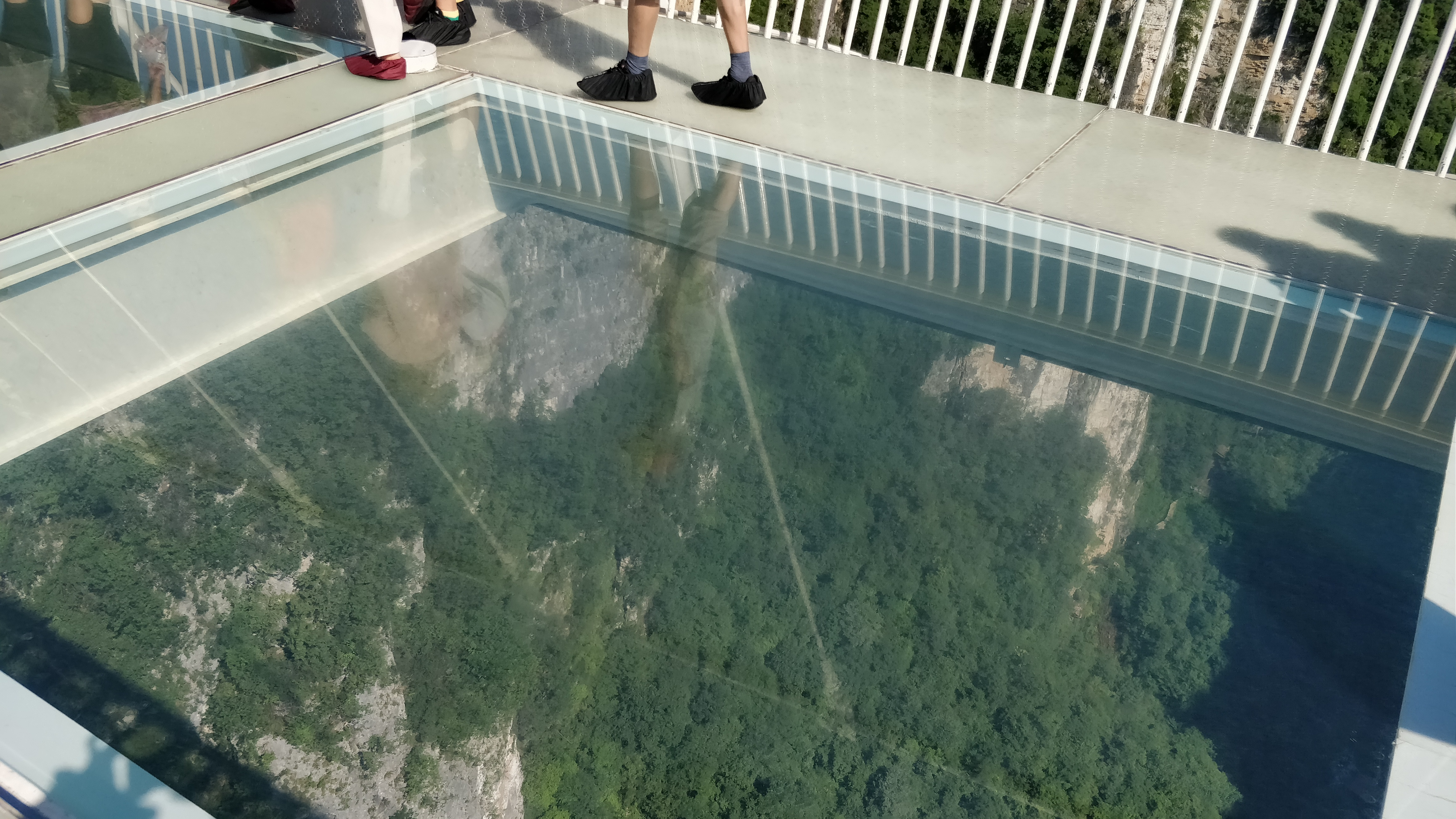
Glass panel

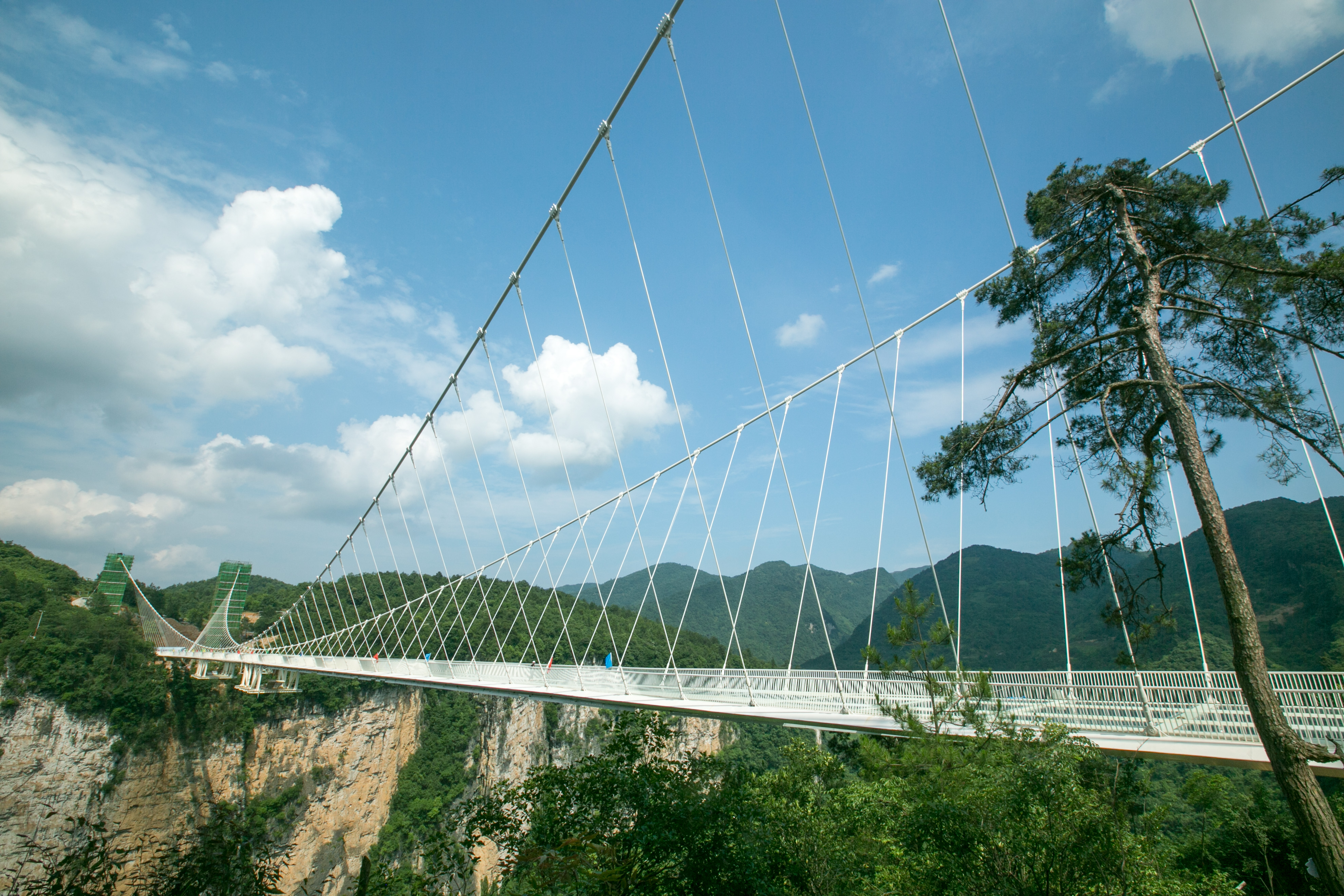
Side view

== See also ==
- East Taihang Glasswalk
