= 310W =

Office building in Milwaukee, Wisconsin

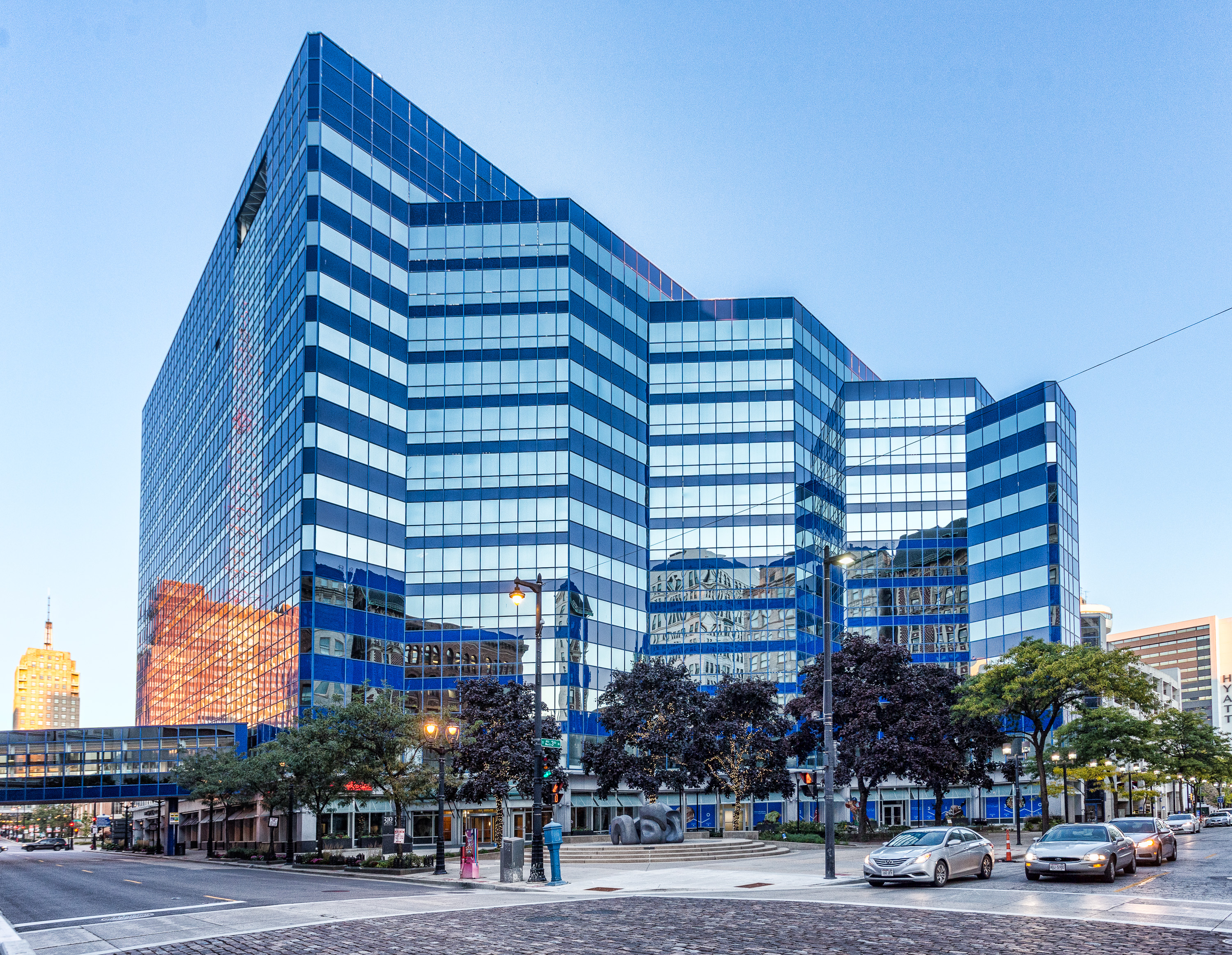
- Former names: Henry S. Reuss Federal Plaza, The Blue

General information
- Architectural style: Modern
- Location: Milwaukee, Wisconsin
- Address: 310 West Wisconsin Avenue
- Coordinates: 43.039266°N 87.915246°W
- Completed: 1983
- Owner: Time Equities Inc.

Technical details
- Floor count: 14
- Floor area: >600,000 square feet (56,000 m^{2})

Design and construction
- Architect(s): Voy Madeyski
- Architecture firm: Perkins and will
- Developer: Carley Capital Group

Website
- https://the310w.com/

310W is a 14-story office building in Milwaukee, Wisconsin. The cobalt blue building is the third largest multi-tenant office building in Wisconsin with a leasable area of over 600,000 square feet (56,000 m^{2}). It consists of two wings connected by an atrium, and is connected to the Milwaukee skywalk system.

== History ==
In the late 1970s, the US federal government needed more office space in Milwaukee, so planning began on the construction of a new building to house federal offices. In September 1980, the Carley Capital Group was chosen to be the developers of the project. Several buildings were demolished to make space for the new offices. In 1983, the building opened as the "Henry S. Reuss Federal Plaza", named after Wisconsin representative Henry S. Reuss, who was involved in the initiation and realization of the project. The building was designed by Voy Madeyski of the Chicago based firm Perkins and will.

Initially, the West wing was leased to federal agencies while the East wing was leased to private offices. However, after the 9/11 attacks in 2001, most of the government tenants relocated due to the building not meeting updated security requirements. The building was renamed "The Blue" in an attempt to attract new tenants. In December 2017, the building was bought for $19.5 million by Time Equities Inc. as part of a $30 million plan to renovate the property. During the renovations, the building was renamed to "310W" in reference to its address. In 2019, the building was only about 36% occupied.
