= Larry Kirkland =

- Born: 1950 (age 75–76)
- Known for: Abstract sculptures
- Website: larrykirkland.com

Larry Kirkland (born 1950) is an abstract sculptor whose installations are found in civic and corporate plazas in many states throughout the United States.

== Selected works ==
- Capitalism (1991), Lloyd Center, Portland, Oregon
- Garden Wreath (1997), Central Library, Portland, Oregon
- Oregon Weathervanes (2002), Portland International Airport, Oregon
- Solar Wreath (1997), Central Library, Portland, Oregon
- Kirkland, Larry (2010). Natural Histories: Public Art by Larry Kirkland. Nancy Princenthal, Carolyn Horwitz, Anthony Iannacci. Los Angeles, Calif.: Architecture Interiors Press, Incorporated. ISBN 978-0-9823190-2-4. OCLC 317929575.
