= Joe Brown's Carmel Corn =

Caramel corn shop in Portland, Oregon, U.S.

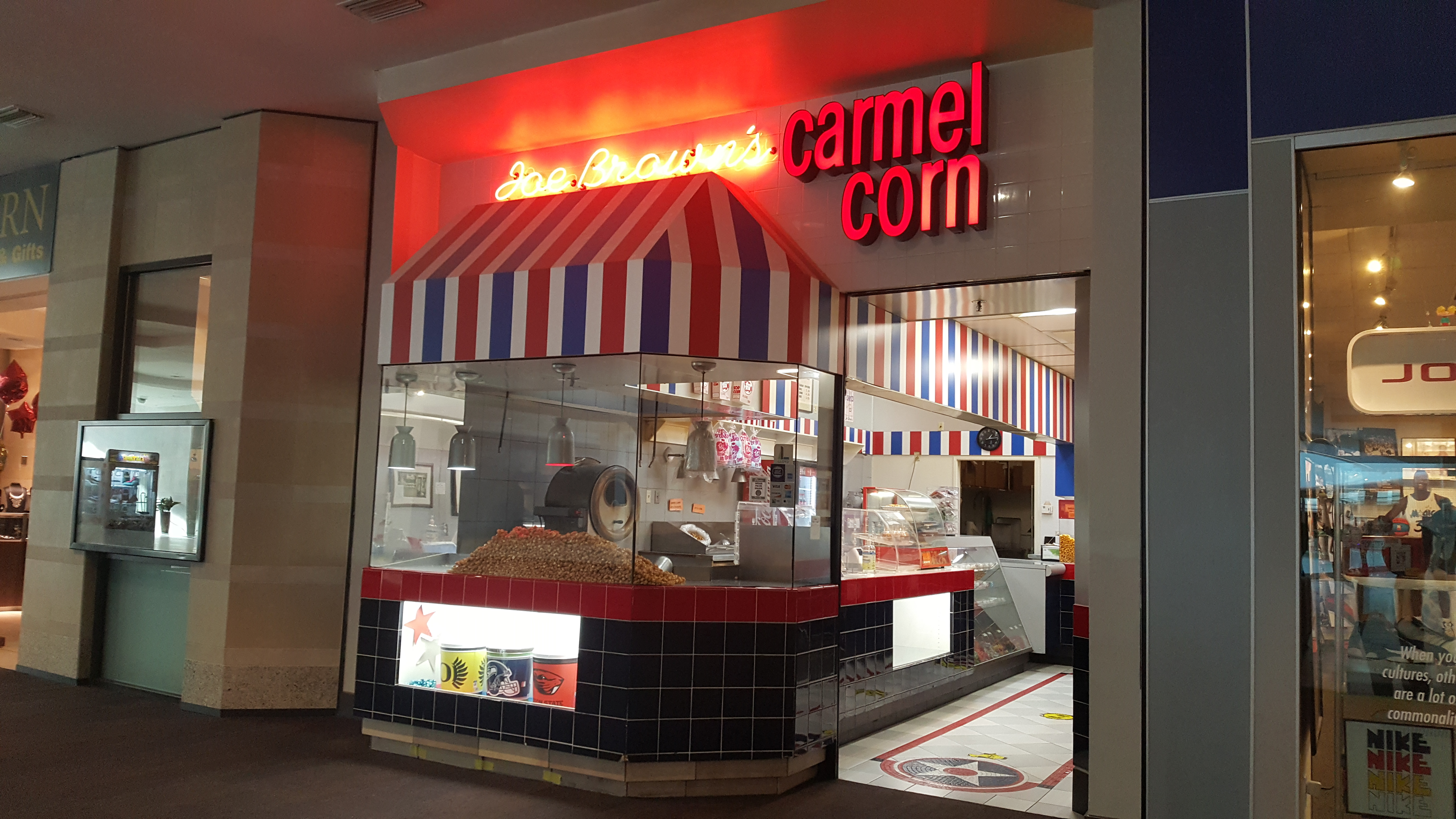
- The Lloyd Center shop in 2022
- Interactive map of Joe Brown's Carmel Corn

Restaurant information
- Established: 1932
- Owner: David Ferguson (2019–present)
- Previous owners: Brown family (1932–1992); Ron Ertler and Diana Ray; Marc and Ratha Chouinard; Cyndee Kurahara
- Location: Portland, Multnomah, Oregon, United States
- Coordinates: 45°31′57.3″N 122°39′15.6″W
- Website: joebrownscarmelcorn.com

Joe Brown's Carmel Corn is a caramel corn business based in Portland, Oregon, United States. The business was established in 1932 by George Brown and his son Joe, originally operating as a single store in downtown. The Brown family expanded the company by opening two additional stores in the city and another in Seaside by the start of World War II. The war halted production and stores remained closed until 1960, when George's daughter Betty Brown and her husband Gordon Kalk opened a single store in the newly built Lloyd Center, in the Lloyd District. Their son, Lee, owned Joe Brown's from c. 1980 to 1992. Subsequent owners have included siblings Ron Ertler and Diana Ray, Marc and Ratha Chouinard, and Cyndee Kurahara. The current owner, David Ferguson, acquired Joe Brown's in 2019.

Over the years, the shops have made a variety of treats, including candy and caramel apples, fudge, peppermint bark, and multiple varieties of popcorn. Joe Brown's caramel corn recipe, mostly unchanged since inception, has received a positive public reception.

== Description and history ==
=== Brown family (1932–1940; 1960–1992) ===
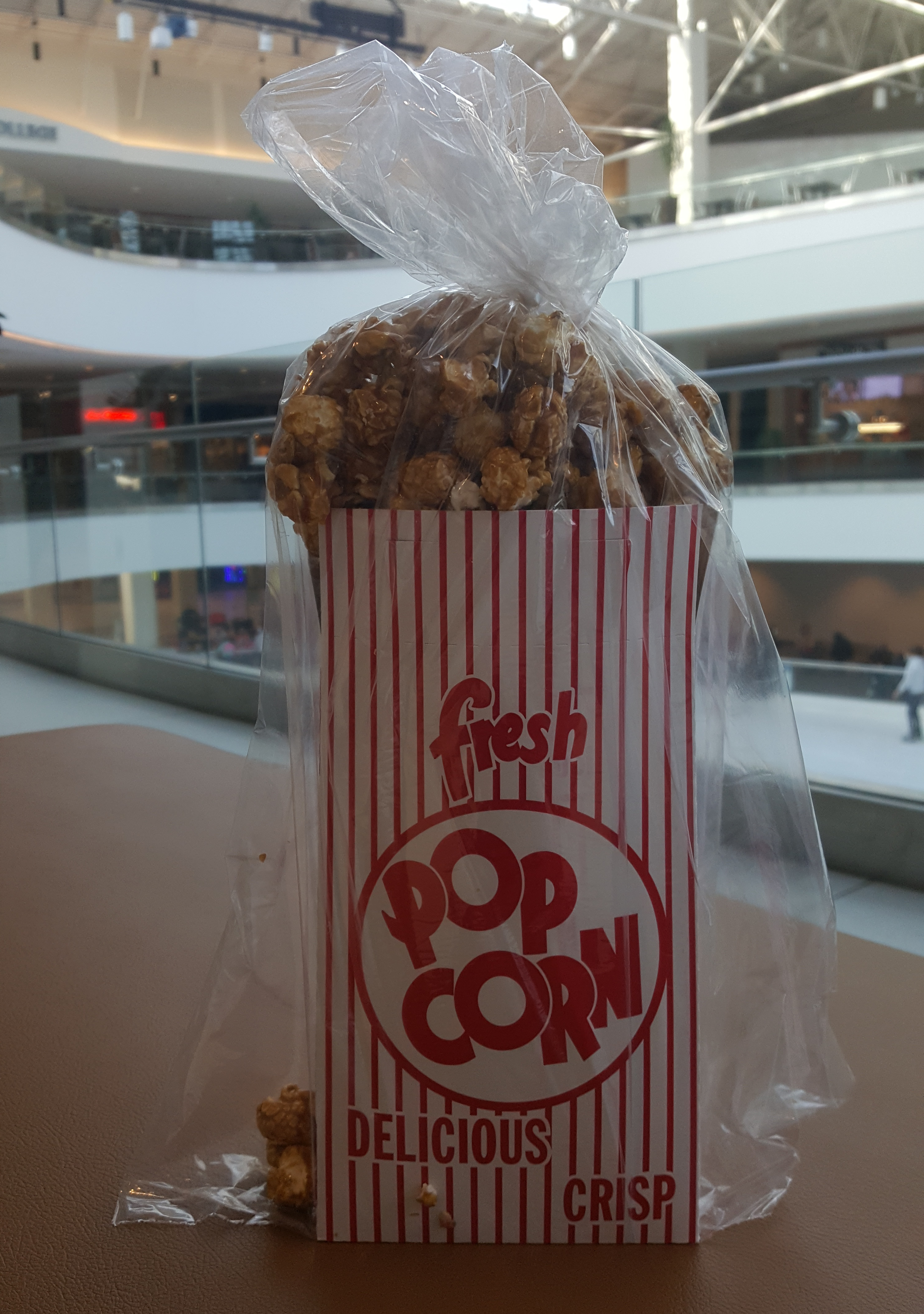
Bag of caramel corn

George Brown and his son Joe, the business' namesake, founded Joe Brown's Carmel Corn in 1932, after relocating from Nebraska. The business originally operated near the Paramount Theater (now known as the Arlene Schnitzer Concert Hall) in downtown Portland. The Brown family expanded the business by opening a store on Southwest Washington Street, another in northeast Portland's Hollywood neighborhood, and a location in Seaside. George made caramel corn in large copper kettles in the basement of the family's Laurelhurst home. The family "also sold 15-cent bags of caramel corn and popcorn at golf tournaments and dog races". The stores operated until World War II, when production was halted.

George's daughter Betty Ann Brown was working at Joe Brown's in 1938 when she met Gordon Kalk; the two married in 1940. Her parents retired soon after, and the stores did not operate for approximately 20 years while Betty worked as a homemaker and raised two children. In 1960, she and Kalk opened a single store in the newly constructed Lloyd Center, which continued to operate as the mall's last remaining original store.

Betty worked at the store often, sometimes seven days a week, alongside other family members. After her son Lee purchased the business c. 1980, she continued to make candy and caramel apples, caramel and cheese popcorn, peanut butter fudge (from peanut butter and Ghirardelli white chocolate), and peppermint bark (with peppermint candy and flavoring, red food coloring, and white chocolate). She worked into her mid-70s, until Lee sold the company in 1992.

=== Subsequent history ===
Ron Ertler and Diana Ray purchased Joe Brown's in November 1998. The siblings opened a small manufacturing plant on Northeast Halsey Street in Gresham for wholesale operations to amusement parks, grocery stores, movie theaters, and zoos. Wholesale production began in March 1999. Food 4 Less was among the independent grocers carrying Joe Brown's products.

As of 2003–2006, Joe Brown's had a shop on Southwest Sixth Avenue in downtown Portland's Transit Mall, in addition to the Lloyd Center location. Joe Brown's sold six varieties of popcorn, including kettle corn and white cheddar cheese, as of 2003. Marc and Ratha Chouinard were the owners as of 2006.

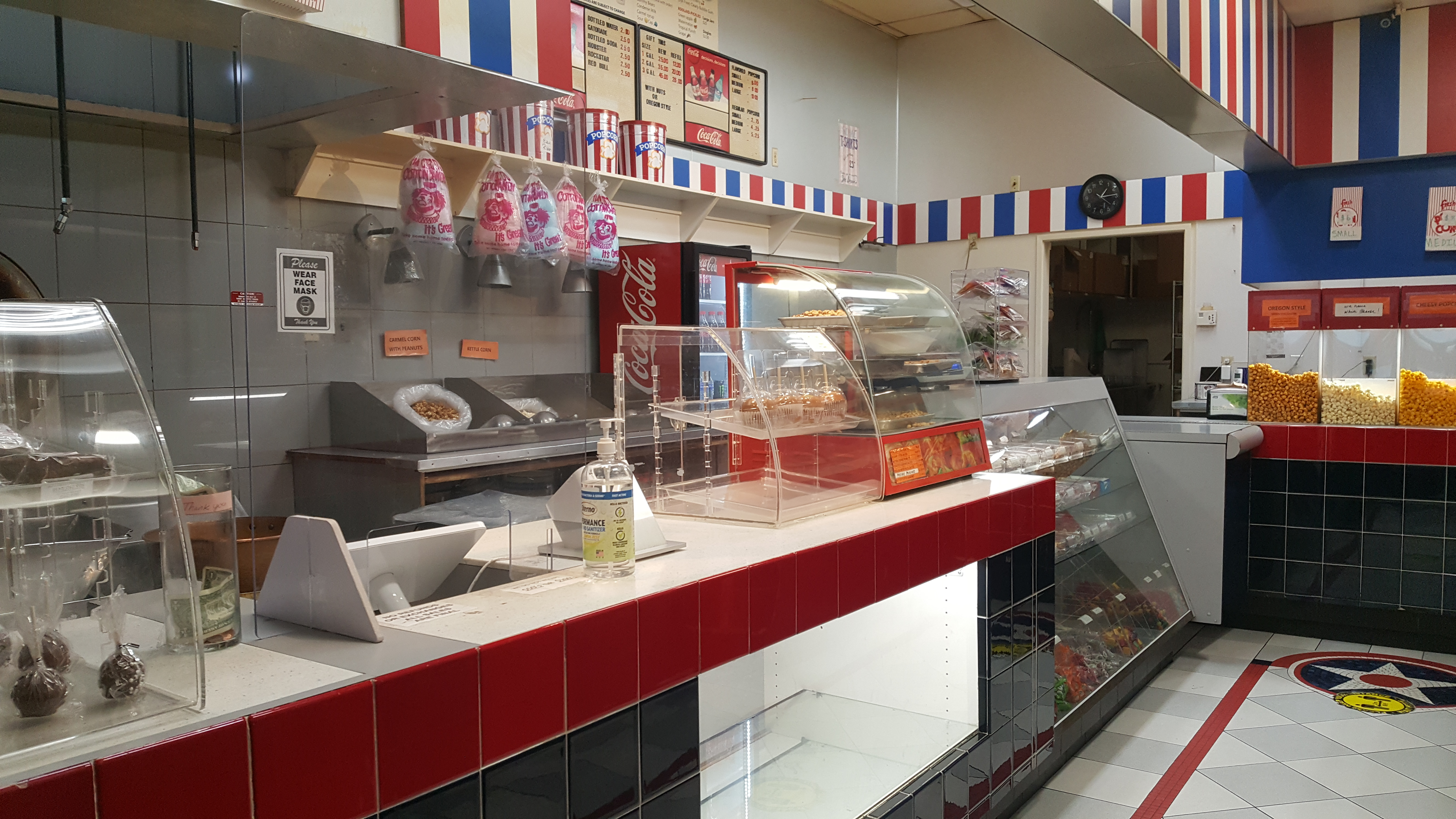
The Lloyd Center shop, 2022

In 2010, there were four Joe Brown's shops and an online store. Portland native Cyndee Kurahara had owned the business for approximately five years as of December 2015. The shop served caramel apples, three varieties of popcorn, and other sweets such as Icees, licorice, mint truffles, and Swedish Fish at the time. The caramel corn recipe has remained mostly unchanged since the business was founded, as of 2019. Joe Brown's had an estimated 200–300 daily customers at Lloyd Center at the time, and also supplied products to Enchanted Forest, an amusement park in Turner near Salem, and to the Portland International Airport.

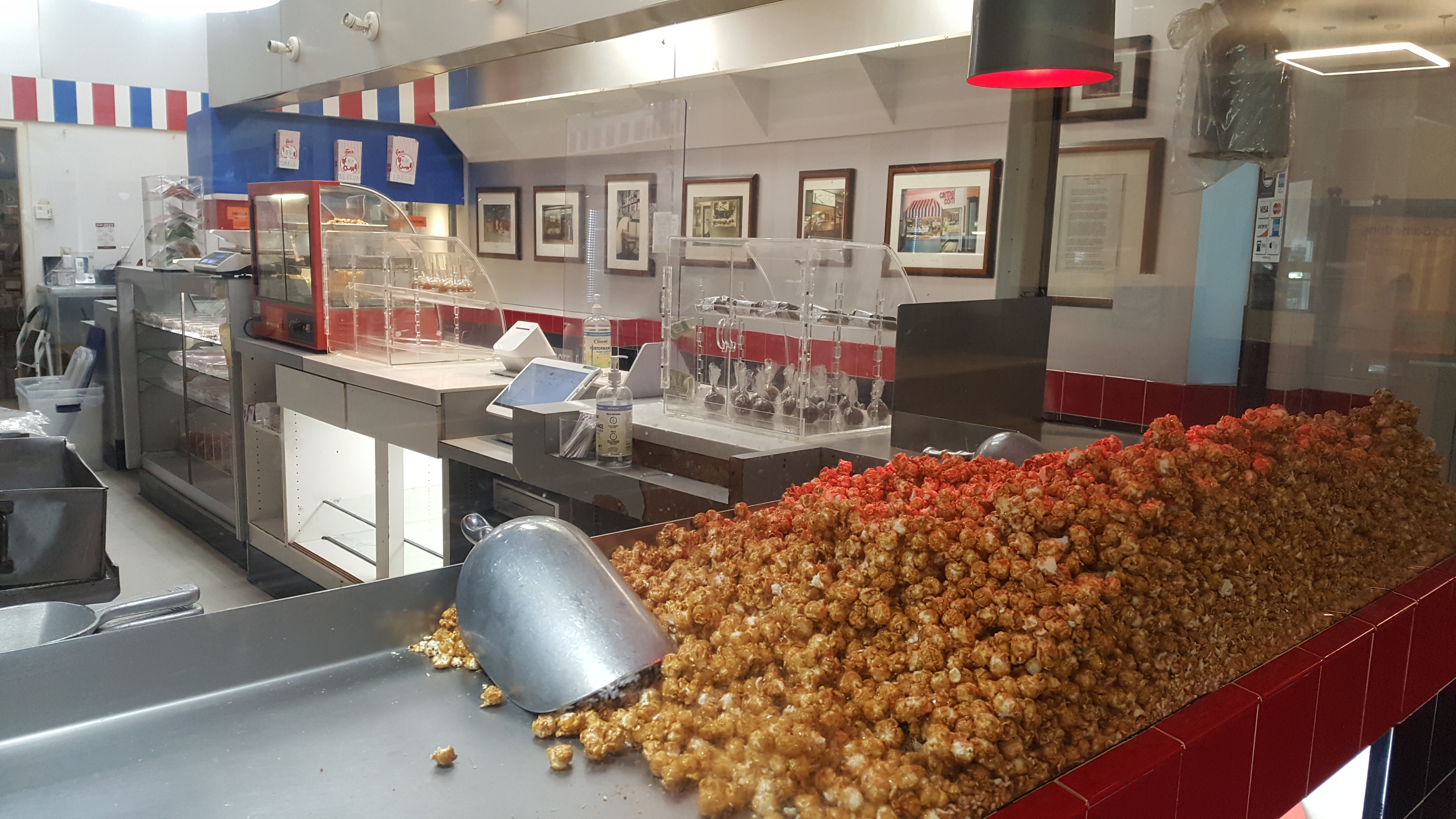
Caramel corn

Current owner David Ferguson purchased the business in 2019. In March 2020, during the COVID-19 pandemic, Joe Brown's hosted Feed the Family, purchasing for families 60–75 meals from various restaurants each day for a week. The pandemic forced the Lloyd Center to close temporarily. Joe Brown's had been partnering with Hana's PDX, a New Orleans-style snowball cart, prior to the closures. The Black-owned business continues to sell popcorn online.

In December 2022, plans to open a second location at the former Geneva's Shear Perfection were announced. Located on Martin Luther King Jr. Boulevard in northeast Portland's King neighborhood, the shop was slated to open on January 1, 2023. Joe Brown's Carmel Corn shared the building with Joe Brown's Lounge, a 30-seat bar that "[eschewed] the carnivalesque vibe of its neighbor in favor of a concise, new-jack-swing energy and '90s black-and-white minimalism", according to Willamette Week. The bar's menu included Asian fusion cuisine, Cajun seafood, and soul food.

Joe Brown's Carmel Corn operated in the Lloyd Center until its closure in August 2026.

== Reception ==
In 2005, Amy Martinez Starke of The Oregonian said of Joe Brown's under the operation of Betty Brown and Kalk:

Their great draw was the signature caramel corn (which never had nuts in it) you could smell clear out in the parking lot; customers' noses took them right in there. People would walk right past, and two seconds later they would make a U-turn into the store. It was a gold mine. They had a good location, in the west end, just above the ice rink. From Thanksgiving through Christmas, customers lined up clear to the typewriter store, two stores away, and sometimes farther than that.

After Betty Brown died in 2005, Starke wrote, "She was 88, but to several generations of Portlanders, the aroma of her family's fresh caramel corn remains eternal." In 2015, Matthew Korfhage of Willamette Week said:

The caramel is rich and thick and sweet and beautifully crisp, but also a bit variable—in the way of all things homestyle—one kernel a little browner and crisper than the other. Weirdos and Midwesterners go for the Chicago corn—caramel and butter mixed together—but the masterpiece at Joe Brown's is the near-perfect kettle corn. It comes salty and just barely crisped, with little pockets of sugary sweetness.

In 2016, the newspaper's Enid Spitz and the Portland Mercury's Morgan Troper called Joe Brown's a "must-visit" and "a Portland staple", respectively.

== See also ==
- List of Black-owned restaurants
