= Solar Wreath =

Sculpture at the Central Library, Portland, Oregon

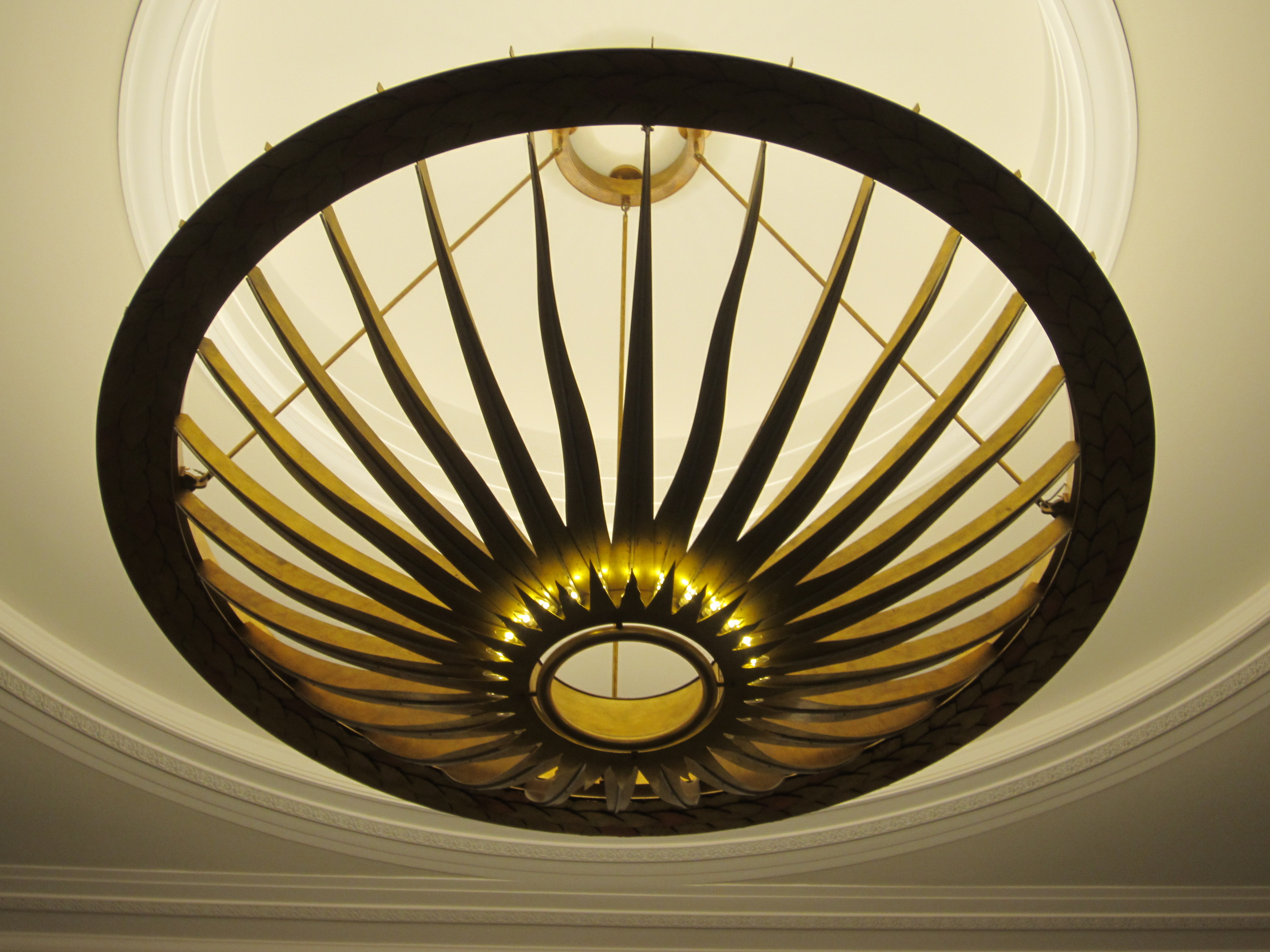
- The sculpture in 2012
- Artist: Larry Kirkland
- Year: 1997
- Type: Sculpture
- Medium: Aluminum, brass or gold leaf
- Subject: Wreath
- Location: Portland, Oregon, United States
- Owner: City of Portland and Multnomah County Public Art Collection courtesy of the Regional Arts & Culture Council

Solar Wreath is a 1997 sculpture by American artist Larry Kirkland, located on the third floor of the Central Library in Portland, Oregon. Funded by public and private donations funneled through the advocate and support group Friends of the Multnomah County Library, the abstract suspended gilded ring measures 9 feet, 4 inches x 12 feet and is made of aluminum and brass or gold leaf.

According to the Regional Arts & Culture Council, which administers the work, Solar Wreath is part of the artist's "Garden of Knowledge" series, which also includes Garden Stair and Garden Wreath (1997). These three works relate "in form, materials and metaphor", illustrating Kirkland's belief that the library is "a place where people explore, uncover and learn". They were installed before the library building's re-opening in April 1997 after being closed for renovation for more than two years.

Solar Wreath is part of the City of Portland and Multnomah County Public Art Collection courtesy of the Regional Arts & Culture Council.

== See also ==
- 1997 in art
