= Capitalism (sculpture) =

Sculpture in Portland, Oregon, U.S.

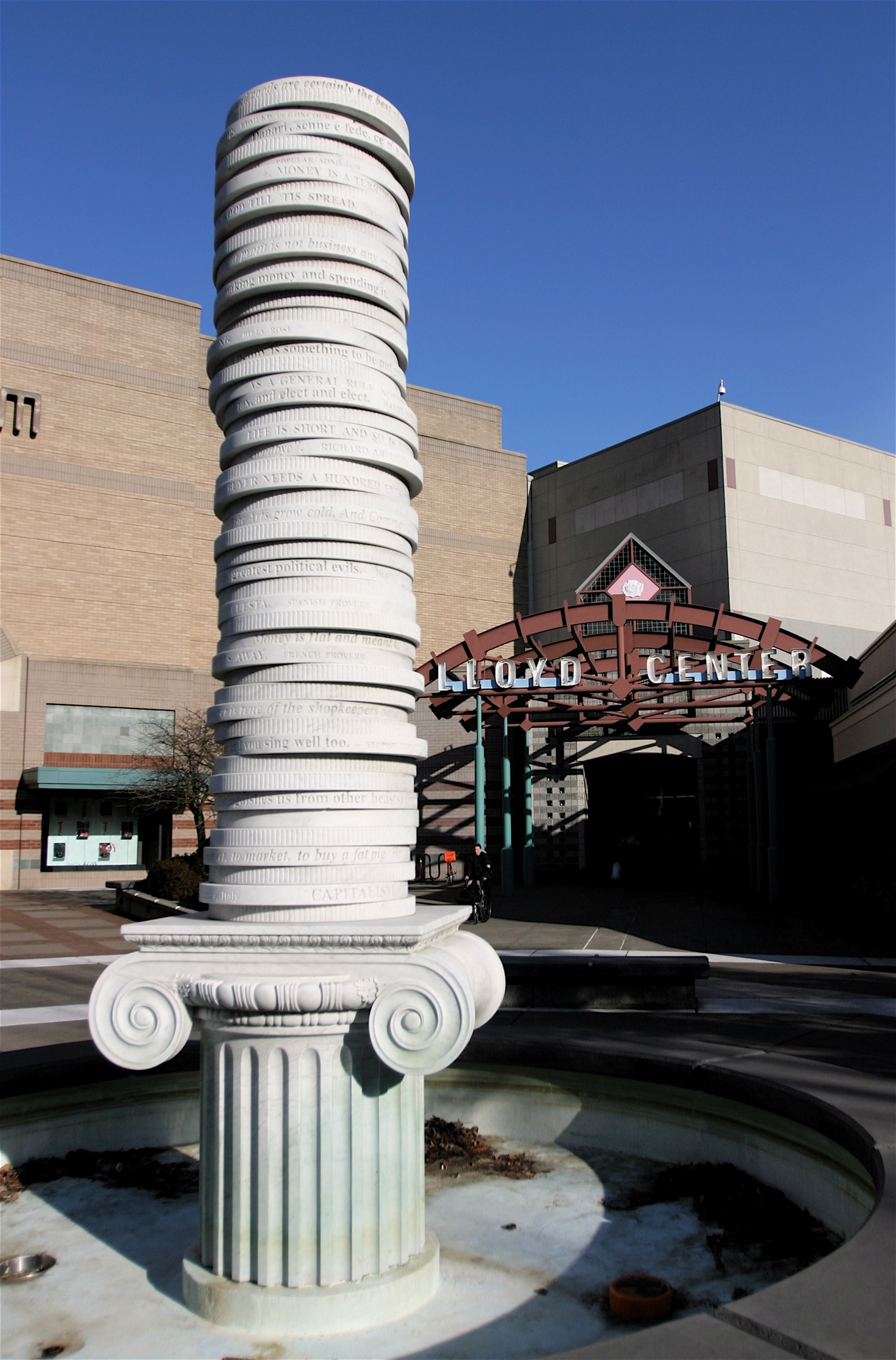
- The sculpture in 2006
- Artist: Larry Kirkland
- Year: 1991
- Type: Fountain; sculpture
- Medium: Concrete; marble
- Dimensions: 4.9 m (16 ft)
- Condition: "Treatment needed" (1993)
- Location: Portland, Oregon, United States; 45°31′54″N 122°39′22″W

Capitalism is a 1991 outdoor marble and concrete sculpture and fountain by Larry Kirkland, located in northeast Portland, Oregon, United States.

== Description ==
Larry Kirkland's Capitalism (1991) is an outdoor marble and concrete sculpture and fountain installed at the corner of Northeast 9th Avenue and Northeast Multnomah Street by the Lloyd Center. It was chosen in a regional art competition during Lloyd Center's renovation. The sculpture depicts fifty coins stacked on an Ionic column and is set in the center of a circular fountain basin with four water jets. Half of the coins have serious or humorous inscriptions on their edges relating to capitalism and commerce.

The allegorical sculpture measures 16 feet (4.9 m) tall and the basin's diameter is approximately 20 feet (6.1 m). It was surveyed and considered "treatment needed" by the Smithsonian Institution's "Save Outdoor Sculpture!" program in July 1993. It has been included in published walking tours and public art guides, one of which called the sculpture "an appropriate reminder of the relationship of money to a marketplace".

== See also ==
- 1991 in art
- Fountains in Portland, Oregon
