= Garden Wreath =

Sculpture at the Central Library, Portland, Oregon, U.S.

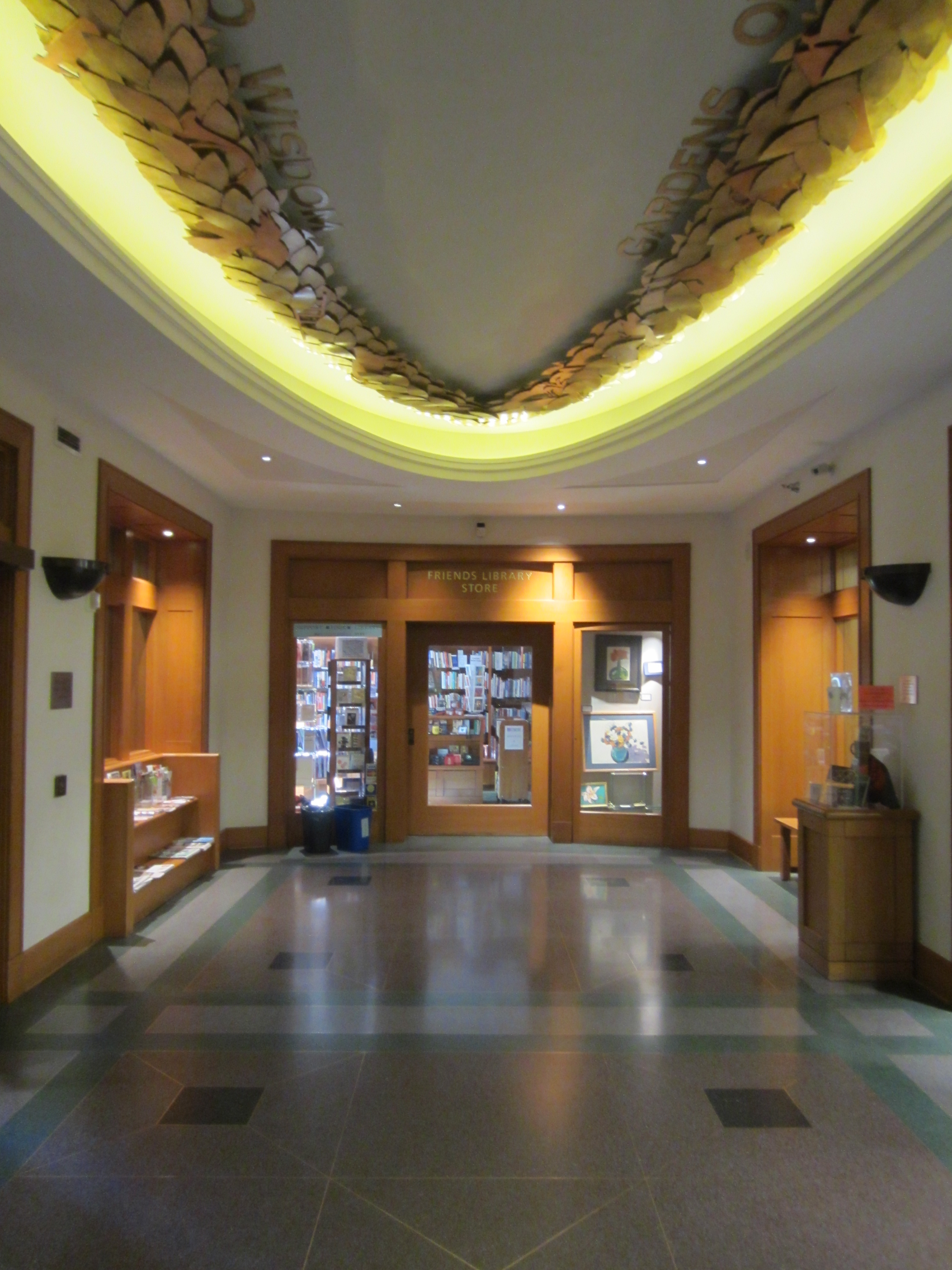
- The sculpture suspended in the Central Library's entry foyer in 2012
- Artist: Larry Kirkland
- Year: 1997
- Type: Sculpture
- Medium: Aluminum, brass leaf
- Location: Portland, Oregon, United States
- Owner: City of Portland and Multnomah County Public Art Collection courtesy of the Regional Arts & Culture Council

Garden Wreath is a 1997 sculpture by American artist Larry Kirkland, located in the entry foyer of the Central Library in Portland, Oregon.

== Description and history ==
Funded by Multnomah County's Percent for Art program, the suspended ellipse sculpture measures 10.5 feet (3.2 m) x 31 feet (9.4 m) and is made of gilded and coppered aluminum leaves. It displays images and text, and introduces the artist's "Garden of Knowledge" series, which also includes Garden Stair and Solar Wreath (1997). According to the Regional Arts & Culture Council, these three works relate "in form, materials and metaphor", illustrating Kirkland's belief that the library is "a place where people explore, uncover and learn". The work is part of the City of Portland and Multnomah County Public Art Collection courtesy of the Regional Arts & Culture Council.

== See also ==
- 1997 in art
