= Nancy Princenthal =

Art historian and author

- Born: December 21, 1955 (age 70)
- Occupations: art historian, writer

Nancy Princenthal (born 21 December 1955) is an American art historian, writer, and author. She is based in Brooklyn, New York.

== Biography ==
Princenthal has contributed to a number of magazines including The New York Times, Artforum, and Parkett. She has been one of the Senior Editors of Art in America. She won the 2016 PEN America award for her biography of Agnes Martin. Princenthal has written about Shirin Neshat, Doris Salcedo, Robert Mangold and Alfredo Jaar and others.

Princenthal has worked at the Center for Curatorial Studies, Bard College; Princeton University; Yale University; and the School of Visual Arts.

== Bibliography ==
- Bourdon, David; Princenthal, Nancy; Ferrara, Jackie; Sheppard-Gallagher, Ileen (1992). Jackie Ferrara Sculpture: A Retrospective. Rose Art Museum, Indianapolis Museum of Art. John and Mable Ringling Museum of Art. ISBN 9780916758332.
- Princenthal, Nancy; Earenfight, Phillip; Kozloff, Joyce (2008). Joyce Kozloff: Co+ordinates. Carlisle, PA: The Trout Gallery-Dickinson. ISBN 9780976848882.
- Princenthal, Nancy (2010). Hannah Wilke. Munich, Germany: Prestel.
- Heartney, Eleanor; Posner, Helaine; Princenthal, Nancy; Scott, Sue A. (2013). The Reckoning: Women Artists of the New Millennium. Munich, Germany: Prestel. ISBN 9783791347592.
- Heartney, Eleanor; Posner, Helaine; Princenthal, Nancy; Scott, Sue A. (2013). After the Revolution: Women Who Transformed Contemporary Art. Munich, Germany: Prestel Verlag. ISBN 9783641108212.
- Princenthal, Nancy (2015). Agnes Martin: Her Life and Art. London, United Kingdom: Thames and Hudson Limited. ISBN 9780500772874.
- Moyer, Carrie; Princenthal, Nancy (2016). Louise Fishman. University of Pennsylvania, Neuberger Museum of Art. Neuberger Museum of Art. ISBN 9783791355177.
- Princenthal, Nancy (2019). Unspeakable Acts: Women, Art, and Sexual Violence in the 1970s. London, United Kingdom: Thames and Hudson. ISBN 9780500023051.
- Kirkland, Larry (2010). Natural histories : public art by Larry Kirkland. Nancy Princenthal, Carolyn Horwitz, Anthony Iannacci. Los Angeles, Calif. ISBN 978-0-9823190-2-4. OCLC 317929575.
