= Stoopid Burger =

Restaurant in Portland, Oregon, U.S.

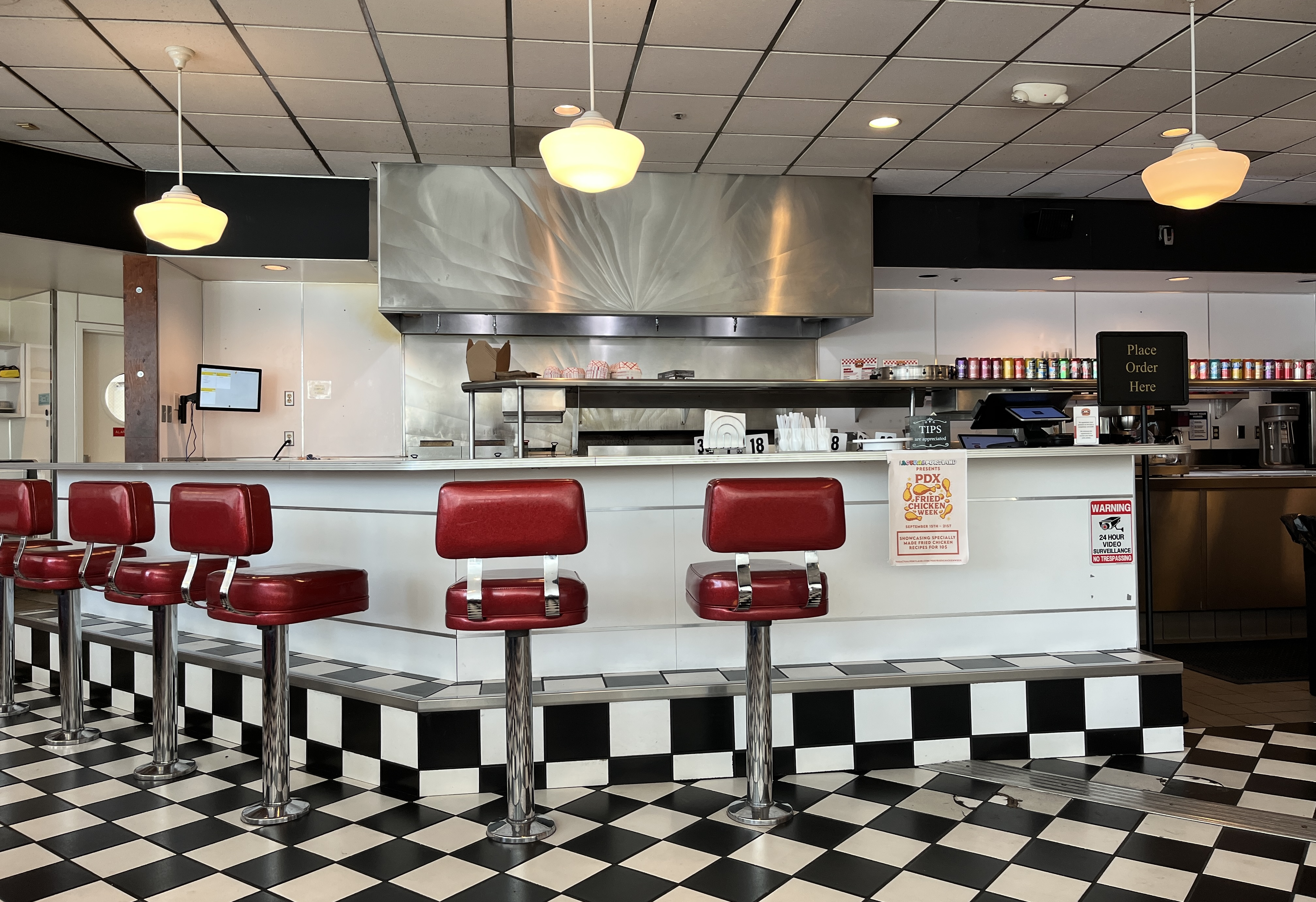
- Interior of the restaurant at the Lloyd Center, 2025
- Interactive map of Stoopid Burger

Restaurant information
- Established: 2014
- Location: Portland, Multnomah, Oregon, United States
- Coordinates: 45.5325°N 122.6540°W
- Website: stoopidburger.net

Stoopid Burger is a restaurant in Portland, Oregon, United States. The business started as a food cart in 2014. It operated in a brick and mortar space from 2017 to 2020. Following a closure, Stoopid Burger re-opened in the Lloyd Center in the city's Lloyd District in 2025.

== Description ==
The restaurant Stoopid Burger, originally a food cart, later operated in the Lloyd Center, a shopping mall in the northeast Portland of the Lloyd District. The menu includes hamburgers, onion rings, shrimp po'boys, and a purple-colored drink called Stoopid Juice. The Stoopid Burger has beef patties, bacon, ham, a hot link, cheddar cheese, and an egg. The Ignorant Burger has three patties, steak, bacon, a hot link, ham, chutney, blue and cheddar cheese, an egg, mushrooms, grilled onions, and jalapeños. The Smart Burger is a veggie burger. The Wicked Burger has peanut butter and a chutney made from habanero, mango, and pineapple. The restaurant has also served chicken tenders, fish and chips, mozzarella sticks, hot dogs, and desserts. It uses its signature "Stoopid sauce".

== History ==
Stoopid Burger was co-owned by John Hunt and Danny Moore. The business launched as a food cart in 2014, operating on North Vancouver. Stoopid Burger began operating in a brick and mortar space in 2017.

The Daily Meal said the Ignorant Burger was the "most outrageous restaurant dish" in a 2018 list of the "best food and drink in Oregon for 2019" and included the burger in a 2019 overview of the nation's most expensive burgers. Stoopid Burger was among several restaurants used as filming locations for the 2019 music video for "Adobo" by Swiggle Mandela.

In January 2020, the owners announced plans to part ways and close in February. The restaurant closed on February 2; Willamette Week called the closure "sudden" and "surprising". In early 2025, Moore re-opened Stoopid Burger in the Lloyd Center, in the space previously occupied by the diner Billy Heartbeats.

Michael Symon visited Stoopid Burger for an episode (season 4, episode 18) of the Food Network series Burgers, Brew & 'Que.

== Reception ==
Stoopid Burger was included in Thrillist's 2016 list of Portland's eleven best burgers. The business won the People's Choice vote for the city's best burger in The Oregonian's readers' poll in 2016. In 2020, the newspaper's Michael Russell called Stoopid Burger "beloved" and "one of the best-known black-owned food businesses" in Portland. The restaurant's Stoopid Burger was included in a 2017 list of the city's sixteen best "classic" burgers. Meghan McCarron of Eater said the business was "one of the city's most prominent black-owned restaurants" in 2019.

== See also ==
- List of Black-owned restaurants
- List of hamburger restaurants
