= Lloyd Center =

Defunct mall in Portland, Oregon, U.S.

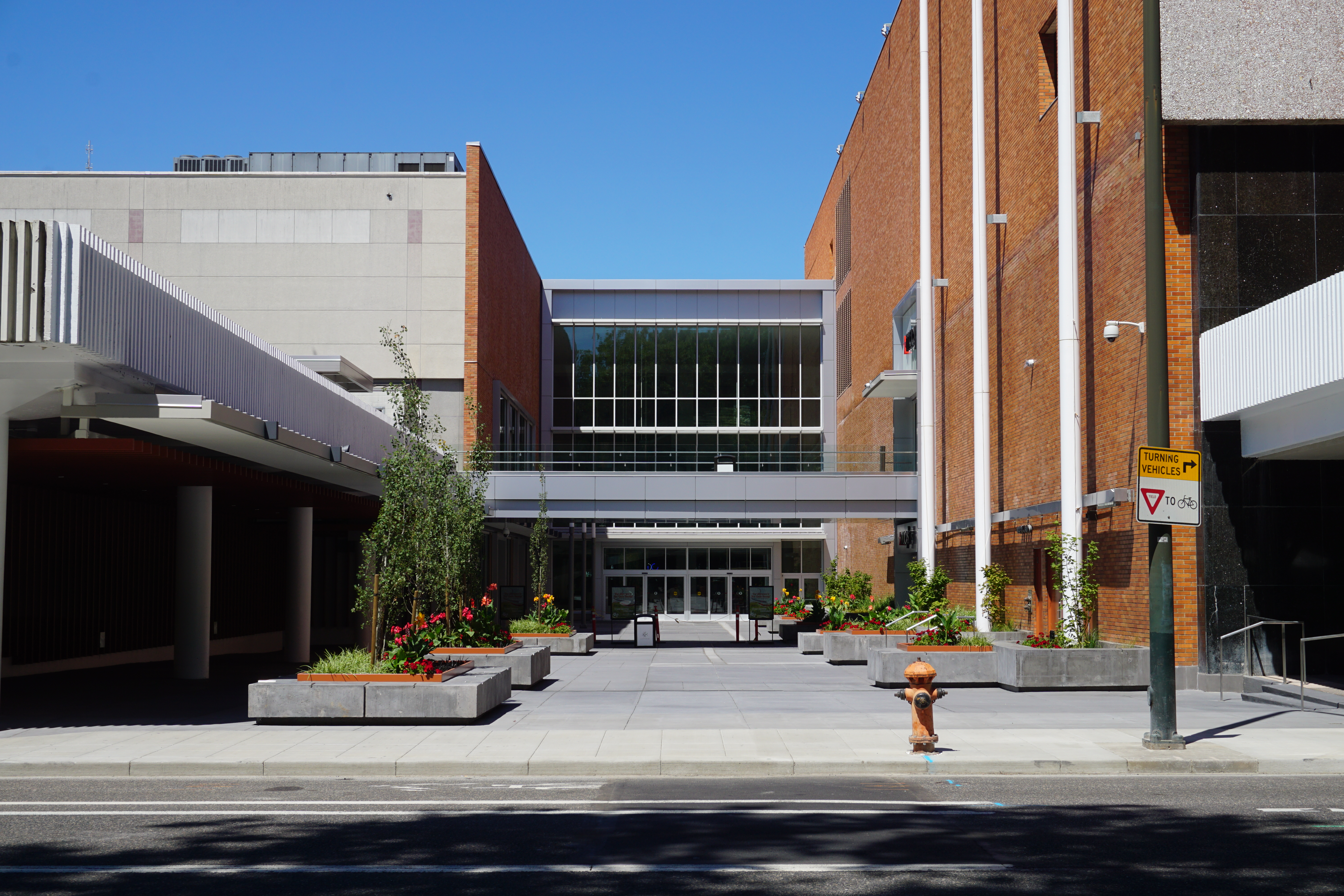
- Main entrance after the 2017 renovation
- Location: Portland, Oregon, United States
- Coordinates: 45.5325°N 122.6536°W
- Opened: August 1, 1960; 66 years ago
- Closed: August 8, 2026; 3 months ago
- Developer: Lloyd Family and Prudential Insurance
- Manager: Urban Renaissance Group
- Owner: KKR Real Estate Finance Trust Inc. and Urban Renaissance Group
- Num. of stores: 40+
- Num. of anchor tenants: 4 (all vacant)
- Floor area: 1,472,000 sq ft (136,800 m^{2}) (as of 2007)
- Floors: 3 (2 in former Marshalls, 4 later 3 in former Sears, 5 in former Macy's)
- Parking: 3 garages
- Public transit: MAX Light Rail at Lloyd Center/NE 11th Bus Service; 8, 17, 70, 77
- Website: lloydcenter.com

Lloyd Center is a defunct mall located in the Lloyd District of Portland, Oregon, United States, northeast of downtown Portland, across the Willamette River. Opened in 1960, it was initially said to have been the largest shopping mall in the world, or at least the Pacific Northwest.

The mall featured three floors of shopping, with the third level serving mostly as professional office spaces, a food court, and U.S. Education Corporation's Carrington College. Lloyd Center also included the Lloyd Center Ice Skating Rink, which became the main draw for the mall, and an 8,000 space parking garage. The mall closed permanently on August 8, 2026.

== History ==
=== Background ===
Ideas for Lloyd Center were conceived as early as 1905. The mall was named after southern Californian oil company executive Ralph B. Lloyd (1875–1953), who aspired to build "a different kind of shopping center" on the land in NE Portland. By the time of his death in 1953, at age 78, he owned over 100 city blocks and had already finalized plans for his new shopping center. The mall opened in 1960, seven year's after Lloyd's death, under the leadership of Ralph Lloyd's son-in-law, Richard Von Hagen, who was named Lloyd Corp. chief executive. Von Hagen was married to Lloyd's youngest daughter, Lulu Mae, who, in the 1960s, worked closely with Walt Disney to establish the California Institute of the Arts (CalArts). To design the mall, Von Hagen hired architect John Graham, Jr., who had designed Seattle's Northgate Mall years earlier.

=== 1960–1988: Grand opening and initial decades ===
The mall opened August 1, 1960 in a 100-store, open-air configuration. At the time, it was the largest shopping center in the Pacific Northwest and claimed to be the largest in the country. The following month, then-Vice President Richard Nixon spoke to a packed crowd the day before the ice skating rink opened to the public In his speech, he addressed the Cold War competition with the Soviet Union and said, if anyone thinks the United States has "stood still," then "who built the largest shopping center in the world, the Lloyd Center Shopping Center right here?"

Located on the opposite side of the river to downtown, Lloyd Center was the first retail development to compete against downtown shops. The mall was aimed at commuters utilizing Portland's then-growing freeway system, especially the new adjacent Banfield Expressway (with its own "Lloyd Center" exit), which was completed in 1957. As Time magazine reported in 1960, at the time, around 595,000 people lived within a 20-minute drive of Lloyd Center.

The mall's original anchor stores were Meier & Frank at the center, Best's and Nordstrom's Shoes anchoring the west end, J. C. Penney and Woolworth anchoring the east, and J. J. Newberry the north. The Newberry store was the national chain's largest at the time of its opening. Morrow's Nuts was one of the original stores, as was the now defunct department store Foreman & Clark. Before the food court was introduced, there were seven sit-down restaurants at the mall, including Mannings, Pancake Corner, Mr. C's Hippopotamus, Goldberg's Restaurant, and Aladdin Restaurant, which was operated by Meier & Frank.

Just two months after the mall opened, then Crown Princess Michiko and Crown Prince Akihito of Japan visited Lloyd Center on October 5, 1960. The royal couple toured the Meier & Frank department store, alongside Oregon Governor Mark Hatfield and Portland Mayor Terry Shrunk.Their highly publicized itinerary included viewing the open-air ice rink and visiting Naito Gifts, a local Japanese-American business.

Every holiday season, Lloyd Center featured a giant Christmas tree, visits from Santa Claus, nativity displays, and holiday-themed skating events. Storybook Lane, an Alpenrose Dairy Christmas attraction featuring live animals and a miniature town, was originally constructed at Lloyd Center in 1961 before later relocating. The mall’s annual Mrs. Claus tree lighting was an annual occurrence since the building was remodeled in 2016. The mall celebrated its final Christmas in 2025, before closing the following August.

Entertainers routinely performed at the mall in the 1960s and 1970s. Ella Fitzgerald performed at the mall's opening ceremonies in 1960. In 1963, Andy Williams performed at the mall and signed autographs. In 1965, for the mall's fifth birthday celebration, Louis Armstrong, accompanied by Peanuts Hucko and Trummy Young, performed in front of a crowd of nearly 30,000 people.

Magician Chuck Jones performed in the mall's central plaza, and the mall earned an entry in the Guinness Book of Records for largest simultaneous chess tournament. In the mall's early years, a variety of events were held at the mall, including square dancing, clown contests, and carnivals.

In 1968, thousands of people gathered to hear then Senator Robert R. Kennedy talk about why he wanted to be the Democratic nominee for President. It was one of his final public appearances before his assassination in Los Angeles less than two weeks later. The Senator and his wife Ethel skated on the skating rink.

As of 1971, Lloyd Center's five largest stores were, from largest to smallest, Meier & Frank (314,000 sq ft (29,200 m^{2})), Newberry's (100,000 sq ft (9,300 m^{2})), JCPenney (97,370 sq ft (9,046 m^{2})), F. W. Woolworth (62,734 sq ft (5,828.2 m^{2})) and Nordstrom Best (52,891 sq ft (4,913.7 m^{2})).

The first significant expansion to the mall since its opening in 1960 was made in fall 1972, adding six stores. The 75,000-square-foot (7,000 m^{2}) expansion included the addition of a 50,000-square-foot (4,600 m^{2}) Lipman's store. In 1973, JCPenney was remodeled and expanded to 144,000 square feet (13,400 m^{2}).

When Frederick & Nelson acquired the Lipman's chain in 1979, the Lipman's store at Lloyd Center became Frederick & Nelson. Woolworth's closed in September 1982.

=== 1988–2021: Renovations, decline and foreclosure ===
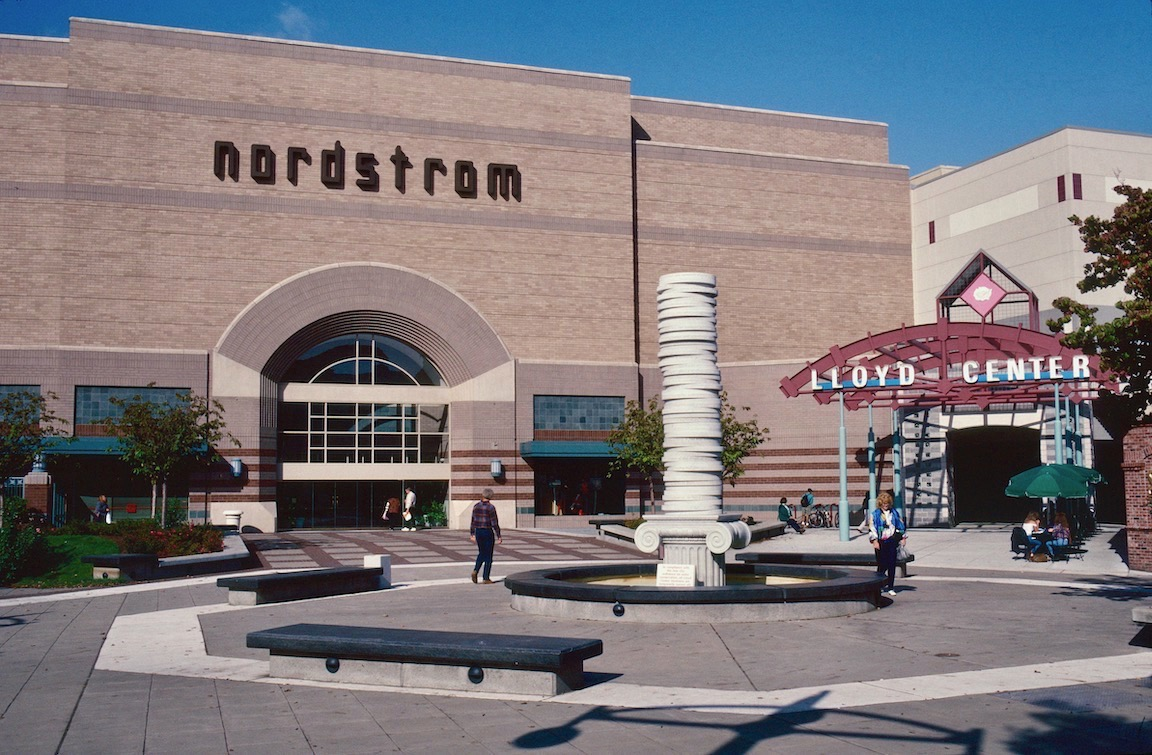
Southwest entrance in 1992, after its remodeling and the replacement of the original Nordstrom store from 1960 with a new, larger one

By 1987, the mall was aging, and enclosed malls were becoming the norm across the United States. The mall, and specifically its huge, predominantly empty parking garages, became magnets for criminal activity. In 1989, the Lloyd Center district reported more than 700 car prowls, about two per day. Between 1988 and 1991, the mall gradually underwent a $200 million mall-wide renovation, which added a glass roof, which fully enclosed the mall, and a food court. The remodeled shopping hub was reopened to the public in August 1991. That same year, the Oregon Symphony performed at the mall.

Glimcher Realty Trust bought the center in 1998 for $167 million. JCPenney closed in June 1998 and was replaced by Sears in November 1999. The Newberry's store, the last in Oregon, closed in 2001, when the entire chain went out of business. Macy's replaced Meier & Frank in 2006.

As the mall started to lose business to internet shopping, crime continued to be a problem, specifically the parking garage, the site of numerous shootings over the years. In 2013, a surge in Portland gang violence heavily affected the Lloyd Center area, prompting stricter security measures and increased law enforcement patrols following multiple public shootouts.

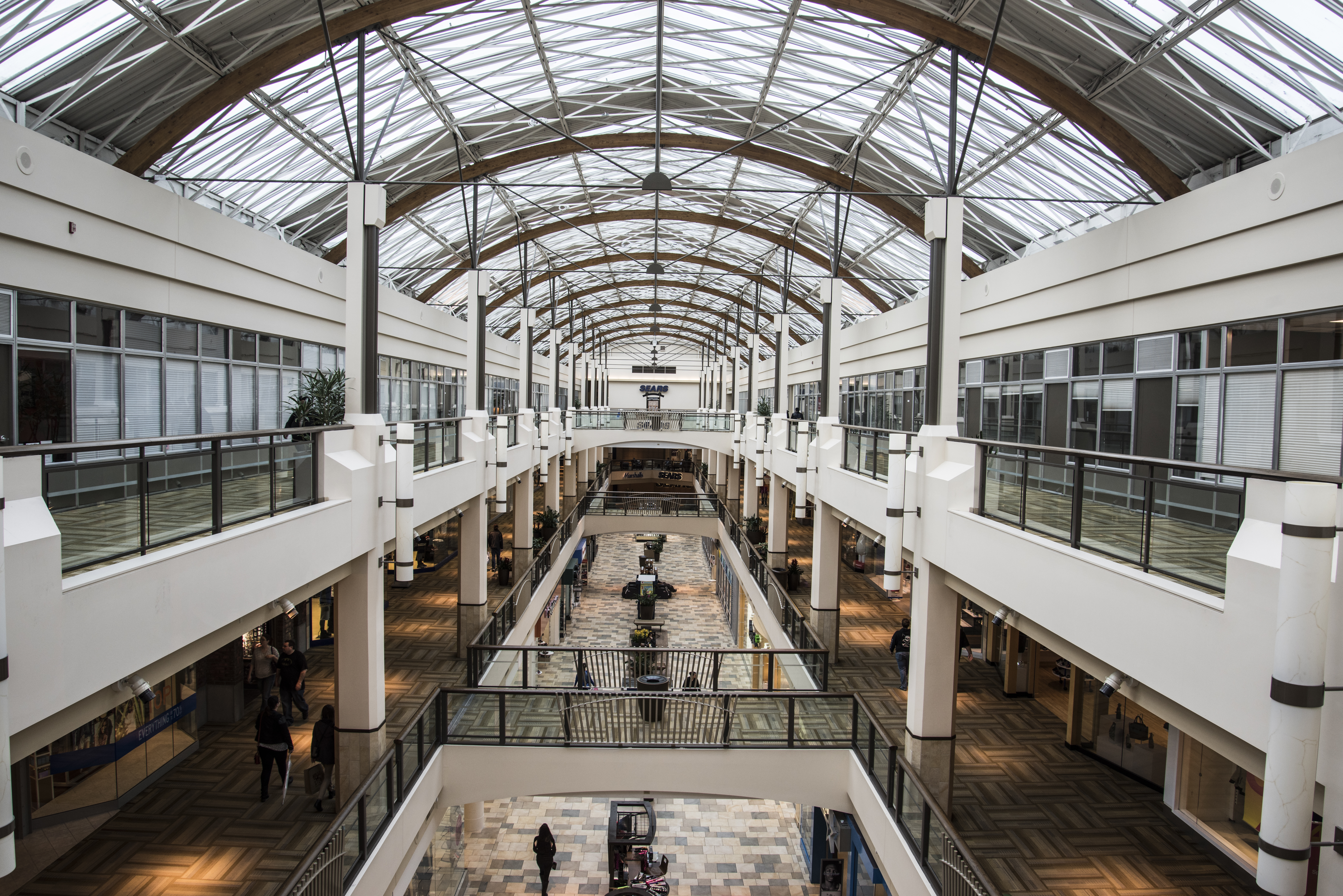
Interior view (February 2015)

Glimcher Realty Trust sold 60% of the center to Blackstone Real Estate Partners in 2010 after a deal to sell the entire mall fell through the year before. Lloyd Center was sold by Glimcher to Cypress Equities Real Estate Investment Management in June 2013.

In February 2014, Nordstrom announced it would be closing its Lloyd Center store effective January 10, 2015. That year, the foster youth nonprofit organization Project Lemonade moved into the mall.

An 18-month, $50 million renovation began in March 2015, alongside the closure of Regal Lloyd Mall 8. Entrances to the mall were made more pedestrian-friendly and the central space was reconfigured with a spiral staircase. The changes were in part a response to the increasing population of the Lloyd District from newly constructed apartment buildings.

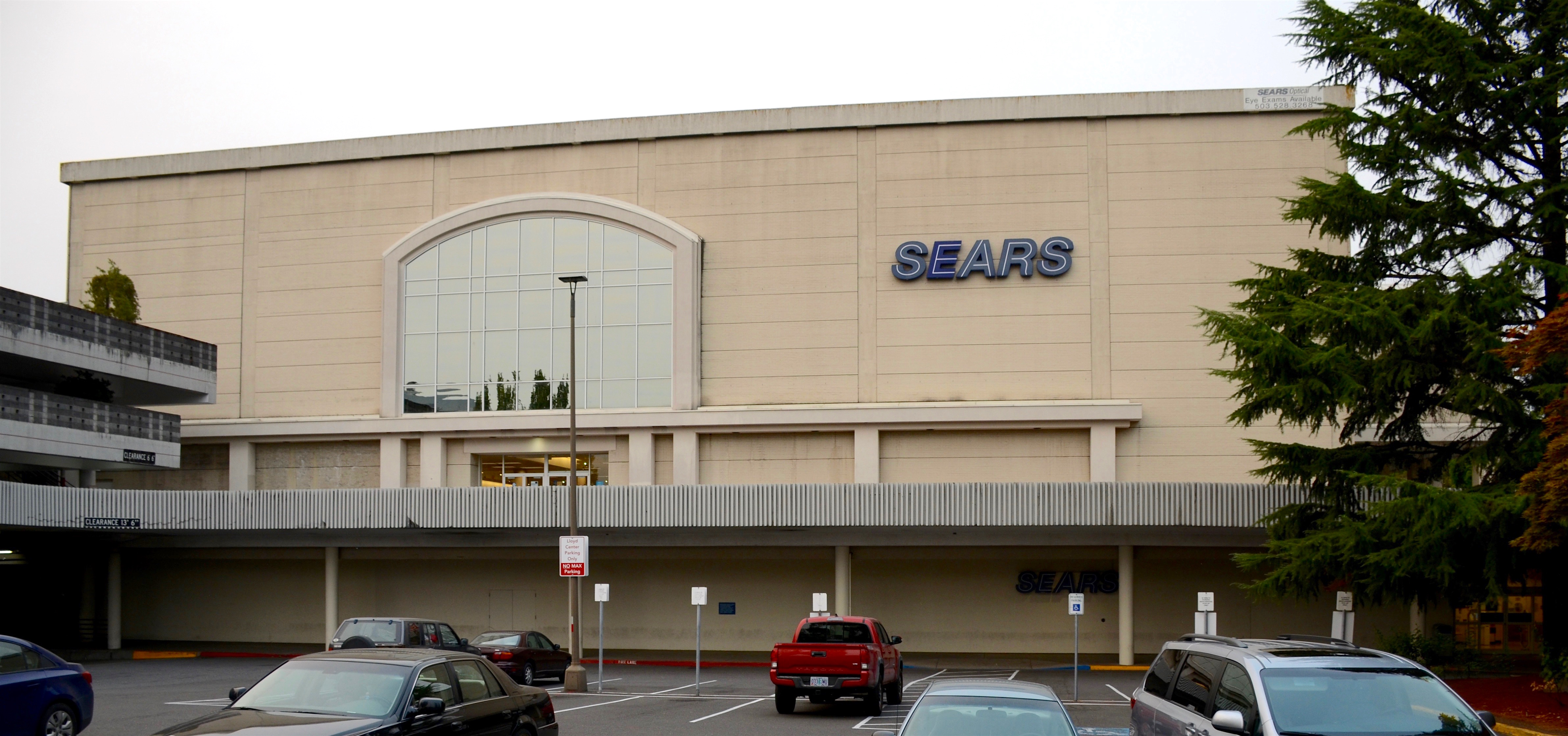
Sears – September 2017

In August 2016, Sears sold its 143,000-square-foot (13,300 m^{2}) space to the mall's owners, who were reported to be planning a major remodeling of its upper floors, demolishing the fourth floor and expanding the third floor. On January 4, 2018, Sears announced that its Lloyd Center store would be closing in early April 2018 as part of a plan to close 103 stores nationwide.

In 2018, the NAACP opened a new office in Lloyd Center. In January 2019, it was reported that Marshalls would be closing later that month. Then, after COVID hit, there were a flurry of announcements: On November 17, 2020, Macy's announced it would be closing in January 2021. Following the closure of Macy's, no traditional anchor stores remain in the mall. On January 12, 2021, Old Navy announced that the Lloyd Center store would permanently close by the end of January. That meant that the mall's first floor, which once housed Sears, Marshalls, and Payless Shoe Source would be entirely vacant. On August 6, 2021, a two-alarm fire started in the mall's basement, damaging the mall's electrical system. The mall was closed for over three weeks while repairs were made.

On November 1, 2021, local media reported that KKR Real Estate Finance Trust planned to foreclose on Lloyd Center by the end of the year because payments on its $110 million debt had not been made since October 2020. A comprehensive redevelopment of the site was also being considered.

=== Late 2021 – present: Redevelopment ===
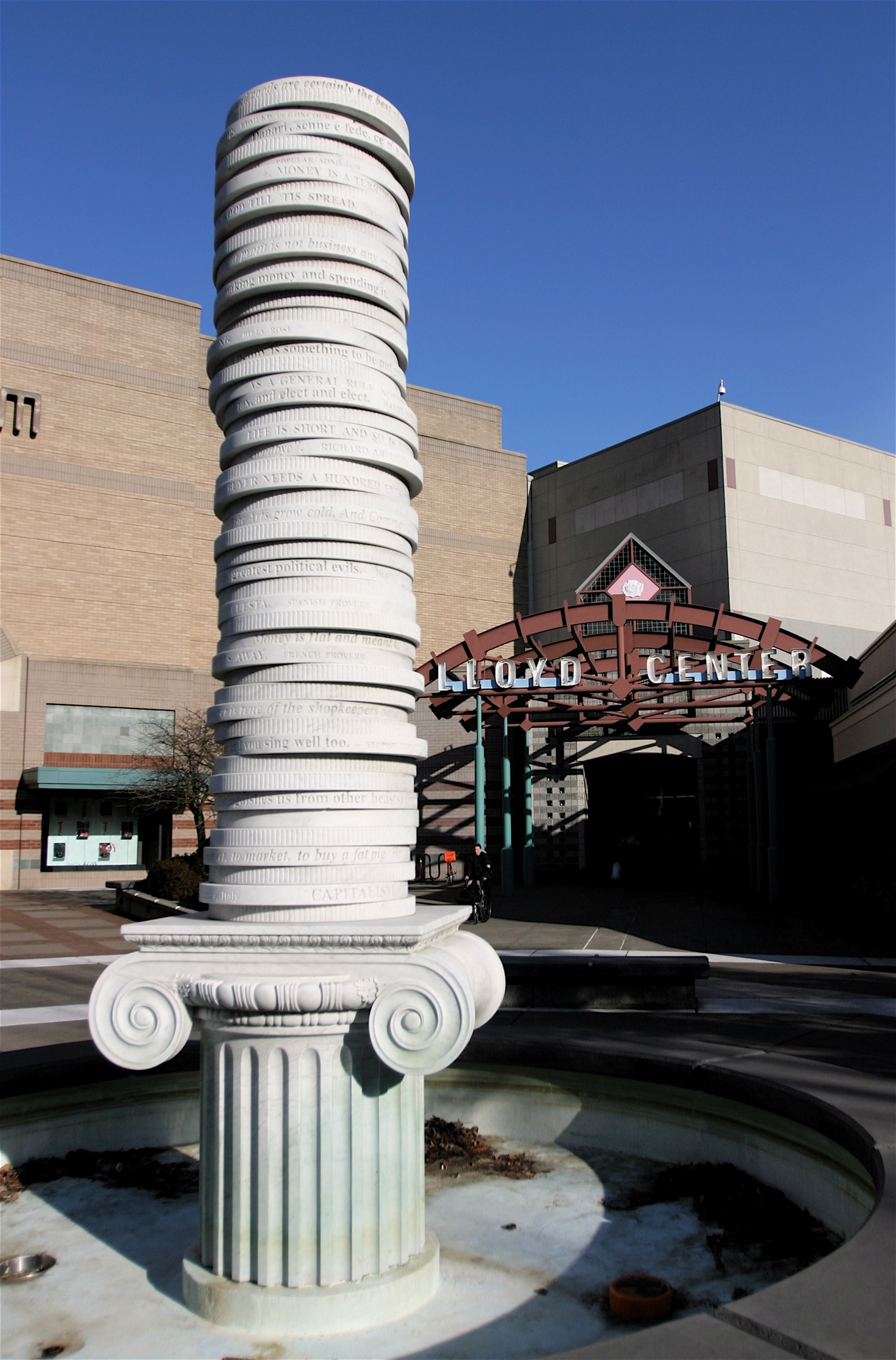
The sculpture Capitalism, at the southwest entrance

In a press release on December 20, 2021, Seattle-based real estate company Urban Renaissance Group announced themselves as the new owner-operators of Lloyd Center and expressed intentions to listen to "existing tenants, neighbors, the broader community and City officials."

The managing director of Urban Renaissance Group, Tom Kilbane, said that while store owners will not be seeing major changes to the mall for two years, they are unable to sign five-year leases due to uncertainty about future plans.

Several small, art-focused, independent local businesses relocated into the mall in 2022, citing lower rent and more opportunities. The arrival of a comic book store, Floating World Comics, the record shop Musique Plastique, art galleries, a photo studio, and performance spaces led to the mall being informally dubbed the "Lloyd Arts District." Rollerskating events were held in the abandoned Marshall's, a local theater company hosted productions in a defunct Victoria's Secret, and a defunct DMV was used as an art gallery. There was a performance art piece beside Capitalism, a dry fountain sculpture, and experimental jazz in the former stockroom of a Lady Foot Locker. Other independent businesses included a second-hand pet store, a vintage store, a coffee shop, a children's play space, and a tattoo parlor

In September 2023, Urban Renaissance Group announced plans to add 5,000 residential units to the mall while retaining the landmark ice rink. The proposal did not include a cost estimate or announce plans to close the mall.

In 2024, mall staples Ross Dress for Less and Cinnabon left the mall, but, Jumbo's Pickleball opened in the mall's former food court adjacent cinema and remained open after the center's closure due its exterior entrance. Only a handful of national retail brands were still open at the mall, including Forever 21, Claire’s, Hot Topic and Barnes & Noble.

That same year, Anschutz Entertainment Group announced plans, through AEG Presents and Monqui Presents, to develop a two-story, 68,000-square-foot live-music venue in the former Nordstrom building, with a capacity of up to 4,250 people. Demolition began in June 2025, and the venue is projected to open in early 2027 Live Nation had previously leased the space in 2018, but the proposed project was never realized.

Bob Slayton, owner of the Lloyd Center Orange Julius/DQ franchise, worked at the mall from shortly after its opening on and off until his death in 2025. A former ice-skating barrel jumper, he met his future wife at Lloyd Center. He was a former champion ice skating barrel jumper, who, at one time, managed the Lloyd ice rink. In 1983, Slayton converted the mall's Bob's Hol'n One donut concession into an Orange Julius. At one time, Slayton operated three Orange Julius locations, including stores at Clackamas Town Center and Vancouver Mall, which closed years ago. Following his death in 2025, his store at Lloyd Center, the last Orange Julius in Oregon, closed soon afterward.

In 2026, Urban Renaissance Group and KKR announced the mall, which was about 90% vacant, would be redeveloped into housing and retail. Along with ZGF Architects, they submitted a Master Plan to the city outlining plans to close and demolish the mall and divide the property into 14 parcels for sale and mixed-use redevelopment.

On February 4, 2026, the Design Commission held a hearing on the Lloyd Center Central City Master Plan. The hearing included hours of verbal testimony and 600 pages of written testimony, with the overwhelming majority opposing the plan. Many commenters specifically expressed support for preserving the ice rink, small businesses, and gathering space provided by the mall. The Design Commission approved the Master Plan on March 5, 2026.

In April 2, 2026, two appeals had been filed with the city in response to the Design Commission's decision. One was submitted by the Save Lloyd Ice Coalition, while the other was filed by the Save Lloyd Campaign in partnership with the Northeast Coalition of Neighborhoods.

The Barnes & Noble store at the mall closed in May 2026. In June, 2026, the mall hosted the Portland Rose Society’s 136th Spring Rose Show, its final show at Lloyd Center after 43 years. In July 2026, after two days of heated testimony, The Portland City Council unanimously rejected the appeals to the mall's master plan, officially clearing the way for the site's redevelopment.

==== Final month: Mall closure ====
Spectators observing the ice skating rink on the mall's final day in operation

A number of Lloyd Center tenants relocated to Pioneer Place downtown, including Floating World Comics, Auntie Anne's Pretzels, Brickdiculous, boutique Kathmandu to You, and All American Magic Shop. Gambit's Games & Anime moved to a new space in NE Portland. Portland Chess Club moved to Montgomery Park. Beau Monde Academy, the hairstyling school, moved to a space downtown.

Thousands of people showed up to celebrate the mall's final day on August 8, 2026, with a number of events scheduled, including a food court vendor fair, a community mural painting, as well as a naked bike ride.

Trackers Earth, Jumbo's Pickleball, and dermatologist Dr. Claudia Taylor remained open after the larger facility closure. Dr. Taylor's lease expires in April 2027, but through legal channels she was able to remain on site through that date.

== Ice rink ==
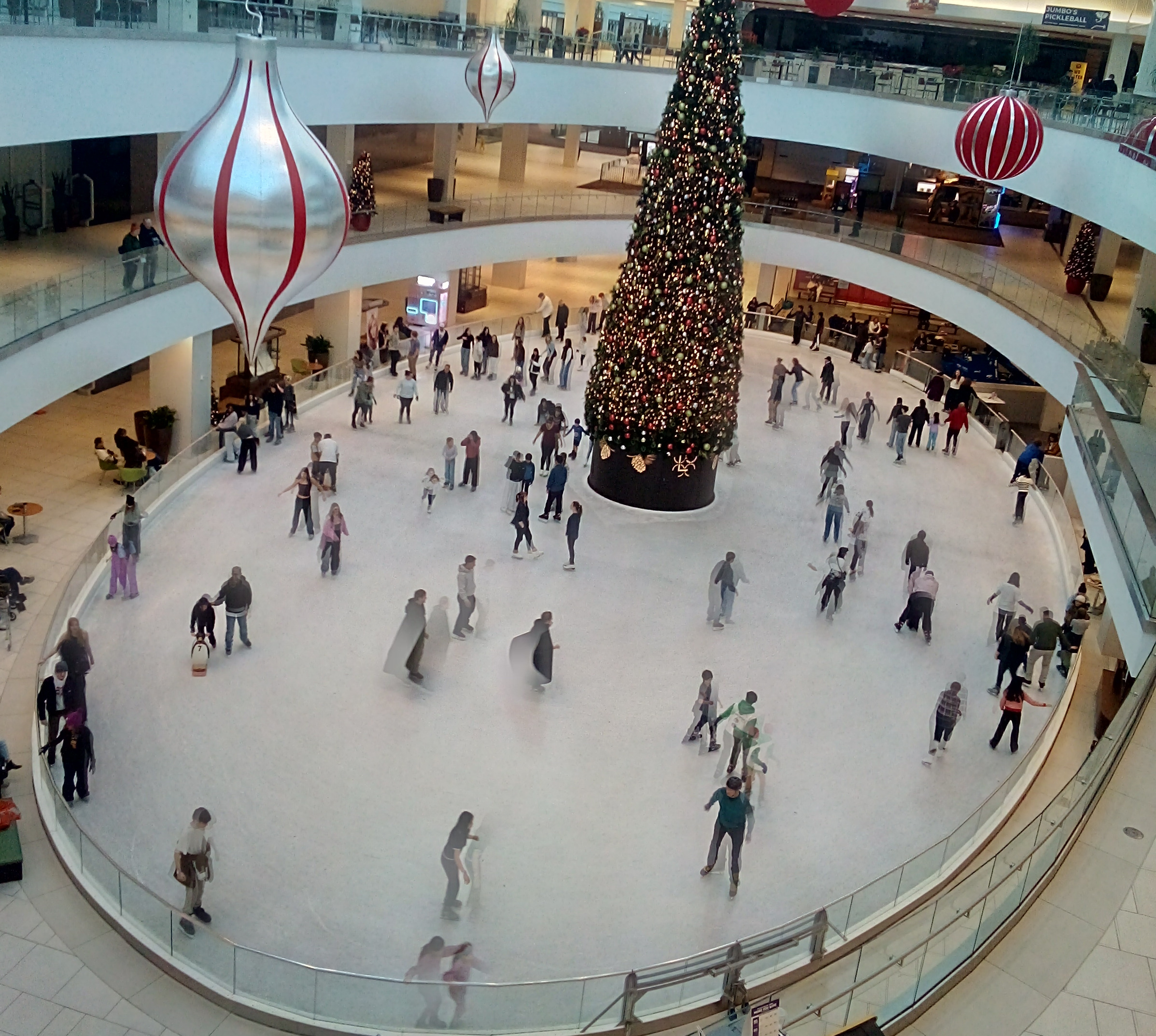
Lloyd Center Mall ice skate rink during Christmas 2025

Opening in 1960, the Lloyd Center ice rink was the world's first shopping center rink. The rink was the brainchild of Theresa Lloyd Von Hagen, the 17-year-old granddaughter of the mall's developer, and daughter of the mall's CEO, Richard Von Hagen. A competitive skater herself, she urged her family to make the rink the centerpiece of the mall project, modeling it after the rink at Rockefeller Center.

The open-air rink was widely popular, drawing more than a million visitors in its first two years, and remained the mall's central attraction. The ice rink attracted a few notable guests over the years. Actor Jim Backus, the voice of Mr. Magoo, once did a couple's routine with a bear. Robert F. Kennedy and his wife Ethel, circled Lloyd's ice rink in June 1968. Former Olympic figure skater Tonya Harding, at age 3, first learned to skate at the Lloyd Center rink, and met her coach Diane Rawlinson there.

The open-air ice rink was enclosed in the early 1990s as part of the mall's conversion from an open-air configuration to an enclosed shopping center with an atrium roof. The rink was reduced in size in 2016 from a standard rectangular rink design to a smaller oval shape. The redesign moved the rink to a more central location, and opened it up to be visible from all levels of the mall. The renovations to the food court were intended to make it easier to watch the skating below. Despite allowing for more natural light, the renovations were met with controversy by some locals, as the size was less than 4/5ths of its previous size, and some skaters took issue with the oval shape. To commemorate the skating rink's re-opening in 2016, former Olympic gold medal figure-skater Brian Boitano performed and then signed photos.

== In media ==
Comedian Jimmy Pardo performed the role of "Lloyd" in a series of TV commercials for Lloyd Center in the mid-90s. Gus Van Sant filmed parts of Paranoid Park (2007) at Lloyd Center. The rink was featured in The Shins "Kissing the Lipless" (2004) music video. Lloyd Center ice rink was recreated onscreen in I, Tonya (2017). In the mall's final years, several local independent films shot at the nearly empty mall and the Portland Film Festival held screenings there.

== Court case ==
Lloyd Center has played a role in the history of freedom of speech in the United States, especially with regard to the scope of free speech within private shopping centers. Lloyd Center was the defendant in the landmark cases of Lloyd Corp. v. Tanner, 407 U.S. 551 (1972), a decision of the U.S. Supreme Court involving First Amendment rights and private property, and Lloyd Corp. v. Whiffen, 307 Or. 674, 773 P.2d 1293 (1989), a decision of the Oregon Supreme Court.

The case involved a situation which occurred in 1968, when activists distributing anti-Vietnam War leaflets at Lloyd Center were threatened with trespassing arrests under the mall's ban on political leafleting. The activists subsequently filed a lawsuit claiming the policy violated their First Amendment rights.

Stressing that the center is "open to the general public" and "the functional equivalent of a public business district," and relying on Marsh v. Alabama, 326 U. S. 501, and Amalgamated Food Employees Union v. Logan Valley Plaza, 391 U. S. 308, The District Court held that petitioner's policy of prohibiting leafletting within the mall violated respondents' First Amendment rights.

Lloyd Corporation appealed, but the Ninth Circuit Court of Appeals upheld the decision. Lloyd Corporation then asked the U.S. Supreme Court to review the case. The Supreme Court agreed to hear the case and, in 1972, reversed the lower courts' decisions and sent the case back for further proceedings.

== See also ==
- Joe Brown's Carmel Corn
- List of shopping malls in Oregon
- List of shopping malls in the U.S.
- Stoopid Burger
