= Geneva's Shear Perfection =

Black barbershop in Portland, Oregon

- Interactive map of the Geneva's Shear Perfection area

General information
- Location: 5601 NE Martin Luther King Jr. Blvd., Portland, Oregon, United States
- Coordinates: 45°33′49″N 122°39′42″W

Geneva's Shear Perfection Barber & Beauty Salon was a barber shop and salon in northeast Portland, Oregon's King neighborhood, in the United States. The shop was located along Martin Luther King Jr. Boulevard and has been described as a "cornerstone" of the city's African-American community. Geneva's closed in 2020, during the COVID-19 pandemic.

== See also ==
- COVID-19 pandemic in Portland, Oregon
