= Central Library (Portland, Oregon) =

Library building in Portland, Oregon, U.S.

- Central Building, Public Library
- U.S. National Register of Historic Places
- Portland Historic Landmark
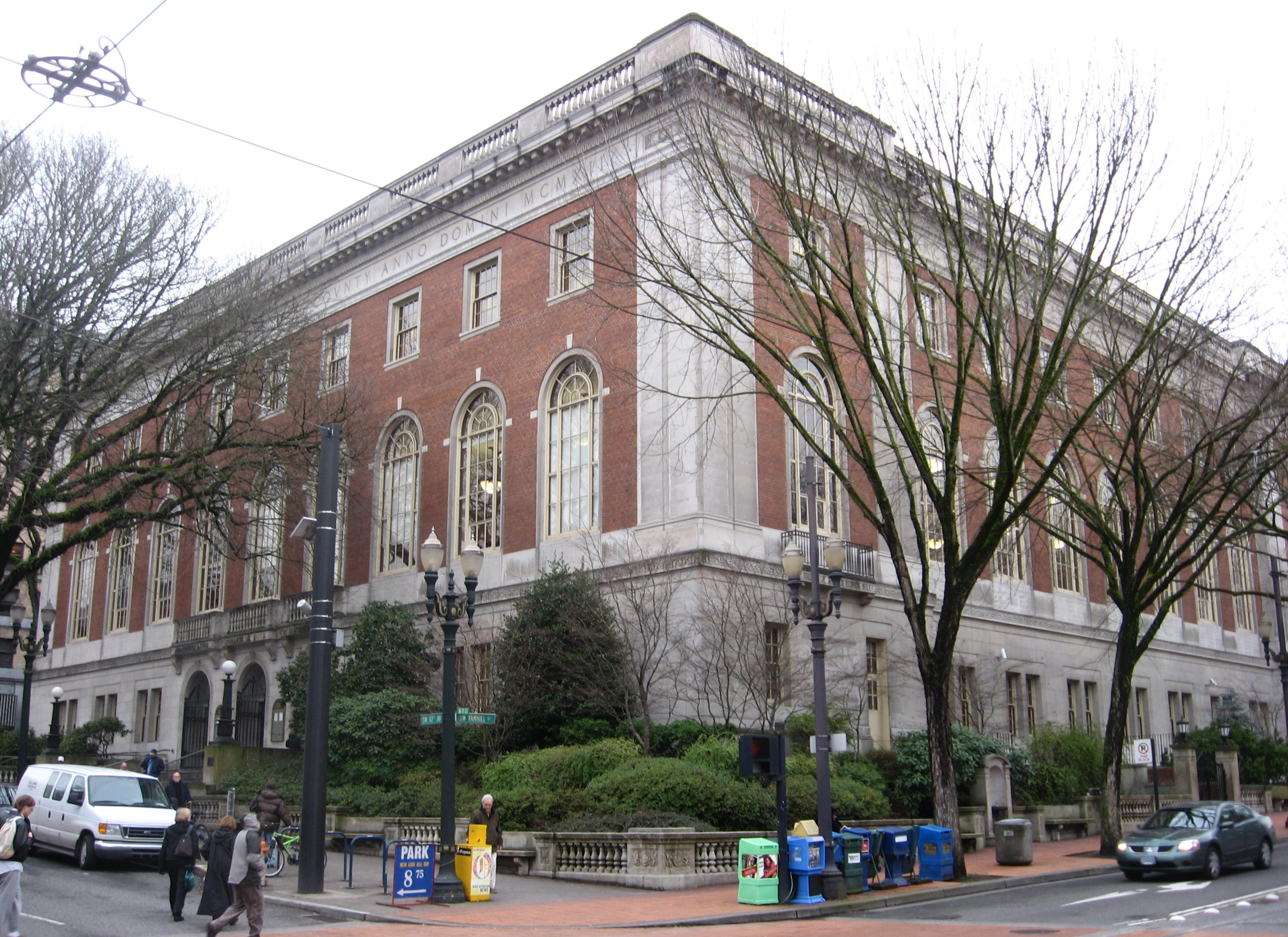

- Location within Portland, Oregon
- Location: 801 SW 10th Avenue; Portland, Oregon; 97205
- Coordinates: 45°31′09″N 122°41′00″W
- Area: 1 acre (0.40 ha)
- Built: 1913
- Architect: A. E. Doyle
- Architectural style: Georgian style
- NRHP reference No.: 79002129
- Added to NRHP: June 11, 1979

The Central Library is a three-story public library branch in the downtown core of Portland, Oregon, United States. Opened in 1913, it serves as the main branch of the Multnomah County Library system. In 1979, the Georgian style building was added to the National Register of Historic Places as the Central Building, Public Library. The library underwent major structural and interior renovations in the mid 1990s. The library also underwent a refresh in 2023.

== History ==
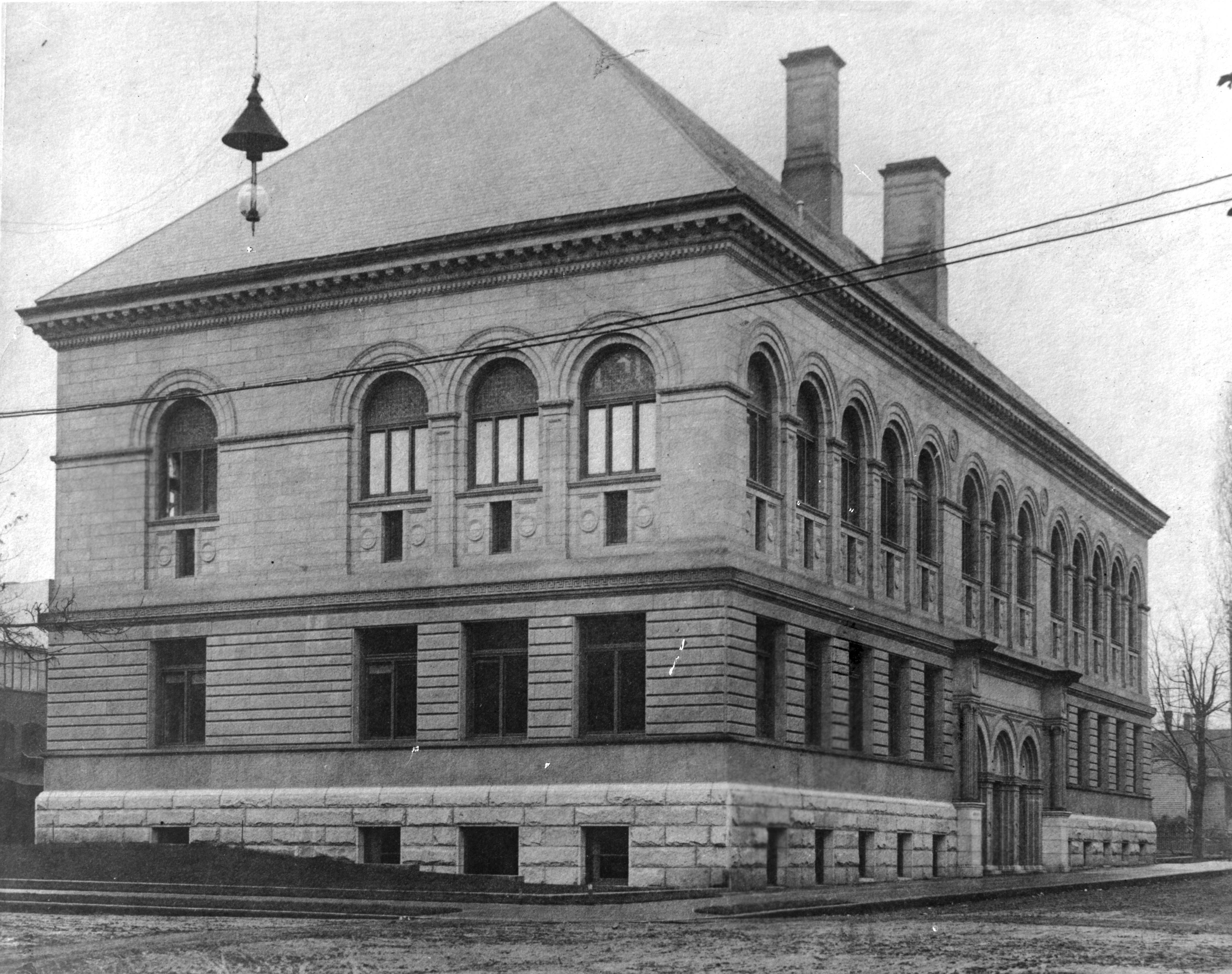
The Library Association of Portland's 1893 library, on Stark and Broadway. Designed by Chamberlain and Whidden.

The Library Association of Portland was formed in 1864. After going through several locations during the first half-century of existence, the library board decided on a new large main branch for downtown Portland in 1911. The building was designed by architect A. E. Doyle, and opened on September 6, 1913. It was one of the first libraries in the United States to feature an open plan design of the interior. Construction on the building lasted for two years and cost $480,000 to complete. Librarian Mary Frances Isom provided input on the design.

The Central Library was listed on the National Register of Historic Places as the Central Building, Public Library on June 11, 1979. On July 1, 1990, the private Library Association of Portland officially transferred ownership of the library to Multnomah County. From 1902 until that date, the association owned the collections and buildings, but the operations were paid for by the local governments. From 1994 to 1997, the Central Library underwent a major structural and interior renovation and seismic retrofitting. The entire roof of the building was removed and completely rebuilt, while the interior was extensively remodeled and restored. During the renovation, the library collection was moved to the nearby Fifth Avenue Building (the former State Office Building). Library patrons still had access to the collection during the reconstruction. The Central Library was closed in March 2023 to undergo an interior refresh, which maintained the core characteristics while providing more functional spaces. It was reopened in February 2024.

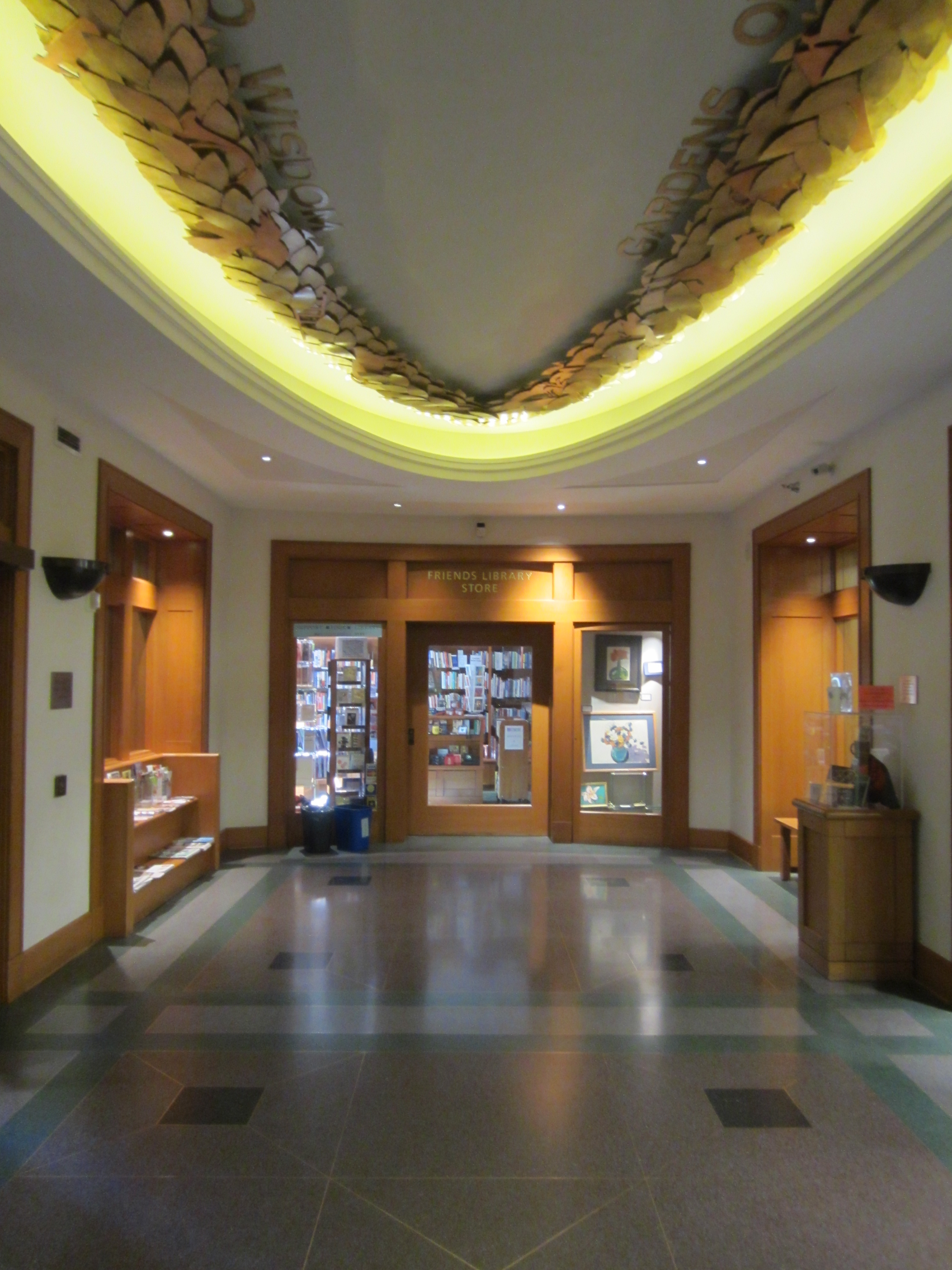
Garden Wreath sculpture in the lobby

== Details ==
Architecturally, the building was designed in the Georgian style. The main staircase at the library has a total of 92 steps. Artwork at the location includes the "Tree of Knowledge" by Dana Louis. The exterior walls are covered with Wilkinson Sandstone. Interior details include extensive use of marble and wood. The branch contains 125,000 square feet (11,600 m^{2}) of space spread over the five floors and two basements, three floors of which are open to the public.

The branch is home to the Beverly Cleary Children's Library and the Henry Failing Art and Music Library. Other features include the Sterling Room for Writers, the Collins Gallery on the third floor, and the John Wilson Room. The first floor houses two conference rooms available for public use. The library's collections weigh more than 875 tons and take up 17 miles (27 km) of shelf space. A total of 130 computer terminals are available to the public.
